= 1829 County Clare by-election =

UK parliamentary by-election

- 30 July 1829

Constituency of County Clare
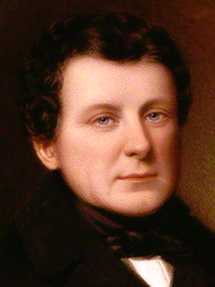
	First party
Candidate	Daniel O'Connell
Party	Radical
Popular vote	unopposed
MP before election
Daniel O'Connell
Radical
Elected MP
Daniel O'Connell
Radical

The 1829 County Clare by-election was notable as this was the first time following the Roman Catholic Relief Act 1829 that a Catholic MP, Daniel O'Connell was elected.

O'Connell had been elected in the 1828 County Clare by-election but as a Catholic he refused to take the Oath of Supremacy and his seat was vacated.

The Prime Minister, the Duke of Wellington, and the Home Secretary, Sir Robert Peel, who had previously opposed Catholic participation in Parliament, saw that denying O'Connell his seat would cause outrage and could lead to another rebellion or uprising in Ireland, which was about 85% Catholic. This led directly to the Roman Catholic Relief Act 1829 allowing Roman Catholics to become MPs.

Simultaneously, the Parliamentary Elections (Ireland) Act 1829 changed the 40 shilling franchise (£2) in Ireland to £10, and it was unclear whether O'Connell would be able to win again with many tenant farmers disenfranchised. This was not tested at the 1829 by-election as O'Connell was the only candidate and so was elected unopposed.

O'Connell did not stand again in Clare at the 1830 general election.
