= Parliamentary Boundaries Act 1832 =

Act of Parliament of the United Kingdom defining parliamentary constituencies

Parliamentary Boundaries Act 1832 (Note: The citation of this act by this short title was authorised by section 1 of, and the first schedule to, the Short Titles Act 1896. Due to the repeal of those provisions it is now authorised by section 19(2) of the Interpretation Act 1978.)
- Act of Parliament
- Parliament of the United Kingdom
- Long title: An Act to settle and describe the Divisions of Counties, and the Limits of Cities and Boroughs in England and Wales, in so far as respects the Election of Members to serve in Parliament.
- Citation: 2 & 3 Will. 4. c. 64
- Territorial extent: United Kingdom

Dates
- Royal assent: 11 July 1832
- Commencement: 11 July 1832 (Note: The Acts of Parliament (Commencement) Act 1793.)
- Repealed: 23 May 1950
Other legislation
Repealed by	Ballot Act 1872; Statute Law Revision Act 1874; Statute Law Revision (No. 2) Act 1888; Statute Law Revision Act 1890; Statute Law Revision Act 1950
Relates to	Representation of the People Act 1832; Representation of the People (Scotland) Act 1832; Representation of the People (Ireland) Act 1832; Parliamentary Boundaries (Ireland) Act 1832

Status: Repealed

Text of statute as originally enacted

The Parliamentary Boundaries Act 1832 (2 & 3 Will. 4. c. 64) was an act of the Parliament of the United Kingdom which defined the parliamentary divisions (constituencies) in England and Wales required by the Reform Act 1832. The boundaries were largely those recommended by a boundary commission headed by the surveyor Thomas Drummond.

== Provisions ==
Sections 1 to 25 of the act defined the divisions of those larger counties of England which under the Reform Act 1832 (2 & 3 Will. 4. c. 45) were to be divided into two divisions. This did not include the seven counties which were to return three members each.

Sections 26 and 27 and schedule M dealt with detached parts of counties. It provided that most detached parts (identified in schedule M) were to form part of the parliamentary county and division in which they were geographically located, rather than of the county to which they otherwise formed a part. Section 28 provided that liberties and other places with a separate jurisdiction (but not the counties corporate of Bristol, Exeter, Lichfield, Norwich, or Nottingham) were to be included in the county and division in which they were geographically located.

Sections 29 to 34 prescribed polling districts and polling places within each constituency.

Sections 35 to 37 and schedule O defined the boundaries of each parliamentary borough. In ancient boroughs these replaced boundaries established by charter or prescription, often centuries out of date. The commissioners favoured rational boundaries, encompassing an urban centre with some suburban room for growth. However, some of the smaller boroughs to escape disfranchisement were given large rural tracts to increase the represented population.

== Subsequent developments ==
The whole act, so far as unrepealed, was repealed by section 1(1) of, and the first schedule to, the Statute Law Revision Act 1950 (14 Geo. 6. c. 6), which came into force on 23 May 1950.

== See also ==
- List of constituencies enfranchised and disfranchised by the Reform Act 1832

== Bibliography ==
- Salmon, Philip (2009). "Surveys: IX. The English Reform Legislation". In Fisher, D.R. (ed.). The House of Commons 1820–1832. The History of Parliament. Cambridge University Press – via History of Parliament Online.
- Spychal, Martin (August 2017). "'One of the best men of business we had ever met': Thomas Drummond, the boundary commission and the 1832 Reform Act". Historical Research. 90 (249): 543–566. doi:10.1111/1468-2281.12180.
