= Scottish Reform Act 1832 =

United Kingdom law reforming the electoral system in Scotland

Representation of the People (Scotland) Act 1832 (Note: The citation of this act by this short title was authorised by section 1 of, and the first schedule to, the Short Titles Act 1896. Due to the repeal of those provisions it is now authorised by section 19(2) of the Interpretation Act 1978.)
- Act of Parliament
- Parliament of the United Kingdom
- Long title: An Act to amend the Representation of the People in Scotland.
- Citation: 2 & 3 Will. 4. c. 65
- Introduced by: John Russell, 1st Earl Russell (Commons)
- Territorial extent: Scotland (Note: Section 1.)

Dates
- Royal assent: 17 July 1832
- Commencement: 16 August 1832 (Note: Section 1. The end of the next parliament.)
- Repealed: 21 May 1981
Other legislation
Amended by	Representation of the People (Scotland) Act 1835; Corrupt Practices Prevention Act 1854; Statute Law Revision Act 1890; Representation of the People Act 1918; Representation of the People Act 1948; Representation of the People Act 1949; Statute Law Revision Act 1950
Repealed by	Statute Law (Repeals) Act 1981
Relates to	Representation of the People Act 1832; Parliamentary Boundaries Act 1832; Representation of the People (Ireland) Act 1832; Parliamentary Boundaries (Ireland) Act 1832; Parliamentary Burghs (Scotland) Act 1833

Status: Repealed

Text of statute as originally enacted

The Scottish Reform Act 1832 (2 & 3 Will. 4. c. 65) was an act of the Parliament of the United Kingdom that introduced wide-ranging changes to the election laws of Scotland. The act was passed at approximately the same time as the Reform Act 1832 (2 & 3 Will. 4. c. 45) which applied to England and Wales, and the Irish Reform Act 1832 (2 & 3 Will. 4. c. 88). The chief architects of the act were Francis Jeffrey and Henry Cockburn. It was subsequently given the official short title of the Representation of the People (Scotland) Act 1832. Prior to the act, Scotland's electorate was only 0.2% of the population compared to 4% in England. The Scottish electorate overnight soared from 5,000 to 65,000, or 13% of the adult men, and was no longer a private preserve for a few very rich families.

The act did not substantially change the method in which the Scottish counties elected members of Parliament. As a general rule the counties each continued to elect one member. However, before the act six small counties elected an MP only in alternate Parliaments. This arrangement was ended, but a different solution was adopted for each pair of counties. Clackmannanshire and Kinross-shire became a single constituency. Buteshire and Caithness-shire were given a separate MP in every Parliament. Cromartyshire and Nairnshire were each united with a different neighbouring county, to form Ross and Cromarty, and Elginshire and Nairnshire.

Edinburgh and Glasgow now had two MPs; Aberdeen, Dundee, Greenock, Paisley and Perth one each. The remaining burghs combined in districts to elect 18 MPs, much as before; but now individual votes were added up among burghs across the constituency—in the past the MP had been elected at a meeting of representatives from each burgh. Boundary changes meant that a burgh for parliamentary elections might not have the same boundaries as the burgh for other purposes.

The effect of the Reform Act was considerable. Before 1832 the Scottish parliamentary electorate had been about 5,000 adult males. Following the passing of the act, the number of Scottish MPs increased from 45 to 53 and the franchise increased by an even greater proportion, growing from under 5,000 of the 2,300,000 population to 65,000 voters (now covering householders of £10 value in the burghs and property owners of £10 or tenants of £50 rental in the country seats). However the ballot was not secret and landowners could manipulate the property qualification by distributing nominal £10 parcels to multiple nominees who would follow the landowner's voting instructions.

== Subsequent developments ==
Section 30 of the act, so far as unrepealed, was repealed by section 1(1) of, and the first schedule to, the Statute Law Revision Act 1950 (14 Geo. 6. c. 6), which came into force on 23 May 1950.

The whole act was repealed by section 1(1) of, and part IV of schedule 1 to, the Statute Law (Repeals) Act 1981, which came into force on 21 May 1981.

== See also ==
- 1832 in Scotland
- Reform Acts
- Representation of the People Act
