= Forty-shilling freeholders =

United Kingdom legislation

Forty-shilling freeholders were those who had the parliamentary franchise to vote by virtue of possessing freehold property, or lands held directly of the king, of an annual rent of at least forty shillings (i.e. £2 or 3 marks), clear of all charges.

The qualification to vote using the ownership and value of property, and the creation of a group of forty-shilling freeholders, was practiced in many jurisdictions such as England, Scotland, Ireland, the United States of America, Australia, and Canada.

== History ==
During the Second Barons' War, Simon de Montfort, 6th Earl of Leicester instigated the English parliament of 1265, without royal approval. De Montfort's army had met and defeated the royal forces at the Battle of Lewes on 14 May 1264. Montfort sent out representatives to each county and to a select list of boroughs, asking each to send two representatives, and insisted the representatives be elected. Henry III rejected the new Parliament and resumed his war against Montfort, who was killed later that year at the Battle of Evesham, but the idea of electing knights of the shire as representatives of the counties, and burgesses from the boroughs, became a permanent feature.

The Forty Shilling Freeholder Act 1430 limited the franchise to only those who owned the freehold of land that brought in an annual rent of at least forty shillings (forty-shilling freeholders). For comparison: In the mid 1340s, a knight received a daily pay of two shillings while on campaign, an ordinary man-at-arms the half of it, a foot archer was paid two or three pence (12 pennies = 1 shilling and 20 shillings = 1 pound). A war-horse could value from five to 100 pounds.

The legislation did not specify the gender of the property owner, however the franchise became restricted to males by custom. In subsequent centuries, until the Great Reform Act 1832 specified 'male persons', a few women were able to vote in parliamentary elections through property ownership, although this was rare.

== England and Wales ==
Until legislation in the fifteenth century the franchise for elections of knights of the shire to serve as the representatives of counties in the Parliament of England was not restricted to forty-shilling freeholders.

The Yale historian Charles Seymour, discussing the original county franchise, suggested that "it is probable that all free inhabitant householders voted and that the parliamentary qualification was, like that which compelled attendance in the county court, merely a 'resiance' or residence qualification". Seymour explains why Parliament decided to limit the county franchise:

The Act of 1430, after declaring that elections had been crowded by many persons of low estate, and that confusion had thereby resulted, accordingly enacted that the suffrage should be limited to persons qualified by a freehold of 40s.

Electors of Knights of the Shires Act 1429
- Act of Parliament
- Parliament of England
- Long title: What Sort of Men shall be Choosers, and who shall be chosen Knights of the Parliament.
- Citation: 8 Hen. 6 c. 7
- Territorial extent: England and Wales; Ireland

Dates
- Royal assent: 23 February 1430
- Commencement: 22 September 1429 (Note: Start of session.)
- Repealed: 6 February 1918

Other legislation
- Amended by: Electors of Knights of the Shire Act 1432
- Repealed by: Parliamentary Elections (No. 2) Act 1774; Ballot Act 1872; Statute Law Revision (Ireland) Act 1872; Representation of the People Act 1918
- Relates to: Parliamentary Elections Act 1444

Status: Repealed

Text of statute as originally enacted

Electors of Knights of the Shire Act 1432
- Act of Parliament
- Parliament of England
- Long title: Certain things required in him who shall be a chooser of the knights of the parliament.
- Citation: 10 Hen. 6 c. 2
- Territorial extent: England and Wales; Ireland

Dates
- Royal assent: 17 July 1432
- Commencement: 12 May 1432 (Note: Start of session.)
- Repealed: 6 February 1918

Other legislation
- Amends: Electors of Knights of the Shire Act 1429
- Repealed by: Parliamentary Elections (No. 2) Act 1774; Statute Law Revision (Ireland) Act 1872; Representation of the People Act 1918
- Relates to: Parliamentary Elections Act 1444

Status: Repealed

Text of statute as originally enacted

The Parliament of England legislated the new uniform county franchise, in the Electors of Knights of the Shires Act 1429 (8 Hen. 6 c. 7). The Electors of Knights of the Shire Act 1432 (10 Hen. 6 c. 2), which amended and re-enacted the 1430 law to make clear that the resident of a county had to have a forty-shilling freehold in that county to be a voter there.

Over the course of time many types of property were accepted as being forty-shilling freeholds and the residence requirement disappeared.

According to Seymour:

this qualification was broader in practice than would appear at first glance, since the term freehold was applicable to many kinds of property. An explanatory act of parliament, it is true, confined it to lands of purely freehold tenure; but notwithstanding this purely formal declaration, the wider interpretation of the meaning of freeholder persisted, and we read of many freehold voters who were enfranchised by such qualifications as annuities and rent charges issuing out of freehold lands, and even dowers of wives and pews in churches. After the Restoration the electoral rights of clergymen were recognised by statute and church offices were held to confer a county franchise; this interpretation widened commensurately with the financial possibilities and value of a vote. A chorister of Ely Cathedral, the butler and brewer of Westminster Abbey, the bell-ringer, the gardener, the cook and the organ-blower, all voted by virtue of their supposedly ecclesiastical offices. In 1835 the members of a vestry in Marylebone succeeded in qualifying as electors from a burial ground attached to the parish ...

Because of the above interpretations and as the qualifying figure was not uplifted or based on backdated valuations (to take account of inflation as in Scotland, where to be a shire elector required ownership of land worth forty shillings of old extent) the number of qualified voters gradually expanded. Tempering this extension to the franchise were laws proposed by objectors (such as King William IV in 1832) who deemed the non-landowning office holders and smallest landowners/investors as a dangerously large franchise.

Taxpaying qualifications in connection with the freehold franchise were first required in 1712. In that year the exercise of the franchise became contingent upon the assessment [emphasis added] of the land or tenements, in respect of which the vote was conferred, (10 Anne, c. 31). (Note: Elections (Fraudulent Conveyances) Act 1711 (10 Ann. c. 31)) In 1781 the right to vote in counties was made dependent upon a charge, laid within six months of the election, "toward some aid granted or to be granted to His Majesty by a land-tax or an assessment, in the name of the person claiming to vote" (20 George III, c. 17)... (Note: Parliamentary Elections Act 1780 (20 Geo. 3 c. 17))

When the question of voting rights came up in 1832, general sentiment in the House of Commons favoured retaining the qualification in counties, notwithstanding the well known desire of the King who regarded this franchise as too democratic and would have liked to see it raised to £10 value, if it were not to be entirely [replaced]. Royal wishes did not however coincide with the interests of either party. The electoral strength of the Whigs in many county constituencies depended upon the freeholder vote of large urban communities, whereas the Tories, on the other hand, looked to the support of the small freeholder in the country districts. Neither party favoured the abolition or the increase in value of the freeholder qualification; instead the Commons voted [for] a continuation of the 40 s. franchise and agreed to impose limitations upon it: freehold estates lesser than [inherited] estates were to confer the vote only under certain conditions; and when the estate was for life (or lives) only, there must be actual and bona fide occupation for it serve as a qualification. The wider interpretation of the meaning of freehold, which admitted as qualifications such holdings as pew rights, annuities and church offices, was not restricted by the Act of 1832. (Note: Reform Act 1832)

— Seymour (1915)

A disputed point, on which the Whig majority in the Commons prevailed, was that freeholders in boroughs who did not occupy their property should vote in the counties in which the borough was situated. The Tories objected that urban interests would affect the representation of agricultural areas. The Whigs pointed out this had always been the case with urban areas not previously represented as borough constituencies (which had included major centres of wealth and population like Birmingham, Leeds and Manchester as well as the rapidly growing suburbs of London). This provision proved to be damaging to the Liberal cause later in the century.

It was found that about 70% of the county constituency electorate after passage of the Reform Act 1832 (2 & 3 Will. 4 c. 45) still qualified to vote.

From 1885 the property-owning franchise became less important than the occupancy one. Only about 20% of the county electorate were freeholders in 1886 and the proportion declined to about 16% in 1902.

In 1918, with the introduction of a full adult male franchise, property qualifications only affected some of the new women voters (who were not occupiers of a dwelling or the wife of an occupier, in the constituency) and plural voting business property owners. They needed respectively a £5 and £10 qualification – the forty shilling qualification ended. Universal adult suffrage was enacted in 1928 and the remaining plural votes were abolished by the Representation of the People Act 1948 so that by and since the 1950 United Kingdom general election no voters have qualified on the basis of the ownership of land.

== Ireland ==
Similarly in Ireland before 1829 the franchise for county constituencies was restricted to forty-shilling freeholders. This gave anyone who owned or rented land that was worth forty shillings (two pounds) or more, the right to vote. As a consequence they were termed the "forty-shilling freeholders". This included many Catholics who obtained the vote under the Roman Catholic Relief Act 1793 for the Irish House of Commons (from 1801 for the United Kingdom House of Commons).

The Parliamentary Elections (Ireland) Act 1829, enacted on the same day as the Roman Catholic Relief Act 1829, raised the franchise qualification to the English threshold level of ten pounds. This eliminated the middling tenantry who had risked much in defying their landlords on Daniel O'Connell's behalf in the 1828 County Clare by-election that helped finally force the issue of Catholic access to Parliament, and it reduced the overall electorate in the country from 216,000 voters to just 37,000.

O'Connell's erstwhile ally in Ulster, George Ensor predicted as the price for allowing "a few Catholic gentlemen to be returned to Parliament", the sacrifice of the forty-shilling freeholder and "indifference" it demonstrated to the cause of parliamentary reform would prove "disastrous" for the country. In Ensor's home county Armagh, "Emancipation" reduced an electorate of over 8,000 by three quarters so that even after the Reform Act 1832 and the Representation of the People (Ireland) Act 1832, it stood at just 3,487.

The forty-shilling qualification continued after 1829 in the comparatively small number of Irish boroughs which had the status of a corporate county. But the ten-pound threshold remained the basis of the county franchise in Ireland until the Representation of the People Act 1884 which extended the same voting qualifications as existed in the towns to the countryside.

== See also ==
- Parliamentary franchise in the United Kingdom 1885–1918 including a summary of the qualifications for the forty-shilling freehold franchise during the final years of its existence.
- Montfort's Parliament
- Knights of the shire
- Henry III of England
- Simon de Montfort, 6th Earl of Leicester
- Weighted voting

== Bibliography ==
- Chronological Table of the Statutes: Part 1 1235-1962 (The Stationery Office Ltd 1999)
- The Constitutional Year Book 1900 (William Blackstone & Sons 1900)
- Representation of the People Act 1918 (printed by authority in the Statutes for 1918)
- The Statutes: Revised Edition, Vol. I Henry III to James II (printed by authority in 1876)
- The Statutes: Second Revised Edition, Vol. XVI 1884-1886 (printed by authority in 1900)
