= Parliamentary Elections (Ireland) Act 1829 =

UK law restricting the franchise in Irish constituencies

- Act of Parliament
- Parliament of the United Kingdom
- Long title: An Act to amend certain Acts of the Parliament of Ireland relative to the Election of Members to serve in Parliament, and to regulate the Qualification of Persons entitled to vote at the Election of Knights of the Shire in Ireland.
- Citation: 10 Geo. 4. c. 8
- Territorial extent: United Kingdom

Dates
- Royal assent: 13 April 1829
- Commencement: 14 April 1829 (Note: Section 42.)
- Repealed: 5 August 1873
Other legislation
Amends	Parliament Adjournment and Elections Act 1542
Repealed by	Statute Law Revision Act 1873
Relates to	Roman Catholic Relief Act 1829; Representation of the People (Ireland) Act 1832; Parliamentary Boundaries (Ireland) Act 1832

Status: Repealed

Text of statute as originally enacted

The Parliamentary Elections (Ireland) Act 1829 (10 Geo. 4. c. 8), also known as the Irish Franchise Act 1829, was an act of the Parliament of the United Kingdom. It restricted the franchise to elect knights of the shire (Members of Parliament in county constituencies) in Ireland by raising the property threshold fivefold, from the British standard ownership or rent of a forty-shilling freehold to a ten-pound freehold.

== Provisions ==
The act stipulated that:

... no Person shall be admitted to vote at any Election of any Knight of the Shire to serve in the Parliament of the United Kingdom for any County in Ireland (save as hereinafter is provided), unless such Person shall have an Estate of Freehold, in Lands, Tenements, or Hereditaments in such County, of the clear Yearly Value of Ten Pounds at the least ...

The provision was a quid pro quo to secure passage of the Roman Catholic Relief Act 1829 (10 Geo. 4. c. 7), which permitted Catholics to sit in Parliament. Both acts received royal assent on the same day.

== Subsequent developments ==
The impact of the fivefold increase in the property threshold has been estimated as a drop in the Irish electorate from 216,000 to 37,000.

In 1832, a combination of the Representation of the People (Ireland) Act 1832 (2 & 3 Will. 4. c. 88), and Parliamentary Boundaries (Ireland) Act 1832 (c. 89) raised it to 60,500, still less than a third of its pre-emancipation level.

The whole act was repealed by section 1 of, and the schedule to, the Statute Law Revision Act 1873 (36 & 37 Vict. c. 91), which came into force on 5 August 1873.
