= Representation of the People (Ireland) Act 1832 =

Act of the Parliament of the United Kingdom reforming the Irish electoral system

Representation of the People (Ireland) Act 1832 (Note: The citation of this act by this short title was authorised by section 1 of, and the first schedule to, the Short Titles Act 1896. Due to the repeal of those provisions it is now authorised by section 19(2) of the Interpretation Act 1978.)
- Act of Parliament
- Parliament of the United Kingdom
- Long title: An Act to amend the representation of the people in Ireland.
- Citation: 2 & 3 Will. 4. c. 88
- Territorial extent: United Kingdom

Dates
- Royal assent: 7 August 1832
- Commencement: 7 August 1832 (Note: The Acts of Parliament (Commencement) Act 1793.)
- Repealed: United Kingdom: 18 December 1953; Republic of Ireland: 9 December 1963
Other legislation
Amended by	Statute Law Revision Act 1874; Corrupt Practices Prevention Act 1854; Statute Law Revision Act 1875; Statute Law Revision Act 1890
Repealed by	United Kingdom: Statute Law Revision (No. 2) Act 1888, Representation of the People Act 1918 and Statute Law Revision Act 1953; Republic of Ireland: Electoral Act 1963
Relates to	Parliamentary Elections (Ireland) Act 1829; Parliamentary Boundaries (Ireland) Act 1832; Reform Act 1832; Scottish Reform Act 1832

Status: Repealed

Text of statute as originally enacted

The Representation of the People (Ireland) Act 1832 (2 & 3 Will. 4. c. 88), commonly called the Irish Reform Act 1832, was an act of the Parliament of the United Kingdom that introduced wide-ranging changes to the election laws of Ireland. The act was passed two months after the Reform Act 1832, which applied to England and Wales.

From 1 January 1801, Ireland was represented in the House of Commons by 100 members. Each of the thirty-two counties returned two MPs as did the Boroughs of Dublin City, County Dublin and Cork City, County Cork. Thirty-one other Boroughs and Dublin University sent one MP to Westminster.

The 1832 act increased the total number of seats in Ireland to 105, with a second seat to the boroughs of Belfast, County Antrim; Galway Borough, County Galway; Limerick City, County Limerick and Waterford, County Waterford, as well as Dublin University.

From 1801 to 1829, the possession of freehold land worth at least 40 shillings (£2) conferred a county vote, as in England and Wales in this period. Catholics, who had been permitted to qualify as Irish voters only since 1793, were excluded from serving in Parliament until 1829. On the same day that the Roman Catholic Relief Act 1829 was enacted, allowing Catholics to sit in Parliament, a more restrictive county franchise was introduced under the Parliamentary Elections (Ireland) Act 1829, requiring possession of freehold land worth at least £10 (a fivefold increase from the previous 40 shillings), as the qualification for a county vote.

The 1832 legislation left the Irish county electorate much the same, but some new qualifications added to the electorate. From 1832 the qualifications were £10 freeholders, leaseholders for lives and copyholders of estates of £10, leaseholders for at least 60 years and the assignees of the same or leaseholders for at least 14 years of £20 estates.

Before 1832 each borough constituency had its own qualification for voting. In some, only the members of the corporation (the Borough Council) had the vote. In others, a wider group of freemen and 40 shilling freeholders could vote.

The number of borough voters before the Reform Acts varied considerably. A by-election took place in Bandon, County Cork. On 22 July 1831, the by-election was decided by only 11 voters (divided five, four and two across three candidates). A by-election was held for the two seats of Dublin City, County Dublin, on 18 August 1832. It involved 4,550 votes (each voter could cast one or two votes as they pleased). This last vote was the final pre-reformed parliamentary election in Ireland.

In 1832 the Irish boroughs were given a more uniform franchise. In addition to those who qualified under the previous rules, all occupiers of property worth at least £10 and resident freemen by birth or servitude became electors. The freemen were members of trade guilds, either because they had inherited membership or because they had served an apprenticeship to become members.

The franchise for the university had been held by the provost, fellows and scholars of Trinity College Dublin. From 1832, all Trinity College graduates holding a Master of Arts could vote.

The introduction of electoral registration in Ireland in 1832 confirms that there continued to be considerable differences in electorates after the Reform legislation. Together with the Parliamentary Boundaries (Ireland) Act 1832, enacted on the same day, the result was a modest increased the Irish electorate to around 60,500. This left only one person enfranchised in every 115 in Ireland, compared to one in every 24 in England.

At the same time, constituency electorates remained markedly uneven; for example:

County constituencies (two seats each):

- County Sligo 695;
- County Cork 3,835

Borough constituencies:

- Lisburn, County Antrim 91 (1 seat);
- Dublin City, County Dublin 7,008 (2 seats)

The whole act, so far as unrepealed, was repealed by section 1 of, and the first schedule to, the Statute Law Revision Act 1953 (2 & 3 Eliz. 2. c. 5), which came into force on 18 December 1953.

The whole act was repealed for the Republic of Ireland by section 3 of, and the first schedule to, the Electoral Act 1963, which came into force on 9 December 1963.

== See also ==
- List of acts of the Parliament of the United Kingdom

== Bibliography ==
- Lewis, Samuel (1837). "Appendix: Shewing the Boundaries of the Cities and Boroughs in Ireland, as adopted and defined by the Act passed in the 2nd and 3rd of William IV., cap. 89, intituled An Act to settle and describe the Limits of Cities, Towns, and Boroughs in Ireland, in so far as respects the Election of Members to serve in Parliament.". A Topographical Dictionary of Ireland.
