= 1828 County Clare by-election =

First Catholic elected as MP since the Reformation

- 5 July 1828

Constituency of County Clare
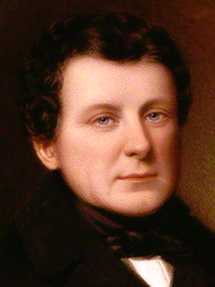

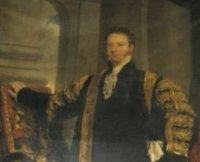
	First party	Second party
Candidate	Daniel O'Connell	William Vesey-FitzGerald
Party	Radical	Tory
Popular vote	2,057	982
Percentage	67.69%	32.31%
MP before election
William Vesey-FitzGerald
Tory
Elected MP
Daniel O'Connell
Radical

The 1828 County Clare by-election was notable as this was the first time since the reformation that an openly Catholic MP, Daniel O'Connell was elected.

The Roman Catholic Relief Act 1793 had extended the franchise to Catholics in Ireland. However, under the Oath of Supremacy required of MPs to take their seats, Catholics were not permitted to sit in the House of Commons of the United Kingdom. This requirement was confirmed under the Acts of Union.

Clare was held by William Vesey Fitzgerald when he was appointed as President of the Board of Trade. As this was seen to be an office of profit, Vesey-FitzGerald had to stand in a by-election. It was not unusual for such ministerial by-elections to be uncontested. However, the Catholic Association, a campaigning group had vowed to oppose every member of the current government, which had declined to allow for Catholic emancipation. Vesey-FitzGerald was reasonably popular with Catholics in Clare, and a number of candidates were approached but refused to stand.

Although Catholics were disqualified from sitting in the House of Commons, there was no law preventing them from running for election. Daniel O'Connell decided to stand, although he would not be permitted to take his seat if elected.

Like all parliamentary elections prior to the Ballot Act 1872, Clare was held as an open vote, which meant that all votes would be known. This meant that Protestant and pro-union landowners could influence their tenants, who were far more likely to be Catholic and anti-union.

== Result ==
O'Connell won the by-election, but could not take the Oath of Supremacy, which was incompatible with Catholicism and so could not take his seat in parliament. This meant that his demand rose to allow him to become an MP for County Clare as it did not have representation. O'Connell hinted that he would get more Catholics elected to force the situation saying "they must crush us or conciliate us".

By-election 5 July 1828: County Clare
Party	Candidate	Votes	%	±%
Radical	Daniel O'Connell	2,057	67.69	
Tory	William Vesey Fitzgerald	982	32.31	
Majority		1,075	35.38	N/A
Turnout		3,039		
Radical gain from Tory		Swing		

== Consequences ==
After O'Connell refused to take the Oath, his seat was vacated.

The Prime Minister, the Duke of Wellington, and the Home Secretary, Sir Robert Peel, who had previously opposed Catholic participation in Parliament, saw that denying O'Connell his seat would cause outrage and could lead to another rebellion or uprising in Ireland, which was about 85% Catholic. This led directly to the Roman Catholic Relief Act 1829.

In the following by-election, in July 1829, O'Connell was elected unopposed.
