= Roman Catholic Relief Act 1829 =

Act of the Parliament of the United Kingdom

Roman Catholic Relief Act 1829 (Note: The citation of this act by this short title was authorised by section 1 of, and the first schedule to, the Short Titles Act 1896. Due to the repeal of those provisions it is now authorised by section 19(2) of the Interpretation Act 1978.)
- Act of Parliament
- Parliament of the United Kingdom
- Long title: An Act for the Relief of His Majesty's Roman Catholic Subjects.
- Citation: 10 Geo. 4. c. 7
- Introduced by: Duke of Wellington (Lords)
- Territorial extent: United Kingdom

Dates
- Royal assent: 13 April 1829
- Commencement: 24 April 1829 (Note: Section 40.)
Other legislation
Amended by	Irish Church Act 1869; Universities Tests Act 1871; Promissory Oaths Act 1871; Statute Law Revision Act 1873; Statute Law Revision Act 1890; Statute Law Revision Act 1891; Supreme Court of Judicature (Consolidation) Act 1925; Roman Catholic Relief Act 1926; Statute Law Revision Act 1950; Statute Law Revision Act 1953; Statute Law (Repeals) Act 1973; Statute Law Revision (Northern Ireland) Act 1976; Judicature (Northern Ireland) Act 1978; Statute Law (Repeals) Act 1978; Supreme Court of Judicature Act (Ireland) 1877; Statute Law Revision (Northern Ireland) Act 1980; Statute Law Revision Act 1983; Patronage (Benefices) Measure 1986; House of Commons (Removal of Clergy Disqualification) Act 2001; Church of Scotland (Lord High Commissioner) Act 2025
Relates to	Parliamentary Elections (Ireland) Act 1829; Roman Catholics Act 1844

Status: Amended

Text of statute as originally enacted

Revised text of statute as amended

Text of the Roman Catholic Relief Act 1829 as in force today (including any amendments) within the United Kingdom, from legislation.gov.uk.

The Roman Catholic Relief Act 1829 (10 Geo. 4. c. 7), also known as the Catholic Emancipation Act 1829, is an act of the Parliament of the United Kingdom that removed the sacramental tests that barred Roman Catholics in the United Kingdom of Great Britain and Ireland from Parliament and from higher offices of the judiciary and state. It was the culmination of a fifty-year process of Catholic emancipation during which Catholics had been progressively relieved of their civil and political disabilities under the penal laws of what had been, until 1801, the formally separate kingdoms of Great Britain and of Ireland.

Convinced that the measure was essential to maintain order in Catholic-majority Ireland, the prime minister, the Duke of Wellington, helped to overcome the opposition of George IV and the House of Lords by threatening to resign and retire the Tory government he led in favour of what would have been a new, reform-minded Whig ministry.

In Ireland the Protestant Ascendancy had the assurance of the simultaneous passage of the Parliamentary Elections (Ireland) Act 1829. Its substitution of the British ten-pound, for the Irish forty shilling, freehold qualification disenfranchised over eighty per cent of Ireland's electorate. This included a majority of the tenant farmers who had helped force the issue of emancipation in 1828 by electing to parliament the leader of the Catholic Association, Daniel O'Connell.

== Agitation and concession ==
In Great Britain the first Roman Catholic relief act was the Papists Act 1778; subject to an oath renouncing Stuart claims to the throne and the civil jurisdiction of the pope, Catholics were again permitted to own property and inherit land. Many of remaining restrictions on their participation in public life and the professions were removed under the Roman Catholic Relief Act 1791 passed by the Parliament of Great Britain, and the Roman Catholic Relief Act 1793 passed by the Parliament of Ireland. These acts preceded the Acts of Union 1800 which created the United Kingdom of Great Britain and Ireland in 1801. The Oath of Supremacy, declaring allegiance to the monarch as Supreme Governor of the Church, continued to bar Catholics from the higher offices of state and from taking seats in parliament.

Daniel O'Connell (1775–1847), an Irish barrister and leader of the Catholic Association, had rejected a suggestion from "friends of emancipation", and from the English Catholic bishop, John Milner, that the fear of Catholic advancement might be allayed if the Crown were accorded the same right exercised by continental monarchs: a veto on the confirmation of Catholic bishops. O'Connell insisted that Irish Catholics would rather "remain forever without emancipation" than allow the government "to interfere" with the appointment of their senior clergy. In Ireland, he relied on their confidence in the independence of the priesthood from Ascendancy landowners and magistrates to build his Catholic Association into a mass political movement. On the basis of a "Catholic rent" of a penny a month (typically paid through the local priest), the Association mobilised not only the Catholic middle class, but also poorer tenant farmers and tradesmen. Their investment enabled O'Connell to mount "monster" rallies (crowds of over 100,000) that stayed the hands of authorities, and emboldened larger enfranchised tenants to vote for pro-emancipation candidates in defiance of their landlords.

His campaign reached its climax when he himself stood for Parliament. In July 1828 O'Connell defeated William Vesey Fitzgerald, who was standing for re-election in a ministerial by-election, in a County Clare by-election, 2057 votes to 982. This made a direct issue of the parliamentary Oath of Supremacy by which, as a Catholic, he would be denied his seat in the House of Commons.

As Lord Lieutenant of Ireland, Wellington's brother, Richard Wellesley, had attempted to placate Catholic opinion, notably by dismissing the long-serving Attorney-General for Ireland, William Saurin, whose rigid Ascendancy views and policy made him bitterly unpopular, and by applying a policy of prohibitions and coercion against not only the Catholic Ribbonmen but also the Protestant Orangemen. But now both Wellington and his Home Secretary, Robert Peel, were convinced that unless concessions were made, a confrontation was inevitable. Peel (nicknamed "Orange Peel" by O'Connell on account of his anti-Catholic views) concluded: "though emancipation was a great danger, civil strife was a greater danger".

Fearing insurrection in Ireland, Peel drafted the Relief Bill and guided it through the Commons. To overcome the vehement opposition of both George IV and of the House of Lords, Wellington threatened to resign, potentially opening the way for a new Whig majority with designs not only for Catholic emancipation but also for parliamentary reform. The king initially accepted Wellington's resignation and the Duke of Cumberland, brother to the king and Orange Order Grand Master, attempted to put together a government united against Catholic emancipation. Although such a government would have had considerable support in the Lords, it would have had little support in the Commons, and Cumberland abandoned his attempt. The king recalled Wellington. The bill passed the Lords and became law.

== Provisions and assurances ==
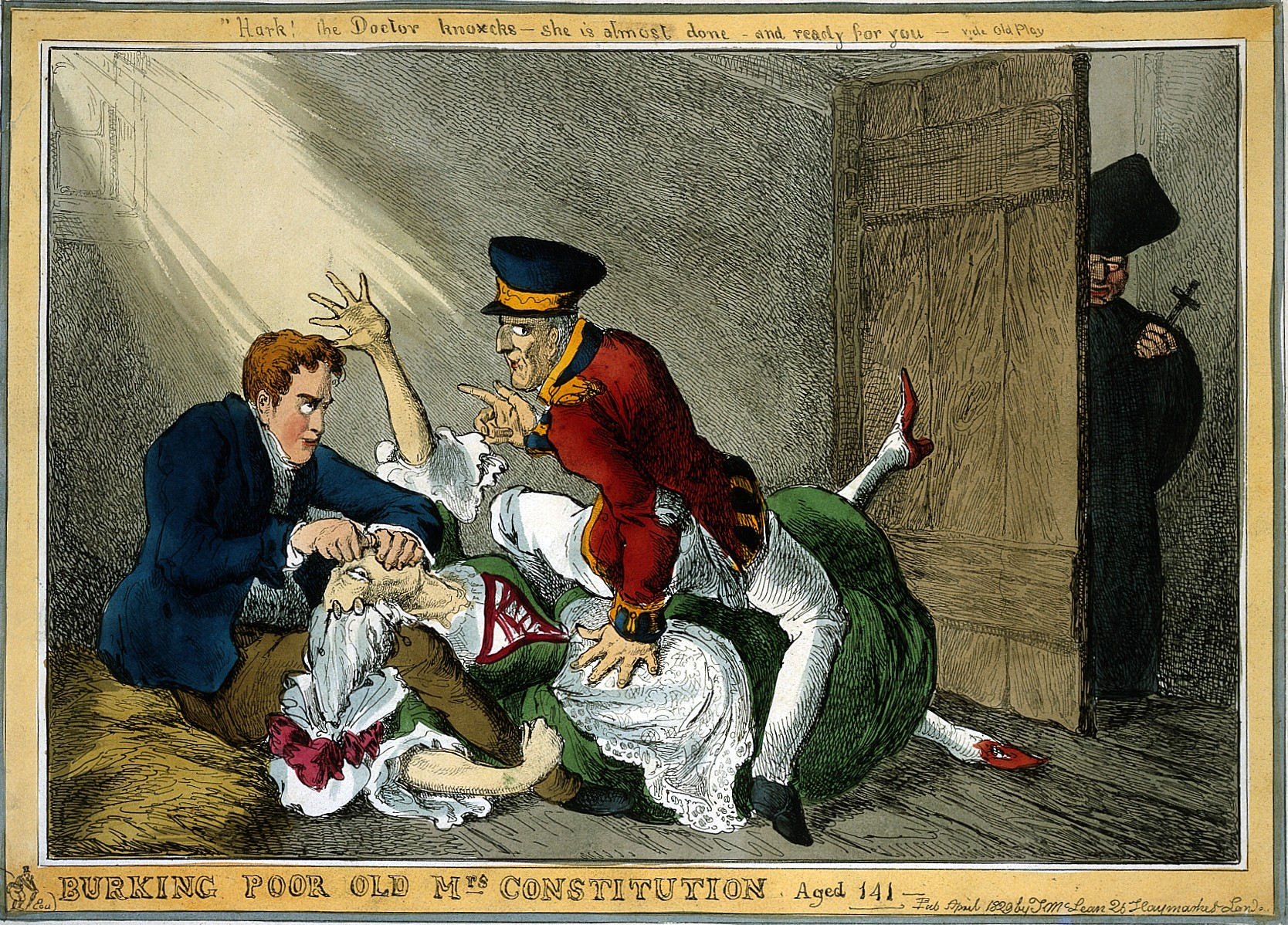
Burking Poor Old Mrs Constitution by William Heath. Heath portrays Peel and Wellington as the murderers Burke and Hare, killing the constitution (aged 141, ie. born in 1688).

The key, defining, provision of the act was its repeal of "certain oaths and certain declarations, commonly called the declarations against transubstantiation and the invocation of saints and the sacrifice of the mass, as practised in the Church of Rome", which had been required "as qualifications for sitting and voting in parliament and for the enjoyment of certain offices, franchises, and civil rights". For the Oath of Supremacy, the act substituted a pledge to bear "true allegiance" to the King, to recognise the Hanoverian succession, to reject any claim to "temporal or civil jurisdiction" within the United Kingdom by "the Pope of Rome" or "any other foreign prince ... or potentate", and to "abjure any intention to subvert the present [Anglican] church establishment".

This last abjuration in the new Oath of Allegiance was underscored by a provision forbidding the assumption by the Catholic Church of episcopal titles, derived from "any city, town or place", already used by the United Church of England and Ireland (i.e. the established Anglican communion). With other sectarian impositions of the act, such as restrictions on admittance to Catholic religious orders and on Catholic-church processions, this was repealed with the Roman Catholic Relief Act 1926.

The one major security required to pass the act was the Parliamentary Elections (Ireland) Act 1829 (10 Geo. 4. c. 8). Receiving its royal assent on the same day as the relief bill, the act disenfranchised Ireland's Forty-shilling freeholders, by raising the property threshold for the county vote to the British £10 standard. As a result, "emancipation" was accompanied by a more than five-fold decrease in the Irish electorate, from 216,000 voters to just 37,000. That the majority of the tenant farmers who had voted for O'Connell in the County Clare by-election were disenfranchised was not made immediately apparent, as O'Connell was permitted, in July 1829, to stand unopposed in the 1829 County Clare by-election for the seat that his refusal to take the Oath of Supremacy had denied him the year before.

== Political results ==
The historian J. C. D. Clark depicts England before 1828 as a nation in which the vast majority of the people still believed in the divine right of kings, and the legitimacy of a hereditary nobility, and in the rights and privileges of the Church of England. In Clark's interpretation, the system remained virtually intact until, in 1828, Catholic emancipation undermined its central symbolic prop, the Anglican supremacy. Clark argues that the consequences were enormous: "The shattering of a whole social order ... What was lost at that point ... was not merely a constitutional arrangement, but the intellectual ascendancy of a worldview, the cultural hegemony of the old elite."

Clark's interpretation has been widely debated in the scholarly literature. Other historians examining the issue highlight the amount of continuity before and after the period of 1828 through 1832. The historian Eric J. Evans emphasises that the political importance of emancipation was that it split the anti-reformers beyond repair and diminished their ability to block future reform laws, especially the Reform Act 1832. Paradoxically, Wellington's success in forcing through emancipation led many Ultra-Tories to demand reform of Parliament after seeing that the votes of the rotten boroughs had given the government its majority. Thus, it was an ultra-Tory, the Marquess of Blandford, who in February 1830 introduced the first major reform bill, calling for the transfer of rotten borough seats to the counties and large towns, the disfranchisement of non-resident voters, the preventing of Crown office-holders from sitting in Parliament, the payment of a salary to MPs, and a general franchise for men who owned property. The ultras believed that a widely based electorate could be relied upon to rally around anti-Catholicism.

In Ireland, emancipation is generally regarded as having come too late to influence the Catholic-majority view of the union. After a delay of thirty years, an opportunity to integrate Catholics through their re-emerging propertied and professional classes as a minority within the United Kingdom may have passed. In 1830 O'Connell invited Protestants to join in a campaign to repeal the Act of Union and restore the Kingdom of Ireland under the Constitution of 1782, but his former ally, George Ensor, argued that in breaking the link between Catholic inclusion and democratic reform, the terms under which he was able to secure the final measure of relief weakened the case for restoring an Irish parliament.

Ensor, a leading Protestant member of the Catholic Association in Ulster, protested "relief" being bought at the price of "casting" forty-shilling freeholders, both Catholic and Protestant, "into the abyss". While it allowed a few Catholic barristers to attain a higher grade in their profession, and a few Catholic gentlemen to be returned to Parliament, the "indifference" demonstrated to parliamentary reform would prove "disastrous" for the cause of repeal.

Seeking, perhaps, to rationalise the sacrifice of his freeholders, O'Connell wrote privately in March 1829 that the new ten-pound franchise might actually "give more power to Catholics by concentrating it in more reliable and less democratically dangerous hands". A Young Irelander named John Mitchel believed that this was the intent: to detach propertied Catholics from the increasingly agitated rural masses.

In a pattern that had been intensifying from the 1820s as landlords cleared land to meet the growing livestock demand from England, tenants had been banding together to oppose evictions, and to attack tithe and process servers. On his visit to Ireland, Alexis De Tocqueville recorded these Whiteboys and Ribbonmen protesting:

The law does nothing for us. We must save ourselves. We have a little land which we need for ourselves and our families to live on, and they drive us out of it. To whom should we address ourselves?... Emancipation has done nothing for us. Mr. O'Connell and the rich Catholics go to Parliament. We die of starvation just the same.

== Subsequent developments ==
One civil disability not removed by 1829 act were the sacramental tests required for professorships, fellowships, studentships and other lay offices at universities. These were abolished for the English universities—Oxford, Cambridge and Durham—by the Universities Tests Act 1871 (34 & 35 Vict. c. 26), and for Trinity College Dublin by the University of Dublin Tests Act 1873 (36 & 37 Vict. c. 21).

So much of the act "as relates to any of the said universities or any college therein" was repealed by section 8 of, and the schedule to, the Universities Tests Act 1871 (34 & 35 Vict. c. 26), which came into force on 16 June 1871.

The whole act, except section 2, down to the words "vote therein;" section 5, down to the words "duly qualified;" section 8, down to the words "duly qualified;" section 9; section 10, down to the words "as herein-after excepted;" sections 11–18; section 23, down to the words "His Majesty's other subjects;" section 24; sections 26–38, and the schedule, was repealed by section 1 of, and part II of schedule one to, the Promissory Oaths Act 1871, which came into force on 13 July 1871.

In section 12, the words "or Ireland." were repealed by section 1(1) of, and the first schedule to, the Statute Law Revision Act 1950, which came into force on 23 May 1950.

Sections 26 and 28–37 of, and the schedule to, the act, so far as unrepealed, were repealed by section 1 of, and the first schedule to, the Statute Law Revision Act 1953, which came into force on 18 December 1953.

In section 5, the words from "and also to vote" to "such representative peers" were repealed by section 1(1) of, and part XIII of schedule 1 to, the Statute Law (Repeals) Act 1973, which came into force on 18 July 1973.

The preamble to, sections 2, 5 and 11 of, in section 16, the words from "or any office", where they first occur, to "within this realm", and sections 23 and 24 of, the act were repealed by section 1(1) of, and part XVI of schedule 1 to, the Statute Law (Repeals) Act 1978, which came into force on 31 July 1978.

Section 18 of the 1829 act, "No Roman Catholic to advise the Crown in the appointment to offices in the established church", remains in force in England, Wales and Scotland, but was repealed with respect to Northern Ireland (the Church of Ireland having been disestablished in 1869) by the Statute Law Revision (Northern Ireland) Act 1980. The entire act was repealed in the Republic of Ireland by the Statute Law Revision Act 1983.

In February 2025 the UK Government introduced a bill in the House of Commons to repeal a clause from Section 12 of the act, to allow Catholics to hold the office of His Majesty's Lord High Commissioner to the General Assembly of the Church of Scotland. The amendments were made after it was announced that Lady Elish Angiolini KC was expected to be the first Catholic to be appointed to the position.

In September 2026 Prime Minister Andy Burnham announced plans to allow Catholics and Jews to advise the Sovereign on appointments to the Church of England and Church of Scotland, claiming it is "unacceptable for there to be a legislative bar against people of any faith performing all the functions of my office". He confirmed that responsibility for Church appointments has been delegated to the Lord Chancellor. A bill was introduced and passed through the Commons on 21 October 2026.

== See also ==
- Papists Act 1778
- Religious Disabilities Act 1846
- Jews Relief Act 1858, which contains similar provision for Jews
