= Parliamentary Boundaries (Ireland) Act 1832 =

UK law defining Irish electoral divisions

Parliamentary Boundaries (Ireland) Act 1832 (Note: The citation of this act by this short title was authorised by section 1 of, and the first schedule to, the Short Titles Act 1896. Due to the repeal of those provisions it is now authorised by section 19(2) of the Interpretation Act 1978.)
- Act of Parliament
- Parliament of the United Kingdom
- Long title: An Act to settle and describe the limits of cities, towns, and boroughs in Ireland, in so far as respects the election of Members to serve in Parliament.
- Citation: 2 & 3 Will. 4. c. 89

Dates
- Royal assent: 7 August 1832
- Commencement: 7 August 1832 (Note: The Acts of Parliament (Commencement) Act 1793.)
- Repealed: Northern Ireland: 23 May 1950; Republic of Ireland: 9 December 1963
Other legislation
Amended by	University of Dublin Registration Act 1842; Statute Law Revision Act 1890
Repealed by	Northern Ireland: Statute Law Revision Act 1874 and Statute Law Revision Act 1950; Republic of Ireland: Electoral Act 1963
Relates to	Parliamentary Elections (Ireland) Act 1829; Representation of the People (Ireland) Act 1832

Status: Repealed

Text of statute as originally enacted

The Parliamentary Boundaries (Ireland) Act 1832 (2 & 3 Will. 4. c. 89) was an act of the Parliament of the United Kingdom which defined the boundaries of the 33 parliamentary boroughs which were represented in the United Kingdom House of Commons under the Acts of Union 1800. It followed a boundary report. Section 12 of the Representation of the People (Ireland) Act 1832, enacted on the same day, specified that the boundaries were to be defined in this separate act.

It was enacted a month after the Parliamentary Boundaries Act 1832, which had set out the boundaries of constituencies in England and Wales as required by the Reform Act 1832.

From 1801, the parliamentary boroughs of Dublin City and Cork City each had two MPs. Under section 11 of the Representation of the People (Ireland) Act 1832, a second seat was granted to the boroughs of Belfast, Galway, Limerick City, and Waterford. Each of the 32 counties of Ireland continued to send two MPs to Westminster. Overall, the Representation of the People (Ireland) Act 1832 increased the representation of Ireland from 100 to 105, with Dublin University also increasing its representation from one to two MPs.

The 1832 general election was held later that year under the new boundaries.

Under the Sligo and Cashel Disfranchisement Act 1870, the boroughs of Cashel and Sligo were disfranchised due to corruption.

Under the Redistribution of Seats Act 1885, which took effect at the 1885 general election, 22 of the Irish parliamentary boroughs ceased to exist, with the area becoming part of the relevant county.

The whole act, so far as unrepealed, was repealed by section 1(1) of, and the first schedule to, the Statute Law Revision Act 1950, which came into force on 23 May 1950.

The whole act was repealed for the Republic of Ireland by section 3 of, and the first schedule to, the Electoral Act 1963, which came into force on 9 December 1963.

== See also ==
- List of acts of the Parliament of the United Kingdom
