= List of acts of the Parliament of the United Kingdom from 1832 =

This is a complete list of acts of the Parliament of the United Kingdom for the year 1832.

Note that the first parliament of the United Kingdom was held in 1801; parliaments between 1707 and 1800 were either parliaments of Great Britain or of Ireland). For acts passed up until 1707, see the list of acts of the Parliament of England and the list of acts of the Parliament of Scotland. For acts passed from 1707 to 1800, see the list of acts of the Parliament of Great Britain. See also the list of acts of the Parliament of Ireland.

For acts of the devolved parliaments and assemblies in the United Kingdom, see the list of acts of the Scottish Parliament, the list of acts of the Northern Ireland Assembly, and the list of acts and measures of Senedd Cymru; see also the list of acts of the Parliament of Northern Ireland.

The number shown after each act's title is its chapter number. Acts passed before 1963 are cited using this number, preceded by the year(s) of the reign during which the relevant parliamentary session was held; thus the Union with Ireland Act 1800 is cited as "39 & 40 Geo. 3 c. 67", meaning the 67th act passed during the session that started in the 39th year of the reign of George III and which finished in the 40th year of that reign. Note that the modern convention is to use Arabic numerals in citations (thus "41 Geo. 3" rather than "41 Geo. III"). Acts of the last session of the Parliament of Great Britain and the first session of the Parliament of the United Kingdom are both cited as "41 Geo. 3". Acts passed from 1963 onwards are simply cited by calendar year and chapter number.

All modern acts have a short title, e.g. the Local Government Act 2003. Some earlier acts also have a short title given to them by later acts, such as by the Short Titles Act 1896.

== 2 & 3 Will. 4 ==
The second session of the 10th Parliament of the United Kingdom, which met from 6 December 1831 until 16 August 1832.

This session was also traditionally cited as 2 & 3 Gul. 4, 2 & 3 Wm. 4, 2 & 3 W. 4, 2 Will. 4, 2 Gul. 4, 2 Wm. 4 or 2 W. 4.

=== Public general acts ===
Short title	Citation	Royal assent
Long title
Crown Lands Act 1832 (repealed)	2 & 3 Will. 4. c. 1	13 February 1832
An Act for uniting the Office of the Surveyor General of His Majesty's Works and Public Buildings with the Office of the Commissioners of His Majesty's Woods, Forests, and Land Revenues; and for other Purposes relating to the Land Revenues. (Repealed by Crown Estate Act 1961 (9 & 10 Eliz. 2. c. 55))
Lotteries Act 1832 (repealed)	2 & 3 Will. 4. c. 2	13 February 1832
An Act to provide for the taking in and Payment of outstanding Lottery Tickets. (Repealed by Statute Law Revision Act 1874 (37 & 38 Vict. c. 35))
Buckingham Palace Act 1832 (repealed)	2 & 3 Will. 4. c. 3	13 February 1832
An Act to authorize the Application of Part of the Land Revenue of the Crown for the Completion of the Repair and Improvement of Buckingham Palace. (Repealed by Statute Law Revision Act 1874 (37 & 38 Vict. c. 35))
Embezzlement Act 1832 (repealed)	2 & 3 Will. 4. c. 4	13 February 1832
An Act for more effectually preventing Embezzlements by Persons employed in the Public Service of His Majesty. (Repealed by Statute Law Revision Act 1891 (54 & 55 Vict. c. 67))
Court of Session Act 1832 (repealed)	2 & 3 Will. 4. c. 5	13 February 1832
An Act to provide for carrying on the Business of the Court of Session in Scotland when interrupted by the Death or necessary Absence of any of the Judges thereof. (Repealed by Court of Session Act 1988 (c. 36))
Supply Act 1832 (repealed)	2 & 3 Will. 4. c. 6	20 February 1832
An Act to apply certain Sums to the Service of the Year One thousand eight hundred and thirty-two. (Repealed by Statute Law Revision Act 1874 (37 & 38 Vict. c. 35))
Sacramental Test (Ireland) Act 1832 (repealed)	2 & 3 Will. 4. c. 7	20 February 1832
An Act for the Relief of His Majesty's Subjects in Ireland being Protestants of the Established Church, and to repeal an Act passed in the Parliament of Ireland in the Thirty-third Year of the Reign of His Majesty King George the Third, intituled "An Act to remove some Doubts respecting Persons in Office taking the Sacramental Test." (Note: Sacramental Test Act 1793 (33 Geo. 3. c. 51 (I))) (Repealed by Promissory Oaths Act 1871 (34 & 35 Vict. c. 48))
Duties on Personal Estates, etc. (England) Act 1832 (repealed)	2 & 3 Will. 4. c. 8	20 February 1832
An Act for continuing to His Majesty for One Year certain Duties on Personal Estates, Offices, and Pensions in England, for the Service of the Year One thousand eight hundred and thirty-two. (Repealed by Statute Law Revision Act 1874 (37 & 38 Vict. c. 35))
Fever Hospitals (Ireland) Act 1832 (repealed)	2 & 3 Will. 4. c. 9	20 February 1832
An Act to amend Two Acts passed in the Fifty-eighth (Note: Hospitals (Ireland) Act 1818 (58 Geo. 3. c. 47)) and Fifty-ninth (Note: Contagious Diseases (Ireland) Act 1819 (59 Geo. 3. c. 41)) Years of the Reign of His Majesty King George the Third, for establishing Fever Hospitals and for preventing contagious Diseases in Ireland. (Repealed by Statute Law Revision Act 1874 (37 & 38 Vict. c. 35))
Cholera Prevention (England) Act 1832 (repealed)	2 & 3 Will. 4. c. 10	20 February 1832
An Act for the Prevention, as far as may be possible, of the Disease called the Cholera, or Spasmodic or Indian Cholera, in England. (Repealed by Statute Law Revision Act 1874 (37 & 38 Vict. c. 35))
Cholera Prevention (Scotland) Act 1832 (repealed)	2 & 3 Will. 4. c. 11	20 February 1832
An Act for the Prevention, as far as may be possible, of the Disease called the Cholera, or Spasmodic or Indian Cholera, in Scotland. (Repealed by Statute Law Revision Act 1874 (37 & 38 Vict. c. 35))
Exchequer Bills Act 1832 (repealed)	2 & 3 Will. 4. c. 12	20 February 1832
An Act for raising the Sum of Twelve Millions by Exchequer Bills, for the Service of the Year One thousand eight hundred and thirty-two. (Repealed by Statute Law Revision Act 1874 (37 & 38 Vict. c. 35))
Presentments, etc. (Ireland) Act 1832 (repealed)	2 & 3 Will. 4. c. 13	20 February 1832
An Act to repeal so much of an Act, passed in the Parliament of Ireland in the Twenty-sixth Year of the Reign of His Majesty King George the Third, (Note: County Dublin Roads Act 1786 (26 Geo. 3. c. 14 (I))) as provides for the applotting and levying of Presentments off the Baronies. (Repealed by Statute Law Revision Act 1861 (24 & 25 Vict. c. 101))
Revenue Buildings, Liverpool Act 1832 (repealed)	2 & 3 Will. 4. c. 14	24 March 1832
An Act to authorize the Payment out of the Consolidated Fund of a Sum of Money towards the Erection of certain Revenue Buildings at Liverpool. (Repealed by Statute Law Revision Act 1874 (37 & 38 Vict. c. 35))
Post Office Act 1832 (repealed)	2 & 3 Will. 4. c. 15	24 March 1832
An Act to enable His Majesty's Postmaster General to extend the Accommodation by Post, and to regulate the Privilege of Franking, in Ireland; and for other Purposes relating to the Post Office. (Repealed by Post Office (Repeal of Laws) Act 1837 (7 Will. 4 & 1 Vict. c. 32))
Excise Permit Act 1832 (repealed)	2 & 3 Will. 4. c. 16	24 March 1832
An Act to consolidate and amend the Laws regulating the granting and issuing of Permits for the Removal of Goods under the Laws of Excise. (Repealed by Statute Law (Repeals) Act 1993 (c. 50))
Assignment, etc., of Leases (Ireland) Act 1832 (repealed)	2 & 3 Will. 4. c. 17	24 March 1832
An Act to repeal an Act passed in the Seventh Year of His late Majesty King George the Fourth, intituled "An Act to amend the Law of Ireland respecting the Assignment and Subletting of Lands and Tenements;" (Note: Assignment and Sub-letting of Land (Ireland) Act 1826 (7 Geo. 4. c. 29)) and to substitute other Provisions in lieu thereof. (Repealed by Statute Law Revision Act 1874 (37 & 38 Vict. c. 35))
Mutiny Act Continuance Act 1832 (repealed)	2 & 3 Will. 4. c. 18	24 March 1832
An Act for continuing an Act passed in the First Year of His present Majesty, (Note: Mutiny Act 1831 (1 Will. 4. c. 15)) for punishing Mutiny and Desertion, and for the better Payment of the Army and their Quarters. (Repealed by Statute Law Revision Act 1874 (37 & 38 Vict. c. 35))
Marine Mutiny Act Continuance Act 1832 (repealed)	2 & 3 Will. 4. c. 19	24 March 1832
An Act for continuing an Act passed in the First Year of His present Majesty, (Note: Marine Mutiny Act 1831 (1 Will. 4. c. 14)) for the Regulation of His Majesty's Royal Marine Forces while on Shore. (Repealed by Statute Law Revision Act 1874 (37 & 38 Vict. c. 35))
Irish Tobacco Act 1832 (repealed)	2 & 3 Will. 4. c. 20	24 March 1832
An Act to provide for the Sale, Manufacture, and Consumption of Tobacco grown in Ireland before the First Day of January One thousand eight hundred and thirty-two. (Repealed by Statute Law Revision Act 1874 (37 & 38 Vict. c. 35))
Coal Trade (Ireland) Act 1832 (repealed)	2 & 3 Will. 4. c. 21	24 March 1832
An Act to repeal several Acts of the Parliament of Ireland imposing Restrictions upon the Coal Trade, and to regulate the same. (Repealed by Statute Law Revision Act 1874 (37 & 38 Vict. c. 35), Statute Law Revision (No. 2) Act 1888 (51 & 52 Vict. c. 57), Statute Law Revision (No. 2) Act 1890 (53 & 54 Vict. c. 51) and Statute Law Revision Act 1953 (2 & 3 Eliz. 2. c. 5))
Sugar Duties Act 1832 (repealed)	2 & 3 Will. 4. c. 22	3 April 1832
An Act for granting to His Majesty, until the Tenth Day of October One thousand eight hundred and thirty-two, certain Duties on Sugar imported into the United Kingdom, for the Service of the Year One thousand eight hundred and thirty-two. (Repealed by Statute Law Revision Act 1874 (37 & 38 Vict. c. 35))
Marine Mutiny Act 1832 (repealed)	2 & 3 Will. 4. c. 23	9 April 1832
An Act for the Regulation of His Majesty's Royal Marine Forces while on Shore. (Repealed by Statute Law Revision Act 1874 (37 & 38 Vict. c. 35))
Indemnity Act 1832 (repealed)	2 & 3 Will. 4. c. 24	9 April 1832
An Act to indemnify such Persons in the United Kingdom as have omitted to qualify themselves for Offices and Employments, and for extending the Time limited for those Purposes respectively until the Twenty-fifth Day of March One thousand eight hundred and thirty-three; to permit such Persons in Great Britain as have omitted to make and file Affidavits of the Execution of Indentures of Clerks to Attorneys and Solicitors to make and file the same on or before the First Day of Hilary Term One thousand eight hundred and thirty-three; and to allow Persons to make and file such Affidavits, although the Persons whom they served shall have neglected to take out their Annual Certificates. (Repealed by Promissory Oaths Act 1871 (34 & 35 Vict. c. 48))
Ordnance Department Act 1832 (repealed)	2 & 3 Will. 4. c. 25	9 April 1832
An Act to extend and render more effectual Two Acts of the First and Second (Note: Ordnance Property Act 1821 (1 & 2 Geo. 4. c. 69)) and Third (Note: Property Occupied for Barrack Service Act 1822 (3 Geo. 4. c. 108)) Years of His late Majesty King George the Fourth, respecting the Estates thereby vested in the principal Officers of the Ordnance, and to facilitate the public Business in the Ordnance Department. (Repealed by Defence Act 1842 (5 & 6 Vict. c. 94))
Colonial Audit Revenues Act 1832 (repealed)	2 & 3 Will. 4. c. 26	9 April 1832
An Act to authorize the Commissioners for auditing the Public Accounts of Great Britain to examine and audit Accounts of the Receipt and Expenditure of Colonial Revenues. (Repealed by Exchequer and Audit Departments Act 1866 (29 & 30 Vict. c. 39))
Cholera Prevention Amendment (Scotland) Act 1832 (repealed)	2 & 3 Will. 4. c. 27	9 April 1832
An Act for altering and amending an Act passed in the present Session of Parliament, (Note: Cholera Prevention (Scotland) Act 1832 (2 & 3 Will. 4. c. 11)) for the Prevention, as far as may be possible, of the Disease called the Cholera, or Spasmodic or Indian Cholera, in Scotland. (Repealed by Statute Law Revision Act 1874 (37 & 38 Vict. c. 35))
Mutiny Act 1832 (repealed)	2 & 3 Will. 4. c. 28	9 April 1832
An Act for punishing Mutiny and Desertion; and for the better Payment of the Army and their Quarters. (Repealed by Statute Law Revision Act 1874 (37 & 38 Vict. c. 35))
Spirits, (Scotland): Spirits (Ireland) Act 1832 (repealed)	2 & 3 Will. 4. c. 29	9 April 1832
An Act to reduce the Allowance on Spirits made from Malt only in Scotland and Ireland. (Repealed by Statute Law Revision Act 1874 (37 & 38 Vict. c. 35))
Supply (No. 2) Act 1832 (repealed)	2 & 3 Will. 4. c. 30	9 April 1832
An Act to apply the Sum of Three Millions, out of the Consolidated Fund, to the Service of the Year One thousand eight hundred and thirty-two. (Repealed by Statute Law Revision Act 1874 (37 & 38 Vict. c. 35))
Baking Trade (Ireland) Act 1832 (repealed)	2 & 3 Will. 4. c. 31	23 May 1832
An Act to regulate the Baking Trade in Ireland. (Repealed by Statute Law Revision Act 1861 (24 & 25 Vict. c. 101))
Nisi Prius Court House, Dublin Act 1832 (repealed)	2 & 3 Will. 4. c. 32	23 May 1832
An Act for the Erection of a Nisi Prius Court House in Dublin. (Repealed by Statute Law Revision Act 1890 (53 & 54 Vict. c. 33))
Service of Process out of the Jurisdiction (England and Ireland) Act 1832 (repealed)	2 & 3 Will. 4. c. 33	23 May 1832
An Act to effectuate the Service of Process issuing from the Courts of Chancery and Exchequer in England and Ireland respectively. (Repealed by Statute Law Revision Act 1890 (53 & 54 Vict. c. 33))
Coinage Offences Act 1832 (repealed)	2 & 3 Will. 4. c. 34	23 May 1832
An Act for consolidating and amending the Laws against Offences relating to the Coin. (Repealed by Criminal Statutes Repeal Act 1861 (24 & 25 Vict. c. 95))
Payment of Creditors (Scotland) Act 1832 (repealed)	2 & 3 Will. 4. c. 35	23 May 1832
An Act to continue until the Fifth Day of March One thousand eight hundred and thirty-three, and from thence to the End of the then next Session of Parliament, an Act of the Fifty-fourth Year of King George the Third, (Note: Payment of Creditors (Scotland) Act 1813 (54 Geo. 3. c. 65)) for rendering the Payment of Creditors more equal and expeditious in Scotland. (Repealed by Statute Law Revision Act 1874 (37 & 38 Vict. c. 35))
Barbadoes, etc., Importation Act 1832 (repealed)	2 & 3 Will. 4. c. 36	23 May 1832
An Act to allow the Importation of Lumber, and of Fish and Provisions, Duty-free, into the Islands of Barbadoes, Saint Vincent, and Saint Lucia; and to indemnify the Governors and others of those Islands for having permitted the Importation of those Articles Duty-free. (Repealed by Statute Law Revision Act 1874 (37 & 38 Vict. c. 35))
Friendly Societies Act 1832 (repealed)	2 & 3 Will. 4. c. 37	23 May 1832
An Act to amend an Act of the Tenth Year of His late Majesty King George the Fourth, (Note: Friendly Societies Act 1829 (10 Geo. 4. c. 56)) by extending the Time within which pre-existing Societies must conform to the Provisions of that Act. (Repealed by Friendly Societies Act 1855 (18 & 19 Vict. c. 63))
Insolvent Debtors (Ireland) Act 1832 (repealed)	2 & 3 Will. 4. c. 38	23 May 1832
An Act to continue for One Year, and from thence until the End of the then next Session of Parliament, the Acts for the Relief of Insolvent Debtors in Ireland. (Repealed by Statute Law Revision Act 1874 (37 & 38 Vict. c. 35))
Process in Courts of Law at Westminster Act 1832 or the Uniformity of Process Act 1832 (repealed)	2 & 3 Will. 4. c. 39	23 May 1832
An Act for Uniformity of Process in Personal Actions in His Majesty's Courts of Law at Westminster. (Repealed by Civil Procedure Acts Repeal Act 1879 (42 & 43 Vict. c. 59))
Admiralty Act 1832 (repealed)	2 & 3 Will. 4. c. 40	1 June 1832
An Act to amend the Laws relating to the Business of the Civil Departments of the Navy, and to make other Regulations for more effectually carrying on the Duties of the said Departments. (Repealed by Defence (Transfer of Functions) (No. 1) Order 1964 (SI 1964/488))
Recovery of Tithes (Ireland) Act 1832 (repealed)	2 & 3 Will. 4. c. 41	1 June 1832
An Act to facilitate the Recovery of Tithes in certain Cases in Ireland, and for Relief of the Clergy of the Established Church. (Repealed by Statute Law Revision Act 1861 (24 & 25 Vict. c. 101))
Allotments Act 1832 (repealed)	2 & 3 Will. 4. c. 42	1 June 1832
An Act to authorize (in Parishes inclosed under any Act of Parliament) the letting of the Poor Allotments in small Portions to industrious Cottagers. (Repealed by Statute Law (Repeals) Act 1993 (c. 50))
Insolvent Debtors Act 1832 (repealed)	2 & 3 Will. 4. c. 43	1 June 1832
An Act to continue until the First Day of March One thousand eight hundred and thirty-six an Act of the Ninth Year of His late Majesty, (Note: Insolvent Debtors (East Indies) Act 1828 (9 Geo. 4. c. 73)) for the Relief of Insolvent Debtors in India. (Repealed by Statute Law Revision Act 1874 (37 & 38 Vict. c. 35))
Insolvent Debtors Act 1832 (repealed)	2 & 3 Will. 4. c. 44	6 June 1832
An Act to continue for Three Years, and to amend, the Laws for the Relief of Insolvent Debtors in England. (Repealed by Statute Law Revision Act 1874 (37 & 38 Vict. c. 35))
Representation of the People Act 1832 or the Reform Act 1832 or the Great Reform Act or the First Reform Act (repealed)	2 & 3 Will. 4. c. 45	7 June 1832
An Act to amend the Representation of the People in England and Wales. (Repealed by Representation of the People Act 1948 (11 & 12 Geo. 6. c. 65))
British Museum Act 1832 (repealed)	2 & 3 Will. 4. c. 46	23 June 1832
An Act to enable His Majesty, His Heirs and Successors, to appoint a Trustee of the British Museum. (Repealed by British Museum Act 1963 (c. 24))
Norfolk and Norwich Assizes Act 1832 (repealed)	2 & 3 Will. 4. c. 47	23 June 1832
An Act for holding the Assizes for the County of Norfolk and for the City of Norwich and County of the same City, Twice in every Year at Norwich. (Repealed by Statute Law Revision Act 1890 (53 & 54 Vict. c. 33))
Clerk of the Crown (Ireland) Act 1832 (repealed)	2 & 3 Will. 4. c. 48	23 June 1832
An Act to regulate the Office of Clerk of the Crown in the Court of King's Bench in Ireland. (Repealed by Judicature (Northern Ireland) Act 1978 (c. 23))
Clerks of the Signet, etc. Act 1832 (repealed)	2 & 3 Will. 4. c. 49	23 June 1832
An Act to extend the Provisions of an Act of the Fifty-seventh Year of His Majesty King George the Third, (Note: Offices of Clerks of the Signet, etc. Act 1817 (57 Geo. 3. c. 63)) for regulating the Offices of Clerks of the Signet and Privy Seal. (Repealed by Statute Law Revision Act 1861 (24 & 25 Vict. c. 101))
Militia Ballot Act 1832 (repealed)	2 & 3 Will. 4. c. 50	23 June 1832
An Act to suspend until the End of the next Session of Parliament the making of Lists and the Ballots and Enrolments for the Militia of the United Kingdom. (Repealed by Statute Law Revision Act 1874 (37 & 38 Vict. c. 35))
Vice-Admiralty Courts Act 1832 (repealed)	2 & 3 Will. 4. c. 51	23 June 1832
An Act to regulate the Practice and the Fees in the Vice Admiralty Courts Abroad, and to obviate Doubts as to their Jurisdiction. (Repealed by Colonial Courts of Admiralty Act 1890 (53 & 54 Vict. c. 27))
Grants for Roads, Limerick, Cork and Kerry Act 1832	2 & 3 Will. 4. c. 52	23 June 1832
An Act to promote the Improvement of a District of Mountain Land in the Counties of Limerick, Cork, and Kerry, in Ireland, by making new Roads through the same, and to encourage the Employment of the poor Inhabitants thereof.
Army Prize Money Act 1832 (repealed)	2 & 3 Will. 4. c. 53	23 June 1832
An Act for consolidating and amending the Laws relating to the Payment of Army Prize Money. (Repealed by Statute Law Revision Act 1959 (7 & 8 Eliz. 2. c. 68))
Exchequer Court (Scotland) Act 1832 (repealed)	2 & 3 Will. 4. c. 54	23 June 1832
An Act for making Provision for the Dispatch of the Business now done by the Court of Exchequer in Scotland. (Repealed by Statute Law Revision Act 1874 (37 & 38 Vict. c. 35))
Supply (No. 3) Act 1832 (repealed)	2 & 3 Will. 4. c. 55	23 June 1832
An Act to apply the Sum of Four Millions out of the Consolidated Fund to the Service of the Year One thousand eight hundred and thirty-two. (Repealed by Statute Law Revision Act 1874 (37 & 38 Vict. c. 35))
Regents Park, Regents Street, etc. Act 1832	2 & 3 Will. 4. c. 56	23 June 1832
An Act to extend the Jurisdiction of the Commissioners acting in the Execution of Three Acts (Note: Regent's Park, Regent Street, etc. Act 1824 (5 Geo. 4. c. 100)) (Note: Regent Street, etc. Act 1825 (6 Geo. 4. c. 38)) (Note: Regent Street Act 1828 (9 Geo. 4. c. 64)) for paving and regulating the Regent's Park, and several Streets and Places in Westminster, to certain other Streets and Places in Westminster; and for other Purposes.
Charities Procedure Act 1832	2 & 3 Will. 4. c. 57	23 June 1832
An Act to continue and extend the Provisions of an Act passed in the Fifty-ninth Year of His Majesty King George the Third, (Note: Charity Estates (England) Act 1819 (59 Geo. 3. c. 91)) for giving additional Facilities in Applications to Courts of Equity regarding the Management of Estates or Funds belonging to Charities; and for making certain Provisions respecting Estates or Funds belonging to Charities.
Contempt of Court Act 1832 (repealed)	2 & 3 Will. 4. c. 58	23 June 1832
An Act to extend the Provisions of an Act of the First Year of the Reign of His present Majesty, (Note: Contempt of Court Act 1830 (11 Geo. 4 & 1 Will. 4. c. 36)) for altering and amending the Law regarding Commitments by Courts of Equity for Contempts, and the taking Bills pro Confesso; and to explain certain Parts thereof. (Repealed by Rules of the Supreme Court (Revision) 1965 (SI 1965/1776))
Government Annuities Act 1832 (repealed)	2 & 3 Will. 4. c. 59	4 July 1832
An Act to transfer the Management of certain Annuities on Lives from the Receipt of His Majesty's Exchequer to the Management of the Commissioners for the Reduction of the National Debt; and to amend an Act (Note: Government Annuities Act 1829 (10 Geo. 4. c. 24)) for enabling the said Commissioners to grant Life Annuities and Annuities for Terms of Years. (Repealed by Government Annuities Act 1929 (19 & 20 Geo. 5. c. 29))
King's County Assizes Act 1832	2 & 3 Will. 4. c. 60	4 July 1832
An Act for holding the Assizes for the King's County in Ireland, Twice in every Year, at Tullamoore, instead of Philipstown.
Church Building Act 1832 (repealed)	2 & 3 Will. 4. c. 61	11 July 1832
An Act to render more effectual an Act passed in the Fifty-ninth Year of His late Majesty King George the Third, (Note: Church Building Act 1819 (59 Geo. 3. c. 134)) intituled "An Act to amend and render more effectual an Act passed in the last Session of Parliament (Note: Church Building Act 1818 (58 Geo. 3. c. 45))) for building and promoting the building of additional Churches in populous Parishes." (Repealed by Isle of Man (Church Building and New Parishes) Act 1897 (60 & 61 Vict. c. 33), New Parishes Measure 1943 (No. 1) and Statute Law (Repeals) Act 1974 (c. 22))
Punishment of Death, etc. Act 1832 (repealed)	2 & 3 Will. 4. c. 62	11 July 1832
An Act for abolishing the Punishment of Death in certain Cases, and substituting a lesser Punishment in lieu thereof. (Repealed by Statute Law Revision Act 1874 (37 & 38 Vict. c. 35))
Election of Scottish Peers Act 1832 (repealed)	2 & 3 Will. 4. c. 63	11 July 1832
An Act to enable Peers of Scotland to take and subscribe in Ireland the Oaths required for qualifying them to vote in any Election of the Peers of Scotland. (Repealed by Promissory Oaths Act 1871 (34 & 35 Vict. c. 48))
Parliamentary Boundaries Act 1832 (repealed)	2 & 3 Will. 4. c. 64	11 July 1832
An Act to settle and describe the Divisions of Counties, and the Limits of Cities and Boroughs, in England and Wales, in so far as respects the Election of Members to serve in Parliament. (Repealed by Ballot Act 1872 (35 & 36 Vict. c. 33), Statute Law Revision Act 1874 (37 & 38 Vict. c. 35), Statute Law Revision (No. 2) Act 1888 (51 & 52 Vict. c. 57), Statute Law Revision Act 1890 (53 & 54 Vict. c. 33) and Statute Law Revision Act 1950 (14 Geo. 6. c. 6))
Representation of the People (Scotland) Act 1832 or the Scottish Reform Act 1832 (repealed)	2 & 3 Will. 4. c. 65	17 July 1832
An Act to amend the Representation of the People in Scotland. (Repealed by Statute Law (Repeals) Act 1981 (c. 19))
Quays, etc., Between Tower and London Bridge Act 1832 (repealed)	2 & 3 Will. 4. c. 66	17 July 1832
An Act to provide for the Conveyance of Premises, the Property of the Crown, situate between the Tower of London and London Bridge. (Repealed by Statute Law (Repeals) Act 1993 (c. 50))
Union of Parishes, etc. (Ireland) Act 1832	2 & 3 Will. 4. c. 67	17 July 1832
An Act to amend an Act of the Seventh and Eighth Years of the Reign of His late Majesty King George the Fourth, (Note: Union of Parishes (Ireland) Act 1827 (7 & 8 Geo. 4. c. 43)) relating to the Union of Parishes in Ireland.
Game (Scotland) Act 1832 (repealed)	2 & 3 Will. 4. c. 68	17 July 1832
An Act for the more effectual Prevention of Trespasses upon Property by Persons in pursuit of Game in that Part of Great Britain called Scotland. (Repealed by Statute Law Revision (No. 2) Act 1888 (51 & 52 Vict. c. 57), Statute Law Revision (No. 2) Act 1890 (53 & 54 Vict. c. 51), Statute Law Revision Act 1891 (54 & 55 Vict. c. 67), Protection of Birds Act 1954 (2 & 3 Eliz. 2. c. 30), Deer (Scotland) Act 1959 (7 & 8 Eliz. 2. c. 40) (Note: Incorrectly cited as "Deer (Scotland) Act 1959 (c. 50)" in the Chronological Table of the Statutes.), Protection of Wild Mammals (Scotland) Act 2002 (asp 6) and Wildlife and Natural Environment (Scotland) Act 2011 (asp 6))
Corporate Property (Elections) Act 1832 (repealed)	2 & 3 Will. 4. c. 69	1 August 1832
An Act to prevent the Application of Corporate Property to the Purposes of Election of Members to serve in Parliament. (Repealed by Representation of the People Act 1949 (12, 13 & 14 Geo. 6. c. 68))
Arms (Ireland) Act 1832 (repealed)	2 & 3 Will. 4. c. 70	1 August 1832
An Act to continue for One Year, and from thence to the End of the then next Session of Parliament, several Acts relating to the Importation and keeping of Arms and Gunpowder in Ireland. (Repealed by Statute Law Revision Act 1874 (37 & 38 Vict. c. 35))
Prescription Act 1832	2 & 3 Will. 4. c. 71	1 August 1832
An Act for shortening the Time of Prescription in certain Cases.
Threshing Machines, Remedies for Damage Act 1832 (repealed)	2 & 3 Will. 4. c. 72	1 August 1832
An Act to extend the Provisions of an Act of the Seventh and Eighth Years of the Reign of His late Majesty King George the Fourth, (Note: Remedies Against the Hundred (England) Act 1827 (7 & 8 Geo. 4. c. 31)) relative to Remedies against the Hundred. (Repealed by Riot (Damages) Act 1886 (49 & 50 Vict. c. 38))
Valuation of Lands (Ireland) Act 1832 (repealed)	2 & 3 Will. 4. c. 73	1 August 1832
An Act to amend Two Acts, of the Seventh Year of the Reign of His late Majesty King George the Fourth, (Note: Valuation of Lands (Ireland) Act 1826 (7 Geo. 4. c. 62)) and in the First and Second Years of the Reign of His present Majesty, (Note: Valuation of Lands (Ireland) Act 1831 (1 & 2 Will. 4. c. 51)) for the uniform Valuation of Lands and Tenements in the several Baronies, Parishes, and other Divisions of Counties in Ireland. (Repealed by Valuation of Lands (Ireland) Act 1836 (6 & 7 Will. 4. c. 84))
Spirits Act 1832 (repealed)	2 & 3 Will. 4. c. 74	1 August 1832
An Act to permit the Distillation of Spirits from Mangel Wurzel. (Repealed by Statute Law Revision Act 1874 (37 & 38 Vict. c. 35))
Anatomy Act 1832 (repealed)	2 & 3 Will. 4. c. 75	1 August 1832
An Act for regulating Schools of Anatomy. (Repealed for England and Wales by Anatomy Act 1984 (c. 14) and for Northern Ireland by Anatomy (Northern Ireland) Order 1992 (SI 1992/1718 (N.I. 11)))
Military Pay Act 1832 (repealed)	2 & 3 Will. 4. c. 76	1 August 1832
An Act to defray the Charge of the Pay, Clothing, and contingent and other Expenses of the Disembodied Militia in Great Britain and Ireland; and to grant Allowances in certain Cases to Subaltern Officers, Adjutants, Paymasters, Quartermasters, Surgeons, Assistant Surgeons, Surgeons Mates, and Serjeant Majors of the Militia, until the First Day of July One thousand eight hundred and thirty-three. (Repealed by Statute Law Revision Act 1874 (37 & 38 Vict. c. 35))
Linen, etc., Manufacturers (Ireland) Act 1832 (repealed)	2 & 3 Will. 4. c. 77	1 August 1832
An Act for the better Regulation of the Linen and Hempen Manufactures of Ireland. (Repealed by Statute Law Revision Act 1874 (37 & 38 Vict. c. 35))
Newfoundland Act 1832	2 & 3 Will. 4. c. 78	1 August 1832
An Act to continue certain Acts relating to the Island of Newfoundland, and to provide for the Appropriation of all Duties which may hereafter be raised within the said Island.
Newfoundland Fisheries Act 1832 (repealed)	2 & 3 Will. 4. c. 79	1 August 1832
An Act to continue, until the Thirty-first Day of December One thousand eight hundred and thirty-four, an Act of the Fifth Year of His late Majesty (Note: Newfoundland Fisheries Act 1824 (5 Geo. 4. c. 51)) relating to the Fisheries in Newfoundland. (Repealed by Statute Law Revision Act 1874 (37 & 38 Vict. c. 35))
Ecclesiastical Corporations Act 1832 (repealed)	2 & 3 Will. 4. c. 80	3 August 1832
An Act to authorize the identifying of Lands and other Possessions of certain Ecclesiastical and Collegiate Corporations. (Repealed by Statute Law (Repeals) Measure 2018 (No. 1))
Russian Dutch Loan Act 1832 (repealed)	2 & 3 Will. 4. c. 81	3 August 1832
An Act to enable His Majesty to carry into effect a Convention made between His said Majesty and the Emperor of all the Russias. (Repealed by Russian Dutch Loan Act 1891 (54 & 55 Vict. c. 26))
Duties on Carriages Act 1832 (repealed)	2 & 3 Will. 4. c. 82	3 August 1832
An Act to reduce the Duties now payable in certain Cases on Carriages with less than Four Wheels. (Repealed by Assessed Taxes (No. 2) Act 1833 (3 & 4 Will. 4. c. 39))
Gaols (Ireland) Act 1832 (repealed)	2 & 3 Will. 4. c. 83	3 August 1832
An Act to authorize for One Year the Removal of Prisoners from the several Gaols in Ireland, in Cases of epidemic Diseases. (Repealed by Statute Law Revision Act 1874 (37 & 38 Vict. c. 35))
Customs Act 1832 (repealed)	2 & 3 Will. 4. c. 84	3 August 1832
An Act to amend the Laws relating to the Customs. (Repealed by Customs (Repeal) Act 1833 (3 & 4 Will. 4. c. 50))
Charities (Ireland) Act 1832 (repealed)	2 & 3 Will. 4. c. 85	3 August 1832
An Act to make a better Provision for the Superintendence of Charitable Institutions in Ireland maintained in the whole or in part by Grand Jury Presentments; and for the more effectual Audit of the Accounts of the same. (Repealed by Local Government (Ireland) Act 1898 (61 & 62 Vict. c. 37))
Post Roads (Ireland) Act 1832 (repealed)	2 & 3 Will. 4. c. 86	3 August 1832
An Act to amend an Act of the Forty-fifth Year of His Majesty King George the Third, (Note: Highways (Ireland) Act 1805 (45 Geo. 3. c. 43)) relating to Post Roads in Ireland. (Repealed by Statute Law Revision Act 1891 (54 & 55 Vict. c. 67))
Registry of Deeds (Ireland) Act 1832 (repealed)	2 & 3 Will. 4. c. 87	4 August 1832
An Act to regulate the Office for registering Deeds, Conveyances, and Wills in Ireland. (Repealed by Statute Law Revision Act 1874 (37 & 38 Vict. c. 35), Statute Law Revision (No. 2) Act 1888 (51 & 52 Vict. c. 57), Statute Law Revision Act 1890 (53 & 54 Vict. c. 33), Statute Law Revision (No. 2) Act 1890 (53 & 54 Vict. c. 51), Statute Law Revision Act 1891 (54 & 55 Vict. c. 67), Statute Law Revision Act (Northern Ireland) 1954 (c. 35 (N.I.)), Registration of Deeds (Amendment) Act (Northern Ireland) 1957 (c. 20 (N.I.)), House of Commons Disqualification Act 1957 (5 & 6 Eliz. 2. c. 20), Registration of Deeds (Amendment) Act (Northern Ireland) 1967 (c. 30 (N.I.)) and Registration of Deeds Act (Northern Ireland) 1970 (c. 25 (N.I.)))
Representation of the People (Ireland) Act 1832 or the Irish Reform Act 1832 (repealed)	2 & 3 Will. 4. c. 88	7 August 1832
An Act to amend the Representation of the People of Ireland. (Repealed for the United Kingdom by Statute Law Revision (No. 2) Act 1888 (51 & 52 Vict. c. 57), Representation of the People Act 1918 (7 & 8 Geo. 5. c. 64) and Statute Law Revision Act 1953 (2 & 3 Eliz. 2. c. 5) and for the Republic of Ireland by Electoral Act 1963 (No. 19))
Parliamentary Boundaries (Ireland) Act 1832 (repealed)	2 & 3 Will. 4. c. 89	7 August 1832
An Act to settle and describe the Limits of Cities, Towns, and Boroughs in Ireland, in so far as respects the Election of Members to serve in Parliament. (Repealed by Statute Law Revision Act 1874 (37 & 38 Vict. c. 35), Statute Law Revision Act 1888 (51 & 52 Vict. c. 3) and Statute Law Revision Act 1950 (14 Geo. 6. c. 6))
Dublin Coal Meters, etc. Act 1832 (repealed)	2 & 3 Will. 4. c. 90	7 August 1832
An Act to authorize the Commissioners of His Majesty's Treasury to grant Compensation to the Inspectors and Coal. (Repealed by Statute Law Revision Act 1874 (37 & 38 Vict. c. 35))
Stamps Act 1832 (repealed)	2 & 3 Will. 4. c. 91	7 August 1832
An Act to explain Doubts that have arisen respecting the Stamp Duty payable by Freemen of Corporation entitled by virtue of Trade and Residence in the Corporate Towns and Counties of Cities and Towns in Ireland. (Repealed by Inland Revenue Repeal Act 1870 (33 & 34 Vict. c. 99))
Privy Council Appeals Act 1832 (repealed)	2 & 3 Will. 4. c. 92	7 August 1832
An Act for transferring the Powers of the High Court of Delegates, both in Ecclesiastical and Maritime Causes, to His Majesty in Council. (Repealed by Ecclesiastical Jurisdiction Measure 1963 (No. 1))
Ecclesiastical Courts (Contempt) Act 1832 (repealed)	2 & 3 Will. 4. c. 93	7 August 1832
An Act for enforcing the Process upon Contempts in the Courts Ecclesiastical of England and Ireland. (Repealed by Ecclesiastical Jurisdiction Measure 1963 (No. 1))
Exchequer Bills Act 1832 (repealed)	2 & 3 Will. 4. c. 94	9 August 1832
An Act for raising the Sum of Thirteen millions eight hundred and ninety-six thousand six hundred Pounds by Exchequer Bills, for the Service of the Year One thousand eight hundred and thirty-two. (Repealed by Statute Law Revision Act 1874 (37 & 38 Vict. c. 35))
Sugar Duties (No. 2) Act 1832 (repealed)	2 & 3 Will. 4. c. 95	9 August 1832
An Act for granting to His Majesty, until the Fifth Day of April One thousand eight hundred and thirty-three, certain Duties on Sugar imported- into the United Kingdom, for the Service of the Year One thousand eight hundred and thirty-two. (Repealed by Statute Law Revision Act 1874 (37 & 38 Vict. c. 35))
Agricultural Labourers Act 1832 (repealed)	2 & 3 Will. 4. c. 96	9 August 1832
An Act for the better Employment of Labourers in Agricultural Parishes until the Twenty-fifth Day of March One thousand eight hundred and thirty-four. (Repealed by Statute Law Revision Act 1874 (37 & 38 Vict. c. 35))
Army Act 1832 (repealed)	2 & 3 Will. 4. c. 97	9 August 1832
An Act to repeal several Acts for enabling the Wives and Families of Soldiers, and the Widows and Families of deceased Soldiers, to return to their Homes. (Repealed by Statute Law Revision Act 1874 (37 & 38 Vict. c. 35))
Bills of Exchange Act 1832 (repealed)	2 & 3 Will. 4. c. 98	9 August 1832
An Act for regulating the protesting for Nonpayment of Bills of Exchange drawn payable at a Place not being the Place of the Residence of the Drawee or Drawees of the same. (Repealed by Bills of Exchange Act 1882 (45 & 46 Vict. c. 61))
Commissioners of Audit Act 1832 (repealed)	2 & 3 Will. 4. c. 99	9 August 1832
An Act for transferring the Powers and Duties of the Commissioners of Public Accounts in Ireland to the Commissioners for auditing the Public Accounts of Great Britain. (Repealed by Exchequer and Audit Departments Act 1866 (29 & 30 Vict. c. 39))
Tithe Act 1832	2 & 3 Will. 4. c. 100	9 August 1832
An Act for shortening the Time required in Claims of Modus decimandi, or Exemption from or Discharge of Tithes.
Sheriff of Selkirkshire Act 1832 (repealed)	2 & 3 Will. 4. c. 101	9 August 1832
An Act to authorize His Majesty to appoint a Person to act as Sheriff of Selkirkshire during the Incapacity of the present Sheriff. (Repealed by Statute Law Revision Act 1874 (37 & 38 Vict. c. 35))
Glass Duties Act 1832 (repealed)	2 & 3 Will. 4. c. 102	10 August 1832
An Act to repeal the Excise Duties on Flint Glass, and to impose other Duties in lieu thereof; and to amend the Laws relating to Glass. (Repealed by Glass Duties Act 1838 (1 & 2 Vict. c. 44))
Customs and Excise Revenues Audit (Scotland) Act 1832 (repealed)	2 & 3 Will. 4. c. 103	11 August 1832
An Act to provide for the Examination and Audit of the Customs and Excise Revenues in Scotland. (Repealed by Inland Revenue Regulation Act 1890 (53 & 54 Vict. c. 21))
Public Accounts Act 1832 (repealed)	2 & 3 Will. 4. c. 104	11 August 1832
An Act to regulate the Period of rendering the Public Accounts and making up the General Imprest Certificates. (Repealed by Exchequer and Audit Departments Act 1866 (29 & 30 Vict. c. 39))
House of Commons (Speaker) Act 1832 (repealed)	2 & 3 Will. 4. c. 105	11 August 1832
An Act for the better Support of the Dignity of the Speaker of the House of Commons; and for disabling the Speaker of the House of Commons for the Time being from holding any Office or Place of Profit, during Pleasure, under the Crown. (Repealed by Ministerial and other Salaries Act 1972 (c. 3))
Officers and Persons on the Compassionate List, etc. Act 1832 (repealed)	2 & 3 Will. 4. c. 106	11 August 1832
An Act to enable the Officers in His Majesty's Army, and their Representatives, and the Widows of Officers, and Persons on the Compassionate List, and also Civil Officers on Retired or Superannuation Allowances payable by the Paymaster General of His Majesty's Forces, to draw for and receive their Half Pay and Allowances. (Repealed by Regulation of the Forces Act 1881 (44 & 45 Vict. c. 57))
Insane Persons (England) Act 1832 (repealed)	2 & 3 Will. 4. c. 107	11 August 1832
An Act for regulating for Three Years, and from thence until the End of the then next Session of Parliament, the Care and Treatment of Insane Persons in England. (Repealed by Lunacy Act 1845 (8 & 9 Vict. c. 100))
Special Constables (Ireland) Act 1832 (repealed)	2 & 3 Will. 4. c. 108	15 August 1832
An Act for amending the Laws in Ireland relative to the Appointment of Special Constables, and for the better Preservation of the Peace. (Repealed by Police Act (Northern Ireland) 1970 (c. 9 (N.I.)))
Annuity to Viscount Canterbury Act 1832 (repealed)	2 & 3 Will. 4. c. 109	15 August 1832
An Act for settling and securing Annuities on the Right Honourable Charles Manners Sutton and on his next Heir Male, in consideration of the eminent Services of the said Right Honourable Charles Manners Sutton. (Repealed by Statute Law Revision Act 1874 (37 & 38 Vict. c. 35))
Court of Exchequer (England) Act 1832 (repealed)	2 & 3 Will. 4. c. 110	15 August 1832
An Act for the better Regulation of the Duties to be performed by the Officers on the Plea or Common Law Side of the Court of Exchequer. (Repealed by Statute Law Revision Act 1874 (37 & 38 Vict. c. 35))
Lord Chancellor's Pension Act 1832 or the Chancery Sinecures Abolition Act 1832 (repealed)	2 & 3 Will. 4. c. 111	15 August 1832
An Act to abolish certain Sinecure Offices connected with the Court of Chancery, and to make Provision for the Lord High Chancellor on his Retirement from Office. (Repealed by Statute Law Revision Act 1874 (37 & 38 Vict. c. 35), Statute Law Revision (No. 2) Act 1888 (51 & 52 Vict. c. 57), Statute Law Revision Act 1890 (53 & 54 Vict. c. 33), Statute Law (Repeals) Act 1981 (c. 19) and Public Service Pensions Act 2013 (c. 25))
Crown Lands (Scotland) Act 1832 (repealed)	2 & 3 Will. 4. c. 112	15 August 1832
An Act to authorize the Hereditary Land Revenues of the Crown in Scotland being placed under the Management of the Commissioners of the Land Revenues. (Repealed by Crown Estate Act 1961 (9 & 10 Eliz. 2. c. 55))
House Tax Act 1832 (repealed)	2 & 3 Will. 4. c. 113	15 August 1832
An Act to continue, until the Fifth Day of April One thousand eight hundred and thirty-four, Compositions for the Assessed Taxes, and to grant Relief in certain Cases. (Repealed by Finance Act 1924 (14 & 15 Geo. 5. c. 21))
Bankruptcy (England) Act 1832 (repealed)	2 & 3 Will. 4. c. 114	15 August 1832
An Act to amend the Laws relating to Bankrupts. (Repealed by Bankruptcy Repeal and Insolvent Court Act 1869 (32 & 33 Vict. c. 83))
Roman Catholic Charities Act 1832 (repealed)	2 & 3 Will. 4. c. 115	15 August 1832
An Act for the better securing the Charitable Donations and Bequests of His Majesty's Subjects in Great Britain professing the Roman Catholic Religion. (Repealed by Statute Law (Repeals) Act 1989 (c. 43))
Lord Lieutenants' and Lord Chancellors' Salaries (Ireland) Act 1832 (repealed)	2 & 3 Will. 4. c. 116	16 August 1832
An Act to provide for the Salaries of certain High and Judicial Officers, and of Payments heretofore made out of the Civil List Revenues. (Repealed by Northern Ireland Act 1955 (3 & 4 Eliz. 2. c. 8))
India, Justices, etc. Act 1832 (repealed)	2 & 3 Will. 4. c. 117	16 August 1832
An Act to amend the Law relating to the Appointment of Justices of the Peace, and of Juries, in the East Indies. (Repealed by Statute Law Revision Act 1874 (37 & 38 Vict. c. 35))
Party Processions (Ireland) Act 1832 (repealed)	2 & 3 Will. 4. c. 118	16 August 1832
An Act to restrain for Five Years, in certain Cases, Party Processions in Ireland. (Repealed by Statute Law Revision Act 1874 (37 & 38 Vict. c. 35))
Composition for Tithes (Ireland) Act 1832 (repealed)	2 & 3 Will. 4. c. 119	16 August 1832
An Act to amend Three Acts passed respectively in the Fourth, (Note: Composition for Tithes (Ireland) Act 1823 (4 Geo. 4. c. 99)) Fifth, (Note: Composition for Tithes (Ireland) Act 1824 (5 Geo. 4. c. 63)) and in the Seventh and Eighth (Note: Compositions for Tithes (Ireland) Act 1827 (7 & 8 Geo. 4. c. 60)) Years of the Reign of His late Majesty King George the Fourth, providing for the establishing of Compositions for Tithes in Ireland; and to make such Compositions permanent. (Repealed by Statute Law Revision Act 1874 (37 & 38 Vict. c. 35))
Stage Carriages Act 1832 (repealed)	2 & 3 Will. 4. c. 120	16 August 1832
An Act to repeal the Duties under the Management of the Commissioners of Stamps on Stage Carriages and on Horses let for Hire in Great Britain, and to grant other Duties in lieu thereof; and also to consolidate and amend the Laws relating thereto. (Repealed by Statute Law (Repeals) Act 1981 (c. 19) and County of Lancashire Act 1984 (c. xxi))
Greek Loan Guarantee Act 1832 (repealed)	2 & 3 Will. 4. c. 121	16 August 1832
An Act to enable His Majesty to carry into effect a Convention made between His Majesty and the King of the French and Emperor of all the Russian, and the King of Bavaria. (Repealed by Statute Law Revision Act 1874 (37 & 38 Vict. c. 35))
Lord Chancellor's Salary Act 1832 (repealed)	2 & 3 Will. 4. c. 122	16 August 1832
An Act for making Provision for the Lord High Chancellor of England in lieu of Fees heretofore received by him. (Repealed by Statute Law Revision Act 1874 (37 & 38 Vict. c. 35))
Forgery, Abolition of Punishment of Death Act 1832 (repealed)	2 & 3 Will. 4. c. 123	16 August 1832
An Act for abolishing the Punishment of Death in certain Cases of Forgery. (Repealed by Statute Law Revision Act 1891 (54 & 55 Vict. c. 67))
Turnpikes Act 1832 (repealed)	2 & 3 Will. 4. c. 124	16 August 1832
An Act to explain certain Provisions in Local Acts of Parliament relating to Double Toll on Turnpike Roads. (Repealed by Statute Law (Repeals) Act 1981 (c. 19))
Loans for Jamaica, Trinidad, etc. Act 1832 (repealed)	2 & 3 Will. 4. c. 125	16 August 1832
An Act for enabling His Majesty to direct the Issue of Exchequer Bills to a limited Amount, for the Purposes and in the Manner therein mentioned; and for giving Relief to Trinidad, British Guiana, and St. Lucie. (Repealed by West India Loan Act 1879 (42 & 43 Vict. c. 16))
Appropriation Act 1832 (repealed)	2 & 3 Will. 4. c. 126	16 August 1832
An Act to apply a Sum out of the Consolidated Fund, and the Surplus of Ways and Means, to the Service of the Year One thousand eight hundred and thirty-two, and to appropriate the Supplies granted in this Session of Parliament. (Repealed by Statute Law Revision Act 1874 (37 & 38 Vict. c. 35))
Land Tax Commissioners (Appointment) Act 1832 (repealed)	2 & 3 Will. 4. c. 127	16 August 1832
An Act for appointing additional Commissioners to put in execution the Acts for granting an Aid to His Majesty by a Land Tax, and continuing the Duties on Personal Estates, Offices, and Pensions. (Repealed by Statute Law Revision Act 1950 (14 Geo. 6. c. 6))

=== Local acts ===
Short title	Citation	Royal assent
Long title
Liverpool Marine Assurance Company Act 1832	2 & 3 Will. 4. c. i	20 February 1832
An Act for enabling the Liverpool Marine Assurance Company to sue and be sued in the Name of the Chairman for the Time being, or of any One of the Directors of the said Company.
Norwich and Lowestoft Navigation Act 1832	2 & 3 Will. 4. c. ii	20 February 1832
An Act to enlarge the Term and amend the Powers and Provisions of an Act passed in the Seventh and Eighth Years of His late Majesty King George the Fourth, (Note: Norwich and Lowestoft Navigation Act 1827 (7 & 8 Geo. 4. c. xlii)) for making a navigable Communication between the City of Norwich and the Sea, at or near Lowestoft in the County of Suffolk.
Ashford and Buxton, Tideswell and Blackwell, and Edensor and Ashford Turnpike Roads (Derbyshire) Act 1832	2 & 3 Will. 4. c. iii	20 February 1832
An Act for maintaining and improving the Turnpike Roads leading from Ashford to Buxton, and from Tideswell to Blackwell, and from Edensor to Ashford, all in the County of Derby.
Road from Hardingston to Old Stratford (Northamptonshire) Act 1832 (repealed)	2 & 3 Will. 4. c. iv	20 February 1832
An Act for more effectually repairing and improving the Road from Hardingston to Old Stratford in the County of Northampton. (Repealed by Statute Law (Repeals) Act 2013 (c. 2))
Road from Ipswich to Stratford St. Mary Act 1832 (repealed)	2 & 3 Will. 4. c. v	20 February 1832
An Act for more effectually repairing and otherwise improving the Road from Ipswich to Stratford Saint Mary in the County of Suffolk. (Repealed by Statute Law (Repeals) Act 2008 (c. 12))
Birmingham and Wednesbury Roads Act 1832	2 & 3 Will. 4. c. vi	20 February 1832
An Act for more effectually maintaining and improving the Roads from Birmingham to Wednesbury and to Great Bridge, and from thence to the Portway adjoining the Bilston and Wednesbury Turnpike Road, and to Nether Trindle near Dudley, and from Trouse Lane in the Parish of Wednesbury to Darlaston, in the Counties of Warwick, Stafford, and Worcester; and for making new Branches of Road communicating therewith.
Saltash Floating Bridge Act 1832	2 & 3 Will. 4. c. vii	24 March 1832
An Act for establishing a Floating Bridge over the River Tamar at or near Saltash Ferry in the County of Cornwall.
Walton-on-the-Hill Market Act 1832 (repealed)	2 & 3 Will. 4. c. viii	24 March 1832
An Act for establishing a Market in the Parish of Walton-on-the-Hill in the County Palatine of Lancaster. (Repealed by Liverpool Corporation Act 1921 (11 & 12 Geo. 5. c. lxxiv))
Sutton Pool Harbour Act 1832 (repealed)	2 & 3 Will. 4. c. ix	24 March 1832
An Act to continue the Term and to alter and amend the Powers of an Act passed in the Fifty-first Year of the Reign of His Majesty King George the Third, (Note: Sutton Pool Harbour (Plymouth) Act 1811 (51 Geo. 3. c. cxcvi)) for the Improvement of the Harbour of Sutton Pool in the Port of Plymouth in the County of Devon. (Repealed by Sutton Harbour Act 1847 (10 & 11 Vict. c. ccxcvii))
Leicester Rates and Poor Relief Act 1832 (repealed)	2 & 3 Will. 4. c. x	24 March 1832
An Act for better assessing and collecting the Poor and other Parochial Rates, and for the better Maintenance and Employment of the Poor of the Parish of Saint Margaret in the Borough and County of Leicester. (Repealed by Statute Law (Repeals) Act 2013 (c. 2))
Paisley Gas Act 1832 (repealed)	2 & 3 Will. 4. c. xi	24 March 1832
An Act to amend an Act for lighting the Town and Burgh of Paisley, and Suburbs and Places adjacent, with Gas; and to enable the Company thereby incorporated to increase their Capital Stock; and for other Purposes relating thereto. (Repealed by Paisley Gaslight Act 1845 (8 & 9 Vict. c. xviii))
St. Helens Gas Act 1832 (repealed)	2 & 3 Will. 4. c. xii	24 March 1832
An Act for lighting with Gas the Town of Saint Helens, the Hamlet of Hardshaw-cum-Windle, and the several Townships of Windle, Parr, Eccleston, and Sutton, all in the Parish of Prescot in the County Palatine of Lancaster. (Repealed by St. Helens Gas Act 1852 (15 & 16 Vict. c. lxix))
St. Luke's Parish, Middlesex Improvement Act 1832 (repealed)	2 & 3 Will. 4. c. xiii	24 March 1832
An Act to alter and enlarge the Powers of an Act of the Fiftieth Year of His Majesty King George the Third, (Note: St. Luke's Parish, Middlesex, Improvement Act 1810 (50 Geo. 3. c. cxlix)) for lighting and otherwise improving the Streets and other public Places in the Parish of Saint Luke in the County of Middlesex; and for placing under the Care of the Trustees certain Roads in the Parish which were lately Turnpike Roads. (Repealed by London Government (Borough of Finsbury) Order in Council 1901 (SR&O 1901/266))
Newport (Monmouthshire) District Turnpike Roads Act 1832 (repealed)	2 & 3 Will. 4. c. xiv	24 March 1832
An Act for diverting, altering, repairing, maintaining, and improving the several Turnpike Roads within the District of Newport in the County of Monmouth. (Repealed by Newport (Monmouthshire) Roads Act 1864 (27 & 28 Vict. c. liii))
Road from Brough Ferry and from Brough to Welton Act 1832 (repealed)	2 & 3 Will. 4. c. xv	24 March 1832
An Act for repairing and otherwise improving the Road from Brough Ferry to South Newbald Holmes, and from Brough to Welton, in the East Riding of the County of York. (Repealed by Brough Ferry Road Act 1864 (27 & 28 Vict. c. lix))
Burford and Banbury, Burford and Stow, and Swerford Gate and Aynho Roads Act 1832 (repealed)	2 & 3 Will. 4. c. xvi	24 March 1832
An Act for more effectually improving the Road from Burford to Banbury in the County of Oxford, and from Burford to the Road leading to Stow in the County of Gloucester, and from Swerford Gate in the County of Oxford to the Road in Aynho in the County of Northampton; and for making a new Branch of Road to communicate with the same. (Repealed by Annual Turnpike Acts Continuance Act 1872 (35 & 36 Vict. c. 85))
New Windsor and Twyford Road Act 1832	2 & 3 Will. 4. c. xvii	24 March 1832
An Act for making and maintaining a Road from New Windsor in the County of Berks to the Village of Twyford in the Parish of Hurst in the said County and County of Wilts.
Bedford and Newport Pagnell Road to Olney Act 1832	2 & 3 Will. 4. c. xviii	24 March 1832
An Act for repairing the Road leading out of the Bedford and Newport Pagnell Turnpike Road near Bromham Grange in the County of Bedford to Olney and other Places in the County of Buckingham.
Mytholmroyd Bridge and Rochdale Turnpike Road Act 1832 (repealed)	2 & 3 Will. 4. c. xix	24 March 1832
An Act for improving and maintaining the Road from or near Mytholm Boyd Bridge, in the West Riding of the County of York, communicating with the Road at or near to the Sixth Mile Stone from Rochdale in the County of Lancaster. (Repealed by Mytholmroyd Bridge and Blackstone Edge Turnpike Road Act 1864 (27 & 28 Vict. c. civ))
Road from Doncaster to Bawtry Act 1832	2 & 3 Will. 4. c. xx	24 March 1832
An Act for more effectually repairing and otherwise improving the Road from Doncaster to Bawtry in the County of York.
Downham Market, Barton and Devil's Ditch Road Act 1832 (repealed)	2 & 3 Will. 4. c. xxi	24 March 1832
An Act for more effectually repairing the Road from Downham Market to Barton, and to a Place called the Devil's Ditch, all in the County of Norfolk. (Repealed by Statute Law (Repeals) Act 2008 (c. 12))
Boroughbridge and Durham Road Act 1832	2 & 3 Will. 4. c. xxii	24 March 1832
An Act for more effectually repairing the Road leading from Boroughbridge in the County of York to the City of Durham, and for making and maintaining certain Deviations therein.
London Bridge Approaches Act 1832	2 & 3 Will. 4. c. xxiii	3 April 1832
An Act to amend several Acts relating to London Bridge and the Approaches thereto.
Turton and Entwistle Reservoir Act 1832	2 & 3 Will. 4. c. xxiv	3 April 1832
An Act for making and maintaining a Reservoir upon Bradshaw Brook in the Townships of Turton and Entwisle in the Parish of Bolton-le-Moors in the County of Lancaster, for providing a more regular Supply of Water in Bradshaw Brook aforesaid, and in certain Rivers connected therewith.
Clarence Railway Act 1832	2 & 3 Will. 4. c. xxv	3 April 1832
An Act to alter, amend, enlarge, and extend the Powers of several Acts passed in the Ninth (Note: Clarence Railway Act 1828 (9 Geo. 4. c. lxi)) and Tenth (Note: Clarence Railway Act 1829 (10 Geo. 4. c. cvi)) Years of the Reign of His late Majesty King George the Fourth for making and maintaining the Clarence Railway.
St. Mary Islington and Stone Fields Estate Act 1832	2 & 3 Will. 4. c. xxvi	3 April 1832
An Act to equalize the Ecclesiastical Burthens of the Parish of Saint Mary Islington in the County of Middlesex; for partially altering the Application of the Rents and Profits of the Stone Fields Estate within the said Parish; for letting the Pews in the Parish Church of Saint Mary Islington, and the Chapel of Ease thereto; and for other Purposes connected therewith.
Preston and Fishwick Water Act 1832	2 & 3 Will. 4. c. xxvii	3 April 1832
An Act for better supplying with Water the Borough of Preston, and Part of the Township of Fishwick adjoining thereto, in the Parish of Preston in the County Palatine of Lancaster.
Road from Barton Bridge to the Manchester and Altrincham Road Act 1832	2 & 3 Will. 4. c. xxviii	3 April 1832
An Act for more effectually repairing and improving the Roads leading from Barton Bridge into the Manchester and Altrincham Turnpike Road in the County oi Lancaster.
Cockermouth and Workington Road Act 1832	2 & 3 Will. 4. c. xxix	3 April 1832
An Act for more effectually repairing and improving the Road from the Town of Cockermouth to the Town of Workington, and a Branch of Road over Broughton High Bridge, unto and as far as the public Highway leading from the Village of Papcastle, towards and unto the Village of Great Broughton the County of Cumberland.
Odiham and Farnham Road Act 1832 (repealed)	2 & 3 Will. 4. c. xxx	3 April 1832
An Act for more effectually repairing and improving the Road from Odiham in the County of Southampton to Farnham in the County of Surrey. (Repealed by Annual Turnpike Acts Continuance Act 1871 (34 & 35 Vict. c. 115))
Berwick-upon-Tweed and Dunglas Bridge Road Act 1832	2 & 3 Will. 4. c. xxxi	3 April 1832
An Act for more effectually repairing the Road leading from Berwick-upon-Tweed, by Ayton Bridge and Ayton, to Dunglas Bridge, and the Road from Billie Causeway and Preston Bridge to join the said Road at or near Houndwood House and Bankhouse respectively, in the County of Berwick.
Road from Mansfield to the Nottingham Turnpike Road Act 1832	2 & 3 Will. 4. c. xxxii	3 April 1832
An Act for more effectually repairing and improving the Road leading from the Alfreton Turnpike Road near Mansfield, through Tibshelf and Morton, to the Nottingham Turnpike Road near Tansley, and other Roads connected therewith, in the Counties of Nottingham and Derby.
Birmingham and Stonebridge Road Act 1832	2 & 3 Will. 4. c. xxxiii	3 April 1832
An Act for repairing the Road from Birmingham (through Elmdon) to Stonebridge in the County of Warwick.
Buckingham to Hanwell (Oxfordshire) Road Act 1832 (repealed)	2 & 3 Will. 4. c. xxxiv	3 April 1832
An Act for more effectually repairing the Road from the Sessions House in the Town of Buckingham to Hanwell in the County of Oxford. (Repealed by Statute Law (Repeals) Act 2013 (c. 2))
Belfast and Cavehill Railway Act 1832	2 & 3 Will. 4. c. xxxv	9 April 1832
An Act for making and maintaining a Railway from the Cavehill to the Harbour of Belfast in the County of Antrim.
Manchester Improvement Act 1832 (repealed)	2 & 3 Will. 4. c. xxxvi	9 April 1832
An Act for widening and improving a Part of London Road in the Parish of Manchester and County of Lancaster, and also for effecting Improvements in the Streets and other Places within the Town of Manchester. (Repealed by Manchester General Improvement Act 1851 (14 & 15 Vict. c. cxix))
Wells (Somerset) Gas Act 1832 (repealed)	2 & 3 Will. 4. c. xxxvii	9 April 1832
An Act for lighting with Gas the City or Borough of Wells in the County of Somerset, the Liberty of Saint Andrew, and Suburbs of the said City or Borough. (Repealed by Wells Gas Act 1867 (30 & 31 Vict. c. xlviii))
British Commercial Insurance Company Act 1832 (repealed)	2 & 3 Will. 4. c. xxxviii	9 April 1832
An Act to enable the British Commercial Insurance Company to sue and be sued in the Name of One of the Directors or of the Secretary for the Time being of the Company. (Repealed by British Commercial Insurance Company Act 1847 (10 & 11 Vict. c. lxxxiv))
Bristol Asylum or School of Industry for the Blind Act 1832 (repealed)	2 & 3 Will. 4. c. xxxix	23 May 1832
An Act for better governing and regulating an Institution in the City of Bristol called and known by the Name of "The Bristol Asylum or School of Industry for the Blind." (Repealed by Statute Law (Repeals) Act 2013 (c. 2))
Upton-upon-Severn Markets Act 1832 (repealed)	2 & 3 Will. 4. c. xl	23 May 1832
An Act for providing a Town Hall and Market Place, and regulating the Markets, in the Town of Upton-upon-Severn in the County of Worcester. (Repealed by Upton Town Hall Act 1908 (8 Edw. 7. c. xlv))
Chester Dee Bridge Act 1832	2 & 3 Will. 4. c. xli	23 May 1832
An Act for extending the Time for completing the additional Bridge over the River Dee in the City of Chester.
Spey and Findhorn Bridges Act 1832	2 & 3 Will. 4. c. xlii	23 May 1832
An Act to alter and amend an Act passed in the Eleventh Year of the Reign of His late Majesty King George the Fourth, (Note: Spey and Findhorn Bridges Act 1830 (11 Geo. 4 & 1 Will. 4. c. cxxix)) for rebuilding the Bridges over the Rivers Spey and Findhorn, for making Accesses thereto, and for making and maintaining certain new Roads in the County of Elgin, in so far as the same regards the Bridge over the River Spey near Fochabers in the said County of Elgin.
Bridgwater and Taunton Canal Navigation Act 1832	2 & 3 Will. 4. c. xliii	23 May 1832
An Act to explain and amend Two Acts, of the Fifty-first Year of His late Majesty King George the Third (Note: Bristol and Taunton Canal Navigation Act 1811 (51 Geo. 3. c. lx)) and the Fifth Year of His late Majesty King George the Fourth, (Note: Bristol and Taunton Canal Navigation Act 1824 (5 Geo. 4. c. cxx)) relative to the Bridgewater and Taunton Canal Navigation.
Largs Harbour (Ayrshire) Act 1832	2 & 3 Will. 4. c. xliv	23 May 1832
An Act for constructing and maintaining a Pier or Harbour at Largs in the County of Ayr.
St. Leonards Improvement Act 1832	2 & 3 Will. 4. c. xlv	23 May 1832
An Act for better paving, lighting, watching, and otherwise improving the Town of Saint Leonard in the County of Sussex.
Liverpool and Manchester Railway Act 1832 (repealed)	2 & 3 Will. 4. c. xlvi	23 May 1832
An Act for enabling the Liverpool and Manchester Railway Company to make a Branch Railway, and for amending and enlarging the Powers and Provisions of the several Acts relating to such Railway. (Repealed by Grand Junction Railway Act 1845 (8 & 9 Vict. c. cxcviii))
Bodmin and Wadebridge Railway Act 1832	2 & 3 Will. 4. c. xlvii	23 May 1832
An Act for making and maintaining a Railway from Wadebridge in the Parish of Saint Breoke to Wenford Bridge, Saint Breward, with a collateral Branch to the Borough of Bodmin, and certain other Branches, all in the County of Cornwall.
Festiniog Railway Act 1832	2 & 3 Will. 4. c. xlviii	23 May 1832
An Act for making and maintaining a Railway or Tramroad from a certain Quay at Portmadock, in the Parish of Yngs-cynhaiarn in the County of Carnarvon, to certain Slate Quarries called Rhiw-bryfder and Dyffws, in the Parish of Festiniog in the County of Merioneth.
St. Katharine Docks Act 1832 (repealed)	2 & 3 Will. 4. c. xlix	23 May 1832
An Act to alter, amend, and enlarge the Powers of several Acts for making and maintaining the Saint Katharine Docks in the County of Middlesex. (Repealed by London and St. Katharine Docks Act 1864 (27 & 28 Vict. c. clxxviii))
Holderness Drainage Act 1832	2 & 3 Will. 4. c. l	23 May 1832
An Act to alter and enlarge the Powers of Two Acts passed in the Fourth (Note: Holderness Drainage Act 1764 (4 Geo. 3. c. 47 Pr.)) and Sixth (Note: Holderness Drainage Act 1766 (6 Geo. 3. c. 74 Pr.)) Years of the Reign of His Majesty King George the Third, for draining and improving certain Low Grounds and Cars in Holderness in the East Riding of the County of York.
Tamworth Roads Act 1832	2 & 3 Will. 4. c. li	23 May 1832
An Act for maintaining several Roads leading to and from the Town of Tamworth in the Counties of Stafford and Warwick.
Lympstone and Exmouth Turnpike Road Act 1832	2 & 3 Will. 4. c. lii	23 May 1832
An Act for making and maintaining a Turnpike Road from Burnt House in the Parish of Lympstone in the County of Devon to Exmouth in the same County.
Little Yarmouth and Blythburgh, and Brampton and Halesworth Roads Act 1832 (repealed)	2 & 3 Will. 4. c. liii	23 May 1832
An Act for more effectually repairing the Road from Little Yarmouth to Blythburgh, and from Brampton to Halesworth, in the County of Suffolk. (Repealed by Statute Law (Repeals) Act 2008 (c. 12))
Robeston Wathan and St. Clears Road and Branches (Pembroke and Carmarthen) Act 1832 (repealed)	2 & 3 Will. 4. c. liv	23 May 1832
An Act for better maintaining the Road leading from Robeston Wathan to Saint Clears, and other Roads, in the Counties of Pembroke and Carmarthen, and for making several Branches from such Roads. (Repealed by Turnpike Trusts in South Wales Act 1844 (7 & 8 Vict. c. 91))
Road from Newcastle-under-Lyme to Market Drayton Act 1832	2 & 3 Will. 4. c. lv	23 May 1832
An Act for more effectually repairing and improving the Road from Newcastle-under-Lyme in the County of Stafford to Drayton in Hales otherwise Market Drayton in the County of Salop, and for making new Branches and Deviations of Roads to communicate therewith.
Roads and Bridges in Berwick (County) Act 1832	2 & 3 Will. 4. c. lvi	23 May 1832
An Act for more effectually repairing, amending, and maintaining certain Roads and Bridges in the County of Berwick.
Road from Vinehall to Taylor's Corner (Sussex) Act 1832	2 & 3 Will. 4. c. lvii	23 May 1832
An Act for more effectually repairing and widening the Road from the Turnpike Road at Vinehall to Cripps's Corner, and from thence to Staplecross, and from Cripps's Comer to Taylor's Corner, in the County of Sussex, and a Piece of Road communicating therewith.
Road from Billingshurst to Broadbridge Heath Act 1832	2 & 3 Will. 4. c. lviii	23 May 1832
An Act for more effectually repairing and maintaining the Turnpike Road from or near a Place called The Five Oaks, in the Parish of Billingshurst, to join the Horsham and Guildford Turnpike Road on Broadbridge Heath in the County of Sussex.
Shankhill (County Kilkenny) and Waterford Road Act 1832 (repealed)	2 & 3 Will. 4. c. lix	23 May 1832
An Act for more effectually repairing the Road leading from Shankhill in the County of Kilkenny to the City of Waterford. (Repealed by Turnpike Trusts Abolition (Ireland) Act 1857 (20 & 21 Vict. c. 16))
Conway and Pwllheli Road Act 1832	2 & 3 Will. 4. c. lx	23 May 1832
An Act for more effectually repairing and improving the Road from Conway to Pwllheli, and other Roads therein mentioned, in the Counties of Carnarvon and Denbigh.
Bishop Wearmouth and Norton (Durham) Road Act 1832	2 & 3 Will. 4. c. lxi	23 May 1832
An Act for more effectually repairing and improving the Road from Bishop Wearmouth to Norton in the County of Durham.
Ightham and London to Maidstone Road Act 1832	2 & 3 Will. 4. c. lxii	23 May 1832
An Act for more effectually repairing the Road from Ightham in the County of Kent to the Turnpike Road leading from London to Maidstone in the said County.
Norwich and Fakenham Road Act 1832 (repealed)	2 & 3 Will. 4. c. lxiii	23 May 1832
An Act for more effectually repairing the Road from the City of Norwich to Fakenham in the County of Norfolk. (Repealed by Statute Law (Repeals) Act 2008 (c. 12))
Cann St. Rumbold and Brook Turnpike Road (Dorset, Hampshire) Act 1832	2 & 3 Will. 4. c. lxiv	23 May 1832
An Act for making a Turnpike Road from the Parish of Cann Saint Bumbold, near Shaftesbury in the County of Dorset, through Cranbourne Chase and the New Forest, to the Bell Inn at Brook in the Parish of Bramshaw in the County of Southampton, together with Two Branches therefrom.
Tower Hamlets Court of Requests Act 1832 (repealed)	2 & 3 Will. 4. c. lxv	1 June 1832
An Act to amend and render more effectual certain Acts of the Twenty-third Year (Note: Small Debts (Tower Hamlets) Act 1749 (23 Geo. 2. c. 30)) of the Reign of His Majesty King George the Second and the Nineteenth Year of His Majesty King George the Third, (Note: Small Debts (Tower Hamlets) Act 1779 (19 Geo. 3. c. 68)) for the more speedy Recovery of Small Debts within the Tower Hamlets. (Repealed by County Courts Act 1846 (9 & 10 Vict. c. 95))
United Parishes of St. Andrew Holborn above the Bars and St. George the Martyr Improvement Act 1832 (repealed)	2 & 3 Will. 4. c. lxvi	1 June 1832
An Act for the better Regulation and Improvement of the United Parishes of Saint Andrew Holborn above the Bars and Saint George the Martyr in the County of Middlesex. (Repealed by London Government (Borough of Holborn) Order in Council 1901 (SR&O 1901/269))
Hartlepool Dock and Railway Act 1832	2 & 3 Will. 4. c. lxvii	1 June 1832
An Act for making and maintaining Wet Docks in the Port of Hartlepool, and a Railway from the said Docks into the Township of Moorsley, with certain Branches therefrom, all in the County of Durham.
Hartlepool Pier and Port Act 1832 (repealed)	2 & 3 Will. 4. c. lxviii	1 June 1832
An Act for amending and rendering more effectual an Act of King George the Third, (Note: Hartlepool Pier and Port Act 1813 (53 Geo. 3. c. xxxv)) for improving the Pier and Port of Hartlepool in the County of Durham. (Repealed by Hartlepool Pier and Port Act 1851 (14 & 15 Vict. c. cxvii))
Manchester, Bolton and Bury Canal and Railway Act 1832	2 & 3 Will. 4. c. lxix	1 June 1832
An Act to enable the Company of Proprietors of the Manchester, Bolton, and Bury Canal Navigation and Railway to alter some Parts of the said Canal Navigation, to alter and amend the Line of the said Railway, to make further collateral Branches thereto; and for amending the Powers and Provisions of the Act (Note: Manchester, Bolton and Bury Canal and Railway Act 1831 (1 & 2 Will. 4. c. lx)) relating to the said Canal and Railway.
Ruskington, Dorrington and North Kyme Inclosure and Drainage Act 1832	2 & 3 Will. 4. c. lxx	1 June 1832
An Act for inclosing, draining, and embanking Lands within the Parishes of Ruskington and Dorrington, and the Township or Hamlet of North Kyme in the Parish of South Kyme, all in the County of Lincoln.
Lichfield Turnpike Roads (Warwickshire, Staffordshire) Act 1832	2 & 3 Will. 4. c. lxxi	1 June 1832
An Act for more effectually repairing the First District of the Road from Coleshill, through the City of Lichfield and the Town of Stone, to the End of the County of Stafford in the Road leading towards Chester, and several other Roads in the Counties of Warwick and Stafford and City and County of the City of Lichfield.
Road from Ternhill to Newport (Salop.) Act 1832	2 & 3 Will. 4. c. lxxii	1 June 1832
An Act for repairing and improving the Road from Ternhill to Newport in the County of Salop.
Bawtry and Selby Road Act 1832	2 & 3 Will. 4. c. lxxiii	1 June 1832
An Act for more effectually repairing, improving, and maintaining the Road from Bawtry to Selby in the West Riding of the County of York.
Roads to and through Goudhurst Act 1832	2 & 3 Will. 4. c. lxxiv	1 June 1832
An Act for more effectually repairing and improving certain Roads leading to and through the Town of Goudhurst in the County of Kent.
Shawbury District of Roads (Salop.) Act 1832	2 & 3 Will. 4. c. lxxv	1 June 1832
An Act for better maintaining certain Roads within the County of Salop called "The Shawbury District of Roads."
Stevenage, Biggleswade and Arsley Road Act 1832	2 & 3 Will. 4. c. lxxvi	1 June 1832
An Act for repairing, maintaining, and improving the Road from Stevenage in the County of Hertford to Biggleswade in the County of Bedford, and a Branch therefrom to Arlsey in the said County at Bedford.
Lanfabon and Pontymoil Road Act 1832 (repealed)	2 & 3 Will. 4. c. lxxvii	1 June 1832
An Act for more effectually repairing and maintaining the Road from Lanfabon to Pontymoil, and other Roads and Bridges therein mentioned, in the Counties of Glamorgan and Monmouth. (Repealed by Abercarn Turnpike Roads Act 1866 (29 & 30 Vict. c. cxii))
Haddington County Offices Act 1832	2 & 3 Will. 4. c. lxxviii	6 June 1832
An Act for erecting and maintaining within the Burgh of Haddington a new Court House, Record Rooms, and other Offices, for the County of Haddington.
Church of St. Mary, Birkenhead Act 1832	2 & 3 Will. 4. c. lxxix	6 June 1832
An Act for enlarging the Church of Saint Mary in the Chapelry of Birkenhead in the County Palatine of Chester.
Parish Church of St. Bartholomew, Chichester Act 1832	2 & 3 Will. 4. c. lxxx	6 June 1832
An Act for establishing as the Parish Church the newly-erected Church in the Parish of Saint Bartholomew adjoining the City of Chichester.
Standard Life Assurance Company Act 1832 (repealed)	2 & 3 Will. 4. c. lxxxi	6 June 1832
An Act to enable the Standard Life Assurance Company to sue and be sued in the Name of their Manager; for confirming the Rules and Regulations of the said Company; and for other Purposes relating thereto. (Repealed by Standard Life Assurance Company Act 1910 (10 Edw. 7 & 1 Geo. 5. c. x))
Perth, Stirling and Forfar Roads and Bridges Act 1832	2 & 3 Will. 4. c. lxxxii	6 June 1832
An Act for more effectually making, maintaining, and repairing certain Roads, with the necessary Bridges thereon, in the Counties of Perth, Stirling, and Forfar.
Stoke Ferry Roads (Norfolk) Act 1832 (repealed)	2 & 3 Will. 4. c. lxxxiii	6 June 1832
An Act for more effectually repairing several Roads leading from the Bell in Stoke Ferry (Note: The Blue Bell Inn (originally "The Bell"), Lynn Road, Stoke Ferry; it has existed since the late 1700s. 52°34′24″N 0°30′37″E) in the County of Norfolk. (Repealed by Annual Turnpike Acts Continuance Act 1870 (33 & 34 Vict. c. 73))
Dudley and Brettell Lane District of Roads Act 1832	2 & 3 Will. 4. c. lxxxiv	6 June 1832
An Act for maintaining and improving certain Roads within the Counties of Worcester and Stafford called "The Dudley and Brettell Lane District of Roads," and for making several Branches from such Roads.
Dudley and New Inn District of Roads Act 1832	2 & 3 Will. 4. c. lxxxv	6 June 1832
An Act for improving certain Roads within the Counties of Worcester, Salop, and Stafford, called "The Dudley and New Inn District of Roads."
Road from Doncaster to Selby Act 1832	2 & 3 Will. 4. c. lxxxvi	6 June 1832
An Act for making and maintaining a Turnpike Road from the Town of Doncaster to the Town and Port of Selby in the West Riding of the County of York.
Edinburgh Police Act 1832 (repealed)	2 & 3 Will. 4. c. lxxxvii	23 June 1832
An Act for altering and amending certain Acts for regulating the Police of the City of Edinburgh and the adjoining Districts; and for other Purposes relating thereto. (Repealed by Edinburgh Municipal and Police Act 1879 (42 & 43 Vict. c. cxxxii))
Bristol Riots Act 1832	2 & 3 Will. 4. c. lxxxviii	23 June 1832
An Act for more easily providing Compensation for the Damage and Injury committed within the City of Bristol and County of the same City during the late Riots and Disturbances therein.
United Parishes of St. James and St. Paul in the County of Gloucester, Improvement and Poor Relief Act 1832	2 & 3 Will. 4. c. lxxxix	23 June 1832
An Act for repairing, lighting, and watching the District of the United Parishes of Saint James and Saint Paul in the County of Gloucester; and for the Care of the Poor thereof.
Chorlton-upon-Medlock Improvement Act 1832 (repealed)	2 & 3 Will. 4. c. xc	23 June 1832
An Act for improving and regulating the Township of Chorlton-upon-Medlock in the County of Lancaster. (Repealed by Manchester General Improvement Act 1851 (14 & 15 Vict. c. cxix))
Hastings Improvement Act 1832 (repealed)	2 & 3 Will. 4. c. xci	23 June 1832
An Act for paving, lighting, watching, cleansing, and improving the Town and Port of Hastings in the County of Sussex, and for establishing and regulating Markets therein, and supplying the Inhabitants thereof with Water; and for other Purposes. (Repealed by East Sussex Act 1981 (c. xxv))
Newcastle-upon-Tyne and Carlisle Railway Act 1832	2 & 3 Will. 4. c. xcii	23 June 1832
An Act to accelerate the raising by the Newcastle upon Tyne and Carlisle Railway Company of a certain Sum for the more speedy Prosecution of the Undertaking.
Exeter and Crediton Railway Act 1832	2 & 3 Will. 4. c. xciii	23 June 1832
An Act for making and maintaining a Railway from the Basin of the Exeter Canal in the Parish of Saint Thomas the Apostle in the County of Devon to the Four Mills in the Parish of Crediton in the said County.
Lincolnshire Fens and Dales Drainage Act 1832	2 & 3 Will. 4. c. xciv	23 June 1832
An Act for the more effectual Drainage of the Lands within Blankney Fen, Blankney Dales, Linwood Fen, Linwood Dales, and Martin Fen and Martin Dales, in the County of Lincoln.
Blue Gowt Drain Act 1832	2 & 3 Will. 4. c. xcv	23 June 1832
An Act for the better Drainage of certain Lands in the Parishes of Spalding and Pinchbeck in the County of Lincoln, the Waters from which are discharged by the Blue Gowt Drain.
Nocton, Potterhanworth and Branston Drainage Act 1832	2 & 3 Will. 4. c. xcvi	23 June 1832
An Act for repealing Parts of and amending and enlarging the Powers of other Parts of an Act (Note: Lincoln (Drainage) Act 1789 (29 Geo. 3. c. 32)) for embanking and draining certain Fens and Low Lands in the Parishes of Nocton and Potterhanworth in the County of Lincoln, and in the Parish of Branston in the County of the City of Lincoln.
Marlborough District of Roads Act 1832	2 & 3 Will. 4. c. xcvii	23 June 1832
An Act for more effectually repairing and amending the Marlborough District of the Road from Swindon to Marlborough and from Marlborough to Everly in the County of Wilts, and also the Branch Road from the same to the present Turnpike Road from Andover to Devizes; and for making a Road from the said Branch Road at Collingburn Ducis to join the present Turnpike Road from Andover to Salisbury in the said County.
Warwick and Northampton Road Act 1832	2 & 3 Will. 4. c. xcviii	23 June 1832
An Act for repairing and improving the Road from the Great Bridge in the Borough of Warwick, through Southam and Daventry, to the Town of Northampton.
Road from Prestwich to Bury and Ratcliffe Act 1832 (repealed)	2 & 3 Will. 4. c. xcix	23 June 1832
An Act for repairing and improving the Roads from Prestwich to Bury and Ratcliffe in the County Palatine of Lancaster. (Repealed by Prestwich, Bury and Radcliffe Roads Act 1857 (20 & 21 Vict. c. cvii))
Glasgow and Carlisle Road Act 1832	2 & 3 Will. 4. c. c	23 June 1832
An Act for amending and enlarging the Powers and renewing the Term granted by certain Acts passed for improving the Communication between the City of Glasgow and the City of Carlisle.
Elvan Foot and Beattock Bridge Road (Lanarkshire and Dumfriesshire) Act 1832	2 & 3 Will. 4. c. ci	23 June 1832
An Act for amending and continuing the Acts relating to the Road from Elvan Foot in the County of Lanark to Beatock Bridge in the County of Dumfries.
Three Commotts District of Roads (Carmarthen) Act 1832 (repealed)	2 & 3 Will. 4. c. cii	23 June 1832
An Act for better maintaining certain Roads within the County of Carmarthen called "The Three Commotts District of Roads," and for making several Branches, Diversions, and Extensions from such Roads. (Repealed by Turnpike Trusts in South Wales Act 1844 (7 & 8 Vict. c. 91))
Cork General Hospital Act 1832 (repealed)	2 & 3 Will. 4. c. ciii	4 July 1832
An Act for uniting the Funds of the North and South Charitable Infirmaries of the City of Cork, and for establishing in lieu of such Infirmaries One General Hospital for the said City. (Repealed by Statute Law (Repeals) Act 2013 (c. 2))
Inverness County Offices Act 1832	2 & 3 Will. 4. c. civ	4 July 1832
An Act for erecting and maintaining a new Court House and Public Offices for the County of Inverness.
Hull and Humber Pilotage Act 1832	2 & 3 Will. 4. c. cv	4 July 1832
An Act for better regulating the Pilotage of the Port of Kingston-upon-Hull and of the River Humber, and for other Purposes relating thereto.
Exeter Improvement Act 1832 (repealed)	2 & 3 Will. 4. c. cvi	4 July 1832
An Act for better paving, lighting, watching, cleansing, and otherwise improving the City of Exeter and County of the same City. (Repealed by Exeter City Council Act 1987 (c. xi))
Londonderry Improvement Act 1832 (repealed)	2 & 3 Will. 4. c. cvii	4 July 1832
An Act to make more effectual Provisions for lighting, cleansing, and watching the City of Londonderry, and to amend several Acts relating to the said City. (Repealed by Londonderry Port and Harbour Act 1854 (17 & 18 Vict. c. clxxvii))
Ossett-cum-Gawthorpe Inhabitants' Discharge from Customary Duty to grind Corn at Wakefield and Horbury Mills Act 1832	2 & 3 Will. 4. c. cviii	4 July 1832
An Act for discharging the Inhabitants of the Township of Ossett-cum-Gawthorpe in the Parish of Dewsbury in the County of York from the Custom of grinding Corn, Grain, and Malt at certain Water Corn Mills in the Townships of Wakefield and Horbury and in the Parish of Sandal in the said County; and for making Compensation to the Proprietor of the said Mills.
Beverley, Hessle and North Cave Turnpike Roads (Yorkshire) Act 1832	2 & 3 Will. 4. c. cix	4 July 1832
An Act for maintaining certain Roads in the Neighbourhood of the Towns of Beverley, of Kingston-upon-Hull, and of North Cave, called "The Beverley, Hessle, and North Cave Turnpike Roads."
Metropolitan General Cemetery Act 1832	2 & 3 Will. 4. c. cx	11 July 1832
An Act for establishing a General Cemetery for the Interment of the Dead in the Neighbourhood of the Metropolis.
Gloucester and Berkeley Canal Company Act 1832	2 & 3 Will. 4. c. cxi	11 July 1832
An Act for consolidating the several Shares of the Proprietors of the Gloucester and Berkeley Canal Company, and for converting the Interests of the several Parties holding Debentures, Annuities, and Optional Notes into Shares; and for altering and enlarging the Powers of the several Acts passed for making and maintaining the said Canal.
East India Company Act 1832 (repealed)	2 & 3 Will. 4. c. cxii	11 July 1832
An Act for providing for the Discharge of a Claim in respect of Monies advanced by the late James Hodges Esquire on Security of the Lands of the late Zemindar of Nozeed and Mustaphanagur, in the District of Fort Saint George in the East Indies, now under the Government of the Honourable the East India Company. (Repealed by Statute Law (Repeals) Act 2008 (c. 12))
Portman Market Act 1832	2 & 3 Will. 4. c. cxiii	17 July 1832
An Act to amend and enlarge the Powers of an Act (Note: Portman Market, Marylebone Act 1830 (11 Geo. 4 & 1 Will. 4. c. lxxi)) for establishing Portman Market within the County of Middlesex.

=== Private acts ===
Short title	Citation	Royal assent
Long title
Aston Rowant Inclosure Act 1832	2 & 3 Will. 4. c. 1 Pr.	20 February 1832
An Act for inclosing Lands in the Parish of Aston Rowant in the County of Oxford.
Caversham Inclosure Act 1832	2 & 3 Will. 4. c. 2 Pr.	3 April 1832
An Act for inclosing Lands in the Parish of Caversham in the County of Oxford.
Bubwith and Hartlethorpe Inclosure Act 1832	2 & 3 Will. 4. c. 3 Pr.	23 May 1832
An Act for inclosing Lands in the Townships of Bubwith and Hartlethorpe in the Parish of Bubwith in the East Riding of the County of York.
Clifton Inclosure Act 1832	2 & 3 Will. 4. c. 4 Pr.	1 June 1832
An Act for inclosing and exonerating from Tithes Lands in the Parish of Clifton in the County of Bedford.
Hagley Inclosure Act 1832	2 & 3 Will. 4. c. 5 Pr.	1 June 1832
An Act for inclosing certain Commons or Tracts of Waste Lands called Harberrow and Blakedown Commons, in the Parish of Hagley in the County of Worcester.
Murray's Estate Act 1832	2 & 3 Will. 4. c. 6 Pr.	6 June 1832
An Act for effecting the Sale of certain Estates in the County of Donegal in Ireland devised by the Will of James Murray Esquire, deceased, and for laying out the Money arising from such Sale, under the Direction of the High Court of Chancery, in the Purchase of other Estates, to be settled to the same Uses.
Bausely Inclosure Act 1832	2 & 3 Will. 4. c. 7 Pr.	6 June 1832
An Act for inclosing Lands in the Township of Ballesley otherwise Bausley within the Parish of Alberbury in the County of Montgomery.
Lord Douglas's Estate Act 1832	2 & 3 Will. 4. c. 8 Pr.	23 June 1832
An Act for vesting in Archibald Lord Douglas of Douglas, or the Heir of Entail in possession for the Time, certain detached Parts of the Douglas Estates in Fee Simple, upon entailing certain other Lands equivalent in Value thereto.
Richardson's Estate Act 1832	2 & 3 Will. 4. c. 9 Pr.	23 June 1832
An Act to empower the Judges of the Court of Session in Scotland to sell such Part or Parts of the Entailed Estates belonging to John Richardson Esquire, of Pitfour, in the County of Perth, as shall be sufficient for Payment of the Debts and Provisions affecting the same.
Archdeaconry of Durham Act 1832	2 & 3 Will. 4. c. 10 Pr.	23 June 1832
An Act for separating the Rectory of Easington in the County and Diocese of Durham from the Archdeaconry of Durham, and annexing in lieu thereof a Prebend or Canonry founded in the Cathedral Church of Durham.
Pusey's Estate Act 1832	2 & 3 Will. 4. c. 11 Pr.	23 June 1832
An Act for vesting certain Settled Estates of Philip Pusey Esquire, in the Counties of Kent and Berks, in Trustees for Sale, and for laying out the Money thence arising in the Purchase of other Estates, to be settled to the same Uses.
Thornbury Inclosure Act 1832	2 & 3 Will. 4. c. 12 Pr.	23 June 1832
An Act for inclosing Lands in the Parish of Thornbury in the County of Gloucester.
Hill and Moor Inclosure Act 1832	2 & 3 Will. 4. c. 13 Pr.	23 June 1832
An Act for inclosing Lands within the Hamlet of Hill and Moor in the Parish of Fladbury in the County of Worcester.
Boughey's Estate Act 1832	2 & 3 Will. 4. c. 14 Pr.	4 July 1832
An Act for exchanging Part of the Settled Estates of Sir Thomas Fletcher Fenton Boughey Baronet for Part of his Fee Simple Estate.
Hodgson's Estate Act 1832	2 & 3 Will. 4. c. 15 Pr.	4 July 1832
An Act for vesting the Real Estates devised by the Will of Ellis Leckonby Hodgson Esquire, deceased, in Everton within the Manor of West Derby in the County of Lancaster, in Trustees, to be sold for paying off an Incumbrance thereon; for dividing Two Third Parts of the Residue of the Purchase Money among the Devisees of Two Third Parts of the said Estates, and for investing the remaining One Third Part of the said Money in the Purchase of other Estates, or on Securities to the same Uses as the other Third Part of the said devised Estates.
Warrington Blue Coat School's Estate Act 1832	2 & 3 Will. 4. c. 16 Pr.	4 July 1832
An Act for empowering the Trustees of the Blue Coat Charity School in Warrington in the County of Lancaster to make Sales and to grant Building and Mining Leases of certain Parts of the Estates belonging to the said Charity, and for other Purposes therein mentioned.
Wilson's and Greswolde's Estate Act 1832	2 & 3 Will. 4. c. 17 Pr.	4 July 1832
An Act for establishing and carrying into effect an Agreement for a Partition between William Henry Bowen Jordan Wilson Esquire and Edmund Meysey Wigley Greswolde Esquire of Estates in the County of Warwick.
Lord Rivers's Estate Act 1832	2 & 3 Will. 4. c. 18 Pr.	4 July 1832
An Act for effectually settling all the Estates in Great Britain which by the Will of the late Right Honourable George Pitt Lord Rivers deceased, dated the Fifteenth of March One thousand eight hundred and twenty-three, are required to be settled by the Right Honourable George Pitt Rivers, now Lord Rivers, to the Uses directed by such Will.
Durham University Act 1832	2 & 3 Will. 4. c. 19 Pr.	4 July 1832
An Act to enable the Dean and Chapter of Durham to appropriate Part of the Property of their Church to the Establishment of a University in connexion therewith for the Advancement of Learning.
Aston juxta Birmingham Vicarage Act 1832	2 & 3 Will. 4. c. 20 Pr.	4 July 1832
An Act to authorize the Patrons or Patron for the Time being of the Vicarage of Aston juxta Birmingham in the County of Warwick to appropriate and assign any Part of the Tithes and Vicarial Dues belonging to the said Vicarage, or any Rentcharge issuing out of the same, for endowing certain new Churches within the said Vicarage if converted into District Parishes or Vicarages, and for selling the Advowsons of the same Churches or new Benefices.
Antrobus' Estate Act 1832	2 & 3 Will. 4. c. 21 Pr.	4 July 1832
An Act to authorize the granting of Leases of certain Parts of the Estates (subject to the Trusts of the Will) of Philip Antrobus Gentleman, deceased.
Rockingham and Gretton Inclosure and Deforestation Act 1832	2 & 3 Will. 4. c. 22 Pr.	4 July 1832
An Act for disafforesting and inclosing so much of the Forest of Rockingham as is situate within the Bailiwick of Rockingham, and for inclosing Open and Common Field Lands in Gretton, all within the County o£ Northampton.
Saltoun and Haddington Estates Act 1832	2 & 3 Will. 4. c. 23 Pr.	11 July 1832
An Act to vest a Fart of the Entailed Estate of Saltoun and others in the County of Haddington in Trustees, to sell the same, and apply the Price thereof, or the Securities to be granted thereon, towards satisfying the Debts contracted for Money laid out in the Improvement of the said Entailed Estate; and for feuing certain Parts of the said Entailed Estate in the County of Edinburgh.
Bushnell's Estate Act 1832	2 & 3 Will. 4. c. 24 Pr.	11 July 1832
An Act to enable the Reverend John Bushnell and the Trustees of the Will of John Bushnell Esquire, deceased, to effect a Sale to Philip Pusey Esquire of the Manor or Lordship of Charney, and a certain Messuage, Lands, and Premises therein, in the County of Berks.
Brodie Estate Act 1832	2 & 3 Will. 4. c. 25 Pr.	17 July 1832
An Act to invest a Part of the Entailed Estates of Brodie, and others, in the Counties of Elgin and Nairn, in Trustees in Fee Simple, for the Purpose of selling the Lands so vested, and of applying the Price thereof, or the Securities to be granted thereon, towards satisfying Debts, Provisions, and others contracted by the Entailer, and for Money laid out by the Heir of Entail m the Improvement of the said Entailed Estates.
Slingsby's Estate Act 1832	2 & 3 Will. 4. c. 26 Pr.	17 July 1832
An Act for exchanging Fee Simple Estates of Sir Thomas Slingsby Baronet, situate at Scriven, Scotton, and Farnham, and in the Parishes of Knaresbrough and Farnham, in the County of York, and not in Settlement, for a Part of his Settled Estate situate at Wollas otherwise Woolhouse in the Township of Appleton Roebuck and Parish of Bolton Percy in the County of the City of York; and for charging the Estates taken in exchange with a Portion for Emma Louisa Catharine Slingsby, the infant Daughter of Charles Slingsby Esquire, deceased.
Ladbroke's Estate Act 1832	2 & 3 Will. 4. c. 27 Pr.	17 July 1832
An Act to confirm certain Leases granted by James Weller Ladbroke Esouire of Land and Premises at Nottinghill in the County of Middlesex; and for other Purposes.
Lord Gwydir's Estate Act 1832	2 & 3 Will. 4. c. 28 Pr.	1 August 1832
An Act for vesting the Estates in the County of Sussex devised by a Codicil to the Will of the Right Honourable Peter late Lord Gwydir, deceased, in Trustees, upon Trust to sell the same, and for laying out the Residue of the Monies arising from such Sale, after Payment thereout of a Charge affecting the same Estates, in the Purchase of other Estates, to be settled to the same Uses.
Walpole Inclosure Act 1832	2 & 3 Will. 4. c. 29 Pr.	1 August 1832
An Act for dividing, allotting, and inclosing certain open Common Salt Marshes in the Township of Walpole in the County of Norfolk.
Antonie's Estate Act 1832	2 & 3 Will. 4. c. 30 Pr.	4 August 1832
An Act for vesting the Fee Simple of Part of the Freehold Estates devised by the Will of William Lee Antonie Esquire, deceased, in strict Settlement, in his Nephew, John Lee Esquire, Doctor of Laws (subject to a Term of Five hundred Years, as an Indemnification against a Sum of Ten thousand Pounds and Interest); and for substituting Part of the Fee Simple Estates of the said John Lee in lieu thereof; and also for appointing new Trustees of the said Settled Estates.
Cuninghame's Estate Act 1832	2 & 3 Will. 4. c. 31 Pr.	4 August 1832
An Act for exchanging certain detached Parts of the Entailed Estate of Craigends in the County of Renfrew, belonging to William Cuninghame Esquire, for certain other Lands held by him in Fee Simple.
White's Estate Act 1832	2 & 3 Will. 4. c. 32 Pr.	9 August 1832
An Act for authorizing the Trustees of John White the elder, deceased, to complete on their Part an Exchange of certain Lands at Millbank in the County of Middlesex; and for vesting the exchanged Lands and other Hereditaments in the Trustees of the Marriage Settlement of William Leaper Newton Esquire and Henrietta his Wife, with Power of Sale.
Martin's Estate Act 1832	2 & 3 Will. 4. c. 33 Pr.	11 August 1832
An Act for enabling James Thomas Martin Esquire, and the Persons in Remainder under the Will of Mary Jackson deceased, to grant Leases of Part of the Settled Estates therein comprised, for the Purpose of building upon and otherwise improving the same.
Marquis of Londonderry's Estate Act 1832	2 & 3 Will. 4. c. 34 Pr.	11 August 1832
An Act for settling certain Manors and Estates in the County of Durham to the Uses of the Marriage Settlement of the Most Honourable Charles William Vane Marquis of Londonderry and the Most Honourable Prances Anne Vane Marchioness of Londonderry his Wife, and for other Purposes therein mentioned.
Manerowen Inclosure Act 1832 (Note: This act was not printed by the King's Printer)	2 & 3 Will. 4. c. 35 Pr.	20 February 1832
An Act for inclosing Lands in the Parish of Manerowen in the County of Pembroke.
Pasteur's Naturalization Act 1832	2 & 3 Will. 4. c. 36 Pr.	20 February 1832
An Act for naturalizing Pierre Jaques Adolphe Pasteur.
Panizzi's Naturalization Act 1832	2 & 3 Will. 4. c. 37 Pr.	24 March 1832
An Act for naturalizing Antonio Panizzi Esquire.
Codwise's Naturalization Act 1832	2 & 3 Will. 4. c. 38 Pr.	24 March 1832
An Act for naturalizing Edward Codwise.
Smith's Divorce Act 1832	2 & 3 Will. 4. c. 39 Pr.	3 April 1832
An Act to dissolve the Marriage of Josiah Smith with Elizabeth his Wife, and to enable him to marry again; and for other Purposes.
Metté's Naturalization Act 1832	2 & 3 Will. 4. c. 40 Pr.	3 April 1832
An Act for naturalizing Echardt Martin Metté.
Clayton's Divorce Act 1832	2 & 3 Will. 4. c. 41 Pr.	23 May 1832
An Act to dissolve the Marriage of William Robert Clayton Esquire with Alice Hugh Massy his now Wife, and to enable him to marry again; and for other Purposes.
Lockhart's Name Act 1832	2 & 3 Will. 4. c. 42 Pr.	23 May 1832
An Act for continuing, establishing, and confirming unto and upon John Ingram Lockhart Esquire the Surname and Arms of Wastie, pursuant to the Will of Francis Wastie Esquire, deceased.
Proby Benefaction Act 1832 (repealed)	2 & 3 Will. 4. c. 43 Pr.	6 June 1832
An Act to repeal an Act passed in the Third Year of the Reign of His Majesty King George the Third, (Note: Edmund Proby's Benefaction Act 1763 (3 Geo. 3. c. 36 Pr.)) to enable the Master, Fellows, and Scholars of Jesus College in the University of Cambridge to alter and vary the Benefaction of Doctor Edmund Proby and Sir Thomas Proby, and to appropriate the same for the Benefit of the said College in the Augmentation of several small Rectories and Vicarages; and further to appropriate the said Benefaction. (Repealed by Jesus College, Proby Trust Act 1853 (16 & 17 Vict. c. 17 Pr.))
Patzeker's Naturalization Act 1832	2 & 3 Will. 4. c. 44 Pr.	1 August 1832
An Act for naturalizing Edward Patzeker.

=== Sources ===
- Volume 72 - 2 & 3 William IV - 1832. 1807 – via Internet Archive.
- Volume 72 - 2 & 3 William IV - 1832. 1807 – via Google Books.
- The Statutes of the United Kingdom of Great Britain and Ireland. Vol. 12. George Eyre and Andrew Strahan, Printers to the King's Most Excellent Majesty. 1832 – via Google Books.
- Journal of the House of Commons. Vol. 87. London: His Majesty's Stationery Office. pp. 3–591.

== See also ==
- List of acts of the Parliament of the United Kingdom
