= Superannuation Act =

Stock short title used for legislation

Superannuation Act is a stock short title used in New Zealand and the United Kingdom for legislation relating to superannuation.

== List ==
=== New Zealand ===
- The Superannuation Act 1947 (No 57)

=== United Kingdom ===
- The Superannuation Act 2010 (c. 37)
- The Superannuation Act 1972 (c. 11)
- The Superannuation (Miscellaneous Provisions) Act 1967 (c. 28)
- The Superannuation Act 1965 (c. 74)
- The Superannuation (Amendment) Act 1965 (c. 10)
- The Superannuation Act 1957 (5 & 6 Eliz. 2. c. 37)
- The Superannuation Act 1950 (14 & 15 Geo. 6. c. 2)
- The Superannuation Act 1949 (12, 13 & 14 Geo. 6. c. 44)
- The Superannuation (Miscellaneous Provisions) Act 1948 (11 & 12 Geo. 6. c. 33)
- The Superannuation Act 1946 (9 & 10 Geo. 6. c. 60)
- The Superannuation Schemes (War Service) Act 1940 (3 & 4 Geo. 6. c. 26)
- The Superannuation (Various Services) Act 1938 (1 & 2 Geo. 6. c. 13)
- The Superannuation Act 1935 (25 & 26 Geo. 5. c. 23)
- The Superannuation (Diplomatic Service) Act 1929 (19 Geo. 5. c. 11)
- The Superannuation and other Trust Funds (Validation) Act 1927 (17 & 18 Geo. 5. c. 41)
- The Superannuation Act 1914 (4 & 5 Geo. 5. c. 86)
- The Superannuation Act 1909 (9 Edw. 7. c. 10)
- The Overseas Superannuation Act 1991 (c. 16)
- The British Council and Commonwealth Institute Superannuation Act 1986 (c. 51)
- The Local Government Superannuation Act 1953 (1 & 2 Eliz. 2. c. 25)
- The Local Government Superannuation Act 1939 (2 & 3 Geo. 6. c 18)
- The Local Government Superannuation (Scotland) Act 1937 (1 Edw. 8 & 1 Geo. 6. c. 69)
- The Local Government Superannuation Act 1937 (1 Edw. 8 & 1 Geo. 6. c. 68)
- The Teachers Superannuation (Scotland) Act 1968 (c. 12)
- The Teachers' Superannuation Act 1967 (c. 12)
- The Teachers (Superannuation) Act 1956 (c. 53)
- The Education (Scotland) (War Service Superannuation) Act 1939 (c. 96)
- The Metropolitan Police (Staff Superannuation and Police Fund) Act 1931 (c. 12)
- The Superannuation (Miscellaneous Provisions) Act (Northern Ireland) 1969 (c. 7 (N.I.))
- The Superannuation Act (Northern Ireland) 1967 (c. 24 (N.I.))
- The Superannuation (Amendment) Act (Northern Ireland) 1966 (c. 27 (N.I.))
- The Superannuation (Miscellaneous Provisions) Act (Northern Ireland) 1951 (c. 28 (N.I.))
- The Local Government (Superannuation) Act (Northern Ireland) 1950 (c. 10 (N.I.))
- The Superannuation Schemes (War Service) Act (Northern Ireland) 1941 (c. 6 (N.I.))
- The Superannuation and Other Trust Funds (Validation) Act (Northern Ireland) 1928 (c. 6 (N.I.))

The Superannuation Acts 1834 to 1892 was the collective title of the following Acts:

- The Superannuation Act 1834 (4 & 5 Will. 4. c. 24)
- The Superannuation Act 1859 (22 Vict. c. 26)
- The Superannuation Act 1860 (23 & 24 Vict. c. 89)
- The Superannuation Act 1866 (29 & 30 Vict. c. 68)
- The Superannuation Act 1876 (39 & 40 Vict. c. 53)
- The Superannuation Act 1881 (44 & 45 Vict. c. 43)
- The Superannuation Act 1884 (47 & 48 Vict. c. 57)
- The Superannuation Act 1887 (50 & 51 Vict. c. 67)
- The Superannuation Act 1892 (55 & 56 Vict. c. 40)

== See also ==
- List of short titles
