= Job sharing =

Employment arrangement

Job sharing or work sharing is an employment arrangement where two people, or sometimes more, are retained on a part-time or reduced-time basis to perform a job normally fulfilled by one person working full-time. This leads to a net reduction in per-employee income. The people sharing the job work as a team to complete the job task and are jointly responsible for the job workload. Pay, holidays and working hours are apportioned between the workers. In some countries, systems such as pay as you go and PAYE help make deductions for national insurance, and superannuations are made as a straightforward percentage.

== History in the United States ==
The news media began reporting in earnest on job sharing in the 1970s and 1980s. The practice was most often described as a solution tailored for women, as one Associated Press article summarized, "a compromise between fulltime housework and full-time employment".

=== 1970s ===
In 1972 the New Ways to Work Foundation was funded, it is a non-profit organization founded in the San Francisco Bay area. Its main focus was to help "establish a work world that responds to the changing needs of individuals and organizations".

In 1978 the International Personnel Management Association and the Institute of Local Self Government joined with New Ways to Work to sponsor a conference on job sharing in the public sector. More than 80 public agencies sent representatives who were to learn about the experiences in increasing the number of job sharing projects. The Part Time Career Employment Act pl 95-437 was passed in 1978 as well. It narrowed the definition of part-time career employment from scheduled work of less than 40 hours a week to scheduled work between 16 and 32 hours per week.

=== 2000s ===
Job sharing became even more prevalent during the 2000s, as women have succeeded professionally in greater numbers and proportionally seek out alternative work arrangements. in the early 2000s, two important factors began to push the job sharing movement. Access to information became increasingly open and demographics in the workforce began to change. The birth of the World Wide Web made it easier for companies and job share participants to share information through web tools like email, instant messaging, web portals, online databases and multi-user domains, these web tools allowed employees to share work in a more collaborative environment and in an asynchronous manner. The ever-changing demographics in the United States also drove the job sharing arrangement. With most of the baby boomer generation leaving the United States workforce and retiring, generation X and Y transitioned their lifestyles to an even better balance between family and work. Gender has also impacted the work force demographics: in 2004, women made up 59% of the workforce, with 50% of them in management professional positions. The banking, insurance, teaching and library professions are cited as more commonly using job sharing. Some companies that use job sharing include New York Life Insurance Company, Fireman's Fund Insurance Company, and Walgreens drugstores.

==== Modern implementation in pharmacy academia ====
In pharmacy academia, job-sharing has been seen as a tool to help encourage and increase female employment. Female pharmacists, compared to males, desire to work part-time earlier on in their careers. There is a shortage in the pharmacy field of women due to some employers not providing flexible enough schedules to match the desires of female employees. In academia a similar problem exists, only 20% of full professors were women in 2007 even though 66% of students enrolled in pharmacy schools are women. In order to retain and increase female employment in the educational field, the University of Tennessee College of Pharmacy implemented job-sharing in 2007 and has observed a noticeable improvement.

== In other countries and areas ==
=== South Africa ===
In South Africa, job sharing has been implemented into the work force. CEO of Kelly, South Africa's first job recruitment agency, Kayee Vittee, believes "The more pressure exists in the workplace, the more severe the impact on quality and productivity. Subsequently, this also has a detrimental effect on employees' wellbeing in general". Solidarity, a South African trade union that also protects and negotiates workers rights recently developed a social plan that encourages job share as an optimum alternative to full-time jobs. South Africa's current economy, as of April, 2016, is erratic and unemployment rate is high, so South African citizens unfortunately do not see job share as a solution though it is a beneficial resolution for the current economy.

=== Australia ===
Jeremy Hayman, a senior lecturer at Auckland University of Technology in New Zealand specializing in Human Resource Management and Employee Relations collected data and completed a questionnaire from office employees in a large Western Australia university. Though the study was limited to University employees, the primary and recognized finding is that the flexibility provided by job sharing can benefit the integration of work, family and personal life, ultimately providing a better work experience for the employee and a better work environment especially in women aged 30–39. Though the literature on job share in Australia is largely under represented compared to other developed countries, Hayman's research was more responsive than other preexisting Australian surveys regarding job share. The findings for this study is a great foundation for the future of job share in Australia and transforming management practice and work and social life balance.

=== Europe ===
The United Kingdom has implemented job sharing for a while. In many European countries, the job sharing arrangement is already a common practice in the workforce. Companies in countries like the Czech Republic and Poland have just recently supported job sharing on widespread scale without contractual restrictions. Other European countries like Slovenia and Slovakia have enforced legitimate job share governing. A European union agency, Eurofound, was created by the European council in May 1975 to create better working and living environments for Europeans. Eurofound meets annually to decide new policies and adapt to changing times and in 2015, Eurofound formally defined job sharing as a new form of employment.

=== Caribbean ===
Caribbean countries like Puerto Rico and Haiti have also begun to practice job sharing. A few of the Caribbean islands in the Western hemisphere that have yet to adapt to the growth in the economy can possibly benefit most from job share. Many of these Caribbean countries and islands have experienced a large number of their qualified human capital who have moved towards the United States mainland, making the job supply and demand market more inconsistent and the economy more unstable. The job share program proves to be a very cost conscious from economic and business prospects.

== Advantages and disadvantages ==
=== Advantages ===
Employees who switch to job share from a full-time job often feel less stressed because they have more time for social and family personal activities. The ever-changing demographics of today's workforce require more flexibility to accomplish a desirable work–life balance, hence making job sharing a viable and even preferred option for many. Job share has proven to be extremely convenient to expecting mothers, mothers and caretakers by providing them with a more flexible and less demanding job schedule and load and allowing them to take care of their dependents. Job share employees who don't have a constant workload and do not need to constantly commute to a job on a daily basis, lowers their stress levels, resulting in healthier lives and work–life balances. For employees seeking more free time for themselves, job sharing may be a way to take back more control of their personal lives. Employees who job share frequently attribute their decision to an improvement in "quality of life".

For an employer, job sharing is a benefit because it keeps two valuable employees, thereby increasing intellectual capital and experience. Job sharing can also prevent future employee burnouts from high stress careers while also making the work atmosphere more enjoyable for all. Successful job share pairing creates a mutual relationship and feel accountable for one another, consequently increasing the accomplishments they achieve together. Studies have shown that net productivity increases when two people share the same 40-hour job, making for a more effective and more than likely profitable workplace for the employer.

=== Disadvantages ===
Job share can be conflicting if the job share participants/employees are not open to a mutual agreement to distribute everything from salary, workload and time off. Job sharing can also be a disadvantage if the employee cannot afford the part-time wages or benefits. It is also possible that job sharing can make an employee feel less adequate over time and cause less productivity over time. If the job share arrangement is not effective, the transition period to finding another partner could be disruptive and detrimental to the remaining employee. If proper communication and effort does not happen between the job share participants, job share can be a negative experience because the coworkers can not be held accountable to the same expectations, shifting the delicate balance of the job share arrangement.

The disadvantages for employers can start immediately if the employer is not able to successfully match two people to the job share arrangement. This can negatively effect management because of the extra effort and time could take to produce a harmonious job share arrangement. Though job share arrangements generally split the salary in half, training two employees for a job that can be satisfied by one employee could increase administrative costs. Employers may also experience a more difficult time finding prospective employees who genuinely want to participate in job share.

== See also ==
- Collaborative editing
- Collaborative writing
- Document collaboration
- Full employment
- Joint authorship
- Power sharing
- Short time (short-time working)
