= Kurzarbeit =

Program of state wage subsidies

Kurzarbeit is the German name for a program of state wage subsidies in which private-sector employees agree to or are forced to accept a reduction in working hours and pay, with public subsidies making up for all or part of the lost wages.

Several Central European countries use such subsidies to limit the impact on the economy as a whole or a particular sector from short-term threats such as a recession, pandemic, or natural disaster. The idea is to temporarily subsidize companies to avoid layoffs or bankruptcies during a temporary external disruption. Most notably, such subsidy programs were used to offset the effects of the COVID-19 pandemic and recession starting in 2020.

== Austria ==
In Austria, the introduction of Kurzarbeit requires a special arrangement between what are called the "social partners" of Austrian collective bargaining—the Chamber of Commerce representing employers and the labor unions representing employees—on the scope and duration of the Kurzarbeit arrangement, the conditions for any layoffs during the arrangement, and the extent of any professional development or retraining courses included.

== Czech Republic ==
Amid the COVID-19 pandemic in the Czech Republic, the government of Czech Republic under Andrej Babiš announced plans to partially subsidize salaries of employees on reduced work schedules, covering 50–70% of pay for 1, 2, or up to 4 days per week that employees are at home due to shocks that are coming to companies from pandemics or natural disasters. Employers have to cover health and social insurance for the days when workers are at home, and employees contribute by the partial reduction in their pay.

== Germany ==
It was in Germany that a system of "Kurzarbeitergeld" (Kurzarbeit benefits) was first introduced, on May 25, 1910, to address a downturn in the potash mining and fertilizer industry. It became fully established in 1924 in response to the first economic crisis of the Weimar Republic. Under the scheme, temporarily laid-off workers receive payments, now from the Federal Employment Agency (BA), the agency that is also responsible for issuing unemployment benefits. The companies pay the hours actually worked at the original salary, while the state (or the BA, precisely) compensates 60 percent of the original pay for each hour not worked. This means that an individual might work 30 per cent less while experiencing only a 10 percent loss in income.

In 2009, the German government had budgeted 5.1 billion euros for the program, which replaced some of the lost income of over 1.4 million workers. The program was favorably cited in a 2009 Organisation for Economic Co-operation and Development (OECD) report, which stated that it had saved nearly 500,000 jobs during the recession. It is "widely considered the gold standard of such programs", according to the IMF. Besides helping to avoid mass layoffs, proponents of the program also cite its keeping skilled work groups together and avoiding the atrophy of their skills during extended layoffs, while critics have expressed concerns about its expense and that it might prop up non-viable firms.

During the COVID-19 pandemic, the level of the compensation for cut hours was raised. If working hours are reduced by at least 50%, the Kurzarbeitergeld covered 70% of the lost salary from the 4th to 6th month, and 80% from the 7th month onward. This change to the original scheme was applicable until December 31, 2021. The maximum duration was also extended to 24 months through December 31, 2021, if the Kurzarbeit had already started in 2020.

== Romania ==
Due to the economic difficulties caused by the COVID-19 pandemic, the Romanian government is considering adopting a measure based on the German model of Kurzarbeit (as of 2020).

== See also ==
- Furlough, a temporary layoff legal in the United States (term also used for a similar instrument in the United Kingdom during the COVID-19 pandemic in 2020)
- Job sharing, also called work sharing
- Unemployment
