= Superannuation Act 1949 =

Act of the Parliament of the United Kingdom

Superannuation Act 1949 (Note: Section 41(1).)
- Act of Parliament
- Parliament of the United Kingdom
- Long title: An Act to amend the law relating to the superannuation and other benefits payable to and in respect of persons who serve or have served in the civil service of the State or in service to which the Superannuation (Various Services) Act, 1938, applies or are existing Irish officers within the meaning of the Government of Ireland Act, 1920; to authorise the payment of annual allowances and gratuities to and in respect of persons who are injured or contract diseases while employed in a civil capacity for the purposes of His Majesty's Government in the United Kingdom; and for purposes connected with the matters aforesaid.
- Citation: 12, 13 & 14 Geo. 6. c. 44
- Territorial extent: United Kingdom

Dates
- Royal assent: 14 July 1949
- Commencement: 14 July 1949 (Note: The Acts of Parliament (Commencement) Act 1793.)
- Repealed: 25 March 1972 (Note: The Superannuation Act 1972 (Commencement No. 1) Order 1972.)
Other legislation
Amended by	Governors' Pensions Act 1957; Mental Health Act 1959; Statute Law Revision Act 1964; Pensions (Increase) Act 1971
Repealed by	Income Tax Act 1952; Statute Law Revision Act 1953; Superannuation Act 1965; Forestry Act 1967; Pensions (Increase) Act 1971; Superannuation Act 1972

Status: Repealed

Text of statute as originally enacted

The Superannuation Act 1949 (12, 13 & 14 Geo. 6. c. 44) was an act of the Parliament of the United Kingdom by the Labour government of Clement Attlee. Amongst other changes, it ensured that pensions on a contributory basis were provided for the widow and dependents of an established civil servant. It also ensure that a civil servant retiring after his 50th birthday could retain accrued pension rights, which would become payable on his sixtieth birthday (although the Treasury could, on compassionate grounds, grant such a pension immediately).

== See also ==
- Superannuation Act
