= Exchequer Bills and Bonds Act 1866 =

Act of the Parliament of the United Kingdom

Exchequer Bills and Bonds Act 1866 (Note: This short title was conferred on this act by section 1 of the Treasury Bills Act 1877 (40 & 41 Vict. c. 2). The citation of this act by this short title was authorised by section 1 of, and the first schedule to, the Short Titles Act 1896. Due to the repeal of those provisions it is now authorised by section 19(2) of the Interpretation Act 1978.)
- Act of Parliament
- Parliament of the United Kingdom
- Long title: An Act to consolidate and amend the several Laws regulating the Preparation, Issue, and Payment of Exchequer Bills and Bonds.
- Citation: 29 & 30 Vict. c. 25
- Territorial extent: United Kingdom

Dates
- Royal assent: 18 May 1866
- Commencement: 1 April 1867 (Note: Section 31.)
- Repealed: 10 March 1966
Other legislation
Amends	See § Repealed enactments
Repeals/revokes	See § Repealed enactments
Amended by	Treasury Bills Act 1877; Forgery Act 1913; Finance Act 1916; Statute Law Revision Act 1950; Statute Law Revision Act 1963; Statute Law Revision Act 1964
Repealed by	Statute Law Revision Act 1966
Relates to	Exchequer and Audit Departments Act 1866

Status: Repealed

Text of statute as originally enacted

The Exchequer Bills and Bonds Act 1866 (29 & 30 Vict. c. 25) was an act of the Parliament of the United Kingdom that consolidated enactments related to Exchequer Bills in the United Kingdom.

== Provisions ==
=== Repealed enactments ===
Section 1 of the act repealed 9 enactments, listed in that section.

Citation	Short title	Description	Extent of repeal
48 Geo. 3. c. 1	Issue and Payment of Exchequer Bills Act 1808	An Act passed in the Forty-eighth Year of King George the Third, Chapter One, intituled An Act for regulating the issuing and paying-off of Exchequer Bills	The whole act.
4 & 5 Will. 4. c. 15	Office of Receipt of Exchequer Act 1834	An Act passed in the Fourth Year of King William the Fourth, Chapter Fifteen, intituled An Act to regulate the Office of the Receipt of His Majesty's Exchequer at Westminster.	As relates to the Preparation and Issue of Exchequer Bills.
5 & 6 Vict. c. 66	Exchequer Bills (No. 2) Act 1842	An Act of the Fifth and Sixth Years of Her Majesty, Chapter Sixty-six, intituled An Act for further regulating the Preparation and Issue of Exchequer Bills.	The whole act.
24 & 25 Vict. c. 5	Exchequer Bills Act 1861	An Act of the Twenty-fourth Year of Her Majesty, Chapter Five, intituled An Act to amend the Law relating to Supply Exchequer Bills, and to charge the same on the Consolidated Fund.	The whole act.
25 & 26 Vict. c. 3	Exchequer Bills Act 1862	An Act of the Twenty-fifth Year of Her Majesty, Chapter Three, intituled An Act to amend an Act, intituled An Act to amend the Law relating to Supply Exchequer Bills, and to charge the same on the Consolidated Fund, and to repeal all Provisions by which Authority is given to the Commissioners of Her Majesty's Treasury to fund Exchequer Bills.	The whole act.
16 & 17 Vict. c. 23	National Debt Act 1853	An Act of the Sixteenth Year of Her Majesty, Chapter Twenty-three, intituled An Act for redeeming or commuting the Annuity payable to the South Sea Company, and certain Annuities of Three Pounds per Centum per Annum, and Two Pounds Ten Shillings per Centum per Annum.	As regulates the Preparation, Issue, and Course of Payment of Exchequer Bonds, viz.
16 & 17 Vict. c. 132	National Debt (No. 2) Act 1853	An Act of the Sixteenth and Seventeenth Years of Her Majesty, Chapter One hundred and thirty-two, intituled An Act to extend the Provisions of an Act of the present Session for redeeming or commuting the Annuity payable to the South Sea Company, and certain Annuities of Three Pounds per Centum per Annum, and to provide for Payments to be made under the said Act.	As regulates the Preparation, Issue, and Course of Payment of Exchequer Bonds, viz.
27 & 28 Vict. c. 74	Exchequer Bonds Act 1864	An Act of the Twenty-seventh and Twenty-eighth Years of Her Majesty, Chapter Seventy-four, intituled An Act for raising the Sum of One million siz hundred thousand Pounds by Exchequer Bonds for the Service of the Year One thousand eight hundred and sixty-four.	As regulates the Preparation, Issue, and Course of Payment of Exchequer Bonds, viz.
28 & 29 Vict. c. 29	Exchequer Bonds Act 1865	An Act of the Twenty-eighth and Twenty- ninth Years of Her Majesty, Chapter Twenty-nine, intituled An Act for raising the Sum of One million Pounds for the Service of the Year One thousand eight hundred and sixty-five.	As regulates the Preparation, Issue, and Course of Payment of Exchequer Bonds, viz.

== Subsequent developments ==
The proviso in section 3 of the act, so far as unrepealed, was repealed by section 1(1) of, and the first schedule to, the Statute Law Revision Act 1950 (14 Geo. 6. c. 6), which came into force on 23 May 1950.

In section 7, the words " or out of the growing produce thereof ", and section 28 of the act were repealed by section 1 of, and the schedule to, the Statute Law Revision Act 1963, which came into force on 31 July 1963.

The whole act was repealed by section 1 of, and the schedule to, the Statute Law Revision Act 1966, which came into force on 10 March 1966.
