= Guildford Crescent Baths =

Former swimming building in Cardiff, UK

Coordinates: 51.4798°N 3.1706°W

The Guildford Crescent Baths, originally known as the Cardiff Baths and, after 1873, as the Corporation Baths, was a public swimming pool building in the centre of Cardiff, Wales. It was demolished in 1985.

== Background ==
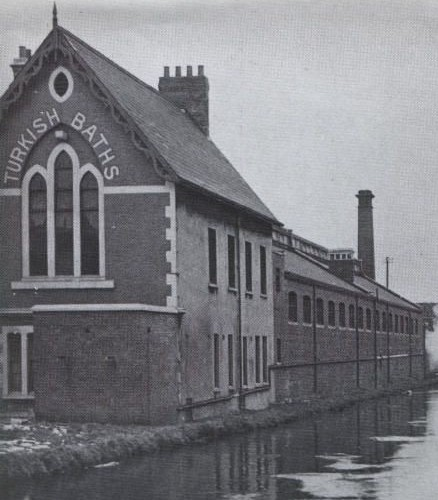
Victorian Turkish Baths in Guildford Crescent, Cardiff, with swimming pools behind

The swimming baths in Guildford Crescent, Cardiff, were originally opened by the Cardiff Baths Company Ltd in April 1862. They included first and second class swimming pools, Victorian Turkish baths with two hot rooms heated by dry air maintained at 110°F and 140°F, a Mikveh and a gymnasium. The building was designed by T. Waring and cost £3,700 to construct. With a capacity of one million gallons of water (4.5 million litres), the facilities were located next to the Bute Docks Feeder canal. The canal was culverted in 1949 and now flows under Churchill Way.

Cardiff Borough Council acquired the baths in 1873. Originally open-air, work began to add a roof to the baths in 1884 and took eight years to complete. The newly roofed and refurbished facilities were officially re-opened by in 1896 by Lady Windsor.

After the Empire Pool was opened in 1958, the Guildford Crescent Baths were given over exclusively for use by children.

The baths finally closed on 31 March 1984, despite a campaign to keep them open, which had gathered more than 10,000 signatures. The building was demolished in 1985 and, in the 2000s, an Ibis hotel was built on the site.
