= Indian Insolvency Act 1848 =

Act of the Parliament of the United Kingdom

Indian Insolvency Act 1848 (Note: The citation of this act by this short title was authorised by section 1 of, and the first schedule to, the Short Titles Act 1896. Due to the repeal of those provisions it is now authorised by section 19(2) of the Interpretation Act 1978.)
- Act of Parliament
- Parliament of the United Kingdom
- Long title: An Act to consolidate and amend the Laws relating to Insolvent Debtors in India.
- Citation: 11 & 12 Vict. c. 21
- Territorial extent: United Kingdom; British India

Dates
- Royal assent: 9 June 1848
- Commencement: 1 August 1848 (Note: Section 93.)
- Repealed: 1 January 1910
Other legislation
Amends	See § Repealed enactments
Repeals/revokes	See § Repealed enactments
Repealed by	Statute Law Revision Act 1875; Presidency Towns Insolvency Act 1909

Status: Repealed

Text of statute as originally enacted

The Indian Insolvency Act 1848 (11 & 12 Vict. c. 21) was an act of the Parliament of the United Kingdom that consolidated enactments related to insolvent debtors in British India.

== Provisions ==
=== Repealed enactments ===
Section 1 of the act repealed ? enactments, listed in that section.

Citation	Short title	Description	Extent of repeal
9 Geo. 4. c. 73	Insolvent Debtors (East Indies) Act 1828	An Act passed in the Ninth Year of the Reign of His late Majesty King George the Fourth, intituled An Act to provide for the Relief of Insolvent Debtors in the East Indies until the First Day of March One thousand eight hundred and thirty-three.	The whole act.
4 & 5 Will. 4. c. 79	Insolvent Debtors, India Act 1834	A certain other Act passed in a Session of Parliament holden in the Fourth and Fifth Years of the Reign of His late Majesty King William the Fourth, intituled An Act to amend the Laws relating to Insolvent Debtors in India.	The whole act.
9 & 10 Vict. c. 14	Insolvent Debtors (India) Act 1846	A certain other Act of Parliament passed in a Session holden in the Ninth and Tenth Years of Her present Majesty, intituled An Act to continue until the First Day of March One thousand eight hundred and forty-seven, and from thence to the End of the then next Session of Parliament, the several Acts relating to Insolvent Debtors in India.	The whole act.

== Subsequent developments ==
Section 1, section 7 from "and until" to end of that section, sections 16, 42 and 65–67, in section 68, the words "Master or". Section Eighty-eight from "and that" to end of that section, section 89 from "by the Recorder" to "Malacca", and from "from Time to Time to establish" to "practise in the said Court for the Relief of Insolvent Debtors, and", section 93 were repealed for to all Her Majesty's Dominions by section 1 of, and the schedule to, the Statute Law Revision Act 1875 (38 & 39 Vict. c. 66), which came into force on 11 August 1875.

The whole act, so far as unrepealed, was repealed by the Presidency Towns Insolvency Act 1909 (No. III), which came into force on 1 January 1910.
