= List of acts of the Parliament of the United Kingdom from 1834 =

This is a complete list of acts of the Parliament of the United Kingdom for the year 1834.

Note that the first parliament of the United Kingdom was held in 1801; parliaments between 1707 and 1800 were either parliaments of Great Britain or of Ireland). For acts passed up until 1707, see the list of acts of the Parliament of England and the list of acts of the Parliament of Scotland. For acts passed from 1707 to 1800, see the list of acts of the Parliament of Great Britain. See also the list of acts of the Parliament of Ireland.

For acts of the devolved parliaments and assemblies in the United Kingdom, see the list of acts of the Scottish Parliament, the list of acts of the Northern Ireland Assembly, and the list of acts and measures of Senedd Cymru; see also the list of acts of the Parliament of Northern Ireland.

The number shown after each act's title is its chapter number. Acts passed before 1963 are cited using this number, preceded by the year(s) of the reign during which the relevant parliamentary session was held; thus the Union with Ireland Act 1800 is cited as "39 & 40 Geo. 3 c. 67", meaning the 67th act passed during the session that started in the 39th year of the reign of George III and which finished in the 40th year of that reign. Note that the modern convention is to use Arabic numerals in citations (thus "41 Geo. 3" rather than "41 Geo. III"). Acts of the last session of the Parliament of Great Britain and the first session of the Parliament of the United Kingdom are both cited as "41 Geo. 3". Acts passed from 1963 onwards are simply cited by calendar year and chapter number.

All modern acts have a short title, e.g. the Local Government Act 2003. Some earlier acts also have a short title given to them by later acts, such as by the Short Titles Act 1896.

== 4 & 5 Will. 4 ==
The second session of the 11th Parliament of the United Kingdom, which met from 4 February 1834 until 15 August 1834.

This session was also traditionally cited as 4 & 5 Gul. 4, 4 & 5 Wm. 4 or 4 & 5 W. 4.

=== Public general acts ===
Short title	Citation	Royal assent
Long title
Regulation of Factories Act 1834 (repealed)	4 & 5 Will. 4. c. 1	20 February 1834
An Act to explain and amend an Act of the last Session of Parliament, (Note: Labour of Children, etc., in Factories Act 1833 (3 & 4 Will. 4. c. 103)) for regulating the Labour of Children and young Persons in the Mills and Factories of the United Kingdomm. (Repealed by Statute Law Revision Act 1874 (37 & 38 Vict. c. 35))
Supply Act 1834 (repealed)	4 & 5 Will. 4. c. 2	26 March 1834
An Act to apply certain Sums to the Service of the Year One thousand eight hundred and thirty-four. (Repealed by Statute Law Revision Act 1874 (37 & 38 Vict. c. 35))
Exchequer Bills Act 1834 (repealed)	4 & 5 Will. 4. c. 3	26 March 1834
An Act for raising the Sum of Fourteen Millions by Exchequer Bills, for the Service of the Year One thousand eight hundred and thirty-four. (Repealed by Statute Law Revision Act 1874 (37 & 38 Vict. c. 35))
Marine Mutiny Act 1834 (repealed)	4 & 5 Will. 4. c. 4	26 March 1834
An Act for the Regulation of His Majesty's Royal Marine Forces while on Shore. (Repealed by Statute Law Revision Act 1874 (37 & 38 Vict. c. 35))
Sugar Duties Act 1834 (repealed)	4 & 5 Will. 4. c. 5	26 March 1834
An Act for continuing to His Majesty until the Fifth Day July One thousand eight hundred and thirty-five certain Duties on Sugar imported into the United Kingdom, for the Service of the Year One thousand eight hundred and thirty-four. (Repealed by Statute Law Revision Act 1874 (37 & 38 Vict. c. 35))
Mutiny Act 1834 (repealed)	4 & 5 Will. 4. c. 6	26 March 1834
An Act for punishing Mutiny and Desertion, and for the better Payment of the Army and their Quarters. (Repealed by Statute Law Revision Act 1874 (37 & 38 Vict. c. 35))
Postage in North American Colonies Act 1834 (repealed)	4 & 5 Will. 4. c. 7	26 March 1834
An Act to repeal, at the Period within mentioned, so much of an Act passed in the Fifth Year of the Reign of His late Majesty King George the Third, (Note: Postage Act 1765 (5 Geo. 3. c. 25)) intituled "An Act to alter certain Rates of Postage, and to amend, explain, and enlarge several Provisions in an Act made in the Ninth Year of the Reign of Queen Anne, (Note: Post Office (Revenues) Act 1710 (9 Ann. c. 11)) and in other Acts relating to the Revenue of the Post Office," as authorizes the taking of certain Rates of Inland Postage within His Majesty's Dominions in North America. (Repealed by Statute Law Revision Act 1874 (37 & 38 Vict. c. 35))
Juries (Ireland) Act 1834 (repealed)	4 & 5 Will. 4. c. 8	26 March 1834
An Act to amend an Act passed in the last Session, for consolidating and amending the Laws relative to Jurors and Juries in Ireland. (Repealed by Juries Act (Ireland) 1871 (34 & 35 Vict. c. 65))
Indemnity Act 1834 (repealed)	4 & 5 Will. 4. c. 9	26 March 1834
An Act to indemnify such Persons in the United Kingdom as have omitted to qualify themselves for Offices and Employments, and for extending the Time limited for those Purposes respectively until the Twenty-fifth Day of March One thousand eight hundred and thirty-five; to permit such Persons in Great Britain as have omitted to make and file Affidavits of the Execution of indentures of Clerks to Attornies and Solicitors to make and file the same on or before the First Day of Hilary Term One thousand eight hundred and thirty-five; and to allow Persons to make and file such Affidavits, although the Persons whom they served shall have neglected to take out their Annual Certificates. (Repealed by Promissory Oaths Act 1871 (34 & 35 Vict. c. 48))
Turnpike Acts Continuance Act 1834 (repealed)	4 & 5 Will. 4. c. 10	26 March 1834
An Act for continuing until the First Day of June One thousand eight hundred and thirty-six the several Acts for regulating the Turnpike Roads in Great Britain which will expire with the present or the next Session of Parliament. (Repealed by Statute Law Revision Act 1874 (37 & 38 Vict. c. 35))
Application of Interest on Contracts for Redemption of Land Tax Act 1834 (repealed)	4 & 5 Will. 4. c. 11	26 March 1834
An Act for continuing to His Majesty until the Fifth Day of July One thousand eight hundred and thirty-five certain Duties on Offices and Pensions, for the Service of the Year One thousand eight hundred and thirty-four; and to appropriate any Sums arising from the Redemption of the Land Tax. (Repealed by Statute Law Revision (No. 2) Act 1890 (53 & 54 Vict. c. 51))
Supply (No. 2) Act 1834 (repealed)	4 & 5 Will. 4. c. 12	26 March 1834
An Act to apply a Sum of Seven Millions, out of the Consolidated Fund, to the Service of the Year One thousand eight hundred and thirty-four. (Repealed by Statute Law Revision Act 1874 (37 & 38 Vict. c. 35))
Smuggling Act 1834 (repealed)	4 & 5 Will. 4. c. 13	22 May 1834
An Act to repeal so much of an Act of the last Session of Parliament, (Note: Customs, etc. (No. 3) Act 1833 (3 & 4 Will. 4. c. 53)) for the Prevention of Smuggling, as authorizes Magistrates to sentence Persons convicted of certain Offences to serve His Majesty in His Naval Service, and to alter and amend the said Act. (Repealed by Customs (Repeal) Act 1845 (8 & 9 Vict. c. 84))
Bounty on Hemp, etc., Repeal Act 1834 (repealed)	4 & 5 Will. 4. c. 14	22 May 1834
An Act to repeal so much of several Acts as authorizes the issuing any Sums of Money out of the Consolidated Fund for the Encouragement of the raising or dressing Hemp or Flax. (Repealed by Statute Law Revision Act 1874 (37 & 38 Vict. c. 35))
Office of Receipt of Exchequer Act 1834 (repealed)	4 & 5 Will. 4. c. 15	22 May 1834
An Act to regulate the Office of the Receipt of His Majesty's Exchequer at Westminster. (Repealed by Exchequer Bills and Bonds Act 1866 (29 & 30 Vict. c. 25), Exchequer and Audit Departments Act 1866 (29 & 30 Vict. c. 39) and Standards of Weights, Measures, and Coinage Act 1866 (29 & 30 Vict. c. 82))
Exchequer (Scotland) Act 1834	4 & 5 Will. 4. c. 16	22 May 1834
An Act to abolish the Office of Recorder of the Great Roll or Clerk of the Pipe in the Exchequer in Scotland.
Warwick Election Act 1834 (repealed)	4 & 5 Will. 4. c. 17	22 May 1834
An Act to indemnify Witnesses who may give Evidence before the Lords Spiritual and Temporal on a Bill for preventing Bribery and Corruption and illegal Practices in the Election of Members to serve in Parliament for the Borough of Warwick. (Repealed by Statute Law Revision Act 1874 (37 & 38 Vict. c. 35))
Liverpool Election Act 1834 (repealed)	4 & 5 Will. 4. c. 18	22 May 1834
An Act to indemnify Witnesses who may give Evidence before the Lords Spiritual and Temporal on a Bill to exclude the Freemen of Liverpool from voting at the Election of Members of Parliament for that Borough. (Repealed by Statute Law Revision Act 1874 (37 & 38 Vict. c. 35))
House Tax Act 1834 (repealed)	4 & 5 Will. 4. c. 19	16 June 1834
An Act to repeal certain Duties on Inhabited Dwelling Houses. (Repealed by Statute Law Revision Act 1874 (37 & 38 Vict. c. 35), Statute Law Revision (No. 2) Act 1888 (51 & 52 Vict. c. 57) and Statute Law Revision Act 1950 (14 Geo. 6. c. 6))
Sale of Fish Act 1834 (repealed)	4 & 5 Will. 4. c. 20	16 June 1834
An Act to explain and amend an Act passed in the Thirty-third Year of the Reign of His late Majesty King George the Second, (Note: Fish Act 1759 (33 Geo. 2. c. 27)) to regulate the Conveyance and Sale of Fish at First Hand. (Repealed by Sea Fisheries Act 1868 (31 & 32 Vict. c. 45))
Hay and Straw Act 1834 (repealed)	4 & 5 Will. 4. c. 21	16 June 1834
An Act for amending certain Provisions of an Act of the Thirty-sixth of George the Third, (Note: Hay and Straw Act 1796 (36 Geo. 3. c. 88)) for regulating the buying and selling of Hay and Straw. (Repealed by Theft Act 1968 (c. 60))
Apportionment Act 1834 (repealed)	4 & 5 Will. 4. c. 22	16 June 1834
An Act to amend an Act of the Eleventh Year of King George the Second, (Note: Distress for Rent Act 1737 (11 Geo. 2. c. 19)) respecting the Apportionment of Rents, Annuities, and other periodical Payments. (Repealed by Statute Law (Repeals) Act 1977 (c. 18))
Trust Property Escheat Act 1834 (repealed)	4 & 5 Will. 4. c. 23	27 June 1834
An Act for the Amendment of the Law relative to the Escheat and Forfeiture of Real and Personal Property holden in Trust. (Repealed by Trustee Act 1850 (13 & 14 Vict. c. 60))
Superannuation Act 1834 (repealed)	4 & 5 Will. 4. c. 24	25 July 1834
An Act to alter, amend, and consolidate the Laws for regulating the Pensions, Compensations, and Allowances to be made to Persons in respect of their having held Civil Offices in His Majesty's Service. (Repealed by Superannuation Act 1965 (c. 74))
Navy Pay Act 1834 (repealed)	4 & 5 Will. 4. c. 25	25 July 1834
An Act to alter and extend the Provisions of an Act passed in the Eleventh Year of the Reign of His late Majesty King George the Fourth, (Note: Pay of the Navy Act 1830 (11 Geo. 4 & 1 Will. 4. c. 20)) for amending and consolidating the Laws relating to the Pay of the Royal Navy. (Repealed by Admiralty, &c. Acts Repeal Act 1865 (28 & 29 Vict. c. 112))
Hanging in Chains Act 1834 (repealed)	4 & 5 Will. 4. c. 26	25 July 1834
An Act to abolish the Practice of hanging the Bodies of Criminals in Chains. (Repealed by Statute Law Revision Act 1874 (37 & 38 Vict. c. 35))
Trial of Felonies in Certain Boroughs Act 1834 (repealed)	4 & 5 Will. 4. c. 27	25 July 1834
An Act for the better Administration of Justice in certain Boroughs and Franchises. (Repealed by Statute Law Revision (No. 2) Act 1888 (51 & 52 Vict. c. 57))
Marriage (Scotland) Act 1834 (repealed)	4 & 5 Will. 4. c. 28	25 July 1834
An Act to amend the Laws relative to Marriages celebrated by Roman Catholic Priests and Ministers not of the Established Church, in Scotland. (Repealed by Marriage (Scotland) Act 1977 (c. 15))
Loan by Trustees on Landed Securities (Ireland) Act 1834 (repealed)	4 & 5 Will. 4. c. 29	25 July 1834
An Act for facilitating the Loan of Money upon Landed Securities in Ireland. (Repealed by Trust Investment Act 1889 (52 & 53 Vict. c. 32))
Common Fields Exchange Act 1834 (repealed)	4 & 5 Will. 4. c. 30	25 July 1834
An Act to facilitate the Exchange of Lands lying in Common Fields. (Repealed by Commons Act 1899 (62 & 63 Vict. c. 30))
National Debt Act 1834 (repealed)	4 & 5 Will. 4. c. 31	25 July 1834
An Act for transferring certain Annuities of Four Pounds per Centum per Annum into Annuities of Three Pounds and Ten Shillings per Centum per Annum, and for providing for paying off the Persons who may dissent to such Transfer. (Repealed by Statute Law Revision Act 1870 (33 & 34 Vict. c. 69))
Tonnage Rates (Port of London) Act 1834 (repealed)	4 & 5 Will. 4. c. 32	25 July 1834
An Act for reducing the Tonnage Rates payable in the Port of London. (Repealed by Thames Conservancy Act 1894 (57 & 58 Vict. c. clxxxvii))
East India Company Act 1834 (repealed)	4 & 5 Will. 4. c. 33	25 July 1834
An Act to repeal so much of several Acts as requires Deposits to be made upon Teas sold at the Sales of the East India Company. (Repealed by Statute Law Revision Act 1874 (37 & 38 Vict. c. 35))
Greenwich Hospital Act 1834 (repealed)	4 & 5 Will. 4. c. 34	25 July 1834
An Act to repeal the Laws relating to the Contribution out of Merchant Seamen's Wages towards the Support of the Royal Naval Hospital at Greenwich, and for supplying other Funds in lieu thereof. (Repealed by Greenwich Hospital Act 1869 (32 & 33 Vict. c. 44))
Chimney Sweepers Act 1834 (repealed)	4 & 5 Will. 4. c. 35	25 July 1834
An Act for the better Regulation of Chimney Sweepers and their Apprentices, and for the safer Construction of Chimneys and Flues. (Repealed by Statute Law Revision Act 1874 (37 & 38 Vict. c. 35))
Central Criminal Court Act 1834 (repealed)	4 & 5 Will. 4. c. 36	25 July 1834
An Act for establishing a new Court for the Trial of Offences committed in the Metropolis and Parts adjoining. (Repealed by Administration of Justice Act 1964 (c. 42))
Lotteries for Improvement of Glasgow Act 1834 (repealed)	4 & 5 Will. 4. c. 37	25 July 1834
An Act to prohibit any further Lotteries under an Act passed in the First and Second Years of the Reign of His present Majesty, (Note: Glasgow Cross and Monteith Row Street Act 1831 (1 & 2 Will. 4. c. viii)) for the Improvement of Glasgow. (Repealed by Statute Law Revision Act 1874 (37 & 38 Vict. c. 35))
Local Disturbances, etc. (Ireland) Act 1834 (repealed)	4 & 5 Will. 4. c. 38	30 July 1834
An Act to continue, under certain Modifications, to the First Day of August One thousand eight hundred and thirty-five, an Act of the Third Year of His present Majesty, (Note: Local Disturbances, etc. (Ireland) Act 1833 (3 & 4 Will. 4. c. 4)) for the more effectual Suppression of local Disturbances and dangerous Associations in Ireland. (Repealed by Statute Law Revision Act 1874 (37 & 38 Vict. c. 35))
Costs in Actions of Quare Impedit Act 1834 (repealed)	4 & 5 Will. 4. c. 39	30 July 1834
An Act to give Costs in Actions of Quare impedit. (Repealed by Statute Law Revision (No. 2) Act 1888 (51 & 52 Vict. c. 57))
Friendly Societies Act 1834 (repealed)	4 & 5 Will. 4. c. 40	30 July 1834
An Act to amend an Act of the Tenth Year of His late Majesty King George the Fourth, (Note: Friendly Societies Act 1829 (10 Geo. 4. c. 56)) to consolidate and amend the Laws relating to Friendly Societies. (Repealed by Friendly Societies Act 1855 (18 & 19 Vict. c. 63))
New Churches (Scotland) Act 1834 (repealed)	4 & 5 Will. 4. c. 41	30 July 1834
An Act to regulate the Appointment of Ministers to Churches in Scotland erected by voluntary contribution. (Repealed by Abolition of Feudal Tenure etc. (Scotland) Act 2000 (asp 5))
Stannaries Court of Cornwall Act 1834 (repealed)	4 & 5 Will. 4. c. 42	30 July 1834
An Act to facilitate the taking of Affidavits and Affirmations in the Court of the Vice-Warden of the Stannaries of Cornwall. (Repealed by Commissioners for Oaths Act 1889 (52 & 53 Vict. c. 10))
Justices' Qualification (Scilly Islands) Act 1834 (repealed)	4 & 5 Will. 4. c. 43	13 August 1834
An Act to authorize Persons duly appointed to act as Justices of the Peace in the Islands of Scilly, although not qualified according to Law. (Repealed by Statute Law Revision Act 1960 (8 & 9 Eliz. 2. c. 56))
Postage Act 1834 (repealed)	4 & 5 Will. 4. c. 44	13 August 1834
An Act to regulate the Conveyance of printed Newspapers by Post between the United Kingdom, the British Colonies, and Foreign Parts. (Repealed by Post Office (Repeal of Laws) Act 1837 (7 Will. 4 & 1 Vict. c. 32))
Superannuation Act Amendment Act 1834 (repealed)	4 & 5 Will. 4. c. 45	13 August 1834
An Act to amend an Act of the present Session, (Note: Superannuation Act 1834 (4 & 5 Will. 4. c. 24)) for altering and consolidating the Laws for regulating the Pensions and Allowances to Persons in respect of their having held Civil Offices in His Majesty's Service. (Repealed by Statute Law Revision Act 1874 (37 & 38 Vict. c. 35))
Fever Hospitals (Ireland) Act 1834 (repealed)	4 & 5 Will. 4. c. 46	13 August 1834
An Act to amend an Act passed in the Fifty-eighth Year of King George the Third, for establishing Fever Hospitals, and to make other Regulations for Relief of the suffering Poor, and for preventing the Increase of Infectious Fevers, in Ireland. (Repealed by Statute Law Revision (No. 2) Act 1888 (51 & 52 Vict. c. 57), Statute Law Revision (No. 2) Act 1890 (53 & 54 Vict. c. 51) and Health Services Act (Northern Ireland) 1948 (c. 3 (N.I.)))
April Quarter Sessions Act 1834 (repealed)	4 & 5 Will. 4. c. 47	13 August 1834
An Act for preventing the Interference of the Spring Assizes with the April Quarter Sessions. (Repealed by Quarter Sessions Act 1894 (57 & 58 Vict. c. 6))
County Rates Act 1834 (repealed)	4 & 5 Will. 4. c. 48	13 August 1834
An Act to regulate the Expenditure of County Rates and Funds in aid thereof. (Repealed by County Rates Act 1852 (15 & 16 Vict. c. 81))
Weights and Measures Act 1834 (repealed)	4 & 5 Will. 4. c. 49	13 August 1834
An Act to amend and render more effectual Two Acts of the Fifth (Note: Weights and Measures Act 1824 (5 Geo. 4. c. 74)) and Sixth (Note: Weights and Measures Act 1825 (6 Geo. 4. c. 12)) Years of the Reign of His late Majesty King George the Fourth, relating to Weights and Measures. (Repealed by Weights and Measures Act 1835 (5 & 6 Will. 4. c. 63))
Irish Roads Act 1834 (repealed)	4 & 5 Will. 4. c. 50	13 August 1834
An Act to amend an Act passed in the Forty-ninth Year of the Reign of King George the Third, (Note: Highways (Ireland) Act 1809 (49 Geo. 3. c. 84)) for amending the Irish Road Acts. (Repealed by Summary Jurisdiction (Ireland) Act 1850 (13 & 14 Vict. c. 102))
Excise Management Act 1834 (repealed)	4 & 5 Will. 4. c. 51	13 August 1834
An Act to amend the Laws relating to the Collection and Management of the Revenue of Excise. (Repealed by Customs and Excise Act 1952 (15 & 16 Geo. 6 & 1 Eliz. 2. c. 44))
Merchant Seaman's Widows, etc. Act 1834 (repealed)	4 & 5 Will. 4. c. 52	13 August 1834
An Act to amend an Act of the Twentieth Year of His Majesty King George the Second, (Note: Merchant Seamen Act 1746 (20 Geo. 2. c. 38)) for the Relief and Support of sick, maimed, and disabled Seamen, and the Widows and Children of such as shall be killed, slain, or drowned in the Merchant Service; and for other Purposes. (Repealed by Seamen's Fund Winding-up Act 1851 (14 & 15 Vict. c. 102) and Merchant Shipping Repeal Act 1854 (17 & 18 Vict. c. 120))
Arms and Gunpowder (Ireland) Act 1834 (repealed)	4 & 5 Will. 4. c. 53	13 August 1834
An Act to continue for One Year, and from thence to the End of the then next Session of Parliament, several Acts relating to the Importation and keeping of Arms and Gunpowder in Ireland. (Repealed by Statute Law Revision Act 1874 (37 & 38 Vict. c. 35))
Assessed Taxes Act 1834 (repealed)	4 & 5 Will. 4. c. 54	13 August 1834
An Act to continue for Five Years, from the Fifth Day of April One thousand eight hundred and thirty-five, and to amend, the Acts for authorizing a Composition for Assessed Taxes. (Repealed by Revenue Act 1869 (32 & 33 Vict. c. 14))
Valuation (Ireland) Act 1834 (repealed)	4 & 5 Will. 4. c. 55	13 August 1834
An Act to amend Three Acts, made respectively in the Seventh Year of the Reign of His late Majesty King George the Fourth, (Note: Valuation of Lands (Ireland) Act 1826 (7 Geo. 4. c. 62)) and in the First and Second Years (Note: Valuation of Lands (Ireland) Act 1831 (1 & 2 Will. 4. c. 51)) and in the Second and Third Years (Note: Valuation of Lands (Ireland) Act 1832 (2 & 3 Will. 4. c. 73)) of the Reign of His present Majesty, for the uniform Valuation of Lands and Tenements in the several Baronies, Parishes, and other Divisions of Counties in Ireland; and to provide for the more effectual Levy of Grand Jury Cess. (Repealed by Statute Law Revision Act 1874 (37 & 38 Vict. c. 35))
Insolvent Debtors (Ireland) Act 1834 (repealed)	4 & 5 Will. 4. c. 56	13 August 1834
An Act to continue for One Year, and from thence to the End of the then next Session of Parliament, the Acts for the Relief of Insolvent Debtors in Ireland. (Repealed by Statute Law Revision Act 1874 (37 & 38 Vict. c. 35))
Stamps Act 1834 (repealed)	4 & 5 Will. 4. c. 57	13 August 1834
An Act to repeal the Stamp Duties on Almanacks and Directories, and to give other Relief with gelation to the Stamp Duties in Great Britain and Ireland respectively. (Repealed by Inland Revenue Repeal Act 1870 (33 & 34 Vict. c. 99))
Exchequer Bills (No. 2) Act 1834 (repealed)	4 & 5 Will. 4. c. 58	13 August 1834
An Act for raising the Sum of Fourteen millions three hundred and eighty-four thousand seven hundred Pounds by Exchequer Bills, for the Service of the Year One thousand eight hundred and thirty-four. (Repealed by Statute Law Revision Act 1874 (37 & 38 Vict. c. 35))
Forest of Dean Boundary Commission, etc. Act 1834 (repealed)	4 & 5 Will. 4. c. 59	13 August 1834
An Act to extend the Term of an Act of the First and Second Years of His present Majesty, (Note: Forest of Dean commissioners, etc. Act 1831 (1 & 2 Will. 4. c. 12)) for ascertaining the Boundaries of the Forest of Dean, and for inquiring into the Rights and Privileges claimed by Free Miners of the Hundred of Saint Briavel's, to the Twenty-first Day of January One thousand eight hundred and thirty-five, and from thence to the End of the then next Session of Parliament. (Repealed by Statute Law Revision Act 1874 (37 & 38 Vict. c. 35))
Land Tax Act 1834 (repealed)	4 & 5 Will. 4. c. 60	13 August 1834
An Act to amend the Laws relating to the Land and Assessed Taxes, and to consolidate the Boards of Stamps and Taxes. (Repealed by Finance Act 1949 (12, 13 & 14 Geo. 6. c. 47))
Bridges (Ireland) Act 1834 (repealed)	4 & 5 Will. 4. c. 61	13 August 1834
An Act for the more effectually providing for the Erection of certain Bridges in Ireland. (Repealed for Northern Ireland by Local Government (Modifications and Repeals) Order (Northern Ireland) 1973 (SR&O(NI) 1973/285))
Court of Common Pleas of Lancaster Act 1834 (repealed)	4 & 5 Will. 4. c. 62	13 August 1834
An Act for improving the Practice and Proceedings in the Court of Common Pleas of the County Palatine of Lancaster. (Repealed by Civil Procedure Acts Repeal Act 1879 (42 & 43 Vict. c. 59))
Militia Pay Act 1834 (repealed)	4 & 5 Will. 4. c. 63	13 August 1834
An Act to defray the Charge of the Pay, Clothing, and contingent and other Expences of the Disembodied Militia in Great Britain and Ireland; and to grant Allowances in certain Cases to Subaltern Officers, Adjutants, Paymasters, Quartermasters, Surgeons, Assistant Surgeons, Surgeons Mates, and Serjeant Majors of the Militia, until the First Day of July One thousand eight hundred and thirty-five. (Repealed by Statute Law Revision Act 1874 (37 & 38 Vict. c. 35))
Militia Ballots Suspension Act 1834 (repealed)	4 & 5 Will. 4. c. 64	13 August 1834
An Act to suspend until the End of the next Session of Parliament the making of Lists and the Ballots and Enrolments for the Militia of the United Kingdom. (Repealed by Statute Law Revision Act 1874 (37 & 38 Vict. c. 35))
Norfolk Island Act 1834 (repealed)	4 & 5 Will. 4. c. 65	13 August 1834
An Act for the more effectual Administration of Justice at Norfolk Island. (Repealed by Statute Law Revision (No. 2) Act 1890 (53 & 54 Vict. c. 51))
Menai and Conway Bridges Act 1834 (repealed)	4 & 5 Will. 4. c. 66	13 August 1834
An Act for empowering the Commissioners of His Majesty's Woods, Forests, Land Revenues, Works, and Buildings to pay the Net Proceeds of the Tolls of the Menai and Conway Bridges into the Receipt of His Majesty's Exchequer at Westminster, to the Account of the Consolidated Fund. (Repealed by Statute Law (Repeals) Act 2013 (c. 2))
Transportation Act 1834 (repealed)	4 & 5 Will. 4. c. 67	13 August 1834
An Act for abolishing Capital Punishment in base of returning from Transportation. (Repealed for England and Wales by Criminal Justice Act 1948 (11 & 12 Geo. 6. c. 58), for Scotland by Criminal Justice (Scotland) Act 1949 (12, 13 & 14 Geo. 6. c. 94) and for Northern Ireland by Statute Law Revision (No. 2) Act 1888 (51 & 52 Vict. c. 57), Statute Law Revision Act 1892 (55 & 56 Vict. c. 19) and Criminal Justice Act (Northern Ireland) 1953 (c. 14 (N.I.)))
Court of Justice (Ireland) Act 1834 (repealed)	4 & 5 Will. 4. c. 68	13 August 1834
An Act to authorize an Advance out of the General Fund of Monies belonging to the Suitors of the Courts of Chancery and Exchequer in Ireland, towards the purchasing of Ground, and building thereon Offices necessary to the Courts of Justice in Dublin. (Repealed by Statute Law Revision Act 1874 (37 & 38 Vict. c. 35))
Mumbles Head Lighthouse Act 1834 (repealed)	4 & 5 Will. 4. c. 69	13 August 1834
An Act for placing the Mumbles Head Lighthouse in the County of Glamorgan under the Management of the Corporation of the Trinity House of Deptford Strond. (Repealed by Statute Law Revision Act 1874 (37 & 38 Vict. c. 35))
House of Commons Officers Act 1834 (repealed)	4 & 5 Will. 4. c. 70	13 August 1834
An Act to regulate the Salaries of the Officers of the House of Commons, and to abolish the Sinecure Offices of Principal Committee Clerks and Clerks of Ingrossments. (Repealed by House of Commons (Administration) Act 1978 (c. 36))
Printers, etc., of Newspapers (Ireland) Act 1834 (repealed)	4 & 5 Will. 4. c. 71	13 August 1834
An Act to repeal certain Provisions of Two Acts of His Majesty King George the Third (Note: Freedom of the Press Act 1798 (38 Geo. 3. c. 7 (I))) (Note: Stamps (Ireland) (No. 3) Act 1815 (55 Geo. 3. c. 80)) affecting the Printers, Publishers, and Proprietors of Newspapers in Ireland. (Repealed by Statute Law Revision Act 1874 (37 & 38 Vict. c. 35))
Advances for Public Works Act 1834 (repealed)	4 & 5 Will. 4. c. 72	14 August 1834
An Act to amend several Acts for authorizing the Issue of Exchequer Bills for carrying on Public Works and Fisheries and Employment of the Poor; and to authorize a further Issue of Exchequer Bills for the Purposes of the said Acts. (Repealed by Public Works Loans Act 1875 (38 & 39 Vict. c. 89))
Assessed Taxes (No. 2) Act 1834 (repealed)	4 & 5 Will. 4. c. 73	14 August 1834
An Act to grant Relief from the Duties of Assessed Taxes in certain Cases. (Repealed by Statute Law Revision Act 1874 (37 & 38 Vict. c. 35))
Payment of Creditors (Scotland) Act 1834 (repealed)	4 & 5 Will. 4. c. 74	14 August 1834
An Act to continue until the Fifth Day of March One thousand eight hundred and thirty-five, and from thence to the End of the then next Session of Parliament, an Act of the Fifty-fourth Year of His Majesty King George the Third, (Note: Payment of Creditors (Scotland) Act 1814 (54 Geo. 3. c. 137)) for rendering the Payment of Creditors more equal and expeditious in Scotland. (Repealed by Statute Law Revision Act 1874 (37 & 38 Vict. c. 35))
Excise Act 1834 (repealed)	4 & 5 Will. 4. c. 75	14 August 1834
An Act to repeal the Duties on Spirits made in Ireland; and to impose other Duties in lieu thereof; and to impose additional Duties on Licences to Retailers of Spirits in the United Kingdom. (Repealed by Statute Law Revision Act 1874 (37 & 38 Vict. c. 35), Finance (1909-10) Act 1910 (10 Edw. 7 & 1 Geo. 5. c. 8) and Statute Law Revision Act 1950 (14 Geo. 6. c. 6))
Poor Law Amendment Act 1834 or the New Poor Law (repealed)	4 & 5 Will. 4. c. 76	14 August 1834
An Act for the Amendment and better Administration of the Laws relating to the Poor in England. (Repealed by Statute Law Revision Act 1966 (c. 5))
Retail of Sweets, etc. Act 1834 (repealed)	4 & 5 Will. 4. c. 77	14 August 1834
An Act for repealing the Duties on Starch, Stone Bottles, Sweets or Made Wines, Mead or Metheglin, and on Scaleboard made from Wood. (Repealed by Revenue Act 1889 (52 & 53 Vict. c. 42))
Chancery (Ireland) Act 1834 (repealed)	4 & 5 Will. 4. c. 78	14 August 1834
An Act for the Amendment of the Proceedings and Practice of the High Court of Chancery in Ireland. (Repealed by Judicature (Northern Ireland) Act 1978 (c. 23))
Insolvent Debtors, India Act 1834 (repealed)	4 & 5 Will. 4. c. 79	14 August 1834
An Act to amend the Law relating to Insolvent Debtors in India. (Repealed by Indian Insolvency Act 1848 (11 & 12 Vict. c. 21))
National Debt (No. 2) Act 1834 (repealed)	4 & 5 Will. 4. c. 80	14 August 1834
An Act to provide for the Repayment to the Governor and Company of the Bank of England of One Fourth Part of the Debt due from the Public to the said Company, in pursuance of an Act passed in the last Session of Parliament. (Note: Bank of England Act 1833 (3 & 4 Will. 4. c. 98)) (Repealed by Statute Law Revision Act 1870 (33 & 34 Vict. c. 69))
Turnpike Tolls (Allowance of Wagon Weights) Act 1834 (repealed)	4 & 5 Will. 4. c. 81	15 August 1834
An Act to amend an Act of the Third Year of King George the Fourth, (Note: Turnpike Roads Act 1822 (3 Geo. 4. c. 126)) for regulating Turnpike Roads in England, so far as the same relates to the Weights to be carried upon Waggons with Springs. (Repealed by Statute Law (Repeals) Act 1981 (c. 19))
Service of Process out of the Jurisdiction England and Ireland Act 1834 (repealed)	4 & 5 Will. 4. c. 82	15 August 1834
An Act to amend and extend an Act of the Second Year of His present Majesty, (Note: Service of Process out of the Jurisdiction (England and Ireland) Act 1832 (2 & 3 Will. 4. c. 33)) to effectuate the Service of Process issuing from the Courts of Chancery and Exchequer in England and Ireland. (Repealed by Statute Law Revision Act 1890 (53 & 54 Vict. c. 33))
Tithes Prescription Act 1834 (repealed)	4 & 5 Will. 4. c. 83	15 August 1834
An Act to amend an Act passed in the Third Year of His present Majesty, intituled "An Act for shortening the Time required in Claims of Modus Decimandi, or Exemption from or Discharge of Tithes." (Note: Tithe Act 1832 (2 & 3 Will. 4. c. 100)) (Repealed by Statute Law Revision Act 1874 (37 & 38 Vict. c. 35))
Appropriation Act 1834 (repealed)	4 & 5 Will. 4. c. 84	15 August 1834
An Act to apply a Sum of Money out of the Consolidated Fund and the Surplus of Grants to the Service of the Year One thousand eight hundred and thirty-four, and to appropriate the Supplies granted in this Session of Parliament. (Repealed by Statute Law Revision Act 1874 (37 & 38 Vict. c. 35))
Beerhouse Act 1834 (repealed)	4 & 5 Will. 4. c. 85	15 August 1834
An Act to amend an Act passed in the First Year of His present Majesty, (Note: Beerhouse Act 1830 (11 Geo. 4 & 1 Will. 4. c. 64)) to permit the general Sale of Beer and Cider by Retail in England. (Repealed by Customs and Excise Act 1952 (15 & 16 Geo. 6 & 1 Eliz. 2. c. 44))
Burghs, etc. (Scotland) Act 1834 (repealed)	4 & 5 Will. 4. c. 86	15 August 1834
An Act to explain certain Provisions in an Act of the Third and Fourth Years of His present Majesty, (Note: Parliamentary Burghs (Scotland) Act 1833 (3 & 4 Will. 4. c. 77)) to provide for the Election of Magistrates and Councillors for the several Burghs and Towns of Scotland which now return or contribute to return Members to Parliament, and are not Royal Burghs. (Repealed by Ballot Act 1872 (35 & 36 Vict. c. 33))
Royal Burghs, etc. (Scotland) Act 1834 (repealed)	4 & 5 Will. 4. c. 87	15 August 1834
An Act to explain certain Provisions of an Act of the Third and Fourth Years of the Reign of His present Majesty, (Note: Royal Burghs (Scotland) Act 1833 (3 & 4 Will. 4. c. 76)) to alter and amend the Laws for the Election of the Magistrates and Councils of the Royal Burghs in Scotland. (Repealed by Ballot Act 1872 (35 & 36 Vict. c. 33))
Parliamentary Elections (Scotland) Act 1834 (repealed)	4 & 5 Will. 4. c. 88	15 August 1834
An Act for the more effectual Registration of Persons entitled to vote in the Election of Members to serve in Parliament in Scotland. (Repealed by Ballot Act 1872 (35 & 36 Vict. c. 33))
Customs Act 1834 (repealed)	4 & 5 Will. 4. c. 89	15 August 1834
An Act to amend the Laws relating to the Customs. (Repealed by Statute Law Revision Act 1861 (24 & 25 Vict. c. 101))
Church Temporalities Act 1834	4 & 5 Will. 4. c. 90	15 August 1834
An Act to amend an Act made in the Third and Fourth Year of the Reign of His present Majesty, intituled "An Act to alter and amend the Laws relating to the Temporalities of the Church of Ireland." (Note: Church Temporalities (Ireland) Act 1833 (3 & 4 Will. 4. c. 37))
Turnpike Roads (Ireland) Act 1834 (repealed)	4 & 5 Will. 4. c. 91	15 August 1834
An Act to continue for One Year, and from thence to the End of the then next Session of Parliament, the several Acts for regulating the Turnpike Roads which will expire during the present or before the End of the next Session of Parliament, and to amend the several Acts regulating the Post Roads, in Ireland. (Repealed by Statute Law Revision Act 1874 (37 & 38 Vict. c. 35))
Fines and Recoveries (Ireland) Act 1834	4 & 5 Will. 4. c. 92	15 August 1834
An Act for the Abolition of Fines, and Recoveries, and for the Substitution of more simple Modes of Assurance, in Ireland.
Summary Convictions (Ireland) Act 1834 (repealed)	4 & 5 Will. 4. c. 93	15 August 1834
An Act to amend the Laws relating to Appeals against summary Convictions before Justices of the Peace in Ireland. (Repealed by Statute Law Revision Act 1874 (37 & 38 Vict. c. 35))
Grants of Privileges to Companies Act 1834 or the Trading Companies Act 1834 (repealed)	4 & 5 Will. 4. c. 94	15 August 1834
An Act to enable His Majesty to invest trading and other Companies with the Powers necessary for the due Conduct of their Affairs, and for the Security of the Rights and Interests of their Creditors. (Repealed by Chartered Companies Act 1837 (7 Will. 4 & 1 Vict. c. 73))
South Australia Act 1834 (repealed)	4 & 5 Will. 4. c. 95	15 August 1834
An Act to empower His Majesty to erect South Australia into a British Province or Provinces and to provide for the Colonization and Government thereof. (Repealed by South Australia Act 1842 (5 & 6 Vict. c. 61))
Bayswater Sewer Act 1834	4 & 5 Will. 4. c. 96	13 August 1834
An Act to enable the Commissioners of Sewers for the City and Liberty of Westminster and Part of the County of Middlesex to make a new Sewer at Bayswater in the County of Middlesex.

=== Local acts ===
Short title	Citation	Royal assent
Long title
Liverpool Oil Gaslight Company Act 1834 (repealed)	4 & 5 Will. 4. c. i	26 March 1834
An Act to empower the Liverpool Oil Gas Light Company to produce Gas from Coal and other Materials, and to amend the Act (Note: Liverpool Gas Act 1823 (4 Geo. 4. c. xxxix)) relating to the said Company. (Repealed by Liverpool United Gaslight Company's Act 1848 (11 & 12 Vict. c. xxxviii))
Bristol and Gloucester Railway Act 1834	4 & 5 Will. 4. c. ii	26 March 1834
An Act to alter, amend, and enlarge the Powers of an Act Passed in the Ninth Year of the Reign of His late Majesty King George the Fourth, intituled "An Act for making and maintaining a Railway or Tramroad from or near the City of Bristol to Coalpit Heath in the Parish of Westerleigh in the County of Gloucester." (Note: Bristol and Gloucester Railway Act 1828 (9 Geo. 4. c. xciii))
St. Helens and Runcorn Gap Railway Act 1834	4 & 5 Will. 4. c. iii	26 March 1834
An Act to enlarge and amend the Powers and Provisions of an Act (Note: St. Helens and Runcorn Gap Railway Act 1830 (11 Geo. 4. c. lxi)) relating to the Saint Helen's and Runcorn Gap Railway Company.
Gosport and Haslar Bridge Act 1834	4 & 5 Will. 4. c. iv	26 March 1834
An Act for building a Bridge over Stoke otherwise Haslar Lake, which separates Gosport from Haslar, both in the Parish of Alverstoke in the County of Southampton, and for making Approaches thereto.
Sculcoates Rates Act 1834 (repealed)	4 & 5 Will. 4. c. v	26 March 1834
An Act for better assessing the Poor and other Rates on small Tenements within the Parish of Sculcoates in the East Riding of the County of York. (Repealed by Statute Law (Repeals) Act 2008 (c. 12))
Liverpool Rates Act 1834 (repealed)	4 & 5 Will. 4. c. vi	26 March 1834
An Act to repeal an Act passed for better assessing and recovering the Poor and other Rates upon small Tenements within the Parish of Liverpool in the County Palatine of Lancaster. (Repealed by Statute Law (Repeals) Act 2008 (c. 12))
Lambeth Waterworks Act 1834 (repealed)	4 & 5 Will. 4. c. vii	26 March 1834
An Act to alter, amend, enlarge, and extend the Powers and Provisions of an Act (Note: Lambeth Waterworks Act 1785 (25 Geo. 3. c. 89)) for enabling the Company of Proprietors of Lambeth Waterworks to supply the Inhabitants of the Parish of Lambeth and Parts adjacent in the County of Surrey with Water. (Repealed by Lambeth Waterworks Act 1848 (11 & 12 Vict. c. vii))
Exeter Markets Act 1834 (repealed)	4 & 5 Will. 4. c. viii	26 March 1834
An Act for removing the Markets held in the Sigh and Fore Street and other Places within the City of Exeter, and for providing other Markets in lieu thereof. (Repealed by Exeter City Council Act 1987 (c. xi) (Note: Incorrectly cited as "Exeter City Council 1987 (c.viii)" in the Chronological Table of Local Acts.))
Ocean Assurance Company Act 1834	4 & 5 Will. 4. c. ix	26 March 1834
An Act for enabling the Ocean Assurance Company to sue and be sued in the Name of the Chairman for the Time being, or of any One of the Directors of the said Company.
Roads from Henfield Act 1834	4 & 5 Will. 4. c. x	26 March 1834
An Act for more effectually repairing and maintaining the Road from Crouch Hill in the Parish of Henfield to Ubley's Corner in the Parish of Albourne, and from the King's Head Inn in Albourne, through the Town of Hurstperpoint, to the Cross Roads in the Town of Ditcheling; and also for making and maintaining a Branch of Road from the Town of Hurstperpoint to Poynings Common, all in the County of Sussex.
Minsterly and Churchstoke Turnpike Road (Salop., Montgomery) Act 1834	4 & 5 Will. 4. c. xi	26 March 1834
An Act for making a Turnpike Road from Minsterley in the County of Salop to the Turnpike Road leading from Bishop's Castle in the said County of Salop to Churchstoke in the County of Montgomery.
Calder and Hebble Navigation Act 1834	4 & 5 Will. 4. c. xii	22 May 1834
An Act to enable the Company of Proprietors of the Colder and Hebble Navigation to improve their Navigation, and to amend the Acts relating thereto.
London Bridge Approaches Act 1834	4 & 5 Will. 4. c. xiii	22 May 1834
An Act for extending the Approaches to London Bridge, and amending the Acts relating thereto.
New Brunswick and Nova Scotia Land Company Act 1834	4 & 5 Will. 4. c. xiv	22 May 1834
An Act for granting certain Powers to the New Brunswick and Nova Scotia Land Company.
British American Land Company Act 1834	4 & 5 Will. 4. c. xv	22 May 1834
An Act for granting certain Powers to "The British American Land Company."
Dorchester Improvement Act 1834	4 & 5 Will. 4. c. xvi	22 May 1834
An Act for better paving, cleansing, lighting, watching, watering, and otherwise improving the Streets and other public Passages and Places within the Borough of Dorchester in the County of Dorset, and the Tithing of Colliton Row in the Town of Dorchester aforesaid.
Limerick Water Act 1834	4 & 5 Will. 4. c. xvii	22 May 1834
An Act to alter, amend, and enlarge the Powers of an Act passed in the Sixth Year of the Reign of His late Majesty King George the Fourth, intituled "An Act for supplying the City and Suburbs of Limerick in the County of the City of Limerick with Water." (Note: Limerick Water Act 1825 (6 Geo. 4. c. clxxii))
Newcastle-upon-Tyne Water Act 1834 (repealed)	4 & 5 Will. 4. c. xviii	22 May 1834
An Act for better supplying with Water the Town and County of the Town of Newcastle-upon-Tyne, and the Neighbourhood thereof. (Repealed by Whittle Dean Waterworks Act 1854 (17 & 18 Vict. c. lx))
Bute Ship Canal Act 1834	4 & 5 Will. 4. c. xix	22 May 1834
An Act to alter, amend, and enlarge the Powers of an Act passed in the First Year of the Reign of His present Majesty King William the Fourth, intituled "An Act for empowering the Marquis of Bute to make and maintain a Ship Canal commencing near the Mouth of the River Taff in the County of Glamorgan, and terminating near the Town of Cardiff, with other Works to communicate therewith." (Note: Bute Ship Canal Act 1830 (11 Geo. 4 & 1 Will. 4. c. cxxxiii))
Montgomeryshire Canal Company Act 1834	4 & 5 Will. 4. c. xx	22 May 1834
An Act for enabling the Company of Proprietors of the Western Branch of the Montgomeryshire Canal to effect an Agreement with William Pugh of Bryn Llywarch in the County of Montgomery, Esquire; and for securing certain Monies advanced and paid by the said William Pugh and others to or for the Use of the said Company.
Birmingham and Liverpool Junction Canal Navigation Company Act 1834 (repealed)	4 & 5 Will. 4. c. xxi	22 May 1834
An Act to enable the Birmingham and Liverpool Junction Canal Navigation Company to raise a further Sum of Money. (Repealed by Ellesmere and Chester Canal Company Act 1845 (8 & 9 Vict. c. ii))
Folly Bridge (Oxford) Act 1834	4 & 5 Will. 4. c. xxii	22 May 1834
An Act to continue the Term and to alter and amend the Powers of an Act passed in the Fifty-fifth Year of the Reign of His Majesty King George the Third, (Note: Folly Bridge, Oxford, Rebuilding Act 1815 (55 Geo. 3. c. xciv)) for taking down and rebuilding Folly Bridge otherwise Friars Bridge, across the River Isis, in or near the City of Oxford.
United Parishes of St. John the Baptist and St. Benedict (Glastonbury) Act 1834	4 & 5 Will. 4. c. xxiii	22 May 1834
An Act for uniting into One Parish the Parishes of Saint John the Baptist and Saint Benedict in the Town of Glastonbury in the County of Somerset.
Cambridge Gas Light Company Act 1834 (repealed)	4 & 5 Will. 4. c. xxiv	22 May 1834
An Act to incorporate a Company for better supplying with Gas the Town of Cambridge in the County of Cambridge. (Repealed by Cambridge University and Town Gas Act 1867 (30 & 31 Vict. c. lxxvii))
North Union Railway Act 1834 or the North Union Railway Company Act 1834 or the Preston and Wigan Railway Act 1834	4 & 5 Will. 4. c. xxv	22 May 1834
An Act for uniting the Wigan Branch Railway Company and the Preston and Wigan Railway Company; for authorizing an Alteration to be made in the Line of the last-mentioned Railway; and for repealing, altering, and amending the Acts relating to the said Railways.
Blaydon, Gateshead and Hebburn Railway Company Act 1834	4 & 5 Will. 4. c. xxvi	22 May 1834
An Act for making and maintaining a Railway from Blaydon to Hebburn, with Six Branches thereout, all within the County Palatine of Durham.
Dublin and Kingstown Railway Act 1834	4 & 5 Will. 4. c. xxvii	22 May 1834
An Act for enabling the Dublin and Kingstown Railway Company to make an Extension of their present Line of Railway, and for altering and amending the Act (Note: Dublin and Kingstown Railway Act 1831 (1 & 2 Will. 4. c. lxix)) for making the said Railway.
Road from Coleshill through Lichfield, and Rugeley and Alrewas Road Act 1834	4 & 5 Will. 4. c. xxviii	22 May 1834
An Act for repairing and improving the Second District of the Road from Coleshill, through the City of Lichfield and the Town of Stone, to the End of the County of Stafford in the Road leading towards Chester, and making a new Branch thereto; and also to annex to and consolidate therewith the Turnpike Road from Rugeley, through Armitage, to Alrewas in the County of Stafford.
Yarmouth Bridge and Gorleston Road (Suffolk) Act 1834 (repealed)	4 & 5 Will. 4. c. xxix	22 May 1834
An Act for more effectually amending, widening, and repairing the Road from Yarmouth Bridge, through the Hamlet of Southtown otherwise Little Yarmouth, to Gorleston in the County of Suffolk. (Repealed by Statute Law (Repeals) Act 2008 (c. 12))
Livingston and Glasgow Road Act 1834 (repealed)	4 & 5 Will. 4. c. xxx	22 May 1834
An Act for the better Maintenance, Improvement, and Repair of the Road from Livingston, by Shotts, to the City of Glasgow, and the making and maintaining certain Roads connected therewith. (Repealed by Glasgow, Parkhead and Woodend Turnpike Roads Act 1845 (8 & 9 Vict. c. xiv))
Montgomery, Merioneth, Salop. and Denbigh Roads Act 1834	4 & 5 Will. 4. c. xxxi	22 May 1834
An Act for improving and maintaining certain Roads in the Counties of Montgomery, Merioneth, Salop, and Denbigh.
Leeds and Homefield Lane End Road Act 1834	4 & 5 Will. 4. c. xxxii	22 May 1834
An Act for repairing and maintaining the Road from Quebec in the Parish of Leeds in the West Riding of the County of York to Homefield Lane End in the same Parish, with a Bridge or Bridges on the Line of such Road; and for making and maintaining certain Branch Roads to communicate therewith.
Bridgwater Gas Act 1834 (repealed)	4 & 5 Will. 4. c. xxxiii	22 May 1834
An Act for lighting with Gas the Town or Borough of Bridgwater in the County of Somerset, and Suburbs of the said Town or Borough. (Repealed by Bridgwater Gas Act 1903 (3 Edw. 7. c. xix))
Alliance Marine Assurance Company Act 1834	4 & 5 Will. 4. c. xxxiv	22 May 1834
An Act to repeal an Act passed in the Sixth Year of the Reign of His late Majesty King George the Fourth, intituled "An Act for enabling the Alliance Marine Assurance Company to sue and be sued in the Name of the Chairman for the Time being, or of any other Member of the Company," (Note: Alliance Marine Assurance Company Act 1825 (6 Geo. 4. c. ccii)) and for granting certain Powers to the said Company instead thereof.
United Kingdom Life Assurance Company Act 1834	4 & 5 Will. 4. c. xxxv	16 June 1834
An Act to enable the Proprietors or Shareholders in a Company or Association styled "The United Kingdom Life Assurance Company" to sue and be sued in the Name of One of their Directors, or Secretary.
Suffolk and General Country Amicable Insurance Office Act 1834 (repealed)	4 & 5 Will. 4. c. xxxvi	16 June 1834
An Act to enable "The Suffolk and General Country Amicable Insurance Office" to sue and be sued in the Name of One of their Treasurers, or of any One of their Directors, and for other Purposes relating thereto. (Repealed by Alliance Assurance Company's Act 1886 (49 & 50 Vict. c. lxxiv))
West of England Fire and Life Assurance Company Act 1834	4 & 5 Will. 4. c. xxxvii	16 June 1834
An Act to amend an Act of the fifty-fourth Year of King George the Third, (Note: West of England Fire and Life Insurance Company Act 1813 (54 Geo. 3. c. x)) for enabling "The West of England Fire and Life Insurance Company" to sue and be sued in the Name of their Secretary, and to give further Powers to the said Company.
St. George's Hospital, Hyde Park Corner Act 1834 (repealed)	4 & 5 Will. 4. c. xxxviii	16 June 1834
An Act to incorporate the Subscribers to Saint Georges Hospital at Hyde Park Corner, and for better enabling them to carry on their charitable Designs. (Repealed by Statute Law (Repeals) Act 2013 (c. 2))
Selkirkshire Roads Act 1834 (repealed)	4 & 5 Will. 4. c. xxxix	16 June 1834
An Act to alter and amend an Act of the Ninth Year of the Reign of His late Majesty, intituled "An Act for more effectually repairing several Roads leading through the County of Selkirk, and for better making and repairing the said Roads, and other Roads in the said County and in the Vicinity thereof." (Note: Selkirk Roads Act 1828 (9 Geo. 4. c. cix)) (Repealed by Selkirkshire Roads Act 1867 (30 & 31 Vict. c. xlvii))
Glamorgan, Brecon and Monmouth Court of Requests Act 1809 Repeal Act 1834 (repealed)	4 & 5 Will. 4. c. xl	16 June 1834
An Act to repeal an Act of the Forty-ninth Year of King George the Third, (Note: Glamorgan, Brecon and Monmouth Court of Requests Act 1809 (49 Geo. 3. c. cxli)) for the more easy and speedy Recovery of Small Debts within the Parish of Merthyr Tidfil and other Places therein mentioned in the Counties of Glamorgan, Brecon, and Monmouth. (Repealed by Statute Law (Repeals) Act 2013 (c. 2))
Wishaw and Coltness Railway Act 1834	4 & 5 Will. 4. c. xli	16 June 1834
An Act for extending the Time for completing the Wishaw and Coltness Railway in the County of Lanark.
Dudley Water Act 1834	4 & 5 Will. 4. c. xlii	16 June 1834
An Act for better supplying the Borough of Dudley in the County of Worcester, and the Neighbourhood thereof, with Water.
Aberavon Port and Harbour Act 1834	4 & 5 Will. 4. c. xliii	16 June 1834
An Act for improving the Port and Harbour of Aberavon in the County of Glamorgan.
Gloucester Gas Act 1834	4 & 5 Will. 4. c. xliv	16 June 1834
An Act to provide for lighting the Suburbs of the City of Gloucester with Gas.
South London Market Act 1834 (repealed)	4 & 5 Will. 4. c. xlv	16 June 1834
An Act for erecting, establishing, and maintaining a Market in the Parish of St. George the Martyr in the Borough of Southwark in the County of Surrey. (Repealed by Statute Law (Repeals) Act 2013 (c. 2))
Poole Bridge Act 1834	4 & 5 Will. 4. c. xlvi	16 June 1834
An Act for building a Bridge over the Water from the Town and County of the Town of Poole to the Parish of Hamworthy in the County of Dorset, with an Approach thereto.
Chippenham Improvement Act 1834 (repealed)	4 & 5 Will. 4. c. xlvii	16 June 1834
An Act for lighting, watching, cleansing, paving, and otherwise improving the Town of Chippenham in the County of Wilts. (Repealed by Local Government Board's Provisional Order Confirmation (No. 9) Act 1914 (4 & 5 Geo. 5. c. cxxx))
Cromarty Piers and Harbour Act 1834	4 & 5 Will. 4. c. xlviii	16 June 1834
An Act for preserving and maintaining the Piers and Harbour of Cromarty.
Monmouth Markets Act 1834	4 & 5 Will. 4. c. xlix	16 June 1834
An Act for removing the Markets held in the Town and Borough of Monmouth in the County of Monmouth, and for providing other Market Places in lieu thereof.
Staines Bridge Act 1834	4 & 5 Will. 4. c. l	16 June 1834
An Act to amend Two Acts passed in the Ninth (Note: Staines Bridge Act 1828 (9 Geo. 4. c. c)) and Tenth (Note: Staines Bridge Act 1829 (10 Geo. 4. c. xliv)) Years of His late Majesty King George the Fourth, for building a Bridge over the River Thames at Staines in the County of Middlesex, and for making proper Approaches thereto.
River Dart Navigation Act 1834 (repealed)	4 & 5 Will. 4. c. li	16 June 1834
An Act for deepening, extending, and improving the Navigation of the River Dart, from Totnes Bridge to Langham Wood Point in the County of Devon. (Repealed by River Dart Navigation Act 1962 (10 & 11 Eliz. 2. c. xlvi))
Gloucester Gas Light Company Act 1834 (repealed)	4 & 5 Will. 4. c. lii	16 June 1834
An Act for better lighting the City of Gloucester and its Suburbs with Gas, and for enlarging the Capital of the Gloucester Gas Light Company. (Repealed by Gloucester Gaslight Company's Act 1856 (19 & 20 Vict. c. cxviii))
Chard Canal Act 1834	4 & 5 Will. 4. c. liii	16 June 1834
An Act for making a navigable Canal from the Bridgewater and Taunton Canal in the Parish of Creech Saint Michael in the County of Somerset, and terminating in the Parish of Chard in the same County, with a collateral Cut therein described.
Gloucester and Berkeley Canal Act 1834	4 & 5 Will. 4. c. liv	16 June 1834
An Act to enable the Gloucester and Berkeley Canal Company to take Water from the River Froome, and to alter and enlarge the Powers of the several Acts for making and maintaining the said Canal.
Grand Junction Railway (Wolverhampton Branch) Act 1834 (repealed)	4 & 5 Will. 4. c. lv	16 June 1834
An Act to enable the Grand Junction Railway Company to alter and extend the Line of such Railway, and to make a Branch therefrom to Wolverhampton in the County of Stafford; and for other Purposes relating thereto. (Repealed by London and North Western Railway Act 1846 (9 & 10 Vict. c. cciv))
Hartlepool Dock and Railway (Durham Branch) Act 1834	4 & 5 Will. 4. c. lvi	16 June 1834
An Act to enable the Hartlepool Dock and Railway Company to make a new Branch of Railway to the City of Durham; and for amending an Act of the Second Year of His present Majesty, (Note: Hartlepool Dock and Railway Act 1832 (2 & 3 Will. 4. c. lxvii)) relative to the Hartlepool Railway.
Durham Junction Railway Act 1834	4 & 5 Will. 4. c. lvii	16 June 1834
An Act for making and maintaining a Railway from the Hartlepool Railway near to Moorsley to the Stanhope and Tyne Railroad in the Township of Usworth, all in the County of Durham.
Grosvenor Place Improvement Act 1834 (repealed)	4 & 5 Will. 4. c. lviii	16 June 1834
An Act to alter and amend an Act passed in the Seventh Year of the Reign of His late Majesty King George the Fourth, (Note: St. George Hanover Square and St. Luke Chelsea Improvement Act 1826 (7 Geo. 4. c. lviii)) for paving, lighting, watching, and otherwise improving Grosvenor Place, and several Streets and other public Places in the Parishes of Saint George Hanover Square and Saint Luke Chelsea in the County of Middlesex. (Repealed by London Government (City of Westminster) Order in Council 1901 (SR&O 1901/278))
Stafford, Church Bridge and Uttoxeter Road, and Road from Stafford to Newport (Salop.) Act 1834 (repealed)	4 & 5 Will. 4. c. lix	16 June 1834
An Act for repairing and maintaining the Road from Stafford to Church Bridge, and the Road from Stafford to Uttoxeter, in the County of Stafford, and also the Road from Stafford to Newport in the County of Salop. (Repealed by Stafford District Turnpike Roads Act 1866 (29 & 30 Vict. c. l))
Roads from Ticknall (Derbyshire, Leicestershire) Act 1834 (repealed)	4 & 5 Will. 4. c. lx	16 June 1834
An Act for more effectually repairing certain Roads from Scaddow Gate in the Parish of Ticknull to the Burton-upon-Trent and Ashby Road, and for making new Branches of Road, in the Counties of Derby and Leicester. (Repealed by Moira and Gresley Road Act 1864 (27 & 28 Vict. c. lxx))
Roads and Bridges in Dumbarton and Stirling Act 1834	4 & 5 Will. 4. c. lxi	16 June 1834
An Act for more effectually making, amending, widening, repairing, and maintaining certain Roads and Bridges in the Counties of Dumbarton and Stirling.
Brighthelmston, Hove and Preston Water Act 1834 (repealed)	4 & 5 Will. 4. c. lxii	16 June 1834
An Act for supplying with Water the Inhabitants of the Town and Parish of Brighthelmston, (Note: Brighthelmston is now known as Brighton.) and the Parishes of Hove and Preston, in the County of Sussex. (Repealed by Brighton, Hove and Preston Constant Service Waterworks Act 1854 (17 & 18 Vict. c. v))
Norfolk Drainage Act 1834	4 & 5 Will. 4. c. lxiii	16 June 1834
An Act for more effectually draining and preserving certain Fen Lands and Low Grounds in the Parishes of Stoke Ferry, Northwold, Wretton, Wareham, West Dereham, Roxham, Fordham, Denver, Downham Market, Wimbotsham, and Slow Bardolph in the County of Norfolk.
Holbeach and Gedney Drainage (Lincolnshire) Act 1834	4 & 5 Will. 4. c. lxiv	16 June 1834
An Act for embanking, draining, and otherwise improving Lands in the Parishes of Holbeach and Gedney in the County of Lincoln.
Dublin Cemetery Act 1834	4 & 5 Will. 4. c. lxv	27 June 1834
An Act for establishing a general Cemetery in the Neighbourhood of the City of Dublin.
Fishguard Market Act 1834	4 & 5 Will. 4. c. lxvi	27 June 1834
An Act for establishing a Market within the Town of Fishguard in the County of Pembroke.
Perth Port and Harbour and Tay Navigation Act 1834 (repealed)	4 & 5 Will. 4. c. lxvii	27 June 1834
An Act to alter and amend an Act passed in the Eleventh Year of the Reign of His late Majesty and First Year of the Reign of His present Majesty, (Note: Perth Harbour and Tay Navigation Act 1830 (11 Geo. 4 & 1 Will. 4. c. cxxi)) intituled "An Act for enlarging, improving, and maintaining the Port and Harbour of Perth, for improving the Navigation of the River Tay to the said City, and for other Purposes therewith connected." (Repealed by Perth Burgh and Harbour (No. 2) Act 1856 (19 & 20 Vict. c. cxxxviii))
Hayle Railway Act 1834	4 & 5 Will. 4. c. lxviii	27 June 1834
An Act for making and maintaining a Railway from Hayle in the Parish of Saint Erth in the County of Cornwall to Tresavean Mine in the Parish of Gwennap in the said County, with several Branches therefrom.
West Cork Mining Company Act 1834	4 & 5 Will. 4. c. lxix	27 June 1834
An Act to encourage the working of Mines and Quarries in Ireland, and to regulate a Joint Stock Company for that Purpose, to be called "The West Cork Mining Company."
Carmarthenshire Railway or Tramroad Company Act 1834	4 & 5 Will. 4. c. lxx	27 June 1834
An Act to enable the Carmarthenshire Railway or Tramroad Company to raise a further Sum of Money, and to amend the Act (Note: Carmarthenshire Railway or Tramroad Company Act 1802 (42 Geo. 3. c. lxxx)) relating to the said Company.
Edinburgh and Dalkeith Railway (Dalkeith and Leith Branches) Act 1834 (repealed)	4 & 5 Will. 4. c. lxxi	27 June 1834
An Act to enable the Edinburgh and Dalkeith Railway Company to make a Branch from the said Railway to the Town of Dalkeith, and to extend the Leith Branch of the said Railway, and for other Purposes relating thereto. (Repealed by North British Railway Consolidation Act 1858 (21 & 22 Vict. c. cix))
Lanark Roads and Crossford Bridge Act 1834	4 & 5 Will. 4. c. lxxii	27 June 1834
An Act for making and for more effectually maintaining and repairing certain Roads in the County of Lanark, and for building a Bridge over the River Clyde at Crossford in the said County.
Roads from Kingsbridge to Dartmouth Act 1834 (repealed)	4 & 5 Will. 4. c. lxxiii	27 June 1834
An Act for more effectually repairing certain Roads from Kingsbridge to Dartmouth, and for making new Branches to and from the same, all in the County of Devon. (Repealed by Kingsbridge and Dartmouth Roads Act 1866 (29 & 30 Vict. c. clxx))
Banbridge and Belfast Mail Coach Road Act 1834 (repealed)	4 & 5 Will. 4. c. lxxiv	27 June 1834
An Act for amending, varying the Tolls, and extending the Term of an Act of the Fifty-ninth Year of His late Majesty King George the Third, (Note: Banbridge and Belfast Road Act 1819 (59 Geo. 3. c. cxxviii)) for amending and keeping in repair the Mail Coach Road leading from Banbridge in the County of Down to Belfast in the County of Antrim (Repealed by Turnpike Trusts Abolition (Ireland) Act 1857 (20 & 21 Vict. c. 16))
Hammersmith Parish Act 1834 (repealed)	4 & 5 Will. 4. c. lxxv	27 June 1834
An act for making the Hamlet of Hammersmith, within the Parish of Fulham in the County of Middlesex, a distinct and separate Parish, and for converting the Perpetual Curacy of the Church of Saint Paul Hammersmith into a Vicarage, and for the Endowment thereof. (Repealed by London Government Act 1963 (c. 33))
Edinburgh Improvement Act 1834 (repealed)	4 & 5 Will. 4. c. lxxvi	25 July 1834
An Act for continuing certain Acts for regulating the Police of the City of Edinburgh and the adjoining Districts, and for other Purposes relating thereto. (Repealed by Edinburgh Municipal and Police Act 1879 (42 & 43 Vict. c. cxxxii))
City of London Constables Act 1834	4 & 5 Will. 4. c. lxxvii	25 July 1834
An Act for more effectually enforcing the due Execution of the Office of Constable in the City of London and Liberties thereof.
South London Water Works Act 1834 (repealed)	4 & 5 Will. 4. c. lxxviii	25 July 1834
An Act to alter, amend, enlarge, and extend the Powers and Provisions of several Acts for enabling the Company of Proprietors of the South London Waterworks to supply the Inhabitants of the Parish of Saint Giles Camberwell and Parts of the Parish of Saint Marys Lambeth, and several other Parishes and Places in the County of Surrey, with Water; and to enable the said Company to supply the Inhabitants of the several Parishes of Saint Mary Lambeth, Saint Mary Newington, Saint George the Martyr, Saint Saviour, Saint John, Saint Thomas, Saint Olave, and Christchurch, all in the said County, with Water. (Repealed by Southwark and Vauxhall Water Company Act 1845 (8 & 9 Vict. c. lxix))
Southwark Water Act 1834 (repealed)	4 & 5 Will. 4. c. lxxix	25 July 1834
An Act for belter supplying with Water the Borough of Southwark, and Parishes and Places in the County of Surrey near thereto. (Repealed by Southwark and Vauxhall Water Act 1852 (15 & 16 Vict. c. clviii))
Elgin and Forres Gaols and Court Houses Act 1834	4 & 5 Will. 4. c. lxxx	25 July 1834
An Act for erecting and maintaining a new Gaol and Court House and other Offices for the Burgh of Elgin and the County of Elgin and Forres; and for erecting and maintaining a new Gaol and Court House and other Offices for the Burgh of Forres; and for other Purposes relative thereto.
Dundee Gaol Act 1834	4 & 5 Will. 4. c. lxxxi	25 July 1834
An Act for erecting and maintaining a Gaol for the Royal Burgh of Dundee in the County of Forfar.
General Steam Navigation Company Act 1834 (repealed)	4 & 5 Will. 4. c. lxxxii	25 July 1834
An Act to amend and enlarge the Powers of an Act passed in the Second Year of the Reign of His present Majesty, intituled "An Act for granting certain Powers to a Company called 'The General Steam Navigation Company.'" (Note: General Steam Navigation Company Act 1831 (1 & 2 Will. 4. c. liii)) (Repealed by General Steam Navigation Company Act 1874 (37 & 38 Vict. c. viii))
Old Stratford Bridge Act 1834	4 & 5 Will. 4. c. lxxxiii	25 July 1834
An Act for taking down and removing Old Stratford Bridge over the River Ouse in the Counties of Buckingham and Northampton, and for erecting a more commodious Bridge in lieu thereof.
Limerick Bridge Act 1834	4 & 5 Will. 4. c. lxxxiv	25 July 1834
An Act to amend an Act passed in the Fourth Year of the Reign of His late Majesty King George the Fourth, intituled "An Act for the Erection of a Bridge across the River Shannon, and of a Floating Dock to accommodate sharp Vessels frequenting the Port of Limerick." (Note: Limerick Bridge and Floating Dock Act 1823 (4 Geo. 4. c. xciv))
Itchen Bridge and Roads Act 1834 (repealed)	4 & 5 Will. 4. c. lxxxv	25 July 1834
An Act for establishing a Floating Bridge over the River Itchen from or near a Place called Cross Bouse, within the Liberties of the Town of Southampton, to the opposite Shore in the County of Southampton, with proper Approaches thereto, and for making Roads to communicate therewith. (Repealed by Southampton Corporation Act 1973 (c. xix))
Stotfield and Lossiemouth Harbour Act 1834 (repealed)	4 & 5 Will. 4. c. lxxxvi	25 July 1834
An Act for constructing and maintaining a new Harbour at Stotfield Point, near to and in conjunction with the old Harbour of Lossiemouth in the County of Elgin and Forres. (Repealed by Elgin and Lossiemouth Harbour Act 1856 (19 & 20 Vict. c. lxvii))
Boston Port and Harbour Act 1834 (repealed)	4 & 5 Will. 4. c. lxxxvii	25 July 1834
An Act to extend the Powers of the several Acts now in force for improving the Port and Harbour of Boston in the County of Lincoln. (Repealed by River Welland Dues Act 1842 (5 & 6 Vict. c. lv))
London and South Western Railway Act 1834	4 & 5 Will. 4. c. lxxxviii	25 July 1834
An Act for making a Railway from London to Southampton.
Middlesex and Essex Turnpike Roads and Bridges Act 1834	4 & 5 Will. 4. c. lxxxix	25 July 1834
An Act to continue, alter, and amend an Act of the Fourth Year of the Reign of His late Majesty King George the Fourth, (Note: Middlesex and Essex Turnpike Roads Act 1823 (4 Geo. 4. c. cvi)) for more effectually repairing and improving the Middlesex and Essex Turnpike Roads; to provide for the rebuilding of Bow Bridge in the Counties of Middlesex and Essex, the improving of the several other Bridges upon the said Roads, and for other Purposes relating thereto.
Kingstown Improvement Act 1834	4 & 5 Will. 4. c. xc	25 July 1834
An Act for paving, watching, lighting, regulating, and otherwise improving the Town of Kingstown in the County of Dublin.
Statute Labour in Orkney Act 1834 (repealed)	4 & 5 Will. 4. c. xci	30 July 1834
An Act for regulating and converting the Statute Labour in the Stewartry or Sheriffdom of Orkney, and for more effectually making, repairing, and maintaining the High Roads and Bridges within the same. (Repealed by Orkney Roads Act 1857 (20 & 21 Vict. c. lxxv))
Liverpool Court of Passage Act 1834 (repealed)	4 & 5 Will. 4. c. xcii	30 July 1834
An Act for amending the Proceedings and Practice of the Court of Passage of the Borough of Liverpool in the County Palatine of Lancaster. (Repealed by Liverpool Corporation Act 1921 (11 & 12 Geo. 5. c. lxxiv))
Port Crommelin Harbour Act 1834	4 & 5 Will. 4. c. xciii	30 July 1834
An Act to amend and explain an Act passed in the First Year of His present Majesty, (Note: Port Crommelin Harbour Act 1830 (11 Geo. 4 & 1 Will. 4. c. cxxxiv)) for establishing and maintaining the Harbour of Port Crommelin in the Bay of Cushendun in the County of Antrim.
Barrington and Campsfield and Enslow Bridge Roads (Oxfordshire) Act 1834 (repealed)	4 & 5 Will. 4. c. xciv	30 July 1834
An Act for making, improving, and keeping in repair the Roads leading from Barrington to Campsfield and Endow Bridge in the County of Oxford. (Repealed by Statute Law (Repeals) Act 2013 (c. 2))
Bermondsey Improvement Act 1834 (repealed)	4 & 5 Will. 4. c. xcv	13 August 1834
An Act for better paving, cleansing, lighting, and improving the Waterside Division of the Parish of Saint Mary Magdalen, Bermondsey, in the County of Surrey. (Repealed by Bermondsey Improvement Act 1845 (8 & 9 Vict. c. clxxvii))
Durham and Sunderland Railway Act 1834	4 & 5 Will. 4. c. xcvi	13 August 1834
An Act for incorporating certain Persons for the Carriage of Goods and Commodities by means of a Railway from the City of Durham to Sunderland near the Sea, with a Branch to join the Hartlepool Railway in the Township of Haswell, all in the County of Durham.

=== Private acts ===
Short title	Citation	Royal assent
Long title
Arle and Arleston in Cheltenham (Gloucestershire) Inclosure (Amendment) Act 1834	4 & 5 Will. 4. c. 1 Pr.	22 May 1834
An Act for amending an Act of the Eleventh Year of the Reign of His late Majesty King George the Fourth, intituled "An Act for inclosing Lands in the Tithings of Arle and Arleston otherwise Allstone in the Parish of Cheltenham in the County of Gloucester, and for discharging from Tithes Lands in the said Tithings." (Note: Arle and Arleston in Cheltenham (Gloucestershire) Inclosure Act 1830 (11 Geo. 4 & 1 Will. 4. c. 6 Pr.))
Tisbury Inclosure Act 1834	4 & 5 Will. 4. c. 2 Pr.	22 May 1834
An Act for inclosing Lands in the Parish of Tisbury in the County of Wilts, and for dividing the said Parish into Three Parishes.
Great Shelford Inclosure Act 1834	4 & 5 Will. 4. c. 3 Pr.	22 May 1834
An Act for inclosing Lands in the Parish of Great Shelford in the County of Cambridge, and for commuting the Tithes of the said Parish.
Duntsborne Rouse Inclosure Act 1834	4 & 5 Will. 4. c. 4 Pr.	22 May 1834
An Act for inclosing Lands in the Parish of Duntsborne Rouse in the County of Gloucester, and for exonerating from Tithes the Lands in the said Parish.
Cockerham Vicarage Act 1834	4 & 5 Will. 4. c. 5 Pr.	16 June 1834
An Act to effect a Partition of the Advowson of the Vicarage and Parish Church of Cocherham in the County Palatine of Lancaster, and to confirm the Sale of the next Turn or Right of Presentation thereto.
Isaac Bowcock's Charity Estates Act 1834	4 & 5 Will. 4. c. 6 Pr.	16 June 1834
An Act for more effectually vesting in the Feoffees acting under the Will of Isaac Bowcock certain Estates in the County of York, held for certain charitable Uses applicable within the Parish of Keighley in the said County, and for confirming certain Leases, Covenants, and Contracts of Sale already made as to Parts of such Estates, and authorizing the granting of Building Leases and the Sale of other Parts of such Estates.
St. Paul's Cathedral's Estate Act 1834	4 & 5 Will. 4. c. 7 Pr.	16 June 1834
An Act for enabling the Dean and Chapter of the Cathedral Church of Saint Paul in London, and their Successors, to grant Licences for building upon and improving the Copyholds within the Manor of Sutton Court in the Parish of Chiswick in the County of Middlesex, and to grant Licences to demise such Copyholds for those Purposes, and to fix the Fines payable upon Admission to the same during limited Periods.
Grubbe's Estate Act 1834	4 & 5 Will. 4. c. 8 Pr.	16 June 1834
An Act for vesting Estates belonging to Eleanora Anne Julia Hunt Grubbe Spinster, an Infant, in Trustees for Sale, and for laying out the Money arising from such Sale, under the Direction of the High Court of Chancery, in the Purchase of other Estates, and for granting Leases of the Estates to be purchased; and for other Purposes.
Kirkby Lonsdale (Westmorland) Tithe Commutation Act 1834	4 & 5 Will. 4. c. 9 Pr.	16 June 1834
An Act to commute for a Corn Rent certain Tithes within the Parish of Kirkby Lonsdale in the County of Westmorland.
Dalwood Inclosure Act 1834	4 & 5 Will. 4. c. 10 Pr.	16 June 1834
An Act for inclosing Lands in the Parish of Dalwood in the County of Dorset.
Middleton in Teesdale Inclosure Act 1834	4 & 5 Will. 4. c. 11 Pr.	16 June 1834
An Act for inclosing Lands in the Parish of Middleton in Teesdale in the County of Durham.
Kirk Langley Inclosure Act 1834	4 & 5 Will. 4. c. 12 Pr.	16 June 1834
An Act for dividing, allotting, inclosing, and otherwise improving the Open Fields, Commons, and Waste Lands in the Liberty of Kirk Langley in the County of Derby.
Colmworth Inclosure Act 1834	4 & 5 Will. 4. c. 13 Pr.	16 June 1834
An Act for inclosing and exonerating from Tythes Lands in the Parish of Colmworth in the County of Bedford.
Elm Inclosure Act 1834	4 & 5 Will. 4. c. 14 Pr.	16 June 1834
An Act for inclosing, dividing, and allotting the Commons, Droves, Banks, and Waste Lands in the Parish of Elm in the Isle of Ely in the County of Cambridge.
Alstonefield Inclosure Act 1834	4 & 5 Will. 4. c. 15 Pr.	16 June 1834
An Act for inclosing Lands within the Townships of Alstonefield, Warslow, Lower Elkstone, Fawfieldhead, Hollingsclough, Heathilee, and Quarnford, all in the Parish of Alstonefield in the County of Stafford.
Chipstable Inclosure Act 1834	4 & 5 Will. 4. c. 16 Pr.	16 June 1834
An Act for inclosing Lands in the Parish of Chipstable in the County of Somerset.
Longney Inclosure Act 1834	4 & 5 Will. 4. c. 17 Pr.	16 June 1834
An Act to amend the Corn Rent Schedules annexed to the Award made in pursuance of an Act of the Fifty-second Year of the Reign of His late Majesty King George the Third, (Note: Longney (Gloucestershire) Inclosure Act 1812 (52 Geo. 3. c. 23 Pr.)) for inclosing Lands in the Parish of Longney in the County of Gloucester.
Kendal (Westmorland) Tithe Commutation Act 1834	4 & 5 Will. 4. c. 18 Pr.	27 June 1834
An Act to commute for a Corn Rent the Tithes and Dues payable to the Rectors and Vicar of the Parish of Kendal otherwise Kirkby Kendal in the County of Westmoreland.
William Molyneux's Estate Act 1834	4 & 5 Will. 4. c. 19 Pr.	27 June 1834
An Act for confirming and carrying into effect a Partition and Division of the Real and Personal Estates of William Molyneux Esquire, deceased, and for other Purposes therein mentioned.
Earl of Mountrath's Will Act 1834	4 & 5 Will. 4. c. 20 Pr.	27 June 1834
An Act for facilitating the Proof of the Will of the Right Honorable Charles Henry Coote late Earl of Mountrath in certain Actions in Ireland.
Hugh Earl of Eglinton's Estate Act 1834	4 & 5 Will. 4. c. 21 Pr.	27 June 1834
An Act to enable the Trustees of Hugh Montgomerie of Shelmorlie, Earl of Eglinton, deceased, to sell a Part of the Trust Estates, in order to extinguish the Debts left by the said Earl which affect or may be made to affect the said Estates.
Earl of Dunmore's Estate Act 1834	4 & 5 Will. 4. c. 22 Pr.	27 June 1834
An Act for settling and securing the Lands of Potterfield, and Parts of the Lands, Lordship, and Barony of Elphinstone, in the County of Stirling, to and in favour of George Earl of Dunmore and the Series of Heirs entitled to succeed under a Deed of Entail made by the Trustees of John Earl of Dunmore deceased, and under the Conditions and Limitations contained therein, and for vesting in lieu thereof the Lands of Carrick, Innermuck, and others, in the County of Argyll, in the said George Earl of Dunmore and his Heirs and Assignees in Fee Simple.
George Viscount Keith's Estate Act 1834	4 & 5 Will. 4. c. 23 Pr.	27 June 1834
An Act to enable the Trustees of George Viscount Keith deceased to sell certain Lands vested in them in Trust, and purchase with the Price thereof the Lands of Burnbrae; and to empower the Heir of Entail of the said Lands of Burnbrae to dispose of the same; and for investing the Price thereof in other Lands, to be entailed to the same Series of Heirs.
Sir John Aubrey's Estate Act 1834	4 & 5 Will. 4. c. 24 Pr.	27 June 1834
An Act to grant further Powers of leasing Part of the Estates devised by and purchased pursuant to the Will of Sir John Aubrey Baronet, deceased.
Henry Peirse's Estate Act 1834	4 & 5 Will. 4. c. 25 Pr.	27 June 1834
An Act for vesting Part of the Settled Estates in the County of York devised by the Will of Henry Peirse Esquire, deceased, in Trustees, upon Trust to sell, and to apply the Monies arising therefrom, under the Direction of the High Court of Chancery, in the Purchase of other Estates to be settled to the same Uses, with Power to pay off Incumbrances.
Sir John Palmer Acland's Estate Act 1834	4 & 5 Will. 4. c. 26 Pr.	27 June 1834
An Act for exonerating Estates in the Counties of Somerset sad Devon comprised in the Marriage Settlement of Sir John Palmer Acland Baronet, deceased, from the Jointure or Rent-Charge thereby limited to Dame Sarah Maria Palmer Acland his Widow, during her Life, and for charging other Estates in the County of Somerset devised and directed to be purchased by the Will of the said Sir John Palmer Acland with the Payment thereof.
Henry Aston's Estate Act 1834	4 & 5 Will. 4. c. 27 Pr.	27 June 1834
An Act for vesting certain detached Estates devised by the Will of the late Henry Charles Aston Esquire, deceased, in Trustees, upon Trust to raise Money for the--Purchase of an Estate called the Button Estate, in the County of Chester, and for other Purposes incidental thereto.
Earl of Kintore's Estates Act 1834	4 & 5 Will. 4. c. 28 Pr.	27 June 1834
An Act for effecting an Exchange of certain Parts of the Entailed Estates of the Right Honourable Anthony Adrian Keith Falconer Earl of Kintore, Lord Falconer, of Haulkertown, situated in the Counties of Kincardine and Forfar, for certain Lands belonging to Robert Taylor of Kirktonhill, Esquire, situated in the County of Kincardine.
Stanwick (Northamptonshire) Inclosure Act 1834	4 & 5 Will. 4. c. 29 Pr.	27 June 1834
An Act for inclosing Lands within the Parish and Manor of Stanwick in the County of Northampton, and for extinguishing the Tithes therein.
Reynold's Estate Act 1834	4 & 5 Will. 4. c. 30 Pr.	27 June 1834
An Act for vesting certain Estates situate in the Parish of Herne in the County of Kent devised by the Will of Edward Reynolds Esquire, deceased, in Trustees for Sale, and for laying out the Monies to be produced by such Sale in the Purchase of other Estates, to be settled to the same Uses.
Marquis and Marchioness of Hasting's Estate Act 1834	4 & 5 Will. 4. c. 31 Pr.	25 July 1834
An Act for vesting Part of the Settled Estates of the Most Honourable George Augustus Francis Rawdon Hastings Marquis of Hastings and the Most Honourable Barbara Yelverton Marchioness of Hastings, Baroness Grey de Ruthyn, his Wife, situate in the County of Warwick, in Trustees for Sale, and for laying out the Money arising from such Sale in the Purchase of other Lands, to be settled to the same Uses.
Russell's Estate Act 1834	4 & 5 Will. 4. c. 32 Pr.	25 July 1834
An Act for vesting the Estates in the Counties of Surrey and Cornwall devised by the Will of Matthew Russell Esquire, deceased, in Trustees, upon Trust to sell the same, and to lay out the Monies to arise from such Sale in discharging Incumbrances on other Estates settled to the same Uses, or in the Purchase of other Estates, to be settled to the same Uses.
Oldbury (Salop.) Curacy's Estate Act 1834	4 & 5 Will. 4. c. 33 Pr.	25 July 1834
An Act to authorize the Sale of Lands settled for the perpetual Augmentation of the Curacy of Oldbury in the County of Salop.
Mealiffe, Upper Church and Temple Beg Inclosure Act 1834 or the Mealiffe, Upper Church and Temple Beg (Tipperary) Inclosure Act 1834	4 & 5 Will. 4. c. 34 Pr.	30 July 1834
An Act for inclosing Commons and Waste Lands within the Parishes of Mealiffe, Upper Church, and Temple Beg, in the County of Tipperary.
Establishment of Honey Lane Market School Act 1834	4 & 5 Will. 4. c. 35 Pr.	13 August 1834
An Act for establishing a School on the Site of Honey Lane Market in the City of London.
Relief of Patrick Brady and Richard Blackwood in respect of their estates in Cavan.	4 & 5 Will. 4. c. 36 Pr.	13 August 1834
An Act for the Relief of Patrick Richard Blackwood Brady and Richard Blackwood Esquires, in respect of certain Lands and Premises, their Estates, situate in the County of Cavan in Ireland.
Thomas's Name Act 1834 (Note: This act was not printed by the King's Printer.)	4 & 5 Will. 4. c. 37 Pr.	26 March 1834
An Act to enable James Thomas of Halifax in the County of York, Gentleman, and his Issue, to take and use the Surname and Arms of Berry.
Raskelf Inclosure Act 1834	4 & 5 Will. 4. c. 38 Pr.	22 May 1834
An Act for inclosing Lands in the Township of Raskelf in the Parish of Easingwold in the North Riding of the County of York.
Mousley's Naturalization Act 1834	4 & 5 Will. 4. c. 39 Pr.	16 June 1834
An Act for the Naturalization of John Peter Segundo Mousley and Charles Edward Eugene Mousley.
Upway Inclosure Act 1834	4 & 5 Will. 4. c. 40 Pr.	16 June 1834
An Act for inclosing Lands within the Manors and Tithings of Elwell otherwise Ridgeway and Stottingway within the Parish of Upway in the County of Dorset.
Allan's Divorce Act 1834	4 & 5 Will. 4. c. 41 Pr.	27 June 1834
An Act to dissolve the Marriage of John Allan with Jane his now Wife, and to enable him to marry again; and for other Purposes therein mentioned.
Lumley's Name Act 1834	4 & 5 Will. 4. c. 42 Pr.	27 June 1834
An Act to enable Frederick Lumley Esquire to take and use the Surname and Arms of Savile.
Francken's Naturalization Act 1834	4 & 5 Will. 4. c. 43 Pr.	27 June 1834
An Act for naturalizing Charles William Francken.
Horlock's Divorce Act 1834	4 & 5 Will. 4. c. 44 Pr.	25 July 1834
An Act to dissolve the Marriage of Isaac John Horlock Esquire with Phebe Horlock his now Wife, and to enable him to marry again; and for other Purposes therein mentioned.
Arthur, William, Jeanne and Charles de la Rive's Naturalization Act 1834	4 & 5 Will. 4. c. 45 Pr.	25 July 1834
An Act for naturalizing Arthur Auguste de la Rive of Geneva, and William de la Rive, Jeanne Adele de la Rive, and Charles Lucien de la Rive, his Children.
Howell's Divorce Act 1834	4 & 5 Will. 4. c. 46 Pr.	13 August 1834
An Act to dissolve the Marriage of Henry Howell with Elizabeth his now Wife, and to enable him to marry again; and for other Purposes therein mentioned.

=== Sources ===
- The Statutes of the United Kingdom of Great Britain and Ireland, 4 & 5 William IV. 1834. London. 1834 – via Internet Archive.
- The Statutes of the United Kingdom of Great Britain and Ireland, 4 & 5 William IV. 1834. London. 1834 – via Google Books.
- A Collection of the Public General Statutes passed in the Fourth and Fifth Year of the Reign of His Majesty King William the Fourth, 1834. London: Eyre and Spottiswoode. 1834 – via Internet Archive.
- The Statutes: Revised Edition. Vol. 7: 2 & 3 William IV to 6 & 7 William IV. AD 1831-1836. London: Eyre & Spottiswoode. 1875 – via Google Books.
- The Journals of the House of Commons. Vol. 89. London: His Majesty's Stationery Office. 1834. pp. 3–604 – via Internet Archive.

== See also ==
- List of acts of the Parliament of the United Kingdom
