= Customs and Excise Act 1787 =

Act of the Parliament of Great Britain

- Act of Parliament
- Parliament of Great Britain
- Long title: An Act for repealing the several Duties of Customs and Excise, and granting other Duties in Lieu thereof; and for applying the said Duties, together with the other Duties composing the Publick Revenue; for permitting the Importation of certain Goods, Wares, and Merchandize, the produce or manufacture of the European Dominions of the French King into this Kingdom; and for applying certain unclaimed Monies remaining in the Exchequer for the Payment of Annuities on Lives, to the Reduction of the National Debt.
- Citation: 27 Geo. 3. c. 13
- Territorial extent: Great Britain

Dates
- Royal assent: 25 April 1787
- Commencement: 10 May 1787 (Note: Section 1.)
- Repealed: 21 August 1871

Other legislation
- Amended by: Customs Law Repeal Act 1825; Exchequer and Audit Departments Act 1866; Inland Revenue Repeal Act 1870
- Repealed by: Statute Law Revision Act 1871

Status: Repealed

Text of statute as originally enacted

The Customs and Excise Act 1787 (27 Geo. 3. c. 13), also known as the Gilbert Act, was an act of the Parliament of Great Britain that consolidated and reformed customs duties in Great Britain.

The act revolutionised the collections of customs duties, abolishing old duties and substituting new ones.

== Provisions ==
Section 1 of the act provided that from 10 May 1787, "all subsidies, customs, importations, or duties whatever (respecting the revenue of customs) payable to his Majesty, customs, and his heirs and successors, by virtue of any act or acts of parliament now in force, upon the importation of any goods, wares, backs, to or merchandize, into Great Britain; or upon the exportation of cease, any goods, wares, or merchandize, from Great Britain; or upon any goods, wares, or merchandize, being brought or carried coastwise, or from port to port within the said kingdom, and the several and respective drawbacks allowed upon the exportation of any goods, wares, or merchandize, from Great Britain or on any other account whatever, respecting the duties of customs; and also the additional imposts or duties charged upon the product and amount of the said several duties of customs, shall cease", with the exception of certain duties payable to the City of London and certain duties, including in Newcastle upon Tyne. The act provided that the duties listed in the act would replace them from that point.

== Subsequent developments ==
The Select Committee on Temporary Laws described this act as a consolidation act.

Sections 2–20, 22, 24, 26–30 and 32–34 of the act were effectively repealed by 444 of the Customs Law Repeal Act 1825 (6 Geo. 4. c. 105), which repealed the act "as relates to the Importation or Exportation of Goods, Wares or Merchandize, or as relates to the Mode of collecting or securing Payment of Duties of Customs, or the Allowance of Drawback of such Duties, upon any Goods, Wares or Merchandize imported into or exported from this Kingdom."

Section 72 of the act was repealed by section 46 of, and schedule C to, the Exchequer and Audit Departments Act 1866 (29 & 30 Vict. c. 39).

Sections 41–46 of the act were repealed by section 2 of, and the schedule to, the Inland Revenue Repeal Act 1870 (33 & 34 Vict. c. 99).

The whole act was repealed by section 1 of, and the schedule to, the Statute Law Revision Act 1871 (34 & 35 Vict. c. 116), which came into force on 21 August 1871.
