= Exchequer and Audit Departments Act 1866 =

Act of the Parliament of the United Kingdom

Exchequer and Audit Departments Act 1866 (Note: Section 1.)
- Act of Parliament
- Parliament of the United Kingdom
- Long title: An Act to consolidate the Duties of the Exchequer and Audit Departments. to regulate the Receipt, Custody, and Issue of Public Moneys, and to provide for the Audit of the Accounts thereof.
- Citation: 29 & 30 Vict. c. 39
- Territorial extent: United Kingdom

Dates
- Royal assent: 28 June 1866
- Commencement: 1 April 1867 (Note: Section 47.)
Other legislation
| Amends | See § Repealed enactments |
| Repeals/revokes | See § Repealed enactments |
| Amended by | Statute Law Revision Act 1893; Exchequer and Audit Departments Act 1921; Exchequer and Audit Departments Act 1950; Customs and Excise Act 1952; Finance Act 1954; National Loans Act 1968; Statute Law (Repeals) Act 1975; Customs and Excise Management Act 1979; National Heritage Act 1983; Government Trading Act 1990; Scotland Act 1998; Social Security Contributions (Transfer of Functions, etc.) Act 1999; Tax Credits Act 1999; Government Resources and Accounts Act 2000; Tax Credits Act 2002; Finance Act 2002; Statute Law (Repeals) Act 2004; Commissioners for Revenue and Customs Act 2005; Budget Responsibility and National Audit Act 2011 |
| Relates to | Exchequer Bills and Bonds Act 1866 |

Status: Amended

Text of statute as originally enacted

Revised text of statute as amended

Text of the Exchequer and Audit Departments Act 1866 as in force today (including any amendments) within the United Kingdom, from legislation.gov.uk.

The Exchequer and Audit Departments Act 1866 (29 & 30 Vict. c. 39) is the act of the Parliament of the United Kingdom under which most of the revenue from taxation, and all other money payable to the Exchequer, must be paid into the Consolidated Fund.

The act "established a cycle of accountability for public funds": Public spending was authorised by the House of Commons while the public fund was controlled by the Comptroller and Auditor General who was also responsible for auditing the financial accounts produced by each government department. The Committee of Public Accounts, which had been established in 1861 by William Gladstone, was appointed to oversee the work of the Comptroller.

== Provisions ==
=== Comptroller and Auditor General ===
The act combined the functions of two historical job functions:

- the Comptroller General of the Exchequer, who had authorised the issue of public monies to departments since 1834;
- the Commissioners of Audit, who had traditionally presented the government accounts to the Treasury.

Under the terms of the act the 'Comptroller and Auditor General' continued to authorise the issue of money to departments (the comptroller function) and was given the new task of examining departmental accounts and reporting the results to Parliament.

=== Repealed enactments ===
Section 46 of the act repealed 23 enactments, listed in schedule c to the act.

| Citation | Short title | Description | Extent of repeal |
|---|---|---|---|
| 25 Geo. 3. c. 52 | Audit of Public Accounts Act 1785 | An Act for better examining and auditing the Publick Accounts of this Kingdom. | The whole act. |
| 27 Geo. 3. c. 13 | Customs and Excise Act 1787 | An Act for repealing the several Duties of Customs and Excise, and granting other Duties in lieu thereof, and for applying the said Duties, together with the other Duties composing the Publick Revenue; for permitting the Importation of certain Goods, Wares, and Merchandize, the Produce or Manufacture of the European Dominions of the French King, into this Kingdom; and for applying certain unclaimed Monies, remaining in the Exchequer for the Payment of Annuities on Lives, to the Reduction of the National Debt. | Section seventy-two. |
| 39 & 40 Geo. 3. c. 54 | Public Accountants Act 1800 | An Act for more effectually charging Publick Accountants with the Payment of Interest; for allowing Interest to them in certain Cases; and for compelling the Payment of Balances due from them. | Sections four, five, six, nine, ten, and thirteen. |
| 45 Geo. 3. c. 55 | Audit of Public Accounts Act 1805 | An Act to amend an Act made in the Twenty-fifth Tear of His present Majesty, for better examining and auditing the Publick Accounts of this Kingdom; and for enabling the Commissioners, in certain Cases, to allow of Vouchers, although not stamped according to Law. | The whole act. |
| 46 Geo. 3. c. 141 | Audit of Public Accounts Act 1806 | An Act for making more effectual Provision for the more speedy and regular Examination and Audit of the Public Accounts of this Kingdom. | The whole act. |
| 47 Geo. 3. Sess. 2. c. 39 | Public Accountants, etc. Act 1807 | An Act for more effectually charging Publick Accountants with Interest upon Balances, and for other Purposes relating to the passing of Publick Accounts. | The whole act. |
| 52 Geo. 3. c. 52 | Audit of Public Accounts (Ireland) Act 1812 | An Act to provide for the speedy and regular Examination and Audit of the Public Accounts of Ireland; and to repeal certain former Acts relating thereto. | The whole act. |
| 53 Geo. 3. c. 150 | Audit of Accounts, etc. Act 1813 | An Act for the more speedy and effectual Examination and Audit of the Accounts of Military Expenditure in Spain and Portugal; for removing Delays in passing the Public Accounts; and for making new Arrangements for conducting the Business of the Audit Office. | The whole act. |
| 57 Geo. 3. c. 48 | Consolidated Fund, etc. Act 1817 | An Act to make further Provision for the Adjustment of the Accounts of the Consolidated Fund of the United Kingdom; and for making good any occasional Deficiency which may arise in the said Fund in Great Britain or Ireland respectively; and to direct the Application of Monies by the Commissioners' for the Reduction of the National Debt. | The whole act. |
| 1 & 2 Geo. 4. c. 121 | Commissariat Accounts Act 1821 | An Act to alter and abolish certain Forms of Proceedings in the Exchequer and Audit Office relative to Public Accountants; and for making further Provisions, for the purpose of facilitating and expediting the passing of Public Accounts in Great Britain and to render perpetual and amend an Act passed in the Fifty-fourth year of His late Majesty for the effectual Examination of the Accounts of certain Colonial Revenues. | Except Sections Twenty-seven, Twenty-eight, and Twenty-nine. |
| 10 Geo. 4. c. 27 | National Debt Act 1829 | An Act to amend the several Acts for regulating the Reduction of the National Debt. | The whole act. |
| 2 & 3 Will. 4. c 26 | Colonial Audit Revenues Act 1832 | An Act to authorize the Commissioners for Auditing the Public Accounts of Great Britain to examine and audit Accounts of the Receipt and Expenditure of Colonial Revenues. | The whole act. |
| 2 & 3 Will. 4. c. 99 | Commissioners of Audit Act 1832 | An Act for transferring the Powers and Duties of the Commissioners of Public Accounts in Ireland to the Commissioners for Auditing the Public Accounts of Great Britain. | The whole act. |
| 2 & 3 Will. 4. c. 104 | Public Accounts Act 1832 | An Act to regulate the Period of rendering the Public Accounts and making up the General Imprest Certificates. | The whole act. |
| 4 & 5 Will. 4. c. 15 | Office of Receipt of Exchequer Act 1834 | An Act to regulate the Office of the Receipt of His Majesty's Exchequer at Westminster. | Except sections seven and twenty-six. |
| 3 & 4 Vict. c. 108 | Municipal Corporations (Ireland) Act 1840 | An Act for the Regulation of Municipal Corporations in Ireland. | Sections two hundred and thirteen and two hundred and fourteen. |
| 9 & 10 Vict. c. 92 | Naval and Military Accounts Act 1846 | An Act to provide for the Preparation, Audit, and Presentation to Parliament of Annual Accounts of the Receipt and Expenditure of the Naval and Military Departments. | The whole act. |
| 14 & 15 Vict. c. 42 | Crown Lands Act 1851 | An Act to make better Provision for the Management of the Woods, Forests, and Land Revenues of the Crown, and for the Direction of Public Works and Buildings. | Section thirty-eight wholly, and section thirty-nine as far as it relates to the Accounts of the Commissioners of Her Majesty's Works and Public Buildings. |
| 17 & 18 Vict. c. 19 | Naval Pay and Prize Act 1854 | The Naval Pay and Prize Act, 1854. | |
| 17 & 18 Vict. c. 94 | Public Revenue and Consolidated Fund Charges Act 1854 | An Act to alter the mode of providing for certain Expenses now charged upon certain branches of the Public Revenues and upon the Consolidated Fund. | Sections three, four, and five. |
| 18 & 19 Vict. c. 96 | Supplemental Customs Consolidation Act 1855 | The Supplemental Customs Consolidation Act, 1855. | Section one. |
| 24 & 25 Vict. c. 93 | Revenue Departments Accounts Act 1861 | An Act to provide for the Preparation, Audit, and Presentation to Parliament of Annual Accounts of the Appropriation of the Moneys voted for the Revenue Departments. | The whole act. |
| 28 & 29 Vict. c. 93 | Comptroller of the Exchequer, etc. Act 1865 | An Act to consolidate the Offices of Comptroller General of the Exchequer and Chairman of the Commissioners for auditing the Public Accounts, and for other Purposes. | The whole act. |
