= Bute Docks Feeder =

Canal in Cardiff, Wales

Coordinates: 51°28′22″N 3°09′51″W

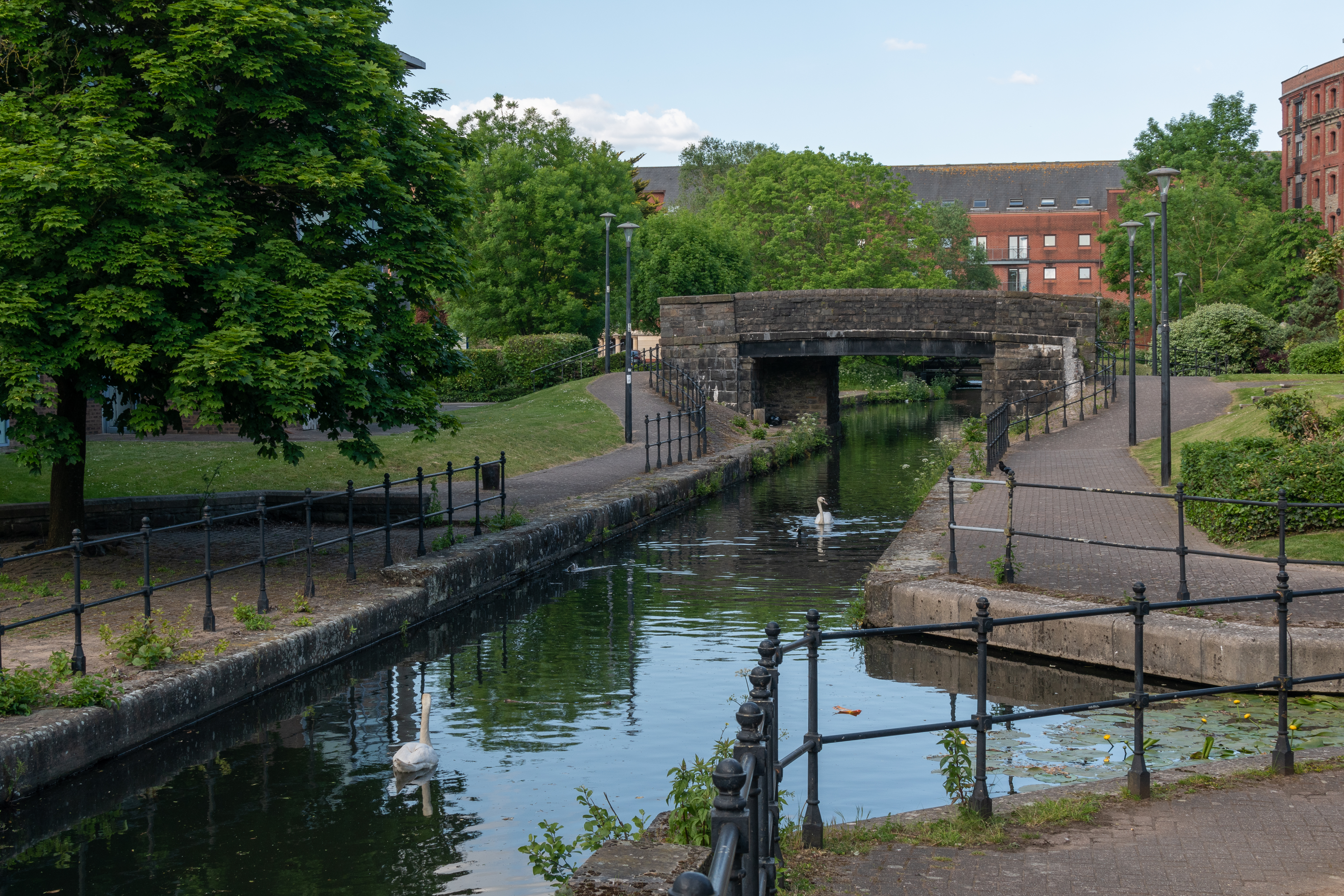
Dock Feeder Canal passing through Atlantic Wharf

The Bute Docks Feeder is a canal in Cardiff, Wales, constructed to provide a water source for the Cardiff docks.

== Background ==
Bute Ship Canal Act 1830
- Act of Parliament
- Parliament of the United Kingdom
- Long title: An Act for empowering the Marquis of Bute, to make and maintain a Ship Canal commencing near the mouth of the River Taff, in the County of Glamorgan, and terminating near the Town of Cardiff, with other Works to communicate therewith.
- Citation: 11 Geo. 4 & 1 Will. 4. c. cxxxiii

Dates
- Royal assent: 16 July 1830

Text of statute as originally enacted

In July 1830 the Bute Ship Canal Act 1830 (11 Geo. 4 & 1 Will. 4. c. cxxxiii) was passed allowing the Marquis of Bute to construct the Bute Ship Canal, a mile-long body of water connecting the sea to the Glamorganshire Canal. The Ship Canal was to be supplied with water via a feeder canal diverted from the River Taff, half a mile north of Cardiff Castle and running through the town. The feeder canal took about five years to complete, in the run up to the completion of the new dock in 1839 (in 1835 it was reported to have already been extended past Cardiff Castle and into the Crockherbtown area of town).

The Bute East Dock was completed in 1859, with the dock feeder extended in the 1850s to provide water for the new dock.

The Corporation Baths were built on Guildford Crescent in 1862, whose swimming pools drew 1 million gallons of water from the dock feeder, which ran alongside it.

In 1945, Cardiff Corporation applied for permission to culvert over the dock feeder between Queen Street and Bute Terrace, which would create a wide new road - named Churchill Way in 1949 after the work had been completed.

== Description ==
The feeder canal is diverted from the River Taff at Blackweir and follows a three and half mile route from this point to its destination at the Cardiff docks.

The canal provides approximately 50 million gallons of water each day to keep the docks full.

== Churchill Way Canal Quarter ==
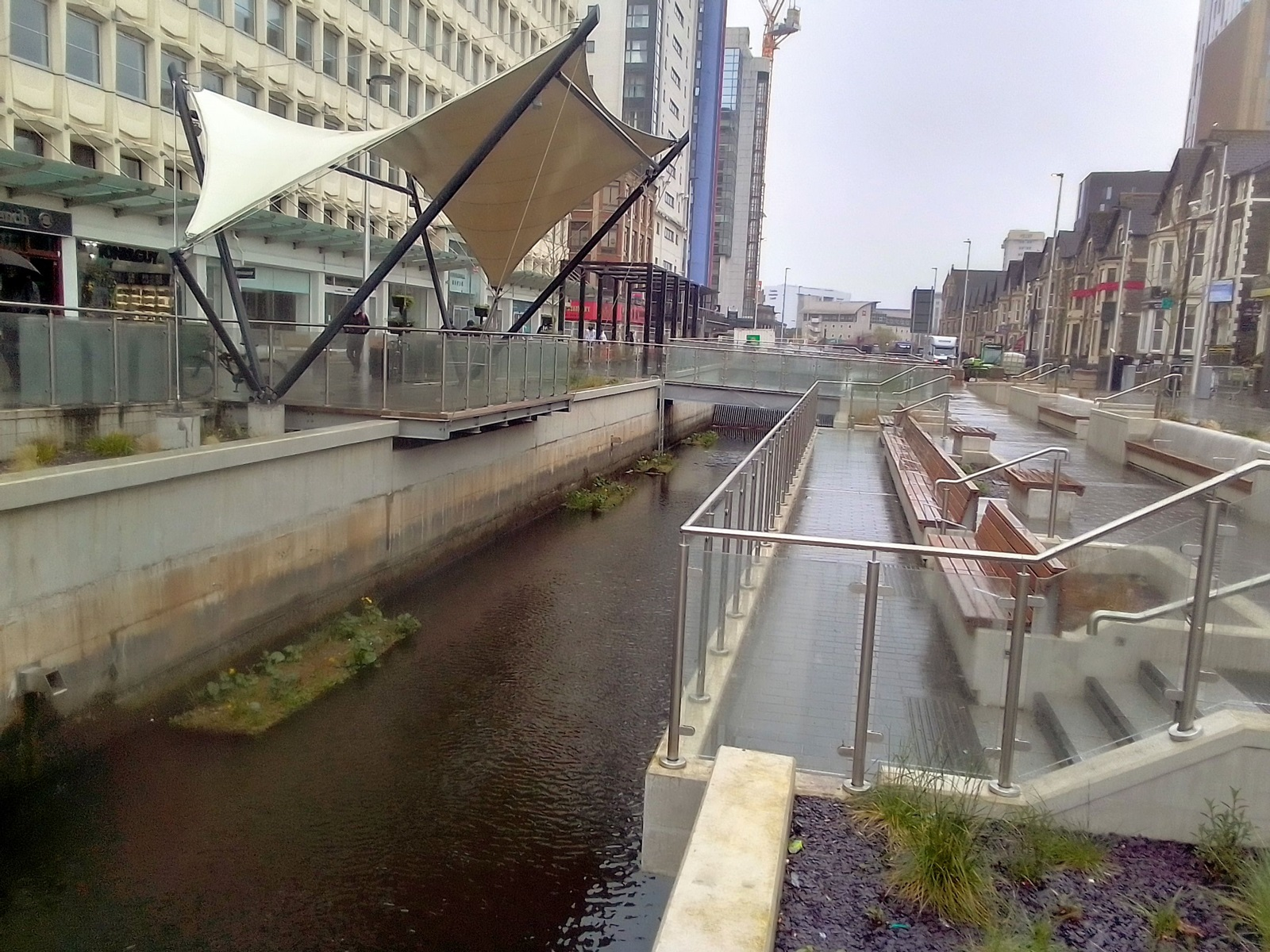
Churchill Way feeder canal (April 2024)

Plans were underway in 2022 to create a 'Canal Quarter' in the east of Cardiff city centre, with work was carried out to uncover the feeder canal in Churchill Way. Sixty-nine of the concrete beams were removed from above the canal, creating a new leisure area around the stretch of canal, which was officially opened in November 2023.
