= Superannuation Act 1834 =

Act of the Parliament of the United Kingdom

Superannuation Act 1834 (Note: This short title was conferred on this act by section 13 of the Superannuation Act 1887 (50 & 51 Vict. c. 67).) (Note: The citation of this act by this short title was authorised by section 1 of, and the first schedule to, the Short Titles Act 1896. Due to the repeal of those provisions it is now authorised by section 19(2) of the Interpretation Act 1978.)
- Act of Parliament
- Parliament of the United Kingdom
- Long title: An Act to alter, amend, and consolidate the Laws for regulating the Pensions, Compensations, and Allowances to be made to Persons in respect of their having held Civil Offices in His Majesty's Service.
- Citation: 4 & 5 Will. 4. c. 24
- Territorial extent: United Kingdom

Dates
- Royal assent: 25 July 1834
- Commencement: 25 July 1834 (Note: Section 1.)
- Repealed: 8 December 1965
Other legislation
Amends	Consular Advances Act 1825
Repeals/revokes	Public Salaries, etc. Act 1810; Grants of Pensions Act 1811; Public Salaries, etc. Act 1822; Superannuation Allowances Act 1824
Amended by	Superannuation Act Amendment Act 1834; Civil Service Superannuation Act 1857; Political Offices Pension Act 1869Statute Law Revision Act 1874; Superannuation Act 1887; Statute Law Revision Act 1890; Statute Law Revision Act 1950; Statute Law Revision Act 1964
Repealed by	Superannuation Act 1965
Relates to	Suitors in Chancery Relief Act 1852

Status: Repealed

Text of statute as originally enacted

Superannuation Act Amendment Act 1834
- Act of Parliament
- Parliament of the United Kingdom
- Long title: An Act to amend an Act of the present Session, for altering and consolidating the Laws for regulating the Pensions and Allowances to Persons in respect of their having held Civil Offices in His Majesty's Service.
- Citation: 4 & 5 Will. 4. c. 45
- Territorial extent: United Kingdom

Dates
- Royal assent: 13 August 1834
- Commencement: 13 August 1834 (Note: The Acts of Parliament (Commencement) Act 1793.)
- Repealed: 18 July 1874
Other legislation
Amends	Superannuation Act 1834
Repealed by	Statute Law Revision Act 1874

Status: Repealed

Text of statute as originally enacted

The Superannuation Act 1834 (4 & 5 Will. 4. c. 24) was an act of the Parliament of the United Kingdom updating 1817 and 1834 acts regarding pensions for high-ranking civil servants.

It reduced:

- those for First Lord of the Treasury, president of the India Board or Committee for Trade and Plantations, Chancellor of the Exchequer or any principal Secretary of State to a maximum of £2,000 a year, with a minimum of two years' total service (section 1).
- those for Chief Secretary for Ireland and Secretary at War to £400 a year, with a minimum of five years' total service (section 2)
- those for a Joint Secretary of the Treasury, a First Secretary of the Admiralty or vice-president of the Committee for Trade and Plantations to £1,200 a year, with a minimum of five years' total service (section 3)
- those for an Under-Secretary of State, a Clerk of the Ordnance, Second Secretary of the Admiralty, or Secretary of the India Board to £1,000, with a minimum of ten years' total service

It also forbade combining any of the four above pensions (sections 1–4) unless he had served 3–5 years in the highest of two or more of those offices and 10 years in total, in which case he would be allowed £1,000 a year (section 5). It also required the applicant for any pension covered by the act to apply to the Treasury for it with proof that his income was so low that he needed the pension (section 6). The remainder of the act set out pensions for clerks and "officers" in the civil service.

== Subsequent developments ==
Section 9 of the act was repealed by section 1(1) of, and the first schedule to, the Statute Law Revision Act 1950 (14 Geo. 6. c. 6), which came into force on 23 May 1950.

The whole act was repealed by section 104(2) of, and schedule 11 to, the Superannuation Act 1965, which came into force on 8 December 1965.
