= Superannuation Act 2010 =

Act of the Parliament of the United Kingdom

Superannuation Act 2010 (Note: Section 4(1).)
- Act of Parliament
- Parliament of the United Kingdom
- Long title: An Act to make provision for and in connection with limiting the value of the benefits which may be provided under so much of any scheme under section 1 of the Superannuation Act 1972 as provides by virtue of section 2(2) of that Act for benefits to be provided by way of compensation to or in respect of persons who suffer loss of office or employment; and to make provision about the procedure for modifying such a scheme.
- Citation: 2010 c. 37
- Introduced by: Francis Maude MP, Minister for the Cabinet Office and Paymaster General (Commons); Lord Wallace of Saltaire (Lords)
- Territorial extent: United Kingdom

Dates
- Royal assent: 16 December 2010
- Commencement: Sections 1, 3 and 4: 16 December 2010; Section 2: 16 February 2011; (Note: Section 4(2) and (3).)
Other legislation
Amends	Superannuation Act 1972
Amended by	Superannuation Act 2010 (Repeal of Limits on Compensation) Order 2010

Status: Partially repealed

History of passage through Parliament

Text of statute as originally enacted

Text of the Superannuation Act 2010 as in force today (including any amendments) within the United Kingdom, from legislation.gov.uk.

The Superannuation Act 2010 (c. 37) is an act of the Parliament of the United Kingdom. It caps the redundancy payouts to civil servants at 15 months' salary. Initially the proposal was for a maximum of 12 months' salary. This was raised during the passage of the bill to 15 months in the case of voluntary redundancy.

It was introduced in the House of Commons on 15 July 2010, and received its third reading there on 13 October. The act was given royal assent on 16 December 2010 and passed into law. There had been considerable political controversy surrounding the act and its provisions and it was considerably amended during its passage through Parliament.

Under the previous Civil Service Compensation Scheme (CSCS), civil servants received, on average, redundancy pay-offs equivalent to three years' pay, with some senior civil servants eligible for severance packages worth six years' salary. Cabinet Office minister Francis Maude described this as completely "untenable" and "massively out of kilter with the public sector", and said that the act's effort to cap these redundancy payments was "an inevitable consequence of current economic circumstances". Mark Serwotka, general secretary for the Public and Commercial Services Union, said that "the government wants to lay waste to our members' jobs and livelihoods more cheaply". Legal challenge in Europe was also threatened.

The dispute over redundancy payments is long-standing, and under previous rules, in order to change the CSCS an agreement was needed with all six civil service unions. The Superannuation Act 2010 amended the Superannuation Act 1972, in order to limit redundancy payouts and to end the absolute requirement for an agreement with trade unions in relation to redundancy payments.

The act was hardly in place before the maximum figure for redundancy payouts was repealed and higher levels announced.

In a written statement on 21 December 2010, Francis Maude advised Parliament that we "are now in a position to be able to repeal the caps set out in the Act through the Superannuation Act 2010 (Repeal of Limits on Compensation) Order 2010, which comes into force today. The repeal means that the statutory caps of a maximum of 15 months' pay for voluntary departures and 12 months' pay for compulsory departures, will not apply to the new civil service compensation scheme that is starting on 22 December 2010."

The key elements of the final compensation scheme for voluntary redundancy, if below normal pension age (either aged 60 or 65), were for one month's pay per year of service up to 21 months (previously 15 months) with a taper of between a maximum of 21 months' and six months' compensation for those approaching pension age, and for those at or above normal pension age, one month's pay per year of service up to a maximum of six months.

== Subsequent developments ==
Section 3, which set the limits on compensation benefits, was repealed by article 2 of the Superannuation Act 2010 (Repeal of Limits on Compensation) Order 2010 (SI 2010/2996), with effect from 21 December 2010.

== See also ==
- Superannuation Act
