= Superannuation Act 1965 =

Act of the Parliament of the United Kingdom

Superannuation Act 1965 (Note: Section 106.)
- Act of Parliament
- Parliament of the United Kingdom
- Long title: An Act to consolidate the Superannuation Acts 1834 to 1965 and certain other enactments relating to the superannuation of civil servants and other persons employed in the civil service of the State.
- Citation: 1965 c. 74
- Territorial extent: United Kingdom

Dates
- Royal assent: 8 November 1965
- Commencement: 8 December 1965 (Note: Section 106.)
Other legislation
Amends	See § Repealed enactments
Repeals/revokes	See § Repealed enactments
Amended by	Pensions (Increase) Act 1971; Superannuation Act 1972; Statute Law (Repeals) Act 1993; Statute Law (Repeals) Act 1998; Countryside and Rights of Way Act 2000; Natural Environment and Rural Communities Act 2006

Status: Partially repealed

Text of statute as originally enacted

Revised text of statute as amended

Text of the Superannuation Act 1965 as in force today (including any amendments) within the United Kingdom, from legislation.gov.uk.

The Superannuation Act 1965 (c. 74) is an act of the Parliament of the United Kingdom that consolidated enactments related to superannuation of civil servants and other persons employed in the civil service of the State.

== Provisions ==
=== Repealed enactments ===
Section 104(2) of the act repealed 18 enactments, listed in the schedule 11 to the act.

Citation	Short title	Extent of repeal
4 & 5 Will. 4. c. 24	Superannuation Act 1834	The whole act.
22 Vict. c. 26	Superannuation Act 1859	The whole act.
50 & 51 Vict. c. 67	Superannuation Act 1887	The whole act.
9 Edw. 7. c. 10	Superannuation Act 1909	The whole act.
4 & 5 Geo. 5. c. 86	Superannuation Act 1914	The whole act.
19 Geo. 5. c. 11	Superannuation (Diplomatic Service) Act 1929	The whole act.
25 & 26 Geo. 5. c. 23	Superannuation Act 1935	Sections 1 to 4, 6 to 8, 12, 13 and 16. In section 17 the words from "the expression", where first occurring, to "certificate and". In section 18(1) the words from "and", where first occurring, to the end of the subsection.
6 & 7 Geo. 6. c. 35	Foreign Service Act 1943	The whole act.
9 & 10 Geo. 6. c. 60	Superannuation Act 1946	Sections 1 to 4. In section 5, subsections (1) and (2) and, in subsection (3), the words from "by", where first occurring, to "1935 and". Section 6(2) and (3). Section 9(1). In section 10(1) the words from "and except" to the end. Schedules 1 and 2.
11 & 12 Geo. 6. c. 33	Superannuation (Miscellaneous Provisions) Act 1948	In section 1(1), paragraph (a) and the words from "for the purposes", where first occurring, to "capacity". Section 1(2). In section 1(3) the words "in relation to the Superannuation Acts, 1834 to 1946, be made by the Treasury" and the words "by or". Section 1(4). Sections 3 and 4. In section 17(1) the definition of "service to the State in an unestablished capacity".
12, 13 & 14 Geo. 6. c. 44	Superannuation Act 1949	Parts I, II and III. Sections 45, 46 and 47. Section 48(5). Sections 50, 51, 54 and 55. Sections 57 to 61. Section 62(1)(a) and (2). Section 63 except the definition of "the Superannuation Acts" in subsection (1). In section 64(1) the words from "and the" to the end. Schedules 1 and 2.
14 & 15 Geo. 6. c. 2	Superannuation Act 1950	Section 1(1). Section 2. In section 4, subsection (2) and the words in subsection (3) from "and this" to the end.
14 & 15 Geo. 6. c. 65	Reserve and Auxiliary Forces (Protection of Civil Interests) Act 1951	Section 41(3).
5 & 6 Eliz. 2. c. 37	Superannuation Act 1957	The whole act.
8 & 9 Eliz. 2. c. 11	Foreign Service Act 1960	The whole act.
9 & 10 Eliz. 2. c. 15	Post Office Act 1961	In section 15(1), the words from the beginning to "Fund; and".
1963 c. 24	British Museum Act 1963	Sections 6(3) and 13(4).
1965 c. 10	Superannuation (Amendment) Act 1965	Sections 1 to 3. In section 4, subsections (3) to (5) and, in subsection (6), the words "Sections 1 to 3 of this Act and". In section 5 the words "The Superannuation Acts". Sections 6 and 7. Section 8(1)(a) and (2)(a). In section 9(1) the words from "and the" to the end of the subsection. Section 9(2), (3) and (5). In Schedule 1 the entries relating to the Foreign Service Act 1943 and the Superannuation Act 1949. Schedule 2 except paragraphs 11 and 12(3) and (4), paragraph 24, so far as it relates to section 6 of the Administration of Justice (Pensions) Act 1950, and paragraph 26. Schedules 3 and 4.

== Subsequent developments ==
The majority of the act was repealed by section 29(4) of, and schedule 8 to, the Superannuation Act 1972 (c. 11), which came into force on 25 March 1972. The repeal extended to the whole act except sections 38, 39, 39A, 42(1), 95(1) and (2), 97(1) and (2)(a) and (c), 98, 104(1) and 106, schedule 8 and paragraphs 10 and 11 of schedule 10.
