= Statute Law Revision Act 1890 =

Act of the Parliament of the United Kingdom

Statute Law Revision Act 1890 (Note: Section 6.)
- Act of Parliament
- Parliament of the United Kingdom
- Long title: An Act for further promoting the Revision of the Statute Law by repealing Enactments which are superfluous or have ceased to be in force or have become unnecessary.
- Citation: 53 & 54 Vict. c. 33
- Introduced by: Hardinge Giffard, 1st Baron Halsbury (Lords)
- Territorial extent: United Kingdom

Dates
- Royal assent: 4 August 1890
- Commencement: 4 August 1890 (Note: The Acts of Parliament (Commencement) Act 1793.)
Other legislation
Amends	Statute Law Revision (No. 2) Act 1888; See § Repealed enactments
Repeals/revokes	See § Repealed enactments
Amended by	Statute Law Revision Act 1908; Courts Act 1971; Administration of Justice Act 1977
Relates to	Repeal of Obsolete Statutes Act 1856; Statute Law Revision Act 1861; Statute Law Revision Act 1863; Statute Law Revision Act 1867; Statute Law Revision Act 1870; Promissory Oaths Act 1871; Statute Law Revision Act 1871; Statute Law Revision Act 1872; Statute Law Revision Act 1872 (No. 2); Statute Law Revision (Ireland) Act 1872; Statute Law Revision Act 1873; Statute Law Revision Act 1874; Statute Law Revision Act 1874 (No. 2); Statute Law Revision Act 1875; Statute Law Revision (Substituted Enactments) Act 1876; Sheriffs Act 1887; Statute Law Revision Act 1878; Statute Law Revision (Ireland) Act 1878; Statute Law Revision (Ireland) Act 1879; Civil Procedure Acts Repeal Act 1879; Statute Law Revision and Civil Procedure Act 1881; Statute Law Revision and Civil Procedure Act 1883; Statute Law Revision Act 1883; Statute Law Revision Act 1887; Statute Law Revision Act 1888; Statute Law Revision (No. 2) Act 1888; Statute Law Revision (No. 2) Act 1890; Statute Law Revision Act 1891; Statute Law Revision Act 1892; Statute Law Revision Act 1893; Statute Law Revision Act 1894; Statute Law Revision Act 1898; Interpretation Act 1889; Statute Law Revision Act 2007 (Republic of Ireland)

Status: Partially repealed

History of passage through Parliament

Records of Parliamentary debate relating to the statute from Hansard

Text of statute as originally enacted

The Statute Law Revision Act 1890 (53 & 54 Vict. c. 33) is an act of the Parliament of the United Kingdom that repealed various United Kingdom enactments which had ceased to be in force or had become necessary. The act was intended, in particular, to facilitate the preparation of the new edition of the revised edition of the statutes, then in progress.

The act had been framed on the same lines as the Statute Law Revision Act 1888 (51 & 52 Vict. c. 3), except that it also repealed certain expressions made unnecessary by the passing of the Interpretation Act 1889 (52 & 53 Vict. c. 63).

The act was the first Statute Law Revision Act to pass both Houses of Parliament with opposition, on the ground that it sought to repeal enactments of the present reign without the authority of a select committee of the House of Commons.

== Background ==
In the United Kingdom, acts of Parliament remain in force until expressly repealed. Blackstone's Commentaries on the Laws of England, published in the late 18th-century, raised questions about the system and structure of the common law and the poor drafting and disorder of the existing statute book.

From 1810 to 1825, the The Statutes of the Realm was published, providing the first authoritative collection of acts. The first statute law revision act was not passed until 1856 with the Repeal of Obsolete Statutes Act 1856 (19 & 20 Vict. c. 64). This approach — focusing on removing obsolete laws from the statute book followed by consolidation — was proposed by Peter Locke King MP, who had been highly critical of previous commissions' approaches, expenditures, and lack of results.

Previous Acts
Year passed	Title	Citation	Effect
1861	Statute Law Revision Act 1861	24 & 25 Vict. c. 101	Repealed or amended over 800 enactments
1863	Statute Law Revision Act 1863	26 & 27 Vict. c. 125	Repealed or amended over 1,600 enactments for England and Wales
1867	Statute Law Revision Act 1867	30 & 31 Vict. c. 59	Repealed or amended over 1,380 enactments
1870	Statute Law Revision Act 1870	33 & 34 Vict. c. 69	Repealed or amended over 250 enactments
1871	Promissory Oaths Act 1871	34 & 35 Vict. c. 48	Repealed or amended almost 200 enactments
1871	Statute Law Revision Act 1871	34 & 35 Vict. c. 116	Repealed or amended over 1,060 enactments
1872	Statute Law Revision Act 1872	35 & 36 Vict. c. 63	Repealed or amended almost 490 enactments
1872	Statute Law (Ireland) Revision Act 1872	35 & 36 Vict. c. 98	Repealed or amended over 1,050 enactments
1872	Statute Law Revision Act 1872 (No. 2)	35 & 36 Vict. c. 97	Repealed or amended almost 260 enactments
1873	Statute Law Revision Act 1873	36 & 37 Vict. c. 91	Repealed or amended 1,225 enactments
1874	Statute Law Revision Act 1874	37 & 38 Vict. c. 35	Repealed or amended over 490 enactments
1874	Statute Law Revision Act 1874 (No. 2)	37 & 38 Vict. c. 96	Repealed or amended almost 470 enactments
1875	Statute Law Revision Act 1875	38 & 39 Vict. c. 66	Repealed or amended over 1,400 enactments
1876	Statute Law Revision (Substituted Enactments) Act 1876	39 & 40 Vict. c. 20	Updated references to repealed acts
1878	Statute Law Revision (Ireland) Act 1878	41 & 42 Vict. c. 57	Repealed or amended over 460 enactments passed by the Parliament of Ireland
1878	Statute Law Revision Act 1878	41 & 42 Vict. c. 79	Repealed or amended over 90 enactments.
1879	Statute Law Revision (Ireland) Act 1879	42 & 43 Vict. c. 24	Repealed or amended over 460 enactments passed by the Parliament of Ireland
1879	Civil Procedure Acts Repeal Act 1879	42 & 43 Vict. c. 59	Repealed or amended over 130 enactments
1881	Statute Law Revision and Civil Procedure Act 1881	44 & 45 Vict. c. 59	Repealed or amended or amended almost 100 enactments relating to civil procedure.
1883	Statute Law Revision Act 1883	46 & 47 Vict. c. 39	Repealed or amended over 475 enactments
1883	Statute Law Revision and Civil Procedure Act 1883	46 & 47 Vict. c. 49	Repealed or amended over 475 enactments
1887	Statute Law Revision Act 1887	50 & 51 Vict. c. 59	Repealed or amended over 200 enactments
1887	Sheriffs Act 1887	50 & 51 Vict. c. 55	Repealed or amended almost 75 enactments related to sheriffs
1887	Coroners Act 1887	50 & 51 Vict. c. 71	Repealed or amended over 30 enactments related to coroners
1888	Statute Law Revision Act 1888	51 & 52 Vict. c. 3	Repealed or amended 620 enactments
1888	Statute Law Revision (No. 2) Act 1888	51 & 52 Vict. c. 57	Repealed or amended ? enactments
1889	Master and Servant Act 1889	52 & 53 Vict. c. 24	Repealed or amended over 20 enactments related to master and servants

In 1889, the Interpretation Act 1889 (52 & 53 Vict. c. 63) was passed, which generalised definitions used in acts of Parliament and provided rules of statutory construction. This rendered enactments unnecessary, for example the words "the Commissioners of Her Majesty's" before the word "Treasury" or the words "heirs and successors" after reference to the monarch.

== Passage ==
The Statute Law Revision Bill was first introduced in 1889 and had its first reading in the House of Lords on 26 July 1889, introduced by the Lord Chancellor, Hardinge Giffard, 1st Baron Halsbury. The bill had its second reading in the House of Lords on 1 August 1889 and was committed to a committee of the whole house, which met and reported on 8 August 1889, with amendments.

The amended bill had its first reading in the House of Commons on 9 August 1889. The bill was withdrawn in the last week of the session, on 16 August 1889, following opposition on the ground that it sought to repeal enactments of the present reign without the authority of a select committee of the House of Commons. This led to delays in the publication of the new edition of the revised edition of the statutes.

On 14 February 1890, the Attorney General, Richard Webster MP, confirmed the intention of the government to re-introduce the bill. The re-introduced Statute Law Revision Bill had its first reading in the House of Lords on 20 February 1890, introduced by the Lord Chancellor, Hardinge Giffard, 1st Earl of Halsbury. The bill had its second reading in the House of Lords on 3 March 1890 and was committed to a committee of the whole house, which met and reported on 6 March 1890, with amendments. The amended bill had its third reading in the House of Lords on 10 March 1890 and passed, without amendments.

The bill had its first reading in the House of Commons on 11 March 1890. The bill had its second reading in the House of Commons on 17 March 1890 and was committed to the Select Committee on the Statute Law Revision Bill. which reported on 5 May 1890, with amendments.

The select committee reported that:

...they desire to express their sense of the great caution and accuracy with which the Bill has been prepared, and their opinion that the Statute Law Committee and its assistants have fully justified the confidence which has been shown in them by both Houses of Parliament.
In examining the statutes in order to consider the verbal amendments proposed, your committee came to the conclusion that the process of revision might be safely made much more extensive and valuable by the repeal of such of the preambles of these Acts as, having regard to the provisions of the third section of this Bill, were not required for the purpose of explaining or interpreting the Acts to which they were prefixed, and were not of any such historical interest and importance as to make it desirable that they should be reprinted in future and revised editions of the statutes."

The select committee supported removing unnecessary formal language and eliminating historically unimportant preambles from the revised edition of the statutes. The select committee also reported that many still unrepealed statutes, especially as well as to many acts of the Parliament of Ireland before the Union or those repealed for England and Wales only, could be repealed for Scotland and Ireland, and recommended unifying future repeals across the three jurisdictions of the United Kingdom.

The amended bill was re-committed to a Committee of the Whole House on 5 May 1890, which met on 12 May 1890 and expressed support of the recommendations made by the select committee. The committee met again on 2 July 1890 (following a number of deferrals) and 14 July 1890, during which an attempt to repeal the Justices of the Peace Act 1361 (34 Edw. 3. c. 1) and a motion by Frederick Cornwallis Conybeare MP to report progress was rejected. The committee reported on 14 July 1890, with amendments. The amended bill had had its third reading in the House of Commons on 14 July 1890 and passed, with amendments. During debate, an objection to the third reading made by Dr Charles Kearns Deane Tanner MP was rejected.

The amended bill was considered by the House of Lords on 28 July 1890, who agreed to some amendments, disagreed with others and made some consequential amendments. The report of the select committee was adopted by the House of Lords after consideration by leading legal peers, including Lord Thring and Lord Herschell, and consultation with the Statute Law Committee. This resulted in amendments to the bill to authorise the omission, not repeal, of certain preambles and the addition of words to preambles into the revised edition of the statutes. A committee was appointed to report reasons to the House of Commons, which reported on 28 July 1890.

The report was received by the House of Commons on 29 July 1890, and the amended bill was considered and agreed to by the House of Commons on 1 August 1890.

The bill was granted royal assent on 4 August 1890.

== Subsequent developments ==
The repeals of preambles by section 1 of the act was criticised by legal writers after the passing, who described the "slaughter" as "quite unwise".

Sections 2 and 5 of, and the first and second schedules to, the act was repealed by section 1 of, and the schedule to, the Statute Law Revision Act 1908 (8 Edw. 7. c. 49)), which came into force on 21 December 1908.

The words "to the court of the county palatine of Lancaster or" in section 4 of the act were repealed by section 56(4) of, and part II of schedule 11 to, the Courts Act 1971, which came into force on 1 January 1972.

Section 4 of the act was repealed by section 32(4) of, and part V of schedule 5 to, the Administration of Justice Act 1977, which came into force on 29 July 1977.

The act was retained for the Republic of Ireland by section 2(2)(a) of, and part 4 of schedule 1 to, the Statute Law Revision Act 2007, which came into force on 8 May 2007.

The act was partly in force in Great Britain at the end of 2010.

== Repealed enactments ==
Section 1 of the act repealed 262 enactments, listed in the first schedule to the act, across six categories: (Note: The Note of the bill, unlike the schedule, gives commentary on each act, noting any earlier repeals and the reason for the new repeal.)

- Expired
- Spent
- Repealed in general terms
- Virtually repealed
- Superseded
- Obsolete

Section 1 of the act also provided that parts of titles, preambles, or recitals specified after the words "In part, namely" in connection with acts mentioned in the first schedule to the act could be omitted from any revised edition of the statutes published by authority, with brief statements about the acts, officers, persons, and things mentioned in those titles/preambles/recitals being added as necessary.

Section 3 of the act provided that repeals were subject to the standard Westbury Saving.

Section 4 of the act provided that if any repealed enactment had been applied to the Court of the County Palatine of Lancaster or other inferior civil courts, such enactment would be construed as if it were contained in a local and personal act specifically relating to that court, and would have effect accordingly.

Section 5 of the act provided that the Statute Law Revision (No. 2) Act 1888 (51 & 52 Vict. c. 57) was to be read and construed as if, in the entry in the schedule to that act relating to the Assizes (Ireland) Act 1835 (5 & 6 Will. 4. c. 26), the reference to sections 1 and 2 and 3 were replaced by reference to sections 2 and 3 and 4.

Citation	Short Title	Title	Extent of repeal
43 Geo. 3. c. 46	Costs Act 1803	An Act for the more effectual Prevention of frivolous and vexatious Arrests and Suits; and to authorise the levying of Poundage upon Executions in certain Cases.	The whole act.
43 Geo. 3. c. 59	Bridges Act 1803	An Act for remedying certain Defects in the Laws relative to the building and repairing of County Bridges, and other Works maintained at the Expence of the Inhabitants of Counties in England.	So much as extends and applies any provisions of 13 Geo. 3. c. 78. other than sections six to fourteen, sixteen, eighteen, twenty-seven to thirty-three, forty-nine, fifty, seventy-two to eighty-one, and forms eleven, twelve, twenty-three, and twenty-four, in the schedule.
45 Geo. 3. c. 89	Bank Notes (Forgery) Act 1805	An Act the title of which begins with the words "An Act to alter" and ends with the words "Great Britain."	Preamble. The words "from and after the passing of this Act" and "and shall suffer death as a felon without benefit of clergy," wherever they occur.
47 Geo. 3 Sess. 2. c. 68	India Government, etc. Act 1807	An Act the title of which begins with the words "An Act for the better" and ends with the words "Service Abroad."	Repealed as to all Her Majesty's dominions.
48 Geo. 3. c. 140	Dublin Police Magistrates Act 1808	An Act the title of which begins with the words "An Act for the more" and ends with the words "Dublin Metropolis."	Sections forty-seven and forty-eight.
48 Geo. 3. c. 149	Probate and Legacy Duties Act 1808	An Act the title of which begins with the words "An Act for repealing" and ends with the words "Duties in lieu thereof."	Section forty, from "and the Stamp Duty" to the end of the section.
50 Geo. 3. c. 31	Session Court (Scotland) Act 1810	An Act the title of which begins with the words "An Act for augmenting" and ends with the words "in Ireland."	The whole act.
52 Geo. 3. c. 130	Malicious Damage Act 1812	An Act the title of which begins with the words "An Act for the" and ends with the words "injury sustained."	Section one, from "without benefit" where those words first occur to the end of the section. Section two, from "without benefit" where those words first occur to the end of the section.
52 Geo. 3. c. 143	Land Tax Certificates Forgery Act 1812	An Act the title of which begins with the words "An Act for amending" and ends with the words "Great Britain."	Section six, the words "and shall suffer death as a felon without benefit of clergy."
53 Geo. 3. c. 155	East India Company Act 1813	An Act the title of which begins with the words "An Act for continuing," and ends with the words "Company's Charter."	Sections ninety-seven to one hundred and ten. Section one hundred and twenty-four. Repealed as to all Her Majesty's dominions.
54 Geo. 3. c. 15	New South Wales (Debts) Act 1813	An Act for the more easy Recovery of Debts in His Majesty's Colony of New South Wales.	The whole Act so far as it extends to the colony of Victoria.
55 Geo. 3. c. 42	Jury Trials (Scotland) Act 1815	An Act the title of which begins with the words "An Act to facilitate" and ends with the words "Civil Causes."	Preamble. Section one to "civil causes." Section twelve, to "passing of this Act," from "his heirs" to "this Act," and the words "her heirs and successors." Section twenty, the word "stewart." Section twenty-five, the word "stewart," and from "immediately after" to "afterwards." Section twenty-six, the words "or steward." Section twenty-seven, the words "or stewart." Section twenty-nine, the word "stewart."
55 Geo. 3. c. 50	Gaol Fees Abolition Act 1815	An Act for the Abolition of Gaol and other Fees connected with the Gaols in England.	Preamble. Section one, to "October next." Section four, to "enacted that" and the words "now is or hereafter." Sections six to eight, eleven and twelve, except as to any officers therein referred to appointed before the 8th August 1845. Section nine, to "this Act." Section thirteen, to "that," and the words "from and after the first day of October next."
55 Geo. 3. c. 70	Court of Session (Records) Act 1815	An Act for better regulating the Formation and Arrangement of the Judicial and other Records of the Court of Session in Scotland.	Preamble. Section one, to "of the same that" and the words "from and after the passing of this Act." Section three, from "and the said keeper," to the end of the section. Section four, the words "from and after the twelfth day of November next," and from "in the following" to "assistant keepers."
55 Geo. 3. c. 72	Glamorganshire Election Act 1815	An Act to fix the Election for Glamorganshire at a central place within the said County.	The whole act.
55 Geo. 3. c. 89	Court Houses (Ireland) Act 1815	An Act the title of which begins with the words "An Act to amend" and ends with the words "in Ireland."	Preamble. Section one, from "whether erected" to "or not," and the words "or the commission of oyer and terminer."
55 Geo. 3. c. 91	Criminal Costs (Dublin) Act 1815	An Act for the Payment of Costs and Charges to Prosecutors and Witnesses in cases of Felony in Ireland.	Section two, to "enacted that." Section three, to "enacted that."
55 Geo. 3. c. 94	Herring Fishery (Scotland) Act 1815	An Act to continue and amend several Acts relating to the British White Herring Fishery.	Preamble. Section one, to "of the same that" and from "from the first" to "and fifteen." Section nine, the words "the lords commissioners of." Section twelve, to "and sixteen," and the word "that" before "if any." Section thirteen, the words "be and they" and from "after the first" to "and sixteen." Section thirty-three, to "and sixteen." Section thirty-nine, to "this Act." Section forty-two, the words "of debt bill plaint" and the words "his heirs and successors."
55 Geo. 3. c. 114	Supreme Court (Ireland) (Master of the Rolls) Act 1815	An Act the title of which begins with the words "An Act to augment" and ends with the words "in Ireland."	The whole act.
55 Geo. 3. c. 115	Russian Dutch Loan Act 1815	An Act to carry into effect a Convention made between His Majesty and the King of the Netherlands and the Emperor of all the Russias.	Section one, from "the lord" to "commissioners of" and from "of Great Britain, or" to "they is and." Section two, to "commissioners of" and the words "for the time being." Section three, to "enacted that," from "the said lord" to "commissioners of," and from "or any" to "time being."
55 Geo. 3. c. 128	Admiralty (Signal Stations) Act 1815	An Act to enable His Majesty to acquire ground necessary for Signal and Telegraph stations.	Section two, the words "the lords commissioners of." Section three, the words "the said lords commissioners of" and "his heirs and successors." Section four, the word "stewartry" wherever it occurs. Section five, the words "or sittings of nisi prius" and the words "or sittings" where they twice occur. Section nine, the words "his heirs and successors."
55 Geo. 3. c. 137	Poor Relief Act 1815	An Act the title of which begins with the words "An Act to prevent," and ends with the words "to the Poor."	Preamble. Section one, to "of the same that." Section six, to "passing of this Act" and the words "of debt or on the case," and from "in which action" to "be allowed."
55 Geo. 3. c. 143	Bridges Act 1815	An Act to amend the Acts relating to the building and repairing of County Bridges.	Preamble. Section one, to "passing of this Act," the words "appointed or," and from "at the passing" to "passing thereof."
55 Geo. 3. c. 184	Stamp Act 1815	An Act the title of which begins with the words "An Act for repealing" and ends with the words "in lieu thereof."	Preamble. Section two, the words "his heirs and successors" and from "and that all the other" to "and fifteen." Section twenty-four, the words "the governor and company of." Section twenty-seven, the words "the said governor and company of." Section thirty-nine. Sections forty and forty-one, except as to grants of probate and letters of administration made before the first of June one thousand eight hundred and eighty-one. Section forty-four, to "this Act." Section forty-eight, the words "his heirs or successors." Section fifty-one, the words "the commissioners of." The Schedule from "Part the Second" to "Lunacy." The Schedule, Part the Third, so much of the portion under head II. as relates to a duty of 1l. 0s. 0d. per cent., and the whole of Part the Third except as to Exemptions from all stamp duties and as to duties on Legacies and Successions, and except as to grants of probate and letters of administration made before the first of April one thousand eight hundred and eighty.
55 Geo. 3. c. 185	Plate Duties Act 1815	An Act the title of which begins with the words "An Act for repealing" and ends with the words "in lieu thereof."	Preamble. Section two, the words "his heirs and successors," and from "and that the duties" to "and fifteen" where those words lastly occur. Section seven, the words "his heirs or successors" twice occurring.
55 Geo. 3. c. 194	Apothecaries Act 1815	An Act for better regulating the Practice of Apothecaries throughout England and Wales.	Preamble, the words "for himself, his heirs and successors." Section fourteen, to "and fifteen," and the words "except persons already in practice as such." Section seventeen, from "from and after" to "and fifteen," and from "except the persons" to "aforesaid, and." Section twenty, the words "except such as are then actually practising as such," "after the said first day of August one thousand eight hundred and fifteen" (twice occurring), and "except such as are then acting as such, and." Section twenty-one, from "that he was" to "and fifteen, or." Section twenty-six, the words "or suit at law," and from "wherein no essoign" to "be allowed." Section twenty-nine, from "or of any person" to "and fifteen," and the words "and all such persons or person."
56 Geo. 3. c. 46	Civil List Audit Act 1816	An Act for the better Regulation of the Civil List.	The words "lord high treasurer, or the commissioners of his Majesty's," "for the time being, or any three or more of them," "lord high treasurer, or commissioners of the," "for the time being," "lord high treasurer, or commissioners of his Majesty's" and "the said lord high treasurer, or the commissioners of" wherever they occur. Section eight, to "enacted that." Section nine, from "as soon as" to "passing of this Act." Section ten, to "enacted that."
56 Geo. 3. c. 55	Canals (Ireland) Act 1816	An Act the title of which begins with the words "An Act to amend" and ends with the words "in Ireland."	Preamble, from "who should have." Section one, to "of the same that." The words "or other chief governor of Ireland for the time being" in the preamble and section one. Section four, to "this Act."
56 Geo. 3. c. 56	Probate Duty (Ireland) Act 1816	An Act the title of which begins with the words "An Act to repeal" and ends with the words "said Duties."	Section one hundred and seventeen, the words "in the form contained in the Schedule hereunto annexed." Section one hundred and eighteen. Sections one hundred and nineteen and one hundred and twenty, except as to grants of probate and letters of administration made before the first of June one thousand eight hundred and eighty-one. Section one hundred and twenty-three, the words "his heirs or successors." Section one hundred and twenty-six, the words "his heirs and successors." Section one hundred and thirty, the words "the governor and company of" and "the said governor and company of." The Schedule, Part the Third.
56 Geo. 3. c. 82	Vice-Admiralty Courts Act 1816	An Act to render valid the judicial Acts of Surrogates of Vice-Admiralty Courts abroad during Vacancies in Office of Judges of such Courts.	Repealed as to all Her Majesty's dominions.
56 Geo. 3. c. 98	Consolidated Fund Act 1816	An Act the title of which begins with the words "An Act to unite" and ends with the words "United Kingdom."	Section fifteen, to "and seventeen," from "or other chief" to "time being," the words "or other chief governor or governors of Ireland," and the words "or their." Section sixteen, to "Ireland, nor," the words "nor shall any such appointment," "vice-treasurer for Ireland, or," and "nor shall any of them." Section twenty-two, to "and eighteen."
56 Geo. 3. c. 116	Prisoner Act 1816	An Act the title of which begins with the words "An Act to explain" and ends with the words "in England."	The whole act.
56 Geo. 3. c. 120	Prisoners Returns (Ireland) Act 1816	An Act to procure Annual Returns of Persons committed, tried, and convicted for Criminal Offences, and Misdemeanors in Ireland.	The words "clerks of the sessions of oyer and terminer and gaol delivery," "of the lord lieutenant," "to the lord lieutenant," "or other chief governor or governors of Ireland for the time being," "sessions of oyer and terminer and gaol delivery," wherever they occur. Schedule, the words "or session of oyer and terminer."
56 Geo. 3. c. 125	Malicious Damage (Scotland) Act 1816	An Act the title of which begins with the words "An Act for the" and ends with the words "Injury sustained."	Preamble. Section one, to "of the same that," the words "after the passing of this Act," and from "without benefit" where those words first occur, to the end of the section. Section three, the words "or stewart" and "or stewartry."
56 Geo. 3. c. 139	Parish Apprentices Act 1816	An Act to regulate the binding of Parish Apprentices.	Preamble. Section two, from "at any time" to "October." Section seven, from "from and after" to "October." Section eight, the words "after the said first day of October." Section nine, from "from and after" to "and sixteen." Section ten, from "after the first" to "and sixteen." Section eleven, the words "after the said first day of October."
57 Geo. 3. c. 19	Seditious Meetings Act 1817	An Act for the more effectually preventing Seditious Meetings and Assemblies.	Section twenty-three, to "enacted that," and the word "that" before "if any." Section twenty-four. Section twenty-five, to "clubs and also" and the word "other" first occurring, the words "from and after the passing of this Act," twice occurring, and the words "after the passing of this Act." Sections twenty-nine and thirty, the word "stewartry." Section thirty-one, the words "his heirs and successors."
57 Geo. 3. c. 25	House Tax Act 1817	An Act the title of which begins with the words "An Act to explain," and ends with the words "by the said Act."	Preamble. Section one, to "and seventeen." Section four.
57 Geo. 3. c. 41	Paymaster General Act 1817	An Act the title of which begins with the words "An Act to repeal" and ends with the words "at War."	Preamble. Section two, to "shall cease."
57 Geo. 3. c. 56	Recognisances (Ireland) Act 1817	An Act to amend the Laws in respect to forfeited Recognizances in Ireland.	Preamble. Section two to "this Act." Section four, from "wherein no" to the end of the section. Section eighteen, the words "oyer and terminer, gaol delivery" and "or nisi prius." Section twenty-three, the words "his heirs and successors."
57 Geo. 3. c. 62	Public Offices (Ireland) Act 1817	An Act to abolish certain Offices and to regulate certain other Offices in Ireland.	The whole Act, except sections eight, ten, and eleven. Section eight, to "shall become vacant," from "or other" to "time being" where those words next occur, from "lord high" to "his Majesty's," and the words "for the time being" where they secondly occur. Section eleven, from "to the lord" to "of Ireland," and the words "for the time being" where they lastly occur.
57 Geo. 3. c. 64	Public Offices (Scotland) Act 1817	An Act to abolish certain Offices and regulate others in Scotland.	Preamble. Section one. Section two, from "lord high" to "Majesty's," and from "of the said United" to "more of them;" from "and in the next place" to "granted to him," and from "and if such fees" to the end of the section. Section three, to "become vacant," and the words "his heirs or successors." Section four, from "said lord" to "Majesty's," and from "for the time being, or," to "more of them." Section five, to "becoming vacant," from "and it shall not" to "per annum," from "said lord" to "Majesty's," and from "or any three" to "time being." Section six, from "said lord high" when first occurring, to "Majesty's," the words "or any three or more of them," twice occurring, from "and in the next place" to "office of lord register," and from "the said lord," where lastly occurring, to "commissioners of." Section nine. Section eleven, the words "the said lord high treasurer or commissioners of," twice occurring, and from "or any three" to "time being," and the whole section, except as to the office of clerk to the admission of notaries in Scotland. Section thirteen, the words "said commissioners of his Majesty's."
57 Geo. 3. c. 87	Excise Drawback Act 1817	An Act the title of which begins with the words "An Act to amend" and ends with the words "of smuggling."	Section eleven, to "enacted, that," and the word "that" before "the exporter." Section twelve, to "enacted, that." Section thirteen to "enacted, that," the word "that" before "one moiety," and the words "his heirs and successors."
57 Geo. 3. c. 91	Clerks of the Peace (Fees) Act 1817	An Act the title of which begins with the words "An Act to enable" and ends with the words "England and Wales."	Preamble. Section one. Section two, the words "of debt, bill, plaint," and from "wherein no essoign" to the end of the section. Section three, the words "of debt, bill, plaint," and from "wherein no essoign" to the end of the section.
57 Geo. 3. c. 100	Land Tax Redemption Act 1817	An Act the title of which begins with the words "An Act to renew" and ends with the words "Land Tax."	Preamble. The words "the governor and company of" in sections seventeen and twenty-three.
58 Geo. 3. c. 29	Fees for Pardons Act 1818	An Act for regulating the Payment of Fees for Pardons under the Great Seal.	Preamble. Section one, to "passing of this Act," the words "his heirs and successors," the word "that," from "lords" to "Majesty's," and from "of the United" to "Ireland." Section two, to "this Act."
58 Geo. 3. c. 30	Costs Act 1818	An Act for preventing frivolous and vexatious Actions of Assault and Battery, and for slanderous Words in Courts.	Preamble. Section one, to "passing of this Act," and from "the court of great" where first occurring, to "of Durham."
58 Geo. 3. c. 45	Church Building Act 1818	The Church Building Act, 1818.	Preamble. Section thirty-four, the words "his Majesty's" where first occurring, "forests and land revenues," from "lord high" to "Majesty's," and from "of the United" to "more of them."
58 Geo. 3. c. 47	Hospitals (Ireland) Act 1818	An Act the title of which begins with the words "An Act to establish" and ends with the words "in Ireland."	Preamble. Section one, to "the passing of this Act." The words "from and after the passing of this Act" in section five. Section eight, the words "or other chief governor or governors" thrice occurring, the words "of Ireland," "or their," and "for the time being."
59 Geo. 3. c. 25	Freight for Treasure Act 1819	An Act the title of which begins with the words "An Act to enable" and ends with the words "and Vessels."	To "passing of this Act," the words "his heirs and successors," the words "his heirs or successors" twice occurring, and the word "that" wherever it occurs.
59 Geo. 3. c. 27	Felony Act 1819	An Act the title of which begins with the words "An Act to facilitate" and ends with the words "Inland Navigations."	To "passing of this Act," the words "pains of death, and other" and from "or of any commission" to the end of the Act.
59 Geo. 3. c. 38	North American Fisheries Act 1819	An Act the title of which begins with the words "An Act to enable" and ends with the words "of America."	The words "from and after the passing of this Act" in sections one and two. Section four, the words "his heirs and successors."
59 Geo. 3. c. 76	Bank of England Act 1819	An Act the title of which begins with the words "An Act to establish" and ends with the words "said Bank."	Preamble. The words "the governor and company of" and "the said governor and company of" wherever they occur. Section one, to "this Act" and the words "his heirs or successors."
59 Geo. 3. c. 85	Vestries Act 1819	An Act to amend and correct an Act of the last Session of Parliament for the Regulation of Parish Vestries in England.	Preamble. Section one, to "this Act." Section three, to "further enacted, that."
59 Geo. 3. c. 94	Crown Land Act 1819	An Act the title of which begins with the words "An Act to explain" and ends with the words "and Successors."	Title, the words "His Heirs and Successors." Preamble. Section one, to "of the same that," and the word "that" before "it shall be lawful." The words "his heirs and successors" and "his heirs or successors" wherever they occur, the word "respectively" where it occurs following the words last repealed, and the words "or their" occurring before "sign manual."
59 Geo. 3. c. 134	Church Building Act 1819	The Church Building Act, 1819.	Preamble. Section twenty, the words "his Majesty's" where first occurring, the words "forests and land revenues," from "lord high" to "Majesty's," and from "of the United" to "more of them." Section twenty-four, to "passing of this Act."
60 Geo. 3. & 1 Geo. 4. c. 1	Unlawful Drilling Act 1819	An Act to prevent the training of Persons to the Use of Arms, and to the Practice of Military Evolutions and Exercise.	The words "or of any stewartry," in section one, and the word "stewartry" in section three.
60 Geo. 3. & 1 Geo. 4. c. 8	Criminal Libel Act 1819	An Act for the more effectual Prevention and Punishment of blasphemous and seditious Libels.	Preamble. Section one, to "passing of this Act" and the words "his heirs or successors, or the Regent."
60 Geo. 3. & 1 Geo. 4. c. 11	Parliamentary Elections (Ireland) Act 1820	An Act for the better Regulation of Polls, and for making further Provision touching the Election of Members to serve in Parliament for Ireland.	Preamble. Section four.
1 Geo. 4. c. 5	Transfer of Stock (Ireland) Act 1820	An Act the title of which begins with the words "An Act to enable" and ends with the words "Party thereto."	Title, the words "the Governor and Company of." Preamble. Section one, to "of the same that." The words "the governor and company of" in section four.
1 Geo. 4. c. 90	Offences at Sea Act 1820	An Act the title of which begins with the words "An Act to remove" and ends with the words "the Admiralty."	Preamble. Section one, to "of this Act."
1 Geo. 4. c. 92	Bank Notes Forgery (Scotland) Act 1820	An Act for the further Prevention of forging and counterfeiting of Bank Notes.	The words "from and after the passing of this Act" wherever they occur.
1 Geo. 4. c. 100	Militia (City of London) Act 1820	An Act the title of which begins with the words "An Act for amending" and ends with the words "City of London."	Preamble.
1 & 2 Geo. 4. c. 28	West Africa Act 1821	An Act the title of which begins with the words "An Act for abolishing" and ends with the words "held by them."	Preamble. Section one, to "on the said coast; and," and the words "his heirs and successors for ever." Section three, to "this Act."
1 & 2 Geo. 4. c. 31	Hereditary Revenues Act 1821	An Act for removing Doubts as to the Continuance of the Hereditary Revenue in Scotland.	The whole act.
1 & 2 Geo. 4. c. 33	Lunacy (Ireland) Act 1821	An Act the title of which begins with the words "An Act to make" and ends with the words "in Ireland."	Preamble, and section one to "of the same that." The words "or other chief governor or governors of Ireland" and "or other chief governor or governors" wherever they occur. Section two, the words "at any time after the passing of this Act." Section five, the words "and they." Section seven, the words "for the time being" (thrice occurring) and the words "or are."
1 & 2 Geo. 4. c. 36	Public Notaries (Ireland) Act 1821	An Act for the better Regulation of the Public Notaries in Ireland.	Preamble, and section one to "twenty-one." The words "from and after the said first day of July" and "after the said first day of July," wherever they occur. Section sixteen, the words "of debt, bill, plaint" and from "wherein no" to "allowed."
1 & 2 Geo. 4. c. 38	Court of Session Act 1821	An Act the title of which begins with the words "An Act for establishing" and ends with the words "the said Courts."	Preamble. Section one, to "of the same that." Section nine, to "this Act." Section ten, to "enacted that." Section eleven, to "enacted that," and from "from and after" to "present year," and from "and that" to "abolished." Section fourteen, to "quarterly and." Section twenty-three, to "enacted that." Section twenty-four, to "this Act." Section twenty-six, to "this Act." Section thirty-two, to "enacted that," the word "said" before "office of auditor," the words "his heirs and successors," wherever they occur, the word "that" before "upon, every," and the words "present auditor or any," and "henceforth to be appointed." Section thirty-three, to "summons; and."
1 & 2 Geo. 4. c. 44	House of Commons Disqualifications Act 1821	An Act to exclude Persons holding certain Judicial Offices in Ireland from being Members of the House of Commons.	Preamble. Section one. Section two, the words "stewartry," "town, cinque port," "after the passing of this Act," "of debt, bill, plaint," from "in which" to "imparleance," and the words "his heirs and successors."
1 & 2 Geo. 4. c. 53	Common Law Procedure (Ireland) Act 1821	An Act the title of which begins with the words "An Act to regulate," and ends with the words "in Ireland."	Preamble. Sections one to twenty-three. Sections thirty-six and thirty-seven. Sections forty-two to forty-six. Section fifty-eight. Section sixty-nine, the words "of debt, bill, plaint," from "wherein no" to "imparlance," and the words "his heirs and successors." Schedule.
1 & 2 Geo. 4. c. 54	Clerk of Assize (Ireland) Act 1821	An Act to regulate the Office of Clerk of Assize or Nisi Prius, or Judge's Registrar, in Ireland.	Preamble. Section one, to "of this Act," and the words "his heirs and successors." Section two, to "in Ireland" where those words first occur, from "at the receipt of his" to "and Ireland," from "the first of such" where those words first occur, to "and twenty-two," from "which shall succeed" to "of this Act," where those words "at the receipt of the said Exchequer," and from "the first of such" where those words secondly occur, to the end of the section.
1 & 2 Geo. 4. c. 66	British North America Act 1821	An Act for regulating the Fur Trade and establishing a Criminal and Civil Jurisdiction within certain Parts of North America.	Preamble. Section one, to "passing of this Act." The words "his heirs or successors" and "his heirs and successors" wherever they occur. Section three, to "passing of this Act." Section four. Section six, to "passing of this Act." Repealed as to all Her Majesty's dominions.
1 & 2 Geo. 4. c. 72	Bank of Ireland Act 1821	An Act the title of which begins with the words "An Act to establish" and ends with the words "Three Millions."	Preamble. The words "the said governor and company of" wherever they occur. Section six, to "passing of this Act."
1 & 2 Geo. 4. c. 77	Gaol Fees Abolition (Ireland) Act 1821	An Act the title of which begins with the words "An Act to abolish," and ends with the words "other Officers."	Section one, to "this Act," and the word "that." Section two, to "this Act," and the word "that." Section seven, from "of debt" to "be allowed." Section nine, to "enacted that."
1 & 2 Geo. 4. c. 79	White Herring Fishery (Scotland) Act 1821	An Act the title of which begins with the words "An Act to repeal," and ends with the words "said Fishery."	Section three, to "this Act" where those words first occur, and the word "that" before "all such." Section five, to "passing of this Act."
1 & 2 Geo. 4. c. 112	Stamp Duties in Law Proceedings (Ireland) Act 1821	An Act the title of which begins with the words "An Act to grant" and ends with the words "in Ireland."	Preamble. The words "his heirs and successors" and "his heirs or successors" wherever they occur in sections five, eight, eleven, and fifteen. Section five, from "or other chief" to "like manner" and the word "succeeding."
3 Geo. 4. c. 46	Levy of Fines Act 1822	An Act for the more speedy Return and Levying of Fines, Penalties, and Forfeitures, and Recognizances estreated.	Preamble. Section two, to "and twenty-two," and the words "already are or hereafter." Section eight, the words "lords commissioners of his Majesty's" and "of the United Kingdom of Great Britain and Ireland." Section ten, the words "the said lords commissioners of," "of debt or on the case," and from "wherein" to the end of the section. Section thirteen, the words "his heirs and successors."
3 Geo. 4. c. 49	Sheriffs of Edinburgh and Lanark Act 1822	An Act concerning the Residence of Sheriff's Depute of the Counties of Edinburgh and Lanark.	Preamble. Section one to "this Act" and the word "that" after "every person." Section two.
3 Geo. 4. c. 52	Illicit Distillation (Scotland) Act 1822	An Act the title of which begins with the words "An Act to grant," and ends with the words "and twenty-four."	Preamble. Section one hundred and sixteen, to "enacted that." Section one hundred and seventeen, to "enacted that." Section one hundred and eighteen, to "enacted that." Section one hundred and twenty-one, the words "commissioners of his Majesty's," from "of the United" to "three lords," where those words next occur, and the words "where three or more of them," where those words first occur, the words "said commissioners of his Majesty's," occurring twice.
3 Geo. 4. c. 62	Fees in Office of Lord Register of Scotland Act 1822	An Act the title of which begins with the words "An Act for regulating" and ends with the words "Scotland therein."	The whole act.
3 Geo. 4. c. 63	Crown Lands (Ireland) Act 1822	An Act the title of which begins with the words "An Act to authorize," and ends with the words "in Ireland."	Title, from "the Sale" to "Hereditaments." Preamble. Section twelve, the words "his heirs or successors."
3 Geo. 4. c. 79	Endowed Schools (Ireland) Act 1822	An Act the title of which begins with the words "An Act to amend" and ends with the words "Schools in Ireland."	The words "or other chief governor or governors of Ireland for the time being," and "or other chief governor or governors of Ireland," wherever they occur. Section one, to "of this Act," the words "now and hereafter" and "for the time being" where respectively secondly occurring. Section four, to "this Act." Section six, to "passing of this Act." Section eleven, to "enacted that." Section twelve, to "this Act," and the words "or other chief governor or governors," where lastly occurring, and the words "or they" twice occurring.
3 Geo. 4. c. 114	Hard Labour Act 1822	An Act for the more effectual Punishment of certain Offences by Imprisonment with Hard Labour.	To "passing of this Act."
3 Geo. 4. c. 119	British North America (Trade and Lands) Act 1822	An Act the title of which begins with the words "An Act to regulate," and ends with the words "said Provinces."	The words "his heirs or successors," and "his heirs and successors" wherever they occur. Section thirty-one, to "declared that," and the words "from and after the commencement of this Act." Repealed as to all Her Majesty's dominions.
4 Geo. 4. c. 19	National Debt Reduction Act 1823	An Act for further regulating the Reduction of the National Debt.	Preamble. Section eight, to "passing of this Act," and the word "other." Section eleven, to "said Acts," and the word "succeeding." Section twelve, from "from and after," to "twenty-three" (twice occurring), and from "and the same" to "defraying the same." Section thirteen, from "from and after" to "said provisions; and," from "passed in the thirty-" to "end of another Act," from "and the same" to "defraying the same," and the words "after the said first day of April."
4 Geo. 4. c. 33	County Treasurers (Ireland) Act 1823	An Act the title of which begins with the words "An Act to make," and ends with the words "in Ireland."	Preamble. The words "from and after the passing of this Act," wherever they occur. Section one, to "passing of this Act." Section four, from "at the time" where those words first occur to "this Act," where those words secondly occur, from "at any time" where those words first occur to "twenty-four," from "being such treasurer" to "of this Act" where those words next occur, to "treasurer," and from "one thousand" to "time being." Section six, from "at the time" to "of this Act," where those words next occur. Section thirteen, the words "of debt, bill, plaint," and from "wherein no essoign," to the end of the section.
4 Geo. 4. c. 37	Levy of Fines Act 1823	An Act the title of which begins with the words "An Act to amend" and ends with the words "Recognizances estreated."	Preamble. Section one, to "of the same that," the words "any three or more of" and "commissioners of his Majesty's," from "of the United" to "and Ireland," and the words "said commissioners of his Majesty's." Section five, the words "commissioners of his Majesty's" and "said commissioners of his Majesty's."
4 Geo. 4. c. 40	Linen and Hempen Manufactures (Scotland) Act 1823	An Act to amend several Acts for the Regulation of the Linen and Hempen Manufactures in Scotland.	The whole act.
4 Geo. 4. c. 55	Parliamentary Elections (Ireland) Act 1823	An Act to consolidate and amend the several Acts now in force so far as the same relate to the Election and Return of Members to serve in Parliament for Counties of Cities and Counties of Towns in Ireland.	Preamble. Section twenty-one.
4 Geo. 4. c. 60	Lotteries Act 1823	An Act for granting to His Majesty a Sum of Money to be raised by Lotteries.	Section nineteen, the words "commissioners of his Majesty's." Section thirty-seven, to "enacted that." Section sixty-two, the words "his heirs or successors" and the words "from and after the commencement of this Act."
4 Geo. 4. c. 61	Court of Chancery (Ireland) Act 1823	An Act for the better Administration of Justice in the Court of Chancery in Ireland.	Preamble. Section five, the words "at any time after the commencement of this Act." Section seven, to "passing of this Act," and from "at any time" where those words lastly occur to "Michaelmas term." Section eight, from "on or before" to "be appointed." Section twelve, to "Michaelmas term." Section nineteen, to "enacted that," and the word "that" where it next occurs. Section twenty-four, the words "from and after the commencement of this Act." Sections twenty-five to thirty-two. Sections thirty-five to forty. Section forty-three, to "after the commencement of this Act." Section forty-seven, to "enacted that," and from "that from" to "this Act." Section fifty, to "twenty-three." Section fifty-five, to "this Act" and from "which salaries" to the end of the section. Section fifty-six, the words "from and after the commencement of this Act" (twice occurring) and the words "belonging to or employed in or." Section fifty-eight, to "abolished; and that." Section fifty-nine, to "commencement of this Act," and the words "the governor and company of." Section seventy-two, the words "of debt, bill, plaint," from "in which" to "allowed," and the words "his heirs and successors."
4 Geo. 4. c. 71	Indian Bishops and Courts Act 1823	An Act the title of which begins with the words "An Act for defraying" and ends with the words "at Bombay."	Title, from "for defraying" to "in India." Preamble. Section three, the words "his heirs and successors." Section four, to "enacted that," and the word "that" before "the expence." Section six, to "enacted that," and the word "that" before "a declaration," and before "in every," and before "unless," and "present," and the words "their heirs and successors." Section seven, to "enacted that" and the words "his heirs and successors" twice occurring. Sections twelve and thirteen. Repealed as to all Her Majesty's Dominions.
4 Geo. 4. c. 78	Stamp Duties (Court of Chancery (Ireland)) Act 1823	An Act the title of which begins with the words "An Act to grant" and ends with the words "in Ireland."	The whole act.
4 Geo. 4. c. 79	Additional Places of Worship in the Highlands Act 1823	An Act for building additional Places of Worship in the Highlands and Islands of Scotland.	Preamble. Section three, the words "commissioners of his Majesty's," and from "of the United" to the end of the section.
4 Geo. 4. c. 80	Lascars Act 1823	An Act the title of which begins with the words "An Act to consolidate" and ends with the words "in India."	Preamble. Section thirty-one, to "enacted that." Repealed as to all Her Majesty's dominions.
4 Geo. 4. c. 97	Commissary Courts (Scotland) Act 1823	An Act for the Regulation of the Court of the Commissaries of Edinburgh; and for altering and amending the Jurisdiction of Inferior Commissaries in Scotland.	The whole Act, except sections five and thirteen. Section thirteen, the words "or stewartries," from "after the said" to "twenty-four," and from "or stewartry" thrice occurring.
5 Geo. 4. c. 64	Fisheries Act 1824	An Act to amend the several Acts for the Encouragement and Improvement of the British and Irish Fisheries.	Section nine, the words "or other chief governor or governors of Ireland" and the words "from and after the passing of this Act." Section ten, the words "lord high treasurer or commissioners of His Majesty's" from "of the United" to "three of them," the words "the said lord high treasurer or commissioners of" wherever they occur, and the words "the lord high treasurer or commissioners of" where they last occur.
5 Geo. 4. c. 67	Newfoundland Act 1824	An Act for the better Administration of Justice in Newfoundland, and for other Purposes.	Preamble. Section one, to "of the same that." The words "his heirs and successors" wherever they occur in sections two, seventeen, and thirty-five, and the words "or their" in the two last-mentioned sections. Section twenty-one, from "from and" to "this Act" where those words next occur. Repealed as to all Her Majesty's dominions.
5 Geo. 4. c. 74	Weights and Measures Act 1824	An Act for ascertaining and establishing Uniformity of Weights and Measures.	Section twenty-five, the words "his heirs and successors" occurring twice, and the word "and that."
5 Geo. 4. c. 78	Duchy of Cornwall Act 1824	An Act the title of which begins with the words "An Act to amend" and ends with the words "in Exmouth."	Title from "and to authorize" to the end of the title.
5 Geo. 4. c. 82	Clerk of the Parliaments Act 1824	An Act for better regulating the Office of Clerk of the Parliaments.	Section two, the words "his heirs and successors."
5 Geo. 4. c. 83	Vagrancy Act 1824	An Act for the Punishment of idle and disorderly Persons, and Rogues and Vagabonds, in that part of Great Britain called England.	Preamble. Section nine, the words "his heirs and successors."
5 Geo. 4. c. 84	Transportation Act 1824	An Act for the Transportation of Offenders from Great Britain.	Preamble. Sections eighteen and nineteen.
5 Geo. 4. c. 90	Church of Scotland Act 1824	An Act to amend an Act for building additional Places of Worship in the Highlands and Islands of Scotland.	Preamble. Section one. Section two, the words "commissioners of His Majesty's" and "of the United Kingdom of Great Britain and Ireland." Section fourteen, the words "his heirs and successors." Section thirty, the words "the said commissioners of," wherever they occur, and the words "or any three or more of them for the time being."
5 Geo. 4. c. 102	Dublin Justices Act 1824	An Act the title of which begins with the words "An Act to amend" and ends with the words "Dublin Metropolis."	Preamble. Section seven, the words "his heirs and successors." Section nine, to "passing of this Act." Section thirteen, to "passing of this Act." Section fourteen, to "passing of this Act." Section twenty-two, to "passing of this Act." Section twenty-seven, from "or other" to "time being" next occurring.
5 Geo. 4. c. 111	Crown Debts Act 1824	An Act the title of which begins with the words "An Act to amend" and ends with the words "within the same."	Title, the words "His heirs and Successors." Preamble. Section one, to "passing of this Act that," and the word "that" before "all such enactments."
5 Geo. 4. c. 113	Slave Trade Act 1824	An Act to amend and consolidate the Laws relating to the Abolition of the Slave Trade.	Preamble. Section two, the words "except in such special cases as are herein-after mentioned." Section three, to "permitted" and the words "his heirs and successors." Section four, to "permitted." Section five, to "permitted." Section six, to "permitted." Section seven, to "permitted." Section eight, to "permitted" and the words "his heirs and successors." Section nine, the words "except in such cases as are in and by this Act permitted" occurring twice. Section ten, to "provided for," and the words "otherwise than as aforesaid," occurring twice, and the words "his heirs or successors." Section eleven, to "permitted."
6 Geo. 4. c. 17	Crown Lands Act 1825	An Act the title of which begins with the words "An Act to extend" and ends with the words "and Successors."	Title, the words "his Heirs and Successors." Preamble. Section one, to "of the same that," the words "his heirs or successors" wherever they occur, the words "his heirs and successors," the words "or their" where they first occur, and the word "respectively" where it last occurs. Section three, the words "his heirs or successors" occurring twice.
6 Geo. 4. c. 22	Jurors (Scotland) Act 1825	An Act the title of which begins with the words "An Act to regulate" and ends with the words "in Scotland."	Preamble. Section one, to "of the same that," and the words "or stewarts." Section two, the words "and stewarts" and "or stewartries." Section three, from "and the stewart" to "Scotland," the words "or stewartry respectively" and "or stewart," and the words "or stewartry" where they last occur. Section four, the words "and stewart," "and stewartry in Scotland" "or stewart," and "or stewartry." Section eight, the words "or stewarts of the stewartries" and "or stewart." Section ten, the words "and stewarts" and "or stewarts." Section eleven, the words "or stewart" wherever they occur, and the words "or stewartry in Scotland." Section twelve, the words "or stewart." Section thirteen, the words "and stewarts." Section seventeen, the words "and stewarts." Section twenty-one to "enacted that" and the words "it is hereby provided and declared that"
6 Geo. 4. c. 23	Sheriff Courts (Scotland) Act 1825	An Act for the better Regulation of the Sheriff and Stewart and Burgh Courts of Scotland.	Preamble. Section one, the words "and stewarts" and "or stewarts." Section two, the words "and stewart," and the words "or stewart" occurring twice. Section three, the words "or stewart." Section four, the words "or stewart" and "and stewart." Section six, the words "or stewart." Section seven, the words "and stewart" occurring twice. Section eight, the words "or stewart" and "and stewartry." Section ten, the words "and stewarts" and the words "or stewart" occurring twice, and the words "or stewartry."
6 Geo. 4. c. 30	Court of Chancery (Ireland) Officers Act 1825	An Act the title of which begins with the words "An Act to amend" and ends with the words "in Ireland."	Preamble. Section one, to "passing of this Act" and from "provided always" to the end of the section. Section sixteen, to "enacted that" and the word "that" wherever it occurs. Section eighteen.
6 Geo. 4. c. 42	Bankers (Ireland) Act 1825	An Act for the better Regulation of Copartnerships of certain Bankers in Ireland.	Preamble. Section two, to "passing of this Act." Section six, the words "after the passing of this Act." Section ten, the words "from and after the passing of this Act." Section fifteen, the words "his heirs and successors" where they secondly occur. Section seventeen, the words "after the passing of this Act." Section twenty-four, the words "of debt bill plaint," and from "in which such action" to "allowed," and the words "his heirs and successors."
6 Geo. 4. c. 48	Justices of the Peace Small Debt (Scotland) Act 1825	An Act the title of which begins with the words "An Act to alter" and ends with the words "in Scotland."	Preamble. Section twenty-seven, the words "from and after the passing of this Act."
6 Geo. 4. c. 50	Juries Act 1825	An Act for consolidating and amending the Laws relative to Jurors and Juries.	Preamble. Section nine, to "of the same that," and from "nisi" to "delivery." Section twenty-six, the words "or nisi prius." Section thirty-seven, the words "or nisi prius." Section forty, from "or nisi" to "delivery." Section forty-two, from "nisi" where it secondly occurs to "delivery." Section forty-three, from "nisi" to "delivery." Section forty-six, from "nisi" to "delivery," and the words "of debt bill plaint" and "his heirs or successors." Section fifty-five, from "nisi" to "delivery."
6 Geo. 4. c. 62	Poor Prisoners (Scotland) Act 1825	An Act to amend an Act of the Scotch Parliament relative to the Aliment of poor Prisoners.	Preamble. Section one, to "of this Act."
6 Geo. 4. c. 78	Quarantine Act 1825	An Act the title of which begins with the words "An Act to repeal" and ends with the words "lieu thereof."	Preamble. Section two, the words "his heirs or successors," "his heirs and successors," and "or their," wherever they respectively occur. Section three, the words "his heirs and successors," and the words "or their" occurring twice. Section four, the words "or other chief governor or governors of Ireland" wherever they occur, the words "or them," and the words "or other chief governor or governors" where they last occur. Section five, the words "his heirs or successors" occurring twice. Section six, the words "his heirs or successors" occurring twice, and the words "or their." Section seven, the words "his heirs or successors" and the words "or their." Section twenty, the words "his heirs or successors" and the words "or their." Section twenty-four, the words "his heirs and successors." Section twenty-five, the words "his heirs or successors." Section twenty-seven, the words "his heirs or successors" wherever they occur, the words "or their," and the words "his heirs and successors." Section twenty-eight, the words "his heirs and successors." Section thirty-two, from "in which" to "granted," and the words "his heirs and successors." Section thirty-three, the words "his heirs or successors." Section thirty-four, the words "his heirs or successors." Section thirty-six, the words "his heirs or successors."
6 Geo. 4. c. 84	Judges' Pensions Act 1825	An Act the title of which begins with the words "An Act to provide" and ends with the words "respective Offices."	Section four, the words "his heirs and successors."
6 Geo. 4. c. 85	Indian Salaries and Pensions Act 1825	An Act the title of which begins with the words "An Act for further" and ends with the words "of Coromandel."	Title except to the word "Calcutta." The whole Act except sections four, five, and fifteen. Section four, from "and that the payment" to the end of the section. Section fifteen, the words "his heirs and successors." Repealed as to all Her Majesty's dominions.
6 Geo. 4. c. 87	Consular Advances Act 1825	An Act the title of which begins with the words "An Act to regulate" and ends with the words "Public Purposes."	Preamble. Section one, to "of the same that." Section five, the words "his heirs and successors." Section ten, from "lord high" to "Majesty's," and from "of the United" where those words next occur to "being." Section eleven, from "lord high" to "Majesty's," and the words "for the time being." Section nineteen, from "lord high" where that word next occurs, and from "of the United" to "time being." Section twenty-one, the words "of debt bill plaint."
6 Geo. 4. c. 120	Court of Session Act 1825	An Act for the better regulating of the Forms of Process in the Courts of Law in Scotland.	Preamble. Section one, to "to come." Section fifty-seven, from "and . . the High" to the end of the section.
7 Geo. 4. c. 8	Juries (Scotland) Act 1826	An Act the title of which begins with the words "An Act to amend" and ends with the words "Special Jurors."	Preamble. Section one, to "passing of this Act," and the words "or stewartry" occurring twice.
7 Geo. 4. c. 9	Hard Labour (Ireland) Act 1826	An Act to provide for the more effectual Punishment of certain Offences in Ireland by Imprisonment with Hard Labour.	To "passing of this Act," where those words first occur, and the words "that from and after the passing of this Act."
7 Geo. 4. c. 14	Lunacy (Ireland) Act 1826	An Act the title of which begins with the words "An Act for further" and ends with the words "in Ireland."	Preamble. Section one, to "passing of this Act," the words "or other chief governor or governors of Ireland," and the words "or them." Section three, the words "or other chief governor or governors of Ireland."
7 Geo. 4. c. 16	Chelsea and Kilmainham Hospitals Act 1826	An Act to consolidate and amend several Acts relating to the Royal Hospitals for Soldiers at Chelsea and Kilmainham.	Preamble. Section thirty-one, from "of the lord" to "commissioners of." Section thirty-three, the words "of debt bill plaint," and from "in which said suit" to "imparlance," and the words "his heirs and successors." Section forty-two, the words "his heirs and successors." Section forty-three, the words "his heirs and successors."
7 Geo. 4. c. 21	Mandamus (Ireland) Act 1826	An Act for the better regulating Proceedings on Writs of Mandamus in Ireland.	Preamble. Section one, to "of this Act."
7 Geo. 4. c. 32	Board of Trade (President) Act 1826	An Act to amend an Act for suppressing or regulating certain Offices therein mentioned so far as relates to the Board of Trade.	To "of the same that," from "lord high" to "Majesty's," and from "of the United" to "time being" where these words next occur.
7 Geo. 4. c. 46	Country Bankers Act 1826	An Act the title of which begins with the words "An Act for the better," and ends with the words "to the same."	Preamble, from "And whereas it was." Section one, to "of this Act." Section fifteen, the words "of the said governor and company" where they last occur. Section sixteen, the words "his heirs and successors."
7 Geo. 4. c. 61	Justices (Ireland) Act 1826	An Act for the more effectual Administration of Justice in Cities, Towns Corporate, and other local Jurisdictions in Ireland.	Preamble. Section one, to "of the same that," and the words "lords justices or other chief governor or governors" wherever they occur.
7 Geo. 4. c. 63	County Buildings Act 1826	An Act the title of which begins with the words "An Act to provide" and ends with the words "and Wales."	Preamble. Section three, the words "at any time after the passing of this Act." Section four, from "and to direct" to "Act contained." Section eight, from "nisi" where it first occurs to "delivery," where it next occurs, and from "nisi" where it secondly occurs to "delivery." Sections ten to twelve. Sections sixteen to eighteen. Schedule A.
7 Geo. 4. c. 64	Criminal Law Act 1826	An Act for improving the Administration of Criminal Justice in England.	Preamble. Section one, to "of the same that." Section twenty-nine, the words "commissioners of His Majesty's."
7 Geo. 4. c. 66	Clergy Residence Act 1826	An Act the title of which begins with the words "An Act to render" and ends with the words "their Benefices."	Preamble. Section one, to "passing of this Act."
7 & 8 Geo. 4. c. 17	Distress (Costs) Act 1827	An Act the title of which begins with the words "An Act to authorise" and ends with the word "Distresses."	The words "from and after the passing of this Act."
7 & 8 Geo. 4. c. 53	Excise Management Act 1827	An Act the title of which begins with the words "An Act to consolidate" and ends with the words "and Ireland."	Preamble. Section one, to "of the same that" and the words "his heirs and successors," and the word "that" before "each of such." Section two, the words "his heirs and successors" occurring twice; the words "the lord high treasurer and commissioners of" and from "the lord high" where those words last occur, to "commissioners of." Section four, the words "the lord high treasurer or any three or more of the commissioners of" and the words "such lord high treasurer or commissioners of" occurring twice. Section six, from "the lord high" to "commissioners of," where those words next occur. Section fourteen, from "the lord high" to "commissioners of." Section sixteen, the words "the lord high treasurer or any three or more of the commissioners of" occurring twice. Section forty-six, the words "the lord high treasurer or the commissioners of" and from "the lord high" to "commissioners of." Section fifty-four, the words "the governor and company of" occurring twice. Section fifty-five, the words "the governor and company of." Section fifty-eight, the words "his heirs or successors." Section fifty-nine, the words "his heirs or successors" wherever they occur. Section seventy-two, from "the lord high" to "commissioners of" where those words next occur. Section ninety-six, the words "his heirs and successors." Section ninety-nine, the words "the lord high treasurer or any three or more of the commissioners of" occurring twice, from "for that purpose" to "or hands," and the words "his or." Section one hundred and one, from "lord high" to "commissioners of the." Section one hundred and three, the words "his heirs and successors." Section one hundred and five, from "the lord high" to "commissioners of." Section one hundred and six, the words "the commissioners of," where they secondly occur and the words "or any three of them." Section one hundred and twelve, from "the lord high" to "commissioners of," and the words "his heirs and successors" and from "or other revenues" to the end of the section. Section one hundred and twenty-two, from "the lord high" to "treasurer of," where those words next occur, and the words "his heirs and successors" occurring twice. Section one hundred and twenty-three, the words "his heirs and successors." Section one hundred and twenty-five, the words "his heirs and successors." Section one hundred and twenty-six, the words "his heirs and successors."
7 & 8 Geo. 4. c. 55	Board of Stamps in Great Britain and Ireland Act 1827	An Act to consolidate the Boards of Stamps in Great Britain and Ireland.	Preamble. Section one, to "of the same that" and the word "that" before "the said duties." Section five, the words "the lord high treasurer or the commissioners of," from "of the United" to "three of them" and the words "the said lord high treasurer or the commissioners of." Section nine, the words "his heirs or successors." Section ten, the words "the said lord high treasurer or of the commissioners of."
7 & 8 Geo. 4. c. 65	Admiralty Act 1827	An Act to explain and remove Doubts touching the Admiralty.	Section four, the words "from and after the passing of this Act."
7 & 8 Geo. 4. c. 71	Imprisonment for Debt Act 1827	An Act to regulate Proceedings upon Process where the Debt or Cause of Action is under Twenty Pounds, and to regulate the Practice of Arrests.	Preamble. Section six, the words "from and after the said first day of August."
7 & 8 Geo. 4. c. 72	Church Building Act 1827	An Act to amend the Acts for building and promoting the building of additional Churches in populous Parishes.	Preamble.
9 Geo. 4. c. 14	Statute of Frauds Amendment Act 1828	An Act for rendering a written Memorandum necessary to the Validity of certain Promises and Engagements.	Preamble. Section one, to "of the same that" and the word "that" before "where there shall." Section two.
9 Geo. 4. c. 15	Amendment of Record in Civil Actions Act 1828	An Act to prevent a failure of Justice by reason of Variances between Records and Writings produced in Evidence in support thereof.	The whole act.
9 Geo. 4. c. 16	Life Annuities Act 1828	An Act to repeal so much of several Acts as empowers the Commissioners for the Reduction of the National Debt to grant Life Annuities.	The whole act.
9 Geo. 4. c. 23	Bank Notes Act 1828	An Act the title of which begins with the words "An Act to enable" and ends with the words "thereon."	Section one, from "from and after" to "twenty-eight." Section seven, the words "his heirs and successors." Section fourteen, the words "his heirs and successors" and the words "of debt bill plaint." Section fifteen, the words "the governor and company of."
9 Geo. 4. c. 24	Bills of Exchange (Ireland) Act 1828	An Act to consolidate and amend the Laws relating to Bills of Exchange and Promissory Notes in Ireland.	Preamble. Section thirteen, from "from and after" to "twenty-eight."
9 Geo. 4. c. 25	Revenue Solicitors' Act 1828	An Act the title of which begins with the words "An Act to authorize" and ends with the words "Revenue Matters."	Preamble. Section one, to "of the same that."
9 Geo. 4. c. 26	Keeper of Register of Hornings, etc. (Scotland) Act 1828	An Act to regulate the Office of Keeper of the General Register of Hornings and Inhibitions in Scotland.	The whole act.
9 Geo. 4. c. 29	Circuit Courts (Scotland) Act 1828	An Act to authorise additional Circuit Courts of Justiciary to be held, and to facilitate Criminal Trials, in Scotland.	Section one, from "from and after" to "Act" where it first occurs. Section three, the words "his heirs and successors" and the words "or their." Section four, the words "his heirs and successors" and "his heirs or successors" and the words "or their" occurring twice. Section seven, the words "it is hereby provided that" and from "shall be in the form" to "which execution." Sections eight and nine. Section eleven. Section fourteen, the words "after an interlocutor of relevancy shall have been pronounced." Section twenty-two, to "hereby provided, that." Schedule B.
9 Geo. 4. c. 38	Land Tax Commissioners' Act 1828	An Act the title of which begins with the words "An Act for rectifying" and ends with the words "therein recited."	Preamble. Section one, to "of the same that." Section five, the words "from and after the passing of this Act."
9 Geo. 4. c. 39	Salmon Fisheries (Scotland) Act 1828	An Act for the Preservation of the Salmon Fisheries in Scotland.	Preamble. Section one, to "repealed and that." Section seven, the words "from and after the passing of this Act." Section twelve, the word "also."
9 Geo. 4. c. 43	Division of Counties Act 1828	An Act for the better Regulation of Divisions in the several Counties of England and Wales.	Preamble. Section one, to "of the same that" and from "after the Michaelmas" to "this Act," and the word "that" before "every such statement."
9 Geo. 4. c. 47	Passage Vessel Licences Act 1828	An Act the title of which begins with the words "An Act for regulating" and ends with the words "United Kingdom."	Section one, to "twenty-eight," and the word "that" before "such license" and before "every such license."
9 Geo. 4. c. 61	Alehouse Act 1828	An Act to regulate the granting of Licences to Keepers of Inns, Alehouses, and Victualling Houses in England.	Preamble. Section one, to "of the same that" and the word "that" before "such meeting" and before "it shall." Section four, from "at the general or" to "Act and" and the word "subsequent."
9 Geo. 4. c. 65	Bank Notes (No. 2) Act 1828	An Act the title of which begins with the words "An Act to restrain" and ends with the words "or Ireland."	Preamble. Section one, to "of the same that" and from "twenty" to "twenty-nine." Section three, from "lord high" to "Majesty's," the words "or any three or more of them," and from "such lord" to "of."
9 Geo. 4. c. 66	Nautical Almanack Act 1828	An Act for repealing the Laws now in force relating to the Discovery of the Longitude at Sea.	Preamble. Section two, the words "of debt, bill, plaint."
9 Geo. 4. c. 74	Criminal Law (India) Act 1828	An Act for improving the Administration of Criminal Justice in the East Indies.	The whole Act, except sections one, seven to nine, twenty-five, twenty-six, fifty-six, and one hundred and ten. Repealed as to all Her Majesty's dominions, except so far as in force in the Straits Settlements.
9 Geo. 4. c. 80	Bankers' Composition (Ireland) Act 1828	An Act the title of which begins with the words "An Act to enable" and ends with the words "Duties thereon."	Preamble. Section one, to "twenty-eight." Section seven, the words "his heirs and successors." Section thirteen, the words "his heirs and successors" and the words "of debt, bill, plaint." Section fourteen, the words "of the governor and company."
9 Geo. 4. c. 81	Bank Notes (Ireland) Act 1828	An Act the title of which begins with the words "An Act for making" and ends with the words "are issued."	To "twenty-nine" and the words "of debt, bill, plaint."
9 Geo. 4. c. 82	Lighting of Towns (Ireland) Act 1828	An Act to make provision for the lighting, cleansing, and watching of Cities, Towns Corporate, and Market Towns in Ireland in certain cases.	Preamble. Section two, to "Act" where it first occurs, and the words "or other chief governor or governors of Ireland" and the words "of the lord lieutenant or other chief governor or governors." Section twelve, the words "or other chief governor or governors." Section eighteen, the words "of debt bill plaint" and from "wherein respectively" to "allowed." Section sixty-nine from "of debt" to "plaint," and from "in which" to the end of the section.
9 Geo. 4. c. 83	Australian Courts Act 1828	An Act the title of which begins with the words "An Act to provide" and ends with the words "relating thereto."	Section one, to "of the same that," and the word "that" before "each of them," and the words "his heirs and successors" wherever they occur. Section seven, the words "his heirs and successors" occurring twice, and the words "or their." Section ten, the words "his heirs and successors," "or them," and "or their." Section sixteen, the words "his heirs and successors" occurring twice. Repealed as to all Her Majesty's dominions.
9 Geo. 4. c. 92	Savings Bank Act 1828	An Act to consolidate and amend the Laws relating to Savings Banks.	Section fifty-one, the words "lords commissioners of his Majesty's" where they first occur, from "said lords" to "Majesty's," the words "or any three or more of them," the words "under their hands," and the words "the said governor and company of." Section fifty-five, from "lord high" to "Majesty's" where those words respectively first occur, from "of the United" to "Ireland" where it next occurs, the words "lord high treasurer or commissioners of the said," the words "or any three of them," and the words "under their hands." Section fifty-six, the words "the governor and company of" and "the said governor and company of." Section fifty-seven, the words "the governor and company of" wherever they occur. Section fifty-eight, the words "the governor and company of" and the words "the said governor and company of" wherever they occur. Section sixty, the words "the governor and company of." Section sixty-one, from "lord high" to "Majesty's," and from "of the United" to "time being."
9 Geo. 4. c. 94	Clergy Resignation Bonds Act 1828	An Act the title of which begins with the words "An Act for rendering," and ends with the words "specified Cases."	Preamble. Section one, to "of the same that" and the words "after the passing of this Act." Section three, the words "his heirs or successors." Section six, the words "his heirs or successors."
10 Geo. 4. c. 7	Roman Catholic Relief Act 1829	An Act for the Relief of His Majesty's Roman Catholic Subjects.	Section seventeen, the words "his heirs or successors." Section eighteen, the words "his heirs or successors" and from "or lord" to "governors." Section twenty-four, the words "after the commencement of this Act." Section twenty-six, the words "after the commencement of this Act." Section twenty-seven. Section twenty-eight, the words "or other chief governor or governors of Ireland."
10 Geo. 4. c. 13	Court Funds Act 1829	An Act to provide for Monies paid into Court under Acts afterwards repealed.	To "of the same that," and the words "or Court of Exchequer as the case may be" occurring twice.
10 Geo. 4. c. 24	Government Annuities Act 1829	An Act to enable the Commissioners for the Reduction of the National Debt to grant Life Annuities and Annuities for Terms of Years.	Preamble. Section one, to "of this Act." Section three, from "lords" to "Majesty's," and the words "or any three or more of them." Section nine, the words "of the governor and company." Section ten, the words "governor and company of the" occurring twice. Section fourteen, the words "commissioners of his Majesty's," and the words "or any three or more of them" wherever they occur, and the words "the said commissioners of" wherever they occur. Section fifteen, the words "commissioners of His Majesty's," and the words "or any three or more of them." Section twenty-one, the words "commissioners of his Majesty's," "the said commissioners of," "or any three or more of them," "under their hands," and "the said governor and company of." Section twenty-six, the words "the said governor and company of." Section twenty-seven, the words "the governor and company of." Section thirty, the words "the said governor and company of." Section thirty-one, the words "the governor and company of." Section thirty-three, the words "the governor and company of." Section thirty-eight, the words "the said governor and company of." Section forty-four, the words "the said governor and company of." Section forty, the words "his heirs and successors." Section forty-one, the words, "the governor and company of" and the words "his heirs and successors." Section forty-two, the words "his heirs and successors." Section forty-seven, the words "commissioners of his Majesty's." Section forty-eight, from "lord high" where those words first occur to "Majesty's" and from "said lord" to "commissioners of the" and the words "or any three or more of them" occurring twice, "for the time being" and "of the governor and company."
10 Geo. 4. c. 41	Butter Trade (Ireland) Act 1829	An Act to amend the Laws for the Regulation of the Butter Trade in Ireland.	Preamble. Section one, to "of the same that." Section three, from "commissioners" to "Majesty's" where it next occurs, and the words "or any three of them." Section five, the words "commissioners of his Majesty's" and "the said commissioners of." Section six, the words "commissioners of."
10 Geo. 4. c. 44	Metropolitan Police Act 1829	An Act for improving the Police in and near the Metropolis.	Section ten, from "commissioners" to "Majesty's" and from "of the United" to "Ireland."
10 Geo. 4. c. 50	Crown Lands Act 1829	An Act the title of which begins with the words "An Act to consolidate," and ends with the words "and Alderney."	Section eight, to "Act" where it first occurs, and the words "his heirs or successors" "present" "his Majesty's" "forests and land revenues" "his heirs or successors" and "or their." Section eleven, the words "his Majesty's," "forests and land revenues" and "his heirs or successors," and from "on the fifth" to the end of the section. Section twelve, the words "his Majesty's" where they first occur, and the words "forests and land revenues" and from "lord high" to "his Majesty's" and the words "for the time being" occurring twice. Section thirteen, the words "his Majesty's" and "forests and land revenues" respectively occurring twice. Section fourteen, the words "his Majesty's" where they first occur, the words "forests and land revenues" and "his heirs and successors," from "lord high" to "Majesty's," the words "for the time being" occurring twice, and the words "his heirs or successors." Section sixteen, the words "his Majesty's" where they first occur, and the words "forests and land revenues" and from "and when" to the end of the section. Section seventeen, the words "his Majesty's" and "forests and land revenues." Section twenty-two, the words "for the time being" "his Majesty's" and "forests and land revenues." Section twenty-three, the words "for the time being" "his Majesty's" "forests and land revenues" and "his heirs or successors." Section twenty-four, the words "his heirs or successors." Section twenty-seven, the words "his heirs and successors" "for the time being," "his Majesty's" and "forests and land revenues." In sections twenty-nine, thirty, thirty-one, thirty-two, thirty-three, and thirty-four, the words "for the time being," "his Majesty's," and "forests and land revenues." Section thirty-five, the words "his heirs or successors" and the following words wherever they occur: "for the time being," "his Majesty's," and "forests and land revenues." Section thirty-nine, the words "for the time being," "his Majesty's," and "forests and land revenues." Section forty, the words "his Majesty's" and "forests and land revenues." Section forty-two, the following words wherever they occur: "for the time being," "his Majesty's," "forests and land revenues," "his heirs and successors," and "his heirs or successors." Section forty-three, the words "for the time being," "his Majesty's," and "forests and land revenues." Section forty-four, the words "for the time being," "his Majesty's," and "forests and land revenues," and the words "his heirs and successors" occurring twice. Section forty-five, the words "his heirs and successors" and "his heirs or successors" wherever they respectively occur, and from "lord high" to "Majesty's," the words "for the time being," and the words "under his or their hand or hands" where they first occur. Section forty-six, the words "for the time being," "his Majesty's," and "forests and land revenues." Section forty-seven, the words "for the time being," "his Majesty's," "forests and land revenues," and "his heirs or successors." Section forty-eight, the words "for the time being," "his Majesty's," and "forests and land revenues." Section forty-nine, the words "his heirs or successors" occurring twice, the words "his heirs and successors," and the following words occurring twice: "for the time being," "his Majesty's," and "forests and land revenues." Section fifty, the words "for the time being," "his Majesty's," and "forests and land revenues," and the words "his heirs or successors" occurring twice. Section fifty-one, the words "his heirs and successors," and the following words occurring twice: "his Majesty's," "for the time being," and "forests and land revenues." Section fifty-two, the words "his heirs or successors" and "his heirs and successors" wherever they respectively occur, and the following words occurring twice: "for the time being," "his Majesty's," and "forests and land revenues." Section fifty-three, the words "for the time being" where they respectively occur, and the words "his Majesty's" and "forests and land revenues" respectively occurring twice. In sections fifty-four, fifty-five, fifty-seven, and fifty-eight, the words "for the time being," "his Majesty's," and "forests and land revenues," wherever they respectively occur. Section sixty, the words "his Majesty's" where they first occur, the words "forests and land revenues," "lord high treasurer or commissioners of his Majesty's," and "under his or their hand or hands," and from "said lord" to "Majesty's" and the words "for the time being" occurring twice. In sections sixty-one, sixty-two, and sixty-nine, the following words wherever they occur: "for the time being," "his Majesty's," and "forests and land revenues." Section seventy, the words "his heirs or successors" occurring twice, and the words "for the time being," "his Majesty's," and "forests and land revenues." Section seventy-two, the words "his heirs or successors" occurring twice, the words "for the time being," the words, "his Majesty's" where they first occur, and the words "forests and land revenues." Section seventy-five, the words "for the time being," the words "his Majesty's" where they first occur, the words "forests and land revenues," and from "lord high" to "Majesty's," the words "in their discretion," and the words "his heirs or successors." Section seventy-six, to "abolished; and that," and the words "his Majesty's" and "forests and land revenues." Section seventy-seven, the words "for the time being," and the words "his Majesty's" and "forests and land revenues" wherever they respectively occur. Section seventy-eight, the words "his Majesty's" and "forests and land revenues." Section eighty, the words "for the time being," "his Majesty's," and "forests and land revenues." Section eighty-one, the words "his Majesty's," and "forests and land revenues" where they respectively secondly and thirdly occur, and the words "for the time being" occurring twice. Section eighty-two, the words "for the time being," "his Majesty's," and "forests and land revenues." Section eighty-four, the words "his Majesty's," and "forests and land revenues" respectively occurring twice, and the words "for the time being" wherever they occur. Section eighty-five, the words "for the time being" occurring twice, the words "his Majesty's," the words "forests and land revenues" occurring twice, and the words "his heirs or successors." Section eighty-six to "enacted, that." Section eighty-nine, the words "for the time being," the words "his Majesty's" where they last occur, and the words "forests and land revenues." Section ninety, the words "for the time being," "his Majesty's," and "forests and land revenues." Section ninety-two, the words "his heirs or successors," "for the time being," "his Majesty's," and "forests and land revenues" wherever they respectively occur. Section ninety-three, the words "for the time being," and "his Majesty's," where they respectively first and thirdly occur, and the words "forests and land revenues" occurring twice, and from "said lord" to "Majesty's" where it next occurs, the words "his heirs and successors," and "his heirs and successors." Section ninety-four, from "said lord" to "Majesty's" where it next occurs, the words "his heirs and successors," the words "his Majesty's" wherever they occur before the word "woods," and the following words wherever they occur: "for the time being," and "forests and land revenues." Section ninety-five, the words "his Majesty's" where they secondly occur, the words "forests and land revenues," and the words "for the time being" occurring twice. Section ninety-six, the words "his heirs and successors," and the following words respectively occurring twice: "for the time being," "his Majesty's," and "forests and land revenues." Section ninety-seven, the following words respectively occurring twice: "for the time being," "his Majesty's," and "forests and land revenues." Section ninety-eight, the words "his Majesty's" where they first occur, and the words "for the time being," "forests and land revenues," and "his heirs or successors." Section ninety-nine, the words "his Majesty's" and "forests and land revenues." Section one hundred, the words "from and after the passing of this Act," the words "his Majesty's" where they first occur, and the words "forests and land revenues." Section one hundred and six, the words "his Majesty's" where they occur, and the words "forests and land revenues for the time being." In sections one hundred and seven and one hundred and eight, the words "his Majesty's," and "forests and land revenues." Section one hundred and nine, the words "for the time being," the words "his Majesty's" where they first and thirdly occur, the words "forests and land revenues" occurring twice, the words "lord high treasurer or of the commissioners of his Majesty's," the words "the governor and company of," and from "said lord" to "Majesty's." Section one hundred and ten, the words "the governor and company of," "his Majesty's," and "forests and land revenues." Section one hundred and eleven, from "lord high" to "Majesty's" where it next occurs, and the words "for the time being," "his Majesty's," and "forests and land revenues." Section one hundred and twelve, from "said lord" to "Majesty's," the words "him or and from "under the hand" to "time being and," and the words "the said governor and company of." Section one hundred and seventeen, the words "for the time being," "his Majesty's," and "forests and land revenues." Section one hundred and eighteen, the words "for the time being," "his Majesty's," and "forests and land revenues" wherever they respectively occur. Section one hundred and nineteen, the words "his Majesty's" and "forests and land revenues" respectively occurring twice. Section one hundred and twenty, the words "his Majesty's," and "forests and land revenues." Section one hundred and twenty-two, to "company of," and the words "his Majesty's" and "forests and land revenues" respectively occurring twice. Section one hundred and twenty-three, the words "his Majesty's" and "forests and land revenues," wherever they respectively occur, and the words "the governor and company of" and "for the time being." Section one hundred and twenty-four, the words "for the time being" and "his Majesty's" where they respectively secondly occur, and the words "forests and land revenues," "the governor and company of," and "the said governor and company of." Section one hundred and twenty-five, the words "for the time being," "his Majesty's," and "forests and land revenues," and from "within thirty" where those words first occur to "and also" where those words first occur, and the word "following." Section one hundred and twenty-six, from "or of an Act passed in the forty-seventh" to "amend the said last-mentioned Act." Section one hundred and twenty-seven, the words "his heirs and successors" and "his heirs or successors." Section one hundred and twenty-nine, from "or any" where those words secondly occur to "therefore." Section one hundred and thirty, the words "his heirs and successors." Section one hundred and thirty-four, the words "his heirs or successors." Section one hundred and thirty-five, the words "his heirs or successors."
10 Geo. 4. c. 53	Ecclesiastical Courts Act 1829	An Act the title of which begins with the words "An Act to regulate" and ends with the words "in England."	Preamble. Section one, to "of the same that." Section ten, the words "from and after the passing of this Act." Section eleven, the words "from and after the passing of this Act." Section twelve, the words "after the passing of this Act."
10 Geo. 4. c. 62	Disqualification for House of Commons (India) Act 1829	An Act to exclude Persons accepting Offices in the East Indies from being Members of the House of Commons.	The whole act.
11 Geo. 4. & 1 Will. 4. c. 22	Richmond Lunatic Asylum Act 1830	An Act the title of which begins with the words "An Act for appropriating" and ends with the words "Lunatic Asylum."	Preamble. Section two, to "Act" where it first occurs. Section five, to "Act" where it first occurs.
11 Geo. 4. & 1 Will. 4. c. 26	National Debt Act 1830	An Act the title of which begins with the words "An Act to authorize" and ends with the word "Annuities."	Preamble.
11 Geo. 4. & 1 Will. 4. c. 36	Contempt of Court Act 1830	An Act for altering and amending the Law regarding Commitments by Courts of Equity for Contempts, and the taking Bills pro Confesso.	Preamble. Section fifteen, rule seven, from "on the thirtieth" to "following day," and the words "to be named in the Court," and rule eight.
11 Geo. 4. & 1 Will. 4. c. 41	Army Pensions Act 1830	An Act to make further Regulations with respect to Army Pensions.	Preamble. Section five, from "with respect" where those words first occur to "pay" where it first occurs, and from "with respect" where those words secondly occur to "pay" where it next occurs, and the words "or pay" occurring twice.
11 Geo. 4. & 1 Will. 4. c. 43	Demise of the Crown Act 1830	An Act the title of which begins with the words "An Act to abolish" and ends with the words "the Crown."	Preamble. Section one, to "of the same that" and the words "of his late Majesty, or" and "has possessed or enjoyed or." Section two, the words "commissioners of his Majesty's" and "for the time being." Section three.
11 Geo. 4. & 1 Will. 4. c. 51	Beer Licences Act 1830	An Act the title of which begins with the words "An Act to repeal" and ends with the words "relation thereto."	Preamble. Section twenty-three, from "from and after" to "thirty."
11 Geo. 4. & 1 Will. 4. c. 56	Endowed Schools (Ireland) Act 1830	An Act the title of which begins with the words "An Act to amend" and ends with the words "in Ireland."	To "this Act," and from "or other chief" to "time being."
11 Geo. 4. & 1 Will. 4. c. 64	Beerhouse Act 1830	An Act to permit the general Sale of Beer and Cider by Retail in England.	Preamble. Section one, from "from and after" to "thirty." Section thirty, from "from and after" to "thirty."
11 Geo. 4. & 1 Will. 4. c. 66	Forgery Act 1830	An Act the title of which begins with the words "An Act for reducing" and ends with the words "to Forgery."	Title, from "for reducing" to "and" and the word "otherwise."
11 Geo. 4. & 1 Will. 4. c. 69	Court of Session Act 1830	An Act the title of which begins with the words "An Act for uniting" and ends with the words "of Scotland."	Preamble. Section one, to "Act." Section two, to "union." Section three, to "as aforesaid." Section ten, the words "his heirs and successors." Section fourteen, from "and it is hereby" to the end of the section. Section sixteen, from "all rules" to "provided that." Section eighteen, to "interest in" and the words "that office" and from "and . . . the salary" to "shall cease." Section nineteen, from "and for obliging" to "the oaths." Section thirty-one. Section forty-four.
11 Geo. 4. & 1 Will. 4. c. 70	Law Terms Act 1830	An Act for the more effectual Administration of Justice in England and Wales.	Section thirty-one.
1 Will. 4. c. 3	Law Terms (Explanation) Act 1830	An Act the title of which begins with the words "An Act to amend" and ends with the words "certain Cases."	Title, from "to amend" to "thereof; and." Preamble.
1 Will. 4. c. 13	Richmond Lunatic Asylum Act 1831	An Act the title of which begins with the words "An Act to amend" and ends with the words "Lunatic Asylum."	In part; namely,— Section one, to "passing of this Act," and the word "that" before "notwithstanding," and before "the care" and before "all rights."
1 Will. 4. c. 18	Poor Relief (Settlement) Act 1831	An Act the title of which begins with the words "An Act to explain" and ends with the words "of Tenements."	Preamble. Section one, to "this Act."
1 & 2 Will. 4. c. 17	Custos Rotulorum (Ireland) Act 1831	An Act the title of which begins with the words "An Act to provide" and ends with the words "Towns therein."	Section three, the words "or other chief governor or governors of Ireland" occurring twice. Section eighteen, the words "or other chief governor or governors of Ireland" wherever they occur, and the words "or they."
1 & 2 Will. 4. c. 21	Land Tax Act 1831	An Act the title of which begins with the words "An Act to explain" and ends with the words "Land Tax."	Preamble. Section one to "passing of this Act," the words "lords commissioners of his Majesty's," the words "for the time being," the words "the said lords commissioners of," the words "the said commissioners of," and the words "his heirs and successors." Section two, the words "the said lords commissioners of" occurring twice.
1 & 2 Will. 4. c. 22	London Hackney Carriage Act 1831	An Act the title of which begins with the words "An Act to amend" and ends with the words "of Stamps."	Title, from "and to place" to end of title. Preamble.
1 & 2 Will. 4. c. 31	Judicature (Ireland) Act 1831	An Act to improve the Administration of Justice in Ireland.	Preamble. Section one, to "of the same that," and the word "that" before "in case."
1 & 2 Will. 4. c. 33	Public Works (Ireland) Act 1831	An Act for the Extension and Promotion of Public Works in Ireland.	Preamble. Section six, the words "commissioners of his Majesty's" occurring twice, and the words "for the time being." Section eight. Section twelve, the words "commissioners of his Majesty's" and "said commissioners of his Majesty's" and from "or other" to "Ireland." Section thirteen, from "or other" to "Ireland," the words "commissioners of his Majesty's" and "lords commissioners of his Majesty's," and the words "for the time being," occurring twice. Section sixteen, the words "lords commissioners of his Majesty's." Section seventeen, the words "lords commissioners of his Majesty's." Section eighteen, from "or other" to the end of the section. Section nineteen, the words "commissioners of his Majesty's" wherever they occur, the words "such commissioners of," and the words "for the time being." Section twenty-five, the words "commissioners of his Majesty's." Section forty-one, the words "commissioners of his Majesty's." Section fifty-one, the words "commissioners of his Majesty's" and the words "for the time being." Section fifty-three, the words "commissioners of his Majesty's," occurring twice. Section sixty-four, the words "commissioners of his Majesty's." Section sixty-five, the words "commissioners of his Majesty's," and the words "under the hands of the said commissioners." Section sixty-seven, the words "lords commissioners of his Majesty's." Section eighty-two, from "or other" to "of Ireland," and the words "or their." Section eighty-five, the words "commissioners of his Majesty's." Section ninety-five, the words "his heirs or successors." Section ninety-seven, the words "commissioners of his Majesty's" where they first occur, the words "said commissioners of his Majesty's" wherever they occur, the words "for the time being" wherever they occur, and the words "under their hands." Section ninety-eight, the words "said commissioners of his Majesty's" wherever they occur, and the words "for the time being" wherever they occur after "Treasury." Section ninety-nine, the words "commissioners of his Majesty's" where they first occur, the words "for the time being," and the words "said commissioners of his Majesty's," occurring twice. Section one hundred, the words "commissioners of his Majesty's." Section one hundred and one. Section one hundred and six, the words "or other chief governor or governors of Ireland" occurring twice, the words "or them," and from "and by an Act" to "thirty," where it next occurs, and from "and the lord" from where it next occurs, to "Ireland," and from "provided always" to the end of the section. Section one hundred and twelve.
1 & 2 Will. 4. c. 37	Truck Act 1831	An Act the title of which begins with the words "An Act to prohibit" and ends with the words "the Realm."	Section eight, the words "of the governor and company."
1 & 2 Will. 4. c. 44	Tumultuous Risings (Ireland) Act 1831	An Act the title of which begins with the words "An Act to amend" and ends with the words "therein mentioned."	Preamble. Section four, to "Act." Section eight, to "enacted that." Section nine, the words "of debt, bill, plaint" and from "in which" to the end of the section.
1 & 2 Will. 4. c. 57	Reclamation of Lands, etc. (Ireland) Act 1831	An Act to empower Landed Proprietors in Ireland to sink, embank, and remove Obstructions in Rivers.	The whole act.
1 & 2 Will. 4. c. 59	Crown Lands Allotments Act 1831	An Act the title of which begins with the words "An Act to enable" and ends with the words "is situated."	Preamble. Section one, to "of the same that," from "lord high" to "Majesty's," and from "of the United" to "time being," and the words "under his or their hands."
2 & 3 Will. 4. c. 1	Crown Lands Act 1832	An Act the title of which begins with the words "An Act for uniting" and ends with the words "Land Revenues."	Preamble. The words "lord high treasurer or the commissioners of his Majesty's" and "for the time being or any three or more of them," wherever they respectively occur. The words "for the time being, or any three of them" in sections sixteen to eighteen. Section one, to "of the same that," from "his heirs" to "Majesty's" where they first, secondly, and thirdly occur before "woods," and the words "forests and land revenues" where they first, secondly, and thirdly occur. Section seven, the words "and his successors," "His Majesty's" where secondly occurring, and "forests and land revenues." Section eight, the words "his Majesty's," and "forests and land revenues," except where they respectively first occur, and "aforesaid," twice occurring. Section nine, the words "his Majesty's" wherever they occur before "woods," and the words "forests and land revenues" wherever they occur. Section ten, the words "his Majesty's" where they secondly and fourthly occur, and the words "forests and land revenues" where they first and thirdly occur. Section fifteen, the words "he or" and "his and." Section seventeen, from "lord high" where first occurring to "Majesty's" where those words secondly occur, to "his Majesty's." Section twenty-one, the words "his Majesty's" and "forests and land revenues." Section twenty-two, from "lord high" to "Majesty's," where that word first occurs, and the words "or any three or more of them." Section twenty-nine, from "lord high" to "Majesty's," and the words "for the time being."
2 & 3 Will. 4. c. 32	Nisi Prius Court House, Dublin Act 1832	An Act for the Erection of a Nisi Prius Court House in Dublin.	The whole act.
2 & 3 Will. 4. c. 33	Service of Process out of the Jurisdiction (England and Ireland) Act 1832	An Act to effectuate the Service of Process from the Courts of Chancery and Exchequer in England and Ireland respectively.	The whole act.
2 & 3 Will. 4. c. 45	Representation of the People Act 1832	An Act to amend the Representation of the People in England and Wales.	Section three, from "and shall as such" to "incorporated herewith." Section five, from "and shall as such" to "incorporated herewith." Section seven. Section nine. Section ten, to "herewith; and." Section eleven, to "and (D.); and," and from "Provided also that in case" to the end of the section. In section twenty-five, the words "or as such tenant and occupier as aforesaid," and in section twenty-six, the words "or as such occupier and tenant as aforesaid," except in so far as relates to the rights of persons saved by the Representation of the People Act, 1884. Section thirty-two, the words "not included in the Schedule marked (A) to this Act annexed." Section thirty-one. Schedule (A). Schedule (C). Schedule (D), except as to Chatham, Whitehaven, and Merthyr Tydfil.
2 & 3 Will. 4. c. 47	Norfolk and Norwich Assizes Act 1832	An Act for holding the Assizes for the County of Norfolk, and for the City of Norwich and County of the same City, twice in every Year at Norwich.	The whole act.
2 & 3 Will. 4. c. 59	Government Annuities Act 1832	The Government Annuities Act, 1832.	Preamble. The words "the governor and company of," "the governor and company of," and "commissioners of his Majesty's," wherever they occur, except in sections fifteen and eighteen. Section five, to "Gazette." Section six, the words "after the passing of this Act." Section eleven, to "company of" where those words secondly occur. Section twelve, from "commencing on" to "thirty-two," the words "the commissioners of" where secondly occurring, "the said commissioners of," "or any three or more of them," and "under their hands." Section fifteen, to "enacted that," the words "the governor and company of" except where they next after the part first repealed, and the words "or any three or more of them for the time being." Section eighteen, the words "the commissioners of" and "the said commissioners of." Section nineteen, the words "his heirs and successors." Section twenty, from "lord high" first occurring to "Majesty's," the words "or any three or more of them," twice occurring, "for the time being," and from "the said lord" to "commissioners of."
2 & 3 Will. 4. c. 64	Parliamentary Boundaries Act 1832	An Act the title of which begins with the words "An Act to settle" and ends with the words "in Parliament."	Section twenty-six, the words "and divisions," "and of that division, riding, or parts," "or counties, or parts," and "or division, riding, or parts." Section twenty-seven. Section twenty-eight. Section thirty-five, to "declared that." Schedule (M), so much of the fourth column as relates to the divisions of the counties to which the isolated parts mentioned in the second column are to belong.
2 & 3 Will. 4. c. 65	Representation of the People (Scotland) Act 1832	An Act to amend the Representation of the People in Scotland.	Section forty-two, the words "after the passing of this Act." Section forty-four. Section forty-six, from the word "sheriff" to "steward clerk depute; and," and the words "or steward."
2 & 3 Will. 4. c. 71	Prescription Act 1832	An Act for shortening the Time of Prescription in certain Cases.	Preamble. Section one to "of the same that." The words "his heirs or successors" in sections one and two.
2 & 3 Will. 4. c. 81	Russian Dutch Loan Act 1832	An Act to enable His Majesty to carry into effect a Convention made between His said Majesty and the Emperor of all the Russias.	Preamble. Section one, to "of the same that." The words "the lord high treasurer or commissioners of" and "or any three or more of them."
2 & 3 Will. 4. c. 87	Registry of Deeds (Ireland) Act 1832	An Act to regulate the Office for registering Deeds, Conveyances, and Wills in Ireland.	Preamble. Section two, from "lord high" to "his Majesty's," and the words "or any three or more of them." Section three, from "lord high" to "Majesty's" and the words "of the United Kingdom of Great Britain and Ireland." Section four, from "said lord" to "Majesty's." Section eight, the words "from and after the said thirty-first day of December." Section fourteen, to "enacted that." Section twenty-eight, the words "or other chief governor or governors of Ireland," twice occurring. Section thirty-five, the words "or any three or more of them."
2 & 3 Will. 4. c. 88	Representation of the People (Ireland) Act 1832	An Act to amend the Representation of the People of Ireland.	Section sixty-seven, the words "or other chief governor or governors" twice occurring, and the words "or they" and "or their." Section sixty-eight, from "or other" to "of Ireland."
2 & 3 Will. 4. c. 89	Parliamentary Boundaries (Ireland) Act 1832	An Act the title of which begins with the words "An Act to settle and describe the Limits," and ends with the words of Parliament."	Preamble. Section one, to "of the same that." Schedule, so far as it relates to Cashel and Sligo.
2 & 3 Will. 4. c. 92	Privy Council Appeals Act 1832	An Act for transferring the Powers of the High Court of Delegates, both in Ecclesiastical and Maritime Causes, to His Majesty in Council.	Preamble. The words "her heirs or successors," "her heirs or successors," and "his heirs and successors" wherever they occur.
2 & 3 Will. 4. c. 93	Ecclesiastical Courts (Contempt) Act 1832	An Act for enforcing the Process upon Contempts in the Courts Ecclesiastical of England and Ireland.	Preamble. Section one, to "of the same that." The words "the governor or company of" in sections two and three.
2 & 3 Will. 4. c. 100	Tithe Act 1832	An Act for shortening the Time required in Claims of Modus decimandi, or Exemption from or Discharge of Tithes.	Preamble. Section one to "of the same that" and the words "his heirs or successors."
2 & 3 Will. 4. c. 103	Customs and Excise Revenues Audit (Scotland) Act 1832	An Act to provide for the Examination and Audit of the Customs and Excise Revenues in Scotland.	Preamble. Section three, to "thirty-two." Section four, to "October." Section five, the words "his heirs or successors." (Note: The whole act was already repealed by the Inland Revenue Regulation Act 1890 (53 & 54 Vict. c. 21).)
2 & 3 Will. 4. c. 104	Public Accounts Act 1832	An Act the title of which begins with the words "An Act for the" and ends with the words "the Crown."	Section one, from "at the receipt" to "October in every year."
2 & 3 Will. 4. c. 108	Special Constables (Ireland) Act 1832	An Act for amending the Laws in Ireland relative to the Appointment of Special Constables, and for the better Preservation of the Peace.	Preamble. Section one, to "of the same that." The words "or other chief governor or governors of Ireland" in sections one, two, three, and nine, and the words "or they" in section three.
2 & 3 Will. 4. c. 111	Lord Chancellor's Pension Act 1832	An Act . . . to make provision for the Lord High Chancellor on his Retirement from Office.	Section three, to "enacted that" the words "his heirs and successors" twice occurring, from "at the public" to "such office," and the words "or they" and "his heirs or successors."
2 & 3 Will. 4. c. 112	Crown Lands (Scotland) Act 1832	An Act the title of which begins with the words "An Act to authorize," and ends with the words "Land Revenues."	Preamble. Section one, to "of the same that," from "lord high" to "Majesty's," where first occurring, from "of the United" to "or more of them," the words "he and," "is and," "under his or their hand or hands," "his heirs or successors" (thrice occurring), and "his heirs and successors."
2 & 3 Will. 4. c. 115	Roman Catholic Charities Act 1832	An Act the title of which begins with the words "An Act for the," and ends with the words "Catholic Religion."	Preamble. Section one, to "this Act."
2 & 3 Will. 4. c. 116	Lord Lieutenants' and Lord Chancellors' Salaries (Ireland) Act 1832	An Act to provide for the Salaries of certain High and Judicial Officers, and of Payments heretofore made out of the Civil List Revenues.	Preamble. Section one, to "of the same that." The words "his heirs and successors" wherever they occur. Section three, the words "general and general governor," "for the time being," and from "at the four" to the end of the section. Section twelve, from "at the four" to the end of the section.
2 & 3 Will. 4. c. 120	Stage Carriages Act 1832	An Act the title of which begins with the words "An Act to repeal," and ends with the words "relates thereto."	Preamble. Section one hundred and two, the words "of debt, bill, plaint," and from "wherein no" to "shall be allowed." Section one hundred and seventeen, from "that the term and expression" to "and successors."
3 & 4 Will. 4. c. 13	Public Revenue (Scotland) Act 1833	An Act the title of which begins with the words "An Act to provide," and ends with the words "of Taxes."	Preamble. Section one, to "passing of this Act," where those words first occur, from "lord high" to "his Majesty's," and the words "of the United Kingdom, for the time being." Section two, the words "said commissioners of his Majesty's" (twice occurring) "or any three of them," and "to be made and signed by them." Section four, to "this Act" and the word "stewardries." Section six, from "said lord" to "his Majesty's" where first occurring, and the words "lord high treasurer or any three or more of the commissioners of his Majesty's" where first occurring.
3 & 4 Will. 4. c. 22	Sewers Act 1833	An Act to amend the Laws relating to Sewers.	Preamble. Section one, to "of the same that." Section four, from "of debt" to "plaint, suit," and from "wherein no" to "be allowed." Section twelve, to "enacted that." Section thirteen, to "enacted that." Section eighteen, to "enacted that."
3 & 4 Will. 4. c. 24	Government Annuities Act 1833	The Government Annuities Act, 1833.	Preamble. Section one, to "from and after the passing of this Act." The words "the governor and company of" wherever they occur in sections three and four.
3 & 4 Will. 4. c. 41	Judicial Committee Act 1833	An Act for the better Administration of Justice in His Majesty's Privy Council.	Preamble. Section one, to "of the same that."
3 & 4 Will. 4. c. 46	Burgh Police (Scotland) Act 1833	An Act to enable Burghs in Scotland to establish a general System of Police.	The whole act.
3 & 4 Will. 4. c. 69	Crown Lands Act 1833	An Act the title of which begins with the words "An Act to extend" and ends with the words "in Scotland."	Preamble. The words "his heirs or successors" wherever they occur; and the words "his heirs and successors" wherever they occur. Section seven, the words "or them." The words "the governor and company of" in sections twelve and thirteen. Section twelve, from "lord high" where first occurring to "Majesty's" next occurring, and from "said lord" to "Majesty's." Section fourteen, from "lord high" to "Majesty's" (next occurring), and the words "for the time being." Section fifteen, from "said lord" where first occurring, to "Majesty's," the words "him or," from "under the hand" to "time being and," and the words "the said governor and company of."
3 & 4 Will. 4. c. 71	Assizes Act 1833	An Act for the Appointment of convenient Places for the holding of Assizes in England and Wales.	Preamble. Section two, from "and sessions," where those words first occur, to "appointed," where those words first occur; the words "and sessions for the despatch of criminal and civil business," and the words "and sessions under such commission."
3 & 4 Will. 4. c. 74	Fines and Recoveries Act 1833	An Act for the Abolition of Fines and Recoveries, and for the Substitution of more simple Modes of Assurance.	The words "his heirs and successors" in sections fifteen, nineteen, sixty-eight, and seventy-two.
3 & 4 Will. 4. c. 78	Grand Jury (Ireland) Act 1833	An Act to amend the Laws relating to Grand Juries in Ireland.	Section eighty-seven, from "lord high" to "Majesty's," and the words "or any three of them."
3 & 4 Will. 4. c. 82	Separatists' Affirmations Act 1833	An Act to allow the People called Separatists to make a solemn Affirmation and Declaration instead of an Oath.	The whole act.
3 & 4 Will. 4. c. 85	Government of India Act 1833	An Act for effecting an Arrangement with the East India Company, and for the better Government of His Majesty's Indian Territories, till the Thirtieth Day of April, One thousand eight hundred and fifty-four.	Preamble. Section one, to "thirty-four" where first occurring; the word "that" before "all the," the word "said" before "twenty-second," and the words "his heirs and successors." Section nineteen. Section forty-eight, from "that all laws and" to "assembled and." Section sixty-four. Section sixty-nine. Section seventy-four, from "countersigned" to "commissioners," and from "provided that" to the end of the section. Section seventy-five, from "provided that" to the end of the section. Sections eighty-one to eighty-three. Section eighty-five. Section eighty-nine, to "enacted, that." Section ninety-five. Section one hundred and twelve, the words "his heirs and successors." Repealed as to all Her Majesty's dominions.
3 & 4 Will. 4. c. 86	Crown Lands (Scotland) Act 1833	An Act to provide for the Payment of certain ancient Grants and Allowances formerly paid out of the Civil List Revenues.	To "of the same that," the words "commissioners of his Majesty's," from "at the United" where those words secondly occur, to "more of them," from "lord high" to "said thirty-one," and the words "the commissioners of" where they lastly occur.
3 & 4 Will. 4. c. 90	Lighting and Watching Act 1833	An Act the title of which begins with the words "An Act to repeal" and ends with the words "lieu thereof."	Section four, to "enacted that." Section fifty, the words "of debt, or on the case, or by bill, plaint," and from "wherein no" to "be allowed."
3 & 4 Will. 4. c. 98	Bank of England Act 1833	An Act the title of which begins with the words "An Act for giving" and ends with the words "certain conditions."	Preamble. Section one, to "company of." The words "the governor and company of" and "the said governor and company of" wherever they occur in sections three and four. Section six, the words "the governor and company of" where they first occur.
3 & 4 Will. 4. c. 99	Fines Act 1833	An Act the title of which begins with the words "An Act for facilitating" and ends with the words "of Exchequer."	Preamble. Section twelve, to "October next," and the words "forests and land revenue." Section thirteen, from "lord high," to "Majesty's," and the words "he and" and "under his or their hands." Section twenty-three, from "lord high" to "of his Majesty's." Section twenty-four, from "lord high" to "Majesty's." Section twenty-five, from "lord high" to "Majesty's." Section twenty-six, the words "commissioners of his Majesty's." Section twenty-eight, from "lord high" to "Majesty's," and the words "under his or their hands." Section twenty-nine, the words "commissioners of his Majesty's." Section thirty-one, the words "commissioners of his Majesty's." Section thirty-three, from "lord high" to "Majesty's" both twice occurring, and the words "he or" "under his or their hands" and "said." Section thirty-five, from "lord high" to "Majesty's" and the words "under his or their hands." Section thirty-nine, the words "his heirs and successors." Section forty-seven, from "lord high" to "of his Majesty's."
4 & 5 Will. 4. c. 24	Superannuation Act 1834	An Act the title of which begins with the words "An Act to alter" and ends with the words "Majesty's service."	The words "commissioners of his Majesty's" wherever they occur. Section eighteen, the words "or any three or more of them." Section twenty-one, the words "the commissioners of." Section twenty-eight, the words "the commissioners of" where secondly occurring.
4 & 5 Will. 4. c. 30	Common Fields Exchange Act 1834	An Act to facilitate the Exchange of Lands lying in Common Fields.	Preamble. Section one, to "passing of this Act." Section twenty-six, the words "his heirs and successors."
4 & 5 Will. 4. c. 36	Central Criminal Court Act 1834	The Central Criminal Court Act, 1834.	Preamble. Section one, to "of the same that." The words "his heirs and successors" and "and his heirs and successors" in sections one, two, and twenty-one. Section five, to "enacted that" and the word "that" before "when and so."
4 & 5 Will. 4. c. 51	Excise Management Act 1834	An Act to amend the Laws relating to the Collection and Management of the Revenue of Excise.	Preamble. Section one, to "of the same that." Section thirteen, the words "the lord high treasurer or commissioners of" and "the said lord high treasurer or commissioners of." Section fourteen, the words "commissioners of his Majesty's." Section twenty, to "enacted that." Section twenty-four, to "enacted that." Section twenty-nine, from "the lord" to "the commissioners of," and the words "his heirs and successors." Section thirty, to "enacted that" and from "the word or words" to "printed; and when."
4 & 5 Will. 4. c. 61	Bridges (Ireland) Act 1834	An Act for the more effectually providing for the Erection of certain Bridges in Ireland.	The words "or other chief governor or governors of Ireland" and "or other chief governor or governors," wherever they occur. The words "or they" in section two (where first occurring), four, and nine. Section four, the words "or their." Section eight, the words "lords commissioners of his Majesty's" and "for the time being" where last occurring.
4 & 5 Will. 4. c. 82	Service of Process out of the Jurisdiction England and Ireland Act 1834	An Act to amend an Act of the Second Year of His present Majesty, to effectuate the Service of Process from the Courts of Chancery and Exchequer in England and Ireland.	The whole act.
4 & 5 Will. 4. c. 92	Fines and Recoveries (Ireland) Act 1834	An Act for the Abolition of Fines and Recoveries, and for the Substitution of more simple Modes of Assurance, in Ireland.	The words "his heirs and successors" in sections twelve and sixteen.
5 & 6 Will. 4. c. 20	Stamps and Taxes Act 1835	An Act to consolidate certain Offices in the Collection of the Revenues of Stamps and Taxes, and to amend the Laws relating thereto.	Preamble. The words "commissioners of his Majesty's" and "said commissioners of his Majesty's" wherever they occur. Section eight, the words "his heirs or successors" and "the commissioners of" where lastly occurring. (Note: The whole act was already repealed by the Inland Revenue Regulation Act 1890 (53 & 54 Vict. c. 21).)
5 & 6 Will. 4. c. 26	Assizes (Ireland) Act 1835	An Act for the Appointment of convenient Places for the holding of Assizes in Ireland.	Preamble. The words "or other chief governor or governors of Ireland" and "or other chief governor or governors" wherever they occur. Section two, from "and sessions" to next following "business" where those words respectively thrice occur. Section three, the word "there." Section four, the words "and sessions as aforesaid."
5 & 6 Will. 4. c. 27	Linen Manufactures (Ireland) Act 1835	An Act to continue and amend certain Regulations for the Linen and Hempen Manufactures in Ireland.	Preamble. Section one, to "of this Act." Section eleven, to "enacted that" and the word "such" before "loan." Section fourteen, from "or other chief" to next following "time being" wherever those words respectively occur, and the words "or and" and "or they." Section seventeen, the words "or other chief governor or governors of Ireland" wherever they occur, and the words "or their" and "for the time being." Section thirty-six, the words "bill, plaint, or" and from "wherein no" to "be allowed."
5 & 6 Will. 4. c. 35	Paymaster General Act 1835	An Act the title of which begins with the words "An Act for consolidating" and ends with the words "the Ordnance."	Preamble. Section one, to "passing of this Act" the words "his heirs and successors," from "the lord" to "commissioners of," and from "of the United" to "more of them." Section three, from "lord high" to "Majesty's," and from "for the time" to the end of the section. Section four, from "the lord" to "commissioners of" and from "for the time" to "more of them." Section seven, the words "his heirs or successors." Section ten, to "enacted that" from "the lord" first occurring, to "commissioners of," where those words next occur, from "for the time" to "more of them" where those words first occur, the words "he and," "he or," "the governor and company of," from "lord high" secondly occurring, to "Majesty's," and the words "or any three or more of them" secondly occurring. Section eleven, the words "the commissioners of."
5 & 6 Will. 4. c. 42	Insolvency Courts Act 1835	An Act the title of which begins with the words "An Act to authorize" and ends with the words "Insolvent Debtors."	Preamble. Section one, to "passing of this Act" and the words "commissioners of his Majesty's" and "under the hands of any three or more of them."
5 & 6 Will. 4. c. 52	India (North-West Provinces) Act 1835	An Act the title of which begins with the words "An Act to authorize" and ends with the words "of Agra."	Preamble. Section one. Section two, from "and from time to time" to the end of the section. Repealed as to all Her Majesty's dominions.
5 & 6 Will. 4. c. 55	Sheriffs (Ireland) Act 1835	An Act the title of which begins with the words "An Act for facilitating" and ends with the words "Great Britain."	Preamble. Section one to "of this Act." Section two, the words "or other governor or governors of Ireland" (twice occurring), "or governors," and "or other chief governor or governors." Section twelve, from "lord high" to next following "Majesty's," the words "he or," the words "under their hands," from "lord treasurer" to next following "Majesty's," and the words "or other chief governor or governors of Ireland." Section fourteen, from "lord high" to "Majesty's," and the words "under his or their hand or hands." Section thirty-nine, from "lord high" to next following "Majesty's," where those words respectively twice occur, and the words "he and," "he or," and "said" before "lord."
5 & 6 Will. 4. c. 58	Crown Lands (Scotland) Act 1835	An Act to amend the Acts relating to the Hereditary Land Revenues of the Crown in Scotland.	Preamble. Section one to "of the same that," the words "his heirs and successors," from "lord high" where first occurring, to "Majesty's," from "or any" to "time being," where first occurring, and the words "the lord high treasurer or the commissioners of," and the words "for the time being" where they secondly occur. Section three, to "enacted that," the words "his heirs and successors" and "his heirs or successors" wherever they occur, the words "or they," from "lord high" to "Majesty's," from "for the time" to "more of them," and the words "under his or their hand or hands." Section five, the words "from and after the passing of this Act."
5 & 6 Will. 4. c. 62	Statutory Declarations Act 1835	The Statutory Declarations Act, 1835.	Section two, the words "lords commissioners of his Majesty's" twice occurring, and the words "or any three of them." Section three, the words "said" and "or any three of them." Section four, the words "lords commissioners of his Majesty's." Section five, to "enacted that." Section thirteen, to "this Act." Section fifteen, to "this Act." Section seventeen, the words "his heirs and successors," twice occurring, "and their" and "or their." Repealed as to all Her Majesty's dominions.
5 & 6 Will. 4. c. 65	Lectures Copyright Act 1835	An Act for preventing the Publication of Lectures without Consent.	Section one, to "thirty-five," the word "that," and the words "his heirs or successors."
5 & 6 Will. 4. c. 69	Union and Parish Property Act 1835	An Act the title of which begins with the words "An Act to facilitate" and ends with the words "and Wales."	Preamble. Section one, to "of the same that," the words "the King's Majesty's" "forests and land revenues," from "lord high" to "Majesty's," and the words "or any three or more of them."
6 & 7 Will. 4. c. 13	Constabulary (Ireland) Act 1836	An Act to consolidate the Laws relating to the Constabulary Force in Ireland.	Preamble. The words "or other chief governor or governors of Ireland" and "or other chief governor or governors" wherever they occur. Section five, the words "or their" and "or they." Section six, to "enacted that," from "the lord high" to "commissioners of" and the words "or any three or more of them." Section ten, the words "or they." Section eleven, the words "or them" twice occurring. Section fifteen, the words "his heirs and successors," and from "or commission" to "gaol delivery." Section twenty-four, the words "for the time being." Section thirty-one, the words "or their" thrice occurring. Section thirty-five, from "lord high" where first occurring, to "Majesty's," from "or any three" where first occurring, to "time being," the words "he or," from "the said lord" to "commissioners of," and the words "or any three or more of them" lastly occurring. Section thirty-seven, from "the lords" to "commissioners of," and the words "or any three or more of them." Section thirty-eight, the words "or any three or more of them" wherever they occur, from "the said lord" where secondly occurring, to "commissioners of" where next occurring, and from "the lord high" where lastly occurring to "commissioners of." Section thirty-nine, from "lord high" to "Majesty's," and the words "or any three or more of them." Section forty, the words "or any three or more of them" and "the said commissioners of." Section forty-one, the words "the governor and company of." Section forty-nine, the words "the said lords commissioners of."
6 & 7 Will. 4. c. 19	Durham (County Palatine) Act 1836	An Act for separating the Palatine Jurisdiction of the County Palatine of Durham from the Bishoprick of Durham.	Section one, to "of this Act" where first occurring; the words "his heirs and successors" twice occurring, and "that" before "all forfeitures." The words "and his successors" in sections one and three.
6 & 7 Will. 4. c. 28	Government Offices Security Act 1836	An Act the title of which begins with the words "An Act to enable" and ends with the words "Stamps and Taxes."	Preamble. The words "commissioners of his Majesty's" and "the governor and company of" wherever they occur. Section one, to "passing of this Act," the word "said" before "commissioners," and the words "or any three or more of them" twice occurring. Section thirteen, from "the said" to "company of."
6 & 7 Will. 4. c. 29	Dublin Police Act 1836	An Act for improving the Police in the District of Dublin Metropolis.	Preamble. The words "or other chief governor or governors of Ireland" wherever they occur. Section one, to "of the same that," the words "of the Lord Lieutenant," "or other chief governor or governors" and "or they." Section four, the words "of the lord lieutenant." Section ten, from "the lord" to "commissioners of" where first occurring, the words "or any three or more of them" twice occurring, and from "the said lord" to "commissioners of" where secondly occurring. Section eleven, from "the said lord" to next following "commissioners of" where those words respectively twice occur, and the words "of the lord lieutenant." Section twelve, the words "of the lord lieutenant." Section thirteen, the words "the governor and company of." Section sixteen, the words "of the lord lieutenant," from "the said lord" to "commissioners of," and the words "or any three of them." Section twenty-one, the words "of the lord lieutenant" and "his." Section forty-two, to "enacted that."
6 & 7 Will. 4. c. 36	Constabulary (Ireland) Act 1836 (No. 2)	An Act the title of which begins with the words "An Act to amend" and ends with the words "Force in Ireland."	Preamble. Section two, the words "or other chief governor or governors."
6 & 7 Will. 4. c. 71	Tithe Act 1836	An Act for the Commutation of Tithes in England and Wales.	Sections seventeen to twenty-eight. Section twenty-nine, from "and that in case" to "had been given." Sections thirty-two to fifty-five. Section fifty-seven, from "at the prices" to "this Act," and the words "so ascertained." Section fifty-eight, to "recognizance; and." Sections fifty-nine to sixty-one, sixty-three, and sixty-five. Section sixty-seven, from "the first payment" to "as aforesaid." Sections seventy-nine, eighty-eight, and eighty-nine. Provided that this repeal shall not extend to any tithes which have not been commuted.
6 & 7 Will. 4. c. 74	Court of Chancery (Ireland) Act 1836	An Act the title of which begins with the words "An Act to abolish" and ends with the words "Duties thereof."	Preamble. Section two, the words "his heirs and successors," "and their," and "or of any of his heirs and successors."
6 & 7 Will. 4. c. 77	Ecclesiastical Commissioners Act 1836	An Act the title of which begins with the words "An Act for carrying" and ends with the words "and Patronage."	Section seven, from "lord high" to "Majesty's," and the words "or any three or more of them."
6 & 7 Will. 4. c. 86	Births and Deaths Registration Act 1836	An Act for registering Births, Deaths, and Marriages in England.	Preamble. Section thirty-nine, the words "the lords commissioners of."
6 & 7 Will. 4. c. 87	Liberties Act 1836	An Act for extinguishing the Secular Jurisdiction of the Archbishop of York and the Bishop of Ely in certain Liberties in the Counties of York, Nottingham, and Cambridge.	Preamble. The words "his heirs and successors" wherever they occur. Sections one, four, and nineteen.
6 & 7 Will. 4. c. 106	Stannaries Act 1836	An Act the title of which begins with the words "An Act to make" and ends with the words "said Stannaries."	Preamble. Section one, to "crown vice warden," and from "and his successors" to "time being" where those words next occur. Section two, from "and his successors" to "time being" next following. Section twenty-two, the words "his heirs and successors, King or Queen regnant of England for the time being" where they twice occur. Section twenty-five, to "enacted that," the word "that" before "if any" and before "the successor." Section forty, to "enacted that," and the word "that" before "all and."
6 & 7 Will. 4. c. 107	Poor Relief (Loans) Act 1836	An Act the title of which begins with the words "An Act to extend" and ends with the words "England and Wales."	Preamble, from "And whereas." Section one, the words "lords commissioners of his Majesty's" twice occurring, and "or of any three or more of them" twice occurring.
6 & 7 Will. 4. c. 108	Public Works (Ireland) Act 1836	An Act the title of which begins with the words "An Act to amend" and ends with the words "in Ireland."	Preamble. The words "the lords commissioners of," "the said lords commissioners of" wherever they occur in sections three, five, and fifteen. The words "lords commissioners of his Majesty's" wherever they occur in sections six, ten, eleven, twelve, sixteen, and seventeen. Section four to "enacted that." Section seventeen, the words "the said lords commissioners of" where first occurring, and the word "said" where lastly occurring.
6 & 7 Will. 4. c. 110	Copyright Act 1836	An Act the title of which begins with the words "An Act to repeal" and ends with the words "in Dublin."	Preamble. Section two, from "lord high" to "Majesty's" where first occurring, the words "or any three or more of them" twice occurring, and "commissioners of his Majesty's" where secondly occurring. Section three, from "said lord" to "Majesty's" and the words "him or."
6 & 7 Will. 4. c. 115	Inclosure Act 1836	An Act for facilitating the Inclosure of Open and Arable Fields in England and Wales.	Preamble. Section one, to "of this Act." The words "his heirs and successors" wherever they occur in sections fifty-seven and fifty-nine.
6 & 7 Will. 4. c. 116	Grand Jury (Ireland) Act 1836	An Act to consolidate and amend the Laws relating to the Presentment of Public Money by Grand Juries in Ireland.	Preamble. Section one, to "commencement of this Act." The word "of Ireland" wherever they occur in sections thirty-eight, forty-three, sixty-one, sixty-four, ninety, ninety-one, ninety-three, one hundred and seventy-six, one hundred and seventy-nine. The words "lords commissioners of His Majesty's" and "or any three or more of them," wherever they occur in sections sixty-two, one hundred and one. The words "or other chief governor or governors" wherever they occur in sections sixty-one, ninety, one hundred and seventy-six, one hundred and seventy-seven, one hundred and seventy-nine. Section three, from "the word 'lord'" to "being; and." Section four, to "this Act" where first occurring. Section eight, from "after the passing" to "first assizes." Section twenty-four, the words "his heirs and successors." Section thirty-eight, to "this Act." Section forty-five, the words "now appointed, or." Section forty-six, the words "after the passing of this Act." Section forty-seven, the words "from and after the commencement of this Act." Section sixty-one, the words "for the time being." Section eighty-one, the words "or dispensary, whenever they occur; the words 'in case of a county fever hospital,' and, in the words 'if appointed after the passing of this Act,'" and the words "dispensary." Section eighty-four, the words "the lords commissioners of." Section eighty-six, from "nor unless such" to "of such infirmary." Section ninety, from "lords" to "Majesty's." Section one hundred and seventy-eight, the words "from and after the passing of this Act," from "lord" to "Majesty's," and the words "or any three of them."

== Omitted acts ==
Section 2 of the act provided that acts listed in the second schedule could be omitted from any revised edition of the statutes published by authority after the passing of the act, treating them as if they were local and personal acts.

Citation	Short title	Title	Extent of omission
3 Geo. 4. c. 126	Turnpike Roads Act 1822	An Act to amend the General Laws now in being for regulating Turnpike Roads in that Part of Great Britain called England.	The whole Act, except such provisions as are applied to disturnpiked roads by the Annual Turnpike Acts Continuance Act, 1868 and 1870.
4 Geo. 4. c. 16	Turnpike Roads (Tolls on Lime) Act 1823	An Act to explain so much of the General Turnpike Act as relates to the Toll payable on Carriages laden with Lime for the Improvement of Land.	The whole act.
4 Geo. 4. c. 95	Turnpike Roads Act 1823	An Act the title of which begins with the words "An Act to amend" and ends with the words "called England."	The whole act.
5 Geo. 4. c. 69	Turnpike Roads Act 1824	An Act to enable Justices of the Peace for Ridings, Divisions, or Sokes to act as Trustees for repairing and maintaining Turnpike Roads.	The whole act.
7 & 8 Geo. 4. c. 24	Turnpike Roads (England) Act 1827	An Act to amend the Acts for regulating Turnpike Roads in England.	The whole act.
9 Geo. 4. c. 77	Turnpike Roads (England) Act 1828	An Act to amend the Acts for regulating Turnpike Roads.	The whole act.
1 & 2 Will. 4. c. 25	Turnpikes Act 1831	An Act to amend the Acts for regulating Turnpike Roads in England, so far as they relate to certain Exemptions from Toll.	The whole act.
2 & 3 Will. 4. c. 124	Turnpikes Act 1832	An Act to explain certain Provisions in Local Acts of Parliament relating to Double Toll on Turnpike Roads.	The whole act.
3 & 4 Will. 4. c. 80	Turnpike Trusts Returns Act 1833	An Act requiring the Annual Statements of Trustees or Commissioners of Turnpike Roads to be transmitted to the Secretary of State, and afterwards laid before Parliament.	The whole act.
4 & 5 Will. 4. c. 81	Turnpike Tolls (Allowance of Wagon Weights) Act 1834	An Act the title of which begins with the words "An Act to amend" and ends with the words "with Springs."	The whole act.
5 & 6 Will. 4. c. 18	Turnpike Tolls Act 1835	An Act to exempt Carriages carrying Manure from Toll.	The whole act.

== See also ==
- Statute Law Revision Act
