= Church of Scotland Act 1824 =

Act of the Parliament of the United Kingdom

Church of Scotland Act 1824 (Note: The citation of this act by this short title was authorised by section 5 of, and the second schedule to, the Statute Law Revision Act 1948. Due to the repeal of those provisions, it is now authorised by section 19(2) of the Interpretation Act 1978.)
- Act of Parliament
- Parliament of the United Kingdom
- Long title: An Act to amend an Act for building additional Places of Worship in the Highlands and Islands of Scotland. (Note: These words are printed against this act in the second column of the second schedule to the Statute Law Revision Act 1948, which is headed "Title".)
- Citation: 5 Geo. 4. c. 90
- Territorial extent: United Kingdom

Dates
- Royal assent: 21 June 1824
- Commencement: 21 June 1824 (Note: The Acts of Parliament (Commencement) Act 1793.)
- Repealed: 18 July 1973
Other legislation
Amends	Additional Places of Worship in the Highlands Act 1823
Amended by	Statute Law Revision Act 1873; Statute Law Revision Act 1874; Statute Law Revision Act 1890; Church of Scotland (Property and Endowments) Act 1925
Repealed by	Statute Law (Repeals) Act 1973

Status: Repealed

Text of statute as originally enacted

The Church of Scotland Act 1824 (5 Geo. 4. c. 90), sometimes referred to as the Church Building (Scotland) Act 1824, was an act of the Parliament of the United Kingdom.

== Subsequent developments ==
The preamble to, and section 1 of, the act were repealed by section 1 of, and the schedule to, the Statute Law Revision Act 1890 (53 & 54 Vict. c. 33). The same act repealed the words "commissioners of His Majesty's" and "of the United Kingdom of Great Britain and Ireland" from section 2, "his heirs and successors" from section 14, and "the said commissioners of", wherever they occurred, and the words "or any three or more of them for the time being" from section 30.

Section 23 and 24 were repealed by the Church of Scotland (Property and Endowments) Act 1925 (15 & 16 Geo. 5. c. 33), in addition to mentions of the payment of stipend in sections 13 and 14.

The whole act was repealed by section 1(1) of, and part III of schedule 1 to, the Statute Law (Repeals) Act 1973, which came into force on 18 July 1973.
