= Select Committee on the Statute Law Revision Bill =

United Kingdom House of Commons select committee

- Formation: March 18, 1890
- Founder: Sir Edward Clarke MP
- Dissolved: May 6, 1890
- Chair: Sir Edward Clarke MP
- Key people: See § membership
- Parent organization: House of Commons
- Website: Report

The Select Committee on the Statute Law Revision Bill was a select committee of the House of Commons of the Parliament of the United Kingdom appointed to consider the bill for the Statute Law Revision Act 1890 (53 & 54 Vict. c. 33).

== Background ==
In the United Kingdom, acts of Parliament remain in force until expressly repealed. Blackstone's Commentaries on the Laws of England, published in the late 18th-century, raised questions about the system and structure of the common law and the poor drafting and disorder of the existing statute book.

In 1889, the Interpretation Act 1889 (52 & 53 Vict. c. 63) was passed, which generalised definitions used in acts of Parliament and provided rules of statutory construction. This rendered enactments unnecessary, for example the words "the Commissioners of Her Majesty's" before the word "Treasury" or the words "heirs and successors" after reference to the monarch.

The Statute Law Revision Bill was first introduced in 1889 and had its first reading in the House of Lords on 26 July 1889, introduced by the Lord Chancellor, Hardinge Giffard, 1st Baron Halsbury. The bill had its second reading in the House of Lords on 1 August 1889 and was committed to a Committee of the Whole House, which met and reported on 8 August 1889, with amendments.

The amended bill had its first reading in the House of Commons on 9 August 1889. The bill was withdrawn in the last week of the session, on 16 August 1889, following opposition on the ground that it sought to repeal enactments of the present reign without the authority of a select committee of the House of Commons. This led to delays in the publication of the new revised edition of the statutes.

On 14 February 1890, the Attorney General, Richard Webster MP, confirmed the intention of the government to re-introduce the bill. The re-introduced Statute Law Revision Bill had its first reading in the House of Lords on 20 February 1890. The bill had its second reading in the House of Lords on 3 March 1890 and was committed to a Committee of the Whole House, which met and reported on 6 March 1890, with amendments. The amended bill had its third reading in the House of Lords on 10 March 1890 and passed, without amendments.

The bill had its first reading in the House of Commons on 11 March 1890.

== Establishment ==
On 17 March 1890, the Statute Law Revision Bill had its second reading in the House of Commons, during which the bill was referred to a select committee, to address objections of members of parliament, including Henry Fowler MP.

=== Membership ===
The committee was appointed on 18 March 1890, consisting of 10 members with a quorum of five and the power to "send for persons, paper and records". The quorum was reduced to three on 2 May 1890.

Name	Party	Commentary
Sir Edward Clarke	Conservative	Solicitor General, Chair
Charles Isaac Elton	Conservative	
Edward Whitley	Conservative	
William Ambrose	Conservative	
James Bryce	Liberal	
H. H. Asquith	Liberal	
George Howell	Liberal-Labour	
Francis William Maclean	Liberal Unionist Party	
T. M. Healy	Irish Parliamentary Party	

The select committee was assisted by Mr. Gray and Henry Studdy Theobald, the draftsmen of the bill, and Mr. Makin, the secretary of the Statute Law Committee.

== Report ==
=== Statute Law Revision Bill ===
The select committee first met on 25 March 1890, 26 March 1890, 27 March 1890, 28 March 1890, 22 April 1890, 25 April 1890, 29 April 1890, 2 May 1890 and 6 May 1890.

On 5 May 1890, the Solicitor General, Sir Edward Clarke MP, made a special report out of the select committee to the House of Commons.

The select committee reported that:

...they desire to express their sense of the great caution and accuracy with which the Bill has been prepared, and their opinion that the Statute Law Committee and its assistants have fully justified the confidence which has been shown in them by both Houses of Parliament.
In examining the statutes in order to consider the verbal amendments proposed, your committee came to the conclusion that the process of revision might be safely made much more extensive and valuable by the repeal of such of the preambles of these Acts as, having regard to the provisions of the third section of this Bill, were not required for the purpose of explaining or interpreting the Acts to which they were prefixed, and were not of any such historical interest and importance as to make it desirable that they should be reprinted in future and revised editions of the statutes."

The select committee also supported removing unnecessary formal language and eliminating historically unimportant preambles from the revised edition of the statutes.

The select committee also prepared a list of other acts of Parliament not contained in the bill to be repealed in a future Statute Law Revision Act.

The select committee disagreed with the provided that certain Turnpike Acts which now apply to a very few cases where the trusts have not yet been extinguished should be repealed by an order of the Local Government Board. Instead, they inserted a clause providing that Turnpike Acts shall be local and personal acts and thus not printed in the new edition of the revised edition of the statutes.

The select committee also reported that many still unrepealed statutes, especially as well as to many acts of the Parliament of Ireland before the Union or those repealed for England and Wales only, could be repealed for Scotland and Ireland, and recommended unifying future repeals across the three jurisdictions of the United Kingdom, through the drafting of consolidation bills.

=== Other bills ===
On 24 March 1890, the Lunacy (Consolidation) Bill was committed to the select committee, which reported on 25 March 1890, without amendments.

On 14 April 1890, the Inland Revenue Regulation Bill was committed to the select committee, which reported on 6 May 1890, with amendments.

== Legacy ==
=== Statute Law Revision Bill ===
The amended bill was re-committed to a Committee of the Whole House on 5 May 1890, which met on 12 May 1890 and expressed support of the recommendations made by the select committee. In a speech in the House of Lords on 13 June 1890, the report of the select committee was endorsed by the Lord Chancellor, Hardinge Giffard, 1st Earl of Halsbury.

The committee of the whole house met again on 2 July 1890 (following a number of deferrals) and 14 July 1890, during which an attempt to repeal the Justices of the Peace Act 1361 (34 Edw. 3. c. 1) and a motion by Frederick Cornwallis Conybeare MP to report progress was rejected. The committee reported on 14 July 1890, with amendments. The amended bill had had its third reading in the House of Commons on 14 July 1890 and passed, with amendments. During debate, an objection to the third reading made by Dr Charles Kearns Deane Tanner MP was rejected.

The amended bill was considered by the House of Lords on 28 July 1890, who agreed to some amendments, disagreed with others and made some consequential amendments. The report of the select committee was adopted by the House of Lords after consideration by leading legal peers, including Lord Thring and Lord Herschell, and consultation with the Statute Law Committee. This resulted in amendments to the bill to authorise the omission, not repeal, of certain preambles and the addition of words to preambles into the revised edition of the statutes. A committee was appointed to report reasons to the House of Commons, which reported on 28 July 1890.

The report was received by the House of Commons on 29 July 1890, and the amended bill was considered and agreed to by the House of Commons on 1 August 1890.

The bill was granted royal assent on 4 August 1890, becoming the Statute Law Revision Act 1890 (53 & 54 Vict. c. 33).

=== Other bills ===
On 29 March 1890, the Lunacy Act 1890 (53 & 54 Vict. c. 5) was passed, which consolidated enactments relating to mental health law of the United Kingdom.

On 25 July 1890, the Inland Revenue Regulation Act 1890 (53 & 54 Vict. c. 21) was passed, which consolidated enactments relating to inland revenue in the United Kingdom.

== See also ==
- Statute Law Revision Act
