= Inland Revenue Regulation Act 1890 =

Act of the Parliament of the United Kingdom

Inland Revenue Regulation Act 1890 (Note: Section 42.)
- Act of Parliament
- Parliament of the United Kingdom
- Long title: An Act to consolidate certain Enactments relating to the Regulation of the Inland Revenue.
- Citation: 53 & 54 Vict. c. 21
- Introduced by: William Jackson MP (Commons)
- Territorial extent: United Kingdom

Dates
- Royal assent: 25 July 1890
- Commencement: 1 October 1890 (Note: Section 3.)
- Repealed: 7 April 2005 (Note: The Commissioners for Revenue and Customs Act 2005 (Commencement) Order 2005 (SI 2005/1126).)
Other legislation
Amends	See § Repealed enactments
Repeals/revokes	See § Repealed enactments
Amended by	Public Authorities Protection Act 1893; Statute Law Revision Act 1908; Territorial Army and Militia Act 1921; Local Government Act 1933; Customs and Excise Act 1952; Finance Act 1969; Criminal Justice Act 1972; Statute Law (Repeals) Act 1974; Interpretation Act 1978; Statute Law (Repeals) Act 1978; Law Reform (Miscellaneous Provisions) (Scotland) Act 1980; Statute Law (Repeals) Act 1986
Repealed by	Commissioners for Revenue and Customs Act 2005
Relates to	Public Accounts and Charges Act 1891

Status: Repealed

History of passage through Parliament

Records of Parliamentary debate relating to the statute from Hansard

Text of statute as originally enacted

Revised text of statute as amended

The Inland Revenue Regulation Act 1890 (53 & 54 Vict. c. 21) was an act of the Parliament of the United Kingdom that consolidated acts relating to Inland Revenue in the United Kingdom.

== Passage ==
Leave to bring in the Inland Revenue Regulation Bill to the House of Commons was granted to the Financial Secretary to the Treasury, William Jackson MP, the First Lord of the Treasury, W. H. Smith MP, the Chancellor of the Exchequer, George Goschen MP on 28 March 1890. The bill had its first reading in the House of Commons on 28 March 1890, presented by the Financial Secretary to the Treasury, William Jackson MP. The bill had its second reading in the House of Commons on 20 March 1890 and was committed to the Select Committee on the Statute Law Revision Bill, which reported on 6 May 1890, without amendments. The bill was re-committed to a committee of the whole house, which met on 30 June 1890 and reported on 1 July 1890, with amendments. The amended bill had its third reading in the House of Commons on 1 July 1890 and passed, without amendments.

The bill had its first reading in the House of Lords on 3 July 1890. The bill had its second reading in the House of Lords on 10 July 1890 and was committed to a committee of the whole house, which met and reported on 11 July 1890, without amendments. The bill had its third reading in the House of Lords on 14 July 1890 and passed, without amendments.

The bill was granted royal assent on 25 July 1890.

== Subsequent developments ==
Section 28 of the act was repealed by section 2 of, and the schedule to, the Public Authorities Protection Act 1893 (56 & 57 Vict. c. 61), which came into force on 1 January 1894.

Part of section 40 and the whole of section 41 of, and the schedule, to the act were repealed by section 1 of, and the schedule to, the Statute Law Revision Act 1908 (8 Edw. 7. c. 49), which came into force on 21 December 1908.

In section 8 of the act, the words " or on any jury or inquest whatsoever " were repealed by section 64(2) of, and part I of schedule 6 to, the Criminal Justice Act 1972, which came into force on 30 March 1974.

Section 8 of the act was repealed by section 1(1) of, and group 2 of part VII of schedule 1 to, the Statute Law (Repeals) Act 1986, which came into force on 2 May 1986.

The whole act was repealed by section 50(2) of, and schedule 5 to, the Commissioners for Revenue and Customs Act 2005, which came into force on 7 April 2005. The act combined the Inland Revenue and HM Customs and Excise into a single government department, HM Revenue and Customs.

== Repealed enactments ==
Section 40 of the act repealed 29 enactments, listed in the schedule to the act, provided that repeals would not affect all bonds and securities given and all appointments and regulations made under or in pursuance of any enactment repealed.

Citation	Short title	Title	Extent of repeal
11 Geo. 1. c. 30	Adulteration of Tea and Coffee Act 1724	An Act for more effectual preventing frauds and abuses in the public revenues, for preventing frauds in the salt duties, and for giving relief for salt used in the curing of salmon and codfish in the year one thousand seven hundred and nineteen exported from that part of Great Britain called Scotland, for enabling the insurance companies to plead the general issue in actions brought against them, and for securing the stamp duties upon policies of insurance.	Section thirty-two and section thirty-nine, from "or by action" to the end of the section.
8 Geo. 2. c. 32	Stamp Duties Act 1735	An Act for carrying into execution an agreement made between the mayor and commonalty and citizens of the city of London and the wardens and commonalty of the Mystery of Mercers of the said city, and Stamp Brooksbank, Esquire, Secretary to the Commissioners of His Majesty's Revenue of Excise, for the purchase of Gresham College and the ground and buildings thereunto belonging, and for vesting the same absolutely in the Crown for the purpose of erecting and building an excise office there, and for enabling the lecturers of the said college to marry, notwithstanding any restriction contained in the will of Thomas Gresham, Knight, deceased.	Section nine.
26 Geo. 3. c. 77	Excise (No. 5) Act 1786	An Act to limit a time for the repayment of the duties on male servants and carriages by the Commissioners of Excise, and also on horses, waggon, wains, and carts, by the Commissioners of Stamps, and for the amendment of several laws relating to the duties under the management of the Excise.	The whole Act.
42 Geo. 3. c. 56	Medicines Stamp Act 1802	An Act to repeal an Act passed in the twenty-fifth year of the reign of His present Majesty for granting stamp duties on certain medicines and for charging other duties in lieu thereof, and for making effectual provision for the better collection of the said duties.	Section twenty-three, section twenty-five, from "at any time" to "paid and satisfied," from "upon giving" to "affirmed," and from "for the county" to the end of the section, and sections twenty-six, twenty-seven, and thirty.
43 Geo. 3. c. 73	Medicines Stamp Act 1803	An Act to amend an Act passed in the forty-second year of the reign of His present Majesty intitled "An Act to repeal an Act passed in the twenty-fifth year of the reign of His present Majesty for granting stamp duties on certain medicines, and for charging other duties in lieu thereof; and for making effectual provision for the better collection of the said duties."	Section five.
44 Geo. 3. c. 98	Stamp Act 1804	An Act to repeal the several duties under the Commissioners for managing the duties upon stamped vellum, parchment, and paper in Great Britain, and to grant new and additional duties in lieu thereof.	Sections ten and twenty-seven.
7 & 8 Geo. 4. c. 53	Excise Management Act 1827	An Act to consolidate and amend the laws relating to the collection and management of the revenue of excise throughout Great Britain and Ireland.	Sections one and two, section three to "respectively and that," and from "except" to the end of the section, sections four to seven, ten to seventeen, twenty-four, twenty-six, section thirty-two from "and in every such case" to "respectively shall be forfeited," section thirty-three from "Provided always" to the end of the section, sections forty-four to sixty-four, and seventy-two, section seventy-eight from "Provided always" to the end of the section, sections eighty to eighty-two to "such appeal, and," where those words first occur in the section, section eighty-four from "and they" to "such appeal," and sections ninety-three to one hundred and six, and one hundred and twelve to one hundred and twenty-six.
7 & 8 Geo. 4. c. 55	Board of Stamps in Great Britain and Ireland Act 1827	An Act to consolidate the boards of stamps in Great Britain and Ireland.	The whole Act.
1 & 2 W. 4. c. 4	Excise Declarations Act 1831	An Act to abolish certain oaths and affirmations taken and made in the Customs and Excise Department of His Majesty's revenue, and to substitute declarations in lieu thereof.	Section four from after "interfere with" to "respectively or" and section five.
2 & 3 W. 4. c. 16	Excise Permit Act 1832	An Act to consolidate and amend the laws regulating the granting and issuing of permits for the removal of goods under the laws of excise.	Section fourteen.
2 & 3 W. 4. c. 103	Customs and Excise Revenues Audit (Scotland) Act 1832	An Act to provide for the examination of accounts of the customs and excise revenues in Scotland.	The whole Act.
3 & 4 W. 4. c. 13	Public Revenue (Scotland) Act 1833	An Act to provide for the execution of the duties performed by the Barons of the Exchequer in Scotland in relation to the public revenue, and to place the management of the assessed taxes and land tax in Scotland under the Commissioners for the Affairs of Taxes.	Sections five and six.
4 & 5 W. 4. c. 51	Excise Management Act 1834	An Act to amend the laws relating to the collection and management of the revenue of excise.	Sections one to three, thirteen, fourteen, seventeen, twenty-one, twenty-four, twenty-seven, and twenty-nine.
4 & 5 W. 4. c. 60	Land Tax Act 1834	An Act to amend the laws relating to the land and assessed taxes, and to consolidate the boards of stamps and taxes.	Sections eight and nine.
5 & 6 W. 4. c. 20	Stamps and Taxes Act 1835	An Act to consolidate certain duties in the collection of the revenues of stamps and taxes, and to amend the laws relating thereto.	The whole Act.
4 & 5 Vict. c. 20	Excise Management Act 1841	An Act to alter and amend certain laws relating to the collection and management of the duties of excise.	Sections one, three, four, fifteen to twenty-one, twenty-six to twenty-nine, and thirty-two to thirty-four.
12 & 13 Vict. c. 1	Inland Revenue Board Act 1849	An Act to consolidate the boards of excise and stamps and taxes into one board of commissioners of Inland Revenue, and to make provision for the collection of such revenue.	The whole Act, except section sixteen.
15 & 16 Vict. c. 61	Penalties, etc., under Excise Acts 1852	An Act to amend the laws relating to summary proceedings for penalties and forfeitures under the Acts relating to the Excise.	The whole Act.
16 & 17 Vict. c. 59	Stamp Act 1853	An Act to repeal certain stamp duties and to grant others in lieu thereof, to amend the laws relating to stamp duties, and to make perpetual certain stamp duties in Ireland.	Section seventeen.
18 & 19 Vict. c. 78	Inland Revenue Act 1855	An Act to reduce certain duties payable on stage carriages, and to amend the laws relating to stamp duties and to bonds and securities to the Inland Revenue.	Section six.
23 & 24 Vict. c. 113	Excise Act 1860	An Act to grant duties of excise on chicory, and on licences to dealers in sweets or made wines, also to reduce the excise duty on hops and the period of credit allowed for payment of the duty on malt used in distillation, to repeal the exemption from licence duty of persons dealing in foreign wine and spirits in bond, and to amend the laws relating to the excise.	Section forty.
28 & 29 Vict. c. 96	Revenue (No. 2) Act 1865	An Act to amend the laws relating to the Inland Revenue.	Section twenty-five.
31 & 32 Vict. c. 124	Inland Revenue Act 1868	An Act to amend the laws relating to the Inland Revenue.	Sections one and two.
33 & 34 Vict. c. 97	Stamp Act 1870	The Stamp Act, 1870	Sub-section two of section twenty-six.
33 & 34 Vict. c. 98	Stamp Duties Management Act 1870	The Stamp Duties Management Act, 1870.	Section three, and sub-section two of section twenty-six.
43 & 44 Vict. c. 19	Taxes Management Act 1880	The Taxes Management Act, 1880	Sections twelve and fourteen, and section two of section twenty-one.
43 & 44 Vict. c. 20	Inland Revenue Act 1880	The Inland Revenue Act, 1880	Section thirty-one.
43 & 44 Vict. c. 24	Spirits Act 1880	The Spirits Act, 1880	Section one hundred and fifty-one, and sub-section two of section one hundred and fifty-five.
51 & 52 Vict. c. 8	Customs and Inland Revenue Act 1888	The Customs and Inland Revenue Act, 1888.	Section seven.

== Subsequent developments ==
Section 5 of the act was repealed by section 1 of, and part I of the schedule to, the Statute Law (Repeals) Act 1974, which came into force on 27 June 1974. In section 39 of the act, the definitions of " Goods ", " Plaintiff " and " defendant " were repealed by section 1 of, and part II of the schedule to, the 1974 act.

== See also ==
- Statute Law Revision Act
