= Griffith's Valuation =

1868 land survey of Ireland

Griffith's Valuation was a boundary and land valuation survey of Ireland completed in 1868.

== Griffith's background ==
Richard John Griffith started to value land in Scotland, where he spent two years in 1806–1807 valuing terrain through the examination of its soils. He used 'the Scotch system of valuation' and it was a modified version of this that he introduced into Ireland when he assumed the position of Commissioner of Valuation.

== Tasks in Ireland ==
In 1825 Griffith was appointed by the British Government to carry out a boundary survey of Ireland. He was to mark the boundaries of every county, barony, civil parish, and townland in tandem with the first Ordnance Survey of Ireland.

He was also called upon to assist in the preparation of a Parliamentary bill to provide for the general valuation of Ireland. The Valuation of Lands (Ireland) Act 1826 (7 Geo. 4. c. 62) was passed in 1826 and Griffith was appointed Commissioner of Valuation in 1827, but did not start work until 1830 when the new 6-inch Ordnance Survey maps required by the statute became available. The Valuation of Lands (Ireland) Act 1831 (1 & 2 Will. 4. c. 51), the Valuation of Lands (Ireland) Act 1832 (2 & 3 Will. 4. c. 73) and the Valuation (Ireland) Act 1834 (4 & 5 Will. 4. c. 55) further amended the 1826 act.

The Valuation of Lands (Ireland) Act 1836 (6 & 7 Will. 4. c. 84) consolidated enactments related to the valuation of land in Ireland.

Griffith completed the boundary work in 1844. Griffith served as Commissioner until 1868, when he was succeeded by Sir John Ball Greene, who took charge of the ongoing revisions of the valuation on an annual basis. Griffith also served as Chairman of the Board of Works. He conducted two major valuation surveys. First was the townland valuation, which was completed in the 1840s and which took the townland as the geographical unit of valuation. The second and more extensive was the tenement survey which valued individual property separately for the first time and which also valued all buildings in the townland for the first time, whereas only the larger houses, principally those of the gentry, had been valued in the first valuation. The tenement valuations of County Dublin were the first to be published on 5 May 1853 and the last were the valuations of County Armagh on 1 June 1865.

== Contemporary use of and dates of valuation ==
The valuation is a vital document in genealogical research, since in the absence of census records in Ireland before 1901 the valuation records in many ways can act as a substitute. Many of these records were also digitised and made readily available to the public online as part of the Ask about Ireland and Cultural Heritage Project initiative. It is helpful in this to know the precise dates when the individual county components of the survey were completed, as follows:

County	Date of completion of survey
Carlow	28 June 1853
Cork County of the City	9 July 1853
Cork County	20 July 1853
Dublin County	9 July 1853
Kerry	19 July 1853
Kilkenny County	8 July 1853
Kilkenny County of the City	8 July 1853
Limerick County	29 June 1853
Limerick County of the City	29 June 1853
Queen's County	28 June 1853
Tipperary	29 June 1853
Waterford County	5 July 1853
Waterford County of the City	5 July 1853
Dublin County of the City	31 Oct 1854
Kildare	18 July 1854
Wexford	7 July 1854
Wicklow	4 July 1854
King's County	2 July 1855
Longford	6 July 1855
Louth	5 July 1855
Drogheda County of the Town	6 July 1855
Meath	10 July 1855
Westmeath	5 July 1855
Clare	3 July 1856
Galway County of the Town	14 July 1856
Cavan	25 June 1857
Galway County	29 June 1857
Leitrim	6 July 1857
Mayo	13 July 1857
Donegal	6 July 1858
Roscommon	1 July 1858
Sligo	7 July 1858
Londonderry County and City	16 July 1859
Tyrone	13 July 1860
Monaghan	1 July 1861
Antrim	10 July 1862
Carrickfergus County of the Town	10 July 1862
Fermanagh	4 July 1864
Down	12 July 1864
Armagh	1 June 1865
