= Valuation of Lands (Ireland) Act 1836 =

Act of the Parliament of the United Kingdom

- Act of Parliament
- Parliament of the United Kingdom
- Long title: An Act to consolidate and amend the several Acts for the uniform Valuation of Lands and Tenements in Ireland; and to incorporate certain detached Portions of Counties and Baronies with those Counties and Baronies respectively whereto the same may adjoin or wherein the same are locally situate.
- Citation: 6 & 7 Will. 4. c. 84
- Territorial extent: United Kingdom

Dates
- Royal assent: 17 August 1836
- Commencement: 17 August 1836 (Note: The Acts of Parliament (Commencement) Act 1793.)
- Repealed: 16 July 1874
Other legislation
Amends	See § Repealed enactments
Repeals/revokes	See § Repealed enactments
Repealed by	Statute Law Revision Act 1874

Status: Repealed

Text of statute as originally enacted

The Valuation of Lands (Ireland) Act 1836 (6 & 7 Will. 4. c. 84) was an act of the Parliament of the United Kingdom that consolidated enactments related to the uniform valuation of lands and tenements in Ireland. The first nationwide valuation, now known as Griffith's Valuation, was in progress at the time, under the direction of Richard Griffith.

== Provisions ==
=== Repealed enactments ===
Section 1 of the act repealed 4 enactments, listed in that section, save so far as they repealed any other act or part of an act. The repeal did not affect anything already done under the repealed enactments, and any valuation made or in progress under them was to continue as if made under the authority of this act.

Citation	Short title	Description	Extent of repeal
7 Geo. 4. c. 62	Valuation of Lands (Ireland) Act 1826	An Act to make Provision for the uniform Valuation of Lands and Tenements in the several Baronies, Parishes, and other Divisions of Counties in Ireland, for the Purpose of the more equally levying of the Rates and Charges upon such Baronies, Parishes, and Divisions respectively.	The whole act.
1 & 2 Will. 4. c. 51	Valuation of Lands (Ireland) Act 1831	An Act to amend an Act of the Seventh Year of the Reign of His late Majesty King George the Fourth, for making Provision for the uniform Valuation of Lands and Tenements in the several Baronies, Parishes, and other Divisions of Counties in Ireland, for the Purpose of the more equally levying of the Rates and Charges upon the same.	The whole act.
2 & 3 Will. 4. c. 73	Valuation of Lands (Ireland) Act 1832	An Act to amend Two Acts, of the Seventh Year of the Reign of His late Majesty King George the Fourth, and in the First and Second Years of the Reign of His present Majesty, for the uniform Valuation of Lands and Tenements in the several Baronies, Parishes, and other Divisions of Counties in Ireland.	The whole act.
4 & 5 Will. 4. c. 55	Valuation (Ireland) Act 1834	An Act to amend Three Acts, made respectively in the Seventh Year of the Reign of His late Majesty King George the Fourth, and in the First and Second Years and in the Second and Third Years of the Reign of His present Majesty, for the uniform Valuation of Lands and Tenements in the several Baronies, Parishes, and other Divisions of Counties in Ireland; and to provide for the more effectual Levy of Grand Jury Cess.	So much of the act as relates to the uniform valuation of lands and tenements in Ireland.

== Subsequent developments ==
The whole act was repealed by section 1 of, and the schedule to, the Statute Law Revision Act 1874 (37 & 38 Vict. c. 35), which came into force on 16 July 1874.
