= Aliens Act 1826 =

Act of the Parliament of the United Kingdom

- Act of Parliament
- Parliament of the United Kingdom
- Long title: An Act for the Registration of Aliens.
- Citation: 7 Geo. 4. c. 54
- Territorial extent: United Kingdom

Dates
- Royal assent: 26 May 1826
- Commencement: 1 July 1826 (Note: Section 17.)
- Repealed: 1 July 1836
Other legislation
Repealed by	Registration of Aliens Act 1836

Status: Repealed

Text of statute as originally enacted

The Aliens Act 1826 (7 Geo. 4. c. 54), also known as the Registration of Aliens Act 1826, the Aliens Registration Act 1826, the Alien Registration Act, or the Peace Alien Act, was an act of the Parliament of the United Kingdom. It required immigrants to inform the Secretary of State or the Chief Secretary of Ireland of their place of residence twice a year.

== Subsequent developments ==
The whole act was repealed by section 1 of the Registration of Aliens Act 1836 (6 & 7 Will. 4. c. 11), which came into force on 1 July 1836.
