= Liverpool Court of Passage =

The Liverpool Court of Passage was, at the time of its abolition, a local court of record which actively exercised a civil jurisdiction comparable to or greater than that of the county court for the district in which it was situated.

== Constitution and name ==
This court was granted by charters of Charles I and William III (Pat Rol, 2 Car 1, Part XV, No 8), granted 4 July 1626, 7 Will. 3, granted 26 September 1695. The name seems to be derived from the fact that the court was originally intended for causes arising out of the imports and exports passing through. Up to 1853, all proceedings were entitled "in the borough court of Liverpool".

== Jurisdiction ==
The Liverpool Court of Passage had jurisdiction in personal actions to any amount where the defendant or one of the defendants resided or carried on business within the jurisdiction of the court, or by leave of the judge or registrar, when the whole or part of the cause of action arose within such jurisdiction, provided that, except where the whole cause of action arose within the jurisdiction, no action under £20, in which the county court had jurisdiction, could be commenced in this court. The court also had jurisdiction to try all actions of ejectment between landlord and tenant wherein the annual rent of the premises in question did not exceed £100, and where no fine was reserved or made payable.

As to the jurisdiction of this court, see the Liverpool Corporation Act 1921 (11 & 12 Geo. 5. c. lxxiv).

=== Admiralty jurisdiction ===
In 1869 admiralty jurisdiction was conferred on the county court of Lancashire holden at Liverpool, and consequently the Court of Passage acquired admiralty jurisdiction to the like extent. The practice and procedure were regulated by the Rules of 1903, and were similar to those of the High Court.

The Liverpool Court of Passage had an admiralty jurisdiction similar to and coterminus with that of the County Court of Lancashire at Liverpool. An appeal lay from its decisions in admiralty and maritime causes to a divisional court of the Admiralty Division. (Note: In The Emilie Marron [1905] 2 KB 817, it would seem that the appeal was treated as coming from the common law side of the Court of Passage and taken direct to the Court of Appeal, the question of the jurisdiction not having been raised or argued.)

As to the admiralty jurisdiction of this court, see sections 2 to 4 of the Administration of Justice 1956.

== Legislation ==
Liverpool Court of Passage Act 1893 (Note: Section 1.)
- Act of Parliament
- Parliament of the United Kingdom
- Long title: An Act to better define the Jurisdiction and to improve the Procedure of the Court of Passage in the City of Liverpool, and for other purposes connected therewith.
- Citation: 56 & 57 Vict. c. 37
- Territorial extent: United Kingdom

Dates
- Royal assent: 24 August 1893
- Commencement: 24 August 1893 (Note: The Acts of Parliament (Commencement) Act 1793.)
- Repealed: 4 August 1921

Other legislation
- Repealed by: Liverpool Corporation Act 1921

Status: Repealed

Text of statute as originally enacted

Liverpool Court of Passage Act 1896
- Act of Parliament
- Parliament of the United Kingdom
- Long title: An Act to amend the Procedure of the Liverpool Court of Passage.
- Citation: 59 & 60 Vict. c. 21
- Territorial extent: United Kingdom

Dates
- Royal assent: 7 August 1896
- Commencement: 7 August 1896
- Repealed: 4 August 1921

Other legislation
- Repealed by: Liverpool Corporation Act 1921

Status: Repealed

Text of statute as originally enacted

The court was, in 1909, regulated by certain local acts, and also by two public general acts, the Liverpool Court of Passage Act 1893 (56 & 57 Vict. c. 37) and the Liverpool Court of Passage Act 1896 (59 & 60 Vict. c. 21).

Liverpool Court of Passage Act 1834
- Act of Parliament
- Parliament of the United Kingdom
- Long title: An Act for amending the Proceedings and Practice of the Court of Passage of the Borough of Liverpool in the County Palatine of Lancaster.
- Citation: 4 & 5 Will. 4. c. xcii
- Territorial extent: United Kingdom

Dates
- Royal assent: 30 July 1834
- Commencement: 30 July 1834
- Repealed: 4 August 1921

Other legislation
- Amended by: Liverpool Court of Passage Act 1836
- Repealed by: Liverpool Corporation Act 1921
- Relates to: Liverpool Civil Court of Record Act 1838

Status: Repealed

Text of statute as originally enacted

Liverpool Court of Passage Act 1836
- Act of Parliament
- Parliament of the United Kingdom
- Long title: An Act to amend and render more effectual an Act passed in the Fourth and Fifth Year of the Reign of His present Majesty, intituled "An Act for amending the Proceedings and Practice of the Court of Passage of the Borough of Liverpool in the County Palatine of Lancaster"; and to repeal an Act passed in the Twenty-fifth Year of the Reign of His late Majesty King George the Second, intituled "An Act for the more easy and speedy Recovery of Small Debts in the Town and Port of Liverpool and Liberties thereof in the County Palatine of Lancaster;" and to give further Power for the Recovery of Small Debts within the Borough of Liverpool.
- Citation: 6 & 7 Will. 4. c. cxxxv
- Territorial extent: United Kingdom

Dates
- Royal assent: 13 August 1836
- Commencement: 13 August 1836
- Repealed: 4 August 1921

Other legislation
- Amends: Liverpool Court of Passage Act 1834
- Repealed by: Liverpool Corporation Act 1921
- Relates to: Liverpool Civil Court of Record Act 1838

Status: Repealed

Text of statute as originally enacted

Liverpool Civil Court of Record Act 1838
- Act of Parliament
- Parliament of the United Kingdom
- Long title: An Act for amending certain Acts relating to the Civil Court of Record of the Borough of Liverpool, and improving the Proceedings thereof.
- Citation: 1 & 2 Vict. c. xcix
- Territorial extent: United Kingdom

Dates
- Royal assent: 10 August 1838
- Commencement: 10 August 1838
- Repealed: 4 August 1921

Other legislation
- Repealed by: Liverpool Corporation Act 1921
- Relates to: Liverpool Court of Passage Act 1834; Liverpool Court of Passage Act 1836; Liverpool Improvement Act 1837

Status: Repealed

Text of statute as originally enacted

Liverpool Court of Passage Procedure Act 1853
- Act of Parliament
- Parliament of the United Kingdom
- Long title: An Act for amending the Provisions of certain Acts of Parliament relating to the Civil Court of Record of the Borough of Liverpool, and the Process, Practice, and Mode of Pleading the said Court, and for extending the Jurisdiction thereof.
- Citation: 16 & 17 Vict. c. xxi
- Territorial extent: United Kingdom

Dates
- Royal assent: 14 June 1853
- Commencement: 10 August 1853 (Note: Section 2.)
- Repealed: 4 August 1921

Other legislation
- Repealed by: Liverpool Corporation Act 1921

Status: Repealed

Text of statute as originally enacted

The Liverpool Court of Passage Procedure Act 1853 (16 & 17 Vict. c. xxi) is sometimes called the Liverpool Court of Passage Amendment Act 1853.

The act 4 & 5 Will. 4. c. xcii is sometimes called the Liverpool Court of Passage Act 1834. The act 6 & 7 Will. 4. c. cxxxv is sometimes called the Liverpool Court of Passage Act 1836. It is also known as the Liverpool Court of Requests Act 1836 as it also created a separate Liverpool Court of Requests to handle claims for small debts, presided over by a salaried barrister appointed by Liverpool Corporation.

The act 1 & 2 Vict. c. xcix is sometimes called the Liverpool Court of Passage Act 1838.

== Judge ==
A local act of Parliament, the Liverpool Court of Passage Act 1834 (4 & 5 Will. 4. c. xcii), provided for the appointment by the corporation of a barrister of seven years' standing. In 1893 the title of this judicial officer was changed to the "Presiding Judge of the Court of Passage", with the same power, jurisdiction, and authority in regard to causes in the Court of Passage (subject to rules of court) as was possessed by a judge of the High Court sitting in chambers or at nisi prius.

In case of the death, sickness, or unavoidable absence of the presiding judge, the recorder of Liverpool could act in lieu of him.

== Rules and procedure ==
The presiding judge had power, with the concurrence of the authority for the time being empowered to make rules for the Supreme Court, to adopt and apply to the Court of Passage any or all of the Rules of the Supreme Court, with such modifications, if any, as might be thought fit. Such rules were not to be invalid by reason of extending or otherwise affecting the jurisdiction of the Court of Passage. Rules were made and confirmed under this power in 1903 and 1909.

These rules practically assimilated the procedure of the court to that of the King's Bench and Admiralty Divisions of the High Court, except that summary judgment under Ord 14 could not be obtained against a defendant who was a domestic or menial servant, a labourer, a servant in husbandry, a journeyman, an artificer, a handicraftsman, a miner, or any person engaged in manual labour. The rules also contained tables of court fees and of solicitors' costs, and a scale of allowances to witnesses.

The procedure of this court was amended by the Liverpool Court of Passage Act 1893 (56 & 57 Vict. c. 37) and the Liverpool Court of Passage Act 1896 (59 & 60 Vict. c. 21).

== Removal of actions ==
Actions or matters could be removed from the Court of Passage by writ of certiorari or otherwise, if the High Court or a judge thereof deemed it desirable, upon such terms as to payment of costs, giving security, or otherwise as the High Court or a judge thereof thought fit to impose. There was a power to remit actions of tort commenced in the High Court to the Court of Passage when the plaintiff had no visible means of paying the defendant's costs, and the plaintiff failed to give security for such costs, or to satisfy a judge of the High Court that his action was fit to be prosecuted in the High Court.

Actions of contract commenced in the High Court where the amount in dispute did not exceed £100 could be remitted to the Court of Passage in a similar manner as it might have been remitted to the county court. Actions of contract commenced in the Court of Passage where the amount in dispute was less than £10 could be similarly transferred to the county court. An appeal upon any issue tried in the Court of Passage was allowed under the same circumstances and rules as in the case of a trial at nisi prius.

== Officers ==
There was a registrar and a deputy registrar of the court, who had to be either practising barristers or practising solicitors of five years' standing. They were appointed by, and held their office during the pleasure of, the city council. They had the powers (subject to rules of court) of a registrar, district registrar, master, taxing officer, and associate of the High Court. There was an appeal from all orders, decisions and directions of the registrar and the presiding judge.

The officer of the court was the sergeant-at-mace.

== Statistics ==
This court was still in full operation in 1909. 3,325 plaints were issued in 1905, of which 119 came on for trial.

== Abolition ==
The Liverpool Court of Passage was abolished by section 43(1)(b) of the Courts Act 1971.

Offices

Any judicial or other office in the Liverpool Court of Passage was abolished by section 44(1)(b) of the Courts Act 1971.

Section 44(2) conferred a power to make regulations to provide for the compensation of persons who suffered loss of employment or loss or diminution of emoluments attributable to the effect of section 44(1)(b) or to the abolition of the Liverpool Court of Passage.

Transitional provisions

Transitional provisions were made by section 43(2) of, and Part III of Schedule 5 to the Courts Act 1971.

== Public records ==
Records of the Liverpool Court of Passage are public records within the meaning of the Public Records Act 1958.

== See also ==
- Liverpool
