= List of acts of the Parliament of the United Kingdom from 1836 =

This is a complete list of acts of the Parliament of the United Kingdom for the year 1836.

Note that the first parliament of the United Kingdom was held in 1801; parliaments between 1707 and 1800 were either parliaments of Great Britain or of Ireland). For acts passed up until 1707, see the list of acts of the Parliament of England and the list of acts of the Parliament of Scotland. For acts passed from 1707 to 1800, see the list of acts of the Parliament of Great Britain. See also the list of acts of the Parliament of Ireland.

For acts of the devolved parliaments and assemblies in the United Kingdom, see the list of acts of the Scottish Parliament, the list of acts of the Northern Ireland Assembly, and the list of acts and measures of Senedd Cymru; see also the list of acts of the Parliament of Northern Ireland.

The number shown after each act's title is its chapter number. Acts passed before 1963 are cited using this number, preceded by the year(s) of the reign during which the relevant parliamentary session was held; thus the Union with Ireland Act 1800 is cited as "39 & 40 Geo. 3 c. 67", meaning the 67th act passed during the session that started in the 39th year of the reign of George III and which finished in the 40th year of that reign. Note that the modern convention is to use Arabic numerals in citations (thus "41 Geo. 3" rather than "41 Geo. III"). Acts of the last session of the Parliament of Great Britain and the first session of the Parliament of the United Kingdom are both cited as "41 Geo. 3". Acts passed from 1963 onwards are simply cited by calendar year and chapter number.

All modern acts have a short title, e.g. the Local Government Act 2003. Some earlier acts also have a short title given to them by later acts, such as by the Short Titles Act 1896.

== 6 & 7 Will. 4 ==
The second session of the 12th Parliament of the United Kingdom, which met from 4 February 1836 until 20 August 1836.

This session was also traditionally cited as 6 & 7 Gul. 4, 6 & 7 Wm. 4 or 6 & 7 W. 4.

=== Public general acts ===
Short title	Citation	Royal assent
Long title
Supply Act 1836 (repealed)	6 & 7 Will. 4. c. 1	4 March 1836
An Act to apply certain Sums to the Service of the Year One thousand eight hundred and thirty-six—seven. (Repealed by Statute Law Revision Act 1874 (37 & 38 Vict. c. 35))
Exchequer Bills Act 1836 (repealed)	6 & 7 Will. 4. c. 2	4 March 1836
An Act for raising the Sum of Fifteen Millions by Exchequer Bills, for the Service of the Year One thousand eight hundred and thirty-six—seven. (Repealed by Statute Law Revision Act 1874 (37 & 38 Vict. c. 35))
Forest of Dean Act 1836 or the Constable of St. Briavels Act 1836 (repealed)	6 & 7 Will. 4. c. 3	4 March 1836
An Act for vesting the office of constable of the castle of St. Briavel's in the First Commissioner of His Majesty’s Woods, Forests, Land Revenues, Works and Buildings; and for vesting the office of keeper of the forest of Dean in the county of Gloucester in the Commissioners of His Majesty's Woods, Forests, Land Revenues, Works and Buildings. (Repealed by Wild Creatures and Forest Laws Act 1971 (c. 47))
Capital Punishment Abolition Act 1836 (repealed)	6 & 7 Will. 4. c. 4	18 March 1836
An Act to amend an Act of the last Session (Note: Capital Punishment Abolition Act 1835 (5 & 6 Will. 4. c. 81)) for abolishing Capital Punishments in Cases of Letter Stealing and Sacrilege. (Repealed by Statute Law Revision Act 1874 (37 & 38 Vict. c. 35))
Abolition of Slavery Act 1836 (repealed)	6 & 7 Will. 4. c. 5	18 March 1836
An Act for carrying into further Execution Two Acts of His present Majesty, relating to the Compensation for Slaves upon the Abolition of Slavery, and for facilitating the Distribution and Payment of such Compensation. (Repealed by Court of Chancery (Funds) Act 1872 (35 & 36 Vict. c. 44))
Slave Trade Suppression (Treaty with Spain) Act 1836 (repealed)	6 & 7 Will. 4. c. 6	30 March 1836
An Act for carrying into effect a Treaty made between His Majesty and the Queen Regent of Spain for the Abolition of the Slave Trade. (Repealed by Slave Trade Act 1873 (36 & 37 Vict. c. 88))
Indemnity Act 1836 (repealed)	6 & 7 Will. 4. c. 7	30 March 1836
An Act to indemnify such Persons in the United Kingdom as have omitted to qualify themselves for Offices and Employments, and for extending the Time limited for those Purposes respectively until the Twenty-fifth Day of March One thousand eight hundred and thirty-seven; to permit such Persons in Great Britain as have omitted to make and file Affidavits of the Execution of Indentures of Clerks to Attornies and Solicitors to make and file the same on or before the First Day of Hilary Term One thousand eight hundred and thirty-seven; and to allow Persons to make and file such Affidavits, although the Persons whom they served shall have neglected to take out their Annual Certificates. (Repealed by Promissory Oaths Act 1871 (34 & 35 Vict. c. 48))
Mutiny Act 1836 (repealed)	6 & 7 Will. 4. c. 8	22 April 1836
An Act for punishing Mutiny and Desertion, and for the better Payment of the Army and their Quarters. (Repealed by Statute Law Revision Act 1874 (37 & 38 Vict. c. 35))
Marine Mutiny Act 1836 (repealed)	6 & 7 Will. 4. c. 9	22 April 1836
An Act for the Regulation of His Majesty's Royal Marine Forces while on Shore. (Repealed by Statute Law Revision Act 1874 (37 & 38 Vict. c. 35))
Stafford Election Act 1836 (repealed)	6 & 7 Will. 4. c. 10	19 May 1836
An Act to indemnify Witnesses who may give Evidence before the Lords Spiritual and Temporal on a Bill to exclude the Borough of Stafford from sending Burgesses to serve in Parliament. (Repealed by Statute Law Revision Act 1874 (37 & 38 Vict. c. 35))
Registration of Aliens Act 1836 (repealed)	6 & 7 Will. 4. c. 11	19 May 1836
An Act for the Registration of Aliens, and to repeal an Act passed in the Seventh Year of the Reign of His late Majesty (Note: Aliens Act 1826 (7 Geo. 4. c. 54)) for that Purpose. (Repealed by Aliens Act 1905 (5 Edw. 7. c. 13))
Petty Sessional Divisions Act 1836 (repealed)	6 & 7 Will. 4. c. 12	20 May 1836
An Act for amending an Act of the Ninth Year of the Reign of His late Majesty King George the Fourth, intituled "An Act for the better Regulation of Divisions in the several Counties of England and Wales." (Note: Division of Counties Act 1828 (9 Geo. 4. c. 43)) (Repealed by Justices of the Peace Act 1949 (12, 13 & 14 Geo. 6. c. 101))
Constabulary (Ireland) Act 1836 (repealed)	6 & 7 Will. 4. c. 13	20 May 1836
An Act to consolidate the Laws relating to the Constabulary Force in Ireland. (Repealed by Police (Northern Ireland) Act 1998 (c. 32))
Bankruptcy (Ireland) Act 1836 (repealed)	6 & 7 Will. 4. c. 14	20 May 1836
An Act to amend the Laws relating to Bankrupts in Ireland. (Repealed by Irish Bankrupt and Insolvent Act 1857 (20 & 21 Vict. c. 60))
Seamen Act 1836 (repealed)	6 & 7 Will. 4. c. 15	7 June 1836
An Act to amend an Act of the Fourth and Fifth Years of His present Majesty, (Note: Merchant Seaman's Widows, etc. Act 1834 (4 & 5 Will. 4. c. 52)) in order to enable certain Seamen belonging to Shetland or Orkney to pay certain Sums of Money, payable under that Act to the Seamen's Fund, at Lerwick in Shetland or Kirkwall in Orkney. (Repealed by Statute Law Revision Act 1874 (37 & 38 Vict. c. 35))
Abolition of Slavery Act 1836 (repealed)	6 & 7 Will. 4. c. 16	7 June 1836
An Act to revive and continue in force, until the First Day of August One thousand eight hundred and forty, an Act of the Legislature of Jamaica to explain and amend an Act (Note: Slavery Abolition Act 1833 (3 & 4 Will. 4. c. 73)) for the Abolition of Slavery in that Island, and in aid of the same. (Repealed by Statute Law Revision Act 1874 (37 & 38 Vict. c. 35))
Administration of Justice, West Indies Act 1836 (repealed)	6 & 7 Will. 4. c. 17	7 June 1836
An Act to make Provision for the better Administration of Justice in certain of His Majesty's West India Colonies. (Repealed by Statute Law Revision Act 1874 (37 & 38 Vict. c. 35))
Supply Act 1836 (repealed)	6 & 7 Will. 4. c. 18	7 June 1836
An Act to apply the Sum of Eight Millions, out of the Consolidated Fund, to the Service of the Year One thousand eight hundred and thirty-six. (Repealed by Statute Law Revision Act 1874 (37 & 38 Vict. c. 35))
Durham (County Palatine) Act 1836 (repealed)	6 & 7 Will. 4. c. 19	21 June 1836
An Act for separating the Palatine Jurisdiction of the County Palatine of Durham for the Bishoprick of Durham. (Repealed by Statute Law (Repeals) Act 1976 (c. 16))
Ecclesiastical Leases Act 1836 (repealed)	6 & 7 Will. 4. c. 20	21 June 1836
An Act for imposing certain Restrictions on the Renewal of Leases by Ecclesiastical Persons. (Repealed by Statute Law (Repeals) Measure 2018 (No. 1))
Letter Stealing (Scotland) Act 1836 (repealed)	6 & 7 Will. 4. c. 21	21 June 1836
An Act to provide that Persons in Scotland accused of Letter Stealing shall not be entitled to Liberation on Ball unless in certain Cases. (Repealed by Post Office (Repeal of Laws) Act 1837 (7 Will. 4 & 1 Vict. c. 32))
Bastards (Scotland) Act 1836 (repealed)	6 & 7 Will. 4. c. 22	21 June 1836
An Act to enable Bastards in Scotland to make Testaments. (Repealed by Law Reform (Parent and Child) (Scotland) Act 1986 (c. 9))
Insolvent Debtors (Ireland) Act 1836 (repealed)	6 & 7 Will. 4. c. 23	21 June 1836
An Act to continue for Three Years, and from thence to the End of the then next Session of Parliament, the Acts for the Relief of Insolvent Debtors in Ireland. (Repealed by Statute Law Revision Act 1874 (37 & 38 Vict. c. 35))
Marriages in St. Anne's Chapel, Wandsworth Act 1836 (repealed)	6 & 7 Will. 4. c. 24	21 June 1836
An Act to render valid certain Marriages solemnized in a Chapel of Ease, in the Parish of Wandsworth in the County of Surrey, called Saint Ann's Chapel. (Repealed by Statute Law (Repeals) Act 1977 (c. 18))
Postage Act 1836 (repealed)	6 & 7 Will. 4. c. 25	21 June 1836
An Act for granting an additional Rate of Postage on Letters between Great Britain and Ireland by way of Milford and Waterford. (Repealed by Statute Law Revision Act 1861 (24 & 25 Vict. c. 101))
Sugar Duties Act 1836 (repealed)	6 & 7 Will. 4. c. 26	4 July 1836
An Act for granting to His Majesty, until the Fifth Day of July One thousand eight hundred and thirty-seven, certain Duties on Sugar imported into the United Kingdom, for the Service of the Year One thousand eight hundred and thirty-six. (Repealed by Statute Law Revision Act 1861 (24 & 25 Vict. c. 101))
Bankruptcy Act 1836 (repealed)	6 & 7 Will. 4. c. 27	4 July 1836
An Act for investing in Government Securities further Portions of the Cash lying unemployed in the Bank of England belonging to Bankrupts Estates. (Repealed by Bankruptcy Repeal and Insolvent Court Act 1869 (32 & 33 Vict. c. 83))
Government Offices Security Act 1836 (repealed)	6 & 7 Will. 4. c. 28	4 July 1836
An Act to enable Persons to make Deposits of Stock or Exchequer Bills in lieu of giving Security by Bond to the Postmaster General, and Commissioners of Land Revenue, Customs, Excise, Stamps, and Taxes. (Repealed by Statute Law (Repeals) Act 1974 (c. 22))
Dublin Police Act 1836 (repealed)	6 & 7 Will. 4. c. 29	4 July 1836
An Act for improving the Police in the District of Dublin Metropolis. (Repealed by Statute Law (Repeals) Act 2013 (c. 2))
Executions for Murder Act 1836 (repealed)	6 & 7 Will. 4. c. 30	14 July 1836
An Act to repeal so much of Two Acts of the Ninth and Tenth Years of King George the Fourth (Note: Offences Against the Person Act 1828 (9 Geo. 4. c. 31)) (Note: Offences Against the Person (Ireland) Act 1829 (10 Geo. 4. c. 34)) as directs the Period of the Execution and the Prison Discipline of Persons convicted of the Crime of Murder. (Repealed by Criminal Statutes Repeal Act 1861 (24 & 25 Vict. c. 95))
Chapels of Ease (Ireland) Act 1836 (repealed)	6 & 7 Will. 4. c. 31	14 July 1836
An Act to amend an Act of His late Majesty King George the Second, (Note: Ecclesiastical Benefices and Woods Act 1727 (1 Geo. 2. c. 18 (I))) for the Encouragement of building of Chapels of Ease in Ireland. (Repealed by Church of Ireland Acts Repeal Act 1851 (14 & 15 Vict. c. 71))
Benefit Building Societies Act 1836 (repealed)	6 & 7 Will. 4. c. 32	14 July 1836
An Act for the Regulation of Benefit Building Societies. (Repealed by Building Societies Act 1874 (37 & 38 Vict. c. 42))
Erasures in Deeds (Scotland) Act 1836 (repealed)	6 & 7 Will. 4. c. 33	14 July 1836
An Act to amend and regulate the law of Scotland as to erasures in instruments of sasine and of resignation ad remanentiam. (Repealed by Abolition of Feudal Tenure etc. (Scotland) Act 2000 (asp 5))
Officers of Clerks of the Crown and Clerks of the Peace (Ireland) Act 1836 (repealed)	6 & 7 Will. 4. c. 34	14 July 1836
An Act to amend an Act passed in the Seventh and Eighth Years of the Reign of His Majesty King George the Fourth (Note: Petty Sessions (Ireland) Act 1827 (7 & 8 Geo. 4. c. 67)) for the better Administration of Justice at the holding of Petty Sessions by Justices of the Peace in Ireland. (Repealed by Statute Law Revision Act 1874 (37 & 38 Vict. c. 35) and County Officers and Courts (Ireland) Act 1877 (40 & 41 Vict. c. 56))
Holyhead Road Act 1836 or the London and Holyhead Road Act 1836 (repealed)	6 & 7 Will. 4. c. 35	14 July 1836
An Act for further improving the Road between London and Holyhead, by Coventry, Birmingham, and Shrewsbury. (Repealed by Statute Law (Repeals) Act 2013 (c. 2))
Constabulary (Ireland) Act 1836 (No. 2) or the Constabulary (Ireland) (No. 2) Act 1836 (repealed)	6 & 7 Will. 4. c. 36	28 July 1836
An Act to amend an Act passed in the present Session of Parliament, (Note: Constabulary (Ireland) Act 1836 (6 & 7 Will. 4. c. 13)) for consolidating the Laws relating to the Constabulary Force in Ireland. (Repealed by Constabulary (Ireland) Act 1846 (9 & 10 Vict. c. 97) and Statute Law Revision Act (Northern Ireland) 1954 (c. 35 (N.I.)))
Bread Act 1836 (repealed)	6 & 7 Will. 4. c. 37	28 July 1836
An Act to repeal the several Acts now in force relating to Bread to be sold out of the City of London and the Liberties thereof and beyond the Weekly Bills of Mortality and Ten Miles of the Royal Exchange; and to provide other Regulations for the making and Sale of Bread, and for preventing the Adulteration of Meal, Flour, and Bread, beyond the Limits aforesaid. (Repealed by Food and Drugs Act 1938 (1 & 2 Geo. 6. c. 56))
Licensing (Ireland) Act 1836 (repealed)	6 & 7 Will. 4. c. 38	28 July 1836
An Act to amend an Act passed in the Third and Fourth Years of the Reign of His present Majesty, intituled "An Act to amend the Laws relating to Excise Licences, and to the Sale of Wine, Spirits, Beer, and Cider, by Retail, in Ireland." (Repealed for Northern Ireland by Licensing Act (Northern Ireland) 1971 (c. 13 (N.I.)))
Arms and Gunpowder (Ireland) Act 1836 (repealed)	6 & 7 Will. 4. c. 39	28 July 1836
An Act to continue for One Year, and from thence to the End of the then next Session of Parliament, the several Acts relating to the Importation and keeping of Arms and Gunpowder in Ireland. (Repealed by Statute Law Revision Act 1874 (37 & 38 Vict. c. 35))
Turnpike Acts, Ireland, Continuance Act 1836 (repealed)	6 & 7 Will. 4. c. 40	28 July 1836
An Act to continue for One Year, and from thence to the End of the then next Session of Parliament, the several Acts for regulating the Turnpike Roads in Ireland. (Repealed by Statute Law Revision Act 1874 (37 & 38 Vict. c. 35))
Commissary Court of Edinburgh, etc. Act 1836 (repealed)	6 & 7 Will. 4. c. 41	28 July 1836
An Act to abolish the Commissary Court of Edinburgh, and to regulate the Mode of taking Proofs in Consistorial Causes in Scotland. (Repealed by Statute Law Revision Act 1891 (54 & 55 Vict. c. 67))
Entail Powers Act 1836 (repealed)	6 & 7 Will. 4. c. 42	28 July 1836
An Act to grant certain powers to heirs of entail in Scotland, and to authorize the sale of entailed lands for the payment of certain debts affecting the same. (Repealed by Abolition of Feudal Tenure etc. (Scotland) Act 2000 (asp 5))
Judicial Ratifications (Scotland) Act 1836 (repealed)	6 & 7 Will. 4. c. 43	28 July 1836
An Act to provide for the taking of Judicial Ratifications of Scottish Deeds on Oath as heretofore. (Repealed by Statute Law (Repeals) Act 1978 (c. 45))
Insolvent Debtors (England) Act 1836 (repealed)	6 & 7 Will. 4. c. 44	28 July 1836
An Act to continue the Laws for the Relief of Insolvent Debtors in England until the First Day of June One thousand eight hundred and thirty-seven, and from thence to the End of the then next Session of Parliament. (Repealed by Statute Law Revision Act 1874 (37 & 38 Vict. c. 35))
Stamps and Excise Act 1836 (repealed)	6 & 7 Will. 4. c. 45	28 July 1836
An Act to transfer the Collection and Management of the Duties in Great Britain on Horses let for Hire, and on Licences relating to the same, from the Commissioners of Stamps and Taxes to the Commissioners of Excise. (Repealed by Revenue Act 1869 (32 & 33 Vict. c. 14))
New South Wales, etc. Act 1836 (repealed)	6 & 7 Will. 4. c. 46	28 July 1836
An Act to continue until the Thirty-first Day of December One thousand eight hundred and thirty-seven, and from thence to the End of the then next Session of Parliament, an Act of the Ninth Year of His late Majesty, (Note: Australian Courts Act 1828 (9 Geo. 4. c. 83)) for the Administration of Justice in New South Wales and Van Diemen's Land. (Repealed by Statute Law Revision Act 1874 (37 & 38 Vict. c. 35))
Insolvent Debtors, East Indies Act 1836 (repealed)	6 & 7 Will. 4. c. 47	28 July 1836
An Act to continue until the First Day of March One thousand eight hundred and thirty-nine, and from thence to the End of the then next Session of Parliament, the several Acts relating to insolvent Debtors in India. (Repealed by Statute Law Revision Act 1874 (37 & 38 Vict. c. 35))
Indemnity to Certain Governors Act 1836 (repealed)	6 & 7 Will. 4. c. 48	28 July 1836
An Act to indemnify the Governors and others of the Islands of Antigua, Saint Christopher, Nevis, and Montserrat for having permitted the Importation of certain Articles Duty-free. (Repealed by Statute Law Revision Act 1874 (37 & 38 Vict. c. 35))
Demise of Parts of Rolls Estate Act 1836 (repealed)	6 & 7 Will. 4. c. 49	28 July 1836
An Act to enable the Master of the Rolls to demise Part of the Rolls Estate to the Society of Judges and Serjeants. (Repealed by Crown Estate Act 1961 (9 & 10 Eliz. 2. c. 55))
Horse Patrol, Metropolis Act 1836 (repealed)	6 & 7 Will. 4. c. 50	13 August 1836
An Act to authorize the placing of the Horse Patrol now acting under the Authority of the Chief Magistrate of the Public Office in Bow Street under the Authority of the Justices appointed for the Metropolitan Police District. (Repealed by Metropolitan Police Act 1839 (2 & 3 Vict. c. 47))
Richmond Penitentiary, etc. Act 1836 (repealed)	6 & 7 Will. 4. c. 51	13 August 1836
An Act for converting the Richmond General Penitentiary into one of the Prisons for the County of the City of Dublin, and to amend the Law relating to Prisons in Ireland. (Repealed by Statute Law Revision (No. 2) Act 1888 (51 & 52 Vict. c. 57))
Excise Act 1836 (repealed)	6 & 7 Will. 4. c. 52	13 August 1836
An Act to repeal the Duties and Drawbacks of Excise on Paper printed, painted, or stained in the United Kingdom; and to reduce the Duties, Allowances, and Drawbacks on Paper, Button-board, Mill-board, Pasteboard, and Scale-board, made in the United Kingdom, of the First Class; and to discontinue the Excise Survey on the Manufacturers of certain Articles made from Paper, and on Dealers in and Retailers of Vinegar. (Repealed by Statute Law Revision Act 1874 (37 & 38 Vict. c. 35))
Prince of Wales Island Act 1836 (repealed)	6 & 7 Will. 4. c. 53	13 August 1836
An Act for enabling His Majesty to grant Admiralty Jurisdiction to the Court of Judicature of Prince of Wales's Island, Singapore, and Malacca. (Repealed by Statute Law Revision Act 1874 (37 & 38 Vict. c. 35))
Post Office (Newspapers) Act 1836 (repealed)	6 & 7 Will. 4. c. 54	13 August 1836
An Act to consolidate and amend the Laws relating to the Conveyance of Newspapers by the Post. (Repealed by Post Office (Repeal of Laws) Act 1837 (7 Will. 4 & 1 Vict. c. 32))
Loan Societies (Ireland) Act 1836 (repealed)	6 & 7 Will. 4. c. 55	13 August 1836
An Act to amend the Laws relating to Loan Societies in Ireland. (Repealed by Charitable Loan Societies (Ireland) Act 1843 (6 & 7 Vict. c. 91))
Cessio (Scotland) Act 1836 (repealed)	6 & 7 Will. 4. c. 56	13 August 1836
An Act for regulating the Process of Cessio bonorum in the Court of Session, and for extending the Jurisdiction of Sheriff in Scotland to such Cases. (Repealed by Bankruptcy (Scotland) Act 1913 (3 & 4 Geo. 5. c. 20))
Offences near Cape of Good Hope Act 1836 (repealed)	6 & 7 Will. 4. c. 57	13 August 1836
An Act for the Prevention and Punishment of Offences committed by His Majesty's Subjects within certain Territories adjacent to the Colony of the Cape of Good Hope. (Repealed by South Africa Offences Act 1863 (26 & 27 Vict. c. 35))
Bills of Exchange Act 1836 (repealed)	6 & 7 Will. 4. c. 58	13 August 1836
An Act for declaring the law as to the Day on which it is requisite to present for Payment to the Acceptors or Acceptor supra Protest for Honour, or to the Referees or Referee in case of Need, Bills of Exchange, which had been dishonoured. (Repealed by Bills of Exchange Act 1882 (45 & 46 Vict. c. 61))
Prints and Engravings Copyright (Ireland) Act 1836 (repealed)	6 & 7 Will. 4. c. 59	13 August 1836
An Act to extend the Protection of Copyright in Prints and Engravings to Ireland. (Repealed by Copyright Act 1911 (1 & 2 Geo. 5. c. 46))
Customs Act 1836 (repealed)	6 & 7 Will. 4. c. 60	13 August 1836
An Act to amend the Laws relating to the Customs. (Repealed by Customs (Repeal) Act 1845 (8 & 9 Vict. c. 84))
Shipowners' Liability for Losses by Fire Act 1836 (repealed)	6 & 7 Will. 4. c. 61	13 August 1836
An Act to assimilate the Law of Ireland to that of England in respect to the Liability of Owners of Vessels For Losses by Fire. (Repealed by Statute Law Revision Act 1861 (24 & 25 Vict. c. 101))
Turnpike Acts Continuance Act 1836 (repealed)	6 & 7 Will. 4. c. 62	13 August 1836
An Act for continuing, until the First Day of June One thousand eight hundred and thirty-eight, the several Acts for regulating the Turnpike Roads, in Great Britain which will expire with the present or the next Session of Parliament. (Repealed by Statute Law Revision Act 1874 (37 & 38 Vict. c. 35))
Highway Rates Act 1836 (repealed)	6 & 7 Will. 4. c. 63	13 August 1836
An Act to facilitate, until the Nineteenth Day of March One thousand eight hundred and thirty-seven, the Recovery of certain Arrears of Highway Rates and Composition in lieu of Statute Duty. (Repealed by Statute Law Revision Act 1874 (37 & 38 Vict. c. 35))
Ecclesiastical Leases (Amendment) Act 1836 (repealed)	6 & 7 Will. 4. c. 64	13 August 1836
An Act to explain and amend an Act passed in this present Session of Parliament (Note: Ecclesiastical Leases Act 1836 (6 & 7 Will. 4. c. 20)) for imposing certain Restrictions on the Renewal of Leases by Ecclesiastical Persons. (Repealed by Statute Law (Repeals) Measure 2018 (No. 1))
Game Laws (England) Local Taxes, etc. (Scotland) Act 1836 (repealed)	6 & 7 Will. 4. c. 65	13 August 1836
An Act for granting Relief from the Duties of Assessed Taxes, and on Stage Carriages, in certain Cases, and to regulate the charging of the Duty payable for taking or killing game, in Great Britain; and to provide for the Collection of certain Local Taxes in Scotland. (Repealed by Statute Law Revision (No. 2) Act 1888 (51 & 52 Vict. c. 57))
Lotteries Act 1836 (repealed)	6 & 7 Will. 4. c. 66	13 August 1836
An Act to prevent the advertising of Foreign and other illegal Lotteries. (Repealed by Betting and Lotteries Act 1934 (24 & 25 Geo. 5. c. 58) and Betting and Lotteries Act (Northern Ireland) 1957 (c. 19 (N.I.)))
Ecclesiastical Appointments Suspension Act 1836 (repealed)	6 & 7 Will. 4. c. 67	13 August 1836
An Act for suspending for One Year Appointments to certain Dignities and Offices in Cathedral and Collegiate Churches, and to Sinecure Rectories. (Repealed by Statute Law Revision Act 1874 (37 & 38 Vict. c. 35))
Western Australia Government Act 1836 (repealed)	6 & 7 Will. 4. c. 68	13 August 1836
An Act to continue until the Thirty-first Pay of December One thousand eight hundred and thirty-eighty and from thence to the End of the then next Session of Parliament an Act of the Tenth Year of His late Majesty, (Note: Government of Western Australia Act 1829 (10 Geo. 4. c. 22)) for providing for the Government of His Majesty's Settlements in Western Australia, on the Western Coast of New Australia. (Repealed by Statute Law Revision Act 1874 (37 & 38 Vict. c. 35))
Plate (Scotland) Act 1836 (repealed)	6 & 7 Will. 4. c. 69	13 August 1836
An Act to fix the Standard Qualities of Gold and Silver Plate in Scotland, and to provide for the assaying and marking thereof. (Repealed by Hallmarking Act 1973 (c. 43))
Sites for Schoolrooms Act 1836 (repealed)	6 & 7 Will. 4. c. 70	13 August 1836
An Act to facilitate the Conveyance of Sites for School Rooms. (Repealed by School Sites Act 1841 (4 & 5 Vict. c. 38))
Tithe Act 1836 or the Tithe Commutation Act 1836	6 & 7 Will. 4. c. 71	13 August 1836
An Act for the commutation of tithes in England and Wales.
Countervailing Duties on Spirit Mixtures, etc. Act 1836 (repealed)	6 & 7 Will. 4. c. 72	13 August 1836
An Act to impose countervailing Duties of Excise on Mixtures, Compounds, Preparations, and Commodities made from or with Spirits removed from Ireland to England or Scotland, or from Scotland to England, and to grant countervailing Drawbacks on the Removal of the same; to repeal the additional Duties of Excise on Licences to Retailers of Spirits in the United Kingdom; and to alter the Laws relating to Distillers and Retailers of Spirits. (Repealed by Statute Law Revision Act 1874 (37 & 38 Vict. c. 35))
Court of Exchequer (Scotland) Act 1836 (repealed)	6 & 7 Will. 4. c. 73	13 August 1836
An Act to continue until the First Day of July next, and from thence to the End of the then next Session of Parliament, an Act passed in the Fifth and Sixth Years of His present Majesty, (Note: Exchequer Court (Scotland) Act 1835 (5 & 6 Will. 4. c. 46)) relating to the Dispatch of Business done by the Court of Exchequer in Scotland. (Repealed by Statute Law Revision Act 1874 (37 & 38 Vict. c. 35))
Court of Chancery (Ireland) Act 1836 (repealed)	6 & 7 Will. 4. c. 74	13 August 1836
An Act to abolish certain Offices connected with the Court of Chancery in Ireland, and to provide for the Performance of the Duties thereof. (Repealed by Judicature (Northern Ireland) Act 1978 (c. 23))
Civil Bill Courts (Ireland) Act 1836 (repealed)	6 & 7 Will. 4. c. 75	13 August 1836
An Act to extend the Jurisdiction and regulate the Proceedings of the Civil Bill Courts in Ireland. (Repealed by Civil Bill Courts (Ireland) Act 1851 (14 & 15 Vict. c. 57))
Stamp Duties on Newspapers Act 1836 (repealed)	6 & 7 Will. 4. c. 76	13 August 1836
An Act to reduce the Duties on Newspapers, and to amend the Laws relating to the Duties on Newspapers and Advertisements. (Repealed by Inland Revenue Repeal Act 1870 (33 & 34 Vict. c. 99))
Ecclesiastical Commissioners Act 1836 (repealed)	6 & 7 Will. 4. c. 77	13 August 1836
An Act for carrying into Effect the Reports of the Commissioners appointed to consider the State of the Established Church in England and Wales, with reference to Ecclesiastical Duties and Revenues, so far as they relate to Episcopal Dioceses, Revenues, and Patronage. (Repealed by Statute Law (Repeals) Measure 2018 (No. 1))
Consuls in Ottoman Dominions Act 1836 (repealed)	6 & 7 Will. 4. c. 78	13 August 1836
An Act to enable His Majesty to make Regulations for the better defining and establishing the Powers and Jurisdiction of His Majesty's Consuls in the Ottoman Dominions. (Repealed by Foreign Jurisdiction Act 1843 (6 & 7 Vict. c. 94))
Lighthouses Act 1836 (repealed)	6 & 7 Will. 4. c. 79	13 August 1836
An Act for vesting Lighthouses, Lights, and Sea Marks on the Coasts of England in the Corporation of Trinity House of Deptford Strond; and for making Provisions respecting Lighthouses, Lights, Buoys, Beacons, and Sea Marks, and the Tolls and Duties payable in respect thereof. (Repealed by Statute Law Revision Act 1874 (37 & 38 Vict. c. 35))
Land Tax Commissioners (Appointment) Act 1836 (repealed)	6 & 7 Will. 4. c. 80	13 August 1836
An Act to appoint additional Commissioners for executing the Acts for granting ad Aid by a Land Tax, and for continuing the Duties on Personal Estates, Offices, and Pensions. (Repealed by Statute Law Revision Act 1950 (14 Geo. 6. c. 6))
Slave Trade Act 1836 (repealed)	6 & 7 Will. 4. c. 81	17 August 1836
An Act to authorize His Majesty, until Six Months after the Commencement of the next Session of Parliament, to carry into immediate Execution, by Orders in Council, any Treaties, Conventions, or Stipulations made with any Foreign Power of State for the Suppression of the Slave Trade. (Repealed by Slave Trade Act 1873 (36 & 37 Vict. c. 88))
Abolition of Slavery Act 1836 (repealed)	6 & 7 Will. 4. c. 82	17 August 1836
An Act to carry into further Execution an Act for compensating Owners of Slaves upon the Abolition of Slavery, and for completing the full Payment of such Compensation. (Repealed by Court of Chancery (Funds) Act 1872 (35 & 36 Vict. c. 44))
Officers of the Exchequer (Ireland) Act 1836 (repealed)	6 & 7 Will. 4. c. 83	17 August 1836
An Act for the Regulation of the Offices of Vice Treasurer and Teller of the Exchequer in Ireland. (Repealed by Statute Law Revision (No. 2) Act 1888 (51 & 52 Vict. c. 57))
Valuation of Lands (Ireland) Act 1836 (repealed)	6 & 7 Will. 4. c. 84	17 August 1836
An Act to consolidate and amend the several Acts for the uniform Valuation of Lands and Tenements in Ireland; and to incorporate certain detached Portions of Counties and Baronies with those Counties and Baronies respectively whereto the same may adjoin or wherein the same are locally situate. (Repealed by Statute Law Revision Act 1874 (37 & 38 Vict. c. 35))
Marriage Act 1836 or the Act for Marriages in England 1836 or the Broomstick Marriage Act (repealed)	6 & 7 Will. 4. c. 85	17 August 1836
An Act for Marriages in England. (Repealed by Registration Service Act 1953 (1 & 2 Eliz. 2. c. 37))
Births and Deaths Registration Act 1836	6 & 7 Will. 4. c. 86	17 August 1836
An Act for registering Births, Deaths, and Marriages in England.
Liberties Act 1836 (repealed)	6 & 7 Will. 4. c. 87	17 August 1836
An Act for extinguishing the Secular Jurisdiction of the Archbishop of York and the Bishop of Ely in certain Liberties in the Counties of York, Nottingham, and Cambridge. (Repealed by Statute Law (Repeals) Act 1976 (c. 16))
Militia Ballots Suspension Act 1836 (repealed)	6 & 7 Will. 4. c. 88	17 August 1836
An Act to suspend to the End of the next Session of Parliament the making of Lists and the Ballots and Enrolments for the Militia of the United Kingdom. (Repealed by Statute Law Revision Act 1874 (37 & 38 Vict. c. 35))
Coroners (Ireland) Act 1836 or the Coroners Act 1836 (repealed)	6 & 7 Will. 4. c. 89	17 August 1836
An Act to provide for the Attendance and Remuneration of Medical Witnesses at Coroners Inquests. (Repealed for Northern Ireland by Coroners Act (Northern Ireland) 1959 (c. 15 (N.I.)))
Payment of Creditors (Scotland) Act 1836 (repealed)	6 & 7 Will. 4. c. 90	17 August 1836
An Act to continue until the First Day of May One thousand eight hundred and thirty-seven, and from thence to the End of the then next Session of Parliament, an Act of the Fifty-fourth Year of His Majesty King George the Third, (Note: Payment of Creditors (Scotland) Act 1814 (54 Geo. 3. c. 137)) for rendering the Payment of Creditors more equal and expeditious in Scotland. (Repealed by Statute Law Revision Act 1874 (37 & 38 Vict. c. 35))
Road from Sunk Island to Ottringham Act 1836 (repealed)	6 & 7 Will. 4. c. 91	17 August 1836
An Act to enable the Commissioners of His Majesty's Woods, Forests, Land Revenues, Works, and Buildings to make and maintain a Road from the Church in the Parish of Sunk Island to the Town of Ottringham in the East Riding of the County of York. (Repealed by Sunk Island Roads Act 1852 (15 & 16 Vict. c. xlv))
Marriages in St. Clements, Oxford Act 1836 (repealed)	6 & 7 Will. 4. c. 92	17 August 1836
An Act to render valid certain Marriages solemnized in the Church of Saint Clement, Oxford. (Repealed by Statute Law (Repeals) Act 1977 (c. 18))
Militia Pay Act 1836 (repealed)	6 & 7 Will. 4. c. 93	19 August 1836
An Act to defray the Charge of the Pay, Clothing, and contingent and other Expences of the Disembodied Militia in Great Britain and Ireland; and to grant Allowances in certain Cases to Subaltern Officers, Adjutants, Paymasters, Quartermasters, Surgeons, Assistant Surgeons, Surgeons Mates, and Serjeant Majors of the Militia, until the First Day of July One thousand eight hundred and thirty-seven. (Repealed by Statute Law Revision Act 1874 (37 & 38 Vict. c. 35))
Greek Loan Guarantee Act 1836 (repealed)	6 & 7 Will. 4. c. 94	19 August 1836
An Act to amend an Act (Note: Greek Loan Guarantee Act 1832 (2 & 3 Will. 4. c. 121)) for enabling His Majesty to carry into effect a Convention made between His Majesty the King of the French, the Emperor of all the Russias, and the King of Bavaria. (Repealed by Statute Law Revision Act 1874 (37 & 38 Vict. c. 35))
Tithe Compositions (Ireland) Act 1836 (repealed)	6 & 7 Will. 4. c. 95	19 August 1836
An Act to suspend, until the Sixth Day of April One thousand eight hundred and thirty-seven, Proceedings for recovering Payment of the Money advanced under the Acts for establishing Tithe Compositions in Ireland. (Repealed by Statute Law Revision Act 1874 (37 & 38 Vict. c. 35))
Parochial Assessments Act 1836 (repealed)	6 & 7 Will. 4. c. 96	19 August 1836
An Act to regulate Parochial Assessments. (Repealed by Rating and Valuation Act 1925 (15 & 16 Geo. 5. c. 90) and Local Government Act 1948 (11 & 12 Geo. 6. c. 26))
Duties on Offices and Pensions Act 1836 (repealed)	6 & 7 Will. 4. c. 97	19 August 1836
An Act for continuing and making perpetual the Duty on certain Offices and Pensions. (Repealed by Statute Law Revision Act 1958 (6 & 7 Eliz. 2. c. 46))
Appropriation Act 1836 (repealed)	6 & 7 Will. 4. c. 98	20 August 1836
An Act to apply the Sum of Four Millions out of the Consolidated Fund to the Service of the Year One thousand eight hundred and thirty-six, and to appropriate the Supplies granted in this Session of Parliament. (Repealed by Statute Law Revision Act 1874 (37 & 38 Vict. c. 35))
Church Temporalities (Ireland) Act 1836 or the Church Temporalities Act 1836	6 & 7 Will. 4. c. 99	20 August 1836
An Act to amend Two Acts passed respectively in the Third and Fourth (Note: Church Temporalities (Ireland) Act 1833 (3 & 4 Will. 4. c. 37)) and in the Fourth and Fifth (Note: Church Temporalities Act 1834 (4 & 5 Will. 4. c. 90)) Years of His present Majesty, for altering and amending the Laws relating to the Temporalities of the Church of Ireland.
Municipal Corporations (Ireland) Act 1836 (repealed)	6 & 7 Will. 4. c. 100	20 August 1836
An Act to restrain the Alienation of Corporate Property in certain Towns in Ireland. (Repealed by Statute Law Revision Act 1874 (37 & 38 Vict. c. 35))
Parliamentary Elections Act 1836 (repealed)	6 & 7 Will. 4. c. 101	20 August 1836
An Act to legalize certain Lists of Voters and of Claims and Objections for the present Year. (Repealed by Statute Law Revision Act 1874 (37 & 38 Vict. c. 35))
Parliamentary Elections (No. 2) Act 1836 (repealed)	6 & 7 Will. 4. c. 102	20 August 1836
An Act for rendering more easy the taking the Poll at County Elections. (Repealed by Ballot Act 1872 (35 & 36 Vict. c. 33))
Berwick-on-Tweed Act 1836 or the Municipal Corporation (Boundaries) Act 1836 (repealed)	6 & 7 Will. 4. c. 103	20 August 1836
An Act to make temporary Provision for the Boundaries of certain Boroughs. (Repealed by Local Authorities etc. (Miscellaneous Provision) (No. 2) Order 1974 (SI 1974/595))
Borough Fund in Certain Boroughs Act 1836 (repealed)	6 & 7 Will. 4. c. 104	20 August 1836
An Act for the better Administration of the Borough Fund in certain Boroughs. (Repealed by Municipal Corporations Act 1882 (45 & 46 Vict. c. 50))
Administration of Justice in Certain Boroughs Act 1836 (repealed)	6 & 7 Will. 4. c. 105	20 August 1836
An Act for the better Administration of Justice in certain Boroughs. (Repealed by Municipal Corporations Act 1882 (45 & 46 Vict. c. 50))
Stannaries Act 1836	6 & 7 Will. 4. c. 106	20 August 1836
An Act to make provision for the better and more expeditious Administration of Justice in the Stannaries of Cornwall, and for the enlarging the Jurisdiction and improving the Practice and Proceedings in the Courts of the said Stannaries.
Poor Relief (Loans) Act 1836 (repealed)	6 & 7 Will. 4. c. 107	20 August 1836
An Act to extend the Period for the Repayment of Loans made under an Act passed in the Fourth and Fifth Year of His present Majesty, (Note: Poor Law Amendment Act 1834 (4 & 5 Will. 4. c. 76)) for the Amendment and better Administration of the Laws relating to the Poor in England and Wales. (Repealed by Poor Law Act 1897 (60 & 61 Vict. c. 29))
Public Works (Ireland) Act 1836 (repealed)	6 & 7 Will. 4. c. 108	20 August 1836
An Act to amend an Act passed in the First and Second Years of his present Majesty, (Note: Public Works (Ireland) Act 1831 (1 & 2 Will. 4. c. 33)) for the Extension and Promotion of Public Works in Ireland. (Repealed by Statute Law Revision Act 1874 (37 & 38 Vict. c. 35), Statute Law Revision (No. 2) Act 1888 (51 & 52 Vict. c. 57), Statute Law Revision Act 1890 (53 & 54 Vict. c. 33), Statute Law Revision (No. 2) Act 1890 (53 & 54 Vict. c. 51) and Public Works etc., Loans Act (Northern Ireland) 1953 (c. 13 (N.I.)))
Coal Trade Act 1836 (repealed)	6 & 7 Will. 4. c. 109	20 August 1836
An Act to repeal certain Provisions respecting the Coal Trade. (Repealed by Statute Law Revision Act 1874 (37 & 38 Vict. c. 35))
Copyright Act 1836 (repealed)	6 & 7 Will. 4. c. 110	20 August 1836
An Act to repeal so much of an Act of the Fifty-fourth Year of King George the Third (Note: Copyright Act 1814 (54 Geo. 3. c. 156)) respecting Copyrights as requires the Delivery of a Copy of every published Book to the Libraries of Sian College, the Four Universities of Scotland, and of the King's Inns in Dublin. (Repealed by Copyright Act 1911 (1 & 2 Geo. 5. c. 46))
Previous Conviction Act 1836 (repealed)	6 & 7 Will. 4. c. 111	20 August 1836
An Act to prevent the Fact of a previous Conviction being given in Evidence to the Jury on the Case before them, except when Evidence to Character is given. (Repealed by Criminal Law Act 1967 (c. 58))
Court of Exchequer, Equity Side Act 1836 (repealed)	6 & 7 Will. 4. c. 112	20 August 1836
An Act for further facilitating the hearing and determining of Suits in Equity in His Majesty's Court of Exchequer at Westminster. (Repealed by Statute Law Revision Act 1861 (24 & 25 Vict. c. 101))
Exchequer Bills Act 1836 (repealed)	6 & 7 Will. 4. c. 113	20 August 1836
An Act for raising the Sum of Fourteen millions seven thousand nine hundred and fifty Pounds by Exchequer Bills, for the Service of the Year One thousand eight hundred and thirty-six. (Repealed by Statute Law Revision Act 1874 (37 & 38 Vict. c. 35))
Trials for Felony Act 1836 (repealed)	6 & 7 Will. 4. c. 114	20 August 1836
An Act for enabling Persons indicted of Felony to make their Defence by Counsel or Attorney. (Repealed by Criminal Law Act (Northern Ireland) 1967 (c. 18 (N.I.)) and Statute Law (Repeals) Act 1986 (c. 12))
Inclosure Act 1836 or the Common Field Inclosure Act 1836 (repealed)	6 & 7 Will. 4. c. 115	20 August 1836
An Act for facilitating the Inclosure of Open and Arable Fields in England and Wales. (Repealed by Commons Act 1899 (62 & 63 Vict. c. 30))
Grand Jury (Ireland) Act 1836	6 & 7 Will. 4. c. 116	20 August 1836
An Act to consolidate and amend the Laws relating to the Presentment of Public Money by Grand Juries in Ireland.
Kingstown Harbour Act 1836	6 & 7 Will. 4. c. 117	20 August 1836
An Act to amend several Acts relating to the Harbour of Kingstown.

=== Local acts ===
Short title	Citation	Royal assent
Long title
Reading and Whitley Gas Act 1836 (repealed)	6 & 7 Will. 4. c. i	18 March 1836
An Act for better lighting with Gas the Borough of Reading and Hamlet of Whitley in the County of Berks, by a Company to be called The Reading Union Gas Company. (Repealed by Reading Gas Act 1862 (25 & 26 Vict. c. lxxxiv))
Farnborough and Sevenoaks Road Act 1836	6 & 7 Will. 4. c. ii	18 March 1836
An Act to amend an Act passed in the Fifth Year of the Reign of His present Majesty, (Note: Farnborough and Sevenoaks Road Act 1835 (5 & 6 Will. 4. c. xx)) for repairing the Road from Farnborough (Note: Farnborough, Kent.) to Riverhill, in the Parish of Sevenoaks (Note: Sevenoaks, Kent.) in the County of Kent; and for making a new Line of Road to communicate therewith.
Bridgend Markets Act 1836	6 & 7 Will. 4. c. iii	30 March 1836
An Act for removing the Markets held in the Town or Village Bridgend in the County of Glamorgan, and for providing other Market Places in lieu thereof, and for regulating and maintaining the same.
Exeter Gas Act 1836 (repealed)	6 & 7 Will. 4. c. iv	30 March 1836
An Act to establish a Company for more effectually lighting with Gas the City and County of the City of Exeter, and certain Parishes and Places in the County of Devon. (Repealed by Exeter Gas Act 1865 (28 & 29 Vict. c. cxx))
Reading Gas Act 1836 (repealed)	6 & 7 Will. 4. c. v	30 March 1836
An Act for the better supplying the Borough of Reading in the County of Berks, and the Neighbourhood thereof, with Gas. (Repealed by Reading Gas Act 1862 (25 & 26 Vict. c. lxxxiv))
Clifton Suspension Bridge Act 1836 (repealed)	6 & 7 Will. 4. c. vi	30 March 1836
An Act for extending the Time for building a Bridge over the River Avon from Clifton in the County of Gloucester to the opposite Side of the River in the County of Somerset. (Repealed by Clifton Suspension Bridge Act 1952 (15 & 16 Geo. 6 & 1 Eliz. 2. c. xli))
Middlesex Hospital Act 1836 (repealed)	6 & 7 Will. 4. c. vii	30 March 1836
An Act to incorporate the Subscribers to the Middlesex Hospital, and for better enabling them to carry on their charitable Designs. (Repealed by Statute Law (Repeals) Act 2013 (c. 2))
Rochdale, Halifax and Ealand Road Act 1836	6 & 7 Will. 4. c. viii	30 March 1836
An Act for repairing and maintaining the Road from Rochdale in the County Palatine of Lancaster to Halifax and Ealand in the West Riding of the County of York.
Road from Buckingham to Newport Pagnell Act 1836	6 & 7 Will. 4. c. ix	30 March 1836
An Act for repairing the Road from the Town of Buckingham in the County of Buckingham to the West Chester or Holyhead Road in the Parish of Passenham in the County of Northampton, and from the North-east End of the Town of Stony Stratford to Newport Pagnell in the said County of Buckingham.
Radcliffe, Bolton and Bury Turnpike Road Act 1836	6 & 7 Will. 4. c. x	30 March 1836
An Act for making and maintaining a Turnpike Road and Branches leading from Radcliffe towards Bolton and Bury, an in the County of Lancaster.
Ipswich Assizes Act 1836 (repealed)	6 & 7 Will. 4. c. xi	22 April 1836
An Act for erecting a County Hall and Courts of Justice, and for providing Accommodation for His Majesty's Justices of Assize, for the Eastern Part of the County of Suffolk. (Repealed by Statute Law (Repeals) Act 2013 (c. 2))
Bodmin Assizes Act 1836 (repealed)	6 & 7 Will. 4. c. xii	22 April 1836
An Act for building new Courts of Assize at Bodmin for the County of Cornwall, and for providing Judges Lodgings, and ether Purposes connected therewith. (Repealed by Statute Law (Repeals) Act 2013 (c. 2))
Macclesfield Court of Requests Act 1836 (repealed)	6 & 7 Will. 4. c. xiii	22 April 1836
An Act for the more easy and speedy Recovery of Small Debts inthin the Prestbury Division of the Hundred of Macclesfield in the County of Chester. (Repealed by County Courts Act 1846 (9 & 10 Vict. c. 95))
Birmingham and Gloucester Railway Act 1836	6 & 7 Will. 4. c. xiv	22 April 1836
An Act for making a Railway from Birmingham to Gloucester, with a Branch therefrom.
Bristol and Clifton Oil and Gas Company Act 1836 (repealed)	6 & 7 Will. 4. c. xv	22 April 1836
An Act to enable the Bristol and Clifton Oil Gas Company to produce Gas from Coal and other Materials; and to amend the Act (Note: Bristol and Clifton Gas Act 1823 (4 Geo. 4. c. cii)) relating to the said Company. (Repealed by Bristol and Clifton Gaslight Act 1847 (10 & 11 Vict. c. xxvii))
Manchester Streets Act 1836 (repealed)	6 & 7 Will. 4. c. xvi	22 April 1836
An Act to enlarge the Powers of several Acts for effecting Improvements in the Streets and other Places within the Town of Manchester. (Repealed by Manchester General Improvement Act 1851 (14 & 15 Vict. c. cxix))
Richmond and Reeth Road Act 1836 (repealed)	6 & 7 Will. 4. c. xvii	22 April 1836
An Act for making a Turnpike Road from Richmond to Reeth in the County of York. (Repealed by Richmond (Yorkshire) to Reeth Road Act 1848 (11 & 12 Vict. c. cxlvii))
Lanark Roads and Crossford Bridge Act 1836	6 & 7 Will. 4. c. xviii	19 May 1836
An Act for altering and amending an Act of the Fourth and Fifth Years of the Reign of His present Majesty, intituled "An Act for making and for more effectually maintaining and repairing certain Roads in the County of Lanark, and for building a Bridge aver the River Clyde at Crossford in the said County." (Note: Lanark Roads and Crossford Bridge Act 1834 (4 & 5 Will. 4. c. lxxii))
Whatlington and Ewhurst Turnpike Road (Sussex) Act 1836	6 & 7 Will. 4. c. xix	19 May 1836
An Act for making and maintaining a Turnpike Road from Saint Leonarda and Saint Mary Magdalen to the Royal Oak Inn at Whatlington, and through Sedlescombe to Cripp's Corner in the Parish of Ewhurst, in the County of Sussex.
Westminster Hospital Act 1836 (repealed)	6 & 7 Will. 4. c. xx	19 May 1836
An Act to incorporate the Governors of the Westminster Hospital at the Broad Sanctuary, Westminster, and for conferring Powers the better to enable them to carry on their charitable Designs. (Repealed by Statute Law (Repeals) Act 2013 (c. 2))
Family Endowment Society Act 1836	6 & 7 Will. 4. c. xxi	19 May 1836
An Act to enable the Proprietors or Shareholders of the Family Endowment Society to sue and be sued in the Name of any One of the Directors or of the Chairman or Secretary for the Time being of the said Society.
Writers to the Signet Widows' Fund Act 1836 (repealed)	6 & 7 Will. 4. c. xxii	19 May 1836
An Act to alter and amend an Act passed in the First and Second Year of the Reign of His present Majesty, (Note: Writers to the Signet Widows' Fund Act 1831 (1 & 2 Will. 4. c. v)) for better raising and securing the Fund established for making Provision for the Widows of the Writers to His Majesty's Signet in Scotland. (Repealed by Writers to the Signet Widows' Fund Order Confirmation Act 1955 (4 & 5 Eliz. 2. c. ii))
Leicester Court of Requests Act 1836 (repealed)	6 & 7 Will. 4. c. xxiii	19 May 1836
An Act for the more easy and speedy Recovery of Small Debts within the Borough of Leicester in the County of Leicester. (Repealed by County Courts Act 1846 (9 & 10 Vict. c. 95))
Glasgow Judicial Buildings Act 1836	6 & 7 Will. 4. c. xxiv	19 May 1836
An Act for erecting and maintaining a Justiciary Court Hall and other Apartments for the Use of the Justiciary Court at Glasgow, and also Public Offices for the City of Glasgow and the Lower Ward of the County of Lanark; and for other Purposes therein mentioned.
Crediton Improvement Act 1836	6 & 7 Will. 4. c. xxv	19 May 1836
An Act for paving, lighting, watching, cleansing, and otherwise improving the Town of Crediton in the County of Devon.
Anti Dry Rot Company (Letters Patent) Act 1836	6 & 7 Will. 4. c. xxvi	19 May 1836
An Act to enable John Howard Kyan to assign to a Company certain Letters Patent.
Exeter Gas Act 1836 (repealed)	6 & 7 Will. 4. c. xxvii	19 May 1836
An Act to alter, amend, and enlarge the Powers of an Act (Note: Exeter Gas Act 1816 (56 Geo. 3. c. x)) for lighting with Gas the City and County of the City of Exeter. and for lighting with Gas the several Parishes of Alpington, Heavitree, Saint Leonard, Saint Thomas the Apostle, and Topsham, in the County of Devon. (Repealed by Exeter Gas Act 1865 (28 & 29 Vict. c. cxx))
New Mills and Hayfield Gas Act 1836 (repealed)	6 & 7 Will. 4. c. xxviii	19 May 1836
An Act for lighting with Gas the Towns of New Mills and Hayfield, and the Neighbourhoods thereof, in the County of Derby. (Repealed by New Mills Urban District Council Act 1906 (6 Edw. 7. c. xxxv))
Southampton Docks Act 1836	6 & 7 Will. 4. c. xxix	19 May 1836
An Act for making and maintaining a Dock or Docks at Southampton.
Wearmouth Dock Entrance Act 1836	6 & 7 Will. 4. c. xxx	19 May 1836
An Act to enable the Wearmouth Dock Company to make and maintain a proper and convenient Entrance into the Wearmouth Dock at the Port of Sunderland in the County Palatine of Durham.
St. Katharine Docks Act 1836 (repealed)	6 & 7 Will. 4. c. xxxi	19 May 1836
An Act to enlarge the Powers of the several Acts passed for making and maintaining the Saint Katharine Docks in the County of Middlesex. (Repealed by Port of London (Consolidation) Act 1920 (10 & 11 Geo. 5. c. clxxiii))
Dundee and Arbroath Railway Act 1836	6 & 7 Will. 4. c. xxxii	19 May 1836
An Act for making and maintaining a Railway from the Royal Burgh of Dundee in the County of Forfar to the Royal Burgh of Arbroath in the same County.
Ulster Railway Act 1836	6 & 7 Will. 4. c. xxxiii	19 May 1836
An Act for making a Railway from the Town of Belfast to the City of Armagh in the Province of Ulster in Ireland.
Arbroath and Forfar Railway Act 1836	6 & 7 Will. 4. c. xxxiv	19 May 1836
An Act for making and maintaining a Railway between the Royal Burgh of Arbroath in the County of Forfar and the Royal Burgh of Forfar in the same County.
Birmingham and Derby Junction Railway Act 1836	6 & 7 Will. 4. c. xxxv	19 May 1836
An Act for making a Railway from the London and Birmingham Railway near Birmingham, to Derby, to be called "The Birmingham and Derby Junction Railway," with a Branch.
Bristol and Exeter Railway Act 1836	6 & 7 Will. 4. c. xxxvi	19 May 1836
An Act for making a Railway from Bristol to Exeter, with Branches to the Towns of Bridgwater in the County of Somerset and Tiverton in the County of Devon.
Aylesbury Railway Act 1836	6 & 7 Will. 4. c. xxxvii	19 May 1836
An Act for making a Railway from Aylesbury to join the London and Birmingham Railway near the Village of Cheddington in the County of Buckingham.
Great Western Railway Act 1836	6 & 7 Will. 4. c. xxxviii	19 May 1836
An Act to alter the Line of the Great Western Railway, and to amend the Act relating thereto.
Leeds Victoria Bridge Act 1836	6 & 7 Will. 4. c. xxxix	19 May 1836
An Act for building a Bridge over the River Aire at Leeds, and for making convenient Roads, Avenues, and Approaches thereto.
Henley Bridge Act 1836	6 & 7 Will. 4. c. xl	19 May 1836
An Act for amending and enlarging the Powers of the several Acts for building a Bridge over the River Thames at Henley-upon-Thames in the County of Oxford.
Aberystwyth Harbour Act 1836 (repealed)	6 & 7 Will. 4. c. xli	19 May 1836
An Act to alter and amend an Act passed in the Twentieth Year of His late Majesty King George the Third, intituled "An Act for repairing, enlarging, and preserving the Harbour of Aberystwyth in the County of Cardigan." (Note: Aberystwyth Harbour Act 1780 (20 Geo. 3. c. 26)) (Repealed by Aberystwyth Harbour Act 1987 (c. xiv))
Teignmouth Harbour Act 1836 (repealed)	6 & 7 Will. 4. c. xlii	19 May 1836
An Act for improving, maintaining, and regulating the Harbour of Teigmmouth and the Navigation of the River Teign in the County of Devon. (Repealed by Teignmouth Harbour Act 1853 (16 & 17 Vict. c. xxxvi))
Forth and Clyde Navigation Act 1836	6 & 7 Will. 4. c. xliii	19 May 1836
An Act for improving, enlarging, and extending the Forth and Clyde Navigation, and certain Harbours and Works belonging thereto and connected therewith; and for making and maintaining Two Branch Cuts or Canals from the said Navigation.
British Alkali Company Act 1836	6 & 7 Will. 4. c. xliv	19 May 1836
An Act to enable the British Alkali Company to sue and be sued in the Name of the Secretary or of any One Member for the Time being of the said Company.
Nottingham Cemetery Act 1836 (repealed)	6 & 7 Will. 4. c. xlv	19 May 1836
An Act for establishing a General Cemetery in the Town and County oi the Town of Nottingham. (Repealed by Statute Law (Repeals) Act 1995 (c. 44))
Hollington and Hastings Turnpike Road Act 1836	6 & 7 Will. 4. c. xlvi	19 May 1836
An Act for making and maintaining as Turnpike a Road leading from the Flimwell to Hastings Turnpike Road at or near Beauport in the Parish of Hollington to Hastings in the County of Sussex.
Poole Roads Act 1836 (repealed)	6 & 7 Will. 4. c. xlvii	19 May 1836
An Act for repairing and improving certain Roads in and leading to and from the Town and County of the Town of Poole, and for making certain new Lines of Road in the said Town and County, and leading thence towards Wareham and Blandford in the County of Dorset. (Repealed by Poole Roads Act 1867 (30 & 31 Vict. c. xl))
Ugborough and Modbury Road (Devon) Act 1836	6 & 7 Will. 4. c. xlviii	19 May 1836
An Act for more effectually repairing the Road from the Totnes Road at Lady Down in the Parish of Ugborough to within Four hundred Yards of the Bridge over the Lary, and for repairing the Road communicating therewith from Hollowcombe Cross to the Town of Modbury and Dark Lane, all in the County of Devon.
Road from Harlow Bush Common Act 1836 (repealed)	6 & 7 Will. 4. c. xlix	19 May 1836
An Act for more effectually repairing the Roads from Harlow Bush Common to and into the Parish of Woodford, and the Road from Epping to Writtle, and other Roads therein mentioned, all in the County of Essex. (Repealed by Statute Law (Repeals) Act 2008 (c. 12))
Ashford and Maidstone Road Act 1836 (repealed)	6 & 7 Will. 4. c. l	19 May 1836
An Act for the more effectually repairing, improving, and maintaining the Road from the Town of Ashford to the Town of Maidstone in the County of Kent. (Repealed by Annual Turnpike Acts Continuance Act 1869 (32 & 33 Vict. c. 90))
Forth and Cart Junction Canal Act 1836	6 & 7 Will. 4. c. li	20 May 1836
An Act to make and maintain a Canal in the County of Dumbarton from the Forth and Clyde Canal to the River of Clyde opposite to the River of Cart.
Bolton and Leigh Railway Act 1836 (repealed)	6 & 7 Will. 4. c. lii	20 May 1836
An Act to amend and enlarge the several Acts relating to the Bolton and Leigh Railway, and for other Purposes. (Repealed by Grand Junction Railway Act 1845 (8 & 9 Vict. c. cxcviii))
Wakefield and Sheffield Road Act 1836	6 & 7 Will. 4. c. liii	20 May 1836
An Act for repairing and improving the Road from Wakefield to Sheffield in the County of York.
Universal Life Assurance Society Act 1836	6 & 7 Will. 4. c. liv	7 June 1836
An Act for enabling the Universal Life Assurance Society to sue and be sued in the Name of the Actuary for the Time being or of any One of the Directors of the said Society.
Imperial Continental Gas Association Act 1836 (repealed)	6 & 7 Will. 4. c. lv	7 June 1836
An Act for granting further Powers to a Company called "The Imperial Continental Gas Association." (Repealed by Imperial Continental Gas Association Act 1853 (16 & 17 Vict. c. cxc))
Birmingham Coal Company Act 1836	6 & 7 Will. 4. c. lvi	7 June 1836
An Act to amend an Act to enable the Birmingham Coal Company, to sue and be sued in the Name of the Secretary or One of the Members of the said Company; and to authorize the said Company to borrow a further Sum of Money; and for other Purposes relating to the said Company.
Brandling Junction Railway Company Act 1836	6 & 7 Will. 4. c. lvii	7 June 1836
An Act for incorporating certain Persons for carrying into effect the Purposes of an Act passed in the Fifth and Sixth Year of the Reign of His present Majesty, intituled "An Act for making John Brandling and Robert William Brandling Esquires to purchase and take Leases of Lands and Hereditaments for the Formation of a Railway from Gateshead to South Shields and Monkwearmouth, all in the County Palatine of Durham, with Branches therefrom;" (Note: Gateshead and Monks Wearmouth Railway Act 1835 (5 & 6 Will. 4. c. lxxxiii)) and for other Purposes.
Dukinfield Water Act 1836	6 & 7 Will. 4. c. lviii	7 June 1836
An Act for better supplying with Water the Township of Dukinfield in the County Palatine of Chester.
Teignmouth Improvement Act 1836	6 & 7 Will. 4. c. lix	7 June 1836
An Act for better paving, lighting, watching, and improving the Town of Teignmouth in the County of Devon, and for supplying the Inhabitants thereof with Water.
Port Carlisle Dock Act 1836 (repealed)	6 & 7 Will. 4. c. lx	7 June 1836
An Act to enable the Carlisle Canal Company to make a Dock or Docks at Port Carlisle otherwise Fishers Cross, and for amending and enlarging the Powers and Provisions of the Act for making and maintaining the said Canal. (Repealed by Port Carlisle Dock and Railway Act 1853 (16 & 17 Vict. c. cxix))
Dundee Harbour Act 1836 (repealed)	6 & 7 Will. 4. c. lxi	7 June 1836
An Act to alter, amend, and extend the Powers of an Act passed in the Eleventh Year of the Reign of His late Majesty, (Note: Dundee Harbour Act 1830 (11 Geo. 4 & 1 Will. 4. c. cxix)) for more effectually maintaining, improving, and extending the Harbour of Dundee in the County of Forfar. (Repealed by Dundee Harbour Consolidation Act 1875 (38 & 39 Vict. c. cl))
Grampound and Western Taphouse Lane Road (Cornwall) Act 1836	6 & 7 Will. 4. c. lxii	7 June 1836
An Act for more effectually repairing and improving the Road from the Eastern End of the Borough of Grampound, through the Towns of Saint Austell and Lostwithiel, and thence to the East End of the Western Taphouse Lane, in the County of Cornwall; and for making and maintaining certain new Roads communicating therewith.
Deptford Pier Junction Railway Act 1836	6 & 7 Will. 4. c. lxiii	21 June 1836
An Act for making a Railway from the London and Greenwich Railway to the Deptford Pier, to be called "The Deptford Pier Junction Railway."
Borough of Bristol Borrowings Act 1836	6 & 7 Will. 4. c. lxiv	21 June 1836
An Act to enable the Mayor, Aldermen, and Burgesses of the Borough of Bristol to raise a Sum of Money towards discharging the Monies borrowed under the Authority of an Act (Note: Bristol Riots Act 1832 (2 & 3 Will. 4. lxxxviii)) passed in the Second Year of the Reign of His present Majesty.
River Tweed Fisheries Act 1836 (repealed)	6 & 7 Will. 4. c. lxv	21 June 1836
An Act to alter, amend, and enlarge the Powers of an Act paged in the Eleventh Year of the Reign of His late Majesty, intituled "An Act for the more effectual Preservation and Increase of the Breed of Salmon, and for better regulating the Fisheries in the River Tweed, and the Rivers and Streams running into the same, and abo within the Mouth or Entrance of the said River." (Note: River Tweed Fisheries Act 1830 (11 Geo. 4 & 1 Will. 4. c. liv)) (Repealed by Tweed Fisheries Act 1857 (20 & 21 Vict. c. cxlviii))
Newport (Monmouthshire) Harbour Act 1836	6 & 7 Will. 4. c. lxvi	21 June 1836
An Act for regulating, preserving, and improving the Port or Harbour of Newport in the County of Monmouth.
Gloucester Water Act 1836 (repealed)	6 & 7 Will. 4. c. lxvii	21 June 1836
An Act for better supplying with Water the City of Gloucester and Parishes and Places in the County of Gloucester near thereto. (Repealed by Gloucester Waterworks Act 1855 (18 & 19 Vict. c. lxxxix))
Hungerford Market Company Act 1836	6 & 7 Will. 4. c. lxviii	21 June 1836
An Act to alter and enlarge the Powers of an Act passed in the Eleventh Year of the Reign of His late Majesty, (Note: Hungerford Market Company Act 1830 (11 Geo. 4 & 1 Will. 4. c. lxx)) for incorporating the Hungerford Market Company.
Perlethorpe Chapelry (Nottinghamshire) Act 1836	6 & 7 Will. 4. c. lxix	21 June 1836
An Act to enable Charles Herbert Earl Manners to endow the Chapelry of Perlethorpe in the Pariah of Edwinstowe in the County of Nottingham, to create the same a separate Benefice, and to vest the Nomination of the Incumbents thereof in the said Earl and his Heirs.
Beverley Commons Act 1836	6 & 7 Will. 4. c. lxx	21 June 1836
An Act to provide for the better Regulation of certain Common Pastures within the Borough of Beverley in the East Riding of the County of York.
Newry Navigation Act 1836	6 & 7 Will. 4. c. lxxi	21 June 1836
An Act to extend the Time limited by an Act passed in the Tenth Year of the Reign of His late Majesty King George the Fourth (Note: Newry Navigation Act 1829 (10 Geo. 4. c. cxxvi)) for the Improvement of the Newry Navigation.
Ulster Canal Act 1836	6 & 7 Will. 4. c. lxxii	21 June 1836
An Act to amend and enlarge the Powers and Provisions of the several Acts for making and maintaining the Ulster Canal in the Counties of Fermanagh, Monaghan, and Armagh in Ireland.
King Street, Greenwich, Improvement Act 1836	6 & 7 Will. 4. c. lxxiii	21 June 1836
An Act to enable the Commissioners of Greenwich Hospital to improve a certain Street called King Street, in the Parish of Greenwich in the County of Kent; and for other Purposes.
Newton Abbot Approach Road Act 1836	6 & 7 Will. 4. c. lxxiv	21 June 1836
An Act for improving the Approach to the Town of Newton Abbot from the City of Exeter, through the Village of Kingsteignton, in the County of Devon.
South Eastern Railway Act 1836	6 & 7 Will. 4. c. lxxv	21 June 1836
An Act for making a Railway from the London and Croydon Railway to Dover, to be called "The Southeastern Railway."
Newcastle-upon-Tyne and North Shields Railway Act 1836	6 & 7 Will. 4. c. lxxvi	21 June 1836
An Act for making and maintaining a Railway from the Town of Newcastle-upon-Tyne in the County of the Town of Newcastle-upon-Tyne to North Shields in the County of Northumberland, with a Branch thereout in the County of Northumberland.
Cheltenham and Great Western Union Railway Act 1836	6 & 7 Will. 4. c. lxxvii	21 June 1836
An Act for making a Railway from Cheltenham and from Gloucester, to join the Great Western Railway near Swindon, to be called "The Cheltenham and Great Western Union Railway," with a Branch to Cirencester.
Midland Counties Railway Act 1836 (repealed)	6 & 7 Will. 4. c. lxxviii	21 June 1836
An Act for making a Railway, with Branches, commencing at the London and Birmingham Railway in the Parish of Rugby the County of Warwick, to communicate with the Towns of Leicester, Nottingham, and Derby, to be called "The Midland Counties Railway." (Repealed by Midland Railway Consolidation Act 1844 (7 & 8 Vict. c. xviii))
Birmingham, Bristol and Thames Junction Railway Act 1836	6 & 7 Will. 4. c. lxxix	21 June 1836
An Act for making a Railway from the Basin of the Kensington Canal at Kensington to join the London and Birmingham and Great Western Railways at or near Holsden Green in the County of Middlesex, and to be called "The Birmingham, Bristol and Thames Junction Railway."
Hull and Selby Railway Act 1836	6 & 7 Will. 4. c. lxxx	21 June 1836
An Act for making a Railway from Kingston-upon-Hull to Selby.
York and North Midland Railway Act 1836	6 & 7 Will. 4. c. lxxxi	21 June 1836
An Act for making a Railway from the City of York to and into the Township of Altofts, with various Branches of Railway, all in the West Riding of the County of York or County of the said City.
Taff Vale Railway Act 1836	6 & 7 Will. 4. c. lxxxii	21 June 1836
An Act for making a Railway from Merthyr Tydfil to Cardiff, to be called "The Taff Vale Railway," with Branches.
Cow-Cawsey, Belford and Buckton Burn Turnpike Road (Northumberland) Act 1836	6 & 7 Will. 4. c. lxxxiii	21 June 1836
An Act for more effectually improving and maintaining the Turnpike Road leading from the Cow-Cawsey near the Town of Newcastle-upon-Tyne to the Town of Belford, and from thence to Buckton Burn, in the County of Northumberland.
Newton Bushell, South Bovey and Moretonhampstead Roads Act 1836 (repealed)	6 & 7 Will. 4. c. lxxxiv	21 June 1836
An Act to amend an Act of the Seventh Year of the Reign of His late Majesty King George the Fourth, (Note: Newton Bushell, South Bovey and Moretonhampstead Roads Act 1826 (7 Geo. 4. c. xcii)) for more effectually repairing and improving the several Roads leading to and from the Towns of Newton Bushell, South Bovey, and Moretonhampstead in the County of Devon. (Repealed by Annual Turnpike Acts Continuance Act 1872 (35 & 36 Vict. c. 85))
Birstal and Huddersfield Roads Act 1836	6 & 7 Will. 4. c. lxxxv	21 June 1836
An Act to amend an Act passed in the Ninth Year of the Reign of King George the Fourth, (Note: Birstal and Huddersfield Roads Act 1828 (9 Geo. 4. c. lxxxiii)) for diverting, improving, and maintaining the Roads between the Towns of Birstal and Huddersfield in the West Riding of the County of York.
Teignmouth and Dawlish Road Act 1836	6 & 7 Will. 4. c. lxxxvi	21 June 1836
An Act for more effectually maintaining the Road from Teignmouth to Dawlish, and for making Roads from Dawlish to the Exeter Turnpike Roads, and certain Branches communicating with the same, all in the County of Devon; and to make and maintain other Roads communicating with the said Roads.
Marlborough and Salisbury Road Act 1836	6 & 7 Will. 4. c. lxxxvii	21 June 1836
An Act to vary and alter the Line of the Marlborough and Salisbury Road, and for making a Road from the same to Amesbury in the County of Wilts.
Portland Street Bridge, Glasgow Act 1836 (repealed)	6 & 7 Will. 4. c. lxxxviii	4 July 1836
An Act for authorizing the Trustees on the Bridges over the Clyde at Glasgow to continue, uphold, repair, and maintain the Wooden Bridge over the said River opposite to Portland Street of Laurieston; and for other Purposes therein mentioned. (Repealed by Glasgow Bridges Act 1845 (8 & 9 Vict. c. cxxxiii))
Schotts Road and Hamilton Bridge Act 1836	6 & 7 Will. 4. c. lxxxix	4 July 1836
An Act for altering and extending the Powers of the Trustees upon the Road from Livingston by Shotts to the City of Glasgow, and placing under their Charge the Bridge across the River of Clyde called Hamilton Bridge, and the Avenues thereto, and the Road between the East and the West Ends of the Town of Hamilton.
River Suir Navigation and Canal Act 1836	6 & 7 Will. 4. c. xc	4 July 1836
An Act for improving and maintaining the Navigation of the River Suir, and for making and constructing a Ship Canal at Carrick on Suir.
Tolcross Gas and Water Act 1836	6 & 7 Will. 4. c. xci	4 July 1836
An Act for lighting with Gas and supplying with Water the Town of Tolcross and Places adjacent in the County of Lanark.
River Nene and Wisbech River Act 1836	6 & 7 Will. 4. c. xcii	4 July 1836
An Act for altering and amending several Acts passed for improving the Outfall of the River Nene and the Drainage of the Lands discharging their Waters into the Wisbech River.
Liverpool Fire Police Act 1836 (repealed)	6 & 7 Will. 4. c. xciii	4 July 1836
An Act for extending and improving the Maintenance of the Fire Police in the Borough of Liverpool. (Repealed by Liverpool Improvement Act 1842 (5 & 6 Vict. c. cvi))
Wessenden Valley Reservoir Embankment Act 1836 (repealed)	6 & 7 Will. 4. c. xciv	4 July 1836
An Act for enlarging the Embankment of a Reservoir in the Valley of Wessenden in the Township of Marsden and Parish of Almondbury in the West Riding of the County of York, and for other Purposes. (Repealed by West Yorkshire Act 1980 (c. xiv))
Bann Reservoir Act 1836	6 & 7 Will. 4. c. xcv	4 July 1836
An Act for providing a more abundant and regular Supply of Water in the River called the Upper Bann, in Ireland.
Southampton Waterworks Act 1836	6 & 7 Will. 4. c. xcvi	4 July 1836
An Act for maintaining the Public Conduits and other Waterworks belonging to the Town of Southampton, and for providing an additional Supply of Water for the Inhabitants of the said Town and Neighbourhood.
Irish Waste Land Improvement Society Act 1836	6 & 7 Will. 4. c. xcvii	4 July 1836
An Act for incorporating a Company for the Improvement of Waste Lands in Ireland.
Aberavon Port and Harbour Act 1836	6 & 7 Will. 4. c. xcviii	4 July 1836
An Act to alter and amend an Act of His present Majesty, for improving the Port and Harbour of Aberavon in the County of Glamorgan, to further improve the said Harbour, and to change its Name.
Bank of British North America Act 1836	6 & 7 Will. 4. c. xcix	4 July 1836
An Act to enable the Proprietors or Shareholders of a Company called "The Bank of British North America" to sue and be sued in the Name of any One of the Directors or of the Secretary for the Time being of the said Company.
Dublin Steam Packet Act 1836 (repealed)	6 & 7 Will. 4. c. c	4 July 1836
An Act to authorize the City of Dublin Steam Packet Company to apply a Portion of certain Monies already subscribed in fulfilment of their Contracts for building Six additional Steam Vessels, and to legalize such Subscription. (Repealed by Statute Law (Repeals) Act 2013 (c. 2))
Parrett Navigation and Canal Act 1836 or the Parrett Navigation Act 1836	6 & 7 Will. 4. c. ci	4 July 1836
An Act for improving the Navigation of a Portion of the River Parrett, and for making a Navigable Canal from the said River to Barrington, all in the County of Somerset.
Dundee and Newtyle Railway Act 1836	6 & 7 Will. 4. c. cii	4 July 1836
An Act to amend the Acts for making a Railway from Dundee to Newtyle in the County of Forfar.
Northern and Eastern Railway Act 1836	6 & 7 Will. 4. c. ciii	4 July 1836
An Act for making a Railway to form a Communication between London and Cambridge, with a view to its being extended hereafter to the Northern and Eastern Counties of England.
London Grand Junction Railway Act 1836	6 & 7 Will. 4. c. civ	4 July 1836
An Act for making a Railway to join the London and Birmingham Railway at or near the Regent's Canal in the Parish of Saint Pancras in the County of Middlesex, and proceed from thence to Skinner Street in the City of London, to be called "The London Grand Junction Railway."
Great North of England Railway Act 1836	6 & 7 Will. 4. c. cv	4 July 1836
An Act for making a Railway from near the River Tyne to or near the River Tees, to be called "The Great North of England Railway," in the County of Durham.
Eastern Counties Railway Act 1836	6 & 7 Will. 4. c. cvi	4 July 1836
An Act for making a Railway from London to Norwich and Yarmouth, by Romford, Chelmsford, Colchester, and Ipswich, to be called "The Eastern Counties Railway."
North Midland Railway Act 1836 (repealed)	6 & 7 Will. 4. c. cvii	4 July 1836
An Act for making a Railway from Leeds to Derby, to be called "The North Midland Railway." (Repealed by British Railways Act 1980 (c. ix))
Thames Haven, Dock and Railway Act 1836 (repealed)	6 & 7 Will. 4. c. cviii	4 July 1836
An Act for making a Railway from or near Romford in the County of Essex to Shell Haven in the same County, and for constructing a Tide Dock at the Termination of the said Railway at Shell Haven aforesaid. (Repealed by Thames Haven Dock Company's Act 1856 (19 & 20 Vict. c. cxix))
Sheffield and Rotherham Railway Act 1836 (repealed)	6 & 7 Will. 4. c. cix	4 July 1836
An Act for making a Railway from Sheffield to Rotherham, with a Branch therefrom to Greasbrough Canal, all in the West Riding of the County of York. (Repealed by Sheffield and Rotherham and Midland Railways Consolidation Act 1845 (8 & 9 Vict. c. xc))
Hayle Railway Act 1836	6 & 7 Will. 4. c. cx	4 July 1836
An Act to enable the Hayle Railway Company to make certain Alterations in the Lines of such Railway, and for other Purposes relating thereto.
Manchester and Leeds Railway Act 1836	6 & 7 Will. 4. c. cxi	4 July 1836
An Act for making a Railway from Manchester to Leeds.
Herne Bay Pier Act 1836	6 & 7 Will. 4. c. cxii	4 July 1836
An Act for altering, amending, and enlarging the Powers and Provisions of an Act (Note: Herne Bay Pier Act 1831 (1 Will. 4. c. xxv)) for making and maintaining a Pier or Jetty and other Works at Heme Bay in the Parish of Hems in the County of Kent; and for giving additional Powers to the Heme Bay Pier Company.
Sidmouth Harbour Act 1836	6 & 7 Will. 4. c. cxiii	4 July 1836
An Act for making and maintaining a Harbour and other Works at Sidmouth in the County of Devon.
Tralee Navigation and Harbour Act 1836	6 & 7 Will. 4. c. cxiv	4 July 1836
An Act to extend the Time limited by an Act passed in the Ninth Year of the Reign of His late Majesty King George the Fourth, (Note: Tralee Harbour Act 1828 (9 Geo. 4. c. cxviii)) for improving the Navigation and Harbour of Tralee in the County of Kerry.
Manchester and Salford Junction Canal Act 1836	6 & 7 Will. 4. c. cxv	4 July 1836
An Act for making and maintaining a Navigable Canal to connect the Rochdale Canal and the River Irwell in the Township of Manchester in the County of Lancaster.
Haverfordwest Bridge over River Dungleddau Act 1836 (repealed)	6 & 7 Will. 4. c. cxvi	4 July 1836
An Act to explain and amend an Act passed in the Third Year of the Reign of His present Majesty, intituled "An Act for erecting a Bridge over the River Dungleddau, within the Town and County of Haverfordwest and the Liberties thereof." (Note: Haverfordwest Bridge over River Dungleddau Act 1833 (3 & 4 Will. 4. c. cii)) (Repealed by Dyfed Act 1987 (c. xxiv))
Galway Improvement Act 1836 (repealed)	6 & 7 Will. 4. c. cxvii	4 July 1836
An Act tor regulating and improving the Town of Galway in the County of the same Town. (Repealed by Galway Town Improvement Act 1853 (16 & 17 Vict. c. cc))
Road from Dewsbury to Ealand Act 1836	6 & 7 Will. 4. c. cxviii	4 July 1836
An Act for repairing, maintaining, and improving the Road from Dewsbury to Ealand in the West Riding of the County of York.
Liverpool Fire and Life Assurance Act 1836 (repealed)	6 & 7 Will. 4. c. cxix	14 July 1836
An Act to enable the Liverpool Fire and Life Insurance Company to sue and be sued in the Name of the Chairman, Deputy Chairman, or of any One of the Directors of the said Company; and for other Purposes. (Repealed by Liverpool and London and Globe Insurance Company's Act 1904 (4 Edw. 7. c. xxxiv))
Surrey and Kent Courts of Request Act 1836 (repealed)	6 & 7 Will. 4. c. cxx	14 July 1836
An Act for the Amendment of Three several Acts passed in the Sixth, (Note: Small Debts, Kent, etc. Act 1766 (6 Geo. 3. c. 6)) Tenth, (Note: Blackheath, etc., Small Debts Act 1770 (10 Geo. 3. c. 29)) and Forty-seventh (Note: Blackheath, &c. Court of Requests Act 1807 (47 Geo. 3 Sess. 1. c. iv)) Years of the Reign of His late Majesty George the Third, for the Recovery of Small Debts within the Hundreds of Blackheath, of Bromley and Beckenham, of Rokesley otherwise Ruxley, and of Little and Lessness, in the County of Kent, and within the Hundred of Wallington in the County of Surrey; and to extend the Powers thereof. (Repealed by County Courts Act 1846 (9 & 10 Vict. c. 95))
London and Croydon Railway (Southwark Station) Act 1836	6 & 7 Will. 4. c. cxxi	14 July 1836
An Act to enable the London and Croydon Railway Company to provide a Station and other Works in the Parish of Saint Olave in the Borough of Southwark in the County of Surrey; and to amend the Act (Note: London and Croydon Railway Act 1835 (5 & 6 Will. 4. c. x)) relating to the said Railway.
Preston and Longridge Railway Act 1836	6 & 7 Will. 4. c. cxxii	14 July 1836
An Act for making and maintaining a Railway from Preston to Longridge in the County Palatine of Lancaster.
Commercial Railway Act 1836	6 & 7 Will. 4. c. cxxiii	28 July 1836
An Act for making a Railway from the Minories to Blackwall, with Branches, to be called "The Commercial Railway."
Tremoutha Haven, Harbour and Railway Act 1836	6 & 7 Will. 4. c. cxxiv	28 July 1836
An Act for making and maintaining a Harbour and Breakwaters at Tremoutha Haven in the County of Cornwall; and for making and maintaining a Railway from thence to the Town of Launceston in the same County.
Dover Harbour Act 1836 (repealed)	6 & 7 Will. 4. c. cxxv	28 July 1836
An Act to amend an Act (Note: Dover Harbour Act 1828 (9 Geo. 4. c. xxxi)) for more effectually maintaining and improving the Harbour of Dover in the County of Kent. (Repealed by Dover Harbour Act 1953 (1 & 2 Eliz. 2. c. xxix))
Swansea Harbour Act 1836 (repealed)	6 & 7 Will. 4. c. cxxvi	28 July 1836
An Act to alter and amend several Acts for the Improvement of the Harbour of Swansea in the County of Glamorgan, and for further improving the said Harbour. (Repealed by Swansea Harbour Act 1854 (17 & 18 Vict. c. cxxvi))
River Suir Navigation and Canal (No. 2) Act 1836	6 & 7 Will. 4. c. cxxvii	28 July 1836
An Act to rectify a Mistake in an Act passed in the present Session of Parliament, (Note: River Suir Navigation and Canal Act 1836 (6 & 7 Will. 4. c. xc)) for improving and maintaining the Navigation of the River Suir, and for making and constructing a Ship Canal at Carrick on Suir.
Greenwich Pier Act 1836	6 & 7 Will. 4. c. cxxviii	28 July 1836
An Act for making and maintaining a Pier Wharf and other Works at Greenwich in the County of Kent.
South Metropolitan Cemetery Company Act 1836	6 & 7 Will. 4. c. cxxix	28 July 1836
An Act for establishing a Cemetery for the Interment of the Dead, Southward of the Metropolis, to be called "The South Metropolitan Cemetery."
Irish Sea Fisheries Act 1836	6 & 7 Will. 4. c. cxxx	28 July 1836
An Act for establishing a Joint Stock Company for the Prosecution and Extension of the Fisheries off the Shores of Ireland, and for the Improvement of the Sea Coasts in Connexion with such Fisheries.
Edinburgh, Leith and Granton Railway Act 1836 or the Edinburgh, Leith and Newhaven Railway Act 1836	6 & 7 Will. 4. c. cxxxi	13 August 1836
An Act for making and maintaining a Railway or Railways from the City of Edinburgh to Leith, and to the Shore of the Frith of Forth at or near to Newhaven and Trinity, all in the County of Edinburgh.
Dublin and Drogheda Railway Act 1836	6 & 7 Will. 4. c. cxxxii	13 August 1836
An Act for making a Railway from Dublin to Drogheda.
Hungerford Market Foot Bridge Act 1836	6 & 7 Will. 4. c. cxxxiii	13 August 1836
An Act for building a Foot Bridge over the River Thames from Hungerford Market in the Parish of Saint Martin in the Fields in the County of Middlesex to the opposite Shore in the Parish of Lambeth in the County of Surrey, and for making suitable Approaches thereto.
Church Street Bridge Act 1836	6 & 7 Will. 4. c. cxxxiv	13 August 1836
An Act for erecting and maintaining a Bridge across the River Thames from Church Street in the Parish of Saint Mary Lambeth in the County of Surrey to the opposite Bank of the said River near Market Street in the Parish of Saint John the Evangelist within the City and Liberty of Westminster in the County of Middlesex.
Liverpool Court of Requests Act 1836 or the Liverpool Court of Passage Act 1836 (repealed)	6 & 7 Will. 4. c. cxxxv	13 August 1836
An Act to amend and render more effectual an Act passed in the Fourth and Fifth Year of the Reign of His present Majesty, intituled "An Act for amending the Proceedings and Practice of the Court of Passage of the Borough of Liverpool in the County Palatine of Lancaster"; (Note: Liverpool Court of Passage Act 1834 (4 & 5 Will. 4. c. xcii)) and to repeal an Act passed in the Twenty-fifth Year of the Reign of His late Majesty King George the Second, intituled "An Act for the more easy and speedy Recovery of Small Debts in the Town and Port of Liverpool and Liberties thereof in the County Palatine of Lancaster;" (Note: Small Debts, Liverpool Act 1751 (25 Geo. 2. c. 43)) and to give further Power for the Recovery of Small Debts within the Borough of Liverpool. (Repealed by Liverpool Corporation Act 1921 (11 & 12 Geo. 5. c. lxxiv))
London Cemetery Company Act 1836	6 & 7 Will. 4. c. cxxxvi	17 August 1836
An Act for establishing Cemeteries for the Interment of the Dead, Northward, Southward, and Eastward of the Metropolis, by a Company to be called "The London Cemetery Company."
Westminster Court of Requests Act 1836 (repealed)	6 & 7 Will. 4. c. cxxxvii	19 August 1836
An Act to repeal Two Acts of the Reign of King George the Second, for the Recovery of Small Debts within the City and Liberty of Westminster, and for granting more effectual Powers for that Purpose. (Repealed by County Courts Act 1846 (9 & 10 Vict. c. 95))
Anniesland and St. George's Turnpike Road Act 1836 (repealed)	6 & 7 Will. 4. c. cxxxviii	19 August 1836
An Act for making and maintaining a Turnpike Road from Anniesland Toll Bar to Saint Georges Road, and Branch Roads therewith connected, all in the County of Lanark. (Repealed by Anniesland Turnpike and St. George's Road Act 1839 (2 & 3 Vict. c. lxxxii))

=== Private acts ===
Short title	Citation	Royal assent
Long title
Hardwick Inclosure Act 1836	6 & 7 Will. 4. c. 1 Pr.	18 March 1836
An Act for inclosing Lands in the Parish of Hardwick in the County of Cambridge.
Wooton Inclosure Act 1836	6 & 7 Will. 4. c. 2 Pr.	30 March 1836
An Act for inclosing Lands in the Parish of Wooton in the County of Bedford.
Orwell Inclosure Act 1836	6 & 7 Will. 4. c. 3 Pr.	30 March 1836
An Act for inclosing Lands in the Parish of Orwell in the County of Cambridge, and for commuting the Tithes of the said Parish.
North Runcton Inclosure Act 1836	6 & 7 Will. 4. c. 4 Pr.	19 May 1836
An Act for inclosing Lands in the Parish of North Runcton in the County of Norfolk.
Alveston and Olveston (Gloucestershire) Inclosure Act 1836	6 & 7 Will. 4. c. 5 Pr.	19 May 1836
An Act for inclosing Lands in the Parish of Alveston in the County of Gloucester. and in the Tithing of Tockington Upper in the Parish of Olveston in the same County.
Alstonefield Inclosure Act 1836	6 & 7 Will. 4. c. 6 Pr.	19 May 1836
An Act to amend an Act passed in the Fourth Year of the Reign of His present Majesty, (Note: Alstonefield Inclosure Act 1834 (4 & 5 Will. 4. c. 15 Pr.)) for inclosing certain Lands within the Parish of Alstonefield in the County of Stafford.
Godmanstone Inclosure Act 1836	6 & 7 Will. 4. c. 7 Pr.	19 May 1836
An Act for dividing, allotting, and inclosing Lands within the Parish and Manor of Godmanstone in the County of Dorset.
Stepingley Inclosure Act 1836	6 & 7 Will. 4. c. 8 Pr.	20 May 1836
An Act for inclosing and exonerating from Tithes Lands in the Parish of Stepingley in the County of Bedford.
Mackenzie's Estate Act 1836	6 & 7 Will. 4. c. 9 Pr.	7 June 1836
An Act for settling and securing certain Parts and Portions of the Lands and Estate of Delvine in the County of Perth to and in favour of Sir John Muir Mackenzie Baronet, and the Series of Heirs entitled to take by certain Deeds of Entail made by George Muir Esquire, and under the Conditions and Limitations contained therein; and for vesting in lieu thereof the Lands and Estate of Cassencarie and others lying in the Stewartry of Kirkcudbright and Counties of Dumfries and Wigton in the said Sir John Muir Mackenzie, and his Heirs and Assigns, in Fee Simple.
Gartside's Estate Act 1836	6 & 7 Will. 4. c. 10 Pr.	7 June 1836
An Act to authorize the Sale of One Fourth Part or Share of a certain Tenement and Farm called Limehurst, in the Parish of Ashton under Line in the County of Lancaster, late belonging to John Gartside of Hough in the Parish of Rochdale in the said County of Lancaster, Yeoman, deceased, and for laying out the Purchase Money in the Purchase of other Estates, to be settled to the same Uses.
South Petherton Inclosure Act 1836	6 & 7 Will. 4. c. 11 Pr.	7 June 1836
An Act for inclosing Lands within the Parish of South Petherton in the County of Somerset.
Earl of Moray's Estate Act 1836	6 & 7 Will. 4. c. 12 Pr.	21 June 1836
An Act to enable Francis Earl of Moray to borrow a certain Sum of Money upon the Security of certain of his Entailed Estates, for Repayment to him of a Portion of the Monies laid out by him in the Improvement of these Estates.
White's Estate Act 1836	6 & 7 Will. 4. c. 13 Pr.	21 June 1836
An Act to enable the Reverend James White and the Persons for the Time being entitled to certain Estates situate in the Parish of Bonchurch in the Isle of Wight in the County of Southampton, devised by the Will of Charles Fitzmaurice Hill Esquire, deceased, to grant Building Leases.
Lockhart's Estate Act 1836	6 & 7 Will. 4. c. 14 Pr.	4 July 1836
An Act to amend an Act passed in the Third Year of the Reign of His late Majesty, (Note: Lockhart's Estate Act 1822 (3 Geo. 4. c. 12 Pr.)) for vesting the Lands and Barony of Dryden, and certain other Entailed Estates of Sir Charles Macdonald Lockhart Baronet, in Trustees, to be sold, and for laying out the Prices thereof in the Purchase of other Lands and Estates more conveniently situated, to be entailed in a similar Manner; to regulate the Manner of holding the said Estates; and to grant Powers of feuing to the Heirs of Entail.
Milliken Estate Act 1836	6 & 7 Will. 4. c. 15 Pr.	4 July 1836
An Act to vest a Part of the Entailed Estate of Milliken in the County of Renfrew in Trustees, to sell the same, and apply the Price thereof, or the Securities to be granted thereon, towards satisfying the Debts affecting the said Entailed Estate, and the Debt contracted for Money laid out in the Improvement of the same.
Marsh Baldon and Toot Baldon (Oxfordshire) Inclosure Act 1836	6 & 7 Will. 4. c. 16 Pr.	4 July 1836
An Act for dividing, allotting, and laying in Severalty Lands in the Parishes of Marsh Baldon and Toot Baldon in the County of Oxford.
Bowlder's Blue Coat School's Estate Act 1836	6 & 7 Will. 4. c. 17 Pr.	4 July 1836
An Act to enable the Trustees of Bowdler's Blue Coat School in Shrewsbury to effect a Sale to John Jones Esquire of Estates called Trefnant and Llanerchrochwell in the Parish of Guilsfield in the County of Montgomery.
Earl of Abergavenny's Estate Act 1836	6 & 7 Will. 4. c. 18 Pr.	4 July 1836
An Act to enable the granting of Leases of certain Parts of the Estates and Hereditaments of which the Right Honourable Henry Nevill Earl of Abergavenny is seised as Tenant in Tail Male under an Act passed in the Second and Third Years of the Reign of King Philip and Queen Mary, (Note: Restitution of Sir Edward Nevill's Heirs Act 1555 (2 & 3 Ph. & M. c. 2 Pr.)) and under the Limitations in the Will of George Lord Abergavenny in the said Act of Philip and Mary mentioned.
James Bradshaw's and Others' Estate Act 1836	6 & 7 Will. 4. c. 19 Pr.	4 July 1836
An Act for enabling James Edward Bradshaw Esquire and others to grant Leases of certain Estates in the County Palatine of Lancaster, devised by the Will of John Bradshaw Esquire, deceased.
Thring's Estate Act 1836	6 & 7 Will. 4. c. 20 Pr.	4 July 1836
An Act for consolidating the Rectories of Alford and Hornblotton in the County of Somerset, and for settling the Advowson of such consolidated Rectory; and also for rectifying a Settlement made in pursuance of the Will of the late John Thring Esquire, under the Direction of the High Court of Chancery, of Estates in the County of Somerset; and for other Purposes.
Etwall Hospital and Repton Free School (Derbyshire) Estates Act 1836	6 & 7 Will. 4. c. 21 Pr.	4 July 1836
An Act for empowering the Governors and Corporation of Etwall Hospital and Repton Free School in the County of Derby to sell certain Parts of their Estates in the same County, and to lay out the Monies arising from the Sale thereof in the Purchase of other Estates, to be conveyed to the same Uses.
John and Arabella Walker Heneage's Estate Act 1836	6 & 7 Will. 4. c. 22 Pr.	4 July 1836
An Act for authorizing the Sale of a Part of the Estates devised by the Wills of John Walker Heneage Esquire and Arabella Walker Heneage, and for investing the Produce in the Purchase of other Estates, to be settled to the same Uses.
Courtown's Estate Act 1836	6 & 7 Will. 4. c. 23 Pr.	4 July 1836
An Act for enabling the Earl of Courtown and the Trustees of his Marriage Settlement to grant Building Leases of Part of his Settled Estates in Ireland.
Christ's Hospital Estate Act 1836	6 & 7 Will. 4. c. 24 Pr.	14 July 1836
An Act for confirming a certain Lease granted by the Mayor and Commonalty and Citizens of the City of London, Governors of the Possessions, Revenues, and Goods of the Hospital of King Edward the Sixth, called Christ's Hospital, and for extending the Powers to grant Building Leases given to them by an Act passed in the Sixth Year of the Reign of King George the Fourth. (Note: Christ's Hospital Estate Act 1825 (6 Geo. 4. c. 48 Pr.))
George Heriot's Hospital Act 1836	6 & 7 Will. 4. c. 25 Pr.	14 July 1836
An Act to explain and extend the Powers of the Governors of the Hospital in Edinburgh, founded by George Heriot, Jeweller to King James the Sixth.
Bernhardt's Discovery Act 1836	6 & 7 Will. 4. c. 26 Pr.	28 July 1836
An Act for enabling Franz Anton Bernhardt to assign to a Company, and for enabling them to purchase and carry into effect the Purposes of a Patent granted to him for warming and ventilating Buildings; and for other Purposes.
Skibo Estate Act 1836	6 & 7 Will. 4. c. 27 Pr.	28 July 1836
An Act to vest Part of the Entailed Estate of Skibo and others in the County of Sutherland in Trustees in Fee Simple, for Sale, and to raise a further Sum of Money by Loan, for the several Purposes therein mentioned.
Ogilvy's Estate Act 1836	6 & 7 Will. 4. c. 28 Pr.	28 July 1836
An Act to enable Sir John Ogilvy Baronet, and the Heirs of Entail succeeding to him in the Estate of Cairnie and others, lying in the County of Forfar, to grant Feus of certain Parts thereof.
Pownall's Estate Act 1836	6 & 7 Will. 4. c. 29 Pr.	28 July 1836
An Act for enlarging the Powers of an Act passed in the Fifty-ninth Year of the Reign of His Majesty King George the Third, intituled "An Act for vesting the Estates devised by the Will of Hannah Pownall Widow, deceased, situate in the County if York, in Trustees, for Sale, and for investing the Purchase Money in the Purchase of other Estates to be settled to the former Uses;" (Note: Hannah Pownall's Estate Act 1819 (59 Geo. 3. c. 42 Pr.)) and for authorizing the rebuilding of certain Mills on the said devised Estates, called Copley Mills, out of the Monies to arise from such Sales, and out of Monies to be raised by Mortgage of the said devised Estates remaining unsold.
Dudley Vicarage Estate Act 1836	6 & 7 Will. 4. c. 30 Pr.	28 July 1836
An Act for authorizing a Sale of Glebe Lands belonging to the Vicarage of Dudley in the County of Worcester, and for other Purposes.
Glassford's Estate Act 1836	6 & 7 Will. 4. c. 31 Pr.	28 July 1836
An Act for vesting certain detached Parts of the Lands and Estate of Dougalston and others, situated in the Counties of Stirling and Dumbarton, which were entailed by John Glassford of Dougalston Esquire, deceased, in Trustees, to be sold for the Purpose of paying Debts and Charges affecting the Entailed Estate and of purchasing other Lands contiguous and convenient thereto.
Chadwick's Estate Act 1836	6 & 7 Will. 4. c. 32 Pr.	28 July 1836
An Act to authorize Grants and long Leases for Building Purposes of an Estate in the Parish of Rochdale in the County of Lancaster, being Part of the Settled Estates of the late Charles Chadwick Esquire.
Manor of Stoke Prior (Worcestershire) Act 1836	6 & 7 Will. 4. c. 33 Pr.	13 August 1836
An Act for rendering effectual an Agreement entered into by the Dean and Chapter of Worcester for enfranchising certain Lands and Hereditaments situate in the Parish of Stoke Prior in the County of Worcester, and Parcel of the Manor of Stoke Prior; and for other Purposes.
Horton's Estate Act 1836	6 & 7 Will. 4. c. 34 Pr.	13 August 1836
An Act for removing Doubts from the Title of Devisees under the Will of Eusebius Horton Esquire, deceased.
Lord Langford's Estate Act 1836	6 & 7 Will. 4. c. 35 Pr.	17 August 1836
An Act for enabling the Right Honourable Louisa Augusta Baroness Langford to release her Husband the Right Honourable Hercules Langford Baron Langford, and his Estates in the County of Meath in Ireland, from a certain Annuity or yearly Rent-charge thereon.
Tchitchagoff's Naturalization Act 1836 (Note: This act was not printed by the King's Printer.)	6 & 7 Will. 4. c. 36 Pr.	4 March 1836
An Act for naturalizing His Excellency Admiral Paul Tchitchagoff and Catherine Tchitchagoff his Daughter.
Steiner's Naturalization Act 1836	6 & 7 Will. 4. c. 37 Pr.	18 March 1836
An Act for naturalizing Frederick Steiner.
Ring's Naturalization Act 1836	6 & 7 Will. 4. c. 38 Pr.	30 March 1836
An Act for naturalizing Nicholas Ring.
Darthez's Naturalization Act 1836	6 & 7 Will. 4. c. 39 Pr.	30 March 1836
An Act for naturalizing John Peter Darthez the younger.
Michaelis's Naturalization Act 1836	6 & 7 Will. 4. c. 40 Pr.	30 March 1836
An Act for naturalizing Bemhard Michaelis.
Focke's Naturalization Act 1836	6 & 7 Will. 4. c. 41 Pr.	22 April 1836
An Act for naturalizing Julius Focke.
Hicks's Name Act 1836	6 & 7 Will. 4. c. 42 Pr.	19 May 1836
An Act to enable Edward Hicks Gentleman to use and bear the Surname and Arms of Hicks, in compliance with the Will of the Reverend James Hicks, deceased.
Hodges's Divorce Act 1836	6 & 7 Will. 4. c. 43 Pr.	19 May 1836
An Act to dissolve the Marriage of Edward Hodges Esquire with Clara Rebecca his now Wife, and to enable him to marry again; and for other Purposes.
Abbotsley Inclosure Act 1836	6 & 7 Will. 4. c. 44 Pr.	19 May 1836
An Act for inclosing and exonerating from Tithes Lands in the Parish of Abbotsley in the County of Huntingdon.
Liebrich's &c. Naturalization Act 1836	6 & 7 Will. 4. c. 45 Pr.	19 May 1836
An Act for naturalizing James Liebreich, Herrman Julius Marcus, Edward Wurtzburg, and Lewis Heymann.
Steinkeller's Naturalization Act 1836	6 & 7 Will. 4. c. 46 Pr.	19 May 1836
An Act for naturalizing Peter Anthony Steinkeller.
Claremont's Naturalization Act 1836	6 & 7 Will. 4. c. 47 Pr.	7 June 1836
An Act for naturalizing Edward Stopford Claremont.
Rée's Naturalization Act 1836	6 & 7 Will. 4. c. 48 Pr.	14 July 1836
An Act for naturalizing Hermann Philipp Rée.
Reiss's Naturalization Act 1836	6 & 7 Will. 4. c. 49 Pr.	14 July 1836
An Act for naturalizing Leopold Reiss.
Sonchay's Naturalization Act 1836	6 & 7 Will. 4. c. 50 Pr.	14 July 1836
An Act for naturalizing Johann Daniel Sonchay.
Schmidt's Naturalization Act 1836	6 & 7 Will. 4. c. 51 Pr.	14 July 1836
An Act for naturalizing Johann Jacob Schmidt.
Pilkington's Name Act 1836	6 & 7 Will. 4. c. 52 Pr.	28 July 1836
An Act to authorize Dame Mary, the Wife of Sir William Pilkington, Baronet, to bear the Surnames of Milborne and Swinnerton jointly with the Surname of Pilkington, and to be called by the Surnames of Milborne Swinnerton Pilkington, and for authorizing the said Sir William Pilkington and Dame Mary, his Wife, to bear or quarter the Arms of Swinnerton, of Butterton, and Milborne, and also for authorizing the second Son of the said Sir William Pilkington and Dame Mary, his Wife, and his Issue, to assume and bear the Surnames of Milborne Swinnerton in lieu of the Surname of Pilkington, and to bear or quarter the said Arms of Swinnerton, of Butterton and Milborne, in compliance with a condition contained in the Will of Thomas Swinnerton, Esquire, deceased.
Baron de Thoren's Naturalization Act 1836	6 & 7 Will. 4. c. 53 Pr.	28 July 1836
An Act for naturalizing Oscar Joseph de Satze Baron de Thoren.

=== Sources ===
- The Statutes of the United Kingdom of Great Britain and Ireland, 6 & 7 William IV. 1836. 1836 – via Internet Archive.
- The Statutes of the United Kingdom of Great Britain and Ireland, 6 & 7 William IV. 1836. 1836 – via Google Books.
- A Collection of the Public General Statutes passed in the Sixth and Seventh Year of the reign of His Majesty King William the Fourth. London: Eyre and Spottiswoode. 1836 – via Internet Archive.
- Journal of the House of Commons. Vol. 91. London: His Majesty's Stationery Office. pp. 3–843 – via Google Books.
- Journal of the House of Commons (PDF). Vol. 91. London: His Majesty's Stationery Office. pp. 3–843 – via parliament.uk.
- Chronological Table of and Index to the Statutes. Vol. 1: To the End of the Session 59 Vict. Sess. 2 (1895) (13th ed.). London: Her Majesty's Stationery Office. 1896. pp. 281–287 – via Google Books.

== See also ==
- List of acts of the Parliament of the United Kingdom
