= Constabulary (Ireland) Act 1836 =

Act of the Parliament of the United Kingdom

Constabulary (Ireland) Act 1836 (Note: The citation of this act by this short title was authorised by section 1 of, and the first schedule to, the Short Titles Act 1896. Due to the repeal of those provisions it is now authorised by section 19(2) of the Interpretation Act 1978.)
- Act of Parliament
- Parliament of the United Kingdom
- Long title: An Act to consolidate the Laws relating to the Constabulary Force in Ireland.
- Citation: 6 & 7 Will. 4. c. 13
- Territorial extent: United Kingdom

Dates
- Royal assent: 20 May 1836
- Commencement: 20 May 1836 (Note: Section 1.)
- Repealed: 9 February 1999 (Note: The Police (1998 Act) (Commencement No. 2) Order (Northern Ireland) 1999 (SI 1999/48).)
Other legislation
Amends	See § Repealed enactments
Repeals/revokes	See § Repealed enactments
Amended by	Constabulary (Ireland) Act 1851; Representation of the People Act 1948; Judicature (Northern Ireland) Act 1978; Statute Law Revision (Northern Ireland) Act 1980
Repealed by	Police (Northern Ireland) Act 1998

Status: Repealed

Text of statute as originally enacted

The Constabulary (Ireland) Act 1836 (6 & 7 Will. 4. c. 13) was an act of the Parliament of the United Kingdom that consolidated enactments related to the Royal Irish Constabulary.

== Provisions ==
=== Repealed enactments ===
Section 1 of the act repealed 8 enactments, listed in that section.

Citation	Short title	Description	Extent of repeal
54 Geo. 3. c. 131	Appointment of Superintending Magistrates, etc. Act 1814	An Act passed in the Fifty-fourth Year of the Reign of His late Majesty King George the Third, intituled An Act to provide for the better Execution of the Laws in Ireland by appointing superintending Magistrates and additional Constables in certain Cases.	Except so far as the said Act enables the Lord Lieutenant to change the Districts for holding Civil Bill Courts in Counties.
55 Geo. 3. c. 13	Superintending Magistrates, etc. (Ireland) Act 1814	An Act passed in the Fifty-fifth Year of the Reign of His said late Majesty King George the Third, to amend the said Act.	The whole act.
55 Geo. 3. c. 158	Conveyance of Prisoners (Ireland) Act 1815	Another Act passed in the Fifty-fifth Year of His said late Majesty, intituled An Act to enable Grand Juries to present additional Sumsfor Constables in Ireland, andfor the secure Conveyance of Prisoners.	Except so much of the said last-mentioned Act as relates to the Expences of removing transported Felons, and of the conveying Persons charged with Treason or Felony to Gaol.
57 Geo. 3. c. 22	Superintending Magistrates, etc. (Ireland) Act 1817	An Act passed in the Fifty-seventh Year of the Reign of His said late Majesty, to amend the said Two first-mentioned Acts of the Fifty-fourth and Fifty-fifth Years of His said late Majesty's Reign	The whole act.
59 Geo. 3. c. 92	Conveyance of Offenders (Ireland) Act 1819	An Act passed in the Fifty- ninth Year of the Reign of His said late Majesty King George the Third, intituled An Act to enable Justices of the Peace in Ireland to act as such in certain Cases out of the Limits of the Counties in which they actually are ; to make Provision for the Execution ofWarrants of Distress granted by them, and to authorize them to impose Fines upon Constables and other Officers for Neglect ofDuty, and on Masters for Ill-usage of their Apprentices.	As enables Justices to impose Fines upon Constables.
3 Geo. 4. c. 103	Appointment of Constables, etc. (Ireland) Act 1822	An Act passed in the Third Year of the Reign of His late Majesty King George the Fourth, intituled An Act for the Appointment of Constables, and to secure the effectual Performance of the Duties of their Office, and for the Appointment of Magistrates, in Ireland, in certain Cases.	The whole act.
5 Geo. 4. c. 28	Constables (Ireland) Act 1824	An Act passed in the Fifth Year of the Reign of His said late MajestyKing George the Fourth, intituled An Act to amend an Act of the Third Year of His present Majesty's Reign, for the Appointment of Constables in Ireland.	The whole act.
9 Geo. 4. c. 63	Constables (Ireland) Act 1828	An Act passed in the Ninth Year of the Reign of His said late Majesty King George the Fourth, intituled An Act to amend Two Acts of the Third and Fifth Years of His present Majesty, for the Appointment of Constables in Ireland.	The whole act.

== Subsequent developments ==
The whole act was repealed by section 74(6) of, and schedule 6 to, the Police (Northern Ireland) Act 1998, which came into force on 9 February 1999.
