= Statute Law Revision Act 1874 =

Act of the Parliament of the United Kingdom

Statute Law Revision Act 1874 (Note: Section 3.)
- Act of Parliament
- Parliament of the United Kingdom
- Long title: An Act for promoting the Revision of the Statute Law by repealing certain Acts which have ceased to be in force or have become unnecessary.
- Citation: 37 & 38 Vict. c. 35
- Introduced by: Richard Baggallay MP (Commons); Hugh Cairns, 1st Baron Cairns (Lords)
- Territorial extent: United Kingdom

Dates
- Royal assent: 16 July 1874
- Commencement: 16 July 1874 (Note: The Acts of Parliament (Commencement) Act 1793.)
Other legislation
Amends	Statute Law Revision Act 1873; See § Repealed enactments
Repeals/revokes	See § Repealed enactments
Amended by	Statute Law Revision Act 1874 (No. 2); Statute Law Revision Act 1894
Relates to	Solicitors Act 1843; Repeal of Obsolete Statutes Act 1856; See Statute Law Revision Act

Status: Partially repealed

Text of statute as originally enacted

The Statute Law Revision Act 1874 (37 & 38 Vict. c. 35) is an act of the Parliament of the United Kingdom that repealed for the United Kingdom enactments from 1801 to 1837 which had ceased to be in force or had become necessary. The act was intended, in particular, to facilitate the preparation of the revised edition of the statutes, then in progress.

Section 2 of the Statute Law Revision Act 1874 (No. 2) (37 & 38 Vict. c. 96) provided that the act was to be read and construed as if, in the entry in the Schedule to this act relating to the Piracy Act 1837 (7 Will. 4 & 1 Vict. c. 88), the words "Section Six" and "Section Seven" had been substituted for the words "Section Four" and "Section Five" respectively.

As of 2026, the act remains partly in force in the United Kingdom.

== Background ==
In the United Kingdom, acts of Parliament remain in force until expressly repealed. Blackstone's Commentaries on the Laws of England, published in the late 18th-century, raised questions about the system and structure of the common law and the poor drafting and disorder of the existing statute book.

From 1810 to 1825, The Statutes of the Realm was published, providing the first authoritative collection of acts. The first statute law revision act was not passed until 1856 with the Repeal of Obsolete Statutes Act 1856 (19 & 20 Vict. c. 64). This approach — focusing on removing obsolete laws from the statute book followed by consolidation — was proposed by Peter Locke King MP, who had been highly critical of previous commissions' approaches, expenditures, and lack of results.

Previous statute law revision acts
Year passed	Title	Citation	Effect
1861	Statute Law Revision Act 1861	24 & 25 Vict. c. 101	Repealed or amended over 800 enactments
1863	Statute Law Revision Act 1863	26 & 27 Vict. c. 125	Repealed or amended over 1,600 enactments for England and Wales
1867	Statute Law Revision Act 1867	30 & 31 Vict. c. 59	Repealed or amended over 1,380 enactments
1870	Statute Law Revision Act 1870	33 & 34 Vict. c. 69	Repealed or amended over 250 enactments
1871	Promissory Oaths Act 1871	34 & 35 Vict. c. 48	Repealed or amended almost 200 enactments
1871	Statute Law Revision Act 1871	34 & 35 Vict. c. 116	Repealed or amended over 1,060 enactments
1872	Statute Law Revision Act 1872	35 & 36 Vict. c. 63	Repealed or amended almost 490 enactments
1872	Statute Law (Ireland) Revision Act 1872	35 & 36 Vict. c. 98	Repealed or amended over 1,050 enactments
1872	Statute Law Revision Act 1872 (No. 2)	35 & 36 Vict. c. 97	Repealed or amended almost 260 enactments
1873	Statute Law Revision Act 1873	36 & 37 Vict. c. 91	Repealed or amended 1,225 enactments

== Passage ==
The Statute Law Revision Bill had its first reading in the House of Lords on 21 May 1874, introduced by the Lord Chancellor, Hugh Cairns, 1st Baron Cairns. The bill had its second reading in the House of Lords on 15 June 1874 and was committed to a committee of the whole house, which met on 16 June 1874 and reported on 18 June 1874, with amendments. The bill had its third reading in the House of Lords on 18 June 1874 and passed, with amendments.

The bill its first reading in the House of Commons on 22 June 1874, introduced by the Attorney General, Richard Baggallay MP. The bill had its second reading in the House of Commons on 29 June 1874 and was committed to a committee of the whole house, which met and reported on 2 July 1874, without amendments. The bill had its third reading in the House of Commons on 3 July 1874 and passed, without amendments.

The bill was granted royal assent on 16 July 1874.

== Subsequent developments ==
The act was intended, in particular, to facilitate the preparation of a revised edition of the statutes.

Section 2 of, and the schedule to, the act was repealed by section 1 of, and the first schedule to, the Statute Law Revision Act 1894 (57 & 58 Vict. c. 54), which came into force on 25 August 1894.

The enactments which were repealed (whether for the whole or any part of the United Kingdom) by the act were repealed so far as they extended to the Isle of Man by section 1(1) of, and schedule 1 to, the Statute Law Revision (Isle of Man) Act 1991, which came into force on 25 July 1991.

The act was retained for the Republic of Ireland by section 2(2)(a) of, and part 4 of schedule 1 to, the Statute Law Revision Act 2007, which came into force on 8 May 2007.

== Repealed enactments ==
Section 1 of the act repealed 492 enactments, listed in the schedule to the act, across six categories: (Note: The Note of the bill, unlike the schedule, gives commentary on each act, noting any earlier repeals and the reason for the new repeal.)

- Expired
- Spent
- Repealed in general terms
- Virtually repealed
- Superseded
- Obsolete

Section 1 of the act included several safeguards to ensure that the repeal does not negatively affect existing rights or ongoing legal matters. Specifically, any legal rights, privileges, or remedies already obtained under the repealed laws, as well as any legal proceedings or principles established by them, remain unaffected. Section 1 of the act also ensured that repealed enactments that have been incorporated into other laws would continue to have legal effect in those contexts. Moreover, the repeal would not revive any former rights, offices, or jurisdictions that had already been abolished.

Section 2 of the act provided that the Criminal Costs (Dublin) Act 1815 (55 Geo. 3. c. 91), which had been repealed by the Statute Law Revision Act 1873, was revived, so far as it related to the county of the city of Dublin.

== See also ==
- Statute Law Revision Act
