= Canopy Housing =

UK housing organisation

Canopy Housing are a self-help housing organisation based in Leeds, UK. They were winners of the UN World Habitat Award 2015/16 in partnership with Giroscope. Canopy renovate empty properties with volunteers and homeless people, who become their tenants after creating good quality affordable homes for themselves. They bring derelict property back into use, house homeless families, train unemployed people in construction skills, create jobs, improve community cohesion and contribute to the regeneration of disadvantaged neighbourhoods. They now manage more than 80 properties, more than a third of which they own.

== Community ==
Empty properties are well recognised as an issue nationally, particularly in urban areas, and fall under the remit of the Empty Homes Agency. This national body supports local responses such as Canopy's. It appreciates that the project's community focus and small size enable Canopy to retrofit the properties, maintain lengthy tenancies and respond to anti social behaviour and maintenance problems quickly, all of which contribute to improving the quality of the local environment for all residents living in the area. Many of the derelict properties they renovate have been standing empty for years. Empty homes can blight an area and become sites for vandalism and rubbish dumping. In 2019 there were around 6,500 properties in Leeds that had been empty for more than six months.

== Funding and partnership ==
Most of Canopy's homes are Victorian or Edwardian terraced houses. The first fifty they acquired were leased, predominantly from Leeds City Council on peppercorn rents. The Empty Homes Programme, which ran from 2013-2016, allowed them to start buying their own homes then when the programme closed Leeds City Council stepped in, offering capital grants to Canopy funded by the sale of council homes under right-to-buy legislation.

In 2019, Leeds City Council extended the leases on most of its properties to 99 years enabling Canopy to increase its borrowing and acquire more homes for retrofit.

Rental income on the properties which have been improved provides around two thirds of Canopy's annual income, with the remainder coming from traditional charitable funding streams.

== Volunteers ==
Through the practical work involved in renovating a property, Canopy brings together many volunteers from the local community to learn skills, increase confidence, break down barriers and make big improvements to local neighbourhoods. Canopy volunteers come from different communities in the local area, including people from various age groups and with differing abilities. Canopy works hard to ensure that its services are accessible to people from different countries, for example by providing translated information on its services to potential volunteers. People from different backgrounds interact and have the opportunity to learn from each other’s experiences and skills. Practical jobs volunteers get involved in include light building work, kitchen installation, insulation, plastering, tiling, painting, decorating, carpeting and furniture assembly.

== Mission ==
Through their award-winning self-help model, they enable people to create decent affordable homes for themselves and their families. They provide volunteering opportunities, supporting and training their volunteers and tenants to help them move towards their life goals. They advise other groups keen to learn from their model, and seek to replicate their work in other areas, towns and cities.

== History ==
1996 Two local residents get together to address the problems of the large numbers of derelict and empty properties in the Burley Lodge area of Leeds. They want to get local people involved, particularly those who are young and disadvantaged, in the work and create self-help opportunities for homeless people to work to create decent homes for themselves.

1997 Planning takes shape and Canopy works with Leeds City Council and Leeds Federated Housing Association to access empty properties. Fundraising work begins to bear fruit and renovation work starts on the project base and resource centre at 66 Burley Lodge Road. Canopy starts work on its first house in October.

1998 Canopy takes legal form and is officially registered as “an industrial and provident society for the benefit of the community”. Volunteer involvement continues to grow and Canopy volunteers set up Hyde Park Source, working to renovate bin yards in Burley Lodge area.

1999 Work is completed on the project base with kitchen, workshop, office and meeting facilities. Canopy Apprenticeship Project scheme implemented.

2000 Development work starts for replicating Canopy’s work into the Beeston Hill area of South Leeds.

2001 The project in South Leeds gets started, called Beecan (Beeston Canopy) it starts work on the project resource centre at 114 Lady Pit Lane. The window box scheme is implemented throughout the Burley Lodge area.

2002 Canopy expands to commence a bin yard project in East End Park, over the next two years the project renovates 42 bin yards to create communal areas for residents. In Hyde Park our last house in the area is completed (20th) area and within months the first house in Beeston is started.

2004 Canopy begins to formally develop its work with the refugee and asylum community, providing housing and volunteer opportunities, amongst its existing diverse beneficiaries. Office space is shared with refugee community organisations.

2006 Canopy restructures and refocuses on the housing renovations and volunteer programme in Beeston, as well as starting to take on some properties in Holbeck.

2007 The project has worked with over 400 volunteers and completed a total of 36 property renovations. The volunteer programme is awarded the Investing in Volunteers standard.

2008 Canopy begins work in Harehills with the support of many local volunteers and organisations. East North East Homes Leeds supports Canopy with the provision of empty homes, the first of which is turned into a workshop and office with facilities for volunteers, tenants and local residents.

2009 Grants awarded in October–December enable the continuation of the work, but extra funding is still required to secure the staff team and other expenditure over the next five years.

2013 Canopy takes advantage of the Empty Homes Programme to purchase its first wholly owned property.

2016 Canopy wins the UN World Habitat in partnership with Giroscope.

2019 Leeds City Council extends the leases on 39 of the properties managed by Canopy to 99 years.
