= Co-operatives and Community Benefit Societies Act 2003 =

Act of the Parliament of the United Kingdom

Co-operatives and Community Benefit Societies Act 2003 (Note: Section 9(1).)
- Act of Parliament
- Parliament of the United Kingdom
- Long title: An Act to enable the law relating to co-operatives and community benefit societies registered under the Industrial and Provident Societies Act 1965 to be amended so as to bring it into conformity with certain aspects of the law relating to companies; to permit a registered society whose business is conducted for the benefit of the community to provide that its assets are dedicated permanently for that purpose; and for connected purposes.
- Citation: 2003 c. 15
- Territorial extent: England and Wales; Scotland (except section 5(8).); (Note: Section 9(2)–(3).)

Dates
- Royal assent: 10 July 2003
- Commencement: 10 July 2003 (sections 7–9); 20 October 2003 (sections 4–6) (Note: Section 7. The Co-operatives and Community Benefit Societies Act 2003 (Commencement No. 1) Order 2003 (SI 2003/2678).); 1 April 2004 (section 2 and 3); 13 December 2004 (section 1) (Note: Section 7. The Co-operatives and Community Benefit Societies Act 2003 (Commencement No. 2) Order 2004 (SI 2004/3257).)
- Repealed: 1 August 2014
Other legislation
| Amends | Industrial and Provident Societies Act 1965; Land Registration Act 2002 |
| Repealed by | Co-operative and Community Benefit Societies Act 2014 |

Status: Repealed

History of passage through Parliament

Text of statute as originally enacted

Revised text of statute as amended

The Co-operatives and Community Benefit Societies Act 2003 (c. 15) was an act of the Parliament of the United Kingdom.

== Provisions ==
The act allowed community benefit societies to implement safeguards for their assets in perpetuity. To use an asset lock under the legislation there had to be a membership vote of over 50% supporting the proposal, a board vote of over 75% supporting it, and a second vote at a general meeting to ratify it.

The act only affected community benefit societies and not cooperatives. It remained illegal for co-operatives to introduce asset locks after the 2003 act.

== Implementation ==
The regulations under the act came into force on 6 April 2006

== Subsequent developments ==
The whole act was repealed by section 154 of, and schedule 7 to, the Co-operative and Community Benefit Societies Act 2014, which came into force on 1 August 2014.

== See also ==
- Co-operative and Community Benefit Societies Act 2014
- Co-operative and Community Benefit Societies and Credit Unions Act 2010
- Industrial and provident society
