= Squatters' Action for Secure Homes =

Campaign group in the United Kingdom

- SQUASH
- Predecessor: SQUASH 1990s
- Formation: 2011
- Purpose: Housing activism
- Region served: UK
- Official language: English
- Website: squashcampaign.org

Squatters' Action for Secure Homes (SQUASH) is an activist group formed first in the 1990s in the United Kingdom to represent the interests of squatters and to fight the proposed criminalisation of squatting. It then reformed in 2011, when there were again parliamentary discussions about making squatting illegal. After squatting was (partially) criminalised in 2012, the group continues to monitor arrests and convictions. During its campaign against criminalisation, SQUASH gave a parliamentary briefing alongside the Advisory Service for Squatters, homelessness charity Crisis and the Empty Homes Agency.

== 1990s ==
In the 1990s, SQUASH was formed in London to represent the interests of squatters in the debates over the legislation which later became the Criminal Justice and Public Order Act 1994. Other groups included Justice? in Brighton.

== Reformed ==
When the Cameron–Clegg coalition moved to criminalise squatting in the early 2010s, the reformed SQUASH became a mouthpiece for squatters across the UK. Some participants were living at Grow Heathrow. It relaunched officially in May 2011. SQUASH gave a parliamentary briefing alongside the Advisory Service for Squatters, homelessness charity Crisis and the Empty Homes Agency.

A clause to criminalise squatting was then added to a bill with 6 days' notice and SQUASH organised a sleep-out when the bill was first voted upon in the House of Commons. The police declared it an illegal demonstration because it had not been applied for 7 days in advance and arrested 17 people. SQUASH then worked with John McDonnell to table an amendment to the proposed legislation.

The Ministry of Justice organised a consultation called Options for dealing with squatting and SQUASH encouraged squatters and supporters of squatting to respond. In total there were 2,217 responses of which 2,126 were against criminalisation. Of these, 1,990 came via SQUASH. There were 91 responses in favour of criminalisation. The Ministry of Justice announced it would take a "qualitative rather than a quantitative" approach to the responses and in October 2011 recommended the criminalisation of squatting in residential buildings.

In August 2012, SQUASH stated to the BBC that the number of people on local authority housing lists had almost doubled since 1997 to 5 million. They also reported that there were 650,000 empty properties across the country.

SQUASH released a report called Can We Afford to Criminalise Squatting? (2012) which claimed that the costs incurred by evicting all current squatters might exceed £790 million. The report suggested that the costs would far outweigh the £350 million in savings the Ministry of Justice was claiming would be saved.

== Criticisms ==
When squatting was threatened with criminalisation in the 1970s, the pro-squatting group CACTL (Campaign Against the Criminal Trespass Law) made powerful links with workers movements. Legal scholar Lucy Finchett-Maddock suggests SQUASH could have made better links with the contemporaneous student and Occupy movements.

Securitization scholar Mary Manjikian states that anarchist squatters criticised SQUASH for engaging with the Government's proposals rather than ignoring them.

== Post-criminalisation ==
Squatting in residential buildings was criminalised in England and Wales by the Legal Aid, Sentencing and Punishment of Offenders Act 2012. When the first jail sentences were handed down, SQUASH stated they were "deeply disproportionate and unjust."

In 2013, 35 year old homeless man Daniel Gauntlett froze to death in Kent outside an empty bungalow. He had been warned by police not to enter. SQUASH said criminalising squatting was “the nail in Daniel’s coffin”.

Six months after the criminalisation of squatting in residential buildings, SQUASH published its research into who was being arrested and why. It found there were 33 known arrests, which had led to 10 convictions and 3 jail sentences. None of these arrests involved squatters occupying homes in which people had been living, the problem which the law was supposed to be solving. A letter to the Guardian from barristers and solicitors supported SQUASH's call for the law to be repealed.

SQUASH published a report in 2015 (Squatting Statistics 2015) which stated that since criminalisation there had been 738 arrests, 326 prosecutions and 260 convictions.

== Selected works ==
- 2016: Squatting Statistics 2015 (Version 2.0)
- 2015: Squatting Statistics 2015
- 2015: Homes, Not Jails
- 2013: The Case Against Section 144
- 2012: Can We Afford To Criminalise Squatting?
- 2011: Criminalising the Vulnerable: Why we can’t criminalise our way out of a housing crisis
- 1994: A Crime to be Homeless
- 1994: Ordered Out: Public Order and Housing Chaos
