= Royal School for the Blind, Liverpool =

Oldest continuously operating school for the blind in the world

Coordinates: 53.3955°N 2.9164°W

The Royal School for the Blind in Liverpool, England, is the oldest specialist school of its kind in the UK, having been founded in 1791. Only the Institut National des Jeunes Aveugles in Paris is older, but the Royal School for the Blind is the oldest school in the world in continuous operation, and the first in the world founded by a blind person, Edward Rushton, who was also an anti-slavery campaigner. It was also the first school in the world to offer education and training to blind adults as well as children.

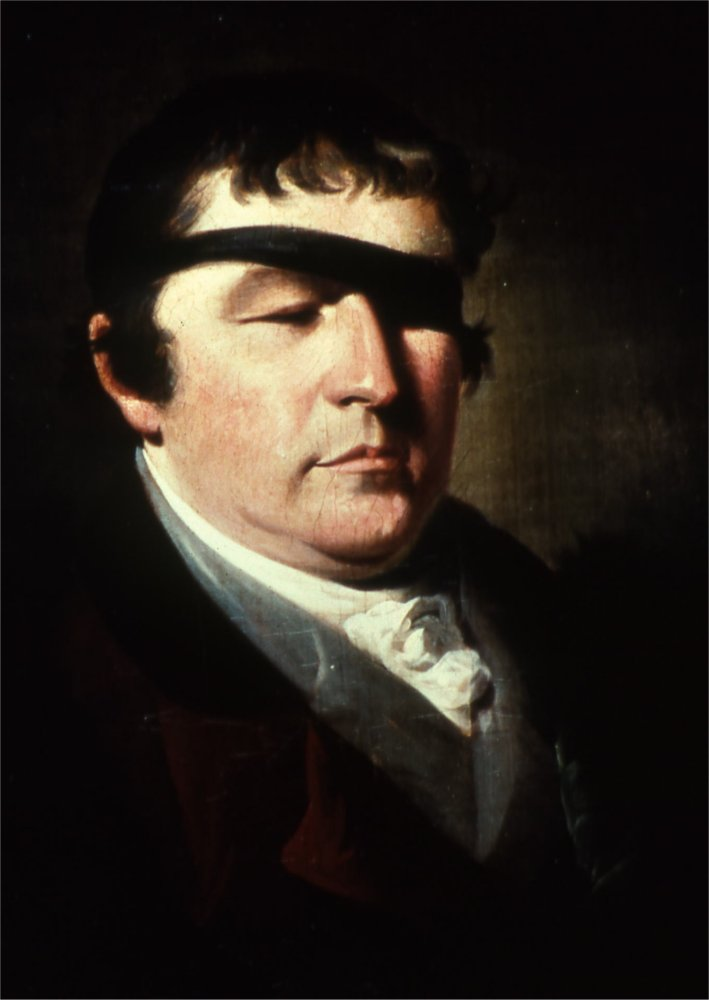
Edward Rushton

== Early history ==
Established as The Liverpool School for the Indigent Blind in 1791, the foundation of what is now the Royal School for the Blind, in Liverpool, England, is commonly attributed to Edward Rushton. However, some sources refer to a further seven co-founders, including the blind musician John Christie and William Roscoe.

The first building to be used by the school was quite unsuitable. Situated at 6 Commutation Row, Liverpool, opposite the potteries of Shaw's Brow (now William Brown Street), two recently erected houses were rented by the charity for the sole use of the school. They were much too small and by 1800 enough money had been raised to erect a purpose-built school nearby, on the site later occupied by the Odeon cinema on London Road. Designed by John Foster junior (later Architect & Surveyor to Liverpool Corporation) the school was now well established and would stay on this site for the next 50 years.

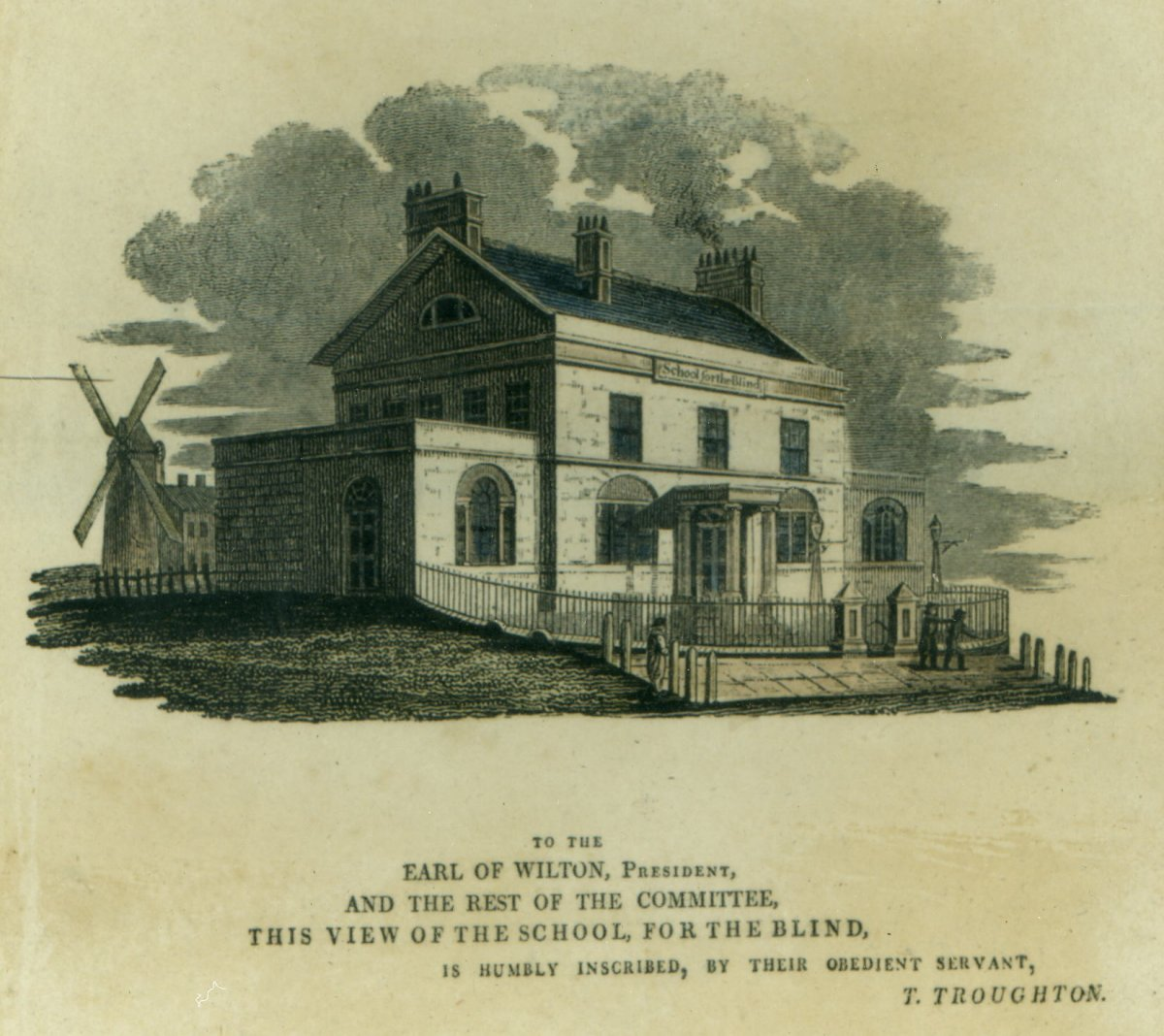
The new Blind School drawn in 1805

In 1806 during a royal visit to Liverpool by the Prince of Wales (later George IV) and the Duke of Clarence (later William IV), the royal entourage visited the school, where they met pupils and inspected some of the manufactured goods on show. After being entertained by the choir of the school singing the "Hallelujah Chorus", the Prince ordered 10 guineas to be distributed among the pupils and bestowed 100 guineas on the school and also his royal patronage, an interest that the British royal family has continued unbroken to the present day.

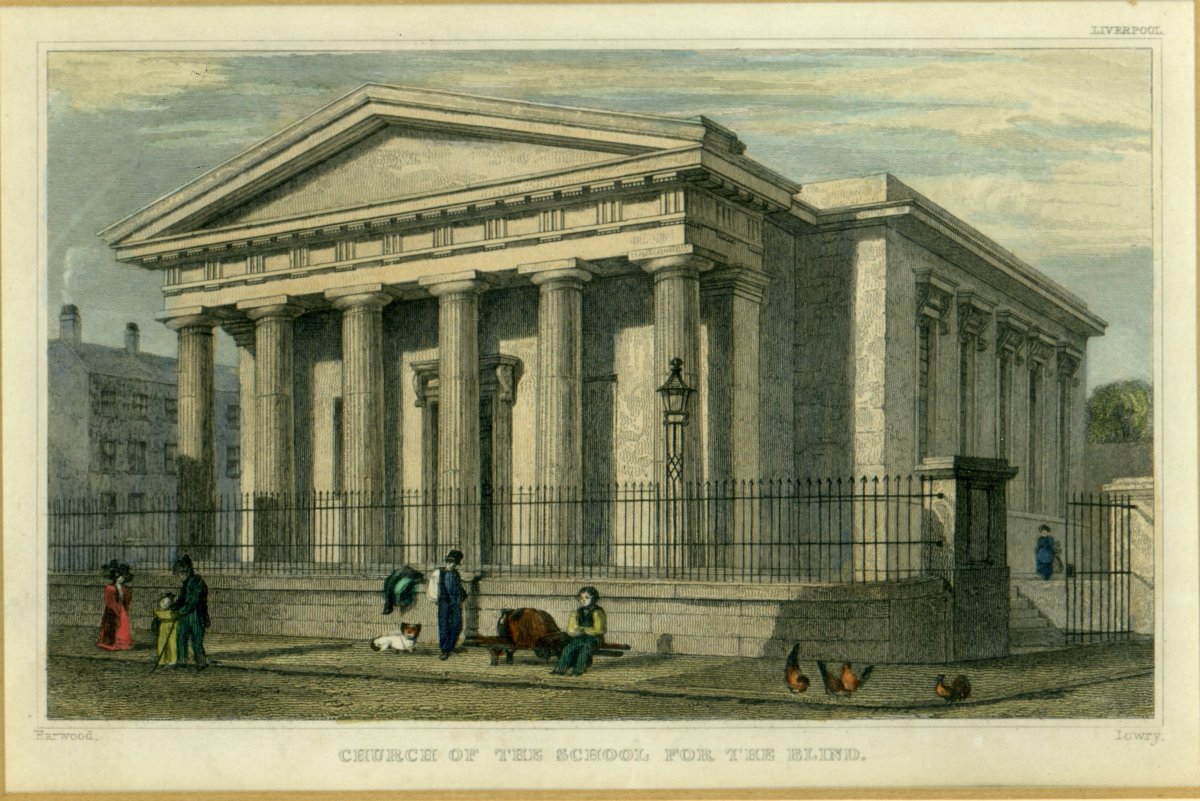
Chapel of the School for the Blind, Liverpool 1829

The gift was a great boost to the institution because it was raising funds to extend the site. Foster was again engaged as architect and land to the rear of the building was secured; building began on new facilities in 1807. Completed in 1812, 53 males and 18 females moved into the buildings, which were now fully residential, with work rooms, technical facilities and music rooms. The mission of the school guardians was that the institution would be "less of an asylum, where the ease a comfort of the blind were principally considered, and more approaching a school, where pupils could be instructed in some useful art or trade, by which they might be enabled to procure for themselves a comfortable livelihood."

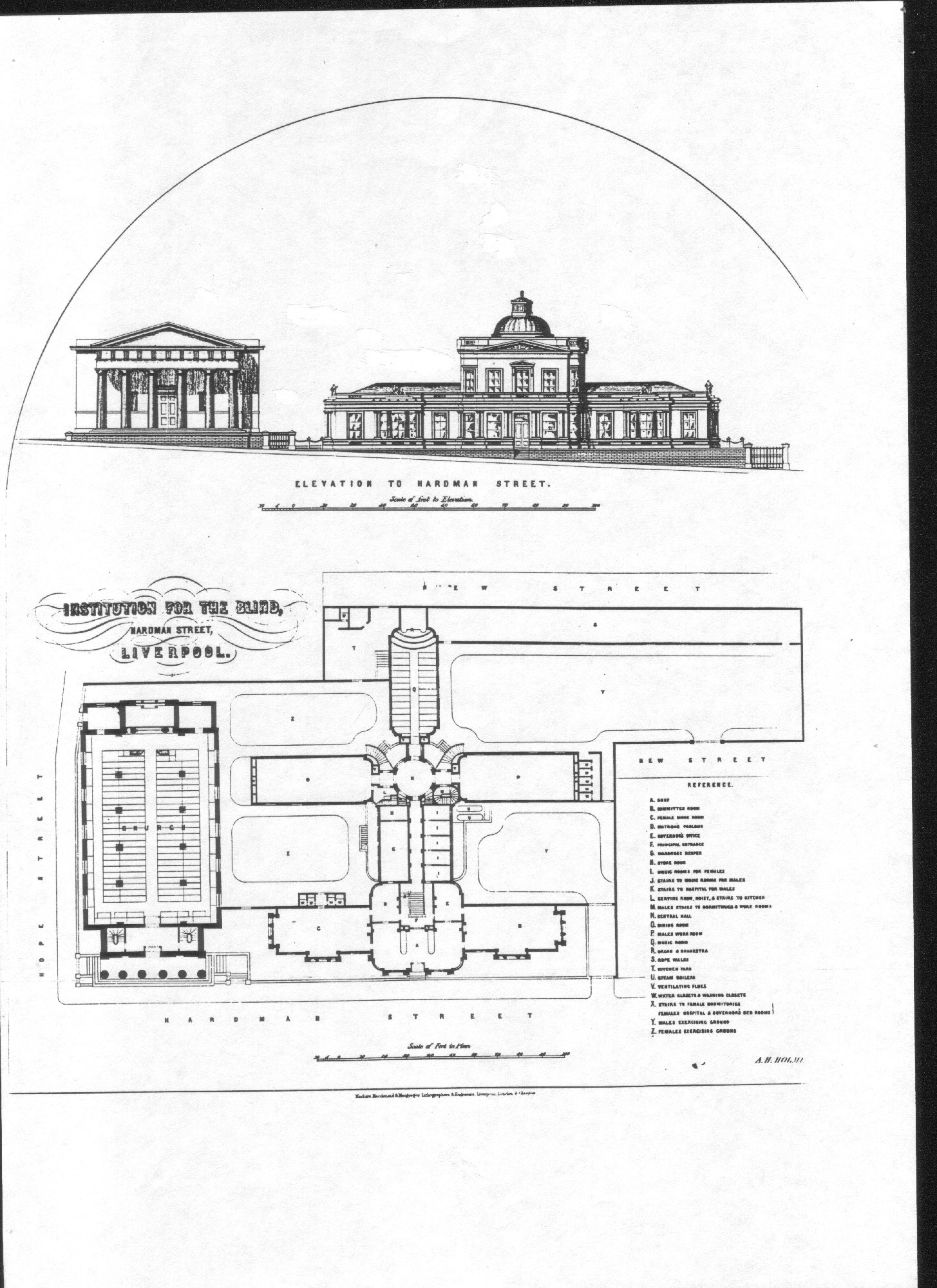
The Hardman Street School for the Blind, Liverpool 1851 and transferred Chapel

In 1819, a chapel was opened by the school on adjoining land, with a connecting tunnel for the pupils to avoid the road and traffic above. Foster was asked to draw up plans and, being fresh from a tour of Greece, the classical influence was captured in the Doric frontage to the building. This influence would be carried over into other local buildings during his career as the city architect.

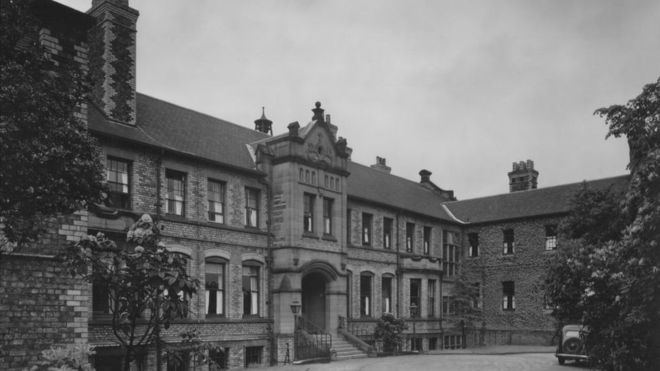
School for the Blind, Liverpool - Wavertree building opened 1898

As Lime Street Station began to expand at the height of Railway Mania, pressure was brought to bear on the owners of local properties to make way for it. The school guardians began to make plans to move once more. The London and North Western Railway agreed in 1849 to exchange land they held in Hope Street and Hardman Street, plus the sum of £9,500, in exchange for the entire estate adjoining Lime Street Station that was owned by the school. A further £2,000 was given to the school for the chapel land and removal of its structure. This was to entail the transfer of the chapel to the new site on the corner block of Hope Street and Hardman Street where it was re-erected in its entirety, apart from its front steps, for which the local council refused to grant the necessary space. The new school building, designed by Arthur Hill Holme, and erected alongside the chapel facing Hardman Street, opened in 1851, with 85 pupils.

With the passing of the Elementary Education (Blind and Deaf Children) Act 1893, the Hardman Street school could not provide the required facilities laid down by the new legislation. Thanks to Mary Louisa Hornby, who was a major benefactor, Wavertree Hall was purchased in Church Road, Wavertree, the original hall was demolished and the new school buildings opened in November 1898. Taking in children from the age of 5 to 16, they would then be transferred to the Hardman Street site for technical training.

== Early 20th century ==
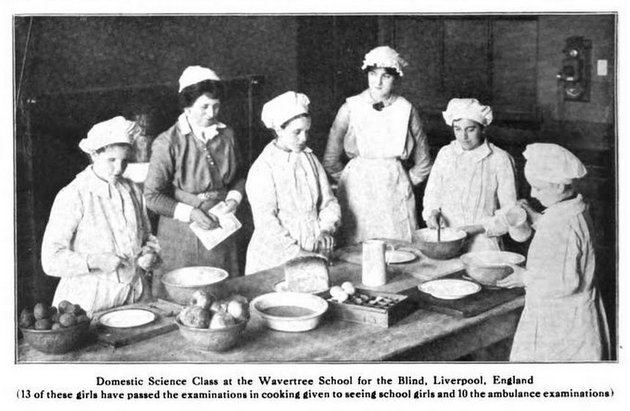
Wavertree School for the Blind students in 1917, in a cooking lesson.

Due to dwindling attendances and the chapel having no parish of its own, it was decided to close the building in 1930; it was demolished later that year. There was great debate over the fate of the Doric front but nothing came of the numerous suggestions. A new extension was opened in 1932 on the same site, designed by the architects Anthony Minoprio and Hugh Spencely, which provided additional work space, recreation rooms, offices and a sales shop for the goods manufactured by the students.

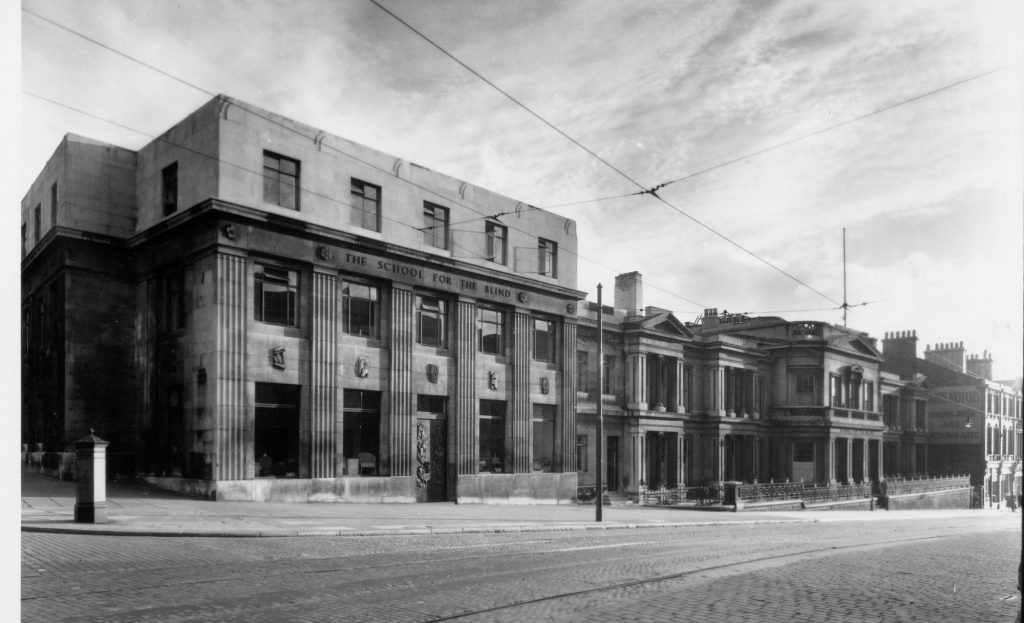
The Hardman Street School with the new extension built on the site of the demolished chapel 1932

During the Second World War, both the Wavertree and Hardman Street sites were evacuated with staff to Rhyl in North Wales, moving together on 1–2 September 1939. Four buildings were taken over: the former North Wales School for Blind Children in Russell Road; Clwyd Lodge next door; Northgate House and Penrhyn Lodge. The school returned to Liverpool in 1946. Part of the Hardman Street school was requisitioned by the Royal Air Force in the intervening period.

== Post-war and the Education Act 1944 ==
Following the changes introduced by the Education Act 1944, Wavertree became a school for mixed pupils aged 7–11, with Henshaw's School for the Blind in Manchester taking senior children. Those with academic promise were sent to Worcester College for Boys, Chorleywood College for Girls or the Royal Normal School, where pupils would generally stay until they were 18. The Hardman Street site became a technical college for the North West region for those aged 16 to 21. General academic education would continue, plus the provision of vocational training in basket-making, shoe repairing, brush-making, and hand-, flat- and round-machine knitting – all wholly inadequate in a modernising post war industrialised world where many blind people were now being employed under the terms of the Disabled Persons Employment Act 1944. The technical college failed to move with the times, which in turn led to a dwindling of its students and eventually to closure in 1957. The building was sold to Liverpool Corporation in 1959, who leased it to the city's police force for use as their headquarters until they moved to Canning Place in 1982. It has since served several purposes.

The Wavertree site continued under the headship of Derek Marks from 1960, who, keen for the school to modernise, quickly introduced the Perkins Brailler. With only two machines in the country, both owned by the Royal National Institute of Blind People, he placed an order for 60 with the bemused American manufacturers. Children were allowed to take them with them when they moved on to senior school. Additional buildings were added on site, together with a swimming pool in 1964 and the landscaping of the grounds, with its additional recreation areas. There was further expansion in 1966, when the Abbeyholme estate alongside the school was acquired, then in 1972 when Clifton House to the rear of the school facing Prince Alfred Road was purchased.

The school was moving into a successful phase under Marks and his staff, who were keen to introduce new ideas and revolutionary techniques where possible. However, more change was on the way, and as the effects of the Warnock Report took hold in the late 1970s the role of the school began to change. Under the Education Act 1976, and later the Education Act 1981, provision was made for blind and partially sighted children to be educated in mainstream schools, while Wavertree began to accept children with additional challenges. By 1983 the role of the school was extended to the:

education of physically handicapped children with severe learning difficulties, and other handicaps, between the ages of three and eighteen, who would not be catered for in their local schools.

The transition took time and was finally reached by August 1989.

In 1990, in tribute to over 40 years of commitment and dedication in the caring and education of children with special needs, Marks was awarded an OBE. The award was announced as he was celebrating thirty years as headmaster of the school.

== Bicentenary and royal visit ==
In 1989, historian Mike Royden was asked by the school to look at the school archive with a view to producing a history of the school in time for its bicentenary. The archive is extensive with volumes dating back to 1773, containing, for example, complete sets of Management Committee minute books and Annual Reports from 1793, Admissions Registers, medical reports, Visitors Reports, and Treasurers Reports. All were researched and indexed at this time. The subsequent history by Royden, Pioneers and Perseverance - A History of the Royal School for the Blind 1791-1991 - was published in 1991. A diary kept by the pupils during their evacuation to Rhyl was also discovered and included in the appendix.

The Bicentennial appeal fund was launched on 13 November 1990 with a target of £2.5 million to provide new facilities, including new classrooms, a hydrotherapy pool and residential facilities for parents.

During the research for the school's history, Royden discovered the fate of the Doric front of the chapel demolished in 1930. Six columns in triple sections, their capitals and plinths, were found lying in the undergrowth at Camphill in Woolton, where they had lain undisturbed for 60 years. Part of the new development at the school was a water garden for the pupils, and it was decided to bring back one of the column sections, plus its capital, and have it redesigned as a centrepiece water fountain. This was unveiled by Queen Elizabeth II on her visit to the school in 1991.

== 21st century ==
In 2011, the school was cited as one of the reasons (along with local blind charity Bradbury Fields) for UK supermarket Sainsbury's choice to use a store in nearby Woolton for its trial of Braille signage.

The Redwall series of books was first written for pupils at the school when its author Brian Jacques worked there as a delivery driver. From 2016, the History of Place project carried out archival research at the school, uncovering and making public documents including diaries of some of those who attended the school, as well as revealing aspects of its architectural heritage. The Museum of Liverpool held an exhibition featuring the history of the school in 2018.

Today, the Royal School for the Blind provides places for up to 66 pupils ranging in age from 2–19 years and beyond. All students have a visual impairment and multiple disabilities, including difficulties ranging from moderate to profound. The children are taught in small groups with a high staff ratio. All pupils have access to the (Early Years Foundation Stage) National Curriculum and a discrete 16-19 curriculum with an increased emphasis upon independent skills and vocational skills.

== Historical abuse allegations ==
In January 2017, allegations against a deceased former headmistress, Margaret McLenan, of historical physical and mental abuse were reported. She was in post in the 1950s. Susan George, president of the school when the allegations were made, said she was saddened by them.
