= Thomas Henshaw =

Thomas Henshaw may refer to:

- Thomas Henshaw (alchemist) (1618–1700), English lawyer, courtier, diplomat and scientific writer
- Thomas Henshaw (bishop) (1873–1938), Bishop of Salford
- Thomas Henshaw (benefactor) (1731–1810), English hatter and school benefactor
