= Anthony Minoprio =

British architect and town planner (1900–1988)

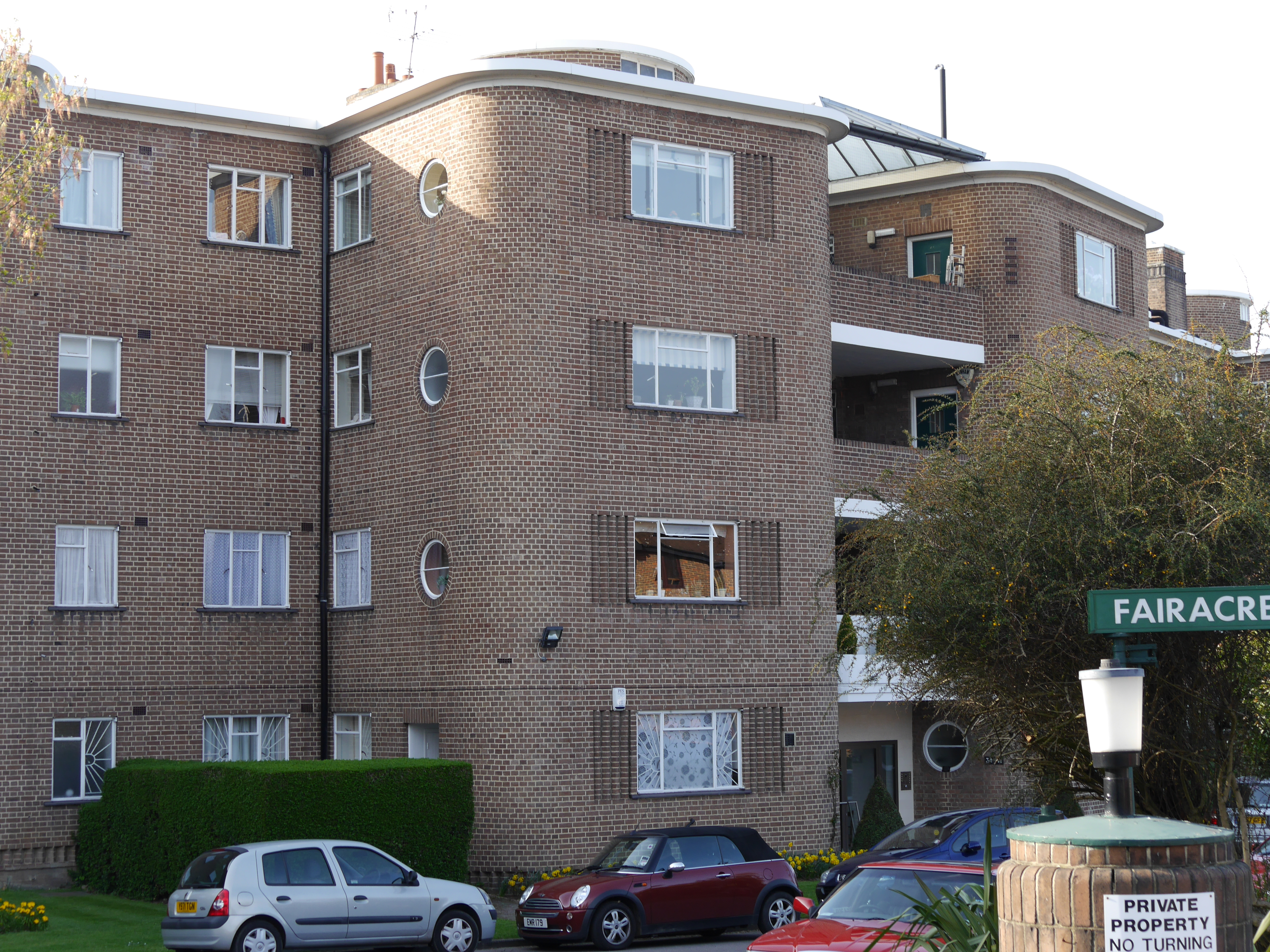
Fairacres, Roehampton

Charles Anthony Minoprio (1900–1988) was a British architect and town planner. Much of his early work was in partnership with Hugh Spencely (1900–1983), a friend since they attended Harrow School together. Later he worked more as a town planner, particularly the New Town of Crawley.

== Early life and education ==
Minoprio went to Harrow School and the University of Oxford, then studied for five years at the University of Liverpool's School of Architecture, where he obtained a Bachelor of Architecture degree in 1925 and an MA three years later. His Beaux-Arts training informed his later work on designing "visually striking" town plans. His architectural training also came in Liverpool under Charles Herbert Reilly, "a believer in grand neoclassical designs of wide avenues". This influenced his views on the importance of good architecture being an integral part of the town planning process and an important feature in a town's civic pride. He worked for a few months at an architectural firm in New York, then was awarded a scholarship to the British School at Rome to study architecture. He went into architectural practice in 1928 and initially worked on commissions for country houses.

== Career highlights ==
In 1932, Minoprio and Spencely designed an extension to the Royal School for the Blind, Liverpool, founded in 1791 by Edward Rushton. Four years later, they designed Fairacres, Roehampton, a Grade II listed four-storey apartment block at Roehampton Lane, Roehampton, London. It was built for the property developer Charles Kearley. The block of 64 flats in a semi-elliptical arc is modern in style with 1930s curved walls, but traditional in construction. It has been very little altered since being built. The two architects worked together again between 1944 and 1946 when they produced an outline plan for the postwar redevelopment of Worcester. Their plans showed extensive areas of open space and parkland, especially around the cathedral, and a combined shopping centre and bus station, among other features.

== Post-war work ==
Minoprio was heavily involved with town planning after World War II, both in England and elsewhere. In September 1944 he prepared a survey and plan for the redevelopment of part of the Essex county town, Chelmsford. He proposed major changes to the town centre, which he considered to be "of no particular architectural merit", and a riverside civic centre with surrounding open space reminiscent of Oxford and Cambridge. The "somewhat grandiose vision" was completed by two major new roads and ten residential "neighbourhood units". Nothing came of the plan, but elements of it made their way into the 1952 Development Plan for the County of Essex which guided Chelmsford's later development.

Three years later, Crawley Development Corporation appointed him as consultant planner in place of Thomas Wilfred Sharp after the latter's sudden decision to resign soon after submitting his master plan—"an extraordinary decision [... which was] never completely explained". By June 1947 Minoprio had prepared a new draft plan, and this was approved and published in December 1947. This time, Minoprio's vision of a carefully planned and balanced community was seen through to its conclusion by the Development Corporation under the leadership of its "dogmatic and highly successful" chairman Thomas Bennett. Crawley is now much larger than originally anticipated: the plan's target population of 50,000 was exceeded within 13 years of work beginning, and there are now more than 105,000 residents. Nevertheless, the town's design and layout remain substantially similar to Minoprio's plan.

Minoprio worked again with Spencely and another town planner, Peter Macfarlane, on master plans for several cities outside England in the 1950s and 1960s. They designed plans for Kuwait City in 1951, Baghdad in 1956, Dhaka in 1959 and Chittagong in 1961.

Back in England, Minoprio later designed the Whitgift Centre, a large split-level shopping centre in Croydon. The development was built between 1965 and 1970 by Fitzroy Robinson & Partners. Architectural historians Ian Nairn and Nikolaus Pevsner stated that "most of the architectural details are banal, but the centre functions unusually well as a shopping precinct".

== Publications ==
Minoprio published the following works:

- The Minor Domestic Architecture of Gloucestershire (1931, with Arthur T. Broadbent)
- A Restoration of the Basilica of Constantine, Rome (1932)
- Chelmsford Planning Survey 1945: A Survey and Plan for Chelmsford Borough and Rural District (1945)
- An Outline Development Plan for the County of the City of Worcester (1946, with Hugh Spencely)
- The Town and Country Planning Act, 1947 Administration in Counties: Together With the Town and Country Planning Act, 1947 Delegation to County Districts (1948, with G.N.C. Swift and C.W. Seddon)
- A Master Plan for Crawley New Town (1949)

== Bibliography ==
- Gray, Fred, ed. (1983). Crawley: Old Town, New Town. Paper No. 18 (Centre for Continuing Education, University of Sussex ed.). Falmer: University of Sussex. ISBN 0-904242-21-8.
- Gwynne, Peter (1990). A History of Crawley. Chichester: Phillimore & Company. ISBN 0-85033-718-6.
- Larkham, Peter J. (2007). "Chapter 6 – Selling the future city: images in UK post-war reconstruction plans". In Boyd Whyte, Iain (ed.). Man-Made Future: Planning, education and design in mid-twentieth-century Britain. Routledge. pp. 99–121. ISBN 978-0-203-00395-4.
- Lescenko Fuller, Ana; Home, Robert (2007). "On the planning history of Chelmsford" (PDF). Papers in Land Management. 9. Cambridge: Anglia Ruskin University. Archived from the original (PDF) on 17 December 2012.
- Nairn, Ian; Pevsner, Nikolaus (1971) [1962]. The Buildings of England: Surrey (2nd ed.). Harmondsworth: Penguin Books. ISBN 0-300-09675-5.
- Ward, Stephen V. (2010). "Chapter 3 – Transnational planners in a postcolonial world". In Healey, Patsy; Upton, Robert (eds.). Crossing Borders: International exchange and planning practices. Routledge. pp. 47–72. ISBN 978-0-203-85708-3.
