= Stonewater =

Stonewater may refer to:

- Stonewater (housing association)
- Stonewater Golf Course
