= Hugh Spencely =

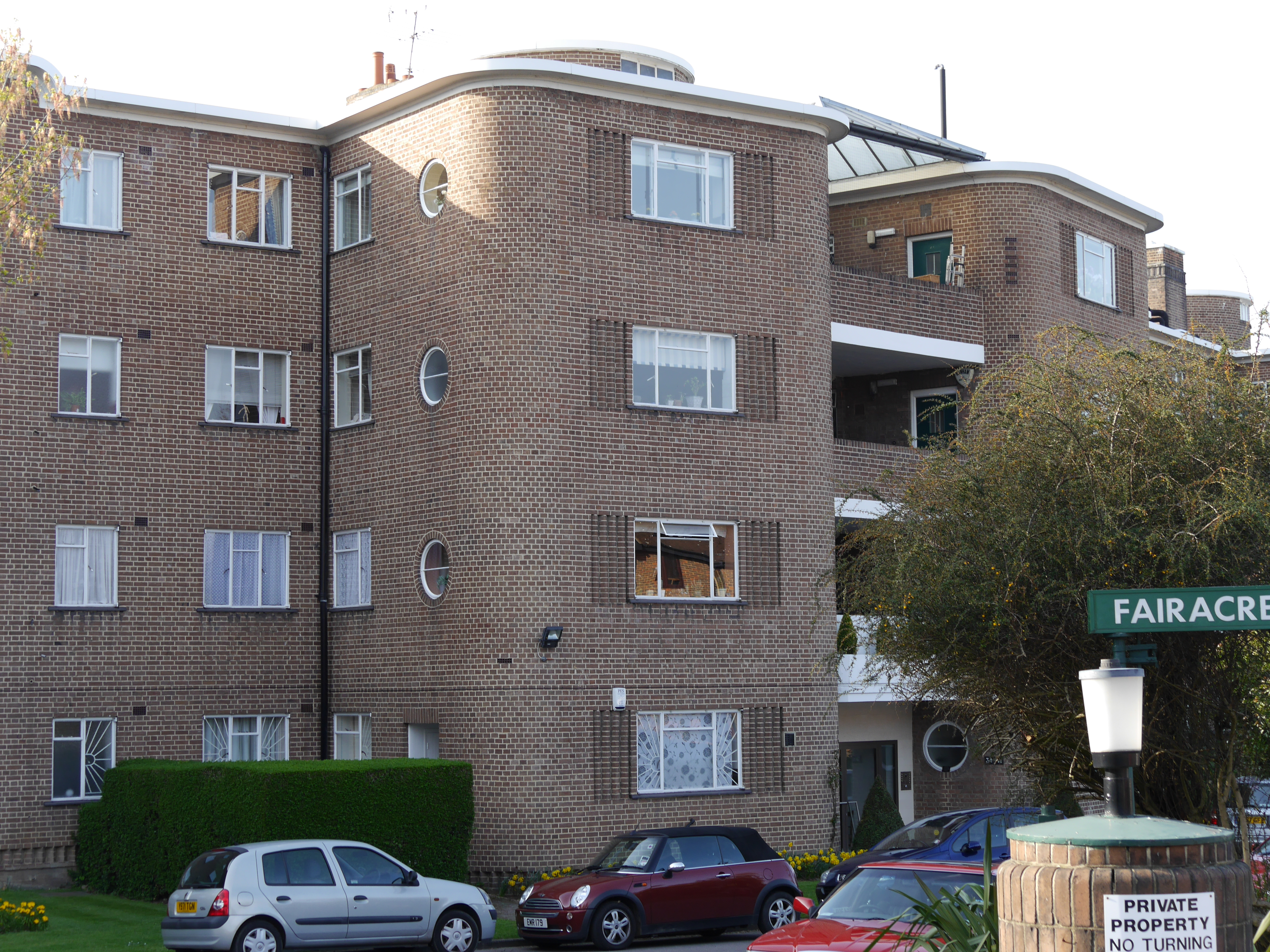
Fairacres, Roehampton

Hugh Greville Castle Spencely (1900–1983) (commonly known as Greville) was a British architect. He mostly worked in partnership with Anthony Minoprio (1900–1988), the two having been friends since they were schoolboys at Harrow School.

== Career ==
Minoprio and Spencely designed the 1932 extension to the Royal School for the Blind, Liverpool, founded in 1791 by Edward Rushton.

They also designed Fairacres, Roehampton, a Grade II listed four-storey apartment block at Roehampton Lane, Roehampton, London. It was built in 1936, for the property developer Charles Kearley. The block of 64 flats in a semi-elliptical arc is modern in style with 1930s curved walls, but traditional in construction. It is very little altered since being built.

== Personal life ==
In 1931, Spencely married Patricia Emily Manson-Bahr, the daughter of Sir Philip Manson-Bahr. They had four children, Janet Mary, Hugh David, John Despenser and Sally Catherine Spencely.

Spencely designed and built an "elegant, idiosyncratic house" for himself and his family in 1936 at Crockham Hill, Kent, on land he had bought three years earlier. The New House (now known as Spencely's and listed at Grade II in 2023) combines elements of Modernism and traditional vernacular architecture.
