= Bradbury Fields =

British charity organisation

Coordinates: 53.4224°N 2.8850°W

- Founded: 1857
- Registration no.: 222798
- Location: Liverpool, England
- Region served: Merseyside
- Product: Services for blind and partially sighted people
- Key people: Philip Longworth, (Chief Executive)
- Revenue: £913,766 for tax year ending 31 March 2011
- Employees: Approximately 28
- Volunteers: Approximately 160 as of 2008
- Website: bradburyfields.org.uk

Bradbury Fields is a charity based in Liverpool, UK, which works with blind and partially sighted people. It has been described by the BBC as "Liverpool's main charity for the blind" and is part of the 800 Group, a consortium of Merseyside health and care charities.

== Activities ==
The organisation's main activities, as registered with the UK Charity Commission are:

- providing assessment and rehabilitation services to blind and partially sighted people across Liverpool and Knowsley
- holding the register of blind and partially sighted people on behalf of the local authority
- providing a training and transcription service to outside agencies
- providing health and social activities to service users

Among the social activities provided to service users is a tandem riding club, featured in the BBC programme You and Yours. There is also an art group, running since 1997, which has held an exhibition at Liverpool Central Library, and an "online exhibition" in association with National Museums Liverpool.

In 2012, Bradbury Fields and OnThisROC started running a climbing club for visually impaired teenagers, allowing them to take part in the National Indoor Climbing Achievement Scheme.

== History ==
=== Founding and early years ===
The first formal meeting of what became Bradbury Fields was held in 1857 by a committee of 14 women, headed by founder Mary Wainwright, under the name "The Society For Supplying Home Teachers And Books In Moon's Systems or Embossed Type to Enable the Blind to Read". In particular, the organisation aimed to teach blind people to read scripture and the Bible.

In 1861 the Society merged with Liverpool Workshops for the Blind, then based in Liverpool's Bold Street, and was renamed the "Liverpool Society for Promoting the Welfare of the Blind". This saw a refocusing of the charity's aims to include providing employment and vocational training to blind people.

=== Liverpool Voluntary Society for the Blind ===
After going under a number of other names, including "Liverpool Home Teaching Society for the Blind", the organisation became "Liverpool Voluntary Society for the Blind" (LVSB) in 1970 in response to an increasingly large amount of the work of home teaching being carried out by Liverpool City Council.

To avoid a number of local visual impairment organisations competing for the same funding from Liverpool City Council, in 1995 the Merseyside Forum for Local Providers was formed, consisting of Action for Blind People, [Christopher Grange Visual Rehabilitation Centre [Catholic Blind Institute], Guide Dogs, Henshaws Society for Blind People and LVSB itself.

=== Bradbury Fields ===
In 2003, LVSB purchased part of the property it shared with Guide Dogs thanks to funding from organisations including the Bradbury Trust and Blatchington Court Trust (an organisation which promotes the education needs of young visually impaired people). This saw the renaming of the building where LVSB is based (in the Dovecot area of Liverpool) to the Bradbury Centre. In 2006, the society itself was renamed to Bradbury Fields. As of 2012, Bradbury Fields continues to share the Bradbury Centre with Guide Dogs, as well as an artificial eye unit and a counselling service run by Action for Blind People.

LVSB lost a quarter of its funding in 2006 after the Royal National Institute of Blind People said it was unable to provide the charity with its usual £250,000 yearly funding owing to stock market changes over the past year and a decrease in legacy funds.

Bradbury Fields' Bradbury Centre has subsequently been used to hold events to help blind and partially sighted people into work, with participation from local colleges and universities as well as multi-national corporations such as Shell and BP.

In the run-up to the UK's May 2010 general election, the Bradbury Centre was visited by local politicians keen to show their support for community organisations. Then prospective parliamentary candidate for the Labour Party, Luciana Berger (later MP for the area), wrote about her visit in February 2010, as did Conservative candidate Pamela Hall shortly afterwards. In 2012 the Centre was also visited by Labour MP for West Derby, Stephen Twigg.

Two days after UK Prime Minister David Cameron launched his "Big Society" initiative in Liverpool, Bradbury Fields was cited in the local press as an example of where Cameron's ideas are already in action and how groups of community-based volunteers have for many years provided "a better service than would be achieved through the public sector".

In 2011, Bradbury Fields was cited as one of the reasons (along with Wavertree's Royal School for the Blind) for UK supermarket Sainsbury's choice to use a store in nearby Woolton for its trial of Braille signage.

== Staff and trustees ==
After 19 years as chief executive, Jim Moran retired in March 2013, and was succeeded by former RNIB employee Philip Longworth.

Moran appeared on BBC Radio 4 show In Touch on a number of occasions to discuss topics relevant to visually impaired people such as assistive technology and training of airline staff. He also called for Staffordshire bull terriers to be recognised as dangerous dogs after his guide dog was attacked in an incident which was covered on BBC News online, BBC North West Tonight and later BBC Breakfast.

Trustees of the charity include BBC Radio Merseyside personality Roger Phillips.
