= The Blue Coat School, Oldham =

Church of England academy in Oldham, Greater Manchester, England

The Blue Coat School
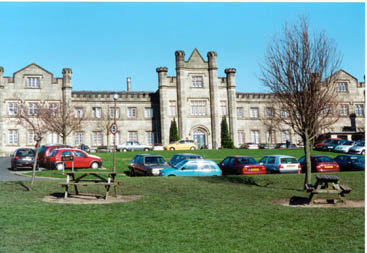

Location
- Egerton Street; Oldham, Greater Manchester, OL1 3SQ; England
- 53.546°N 2.1083°W Building details

General information
- Year built: 1829–1834
- Cost: £7,900.00

Design and construction
- Architect: Richard Lane
- Designations: Grade II Listed

Information
- Type: Academy
- Motto: Semper Quaereamus Virtutem (Let Us Always Seek Virtue)
- Religious affiliation: Church of England
- Established: 1834; 192 years ago
- Founder: Thomas Henshaw
- Department for Education URN: 137133 Tables
- Ofsted: Reports
- Chair of Governors: J. Lees
- Headteacher: Julie Hollis MA (Oxon) (CEO; previous headteacher); Robert Higgins MA (Headteacher)
- Religious head: Richard Ford
- Gender: Co-educational
- Age: 11 to 18
- Enrolment: 1,400 (300 in sixth form)
- Houses: Birley Hall; Lord Mothersill; Rountree Wrigley
- Colour: Navy Blue
- Publication: The Blue Print
- Website: www.blue-coat.org

The Blue Coat School is a co education Church of England academy for 11- to 18-year-olds, located in the town of Oldham, Greater Manchester, England.

The school caters for pupils aged 11–18, offering A-level and GCSE courses. It is one of the few schools in the country to hold Leading Edge Partnership programme and science college status. Prior to becoming leading edge, Blue Coat had been a beacon school. This means the school has social responsibility to help develop other secondary schools in the area, as well as themselves.

The motto of the school is from the Latin: Semper Quaereamus Virtutem – "Let us always seek virtue".

== History ==
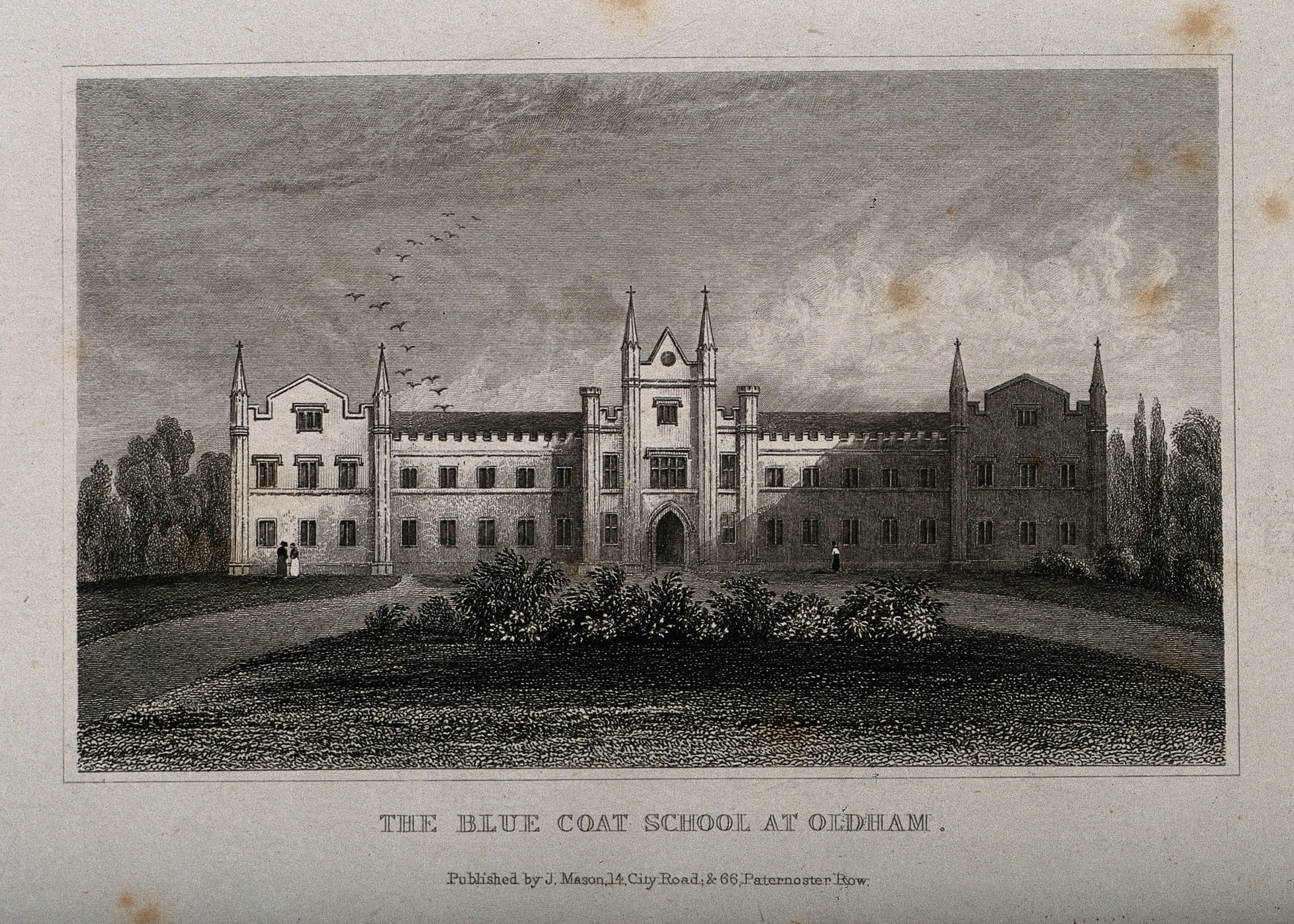
A line engraving of the early Blue Coat School

Thomas Henshaw, who died in 1810, left the sum of £40,000 (£2.7 million as of 2025) for the endowment of the Blue Coat School. The estate was tied up in litigation for many years but was eventually released. As no provision had been made for the cost of the building, a public meeting was held in Oldham in September 1825, when offers of land were received, and a public appeal was launched for funds to build the school. From the design of the architect Richard Lane, a start was made in 1829 when the foundation stone was laid, and the school was opened in 1834. Throughout the remainder of the 19th century, the school continued to maintain and instruct between 100 and 130 boys.

In July 1952, the trustees decided that, as the number of boarders in residence was gradually decreasing, Blue Coat should be closed as a residential school and the building converted for use as a secondary modern day school. This plan was effected, and the school became co-educational accommodating approximately 400 students.

The Oldham Henshaw and Church of England Educational Trust, constituted in 1950, had as one of its aims the building and maintenance of new secondary schools, and one of its objectives was to provide a Special Agreement secondary school by extending and reorganising the Blue Coat into a comprehensive school. This plan was realised in September 1966 when the Blue Coat School became fully comprehensive. It is now a nine form entry voluntary aided comprehensive school admitting 218 boys and girls each year, with a sixth form, the majority of whom go on to Higher Education. Voluntary aided status means that the governors of the school are responsible for the upkeep of all buildings and have to rely on the financial support and generosity of parents and friends of the school.

== Current information ==
Recent government grants have enabled the school to venture into a multimillion-pound building scheme. So far additions have been a wheelchair lift to increase disabled access; and the reconstruction and further reconstruction of the school's main entrance. In 1994 the school completed a major fund-raising campaign, enabling it to build a new science department building, which was completed in 1995. Completed in 2005, the new multimillion-pound sports hall opened on the east side of the school grounds, and due to this increase in PE space, the school has converted the old girls' gym into the new whole-school restaurant, also this building was extended with a second floor mezzanine for the 6th form students. With the whole school catered for in the restaurant, the house block which contained the old canteens was closed down. This has now been turned from a dated 1960s 6 classroom building into a 12 classroom 21st century building now housing year 7, 8 & 9 rather than the 3 houses. Also, the building near the entrance gates has been refurbished and had structural work done, forming a new building for more music activities, such as those who have music lessons (vocal, strings, brass and more) to improve musical abilities.

The Blue Coat school serves a broad catchment area, providing an education for those who live in the areas of Oldham, Manchester, Tameside and Rochdale. Physically, the school is located within easy walking distance of Oldham Town Centre. Currently, there are around 1100 pupils in the main school, with an additional 300 in the sixth form. There are also over 150 members of staff, teaching or otherwise.

During a school year, there are three communions (Christmas, Easter and end of year) and the assemblies during the school time have a strong Christian theme. Reflecting the strong Christian ethos of the school, Religious Studies continues to be compulsory taught subject for pupils at GCSE level.

As is the case in most English secondary schools, in years seven to nine, pupils study a broad range of subjects in Key Stage 3, before taking Standard Attainment Tests (SATs) in the core subjects of Mathematics, English and Science in year 9. These examinations test the competency of both the pupils' understanding of each subject as well as the standard of their teaching. Years ten and eleven Key Stage 4 involves work which leads to General Certificate of Secondary Education (GCSE) qualifications. Pupils must take the core subjects of Mathematics, English (Language and Literature), Science (Double or Triple), and R.S (Religious Studies). In addition to these, pupils are given the option of four more subjects, one being a language and another being a Humanity, plus two extras which could be Drama Studies, Computer Science, Art (Fine Art, Photography or Textiles), Social Science, Child Development, Music, Physical Education, Business Studies, or one of several Design and Technology courses (GCSE Design & Technology, GCSE Food & Nutrition, or Construction (Level 1/2 vocational course)). They will also choose a reserve subject, in case they cannot get in a class of one of the subjects or there isn't enough people to make a class. The reserve subject will then replace this subject.

After finishing GCSEs, Pupils can choose to stay at the sixth form for years twelve and thirteen. Alternatively they could choose another sixth form college, such as Oldham Sixth Form College in Oldham or Ashton Sixth Form College in Ashton-under-Lyne. Should pupils stay on at Blue Coat in year 12, they will be required to choose 3 subjects to study for A-level. The school currently offers around 30 different and diverse courses. Students will have the option of keeping all of their subjects through A2, doing three A2-levels in year 13. The intensity of sixth-form is high, with a large amount of coursework expected in each subject, as well as exams at the end of each year. This is in-line with the narrower and more focused nature of the A-level qualifications. Having completed sixth form, students have several options. These include going to university, finding work or taking a gap year.

The most recent Ofsted inspection was in 2011. The school received an outstanding report overall, receiving an excellent rating for teaching in several areas and for management and leadership. The Blue Coat School has the most successful state Sixth Form Centre in the Metropolitan Borough of Oldham, from A/AS Level Results in 2007. The school has traditionally excelled in the league tables under measures of absolute GCSE and A-Level attainment. However the achievement gap between Bluecoat and other local schools is less-stark under the new contextual value added measures of absolute educational progress, introduced by the UK government. In fact in 2008, Grange School in the town, achieved a higher level 2 CVA score than Blue Coat overall, despite having only a 28% GCSE pass rate compared with Bluecoat's 81%. Although it is to be cautioned that small differences in overall CVA scores may not be statistically significant, it is still interesting that schools with such differing GCSE performance overall could have such similar CVA scores.

== Pastoral care ==
Blue Coat School uses a house system for all students within the school. When students join the school they are allocated to one of three houses - Birley Hall, Lord Mothersill and Rountree Wrigley - all named after former governors at the school. Students whose elder family members have studied at the school are usually put within the same houses as those relatives; in some cases both parents and children have at different times been members of the same house. There are nine "forms" in the School between years seven and eleven, and each house looks after three. The names of the forms are Birley, Hall, Birley Hall, Lord, Mothersill, Lord Mothersill, Rountree, Wrigley, and Rountree Wrigley, with their year number added onto the name of the form to get their exact form name e.g. Birley in year 7 is Birley 7, Rountree in year 11 is Rountree 11. In the sixth form, there are eight forms within each year.

Each house used to have a head and deputy, but despite still being allocated to houses, the students are now looked after in year groups. Each year group now has a Director of Learning. They look after pastoral care and discipline for students within that year. The school has House Coordinators to arrange and coordinate house events to ensure the school still retains its house system and to enable the students to retain their house identity.

The students have a fifteen-minute break after two one-hour lessons, and a 50-minute lunch break after a further two one-hour lessons, followed by assembly and a final one-hour lesson.

The Year Eleven and Sixth Form students are expected to offer guidance and leadership to students in the lower years of the School. Older students are more likely to take an active part in the houses' religious celebrations around Christmas and Easter.

The Sixth Form (Years 12 and 13) has an Assistant Head Teacher in overall charge supported by separate Heads of year. These take over the main pastoral responsibilities from the house heads for students within that year group. They also take on greater responsibilities for that year group such as preparing the student for external exams and guiding students on their future after leaving the School. With the help of the sixth form tutors, they also help to write the references for the students on application forms for higher education and jobs after leaving the school. Every year group has their own social facilities.

== Senior Students ==
Since 2008, at the end of their lower 6th year (year 12), student's in the sixth form are able to apply for a position as a senior student. These positions include the house captains as well as the head boy and head girl. They are responsible for taking a leading role in school life and representing the school at various community events. Senior students lead preparations for the Year 13 leavers prom, and also suggest charities the sixth form, subsequently decided through a ballot process, donate to. In 2008 this included the Head Boy Ryan Wan and Head Girl Olivia Price appearing on TV during The Royal British Legion's "Festival of Remembrance".

== Annual events ==
- Founder's Day - The commemoration of the school's founder Thomas Henshaw. This is usually held towards the end of July and involves the school's pupils parading in front of the residents of Oldham as they march down to the parish church. Here, there is a service which recognises the achievements of the founder, with a wreath laid at "the Old Blues' Grave". The assembled school then proceeds back to the grounds of the school where a wreath is laid in front of Henshaw's statue.
- Speech Night - Usually held on the second Friday in November, this recognises the achievements of pupils over the past academic year. Notable feature of the ceremony are the speech by the headteacher and the many awards given to pupils for the previous year's work. Over previous years, the ceremony has taken place at Manchester Cathedral and Oldham's Queen Elizabeth Hall.
- Christmas Fayre - Until 2014 every year the student's had a Christmas Fayre which occurred on the last academic day of the year and the pupils were encouraged to raise money for charity by paying to wear non-uniform, watch/take part in a talent show and buy items at the fayre itself. Over £6000 was raised in the one day benefiting 3 charities nominated by the pupils. There is also a staff pantomime.

== Admissions policy and criticism ==
The area in Oldham where the school is based consists predominantly of the most-deprived areas in the North West. The school’s catchment area for pupil intake covers a broad geographical area, extending over much of Rochdale, Oldham, Greater Manchester and Tameside. Blue Coat’s policy, as a faith school, of religious selection for a portion of its pupils, means that children living in close proximity to the school, who apply to it, may not receive offers, with places assigned to students who live further away, but better meet the selection criteria.

Both Blue Coat and Crompton House CE School in Shaw have a consistent record of high achievement at GCSE and A-Level, in an area generally characterised by entrenched educational underachievement. Both have received criticism, unrelated to performance, for their former Christian-only admissions policies, which meant non-Anglican families were excluded from the two best schools in the Oldham area on religious grounds. This faith-based admissions policy proved controversial, and led to accusations that the predominantly white, Christian school was unrepresentative of the ethnic makeup of the local area. Approximately 25% of Oldham's 250,000 strong population consists of Muslim families, the majority of which are originally of Pakistani and Bangladeshi extraction

These policies caused the school to be thrust uncomfortably into the glare and scrutiny of the media spotlight in the aftermath of the Oldham Riots, and the schools attracted criticism. The Liberal Democrat education spokesman Phil Willis cited Blue Coat as an example of a school which has only a few non-white pupils despite being in a predominantly ethnic-minority area. This erroneous statement was made even though he had never visited the area, which is in a predominantly white working class area. Consequently, both schools found themselves open to accusations of racism, and that they were helping to foster educational "apartheid" by helping to further perpetuate the high-levels of racial segregation in the town.

After 2008, major changes were made to the admissions policy, after which applications from any religion that is part of the UK Inter-Faith Network could be made for Year 7 pupils, opening the school up to applicants from Muslim, Sikh and Jewish faiths, along with non-Anglican Christian applicants. This document states that applications from members of these faiths will be judged using the same criteria as for Christian applicants.

The school's admission policy has made it a target for critics of religious selection; Blue Coat has had this misfortune of located in an area that suffered from a race riot, which has led to a spotlight being focused on the school's policies at a national level.

== Buildings ==
- Henshaw House (HE) (previously the Main Building (MB)) - the original structure from the 19th century and designed by Richard Lane. Contains the school library, and also holds the Modern Foreign Languages classrooms and staff rooms.
- Main Hall (part of HE) - Used for most assemblies, and also school concerts and performances. The surrounding rooms used to be used as music classrooms, rehearsal space and a drama theatre, but are now used as SEN support space labelled the "Green Room".
- Maisie Mosco Building (MM) (previously North East Building (NE) or Junior block) - A three-story structure which contains twelve classrooms, mainly used to teach English, with 3 classrooms on the top floor used also to teach maths.
- Kirkman House (KH) - the old vicars house, used as offices for the Cranmer Education Trust. Also has a secret staircase leading to the attic of the building.
- Lees Building (LE) (previously Art and Technology Block (AT)) - Contains the art classrooms, as well as Design & Technology, Product Design, Physics, Food and Textiles.
- Annie Kenney Building (AK) (previously the House Block (HB)) - Three stories each belonging to one of the three year groups in KS3 (previously the different houses). The top floor is run by year 7, the middle by year 8 and the bottom by year 9. The space is mainly used socially at lunch times, also since the recent refurbishment geography, history, and RS departments have moved into the building, it also houses the KS3 lockers.
- Sports Hall - the newest edition to the school. Containing a huge sports hall, 2 classrooms changing rooms and staff facilities.
- Restaurant - previously the gym, on one side is the whole school restaurant, and on the other side the refurbished old boys gym, and now upstairs the 6th form mezzanine (mezz) used during study periods and at lunch and break times by the 6th form.
- Patrick Steptoe building (PS) (previously the science block (SC))- A three-storey building with rooms dedicated to science teaching. The cellar has been converted into a social space for pupils in year 10 known as the Undercroft. However the third story is off limits to students.
- Geoff Tootill building (GT) (previously the IT block (IT)) - the downstairs is mainly used as a social space for year 11 pupils. Upstairs contains IT and business studies classrooms. It is set to be demolished.
- Jean Taylor Block (JT) - Was used for Modern Foreign Languages a pre-fabricated building on the west of the school. It housed art during the refurbishment of the upper part of the Lees building. Later on, the JT building had no use until September 2021 when it was converted into a 6th form centre for Year 12 students.
- Sociology Block (SO) - contains two modern classrooms equipped with store rooms dedicated to each classroom. It was used to teach social sciences such as psychology and sociology until the Brian Clarke building was opened in 2014. Teachers such as Miss A Ash and Mrs S Devine teach there. It is now used by the award-winning Brass Band as a rehearsal space as well as extra MFL classrooms.
- "The Lodge" - built around the same time as the main building, situated at the bottom of the drive, as a gatehouse. This was the caretakers lodge, but has now been converted into a set of music practice rooms.and is used for music lessons.
- The Brian Clarke (BC) Building - newly built for the 2014/2015 academic year. The £2.7 million building is home to maths, computer science business studies, and social sciences.
- The Hogan-Steel Mills (HS) building (previously the Drama/Music block (DM) and the PE department (PE)) - underneath the sports home and holds the brand new recording studio, drama suite and music classrooms.

In 2014 the buildings of the Blue Coat school were renamed after notable people from Oldham. For example, Patrick Steptoe was the man who invented IVF and first used it in Oldham. They were voted for by staff and pupils.

== Notable members of staff ==
- Tony Ballantyne - science fiction author
- Tony Wilson, Radio and television presenter who later co founded the record label Factory Records.

== Notable former pupils ==
=== Comedy ===
- Tommy Cannon, comedian and singer, part of the Cannon and Ball duo.

=== Performing arts ===
- Alex Carter, drama student who attended Blue Coat, Alex played 17-year-old Lee Hunter in Hollyoaks, aired on Channel 4, before joining the cast of Emmerdale in 2006. Prior to joining Hollyoaks in 2001 he appeared in Adam's Family Tree and Where the Heart Is on TV as well as some plays for Radio 4.
- Millie Gibson, actress, known for Coronation Street and Doctor Who.
- Amy James-Kelly Formerly Amy Radford, attended The Blue Coat School between 2007 and 2014. In 2013, after starring in several school performances, she landed the role of Maddie Heath in Coronation Street.
- Ellis Hollins, actor, appeared in Hollyoaks playing the character of Tom since 2002.
- Mark Jordon, actor in Heartbeat, former husband of Siobhan Finneran (Rita, Sue and Bob Too)
- Naomi Radcliffe, actress.
- Sally Ann Matthews, actress who played Jenny Bradley in Coronation Street.
- Wendy Jane Walker, actress who played Susan Barlow in Coronation Street

=== Sport ===
- Eribe Doro, at the school 2012–2017, Rugby League player who currently plays for RFL Championship team Bradford Bulls.
- John Davey (born 29 December 1964), former British Olympic swimmer. At the 1982 Commonwealth Games in Brisbane, Australia, he won bronze medals in both the 400 m freestyle and 400 m individual medley. He also competed at the Olympics in Seoul (1988) and in Barcelona (1992).
- David Beresford, footballer. A midfielder, he made 236 league appearances in a 12-year career in the Football League. He also won 14 caps for the England under-16s and under-18s.
- Matthew Wolfenden, footballer, played for FC United of Manchester after beginning his senior career at Oldham Athletic A.F.C., currently plays for Stalybridge Celtic.
- Stephen Bywater, footballer. Bywater was signed for West Ham United in 1997, after being spotted by a talent scout whilst training for Rochdale A.F.C. As of 2018 he plays for Burton Albion
- Stephen J. Gordon (born 4 September 1986), chess Grandmaster. In September 2004, he took a break from his A-level studies of Further Mathematics and Physics to compete in the thirteenth Monarch Assurance Isle of Man International Championship, where he achieved 33rd place.
- Katie Zelem, captain of Manchester United Women's Team.
- Hannah Diamond (netballer), named as part of the Wasps Netball squad for the 2023 Netball Superleague season.
- Phil Joy attended the school 2003–2008 (born 4 September 1991) is an English professional rugby league footballer who plays as a prop for Oldham in the Betfred Championship.

=== Television and radio ===
- Tony Prince, Radio presenter who worked on Radio Caroline

=== YouTube ===
- Tom Cassell, YouTuber, currently has over 10 million subscribers on his main channel TheSyndicateProject.

== See also ==
- Listed buildings in Oldham
