= Astle Park =

Park in Cheshire, England

Coordinates: 53.259°N 2.280°W

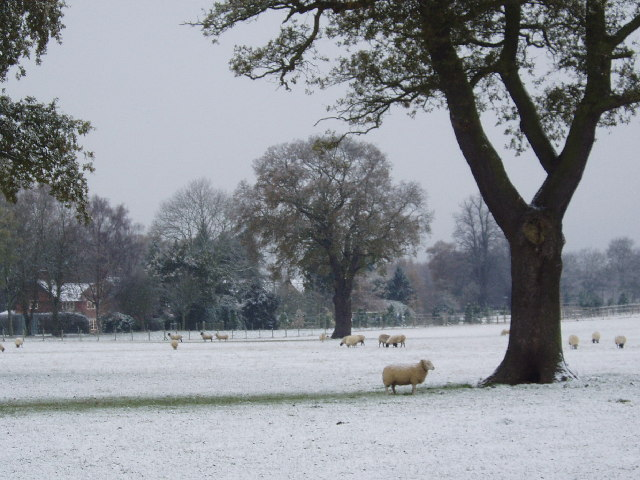
Astle Park in winter

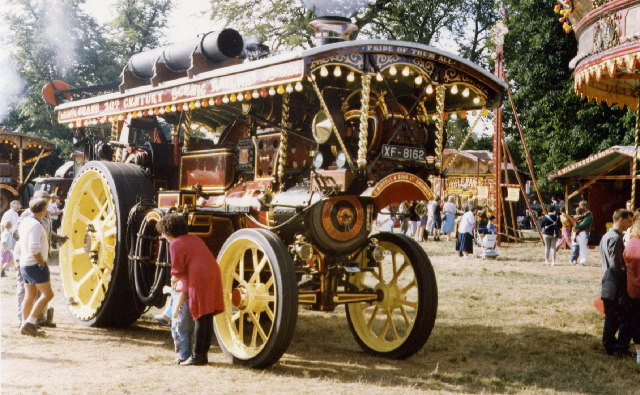
Steam fair at Astle Park (2000)

Astle Park is an area of land in the countryside a mile or so south of Chelford in Cheshire in England, on the west side of the A535 road (Holmes Chapel Road) from Chelford to Jodrell Bank. It is sometimes used to hold events and shows: see List of steam fairs. Astle park is also well known for holding VW Goth during the bank holiday weekend in August. Which is very popular for all Volkswagen campers and cars.

Henshaws Society for Blind People formerly owned Astle Park.
