= Hannah Diamond (netball) =

English netball player

Personal information
- Full name: Hannah Diamond
- Born: 17 October 2003 (age 22) Oldham
- Height: 175 cm (5 ft 9 in)
- School: The Blue Coat School, Oldham
- University: University of Birmingham

Netball career
- Playing positions: WA, GA
Years	Club team	Apps
2023	Wasps Netball	
- Updated on October 2022

Hannah Diamond (born 17 October 2003) is an English netball player. She was named as part of the Wasps Netball squad for the 2023 Netball Superleague season.

== Early life ==
She attended The Blue Coat School, Oldham where she was Head Girl and captain of the school netball team, which won the England Netball U19 2021/22 National Schools Finals.
