= Empty dwelling management order =

Legal order in England and Wales

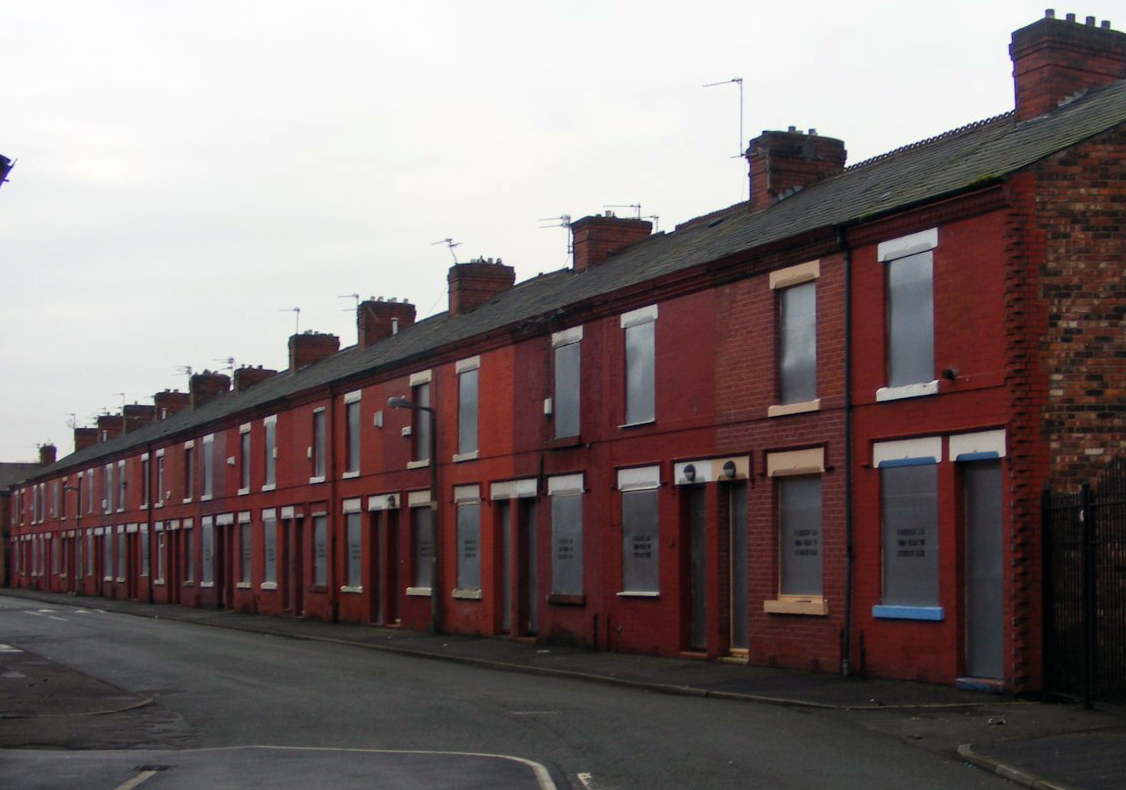
Boarded-up housing in Salford.

Empty dwelling management orders (EDMOs) are a legal device used in England and Wales, which enable local authorities to put an unoccupied property back into use as housing. EDMOs were created by the Housing Act 2004, with the relevant legislation coming into effect in mid-2006; in the three and a half years to the end of 2010, however, only 43 had been issued.

== Background ==
A significant number of residential properties in Britain are empty at any one time; whilst a large proportion of these are empty on a temporary basis, for example during refurbishment or during changes in ownership, many remain unoccupied for long stretches of time. These properties pose a problem in two ways; they tend to decrease the quality of life in their area, by becoming magnets for vandalism and the like, and they indirectly contribute to the problem of homelessness by limiting the pool of available housing.

Local authorities have traditionally had a number of powers to force abandoned buildings back into use, most notably the power of compulsory purchase and enforced sale. In the first of these cases, the property is purchased by the council; in the second, the owner is compelled to offer it for sale in the open market. However, both of these required a forcible change of ownership, and especially with an enforced sale, there was no guarantee that the building would actually be put back into use.

In 2001, the Empty Homes Agency suggested that rather than force the properties to be sold, the local authorities could instead force them to be rented out to tenants, a "compulsory leasing" process. A parliamentary select committee adopted the idea, but government support for legislation was limited. In 2003, as the government drafted plans for housing reform, it issued consultation papers on a proposed form of "empty homes management orders", but they were not made part of the final Housing Bill. They were added to the bill, now titled as "empty dwelling management orders", in an amendment by David Kidney MP, with broad cross-party support.

Whilst they had broad parliamentary support, the EDMOs were strongly criticised in some sections of the media, with the Daily Express reporting that the government wanted to seize 250,000 homes, and a columnist in the Sunday Times declaring that Britain had become a "communist country". In 2015, Peter Box, spokesman for the Local Government Association, said that councils considered EDMOs "complex and difficult to use." Brandon Lewis, speaking as housing minister, said that EDMOs were "an ineffective and unpopular policy of the last administration, which undermined civil liberties and which simply didn't work."

The legislation first came into force in 2006, but no orders were issued that year. As of June 2009, 24 interim EDMOs had been approved, "nearly half" of which had been approved in the preceding twelve months; by the end of 2010, a total of 43 had been approved. The total had risen to 108 by the end of 2014. The Residential Property Tribunal reported that a further 98 applications were made in 2015-22, with no applications made in 2023 or 2024, though it is not clear how many of those were successful.

== Powers ==
A local authority wishing to use an EDMO must apply to a residential property tribunal for approval of an interim order, the first stage in the process. The tribunal must be satisfied that the property has been empty for at least two years, as well as being heavily vandalised or actively used for "antisocial" purposes. The regulations originally stated that a house simply had to be unoccupied for six months and not likely to be occupied in the near future, with a good chance that if an EDMO was granted it would be put back into use. However, this period was extended by the Coalition government following the 2010 United Kingdom general election, with the new policy coming into force in November 2012. The new regulations also require that the property be "causing a nuisance for the community", and that there is local support for the use of an EDMO. In September 2026, plans were announced to reduce the requirements, bringing them back to a similar level to the original 2006 regulations.

Certain classes of property are completely exempt – houses temporarily unoccupied because the resident is in care, for example, or holiday homes. Properties in the process of being sold or let are likewise exempt. The tribunal is not required to grant requests which comply with the requirements, and where it does grant the request there is an appeals process for property owners. The orders cannot be granted for partly occupied buildings – so it cannot be used on an empty set of lodger's rooms within a house – or for non-residential properties.

Once an interim EDMO has been granted, it lasts for up to twelve months, during which the authority works with the owner to try and agree a way to put the property back into use. The authority is considered legally in possession (in control) of the property during this time, but does not gain legal ownership; it can change the locks but not sell the house. If no agreement is reached during this time, and the building remains unoccupied, the authority may make a final EDMO, which lasts for up to seven years. A final EDMO differs from an interim EDMO in that the authority is not required to obtain the owner's consent before finding a tenant for the property. If the authority fails to find an occupier for the property, or decides it cannot reasonably get the property occupied, it must hand back possession to the owner.

When a tenant has been found under the EDMO, the rent is paid to the local authority, who are able to recover any costs they may have incurred by taking possession of the property and making it habitable, as well as the routine costs of maintenance and letting. However, any money over and above these costs is to be paid to the owner of the property.
