= Henshaws Society for Blind People =

Henshaws Society for Blind People (founded in 1837 by an Oldham businessman named Thomas Henshaw) is a specialist charity providing support, advice and training to anyone affected by sight loss and other disabilities.

The charity has changed names four times. In 1921, it was 'Henshaw's Institution for the Blind'. In January 1971, it changed its former name to 'Henshaw's Society for the Blind'. Finally in 2000, it was renamed as the 'Henshaws Society for Blind People.' In 2016, the charity shortened its name to simply 'Henshaws', introducing the strap line 'Beyond Expectations'. In the same year, it also changed its logo and branding to bright pink.

== History ==
=== Founding ===
Thomas Henshaw (1731–1810), a businessman and philanthropist who founded a large and successful hatting business in Oldham, died in 1810 and bequeathed £20,000 (equivalent to roughly £1.4 million in 2017) to establish an institution of the blind in Manchester. Henshaw's will was contested by family members for 26 years, but was eventually upheld by the Court of Chancery in favour of the scheme.

Thomas Henshaw's will said that his "expectation that other persons at their expense purchase land and buildings" for the institution. This was matched by public donations and subscriptions procured through a subscription list across the city and surrounding districts.

A board of management was chosen based on Henshaw's directive that "all subscribers of two guineas or upwards, and donors in any one year of twenty guineas or upwards, shall form a Board of Management, to whom the whole direction and control of the Institutions be entrusted."

=== Development ===
In September 1834, the Board of Management of Henshaw's Blind Asylum and Deaf and Dumb schools, jointly purchased a plot of land adjoining the botanical gardens at Old Trafford Manchester. In 1837 Henshaw's Blind Asylum, later known as Henshaw's Institution for the Blind, was founded in a building built with public contributions in Old Trafford. The site was shared with the school for the Deaf.

In 1850, William Hughes (first Governor of Henshaw's Blind Asylum) took out a patent for the Hughes Typograph, which he claimed to be the first typewriting machine. It was designed primarily to enable the blind to communicate with the sighted. A Hughes Typograph was awarded the gold medal at the Great Exhibition in Hyde Park in 1851. One of these machines is in the Museum of the National Institute for the Blind, and another in the Science Section of the South Kensington Museum, where it is the oldest English Model – the one older machine is American.

In 1861, the asylum added workshop accommodation for brush-making; this was soon discontinued, although basket-making and mat-making continued. Outside blind workers were employed in addition to the inmates.

In 1881, the asylum introduced braille systems into the school, one of the improvements introduced by Governor James McCormick (1876–1892). In 1887 as a result of a bequest by Mr J Pendlebury, the asylum carried out a large extension known as the Pendlebury Extension, consisting of dormitories and workshops.

In 1891, workshops for the blind opened at the corner of Deansgate and Wood Street; the building cost about £9,000 and provided new workshops, formerly in Bloom Street. In 1892 the asylum received nearly £14,000 from James Nasmyth for a large concert hall to seat 500 persons and kitchens. In 1895 the asylum started giving instruction in massage; its pupils were the first in the country to follow this profession. In 1899 it was reported that there had been 28 people admitted to the asylum and that at the end of the year there were 179 inmates of whom 87 were children.

=== Twentieth century ===
In 1900, the Manchester and Salford Blind Aid Society, 30 Tonman Street, Deansgate, Manchester, was founded by Miss Isabel M Heywood of Pendleton, and a small Home opened at the Crescent, Salford. (In 1930 there were 1,390 blind persons on its register – 1,160 in Manchester and 230 in other parts of Lancashire). In 1902, Manchester and Salford Blind Aid Society started a brush department, which it transferred to Henshaws twenty years later. In 1904 W.H. Illingworth, Head Master for twenty years and author of History of the Education of the Blind (1910), was appointed Superintendent. In 1905, the asylum received £10,000 from the trustees of the late James Holden, of Rochdale, providing fifty-five weekly grants to blind people in the area. In 1930 the income from this fund was £380, half of which was used by Henshaws for general expenses, and the other half paid to the Rochdale and District Society. In 1908 Manchester and Salford Blind Aid Society moved their women to a larger home, The Elms, Eccles Old Road, Pendleton, with accommodation for thirty-five.

In 1910, the asylum opened the Hayesleigh Home and Workshops in Old Trafford. It was given by Mr. C. H. Scott, a board member, who afterwards added £3,000 for its endowment. The complex was named The Mary Ann Scott Memorial Home and Workshop after his wife. In 1913 they took an additional house for a College of Music. In 1915 they opened the Gresham Home for 30 blind men, and the Birch Avenue Home for 30 blind women. In 1918, Manchester and Salford Blind Aid Society opened a Home, Oaklands, for 30 aged blind men, next to its Women's Home in the Eccles Old Road, Pendleton.

In 1921, the name was changed to Henshaw's Institution for the Blind. In 1924 Manchester and Salford Blind Aid Society opened an additional house in Eccles Old Road, Pendleton, to accommodate 20 blind women. In 1927 new workshops built on the Hayesleigh site were officially opened in July 1927, resulting in more efficient and economic production.

One of the country's largest private institutions, the asylum occupied a plot of land beside Boyer Street in Old Trafford. In 1930, Mr. W.H. Thurman was appointed director and secretary of Henshaw's Institution for the Blind. It had 118 school pupils, 155 technical pupils, 194 workshop employees, 29 home workers, 64 residents in its Homes and 19 blind instructors, teachers, or other employees. Today, the former asylum is occupied by the Greater Manchester Police Headquarters and dominated by its multi-story office block called Chester House. In 1932 The Gresham Home for Men and the Birch Avenue Home for Women were disposed of, replaced by a new home in Rhyl.

=== After WWII ===
In 1945, evacuated school children – the boys from Ellesmere, Shropshire, and the girls from Fulwood, Preston, returned to Old Trafford. In 1946 under a policy of the Ministry of Education, Henshaws School changed from an all-age school for boys and girls into a secondary special school for pupils aged 12 to 16. In 1948 The Society bought Astle Park at Chelford, Cheshire, for £15,000 with plans to build a new school in the country. After spending the war years at Hare Hill, Macclesfield, the residents of the Mary Ann Scott Memorial Home moved to a new permanent home in Southport on September 27. The home officially opened on November 2.

In 1966, The Society's plans to build a new school at Astle Park were turned down, following complaints by Sir Bernard Lovell at Jodrell Bank that the expansion of computers would eventually interfere with the operation of his radar dish.

The Government offered the Society a 50-acre site in Harrogate. The Society was offered a grant of £250,000 in return for moving to North Yorkshire. The land at Astle Park was finally disposed of in 1995.

In 1971, the new school opened in October and new headquarters were built on part of the old workshop site in Old Trafford. A new scheme for the regulation of the charity, amending the 1924 Scheme was sealed by the Charity Commissioners. A number of outdated clauses in the old scheme were replaced. An important addition gave effect to a change of title to 'Henshaw's Society for the Blind'. In 1972 the Society opened a holiday home in Llandudno, the Belmont Hotel, and a few years later a special care centre was built at Rhyl to accommodate frail elderly residents.

In 1980, The Society merged with the Manchester and Salford Blind Aid Society, making the charity one of the largest in the country. Henshaw's became a Housing Association and opened Dr Pigott Lodge, a sheltered housing scheme in Blackley for retired blind and partially sighted people. In 1982, the Pendleton Special Care Centre was built as an addition to the Elms Home in Salford for people requiring nursing care, known as the Isabel Heywood Centre. In 1985 Government Policy required Henshaw's to implement changes. Part of the pupil accommodation was converted into single study bedrooms to provide residential independence training for pupils over the age of 16. A small special unit was also established for deaf-blind students in this age group. In 1986/7, the Society developed a Community Housing Scheme in Harrogate for students about to leave the college who wished to remain in the area, but needed support in order to achieve independence. (By 2000, the Society had acquired 17 community houses in Harrogate & Knaresborough).

In 1990, Phase I of the Lottie Hobson Centre was completed in November and 30 people moved into the home, which was formerly the Elms. It was officially opened in September 1991. In 1992, the community services delivered from Warwick Road for several years were expanded to create a regional resource centre. In 1992/1993, The Society became a founder member of Opsis, the National Association for the Education, Training and Support of Blind and Partially Sighted People. The work of the charity 'Eyeline' was continued in the form of a family and Patient Support Service – a precursor to later Children and Family Services. In 1993 On July 20, the charity commission granted national charity status to Henshaws.

The Society built a new residential home in Southport after realising that its high standards of care could not be maintained at the original Godfrey Ermen Home. Phase II of the Lottie Hobson Centre was completed. A merger between the Liverpool Workshops and Birkenhead Society for the Blind resulted in the opening of Henshaws Merseyside Resource Centre in The Strand, Liverpool, in April 1993. In June 1993, in collaboration with Manchester Royal Eye Hospital, the Society established a Patient Support Service to provide advice, information, support, counselling and rehabilitation to patients attending hospital appointments. In 1995 A Community Housing initiative in Newcastle was developed for people leaving long hospital stays. The project began in 1994 with the opening of a home for five people. In March 1995, Henshaws Head Office and Greater Manchester Resource Centre moved to new premises in Talbot Road, Old Trafford. John Derby House, named after the late 18th Earl of Derby, President of the Society for 46 years, was officially opened in September 1995 by his nephew, the 19th Earl of Derby. Its School of Visual Impairment Studies based at Henshaw's College opened to provide training for Rehabilitation Officers. It quickly became established as a leading training provider – the only one of its kind in the North of England. In 1996, The Godfrey Ermen Home officially opened on April 26. In 1997 The Society celebrated its 160th anniversary by holding a range of fundraising and profile raising events. On September 8, 1998, Henshaws opened its new Arts and Crafts Centre in Knaresborough, North Yorkshire, partly funded by a £1.8 million grant from the National Lottery through the Arts Council of England. On September 9, 50 clients moved into the craft workshops to begin their training and employment. The Arts and Crafts Centre opened to the general public on April 25, 1999, with a carnival parade involving clients, staff and the local community with facilities for visitors including a café, exhibition gallery and shop.

=== Twenty-first century ===
In December, 2000, the Society changed its name to Henshaws Society for Blind People and renamed its residential establishments in the North West. The Godfrey Ermen Home, Isabel Heywood & Lottie Hobson Centre and Doctor Pigott Lodge became known as the Southport Centre, Pendleton Centre and Blackley Centre respectively.

The Society also set up its first website. On October 9, Phase I of the Garden of the Senses at the Arts and Crafts Centre was opened. The Crown Green Road housing scheme opened on October 23 to provide supported community accommodation for visually impaired people in their 20s to 50s, some with additional disabilities. Henshaws partnered with Manchester Methodist Housing Group on the six-flat scheme.

In June 2001, due to lack of demand and a shortage of nursing staff, the Pendleton registered as a residential home only. Also in June, the Blackley Centre announced it was going to close permanently. The Merseyside Resource Centre moved next door and spread over three floors. In 2002 ownership of Henshaws Belmont Hotel was transferred to the Royal Society for the Blind. In September, the 12-week, pre-vocational Skillstep to Success course started at the Manchester centre. The School of Visual Impairment Studies became known as the Training & Professional Development Centre.

In 2003, the pre-vocational training Skillstep to Success course opened at John Derby House, Manchester. The Patient Support Service expanded to eye hospitals and clinics in Bolton, Eccles and Wythenshawe.

In 2004, the pre-vocational Skillstep to Success course was established in all four Henshaws regions. The first house in Greater Manchester opened to accommodate six college leavers and a house was purchased in Gateshead. Two new and improved houses replaced four older ones in Harrogate. Henshaws won a Visionary Design Award as the most accessible website of any visual impairment organisation.

In 2005, the Children and Family Services were established in all four Henshaws regions. The first four Skillstep students at Wakefield graduated from the course. Red Admiral Court in Newcastle upon Tyne opened in December with three service users.

In 2014, possible sexual assaults and sexual abuse by Jimmy Savile at Henshaws were investigated as part of Operation Yewtree. The independent report on behalf of the Department for Education found "None of the investigations [at different organisations] have been able to reach firm conclusions about whether the alleged abuse took place or not. Although many of them say the informant was credible, the lack of corroborating evidence has prevented them from reaching a definitive conclusion".

== Original aims ==
The object of the charity is the relief of the blind and partially sighted persons in all or any of the following ways:

- Accommodations for blind and partially sighted persons in need of residential care.
- Handicap centre or centres for blind and partially sighted persons.
- Education for blind and partially sighted young persons.
- Vocational training for blind and partially sighted persons.
- Employment for blind and partially sighted persons.
- Holiday accommodation for blind and partially sighted persons
- Accommodations for the spouse of any blind or partially sighted person residing in the charity centre.

== Current situation ==
Henshaws Society for Blind People today provides a comprehensive range of residential, education training and community care services for blind and partially sighted people of all ages in the North of England.

=== Henshaws College ===
Henshaws College in Harrogate provides vocational education and training opportunities for one hundred visually impaired students living both on and off campus, many of whom also have additional physical and learning disabilities. The majority of courses offered are aimed at maximizing independence skills.

=== Supported living and community housing ===
As a Registered Social Landlord, Henshaws owns and manages a wide range of accommodations. Yew Tree Lane in Northenden is the only residential home for young visually impaired people in the Greater Manchester area. It offers residential care, personal support and individual development on a permanent or a respite basis for people with learning disabilities, physical disabilities and/or a visual impairment.

=== Crown Green Road in Eccles ===
Crown Green Road is a block of self-contained flats, specially adapted for visually impaired people in their 20s to 50s. Residents receive support from a support worker three hours per week. These closed in 2017, ending housing support in Manchester.

=== Community housing ===
Henshaws currently have 17 community houses in Harrogate and Knaresborough for young people, many of whom are former Henshaws College students.

=== Resource centres ===
Henshaws has two resource centres in Liverpool and Manchester that support local communities through Information and Advice, Social and Self-help Groups, Informal Learning and Accredited Learning.

In Liverpool and Manchester, popular information technology and pre-vocational guidance courses meet the needs of visually impaired people. The centre has a range of specialist equipment for purchase or demonstration.

The Manchester centre closed in December 2017 when the charity moved to new offices on Talbot Road. The Liverpool office closed in May 2019, with the charity providing no drop in services in the North West area.

=== Community outreach centres ===
The Greater Manchester Resource Centre offers outreach services providing information, advice and support.

At the Manchester Royal Eye Hospital, the Patient Support Service provides post-diagnosis and other counseling.

In Salford, the Community Outreach Worker works closely with Salford Social Services and volunteers to reduce social isolation, increase confidence and improve quality of life for older people with a visual impairment.

Henshaws Children and Family Services offers a range of support, social and training activities throughout the year with young people up to age 18.

Both Resource Centres are stocked with specialist toys, contain soft play areas and sensory stimulation rooms.

Following recent takeovers of Bolton, Oldham and Tameside societies for blind people, Henshaws now offers a small amount of services from each of these areas, including assessments & benefits support.

=== Rehabilitation services ===
Henshaws contract with a number of social services across North West England to supply rehabilitation services. The rehabilitation officers provide training in daily living skills to help visually impaired people achieve greater independence. This is entitled 'Pathway to Wellbeing' and has been funded by a National Lottery grant since 2013.

=== Professional training ===
Henshaws Training and Professional Development Centre (formerly known as the School of Visual Impairment Studies) is based at College and delivers full and part-time professional training courses for Rehabilitation Officers and others working with the visually impaired.

The Visual Impairment Awareness Training scheme has been undertaken by many health and social services personnel, schools and colleges, voluntary agencies and commercial organisations.

== College incident ==
In August 2018, the charity wrote to 14 families informing them that their child would not be able to attend the college for the new term, due to begin in September 2018. This was due to the charity's failure to hire the required number of staff to ensure the children's safety. Penalties charged by local councils and lost income cost the charity over £500,000.

== See also ==
- Bradbury Fields – another North West visual impairment charity and member of the 800 Group.

== Sources ==
- UK CPI inflation numbers based on data available from Lawrence H. Officer (2010) "What Were the UK Earnings and Prices Then?" MeasuringWorth.
- "Oldham". UK Genealogy Archives. 1894–5. Retrieved March 17, 2011.
- "School's history lesson". Oldham Evening Chronicle. May 22, 2009. Retrieved March 17, 2011.
- Peter Shapely. "Charity and the 'Market" The Case of Henshaw's Blind Asyslum". Manchester Centre for Regional History Retrieved March 17, 2011.
- "A Brief History ". Henshaws Society for Blind People. Retrieved March 17, 2011.
- "". Family 'distraught' over Henshaws Specialist College place suspension. Retrieved May 10, 2019
