= Fairacres, Roehampton =

Residential building in Roehampton, London, England

Coordinates: 51.461090°N 0.24419404°W

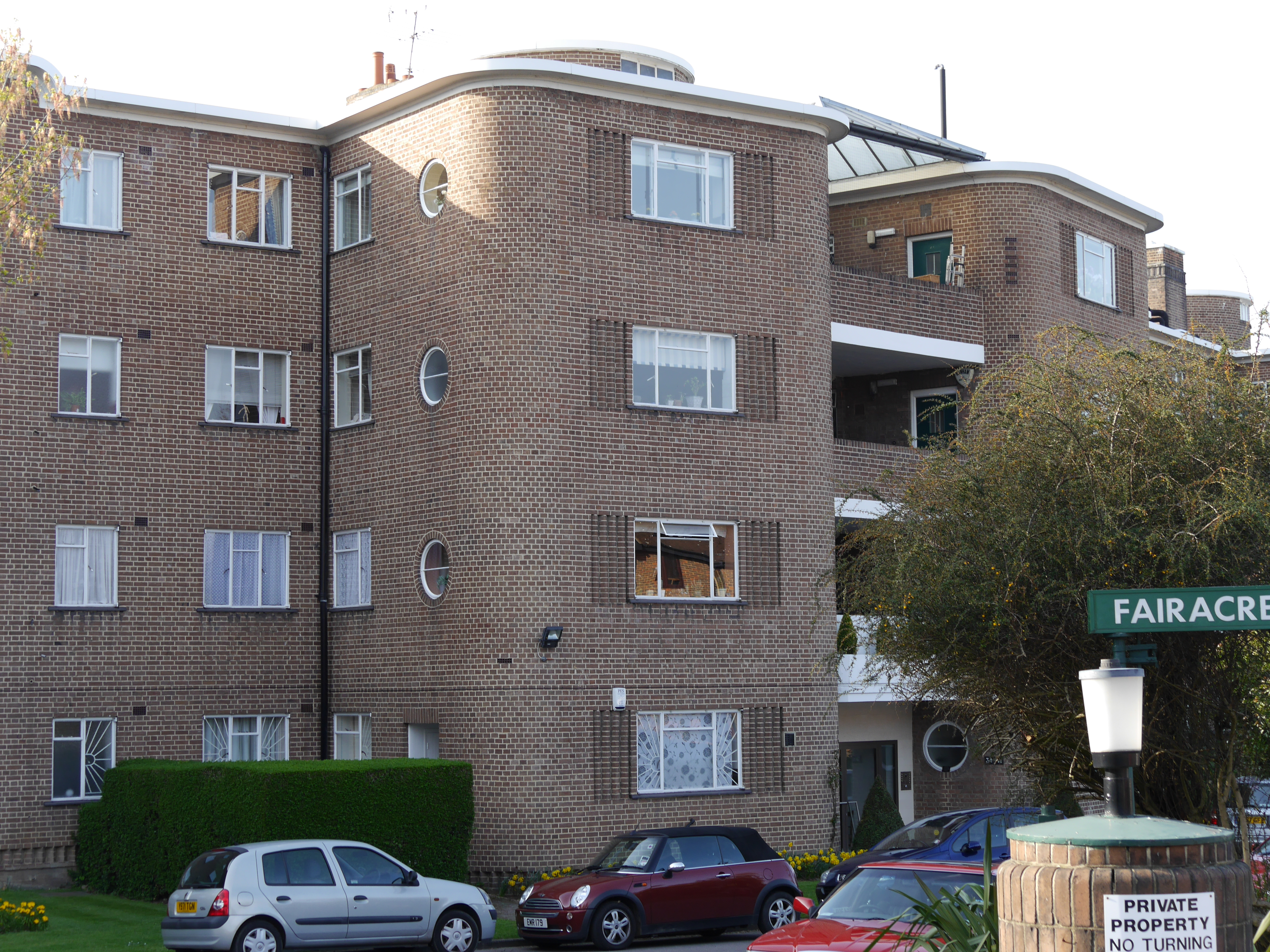
Fairacres, Roehampton

Fairacres is a Grade II listed four-storey apartment block at Roehampton Lane, Roehampton, London.

It was built in 1936 by the architects Anthony Minoprio (1900–1988) and Hugh Spencely (1900–1983), for the property developer Charles Kearley. The block of 64 flats in a semi-elliptical arc is modern in style with 1930s curved walls, but traditional in construction. It is very little altered since being built.

There are six acres of private gardens, overlooking the Roehampton Club grounds (and with a secure private entrance) and Richmond Park beyond. Each flat was built with 3–5 bedrooms, 2–3 bathrooms, drawing room, dining room and servant's quarters.
