= Advisory Service for Squatters =

Squatter self-help group in London, England

Coordinates: 51.5161°N 0.0707°W

- Predecessor: Family Squatters Advisory Service
- Founded: 1975
- Location(s): Angel Alley, 84B Whitechapel High Street; London, E1 7QX
- Region served: United Kingdom
- Services: Legal and practical advice to squatters
- Website: www.squatter.org.uk

The Advisory Service for Squatters (A.S.S.) is a non-profit group based in London and run by volunteers. It aims to provide practical advice and legal support for squatters. It was founded in 1975, having grown out of the Family Squatters Advisory Service. After being based for many years in St. Paul's Road in Islington, A.S.S. moved its offices to Whitechapel High Street, in the same building as Freedom Press.

== History ==
In the late 1960s, the Family Squatters Advisory Service (FSAS) was founded in London, England, to help defend the rights of squatters. In the 1973 case of McPhail vs. Persons Unknown, the Court of Appeal stated that a landowner could re-enter a squatted property and use reasonable force to evict those occupying the property, while remaining exempt from the Forcible Entry Act. Thus, as a result of this ruling, all power lay in the hands of the possessor of the property, rather than the occupants. This case sparked a division amongst those fighting for squatters' rights at the FSAS, for new-wave advocates thought that the FSAS did not do enough to protect the unlicensed squatters' rights. The division gave rise to a different organization called the All London Squatters (ALS). The ALS was geared more toward direct action and was open to licensed and unlicensed squatters, thus it was perceived as more militant. As tensions heightened in London, FSAS split even further. The division between those for and opposed to unlicensed squatters grew deeper, and by 1975, splits within the group led to its dissolution and the Advisory Service for Squatters (A.S.S.) was formed by one faction.

A spokesperson for the group told The Independent in 2003 "Today's squatters are highly organised and efficient. Many have full-time work, and drug problems are rare." Speaking to The Independent in 2011, A.S.S. estimated that there were between 15,000 and 17,000 squatters across the UK. Squatting in residential buildings was criminalised in England and Wales in 2012 by the Legal Aid, Sentencing and Punishment of Offenders Act 2012, prompting A.S.S. and the campaign group Squatters' Action for Secure Homes (SQUASH) to release advice on the changed legal situation. A representative of A.S.S. told Vice News in 2020 that the COVID-19 pandemic in the United Kingdom had resulted in a general increase of illegal evictions by bailiffs and members of the public in London. The Metropolitan Police responded that for most bailiff actions the police were not involved.

== Squatters Handbook ==
The A.S.S. publishes the Squatters Handbook which both serves as a guide for how and where to squat and explains the legal issues involved. 150,000 copies have been sold since 1976. The thirteenth edition was published in 2009, and the fourteenth in October, 2016. The Squatters' Handbook details guidelines on how to find property to squat in, what to do in confrontations with the police, how to maintain the property and set up temporary plumbing, and generally how to survive while squatting. It can be purchased for a small fee from the Advisory Service.

== Media controversies ==
In June 2008, the A.S.S. was subject to controversy in the mainstream media after Eric Pickles, Conservative MP for Brentwood and Ongar, criticised councils for listing the Squatters Handbook and contact details for A.S.S. on their websites. He said "Homeowners will be horrified that town halls are giving squatters the green light to break into law-abiding citizens’ homes [...] Promoting such lawlessness is breathtaking, but is sadly an indictment of social breakdown that has become rife under Labour and the prevalence of human rights laws." Durham County Council was one of seven councils reported to be recommending the guide.

In response, the A.S.S. issued a press release explaining that councils listed it "because we offer free advice to homeless people and those with housing problems [...] A.S.S does not promote lawlessness, as squatting is still legal. We help disadvantaged people to find housing, to help themselves when no-one else will. We often recommend that people who are eligible for Priority Need Housing apply to their local Council."

In 2011, an A.S.S. volunteer won a case (Voyias v Information Commissioner and the London Borough of Camden EA/2011/0007) against Camden Council and the Information Commissioner's Office which compelled the council to release a list of empty properties. The Daily Mail then wrote an article entitled "Professional agencies marketing empty homes to potential squatters?" which criticised the decision, leading A.S.S. to respond that the article was "misleading and inaccurate". The following year, A.S.S. responded to two Daily Mail articles written by Max Hastings and Andrew Levy which both talked about "Moldovan squatters", describing them as lacking in evidence and "clearly designed to stir up tensions against people because of their nationality".

== See also ==
- Squatting in England and Wales
- Social centres in the United Kingdom
