= Industrial and provident society =

Type of corporate entity originating in Britain

An industrial and provident society (IPS) is a body corporate registered for carrying on any industries, businesses, or trades specified in or authorised by its rules.

The members of a society benefit from the protection of limited liability much like other corporate forms, but unlike companies for example, each member will normally only have one vote at a General Meeting regardless of their shareholding. The governance of a society is therefore democratically oriented rather than financially oriented.

The legal form originated in the United Kingdom of Great Britain and Ireland and became the traditional legal form taken by trading organisations with democratic governance including:

- co-operatives (which trade for the benefit of their members);
- societies for the benefit of the community (which trade for the benefit of the broader community).

In Great Britain the Co-operative and Community Benefit Societies Act 2014 and Co-operative and Community Benefit Societies and Credit Unions Act 2010 renamed these societies as co-operative or community benefit societies.

The term industrial and provident society is still used in statute in New Zealand, the Republic of Ireland and within the UK in Northern Ireland.

== History 1852 to 2014 ==
The first legislative basis for industrial and provident societies arose in the Industrial and Provident Societies Partnership Act 1852 (15 & 16 Vict. c. 31).

Industrial and Provident Societies (Amendment) Act 1895 (Note: Section 1.)
- Act of Parliament
- Parliament of the United Kingdom
- Long title: An Act to amend the Industrial and Provident Societies Act, 1893.
- Citation: 58 & 59 Vict. c. 30
- Territorial extent: United Kingdom

Dates
- Royal assent: 6 July 1895
- Commencement: 6 July 1895 (Note: The Acts of Parliament (Commencement) Act 1793.)
- Repealed: 1 January 1966 (Note: The Industrial and Provident Societies Act 1965 (Commencement) Order 1965 (SI 1965/2051).)
Other legislation
Amends	Industrial and Provident Societies Act 1893
Repealed by	Industrial and Provident Societies Act 1965

Status: Repealed

Text of statute as originally enacted

Industrial and Provident Societies (Amendment) Act 1913 (Note: Section 12(1).)
- Act of Parliament
- Parliament of the United Kingdom
- Long title: An Act to amend the Industrial and Provident Societies Act, 1893.
- Citation: 3 & 4 Geo. 5. c. 31
- Territorial extent: United Kingdom

Dates
- Royal assent: 15 August 1913
- Commencement: 1 January 1914 (Note: Section 12(2).)
- Repealed: England and Wales and Scotland: 1 January 1966; Northern Ireland:
Other legislation
Amends	Industrial and Provident Societies Act 1893
Amended by	Industrial and Provident Societies (Amendment) Act 1954
Repealed by	England and Wales and Scotland: Industrial and Provident Societies Act 1965; Northern Ireland: Industrial and Provident Societies Act (Northern Ireland) 1969

Status: Repealed

Text of statute as originally enacted

The legislation was subsequently amended and consolidated by the Industrial and Provident Societies Act 1862 (25 & 26 Vict. c. 87), the Industrial and Provident Societies Act 1876 (39 & 40 Vict. c. 45) and most recently the Industrial and Provident Societies Act 1893 (56 & 57 Vict. c. 39), which was amended by the Industrial and Provident Societies (Amendment) Act 1895 (58 & 59 Vict. c. 30) and the Industrial and Provident Societies (Amendment) Act 1913 (3 & 4 Geo. 5. c. 31) and still forms the basis of the law on societies in the Republic of Ireland.

The Industrial and Provident Societies Act 1908 (No. 81) was passed by the New Zealand Parliament on 4 August 1908, and forms the basis of the law on societies in New Zealand.

In 1965, an act of Parliament came into effect called the Industrial and Provident Societies Act 1965 (c. 12).

Friendly and Industrial and Provident Societies Act 1968 (Audit Exemption) (Amendment) Order 2006
- Statutory Instrument
- Parliament of the United Kingdom
- Citation: SI 2006/265
- Territorial extent: United Kingdom

Dates
- Made: 7 February 2006
- Commencement: 6 April 2006
Other legislation
Amends	Friendly and Industrial and Provident Societies Act 1968
Made under	Industrial and Provident Societies Act 2002

Status: Current legislation

Text of statute as originally enacted

Text of the Friendly and Industrial and Provident Societies Act 1968 (Audit Exemption) (Amendment) Order 2006 as in force today (including any amendments) within the United Kingdom, from legislation.gov.uk.

The Friendly and Industrial and Provident Societies Act 1968 (Audit Exemption) (Amendment) Order 2006 (SI 2006/265) increased the audit exemption threshold level for industrial and provident societies to £5.6 million. Also the Charities Act 2006 removed certain exemptions of charitable IPSs in England and Wales. From that point, charitable IPSs had to register with both the FCA and the Charity Commission, except registered social landlords, who register with the Tenant Services Authority.

Since 2010 the IPS laws explicitly name co-operatives in their titles.

Legislative Reform (Industrial and Provident Societies and Credit Unions) Order 2011 (Note: Section 1(1).)
- Statutory Instrument
- Parliament of the United Kingdom
- Citation: SI 2011/2687
- Territorial extent: England and Wales; Scotland; Northern Ireland (article 22)

Dates
- Made: 8 November 2011
- Commencement: 8 January 2012 (rest of act)
Other legislation
Amends	Industrial and Provident Societies Act 1965; Friendly and Industrial and Provident Societies Act 1968; Credit Unions Act 1979
Made under	Legislative and Regulatory Reform Act 2006

Status: Current legislation

Text of statute as originally enacted

Text of the Legislative Reform (Industrial and Provident Societies and Credit Unions) Order 2011 as in force today (including any amendments) within the United Kingdom, from legislation.gov.uk.

In 2011, the Legislative Reform (Industrial and Provident Societies and Credit Unions) Order 2011 (SI 2011/2687) increased the maximum shareholding limit, changed the date of submission of the annual return, permitted children to be members, and allows the publication of unaudited interim accounts.

In January 2012, the UK Prime Minister, David Cameron announced a project to consolidate all the legislation applicable to industrial and provident societies to be passed by 2015. There was some uncertainty as to how far new developments would address the problems with the legislation. Cameron stated, "We know that breaking monopolies, encouraging choice, opening up new forms of enterprise is not just right for business but the best way of improving public services too." Ed Mayo, Secretary General of Co-operatives UK, welcomed the project. In mid-2012, revision of laws for co-operative was in its early stages. Some felt the reforms did not deal with certain key problems.

Changes to the registration system under the Financial Services Act 2012 which splits the Financial Services Authority into the Financial Conduct Authority (FCA) and the Prudential Regulation Authority (PRA) took effect on 1 April 2013. The registration function for societies was transferred to the FCA while the prudential regulation of credit unions was transferred to the PRA. In September 2013, the English and Scottish Law Commissions published a draft consolidation bill and related documents for consultation. Earlier that year, the UK Treasury, which is the department responsible for legislation for societies, published a series of proposals to increase the holding limit for withdrawable share capital in societies to at least £31,000, to apply insolvency rescue procedures to societies, and to change the rules applicable to their registers of members. Draft regulations linked to that consultation were also available, having been circulated to a small number of people. Those drafts and other materials, including a private member's bill to liberalise the use of share capital by societies presented to the UK House of Lords were explained and brought together online.

A new Co-operative and Community Benefit Societies Act 2014 received royal assent in 2014.

== Regulation ==
In the United Kingdom, IPSs are registered (but not regulated) by the Financial Conduct Authority (FCA), which took over the job from the Registrar of Friendly Societies when it was part of the Financial Services Authority (FSA) (both being supervised by the Treasury). Society registration is quite separate from the FCA's function of regulating financial institutions.

Such businesses have been controlled in the past by the Industrial and Provident Societies Partnership Act 1852, the Industrial and Provident Societies Act 1893 (56 & 57 Vict. c. 39), and the Industrial and Provident Societies Act 1965.

The legislation in the Republic of Ireland is based on modifications of the UK Industrial and Provident Societies Act 1893 (56 & 57 Vict. c. 39).

=== Legislation ===
- Industrial and Provident Societies Partnership Act 1852
- Industrial and Provident Societies Act 1893 (56 & 57 Vict. c. 39)
- Industrial and Provident Societies (Amendment) Act 1913
- Industrial and Provident Societies Act 1965 (c. 12)
- Industrial and Provident Societies Act 2002 (c. 20)
- Co-operative and Community Benefit Societies Act 2003
- Co-operative and Community Benefit Societies and Credit Unions Act 2010
- Financial Services Act 2012
- Co-operative and Community Benefit Societies Act 2014

== Forms of financial capital: Community shares ==
Unlike a company limited by guarantee (another form favoured by businesses not primarily motivated by profit), an IPS always has a share capital. However, in an IPS the shares cannot usually increase in value beyond their nominal amount. Often, no interest or dividend is payable on them at all, and they are voting shares only. The capital of an IPS is therefore not made up of equity shares like those in a company limited by shares, which appreciate or fall in value with the success of the enterprise that issues them. Rather they are par-value shares, which can only be redeemed (if at all) at face value. The profits and losses of an IPS are thus the common property of the members. The share often acts as no more than a "membership ticket", and voting is on a "one member one vote" basis.

Working capital is usually provided through non-voting shares, and these are often withdrawable. Withdrawable share capital is an unusual form of finance which is treated as equity but may be withdrawn subject to specified conditions. It has the great advantage of being exempt from the Financial Services and Markets Act, which makes the sale of securities to the public a criminal offence without compliance with expensive and onerous regulations. However, an IPS with withdrawable share capital is not allowed to carry on a banking business, presumably because a withdrawable share capital would make it impractical to ensure capital adequacy requirements are continuously met. The terms of society shares, whether withdrawable or not, may include the payment of interest on the capital, but this may only be paid out of profits.

The maximum individual withdrawable shareholding is currently set at £100,000 (although other IPSs may hold more shares than this). The limit used to include non-withdrawable shares, but this was removed in 2011. Since 2006, the FCA has been willing, in principle, to permit co-operative societies to have non-user investor members providing certain conditions are met and this, in combination with the removal of the £100,000 holding limit for non-withdrawable shares, may open up wider possibilities for co-operatives to raise finance from investors while maintaining user control.

Since 2012, the use of withdrawable share capital by community benefit societies has been commonly described as 'community shares'. Over £150 million has been raised in community shares by over 440 community owned businesses across the UK. Recent research has shown that this model has proven very resilient, with 92% of all businesses who have raised capital through community shares still trading to date. As community share offers are exempt from formal regulation, the Community Shares Unit (CSU) oversees best practice standards, intelligence and development of the community shares market. The CSU is a formal partnership between Co-operatives UK, Locality and The Plunkett Foundation.

In depth guidance on the legislation and best practice standards on running community share offers is available from The Community Shares Handbook.

== Examples ==
=== Community benefit societies ===
- Broadband 4 Rural North
- F.C. United of Manchester
- Hull United A.F.C.
- Fordhall Community Land Initiative
- Greater Manchester Tree Station
- Manchester United Supporters' Trust
- RLLMUK

=== Co-operatives ===
- Ethical Consumer Research Association
- Shared Interest

=== Housing associations ===
- Canopy Housing
- Empty Homes Agency
- Great Places
- Hannover Housing Association
- Home Group
- Stonewater Ltd.
- Whitefryars Housing Group

== See also ==
- Community interest company
