= Co-operative and Community Benefit Societies and Credit Unions Act 2010 =

Act of the Parliament of the United Kingdom

Co-operative and Community Benefit Societies and Credit Unions Act 2010 (Note: Section 8(1).)
- Act of Parliament
- Parliament of the United Kingdom
- Long title: An Act to make provision for societies to be registered as co-operative or community benefit societies and to re-name the Industrial and Provident Societies Acts; to apply to registered societies the provisions relating to directors disqualification and to make provision for the application of certain other enactments relating to companies; to confer power to make provision for credit unions corresponding to any provision applying to building societies; and for connected purposes.
- Citation: 2010 c. 7
- Introduced by: Malcolm Wicks MP (Commons); Lord Tomlinson (Lords)
- Territorial extent: Great Britain; Northern Ireland (in part); (Note: Section 8(4)–(6).)

Dates
- Royal assent: 18 March 2010
- Commencement: Various (Note: Section 8(2)–(3).)
Other legislation
Amends	Industrial and Provident Societies Act 1965; Company Directors Disqualification Act 1986
Amended by	Co-operative and Community Benefit Societies Act 2014

Status: Partially repealed

History of passage through Parliament

Text of statute as originally enacted

Revised text of statute as amended

The Co-operative and Community Benefit Societies and Credit Unions Act 2010 (c. 7) is an act of the Parliament of the United Kingdom that received royal assent on 18 March 2010.

== Provisions ==
The act contains the following provisions:

- Industrial and provident societies can be registered as a co-operative society or a community benefit society. The act did not create a way to convert between the different types of society.
- Like companies, organisations registered as societies under the Industrial and Provident Societies Act 1965 will be subject to the Company Directors Disqualification Act 1986. Board or Management Committee members will be treated like company directors.
- Societies registered under the 1965 act may be made subject to additional Companies Act 2006 provisions, following consultation, which may relate to: Investigations of companies, company names, dissolution and restoration to the register.
- Renames related acts including 'Industrial and Provident Societies Act 1965' to 'Co-operative and Community Benefit Societies and Credit Unions Act 1965'.

== Parliamentary process ==
The bill was first presented (first reading) in the House of Lords on 19 November 2009 and received its third reading on 14 January 2010. It was first read in the House of Commons on 14 January 2010 and received its third reading on 12 March 2010.

== Implementation ==
The implementation of the act formed part of the Big Society agenda.

== See also ==
- Co-operative and Community Benefit Societies Act 2014
- Industrial and provident society
