= Thomas Henshaw (benefactor) =

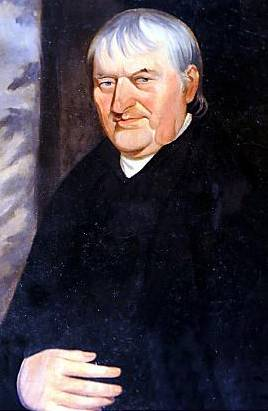
Thomas Henshaw

Thomas Henshaw (1731–1810) was an English hatter from Oldham, Lancashire. He bequeathed the funds for the foundation of The Blue Coat School in Oldham and Henshaws Society for Blind People.

== Early life ==
Henshaw was born in 1731 at Prestbury, Cheshire, one of seven children. His parents, John and Martha Henshaw, owned and farmed a small estate in Butts Lane, Prestbury. Henshaw's father died when he was two years old. Henshaw was the youngest surviving child in his family.

At an early age Henshaw was put to work with his brother Henry on a farm in Derbyshire. He subsequently left his brother in possession of the farm, and around 1755 he became an apprentice to John Fletcher, a hat manufacturer in Oldham. After serving his apprenticeship, Thomas left Oldham for Manchester, where he became part-owner of a dye works.

Around 1770, Henshaw returned to Oldham and entered into a partnership with his old master, John Fletcher. His brother, Henry Henshaw, joined the partnership a couple of years later. In time Thomas and Henry Henshaw set up their own business in the hatting trade and established a manufacturing works on what is now Henshaw Street in Oldham.

== Businessman and public benefactor ==
The Henshaws "were remarkable for their habits of industry and frugality" and as a result of their "almost unceasing attention to business" their hat works became the largest in the district, with about 300 workers. They became importers of beaver and fur, which were used extensively in the hatting trade, and developed other subsidiary interests. From an initial capital of £2,000, the Henshaws eventually accumulated a fortune of £154,000.

The Henshaws were considerate towards their workers. They established schools for the education of the workers' children, and they encouraged their attendance at church. They were liberal benefactors of local charities and undertakings, making regular donations to the Manchester Infirmary and the Lunatic Hospital, and were associated with the construction of new roads.

The brothers were also the first people to establish Sunday Schools in Lancashire. They hired schoolmasters, and reading and writing were taught on Sunday. This would have been the only formal education that most of the children ever received.

In 1754, Thomas Henshaw married Hannah Taylor. Their only child, Henry, was born the following year and died at age ten. Hannah Henshaw died in 1775.

== Later years, death, and legacy ==
In 1799, at the age of 68, Thomas Henshaw married Sarah Mayers. From then until his death in 1810, Henshaw lived either at Higher Groves or at his wife's house at Hamer Hill in Blackley.

Henshaw had a severe attack of paralysis in 1800, and after that was depressed and irresponsible at times. Despite his state of health, he often rode on horseback in the neighborhood of Blackley, and he continued to deal with his business at Hargreaves Works. His main preoccupation, however, was the framing of his will.

In 1807, Thomas made his will, which bequeathed £20,000 (£2 million as of 2023) to establish a charity school in Oldham and £20,000 for the foundation of an asylum for the blind in Manchester. In a codicil dated May 1808, he appointed trustees for both the school and the asylum.

In the early morning of Sunday 4 March 1810, Henshaw was found drowned in a reservoir near his works. He was 79. At the inquest, held the following day, medical evidence was given that he had been subject to attacks of mental derangement. The verdict brought in by the jury was that he had drowned himself, "and that the Cause of his having so drowned himself was his insanity." Henshaw was buried on 10 March in Prestwich Church.

His widow contested Henshaw's will on the grounds that he had made it whilst mentally unbalanced. The matter was referred to the Court of Chancery and 23 years later the court ruled that the will was valid. This freed the funds in Henshaw's estate to be applied to founding the school and asylum, and this was done. The Blue Coat School was established in 1834, and Henshaws Society for Blind People in 1837.
