= Industrial and Provident Societies Act 1965 =

Act of the Parliament of the United Kingdom

Industrial and Provident Societies Act 1965 (Note: Section 78(1).)
- Act of Parliament
- Parliament of the United Kingdom
- Long title: An Act to consolidate certain enactments relating to industrial and provident societies, being those enactments as they apply in Great Britain and the Channel Islands with corrections and improvements made under the Consolidation of Enactments (Procedure) Act 1949.
- Citation: 1965 c. 12
- Territorial extent: England and Wales; Scotland; Channel Islands; (Note: Section 78(2).)

Dates
- Royal assent: 2 June 1965
- Commencement: 1 January 1966 (Note: Section 78(3). The Industrial and Provident Societies Act 1965 (Commencement) Order 1965 (SI 1965/2051).)
- Repealed: 1 August 2014
Other legislation
Amends	See § Repealed enactments
Repeals/revokes	See § Repealed enactments
Amended by	Family Law Reform Act 1969; Statute Law (Repeals) Act 1974; Co-operatives and Community Benefit Societies Act 2003; Mental Capacity Act 2005; Co-operative and Community Benefit Societies and Credit Unions Act 2010; Charities Act 2011; Legislative Reform (Industrial and Provident Societies and Credit Unions) Order 2011
Repealed by	Co-operative and Community Benefit Societies Act 2014
Relates to	Friendly and Industrial and Provident Societies Act 1968; Industrial and Provident Societies Act 1975; Industrial and Provident Societies Act 1978

Status: Repealed

Text of statute as originally enacted

Revised text of statute as amended

The Industrial and Provident Societies Act 1965 (c. 12) was an act of the Parliament of the United Kingdom that regulated industrial and provident societies in Great Britain and the Channel Islands.

From 1 August 2014 it was repealed and replaced by the consolidating Co-operative and Community Benefit Societies Act 2014.

The Co-operative and Community Benefit Societies and Credit Unions Act 2010 contained a provision that would have renamed the act the Co-operative and Community Benefit Societies and Credit Unions Act 1965, but this was repealed on 1 August 2014 before coming into force.

== History ==
In the UK, and some Commonwealth countries, many co-operatives are registered as industrial and provident societies. Since 2014 the applicable laws now explicitly name co-operatives and community benefit societies in their titles.

In January 2012 the UK Prime Minister, David Cameron announced a project to consolidate all the legislation applicable to industrial and provident societies. There was some uncertainty as to how far new developments would address the problems with the legislation. In mid-2012, revision of laws for co-operative was in its early stages. The enactment of the Co-operative and Community Benefit Societies Act 2014 completed the reform process.

== Jurisdiction ==
This legislation applies in Great Britain (England, Wales, and Scotland). Northern Ireland has its own very similar legislation. The 1965 and 1968 acts also apply to Jersey and Guernsey.

== Provisions ==
=== Repealed enactments ===
Section 77(1) of the act repealed 15 enactments, listed in schedule 5 to the act.

Enactments repealed by section 77(1)
Citation	Short title	Extent of repeal
56 & 57 Vict. c. 39	Industrial and Provident Societies Act 1893	The whole act.
57 & 58 Vict. c. 8	Industrial and Provident Societies Act 1894	The whole act.
58 & 59 Vict. c. 30	Industrial and Provident Societies (Amendment) Act 1895	The whole act.
3 & 4 Geo. 5. c. 31	Industrial and Provident Societies (Amendment) Act 1913	The whole act.
15 & 16 Geo. 5. c. 20	Law of Property Act 1925	In section 115(9), the words " industrial or provident ".
18 & 19 Geo. 5. c. 4	Industrial and Provident Societies (Amendment) Act 1928	The whole act.
3 & 4 Geo. 6. c. 19	Societies (Miscellaneous Provisions) Act 1940	In section 8(1), the words from "or any " to " 1928 ".
3 & 4 Geo. 6. c. 19	Societies (Miscellaneous Provisions) Act 1940	In section 10(1), in the definition of "society", the words from " any society registered " to " 1928 ".
11 & 12 Geo. 6. c. 39	Industrial Assurance and Friendly Societies Act 1948	Section 18(3)(d).
11 & 12 Geo. 6. c. 39	Industrial Assurance and Friendly Societies Act 1948	In section 19(5), the words from " or in any of the " to the end of paragraph (c).
11 & 12 Geo. 6. c. 39	Industrial Assurance and Friendly Societies Act 1948	In section 20(1), the words from "and of " to " 1893 " and paragraph (c).
11 & 12 Geo. 6. c. 39	Industrial Assurance and Friendly Societies Act 1948	In section 20(2), the words from " or under" to " 1893 ".
11 & 12 Geo. 6. c. 39	Industrial Assurance and Friendly Societies Act 1948	In section 21, the words from "and of " to " 1893 ".
14 Geo. 6. c. 34	Housing (Scotland) Act 1950	Section 79(2), from "and, notwithstanding " onwards.
15 & 16 Geo. 6 & 1 Eliz. 2. c. 17	Industrial and Provident Societies Act 1952	The whole act.
2 & 3 Eliz. 2. c. 43	Industrial and Provident Societies (Amendment) Act 1954	The whole act.
5 & 6 Eliz. 2. c. 56	Housing Act 1957	Section 119(4).
6 & 7 Eliz. 2. c. 45	Prevention of Fraud (Investments) Act 1958	Section 10.
7 & 8 Eliz. 2. c. 72	Mental Health Act 1959	So much of Schedule 5 as relates to the Industrial and Provident Societies Act 1893.
9 & 10 Eliz. 2. c. 28	Industrial and Provident Societies Act 1961	The whole act.

== Subsequent developments ==
Section 77(1) of, and schedule 5 to, the act were repealed by section 1 of, and part XI of the schedule to, the Statute Law (Repeals) Act 1974, which came into force on 27 June 1974.

The whole act was repealed by section 154 of, and schedule 7 to, the Co-operative and Community Benefit Societies Act 2014, which came into force on 1 August 2014.

== See also ==
- Co-operative and Community Benefit Societies Act 2014
- Co-operative and Community Benefit Societies Act 2003
