= Stonewater Ltd =

English housing Association

Stonewater Ltd is a housing association formed by the merger of Raglan Housing and Jephson Group in 2015. Stonewater owns and manages over 39,000 homes and has a turnover of £191 million.

== Raglan ==
Raglan Housing owned and managed more than 12,300 affordable homes in 95 local authority areas, mainly concentrated across the south east, south west and midlands and east of England. Raglan raises funding through a bond taken up by an independent bulk annuity provider.

Raglan properties are a mix of new homes in inner city, urban and rural areas for general rental and shared ownership. Raglan also redevelop redundant brownfield sites and empty properties in support of town center regeneration and provide supported and sheltered housing along with specialist women's refuges.

The association also manages housing for the disabled and shelters for the homeless.

Each June the Association's employees participate in a "cleanup-paintup" event, volunteering their time to improve the housing in their communities.

Raglan Housing Association is a Charitable Industrial and Provident Society (no 20558R, registered with the Homes and Communities Agency (HCA) (no L1556).

=== Background ===
In the 1960s two voluntary groups, the Inskip League of Friendship and Poole and East Dorset Club for the Disabled, approached Poole Borough Council (now the Borough of Poole) to build housing for disabled people.

In 1976 registration with the Housing Corporation was completed and the name confirmed as Raglan Housing Association. In October 1993 Astra Housing Association merged with Raglan, increasing the Association's stock to nearly 6,000 homes. In 2001, with almost 9,000 homes, Raglan conducted an 18-month review of how services were provided to residents, resulting in the introduction of a centralised Housing Services Centre, a one-stop shop for all resident repair requests and enquiries.

=== Finance ===
During 2011 and 2012, Raglan’s annual turnover was £56m. The landlord was also accredited as Aa2 Credit Rating by Moody’s Investors Service prior to its bond being confirmed.

On 31 March 2012 the association had three wholly owned subsidiary companies: Raglan Developments (formerly Raglan Homes), to develop build-for-sale properties (dormant during 2011/12); Raglan Design and Build, to oversee new build projects; and Raglan Homes Limited, a new Industrial and Provident Society subsidiary, registered with the HCA, to raise finance to build new homes.

In May 2021 the association announced plans to move to home-based working with hubs based in Coventry, Reading and Bournemouth. Staff are offered an interest-free loan of up to £10,000 to creat defined workspaces in their homes.

== Jephson ==
Prior to the merger, the Jephson Group comprised Jephson Homes Housing Association Limited (JHHAL), Jephson Housing Association Limited (JHAL) and Marches Housing Association Limited (MHAL). It operated in most counties of England.

== Mount Green ==
A merger between Stonewater and Mount Green was announced in August 2023. On the 1st of February 2024, Mount Green Housing Association joined Stonewater in a partnership. This partnership saw the 1,650 home provider Mount Green join Stonewater.
