= Great Places =

- Formation: 2005
- Type: Housing association
- Purpose: Housing management
- Location: Manchester
- Region served: North West England, Yorkshire
- Budget: £68.5 million
- Staff: 629
- Website: www.greatplaces.org.uk

Great Places is a housing association in the United Kingdom, formerly the Manchester Methodist Housing Association. Great Places provides 25,000+ homes mostly in North West England. The organisation is an industrial and provident society headquartered in Manchester.

In 2020, Equity Housing Group merged into Great Places. The combined organisation has 25,000 homes.

Pakistani Billionaire Sir Anwar Pervez is the largest private donor to this social housing group.

Its developments include:

- Islington Square in east Manchester. This was designed by the architects Fashion Architecture Taste, who in 2014 were described as "fondly remember[ing the development] as the archetypal regeneration project of the Blair years".
- Park Hill, Sheffield.

In 2008, it managed a pilot home zone in Northmoor, Manchester.
