= Leeds Federated Housing Association =

Leeds Federated Housing Association was formed in 1974 and registered in 1975 by a number of smaller associations coming together to form a 'federation', for the benefit of the community. The idea was that by working together they could achieve more than as separate organisations. That philosophy has prevailed throughout Leeds Federated's history, with partnerships and joint working arrangements being a common feature of its work over the years.

The Association grew quickly through the 1970s and early 1980s with a lot of pre 1919 stock. Jim Coulter established the association and was the director for 12 years before going on to become the Chief Executive of the National Housing Federation. New build development was undertaken through Leeds Partnership Homes during the early 1990s, leading to the present day where its 4,500 homes are roughly half pre-1919 stock and half new build stock

Most of its homes are in Leeds, but through the 1990s they started developing outside Leeds and now have around 400 homes in Harrogate and 100 in Wakefield.

The association's aim is to provide a benefit to the whole community through the provision of housing and associated services. Most of its services are directed at renting homes people want to live in, for less than they could be rented from the private sector.

Leeds Federated engages in regeneration in the communities where it has stock, in order to help change communities to become places where people will choose to live.

In 2023, Leeds Federated completed the conversion of their previous office at Arthington House, 30 Westfield Road, Leeds LS3 1DE into affordable flats. Leeds Federated have now moved to offices at The Tannery, Kirkstall Road, Leeds.

The current Chief Executive is Matthew Walker, and the chair from 2002 to 2009 was Martin Dean who was succeeded by Eric Bowen. The current chair is Kim Brear who has been in post since 2021.
