= Action on Empty Homes =

UK charity

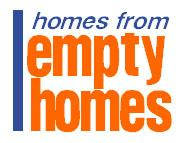
Empty Homes

The Action on Empty Homes was established in 1992 as the Empty Homes Agency by Antony Fletcher with assistance from Serge Lourie as a registered charity in England that works to help people create homes from empty properties and campaigns for more empty homes to be brought into use for the benefit of those in housing need. In 2010 it changed its operational name to Empty Homes. The founding director was Bob Lawrence. In 2018 it changed its name to Action on Empty Homes.

== The charity ==
The Empty Homes Agency is a charitable industrial and provident society, as well as a charitable housing association, and a member of the National Federation of Housing. It is a registered charity in England, No. 27697R, but is registered under the Industrial and Provident Societies Act 1965 and thus not registered with the Charity Commission.

Will McMahon was appointed as Director in May 2018.

== Publications ==
The charity publishes year statistics on the number of empty homes in England. In 2018 Action on Empty Homes estimated that there were 216,000 empty homes in the UK, the highest level for a decade. The charity has also put out numerous publications on how to bring empty properties back into use, for both owners as well as members of the public.

== Campaigns ==
The charity highlights the level of housing need in the UK and believes that bringing more empty homes into use provides more homes that in turn helps to ease housing need. The charity has mounted several campaigns aimed at changing government policy to help more empty homes to be brought into use.

=== Empty dwelling management orders ===
Its successes include successfully lobbying the government to introduce empty dwelling management orders (EDMOs) – legislation to enable local authorities to take over the management control of dwellings that have been empty for six months or more in a forced lease scheme. The legislation caused considerable controversy, although the orders have only been issued a handful of times since the legislation came into practice in 2006.

=== Cut the VAT ===
Empty Homes are part of the Cut the VAT Coalition which believes that reducing VAT from 17.5% to 5% for all maintenance and home improvement work would help the Government achieve its target of cutting carbon emissions by 60% by 2050, as well as encourage the refurbishment and use of empty properties. It has successfully persuaded government to change the rules on VAT, with discounts currently at 5%.

=== Council tax discount ===
In 2003, Empty Homes successfully lobbied for a campaign to allow councils to reduce of eliminate council tax discounts on empty properties, which David Ireland previously referred to as ‘nonsense’ on the charity's blog.

=== Ongoing campaigns ===
In 2010 Empty Homes successfully campaigned for additional public spending for bringing empty homes into use. The Government announced that it would allocate £100 million for schemes bringing empty homes into use as part of the comprehensive spending review. Following this funding, academic research has been published on 'empty homes' projects; for example, in 2016 an article in Public Money and Management which examined the dynamics of a successful collaborative 'empty homes' partnership comprising housing associations, social enterprises and local government.

The charity has been responsible for helping dozens of local authorities set up successful empty property strategies, and in 2010 was asked by the Homes and Communities Agency to help administer a comprehensive training programme to help several authorities that were struggling.
