= Charles Kearley =

British art collector

Charles Hudson Kearley
- Born: 11 June 1904; London, United Kingdom
- Died: 1989 (aged 84–85)
- Education: Gresham's School, Norfolk
- Occupations: Property developer & art collector

Charles Hudson Kearley (11 June 1904–1989), was an English property developer and art collector.

== Background and education ==
Kearley was educated at Gresham's School, Norfolk. His father, C. F. Kearley, was the brother of Hudson Ewbanke Kearley, 1st Viscount Devonport, and head of the firm of Kearley and Tonge, tea importers and jam manufacturers. C. F. Kearley had also gone into business as a builder and property developer, and his son Charles joined the firm after leaving school.

== Career ==
Kearley's influence appeared in the progressive buildings erected by the family firm. One important project was Fairacres at Roehampton, a group of modern flats. In 1936, Kearley asked the architect and artist Raymond Myerscough-Walker (1908–1984) to make drawings of a design by Minoprio & Spenceley. This was the beginning of a lifelong friendship, with Myerscough-Walker encouraging Kearley's enthusiasm for modern art, architecture and design. Kearley's next development was Kensal House, a block of modern flats in Ladbroke Grove where the ideas of Elizabeth Denby were realised by the architect Maxwell Fry.

Kearley inherited the business and undertook many projects, including designs by Myerscough-Walker and Maxwell Fry which are important examples of modern architecture.

== War ==
During the Second World War, Kearley was in a reserved occupation. He built airfields and also manufactured air-sea rescue boats.

== Interests ==
In the 1940s, Kearley moved to the Isle of Man, where he owned a hotel and also had a farm. He continued as a property developer, building flats in Portugal, the Canary Islands, and elsewhere. But his greatest interests were in yachting, owning racehorses, and in contemporary art.

== Art collection ==
Much of Kearley's art collection was bought on the advice of the critic R. H. Wilenski, a champion of modern art. The collection grew to include important works such as John Piper’s painting of a bombed-out church in Bristol, commissioned by the War Artists' Advisory Committee, and Ben Nicholson's ‘1946 (still life – cerulean)’. Continental 20th-century artists such as Paul Cézanne, André Derain, Gino Severini and Fernand Léger were also well represented.

In 1975 John Lomax designed a modern house at Hat Hill Copse to house Kearley's collection of modern art. The house is now the home of the Cass Sculpture Foundation. He had no children to leave his collection to, and he decided to bequeath it to the district of Chichester for its Pallant House Gallery, which had opened in 1982.
