= List of Consolidated Fund Acts from the 19th century =

This is a list of Consolidated Fund Acts from the 19th century.

== List ==
=== 19th century ===
==== 1800s ====
Consolidated Fund Act 1806
- Act of Parliament
- Parliament of the United Kingdom
- Citation: 46 Geo. 3. c. 44

- The Consolidated Fund Act 1806 (46 Geo. 3. c. 44)

==== 1810s ====
Consolidated Fund Act 1813
- Act of Parliament
- Parliament of the United Kingdom
- Citation: 53 Geo. 3. c. 16

Other legislation
- Repealed by: Statute Law Revision Act 1873

Status: Repealed

- The Consolidated Fund Act 1813 (53 Geo. 3. c. 16)

Consolidated Fund Act 1816
- Act of Parliament
- Parliament of the United Kingdom
- Long title: An Act to unite and consolidate into One Fund all the Public Revenues of Great Britain and Ireland, and to provide for the Application thereof to the General Service of the United Kingdom.
- Citation: 56 Geo. 3. c. 98

Dates
- Royal assent: 1 July 1816

Status: Partially repealed

Text of statute as originally enacted

Text of the Consolidated Fund Act 1816 as in force today (including any amendments) within the United Kingdom, from legislation.gov.uk.

- The Consolidated Fund Act 1816 (56 Geo. 3. c. 98)

Consolidated Fund, etc. Act 1817
- Act of Parliament
- Parliament of the United Kingdom
- Citation: 57 Geo. 3. c. 48

Dates
- Royal assent: 27 June 1817

- The Consolidated Fund, etc. Act 1817 (57 Geo. 3. c. 48)

==== 1820s ====
- The Consolidated Fund Act 1820 (1 Geo. 4. c. 44)
- The Supply Act 1821 (1 & 2 Geo. 4. c. 4)
- The Supply Act 1822 (3 Geo. 4. c. 7)
- The Supply Act 1823 (4 Geo. 4. c. 6)
- The Supply Act 1824 (5 Geo. 4. c. 3)
- The Supply Act 1825 (6 Geo. 4. c. 1)
- The Supply (No. 2) Act 1825 (6 Geo. 4. c. 14)
- The Supply Act 1826 (7 Geo. 4. c. 1)
- The Supply Act 1827 (7 & 8 Geo. 4. c. 16)
- The Supply (No. 2) Act 1827 (7 & 8 Geo. 4. c. 42)
- The Supply Act 1828 (9 Geo. 4. c. 1)
- The Supply Act 1829 (10 Geo. 4. c. 3)

==== 1850s ====
===== 1859 =====
Consolidated Fund (£1,222,383 8s. 9d.) Act
- Act of Parliament
- Parliament of the United Kingdom
- Long title: An Act to apply the Sum of One million two hundred twenty-two thousand three hundred and eighty-three Pounds Eight Shillings and Ninepence out of the Consolidated Fund to the Service of the Year ending the Thirty-first Day of March One thousand eight hundred and fifty-nine.
- Citation: 22 Vict. c. 6

Dates
- Royal assent: 25 March 1859

Other legislation
- Repealed by: Statute Law Revision Act 1875

Status: Repealed

- The Consolidated Fund (£1,222,383 8s. 9d.) Act (22 Vict. c. 6). The bill for this act was the Consolidated Fund (£1,222,383 8s. 9d.) Bill. This act received royal assent on 25 March 1859.

Consolidated Fund (£11,000,000) Act
- Act of Parliament
- Parliament of the United Kingdom
- Long title: An Act to apply the Sum of Eleven Millions out of the Consolidated Fund to the Service of the Year One thousand eight hundred and fifty-nine.
- Citation: 22 Vict. c. 7

Dates
- Royal assent: 25 March 1859

Other legislation
- Repealed by: Statute Law Revision Act 1875

Status: Repealed

- The Consolidated Fund (£11,000,000) Act (22 Vict. c. 7). The bill for this act was the Consolidated Fund (£11,000,000) Bill. This act received royal assent on 25 March 1859.

Consolidated Fund (£7,000,000) Act
- Act of Parliament
- Parliament of the United Kingdom
- Long title: An Act to apply the Sum of Seven Millions out of the Consolidated Fund to the Service of the Year One thousand eight hundred and fifty-nine.
- Citation: 22 & 23 Vict. c. 2

Dates
- Royal assent: 1 August 1859

Other legislation
- Repealed by: Statute Law Revision Act 1875

Status: Repealed

- The Consolidated Fund (£7,000,000) Act (22 & 23 Vict. c. 2). The bill for this act was the Consolidated Fund (£7,000,000) Bill. This act received royal assent on 1 August 1859.

==== 1860s ====
===== 1860 =====
Consolidated Fund (£407,649) Act 1860
- Act of Parliament
- Parliament of the United Kingdom
- Long title: An Act to apply the Sum of Four hundred and seven thousand six hundred and forty-nine Pounds out of the Consolidated Fund to the Service of the Year ending the Thirty-first Day of March One thousand eight hundred and sixty.
- Citation: 23 & 24 Vict. c. 2

Dates
- Royal assent: 12 March 1860

Other legislation
- Repealed by: Statute Law Revision Act 1875

Status: Repealed

- The Consolidated Fund (£407,649) Act (23 & 24 Vict. c. 2) is sometimes called the Supply Act 1860. The bill for this act was the Consolidated Fund (£407,649) Bill. This act received royal assent on 12 March 1860, and was repealed by the Statute Law Revision Act 1875.

Consolidated Fund (£4,500,000) Act
- Act of Parliament
- Parliament of the United Kingdom
- Long title: An Act to apply the Sum of Four million five hundred thousand Pounds out of the Consolidated Fund to the Service of the Year One thousand eight hundred and sixty.
- Citation: 23 & 24 Vict. c. 3

Dates
- Royal assent: 23 March 1860

Other legislation
- Repealed by: Statute Law Revision Act 1875

Status: Repealed

- The Consolidated Fund (£4,500,000) Act (23 & 24 Vict. c. 3) is sometimes called the Supply Act 1860. The bill for this act was the Consolidated Fund (£4,500,000) Bill. This act received royal assent on 23 March 1860, and was repealed by the Statute Law Revision Act 1875.

Consolidated Fund (£850,000) Act
- Act of Parliament
- Parliament of the United Kingdom
- Long title: An Act to apply the Sum of Eight hundred and fifty thousand Pounds out of the Consolidated Fund to the Service of the Year ending the Thirty-first Day of March One thousand eight hundred and sixty.
- Citation: 23 & 24 Vict. c. 12

Dates
- Royal assent: 31 March 1860

Other legislation
- Repealed by: Statute Law Revision Act 1875

Status: Repealed

- The Consolidated Fund (£850,000) Act (23 & 24 Vict. c. 12). The bill for this act was the Consolidated Fund (£850,000) Bill. This act received royal assent on 31 March 1860, and was repealed by the Statute Law Revision Act 1875.

Consolidated Fund (£9,500,000) Act
- Act of Parliament
- Parliament of the United Kingdom
- Long title: An Act to apply the Sum of Nine million five hundred thousand Pounds out of the Consolidated Fund to the Service of the Year One thousand eight hundred and sixty.
- Citation: 23 & 24 Vict. c. 25

Dates
- Royal assent: 25 May 1860

Other legislation
- Repealed by: Statute Law Revision Act 1875

Status: Repealed

- The Consolidated Fund (£9,500,000) Act (23 & 24 Vict. c. 25). The bill for this act was the Consolidated Fund (£9,500,000) Bill. This act received royal assent on 25 May 1860, and was repealed by the Statute Law Revision Act 1875.

Consolidated Fund (£10,000,000) Act 1860
- Act of Parliament
- Parliament of the United Kingdom
- Long title: An Act to apply the Sum of Ten Millions out of the Consolidated Fund to the Service of the Year One thousand eight hundred and sixty.
- Citation: 23 & 24 Vict. c. 103

Dates
- Royal assent: 20 August 1860

Other legislation
- Repealed by: Statute Law Revision Act 1875

Status: Repealed

- The Consolidated Fund (£10,000,000) Act (23 & 24 Vict. c. 103) is sometimes called the Supply Act 1860. The bill for this act was the Consolidated Fund (£10,000,000) Bill. This act received royal assent on 20 August 1860, and was repealed by the Statute Law Revision Act 1875.

===== 1861 =====
Consolidated Fund (4,000,000) Act
- Act of Parliament
- Parliament of the United Kingdom
- Citation: 24 & 25 Vict. c. 2

Dates
- Royal assent: 22 March 1861

Other legislation
- Repealed by: Statute Law Revision Act 1875

Status: Repealed

- The Consolidated Fund (4,000,000) Act (24 & 25 Vict. c. 2) is sometimes called the Supply Act 1861. The bill for this act was the Consolidated Fund (£4,000,000) Bill. This act received royal assent on 22 March 1861, and was repealed by the Statute Law Revision Act 1875.

Consolidated Fund (3,000,000) Act
- Act of Parliament
- Parliament of the United Kingdom
- Citation: 24 & 25 Vict. c. 6

Dates
- Royal assent: 18 April 1861

Other legislation
- Repealed by: Statute Law Revision Act 1875

Status: Repealed

- The Consolidated Fund (3,000,000) Act (24 & 25 Vict. c. 6) is sometimes called the Supply Act 1861. The bill for this act was the Consolidated Fund (£3,000,000) Bill. This act received royal assent on 18 April 1861, and was repealed by the Statute Law Revision Act 1875.

Consolidated Fund (10,000,000) Act
- Act of Parliament
- Parliament of the United Kingdom
- Citation: 24 & 25 Vict. c. 19

Dates
- Royal assent: 7 June 1861

Other legislation
- Repealed by: Statute Law Revision Act 1875

Status: Repealed

- The Consolidated Fund (10,000,000) Act (24 & 25 Vict. c. 19) is sometimes called the Supply Act 1861. The bill for this act was the Consolidated Fund (£10,000,000) Bill. This act received royal assent on 7 June 1861, and was repealed by the Statute Law Revision Act 1875.

===== 1862 =====
Consolidated Fund (£973,747) Act
- Act of Parliament
- Parliament of the United Kingdom
- Long title: An Act to apply the Sum of Nine hundred and seventy-three thousand seven hundred and forty-seven Pounds out of the Consolidated Fund to the Service of the Year ending the Thirty-first Day of March One thousand eight hundred and sixty-two.
- Citation: 25 & 26 Vict. c. 1

Dates
- Royal assent: 10 March 1862

Other legislation
- Repealed by: Statute Law Revision Act 1875

Status: Repealed

- The Consolidated Fund (£973,747) Act (25 & 26 Vict. c. 1) is sometimes called the Supply Act 1862. The bill for this act was the Consolidated Fund (£973,747) Bill. This act received royal assent on 10 March 1862, and was repealed by the Statute Law Revision Act 1875.

Consolidated Fund (£18,000,000) Act
- Act of Parliament
- Parliament of the United Kingdom
- Long title: An Act to apply the Sum of Eighteen Millions out of the Consolidated Fund to the Service of the Year One thousand eight hundred and sixty-two.
- Citation: 25 & 26 Vict. c. 2

Dates
- Royal assent: 24 March 1862

Other legislation
- Repealed by: Statute Law Revision Act 1875

Status: Repealed

- The Consolidated Fund (£18,000,000) Act (25 & 26 Vict. c. 2). The bill for this act was the Consolidated Fund (£18,000,000) Bill. This act received royal assent on 24 March 1862, and was repealed by the Statute Law Revision Act 1875.

Consolidated Fund (£10,000,000) Act
- Act of Parliament
- Parliament of the United Kingdom
- Citation: 25 & 26 Vict. c. 31

Dates
- Royal assent: 7 July 1862

Other legislation
- Repealed by: Statute Law Revision Act 1875

Status: Repealed

- The Consolidated Fund (£10,000,000) Act (25 & 26 Vict. c. 31) is sometimes called the Supply Act 1862. The bill for this act was the Consolidated Fund (£10,000,000) Bill. This act received royal assent on 7 July 1862, and was repealed by the Statute Law Revision Act 1875.

===== 1863 =====
Consolidated Fund (£10,000,000) Act
- Act of Parliament
- Parliament of the United Kingdom
- Citation: 26 & 27 Vict. c. 6

Dates
- Royal assent: 27 March 1863

Other legislation
- Repealed by: Statute Law Revision Act 1875

Status: Repealed

- The Consolidated Fund (£10,000,000) Act (26 & 27 Vict. c. 6) is sometimes called the Supply Act 1863. The Bill for this Act was the Consolidated Fund (£10,000,000) Bill. This Act received royal assent on 27 March 1863, and was repealed by the Statute Law Revision Act 1875.

Consolidated Fund (£20,000,000) Act
- Act of Parliament
- Parliament of the United Kingdom
- Citation: 26 & 27 Vict. c. 15

Dates
- Royal assent: 11 May 1863

Other legislation
- Repealed by: Statute Law Revision Act 1875

Status: Repealed

- The Consolidated Fund (£20,000,000) Act (26 & 27 Vict. c. 15) is sometimes called the Supply Act 1863. The Bill for this Act was the Consolidated Fund (£20,000,000) Bill. This Act received royal assent on 11 May 1863, and was repealed by the Statute Law Revision Act 1875.

===== 1864 =====
Consolidated Fund (£584,650) Act
- Act of Parliament
- Parliament of the United Kingdom
- Citation: 27 & 28 Vict. c. 5

Dates
- Royal assent: 18 March 1864

Other legislation
- Repealed by: Statute Law Revision Act 1875

Status: Repealed

- The Consolidated Fund (£584,650) Act (27 & 28 Vict. c. 5) is sometimes called the Supply Act 1864. The bill for this act was the Consolidated Fund (£584,650) Bill. This act received royal assent on 18 March 1864, and was repealed by the Statute Law Revision Act 1875.

Consolidated Fund (£4,500,000) Act
- Act of Parliament
- Parliament of the United Kingdom
- Citation: 27 & 28 Vict. c. 6

Dates
- Royal assent: 18 March 1864

Other legislation
- Repealed by: Statute Law Revision Act 1875

Status: Repealed

- The Consolidated Fund (£4,500,000) Act (27 & 28 Vict. c. 6) is sometimes called the Supply Act 1864. The bill for this act was the Consolidated Fund (4,500,000) Bill. This act received royal assent on 18 March 1864, and was repealed by the Statute Law Revision Act 1875.

Consolidated Fund (£15,000,000) Act
- Act of Parliament
- Parliament of the United Kingdom
- Citation: 27 & 28 Vict. c. 11

Dates
- Royal assent: 28 April 1864

Other legislation
- Repealed by: Statute Law Revision Act 1875

Status: Repealed

- The Consolidated Fund (£15,000,000) Act (27 & 28 Vict. c. 11) is sometimes called the Supply Act 1864. The bill for this act was the Consolidated Fund (£15,000,000) Bill. This act received royal assent on 28 April 1864, and was repealed by the Statute Law Revision Act 1875.

===== 1865 =====
Consolidated Fund (£175,650) Act
- Act of Parliament
- Parliament of the United Kingdom
- Long title: An Act to apply the Sum of One hundred and seventy-five thousand six hundred and fifty Pounds out of the Consolidated Fund to the Service of the Year ending the Thirty-first Day of March One thousand eight hundred and sixty-five.
- Citation: 28 & 29 Vict. c. 4

Dates
- Royal assent: 27 March 1865

Other legislation
- Repealed by: Statute Law Revision Act 1875

Status: Repealed

- The Consolidated Fund (£175,650) Act (28 & 29 Vict. c. 4) is sometimes called the Supply Act 1865. The bill for this act was the Consolidated Fund (£175,650) Bill. This act received royal assent on 27 March 1865, and was repealed by the Statute Law Revision Act 1875.

Consolidated Fund (£15,000,000) Act
- Act of Parliament
- Parliament of the United Kingdom
- Citation: 28 & 29 Vict. c. 10

Dates
- Royal assent: 7 April 1865

Other legislation
- Repealed by: Statute Law Revision Act 1875

Status: Repealed

- The Consolidated Fund (£15,000,000) Act (28 & 29 Vict. c. 10) is sometimes called the Supply Act 1865. The bill for this act was the Consolidated Fund (£15,000,000) Bill. This act received royal assent on 7 April 1865, and was repealed by the Statute Law Revision Act 1875.

===== 1866 =====
Supply Act 1866
- Act of Parliament
- Parliament of the United Kingdom
- Citation: 29 & 30 Vict. c. 6

Dates
- Royal assent: 13 March 1866

Other legislation
- Repealed by: Statute Law Revision Act 1875

Status: Repealed

- The act 29 & 30 Vict. c. 6. The bill for this act was the Consolidated Fund (£1,137,772) Bill. This act received royal assent on 13 March 1866, and was repealed by the Statute Law Revision Act 1875.

Consolidated Fund Act (19,000,000l.)
- Act of Parliament
- Parliament of the United Kingdom
- Citation: 29 & 30 Vict. c. 13

Dates
- Royal assent: 23 March 1866

Other legislation
- Repealed by: Statute Law Revision Act 1875

Status: Repealed

- The Consolidated Fund Act (19,000,000l.) (29 & 30 Vict. c. 13). The bill for this act was the Consolidated Fund (£19,000,000) Bill. This act received royal assent on 23 March 1866, and was repealed by the Statute Law Revision Act 1875.

===== 1867 =====
Consolidated Fund (£369,118 5s. 6d.) Act
- Act of Parliament
- Parliament of the United Kingdom
- Citation: 30 & 31 Vict. c. 4

Dates
- Royal assent: 29 March 1867

Other legislation
- Repealed by: Statute Law Revision Act 1875

Status: Repealed

- The Consolidated Fund (£369,118 5s. 6d.) Act (30 & 31 Vict. c. 4) is sometimes called the Supply Act 1867. The bill for this act was the Consolidated Fund (£369,118 5s. 6d.) Bill. This act received royal assent on 29 March 1867, and was repealed by the Statute Law Revision Act 1875.

Consolidated Fund (£7,924,000) Act
- Act of Parliament
- Parliament of the United Kingdom
- Citation: 30 & 31 Vict. c. 7

Dates
- Royal assent: 5 April 1867

Other legislation
- Repealed by: Statute Law Revision Act 1875

Status: Repealed

- The Consolidated Fund (£7,924,000) Act (30 & 31 Vict. c. 7) is sometimes called the Supply Act 1867. The bill for this act was the Consolidated Fund (£7,924,000) Bill. This act received royal assent on 5 April 1867, and was repealed by the Statute Law Revision Act 1875.

Consolidated Fund (£14,000,000) Act
- Act of Parliament
- Parliament of the United Kingdom
- Citation: 30 & 31 Vict. c. 30

Dates
- Royal assent: 17 June 1867

Other legislation
- Repealed by: Statute Law Revision Act 1875

Status: Repealed

- The Consolidated Fund (£14,000,000) Act (30 & 31 Vict. c. 30). The bill for this act was the Consolidated Fund (£14,000,000) Bill. This act received royal assent on 17 June 1867, and was repealed by the Statute Law Revision Act 1875.

Consolidated Fund (£2,000,000) Act
- Act of Parliament
- Parliament of the United Kingdom
- Long title: An Act to apply the Sum of Two million Pounds out of the Consolidate Fund to the Service of the Year ending the Thirty-first Day of March One thousand eight hundred and sixty-eight.
- Citation: 31 & 32 Vict. c. 1

Dates
- Royal assent: 7 December 1867

Other legislation
- Repealed by: Statute Law Revision Act 1875

Status: Repealed

- The Consolidated Fund (£2,000,000) Act (31 & 32 Vict. c. 1) is sometimes called the Supply Act 1867. The bill for this act was the Consolidated Fund (£2,000,000) Bill. This act received royal assent on 7 December 1867, and was repealed by the Statute Law Revision Act 1875.

===== 1868 =====
Consolidated Fund (£362,398 19s. 9d.) Act
- Act of Parliament
- Parliament of the United Kingdom
- Long title: An Act to apply the Sum of Three hundred and sixty-two thousand three hundred und ninety-eight Pounds Nineteen Shillings and Ninepence out of the Consolidated Fund to the Service of the Years ending the Thirty-first Day of March One thousand eight hundred and sixty-seven and the Thirty-first Day of March One thousand eight hundred and sixty-eight.
- Citation: 31 & 32 Vict. c. 10

Dates
- Royal assent: 30 March 1868

Other legislation
- Repealed by: Statute Law Revision Act 1875

Status: Repealed

- The Consolidated Fund (£362,398 19s. 9d.) Act (31 & 32 Vict. c. 10) is sometimes called the Supply Act 1868. The bill for this act was the Consolidated Fund (£362,398 19s. 9d.) Bill. This act received royal assent on 30 March 1868, and was repealed by the Statute Law Revision Act 1875.

Consolidated Fund (£6,000,000) Act
- Act of Parliament
- Parliament of the United Kingdom
- Long title: An Act to apply the sum of Six million Pounds out of the Consolidated Fund to the Service of the Year ending on the Thirty-first Day of March One thousand eight hundred and sixty-nine.
- Citation: 31 & 32 Vict. c. 13

Dates
- Royal assent: 3 April 1868

Other legislation
- Repealed by: Statute Law Revision Act 1875

Status: Repealed

- The Consolidated Fund (£6,000,000) Act (31 & 32 Vict. c. 13) is sometimes called the Supply Act 1868. The bill for this act was the Consolidated Fund (£6,000,000) Bill. This act received royal assent on 3 April 1868, and was repealed by the Statute Law Revision Act 1875.

Consolidated Fund (£17,000,000) Act
- Act of Parliament
- Parliament of the United Kingdom
- Citation: 31 & 32 Vict. c. 16

Dates
- Royal assent: 29 May 1868

Other legislation
- Repealed by: Statute Law Revision Act 1875

Status: Repealed

- The Consolidated Fund (£17,000,000) Act (31 & 32 Vict. c. 16). The bill for this act was the Consolidated Fund (£17,000,000) Bill. This act received royal assent on 29 May 1868, and was repealed by the Statute Law Revision Act 1875.

===== 1869 =====
Consolidated Fund (8,406,272l. 13s. 4d.) Act
- Act of Parliament
- Parliament of the United Kingdom
- Citation: 32 & 33 Vict. c. 1

Dates
- Royal assent: 19 March 1869

Other legislation
- Repealed by: Statute Law Revision Act 1883

Status: Repealed

- The Consolidated Fund (8,406,272l. 13s. 4d.) Act (32 & 33 Vict. c. 1) is sometimes called the Supply Act 1869. The bill for this act was the Consolidated Fund (£8,406,272 13s. 4d.) Bill. This act received royal assent on 19 March 1869, and was repealed by the Statute Law Revision Act 1883.

Consolidated Fund (£17,100,000) Act
- Act of Parliament
- Parliament of the United Kingdom
- Citation: 32 & 33 Vict. c. 8

Dates
- Royal assent: 13 May 1869

Other legislation
- Repealed by: Statute Law Revision Act 1883

Status: Repealed

- The Consolidated Fund (£17,100,000) Act (32 & 33 Vict. c. 8). The bill for this act was the Consolidated Fund (£17,100,000) Bill. This act received royal assent on 13 May 1869, and was repealed by the Statute Law Revision Act 1883.

==== 1870s ====
===== 1870 =====
Consolidated Fund (£9,564,191 7s. 2d.) Act
- Act of Parliament
- Parliament of the United Kingdom
- Long title: An Act to apply certain sums out of the Consolidated Fund to the service of the years ending on the thirty-first day of March one thousand eight hundred and sixty-nine, one thousand eight hundred and seventy, and one thousand eight hundred and seventy-one, and preceding years.
- Citation: 33 & 34 Vict. c. 5

Dates
- Royal assent: 25 March 1870

Other legislation
- Repealed by: Statute Law Revision Act 1883

Status: Repealed

- The Consolidated Fund (£9,564,191 7s. 2d.) Act (33 & 34 Vict. c. 5) is sometimes called the Supply Act 1870. The bill for this act was the Consolidated Fund (£9,564,191 7s. 2d.) Bill. This act received royal assent on 25 March 1870, and was repealed by the Statute Law Revision Act 1883.

Consolidated Fund (£9,000,000) Act
- Act of Parliament
- Parliament of the United Kingdom
- Long title: An Act to apply the sum of nine million pounds out of the Consolidated Fund to the service of the year ending the thirty-first day of March one thousand eight hundred and seventy-one.
- Citation: 33 & 34 Vict. c. 31

Dates
- Royal assent: 1 August 1870

Other legislation
- Repealed by: Statute Law Revision Act 1883

Status: Repealed

- The Consolidated Fund (£9,000,000) Act (33 & 34 Vict. c. 31). The bill for this act was the Consolidated Fund (£9,000,000) Bill. This act received royal assent on 1 August 1870, and was repealed by the Statute Law Revision Act 1883.

===== 1871 =====
Consolidated Fund (£462,580 9s. 11d.) Act 1871
- Act of Parliament
- Parliament of the United Kingdom
- Long title: An Act to apply the sum of four hundred and sixty-two thousand five hundred and eighty pounds nine shillings and elevenpence out of the Consolidated Fund to the service of the years ending the thirty-first day of March one thousand eight hundred and seventy and one thousand eight hundred and seventy-one.
- Citation: 34 & 35 Vict. c. 6

Dates
- Royal assent: 30 March 1871

Other legislation
- Repealed by: Statute Law Revision Act 1883

Status: Repealed

- The Consolidated Fund (£462,580 9s. 11d.) Act (34 & 35 Vict. c. 6) is sometimes called the Supply Act 1871. The bill for this act was the Consolidated Fund (£462,580 9s. 11d.) Bill. This act received royal assent on 30 March 1871, and was repealed by the Statute Law Revision Act 1883.

Consolidated Fund (£5,411,900) Act 1871
- Act of Parliament
- Parliament of the United Kingdom
- Long title: An Act to apply the sum of five million four hundred and eleven thousand nine hundred pounds out of the Consolidated Fund to the service of the year ending the thirty-first day of March one thousand eight hundred and seventy-two.
- Citation: 34 & 35 Vict. c. 7

Dates
- Royal assent: 31 March 1871

Other legislation
- Repealed by: Statute Law Revision Act 1883

Status: Repealed

- The Consolidated Fund (£5,411,900) Act (34 & 35 Vict. c. 7) is sometimes called the Supply Act 1871. The bill for this act was the Consolidated Fund (£5,411,900) Bill. This act received royal assent on 31 March 1871, and was repealed by the Statute Law Revision Act 1883.

Consolidated Fund (£7,000,000) Act 1871
- Act of Parliament
- Parliament of the United Kingdom
- Long title: An Act to apply the sum of seven million pounds out of the Consolidated Fund to the service of the year ending the thirty-first day of March one thousand eight hundred and seventy-two.
- Citation: 34 & 35 Vict. c. 20

Dates
- Royal assent: 25 May 1871

Other legislation
- Repealed by: Statute Law Revision Act 1883

Status: Repealed

- The Consolidated Fund (£7,000,000) Act (34 & 35 Vict. c. 20) is sometimes called the Supply Act 1871. The bill for this act was the Consolidated Fund (£7,000,000) Bill. This act received royal assent on 25 May 1871, and was repealed by the Statute Law Revision Act 1883.

Consolidated Fund (£10,000,000) Act 1871
- Act of Parliament
- Parliament of the United Kingdom
- Long title: An Act to apply the sum of Ten million pounds out of the Consolidated Fund to the service of the year ending the thirty-first day of March one thousand eight hundred and seventy-two.
- Citation: 34 & 35 Vict. c. 51

Dates
- Royal assent: 24 July 1871

Other legislation
- Repealed by: Statute Law Revision Act 1883

Status: Repealed

- The Consolidated Fund (£10,000,000) Act (34 & 35 Vict. c. 51) is sometimes called the Supply Act 1871. The bill for this act was the Consolidated Fund (£10,000,000) Bill. This act received royal assent on 24 July 1871, and was repealed by the Statute Law Revision Act 1883.

===== 1872 =====
Supply Act 1872
- Act of Parliament
- Parliament of the United Kingdom
- Long title: An Act to apply certain sums out of the Consolidated Fund to the service of the years ending the thirty-first day of March one thousand eight hundred and seventy-one, one thousand eight hundred and seventy-two, and one thousand eight hundred and seventy-three.
- Citation: 35 & 36 Vict. c. 1

Dates
- Royal assent: 25 March 1872

Other legislation
- Repealed by: Statute Law Revision Act 1883

Status: Repealed

- The act 35 & 36 Vict. c. 1. The bill for this act was the Consolidated Fund (£5,411,099 3s. 3d.) Bill. This act received royal assent on 25 March 1872, and was repealed by the Statute Law Revision Act 1883.

Supply (No. 2) Act 1872
- Act of Parliament
- Parliament of the United Kingdom
- Long title: An Act to apply the sum of Six million pounds out of the Consolidated Fuud to the service of the year ending the thirty-first day of March one thousand eight hundred and seventy-three.
- Citation: 35 & 36 Vict. c. 11

Dates
- Royal assent: 13 May 1872

Other legislation
- Repealed by: Statute Law Revision Act 1883

Status: Repealed

- The act 35 & 36 Vict. c. 11. The bill for this act was the Consolidated Fund (£6,000,000) Bill. This act received royal assent on 13 May 1872, and was repealed by the Statute Law Revision Act 1883.

Supply (No. 3) Act 1872
- Act of Parliament
- Parliament of the United Kingdom
- Long title: An Act to apply the sum of eight million pounds out of the Consolidated Fund to the service of the year ending the thirty-first day of March one thousand eight hundred and seventy-three.
- Citation: 35 & 36 Vict. c. 37

Dates
- Royal assent: 25 July 1872

- The act 35 & 36 Vict. c. 37. The bill for this act was the Consolidated Fund (£8,000,000) Bill. This act received royal assent on 25 July 1872, and was repealed by the Statute Law Revision Act 1883.

===== 1873 =====
Supply Act 1873
- Act of Parliament
- Parliament of the United Kingdom
- Long title: An Act to apply certain sums out of the Consolidated Fund to the service of the years ending the thirty-first day of March one thousand eight hundred and seventy-two, one thousand eight hundred and seventy-three, and one thousand eight hundred and seventy-four.
- Citation: 36 & 37 Vict. c. 3

Dates
- Royal assent: 29 March 1873

Other legislation
- Repealed by: Statute Law Revision Act 1883

Status: Repealed

- The act 36 & 37 Vict. c. 3. The bill for this act was the Consolidated Fund (£9,317,346 19s. 9d.) Bill. This act received royal assent on 29 March 1873, and was repealed by the Statute Law Revision Act 1883.

Supply (No. 2) Act 1873
- Act of Parliament
- Parliament of the United Kingdom
- Long title: An Act to apply the sum of Twelve million Pounds out of the Consolidated Fund to the service of the year ending the thirty-first day of March one thousand eight hundred and seventy-four.
- Citation: 36 & 37 Vict. c. 26

Dates
- Royal assent: 10 June 1873

Other legislation
- Repealed by: Statute Law Revision Act 1883

Status: Repealed

- The act 36 & 37 Vict. c. 26. The bill for this act was the Consolidated Fund (£12,000,000) Bill. This act received royal assent on 10 June 1873, and was repealed by the Statute Law Revision Act 1883.

===== 1874 =====
Consolidated Fund (£1,422,797 14s. 6d.) Act
- Act of Parliament
- Parliament of the United Kingdom
- Long title: An Act to apply the sum of one million four hundred and twenty-two thousand seven hundred and ninety-seven pounds fourteen shillings and sixpence out of the Consolidated Fund to the service of the years ending the thirty-first day of March one thousand eight hundred and seventy-three and one thousand eight hundred and seventy-four.
- Citation: 37 & 38 Vict. c. 1

Dates
- Royal assent: 28 March 1874

Other legislation
- Repealed by: Statute Law Revision Act 1883

Status: Repealed

- The Consolidated Fund (£1,422,797 14s. 6d.) Act (37 & 38 Vict. c. 1) is sometimes called the Supply Act 1874. The bill for this act was the Consolidated Fund (£1,422,797 14s. 6d.) Bill. This act received royal assent on 28 March 1874, and was repealed by the Statute Law Revision Act 1883.

Consolidated Fund (£7,000,000) Act
- Act of Parliament
- Parliament of the United Kingdom
- Long title: An Act to apply the sum of seven million pounds out of the Consolidated Fund to the service of the year ending the thirty-first day of March one thousand eight hundred and seventy-five.
- Citation: 37 & 38 Vict. c. 2

Dates
- Royal assent: 30 March 1874

Other legislation
- Repealed by: Statute Law Revision Act 1883

Status: Repealed

- The Consolidated Fund (£7,000,000) Act (37 & 38 Vict. c. 2) is sometimes called the Supply Act 1874. The bill for this act was the Consolidated Fund (£7,000,000) Bill. This act received royal assent on 30 March 1874, and was repealed by the Statute Law Revision Act 1883.

Consolidated Fund (£13,000,000) Act
- Act of Parliament
- Parliament of the United Kingdom
- Long title: An Act to apply the sum of thirteen million pounds out of the Consolidated Fund to the service of the year ending the thirty-first day of March one thousand eight hundred and seventy-five.
- Citation: 37 & 38 Vict. c. 10

Dates
- Royal assent: 21 May 1874

Other legislation
- Repealed by: Statute Law Revision Act 1883

Status: Repealed

- The Consolidated Fund (£13,000,000) Act (37 & 38 Vict. c. 10). The bill for this act was the Consolidated Fund (£13,000,000) Bill. This act received royal assent on 21 May 1874, and was repealed by the Statute Law Revision Act 1883.

===== 1875 =====
Supply Act 1875
- Act of Parliament
- Parliament of the United Kingdom
- Long title: An Act to apply the sum of eight hundred and two thousand six hundred and sixty-one pounds eight shillings and eleven pence out of the Consolidated Fund to the service of the years ending the thirty-first day of March one thousand eight hundred and seventy-four and one thousand eight hundred and seventy-five.
- Citation: 38 & 39 Vict. c. 1

Dates
- Royal assent: 19 March 1875

Other legislation
- Repealed by: Statute Law Revision Act 1883

Status: Repealed

- The Consolidated Fund Act (38 & 39 Vict. c. 1). The bill for this act was the Consolidated Fund {£880,522 1s. 4d. £2,139 7s. 7d.} Bill. This act received royal assent on 19 March 1875, and was repealed by the Statute Law Revision Act 1883.

Supply (No. 2) Act 1875
- Act of Parliament
- Parliament of the United Kingdom
- Long title: An Act to apply the sum of seven million pounds out of the Consolidated Fund to the service of the year ending the thirty-first day of March one thousand eight hundred and seventy-six.
- Citation: 38 & 39 Vict. c. 2

Dates
- Royal assent: 19 March 1875

Other legislation
- Repealed by: Statute Law Revision Act 1883

Status: Repealed

- The Consolidated Fund Act (38 & 39 Vict. c. 2). The bill for this act was the Consolidated Fund (£7,000,000) Bill. This act received royal assent on 19 March 1875, and was repealed by the Statute Law Revision Act 1883.

Supply (No. 3) Act 1875
- Act of Parliament
- Parliament of the United Kingdom
- Long title: An Act to apply the sum of Fifteen millions out of the Consolidated Fund to the service of the year ending the thirty-first day of March one thousand eight hundred and seventy-six.
- Citation: 38 & 39 Vict. c. 10

Dates
- Royal assent: 13 May 1875

Other legislation
- Repealed by: Statute Law Revision Act 1883

Status: Repealed

- The Consolidated Fund Act (38 & 39 Vict. c. 10). The bill for this act was the Consolidated Fund (£15,000,000) Bill. This act received royal assent on 13 May 1875, and was repealed by the Statute Law Revision Act 1883.

===== 1876 =====
Consolidated Fund Act (4,080,000l.)
- Act of Parliament
- Parliament of the United Kingdom
- Citation: 39 & 40 Vict. c. 2

Dates
- Royal assent: 9 March 1876

Other legislation
- Repealed by: Statute Law Revision Act 1883

Status: Repealed

- The Consolidated Fund Act (4,080,000l.) (39 & 40 Vict. c. 2). The bill for this act was the Consolidated Fund (£4,080,000) Bill. This act received royal assent on 9 March 1876, and was repealed by the Statute Law Revision Act 1883.

Consolidated Fund Act (10,029,550l. 5s. 1d.)
- Act of Parliament
- Parliament of the United Kingdom
- Citation: 39 & 40 Vict. c. 4

Dates
- Royal assent: 27 March 1876

Other legislation
- Repealed by: Statute Law Revision Act 1883

Status: Repealed

- The Consolidated Fund Act (10,029,550l. 5s. 1d.) (39 & 40 Vict. c. 4) is sometimes called the Supply Act 1876. The bill for this act was the Consolidated Fund (£10,029,550 5s. 1d.) Bill. This act received royal assent on 27 March 1876, and was repealed by the Statute Law Revision Act 1883.

Consolidated Fund Act (11,000,000l.)
- Act of Parliament
- Parliament of the United Kingdom
- Citation: 39 & 40 Vict. c. 15

Dates
- Royal assent: 1 June 1876

Other legislation
- Repealed by: Statute Law Revision Act 1883

Status: Repealed

- The Consolidated Fund Act (11,000,000l.) (39 & 40 Vict. c. 15) is sometimes called the Supply Act 1876. The bill for this act was the Consolidated Fund (£11,000,000) Bill. This act received royal assent on 1 June 1876, and was repealed by the Statute Law Revision Act 1883.

===== 1877 =====
Consolidated Fund Act (350,000l.)
- Act of Parliament
- Parliament of the United Kingdom
- Citation: 40 & 41 Vict. c. 1

Dates
- Royal assent: 12 March 1877

Other legislation
- Repealed by: Statute Law Revision Act 1883

Status: Repealed

- The Consolidated Fund Act (350,000l.) (40 & 41 Vict. c. 1). The bill for this act was the Consolidated Fund (£350,000) Bill. This act received royal assent on 12 March 1877, and was repealed by the Statute Law Revision Act 1883.

Supply Act 1877
- Act of Parliament
- Parliament of the United Kingdom
- Citation: 40 & 41 Vict. c. 6

Dates
- Royal assent: 27 March 1877

Other legislation
- Repealed by: Statute Law Revision Act 1883

Status: Repealed

- The act 40 & 41 Vict. c. 6. The bill for this act was the Consolidated Fund (£9,641,960 6s. 9d.) Bill. This act received royal assent on 27 March 1877, and was repealed by the Statute Law Revision Act 1883.

Consolidated Fund (5,900,000l.) Act
- Act of Parliament
- Parliament of the United Kingdom
- Citation: 40 & 41 Vict. c. 12

Dates
- Royal assent: 11 June 1877

Other legislation
- Repealed by: Statute Law Revision Act 1883

Status: Repealed

- The Consolidated Fund (5,900,000l.) Act (40 & 41 Vict. c. 12). The bill for this act was the Consolidated Fund (£5,900,000) Bill. This act received royal assent on 11 June 1877, and was repealed by the Statute Law Revision Act 1883.

Consolidated Fund (20,000,000l.) Act
- Act of Parliament
- Parliament of the United Kingdom
- Citation: 40 & 41 Vict. c. 24

Dates
- Royal assent: 23 July 1877

Other legislation
- Repealed by: Statute Law Revision Act 1883

Status: Repealed

- The Consolidated Fund (20,000,000l.) Act (40 & 41 Vict. c. 24) is sometimes called the Supply Act 1877. The bill for this act was the Consolidated Fund (£20,000,000) Bill. This act received royal assent on 23 July 1877, and was repealed by the Statute Law Revision Act 1883.

===== 1878 =====
Consolidated Fund Act (6,000,000l.)
- Act of Parliament
- Parliament of the United Kingdom
- Long title: An Act to apply the sum of Six million pounds out of the Consolidated Fund to the service of the year ending the thirty-first day of March one thousand eight hundred and seventy-eight.
- Citation: 41 & 42 Vict. c. 1

Dates
- Royal assent: 25 February 1878

Other legislation
- Repealed by: Statute Law Revision Act 1883

Status: Repealed

Text of statute as originally enacted

- The Consolidated Fund Act (6,000,000l.) (41 & 42 Vict. c. 1). The bill for this act was the Consolidated Fund (£6,000,000) Bill. This act received royal assent on 25 February 1878, and was repealed by the Statute Law Revision Act 1883.

Consolidated Fund (No. 2) Act 1878
- Act of Parliament
- Parliament of the United Kingdom
- Long title: An Act to apply certain Sums out of the Consolidated Fund to the service of the years ending on the thirty-first day of March one thousand eight hundred and seventy-seven, one thousand eight hundred and seventy-eight, and one thousand eight hundred and seventy-nine.
- Citation: 41 & 42 Vict. c. 9

Dates
- Royal assent: 28 March 1878

Other legislation
- Repealed by: Statute Law Revision Act 1883

Status: Repealed

Text of statute as originally enacted

- The Consolidated Fund (No. 2) Act 1878 (41 & 42 Vict. c. 9). This act received royal assent on 28 March 1878, and was repealed by the Statute Law Revision Act 1883.

Consolidated Fund (No. 3) Act 1878
- Act of Parliament
- Parliament of the United Kingdom
- Long title: An Act to apply the sum of Seven million five hundred thousand pounds out of the Consolidated Fund to the service of the year ending on the thirty-first day of March one thousand eight hundred and seventy-nine.
- Citation: 41 & 42 Vict. c. 21

Dates
- Royal assent: 17 June 1878

Other legislation
- Repealed by: Statute Law Revision Act 1883

Status: Repealed

Text of statute as originally enacted

- The Consolidated Fund (No. 3) Act 1878 (41 & 42 Vict. c. 21). This act received royal assent on 17 June 1878, and was repealed by the Statute Law Revision Act 1883.

Consolidated Fund (No. 4) Act 1878
- Act of Parliament
- Parliament of the United Kingdom
- Long title: An Act to apply the sum of fourteen millions five hundred thousand pounds out of the Consolidated Fund to the service of the year ending on the thirty-first day of March one thousand eight hundred and seventy-nine.
- Citation: 41 & 42 Vict. c. 45

Dates
- Royal assent: 8 August 1878

Other legislation
- Repealed by: Statute Law Revision Act 1883

Status: Repealed

Text of statute as originally enacted

- The Consolidated Fund (No. 4) Act 1878 (41 & 42 Vict. c. 45). This act received royal assent on 8 August 1878, and was repealed by the Statute Law Revision Act 1883.

===== 1879 =====
Consolidated Fund (No. 1) Act 1879
- Act of Parliament
- Parliament of the United Kingdom
- Long title: An Act to apply the sum of Four million two hundred and fifty thousand pounds out of the Consolidated Fund to the service of the year ending on the thirty-first day of March one thousand eight hundred and seventy-nine.
- Citation: 42 & 43 Vict. c. 2

Dates
- Royal assent: 14 March 1879

Other legislation
- Repealed by: Statute Law Revision Act 1894

Status: Repealed

Text of statute as originally enacted

- The Consolidated Fund (No. 1) Act 1879 (42 & 43 Vict. c. 2) is sometimes called the Consolidated Fund Act (4,250,000l.). This act received royal assent on 14 March 1879, and was repealed by the first schedule to the Statute Law Revision Act 1894.

Consolidated Fund (No. 2) Act 1879
- Act of Parliament
- Parliament of the United Kingdom
- Long title: An Act to apply certain Sums out of the Consolidated Fund to the service of the years ending on the thirty-first day of March one thousand eight hundred and seventy-eight, one thousand eight hundred and seventy-nine, and one thousand eight hundred and eighty.
- Citation: 42 & 43 Vict. c. 7

Dates
- Royal assent: 28 March 1879

Other legislation
- Repealed by: Statute Law Revision Act 1894

Status: Repealed

Text of statute as originally enacted

- The Consolidated Fund (No. 2) Act 1879 (42 & 43 Vict. c. 7). This act received royal assent on 28 March 1879, and was repealed by the first schedule to the Statute Law Revision Act 1894.

Consolidated Fund (No. 3) Act 1879
- Act of Parliament
- Parliament of the United Kingdom
- Long title: An Act to apply the sum of Six million six hundred and ninety-four thousand eight hundred and sixteen pounds out of the Consolidated Fund to the service of the year ending on the thirty-first day of March one thousand eight hundred and eighty.
- Citation: 42 & 43 Vict. c. 14

Dates
- Royal assent: 27 May 1879

Other legislation
- Repealed by: Statute Law Revision Act 1894

Status: Repealed

Text of statute as originally enacted

- The Consolidated Fund (No. 3) Act 1879 (42 & 43 Vict. c. 14). This act received royal assent on 27 May 1879, and was repealed by the first schedule to the Statute Law Revision Act 1894.

Consolidated Fund (No. 3) Act 1879
- Act of Parliament
- Parliament of the United Kingdom
- Long title: An Act to apply the sum of six million five hundred and sixty-seven thousand and twenty-three pounds out of the Consolidated Fund to the service of the year ending on the thirty-first day of March one thousand eight hundred and eighty.
- Citation: 42 & 43 Vict. c. 20

Dates
- Royal assent: 3 July 1879

Other legislation
- Repealed by: Statute Law Revision Act 1894

Status: Repealed

Text of statute as originally enacted

- The Consolidated Fund (No. 4) Act 1879 (42 & 43 Vict. c. 20). This act received royal assent on 3 July 1879, and was repealed by the first schedule to the Statute Law Revision Act 1894.

==== 1880s ====
===== 1880 =====
Consolidated Fund (No. 1) Act 1880
- Act of Parliament
- Parliament of the United Kingdom
- Long title: An Act to apply certain Sums out of the Consolidated Fund to the service of the years ending on the thirty-first day of March one thousand eight hundred and eighty, and one thousand eight hundred and eighty-one.
- Citation: 43 Vict. c. 5

Dates
- Royal assent: 15 March 1880

Other legislation
- Repealed by: Statute Law Revision Act 1894

Status: Repealed

Text of statute as originally enacted

- The Consolidated Fund (No. 1) Act 1880 (43 Vict. c. 5). This act received royal assent on 15 March 1880, and was repealed by the first schedule to the Statute Law Revision Act 1894.

Consolidated Fund (No. 1) Act 1880 (Session 2)
- Act of Parliament
- Parliament of the United Kingdom
- Long title: An Act to apply the sum of Four million nine hundred and twenty-five thousand three hundred and twenty pounds out of the Consolidated Fund to the service of the year ending on the thirty-first day of March one thousand eight hundred and eighty-one.
- Citation: 43 & 44 Vict. c. 3

Dates
- Royal assent: 29 June 1880

Other legislation
- Repealed by: Statute Law Revision Act 1894

Status: Repealed

Text of statute as originally enacted

- The Consolidated Fund (No. 1) Act 1880 (Session 2) (43 & 44 Vict. c. 3). This act received royal assent on 29 June 1880, and was repealed by the first schedule to the Statute Law Revision Act 1894.

Consolidated Fund (No. 2) Act 1880 (Session 2)
- Act of Parliament
- Parliament of the United Kingdom
- Long title: An Act to apply the sum of Ten million eight hundred and eighteen thousand two hundred and seventy-four pounds out of the Consolidated Fund to the service of the year ending on the thirty-first day of March one thousand eight hundred and eighty-one.
- Citation: 43 & 44 Vict. c. 30

Dates
- Royal assent: 26 August 1880

Other legislation
- Repealed by: Statute Law Revision Act 1894

Status: Repealed

Text of statute as originally enacted

- The Consolidated Fund (No. 2) Act 1880 (Session 2) (43 & 44 Vict. c. 30). This act received royal assent on 26 August 1880, and was repealed by the first schedule to the Statute Law Revision Act 1894.

===== 1881 =====
Consolidated Fund (No. 1) Act 1881
- Act of Parliament
- Parliament of the United Kingdom
- Long title: An Act to apply the sum of Two million five hundred thousand pounds out of the Consolidated Fund to the service of the year ending on the thirty-first day of March one thousand eight hundred and eighty-one.
- Citation: 44 & 45 Vict. c. 1

Dates
- Royal assent: 17 February 1881

Other legislation
- Repealed by: Statute Law Revision Act 1894

Status: Repealed

Text of statute as originally enacted

- The Consolidated Fund (No. 1) Act 1881 (44 & 45 Vict. c. 1). This act received royal assent on 17 February 1881, and was repealed by the first schedule to the Statute Law Revision Act 1894.

Consolidated Fund (No. 2) Act 1881
- Act of Parliament
- Parliament of the United Kingdom
- Long title: An Act to apply certain Sums out of the Consolidated Fund to the service of the years ending on the thirty-first day of March one thousand eight hundred and eighty, one thousand eight hundred and eighty-one, and one thousand eight hundred and eighty-two.
- Citation: 44 & 45 Vict. c. 8

Dates
- Royal assent: 29 March 1881

Other legislation
- Repealed by: Statute Law Revision Act 1894

Status: Repealed

Text of statute as originally enacted

- The Consolidated Fund (No. 2) Act 1881 (44 & 45 Vict. c. 8). This act received royal assent on 29 March 1881, and was repealed by the first schedule to the Statute Law Revision Act 1894.

Consolidated Fund (No. 3) Act 1881
- Act of Parliament
- Parliament of the United Kingdom
- Long title: An Act to apply the sum of Six million nine hundred and seventy-five thousand six hundred and twenty-seven pounds out of the Consolidated Fund to the service of the year ending on the thirty-first day of March one thousand eight hundred and eighty-two.
- Citation: 44 & 45 Vict. c. 15

Dates
- Royal assent: 27 June 1881

Other legislation
- Repealed by: Statute Law Revision Act 1894

Status: Repealed

Text of statute as originally enacted

- The Consolidated Fund (No. 3) Act 1881 (44 & 45 Vict. c. 15). This act received royal assent on 27 June 1881, and was repealed by the first schedule to the Statute Law Revision Act 1894.

Consolidated Fund (No. 4) Act 1881
- Act of Parliament
- Parliament of the United Kingdom
- Long title: An Act to apply the sum of Twenty-one million six hundred and ninety-five thousand seven hundred and twelve pounds out of the Consolidated Fund to the service of the year ending on the thirty-first day of March one thousand eight hundred and eighty-two.
- Citation: 44 & 45 Vict. c. 50

Dates
- Royal assent: 22 August 1881

Other legislation
- Repealed by: Statute Law Revision Act 1894

Status: Repealed

Text of statute as originally enacted

- The Consolidated Fund (No. 4) Act 1881 (44 & 45 Vict. c. 50). This act received royal assent on 22 August 1881, and was repealed by the first schedule to the Statute Law Revision Act 1894.

===== 1882 =====
Consolidated Fund (No. 1) Act 1882
- Act of Parliament
- Parliament of the United Kingdom
- Citation: 45 & 46 Vict. c. 1

Other legislation
- Repealed by: Statute Law Revision Act 1898

Status: Repealed

- The Consolidated Fund (No. 1) Act 1882 (45 & 46 Vict. c. 1). Repealed by the Statute Law Revision Act 1898.

Consolidated Fund (No. 2) Act 1882
- Act of Parliament
- Parliament of the United Kingdom
- Citation: 45 & 46 Vict. c. 4

Other legislation
- Repealed by: Statute Law Revision Act 1898

Status: Repealed

- The Consolidated Fund (No. 2) Act 1882 (45 & 46 Vict. c. 4). Repealed by the Statute Law Revision Act 1898.

Consolidated Fund (No. 3) Act 1882
- Act of Parliament
- Parliament of the United Kingdom
- Citation: 45 & 46 Vict. c. 8

Other legislation
- Repealed by: Statute Law Revision Act 1898

Status: Repealed

- The Consolidated Fund (No. 3) Act 1882 (45 & 46 Vict. c. 8). Repealed by the Statute Law Revision Act 1898.

Consolidated Fund (No. 4) Act 1882
- Act of Parliament
- Parliament of the United Kingdom
- Citation: 45 & 46 Vict. c. 28

Other legislation
- Repealed by: Statute Law Revision Act 1898

Status: Repealed

- The Consolidated Fund (No. 4) Act 1882 (45 & 46 Vict. c. 28). Repealed by the Statute Law Revision Act 1898.

===== 1883 =====
Consolidated Fund (No. 1) Act 1883
- Act of Parliament
- Parliament of the United Kingdom
- Citation: 46 & 47 Vict. c. 2

- The Consolidated Fund (No. 1) Act 1883 (46 & 47 Vict. c. 2)

Consolidated Fund (No. 2) Act 1883
- Act of Parliament
- Parliament of the United Kingdom
- Citation: 46 & 47 Vict. c. 5

- The Consolidated Fund (No. 2) Act 1883 (46 & 47 Vict. c. 5)

Consolidated Fund (No. 3) Act 1883
- Act of Parliament
- Parliament of the United Kingdom
- Citation: 46 & 47 Vict. c. 13

- The Consolidated Fund (No. 3) Act 1883 (46 & 47 Vict. c. 13)

Consolidated Fund (No. 4) Act 1883
- Act of Parliament
- Parliament of the United Kingdom
- Citation: 46 & 47 Vict. c. 23

- The Consolidated Fund (No. 4) Act 1883 (46 & 47 Vict. c. 23)
