= Remission of Penalties Act 1859 =

Act of the Parliament of the United Kingdom

Remission of Penalties Act 1859 (Note: The citation of this act by this short title was authorised by section 1 of, and the first schedule to, the Short Titles Act 1896. Due to the repeal of those provisions it is now authorised by section 19(2) of the Interpretation Act 1978.)
- Act of Parliament
- Parliament of the United Kingdom
- Long title: An Act to amend the Law concerning the Remission of Penalties.
- Citation: 22 Vict. c. 32
- Territorial extent: United Kingdom

Dates
- Royal assent: 19 April 1859
- Commencement: 19 April 1859 (Note: The Acts of Parliament (Commencement) Act 1793.)
Other legislation
Amended by	Statute Law Revision Act 1892

Status: Partially repealed

Text of statute as originally enacted

Revised text of statute as amended

Text of the Remission of Penalties Act 1859 as in force today (including any amendments) within the United Kingdom, from legislation.gov.uk.

The Remission of Penalties Act 1859 (22 Vict. c. 32) is an act of the Parliament of the United Kingdom. It allows the Crown to remit penalties for offences that are payable to parties other than the Crown.

== Provisions ==
=== Section 1 - Penalties for offences may be remitted by the Crown although payable to parties other than the Crown ===
It shall be lawful for Her Majesty... to remit in whole or in part any sum of money which under any Act now in force or hereafter to be passed may be imposed as a penalty or forfeiture on a convicted offender, although such money may be in whole or in part payable to some party other than the Crown, and to extend the Royal mercy to any person who may be imprisoned for non-payment of any sum of money so imposed, although the same may be in whole or in part payable to some party other than the Crown.

The words "or in Ireland for the Lord Lieutenant or other Chief Governor or Governors of Ireland" were repealed by the Statute Law Revision Act 1892 and by article 14(2) of, and Schedule 6 to, the Northern Ireland (Modification of Enactments-No 1) Order 1973 (SI 1973/2163).

See Todd v Robinson (1884) 14 QBD 739, (1884) 54 LJQB 47, CA.

"... payable to some party other than the Crown ..."

This formerly included a penalty payable to a common informer. Such penalties were abolished by section 1 of the Common Informers Act 1951 (14 & 15 Geo. 6. c. 39).

== Subsequent developments ==
The whole act was repealed by section 1 of, and the schedule to, the Statute Law Revision Act 1892 (55 & 56 Vict. c. 19), which came into force on 20 June 1892.

This act was repealed for the Republic of Ireland by section 26 of, and the second schedule to, the Criminal Justice Act 1951.

== See also ==
- Halsbury's Statutes
