= List of acts of the Parliament of the United Kingdom from 1859 =

This is a complete list of acts of the Parliament of the United Kingdom for the year 1859.

Note that the first parliament of the United Kingdom was held in 1801; parliaments between 1707 and 1800 were either parliaments of Great Britain or of Ireland). For acts passed up until 1707, see the list of acts of the Parliament of England and the list of acts of the Parliament of Scotland. For acts passed from 1707 to 1800, see the list of acts of the Parliament of Great Britain. See also the list of acts of the Parliament of Ireland.

For acts of the devolved parliaments and assemblies in the United Kingdom, see the list of acts of the Scottish Parliament, the list of acts of the Northern Ireland Assembly, and the list of acts and measures of Senedd Cymru; see also the list of acts of the Parliament of Northern Ireland.

The number shown after each act's title is its chapter number. Acts passed before 1963 are cited using this number, preceded by the year(s) of the reign during which the relevant parliamentary session was held; thus the Union with Ireland Act 1800 is cited as "39 & 40 Geo. 3 c. 67", meaning the 67th act passed during the session that started in the 39th year of the reign of George III and which finished in the 40th year of that reign. Note that the modern convention is to use Arabic numerals in citations (thus "41 Geo. 3" rather than "41 Geo. III"). Acts of the last session of the Parliament of Great Britain and the first session of the Parliament of the United Kingdom are both cited as "41 Geo. 3".

Some of these acts have a short title. Some of these acts have never had a short title. Some of these acts have a short title given to them by later acts, such as by the Short Titles Act 1896.

== 22 Vict. ==
The third session of the 17th Parliament of the United Kingdom, which met from 3 February 1859 until 19 April 1859.

=== Public general acts ===
Short title	Citation	Royal assent
Long title
Burial Act 1859	22 Vict. c. 1	25 March 1859
An Act more effectively to prevent Danger to the Public Health from Places of Burial.
Anniversary Days Observance Act 1859 or the Observance of November 5, May 29, etc. Act 1859 (repealed)	22 Vict. c. 2	25 March 1859
An Act to repeal certain Acts and Parts of Acts which relate to the Observance of the Thirtieth of January and other Days. (Repealed by Statute Law Revision Act 1875 (38 & 39 Vict. c. 66))
Annual Inclosure Act 1859 or the Inclosure Act 1859 or the Inclosures Act 1859	22 Vict. c. 3	25 March 1859
An Act to authorize the Inclosure of certain Lands in pursuance of a Report of the Inclosure Commissioners for England and Wales.
Mutiny Act 1859 (repealed)	22 Vict. c. 4	25 March 1859
An Act for punishing Mutiny and Desertion, and for the better Payment of the Army and their Quarters. (Repealed by Statute Law Revision Act 1875 (38 & 39 Vict. c. 66))
Marine Mutiny Act 1859 (repealed)	22 Vict. c. 5	25 March 1859
An Act for the Regulation of Her Majesty's Royal Marine Forces while on shore. (Repealed by Statute Law Revision Act 1875 (38 & 39 Vict. c. 66))
Supply Act 1859 or the Consolidated Fund (£1,222,383 8s. 9d.) Act (repealed)	22 Vict. c. 6	25 March 1859
An Act to apply the Sum of One million two hundred twenty-two thousand three hundred and eighty-three Pounds Eight Shillings and Ninepence out of the Consolidated Fund to the Service of the Year ending the Thirty-first Day of March One thousand eight hundred and fifty-nine. (Repealed by Statute Law Revision Act 1875 (38 & 39 Vict. c. 66))
Supply (No. 2) Act 1859 or the Consolidated Fund (£11,000,000) Act (repealed)	22 Vict. c. 7	25 March 1859
An Act to apply the Sum of Eleven Millions out of the Consolidated Fund to the Service of the Year One thousand eight hundred and fifty-nine. (Repealed by Statute Law Revision Act 1875 (38 & 39 Vict. c. 66))
County Courts Westminster and Southwark Act 1859 (repealed)	22 Vict. c. 8	25 March 1859
An Act to repeal the Thirty-second Section of the Act "for the more easy Recovery of Small Debts and Demands in England," (Note: County Courts Act 1846 (9 & 10 Vict. c. 95)) and to make further Provision in lieu thereof. (Repealed by County Courts Act 1888 (51 & 52 Vict. c. 43))
Exchange of Ecclesiastical Patronage Act 1859	22 Vict. c. 9	25 March 1859
An Act to effect an Exchange of Ecclesiastical Patronage between Her Majesty the Queen and Miss Sophia Broadley.
Affirmations by Quakers, etc. Act 1859 (repealed)	22 Vict. c. 10	8 April 1859
An Act to settle the Form of Affirmation to be made in certain Cases by Quakers and others Persons by Law permitted to make an Affirmation instead of taking an Oath. (Repealed by Promissory Oaths Act 1871 (34 & 35 Vict. c. 48))
East India Loan Act 1859 (repealed)	22 Vict. c. 11	8 April 1859
An Act to enable the Secretary of State in Council of India to raise Money in the United Kingdom for the Service of the Government of India. (Repealed by East India Loans Act 1937 (1 Edw. 8 & 1 Geo. 6. c. 14))
Defence Act 1859	22 Vict. c. 12	8 April 1859
An Act to make further provision for the purchase of common and other rights by Her Majesty’s Principal Secretary of State for the War Department, and in relation to land vested in or taken by such Secretary of State.
Patents for Inventions Act 1859 (repealed)	22 Vict. c. 13	8 April 1859
An Act to amend the Law concerning Patents for Inventions with respect to Inventions for Improvements in Instruments and Munitions of War. (Repealed by Patents, Designs, and Trade Marks Act 1883 (46 & 47 Vict. c. 57))
Manor Courts Abolition (Ireland) Act 1859 (repealed)	22 Vict. c. 14	19 April 1859
An Act for the Abolition of Manor Courts and the better Recovery of Small Debts in Ireland. (Note: The Manor Courts Abolition (Ireland) Act 1859 transferred disputes which were previously dealt with by the manor courts to the petty sessions courts.) (Repealed by Summary Jurisdiction and Criminal Justice Act (Northern Ireland) 1935 (25 & 26 Geo. 5. c. 13 (N.I.)))
Indemnity Act 1859 (repealed)	22 Vict. c. 15	19 April 1859
An Act to indemnify such Persons in the United Kingdom as have omitted to qualify themselves for Offices and Employments, and to extend the Time limited for those Purposes respectively. (Repealed by Promissory Oaths Act 1871 (34 & 35 Vict. c. 48))
Commissioners for Oaths, Bail in Error, etc. Act 1859 (repealed)	22 Vict. c. 16	19 April 1859
An Act to enable the Judges to appoint Commissioners within Ten Miles of London and in the Isle of Man and the Channel Islands to administer Oaths in Common Law, and to authorize the taking in the Country of Bail in Error, and Recognizances and Bail on the Revenue Side of the Exchequer. (Repealed by Statute Law Revision Act 1892 (55 & 56 Vict. c. 19))
Savings Banks (Ireland) Act 1859 (repealed)	22 Vict. c. 17	19 April 1859
An Act to continue an Act of the Eleventh and Twelfth Years of Her present Majesty, (Note: Savings Banks (Ireland) Act 1848 (11 & 12 Vict. c. 133)) for amending the Laws relating to Savings Banks in Ireland. (Repealed by Statute Law Revision Act 1875 (38 & 39 Vict. c. 66))
Nottingham Charities Act 1859	22 Vict. c. 18	19 April 1859
An Act for amending and confirming a Scheme of the Charity Commissioners for Sir Thomas White's Charity, and the Free Grammar School in the Town of Nottingham.
	Scheme for the Application and Management of the Charities in the Town of Nottingham, called Sir Thomas White's Charity (so far as relates to the Nottingham Branch thereof), and the Free Grammar School of the Foundation of Agnes Mellers.	
Public Offices Extension Act 1859	22 Vict. c. 19	19 April 1859
An Act to make further Provision for enabling the Commissioners of Her Majesty's Works to acquire a Site for additional Offices for the Public Service near Whitehall and Her Majesty's Palace at Westminster.
Evidence by Commission Act 1859 (repealed)	22 Vict. c. 20	19 April 1859
An Act to provide for taking Evidence in Suits and Proceedings pending before Tribunals in Her Majesty's Dominions in Places out of the Jurisdiction of such Tribunals. (Repealed by Evidence (Proceedings in other Jurisdictions) Act 1975 (c. 34))
Medical Act 1859 (repealed)	22 Vict. c. 21	19 April 1859
An Act to amend the Medical Act (1858). (Note: Medical Act 1858 (21 & 22 Vict. c. 90)) (Repealed by Medical Act 1956 (4 & 5 Eliz. 2. c. 76))
Exchequer Bills Act 1859 (repealed)	22 Vict. c. 22	19 April 1859
An Act for raising the Sum of Thirteen million two hundred and seventy-seven thousand four hundred Pounds by Exchequer Bills, for the Service of the Year One thousand eight hundred and fifty-nine. (Repealed by Statute Law Revision Act 1875 (38 & 39 Vict. c. 66))
Appropriation Act 1859 (repealed)	22 Vict. c. 23	19 April 1859
An Act to apply a Sum out of the Consolidated Fund to the Service of the Year One thousand eight hundred and fifty-nine, and to appropriate the Supplies granted in this Session of Parliament. (Repealed by Statute Law Revision Act 1875 (38 & 39 Vict. c. 66))
Confirmation of Marriages Act 1859 (repealed)	22 Vict. c. 24	19 April 1859
An Act to render valid certain Marriages in the Church of Saint James Baldersby in the County of York. (Repealed by Statute Law (Repeals) Act 1977 (c. 18))
Convict Prisons Abroad Act 1859 (repealed)	22 Vict. c. 25	19 April 1859
An Act for the Government of the Convict Prisons in Her Majesty's Dominions Abroad (Repealed for the United Kingdom by Administration of Justice Act 1965 (c. 2) and for the Isle of Man by Statute Law (Repeals) Act 2004 (c. 14))
Superannuation Act 1859 (repealed)	22 Vict. c. 26	19 April 1859
An Act to amend the Laws concerning Superannuations and other Allowances to Persons having held Civil Offices in the Public Service. (Repealed by Superannuation Act 1965 (c. 74))
Recreation Grounds Act 1859 (repealed)	22 Vict. c. 27	19 April 1859
An Act to facilitate Grants of Land to be made near populous Places for the Use of Regulated Recreation of Adults, and as Playgrounds for Children. (Repealed for England and Wales by Charities Act 1960 (8 & 9 Eliz. 2. c. 58) and for Northern Ireland by Charities Act (Northern Ireland) 1964 (c. 33 (N.I.)))
Naval Medical Supplemental Fund Society Act 1859 (repealed)	22 Vict. c. 28	19 April 1859
An Act to continue the Act for the Regulation of the Annuities and Premiums of the Naval Medical Supplemental Fund Society. (Repealed by Naval Medical Compassionate Fund Act 1915 (5 & 6 Geo. 5. c. 28))
Poor Law Charges Act 1859 (repealed)	22 Vict. c. 29	19 April 1859
An Act to continue the Act for charging the Maintenance of certain Paupers upon the Union Funds. (Repealed by Statute Law Revision Act 1875 (38 & 39 Vict. c. 66))
Confirmation and Probate Amendment Act 1859	22 Vict. c. 30	19 April 1859
An Act to amend the Confirmation and Probate Act, 1858.
Local Government Supplemental Act 1859	22 Vict. c. 31	19 April 1859
An Act to confirm certain Provisional Orders under the Local Government Act (1858). (Note: Local Government Act 1858 (21 & 22 Vict. c. 98))
	Provisional Order authorizing the borrowing of 8,500l. by the Worthing Local Board of Health, and the reborrowing of so much of their present Debt of 15,000l. as is still owing by the said Board.	
	Provisional Order for extending the Borrowing Powers of the Nantwich Local Board of Health.	
	Provisional Order repealing and altering Parts of a Local Act (Note: Worthing Improvement Act 1821 (1 & 2 Geo. 4. c. lix)) in force within the District of the Worthing Local Board of Health.	
	Provisional Order for altering the Boundaries of the District of Newton Heath in the County Palatine of Lancaster, as constituted for the Purposes of the Public Health Act, 1848. (Note: Public Health Act 1848 (11 & 12 Vict. c. 63))	
Remission of Penalties Act 1859	22 Vict. c. 32	19 April 1859
An Act to amend the Law concerning the Remission of Penalties.
Coroners' Inquests, Bail Act 1859 (repealed)	22 Vict. c. 33	19 April 1859
An Act to enable Coroners in England to admit to Bail Persons charged with Manslaughter. (Repealed by Coroners Act 1887 (50 & 51 Vict. c. 71))
Combination of Workmen Act 1859 (repealed)	22 Vict. c. 34	19 April 1859
An Act to amend and explain an Act of the Sixth Year of the Reign of King George the Fourth, (Note: Combinations of Workmen Act 1825 (6 Geo. 4. c. 129)) to repeal the Laws relating to the Combination of Workmen and to make other Provisions in lieu thereof. (Repealed by Criminal Law Amendment Act 1871 (34 & 35 Vict. c. 32))
Municipal Corporation Act 1859 (repealed)	22 Vict. c. 35	19 April 1859
An Act to amend the Law relating to Municipal Elections. (Repealed for England and Wales by Municipal Corporations Act 1882 (45 & 46 Vict. c. 50) and for Ireland by Local Government (Ireland) Act 1898 (61 & 62 Vict. c. 37))

=== Local acts ===
Short title	Citation	Royal assent
Long title
Shepton Mallet Waterworks Act 1859	22 Vict. c. i	8 April 1859
An Act for more effectually supplying with Water the Town of Shepton Mallet and the Neighbourhood thereof in the County of Somerset.
Swansea Vale Railway Act 1859	22 Vict. c. ii	8 April 1859
An Act to enable the Swansea Vale Railway Company to raise further Money; and for other Purposes.
Wimbledon and Dorking, and Epsom and Leatherhead Railways (Epsom Joint Station) Act 1859	22 Vict. c. iii	8 April 1859
An Act for providing a Joint Station at Epsom for the Use of the Wimbledon and Dorking and Epsom and Leatherhead Railway Companies; and for other Purposes.
Kirkwall Harbour Act 1859 (repealed)	22 Vict. c. iv	19 April 1859
An Act for enlarging, improving, and maintaining the Harbour of the Burgh of Kirkwall in the County of Orkney; and for other Purposes. (Repealed by Orkney Islands Council Order Confirmation Act 1978 (c. iv))
Weymouth and Melcombe Regis Markets and Pier Amendment Act 1859	22 Vict. c. v	19 April 1859
An Act to alter, amend, and enlarge the Powers and Provisions of "The Weymouth and Melcombe Regis Markets and Pier Act, 1854." (Note: Weymouth and Melcombe Regis Markets and Pier Act 1854 (17 & 18 Vict. c. xxxv))
Sunderland and South Shields Waterworks Amendment Act 1859	22 Vict. c. vi	19 April 1859
An Act to enable the Sunderland and South Shields Water Company to extend their Works, and obtain a further Supply of Water, and to raise additional Capital; and for other Purposes.
Londonderry Bridge Act 1859	22 Vict. c. vii	19 April 1859
An Act to repeal the existing Acts relating to the Bridge over the River Foyle at Londonderry, to authorize the Removal of the existing Bridge, and the Construction of a new Bridge, with Approaches thereto, and other Works; and for other Purposes.
Findhorn Railway Act 1859	22 Vict. c. viii	19 April 1859
An Act for making a Railway from the Inverness and Aberdeen Junction Railway at or near Kinloss to Findhorn.
Glasgow Corporation Waterworks Amendment Act 1859	22 Vict. c. ix	19 April 1859
An Act to authorize the Commissioners of the Glasgow Corporation Waterworks to raise a further Sum of Money; and to amend "The Glasgow Corporation Waterworks Act, 1855." (Note: Glasgow Corporation Waterworks Act 1855 (18 & 19 Vict. c. cxviii))
Tralee and Killarney Railway Act 1859	22 Vict. c. x	19 April 1859
An Act for reviving the Powers and extending the Time for the Completion of the Railway and Works authorized by "The Tralee and Killarney Railway Act, 1853." (Note: Tralee and Killarney Railway Act 1853 (16 & 17 Vict. c. clxxxix))
Aberdeen and Turriff Railway Amendment Act 1859	22 Vict. c. xi	19 April 1859
An Act to grant further Powers to "The Banff, Macduff, and Turriff Junction Railway Company," and to change the Name of the Company.
Formartine and Buchan Railway (Deviation) Act 1859	22 Vict. c. xii	19 April 1859
An Act to enable the Formartine and Buchan Railway Company to divert their Railway near Ellon, and to abandon the Branch to Ellon.
Great Western and Brentford Railway Leasing Act 1859	22 Vict. c. xiii	19 April 1859
An Act for authorizing a Lease of the Great Western and Brentford Railway, and the Docks and Works connected therewith, to the Great Western Railway Company; and for other Purposes.
Whitehaven Town and Harbour Act 1859	22 Vict. c. xiv	19 April 1859
An Act for transferring the Government of the new Limits of the Harbour of Whitehaven in the County of Cumberland to the Harbour Trustees; for making better Provision for the Election of Trustees; and for the Alteration of certain Rates and Duties payable in respect of the said Harbour and in the Town of Whitehaven.
City of Norwich Waterworks Act 1859 (repealed)	22 Vict. c. xv	19 April 1859
An Act for regulating the Capital and Borrowing Powers of the City of Norwich Waterworks Company, and for making better Provision against the Waste of Water supplied by them; and for other Purposes. (Repealed by Norwich City Council Act 1984 (c. xxiii))
Falmouth Docks and Harbour Act 1859 (repealed)	22 Vict. c. xvi	19 April 1859
An Act for making Docks and other Works in Falmouth Harbour in the County of Cornwall; and for other Purposes. (Repealed by Falmouth Docks Act 1959 (7 & 8 Eliz. 2. c. xl))
Glasgow Public Parks Act 1859 (repealed)	22 Vict. c. xvii	19 April 1859
An Act to enable the Magistrates and Council of the City of Glasgow to lay out, maintain, and improve the Kelvingrove and Queen's Parks and the Galleries of Art and Corporation Halls in the said City; and for other Purposes. (Repealed by Glasgow Public Parks Act 1878 (41 & 42 Vict. c. lx))
Kingstown Waterworks Act 1859	22 Vict. c. xviii	19 April 1859
An Act for better supplying with Water the Inhabitants of the Towns of Kingstown, Monkstown, Dalkey, Bullock, Glasthule, and the Neighbourhood thereof, in the County of Dublin.
York Improvement (Foss Abandonment) Act 1859	22 Vict. c. xix	19 April 1859
An Act to authorize the Abandonment of the Foss Navigation from a Point about Two hundred Yards above the York Union Workhouse near the City of York; to alter, repeal, and amend the Acts relating to the said Navigation; and for other Purposes.
Mersey Docks Act 1859 (repealed)	22 Vict. c. xx	19 April 1859
An Act to authorize the Mersey Docks and Harbour Board to raise a further Sum of Money for Works at Liverpool. (Repealed by Mersey Docks and Harbour Act 1971 (c. lvii))
Poole Waterworks Act 1859 (repealed)	22 Vict. c. xxi	19 April 1859
An Act for better supplying with Water the Town of Poole and Places adjacent thereto; and for other Purposes. (Repealed by Poole Corporation Water Act 1906 (6 Edw. 7. c. clxxix))
Accidental Death Insurance Company's Act 1859	22 Vict. c. xxii	19 April 1859
An Act to dissolve the Accidental Death Insurance Company, and to transfer the Business of that Company to the Travellers and Marine Insurance Company, to be hereafter called "The Accidental Death Insurance Company;" and for other Purposes.
Cork and Kinsale Junction Railway Act 1859	22 Vict. c. xxiii	19 April 1859
An Act for making a Railway from the Cork and Bandon Railway to the Town of Kinsale in the County of Cork, with a Branch Railway or Tramway to Kinsale Harbour; and for other Purposes.
Fishguard Harbour Act 1859	22 Vict. c. xxiv	19 April 1859
An Act for building and maintaining a Pier in the Harbour of Fishguard in the County of Pembroke, and making and constructing a Road and Quay in extension of the present Quay in the Town of Fishguard, and deepening and otherwise improving the said Harbour.
European Assurance Society's Act 1859	22 Vict. c. xxv	19 April 1859
An Act for changing the Name of "The People's Provident Assurance Society" to the Name "The European Assurance Society;" and for authorizing the taking of the Guarantee of the Society instead of other Security required from Persons in Public Offices and Employments; and for other Purposes.
Scarborough Gas Act 1859 (repealed)	22 Vict. c. xxvi	19 April 1859
An Act to enable the Scarborough Gas Company to raise a further Sum of Money; and for other Purposes. (Repealed by Scarborough Gas (Consolidation) Act 1927 (17 & 18 Geo. 5. c. xcv))
Standard Life Assurance Company's Act 1859 (repealed)	22 Vict. c. xxvii	19 April 1859
An Act for making further Provisions with respect to the Standard Life Assurance Company. (Repealed by Standard Life Assurance Company's Act 1910 (10 Edw. 7 & 1 Geo. 5. c. x))
East Suffolk Railway Act 1859	22 Vict. c. xxviii	19 April 1859
An Act to enable the East Suffolk Railway Company to extend their Railway to Aldborough in the County of Suffolk; and for other Purposes.
Victoria (London) Dock Act 1859	22 Vict. c. xxix	19 April 1859
An Act to extend the Time for the Completion of certain Works of the Victoria (London) Dock Company; and for other Purposes.
Commercial Docks Amendment Act 1859 (repealed)	22 Vict. c. xxx	19 April 1859
An Act to grant further Powers to the Commercial Dock Company. (Repealed by Surrey Commercial Dock Act 1864 (27 & 28 Vict. c. xxxi))
Ballymena and Portrush Railway (Coleraine Junction) Act 1859	22 Vict. c. xxxi	19 April 1859
An Act to enable the Ballymena, Ballymoney, Coleraine and Portrush Junction Railway Company to make a Junction Railway at Coleraine.
King's Lynn Waterworks and Borough Improvement Act 1859	22 Vict. c. xxxii	19 April 1859
An Act for making further Provision for the better Supply of Water to the Borough of King's Lynn and adjacent Districts; for regulating the Markets and Fairs of the Borough; for the Improvement and Regulation of the Borough; and for other Purposes.
Tavistock Markets Act 1859	22 Vict. c. xxxiii	19 April 1859
An Act for constructing Market Houses and other Buildings, and making Market Places, and for better regulating and maintaining the Markets and Fairs, in or near the Town of Tavistock; and for opening a new Street and otherwise improving the said Town; and for other Purposes.
Leominster and Kington Railway Amendment Act 1859	22 Vict. c. xxxiv	19 April 1859
An Act to grant further Powers to the Leominster and Kington Railway Company.
Great Northern Railway Act 1859	22 Vict. c. xxxv	19 April 1859
An Act to facilitate the Communication between the Great Northern Railway and the North London Railway; to improve the Station of the Great Northern Railway at King's Cross; and to enable the Great Northern Railway Company to make Arrangements with regard to certain Parts of their Capital and that of the East Lincolnshire Railway Company.

=== Private acts ===
Short title	Citation	Royal assent
Long title
Charles and Lady Edith Clifton's Name Act 1859	22 Vict. c. 1 Pr.	25 March 1859
An Act to authorize Charles Frederick Clifton Esquire and the Lady Edith Maud his Wife, and their Issue, to assume and bear the Surnames of "Abney Hastings" in lieu of the Surname of Clifton, and to bear the Arms of "Abney" and "Hastings" in compliance with the Condition contained in a Settlement made by Sir Charles Abney Hastings Baronet, deceased, of certain Estates in the Counties of Derby and Leicester.
Purdy's Disabilities Removal Act 1859 (Note: This act was not printed by the Queen's Printer.)	22 Vict. c. 2 Pr.	19 April 1859
An Act to enable Thomas Augustus Purdy Clerk to exercise his Office of Priest and to hold any Benefice or Preferment in the United Church of England and Ireland.

=== Sources ===
- A Collection of the Public General Statutes, Passed in the Twenty-second Year of the Reign of Her Majesty Queen Victoria. London: Eyre & Spottiswoode. 1859 – via Google Books.
- Richards, George Kettilby (1859). The Statutes of the United Kingdom of Great Britain and Ireland, 22 Victoria, 1859. London: Eyre & Spottiswoode – via Internet Archive.
- Journals of the House of Commons (PDF). Vol. 114.

== 22 & 23 Vict. ==
The first session of the 18th Parliament of the United Kingdom, which met from 31 May 1859 until 13 August 1859.

=== Public general acts ===
Short title	Citation	Royal assent
Long title
Clerk of the Council Act 1859	22 & 23 Vict. c. 1	21 July 1859
An Act to provide for the Authentication of certain Orders of the Privy Council in the Absence of the Clerk of the Council in Ordinary.
Supply (No. 3) Act 1859 or the Consolidated Fund (£7,000,000) Act (repealed)	22 & 23 Vict. c. 2	1 August 1859
An Act to apply the Sum of Seven Millions out of the Consolidated Fund to the Service of the Year One thousand eight hundred and fifty-nine. (Repealed by Statute Law Revision Act 1875 (38 & 39 Vict. c. 66))
Public Health Act 1859 (repealed)	22 & 23 Vict. c. 3	1 August 1859
An Act to amend and make perpetual "The Public Health Act, 1858." (Note: Public Health Act 1858 (21 & 22 Vict. c. 97)) (Repealed by Statute Law Revision Act 1875 (38 & 39 Vict. c. 66))
Middlesex Sessions Act 1859 (repealed)	22 & 23 Vict. c. 4	8 August 1859
An Act to amend the Act (Note: Middlesex Sessions Act 1844 (7 & 8 Vict. c. 71)) for the better Administration of Criminal Justice in Middlesex. (Repealed by Administration of Justice Act 1964 (c. 42))
House of Commons Act 1859 (repealed)	22 & 23 Vict. c. 5	8 August 1859
An Act to remove Doubts as to the Qualification of Persons holding Diplomatic Pensions to sit in Parliament. (Repealed by Diplomatic Salaries, &c. Act 1869 (32 & 33 Vict. c. 43))
High Court of Admiralty Act 1859 (repealed)	22 & 23 Vict. c. 6	8 August 1859
An Act to enable Serjeants, Barristers-at-Law, Attorneys, and Solicitors to practise in the High Court of Admiralty. (Repealed by Statute Law Revision and Civil Procedure Act 1881 (44 & 45 Vict. c. 59))
Jury Trials (Scotland) Act 1859 (repealed)	22 & 23 Vict. c. 7	8 August 1859
An Act to amend an Act of the Seventeenth and Eighteenth Years of Her Majesty, (Note: Jury Trials (Scotland) Act 1854 (17 & 18 Vict. c. 59)) for allowing Verdicts on Trials by Jury in Civil Causes in Scotland to be received, although the Jury may not be unanimous. (Repealed by Statute Law Revision Act 1892 (55 & 56 Vict. c. 19))
Boundary Survey (Ireland) Act 1859	22 & 23 Vict. c. 8	8 August 1859
An Act to amend the Act of the Twentieth and Twenty-first Years of Victoria, Chapter Forty-five, (Note: Boundary Survey (Ireland) Act 1857 (20 & 21 Vict. c. 45)) relating to the Survey of Boundaries in Ireland.
Chief Superintendent in China Act 1859 (repealed)	22 & 23 Vict. c. 9	8 August 1859
An Act to provide for the Exercise of the Duties of Chief Superintendent in China in certain Cases. (Repealed by Statute Law Revision Act 1950 (14 Geo. 6. c. 6))
Legislative Council of Canada Act 1859 (repealed)	22 & 23 Vict. c. 10	8 August 1859
An Act to empower the Legislature of Canada to make Laws regulating the Appointment of a Speaker of the Legislative Council. (Repealed by Statute Law Revision Act 1892 (55 & 56 Vict. c. 19))
Local Government Supplemental Act 1859 (No. 2) or the Local Government Supplemental (No. 2) Act 1859	22 & 23 Vict. c. 11	8 August 1859
An Act to confirm certain Provisional Orders under the Local Government Act (1858). (Note: Local Government Act 1858 (21 & 22 Vict. c. 98))
	Leamington Provisional Order 1859 Provisional Order for altering the Boundaries of the District of Leamington in the County of Warwick, and the Day of Election of the Local Board of the said District.	
	Teignmouth Provisional Order 1859 Provisional Order repealing and altering Parts of a Local Act (Note: Teignmouth Improvement Act 1836 (6 & 7 Will. 4. c. lix)) in force within the District of the Teignmouth Local Board, and providing for the future execution thereof.	
	Wigan Provisional Order 1859 Provisional Order repealing and altering Parts of a Local Act (Note: Wigan Waterworks Act 1853 (16 & 17 Vict. c. lxvii)) in force within the District of the Wigan Local Board of Health.	
	Wigan (Borrowing Powers) Provisional Order 1859 Provisional Order for extending the Borrowing Powers of the Wigan Local Board of Health.	
	Battle Provisional Order 1859 Provisional Order for extending the Borrowing Powers of the Battle Local Board of Health.	
	Knighton Provisional Order 1859 Provisional Order for extending the Borrowing Powers of the Knighton Local Board of Health.	
	Cardiff Provisional Order 1859 Provisional Order putting in force the Lands Clauses Consolidation Act, 1845, (Note: Lands Clauses Consolidation Act 1845 (8 & 9 Vict. c. 18)) within the District of the Cardiff Local Board of Health, in the County of Glamorgan, for the Purchase of Lands by the said Board for Improvements.	
	Derby Provisional Order 1859 Provisional Order repealing an Exemption from Rating under a Local Act (Note: Derby Improvement Act 1825 (6 Geo. 4. c. cxxxii)) in force within the District of the Derby Local Board of Health.	
Colonial Affidavits Act 1859	22 & 23 Vict. c. 12	8 August 1859
An Act to repeal, as regards the Colony of Victoria) and to enable other Colonial Legislatures to repeal, certain Provisions of the Imperial Acts of the Fifty-fourth Year of George the Third, Chapter Fifteen, (Note: New South Wales (Debts) Act 1813 (54 Geo. 3. c. 15)) and of the Fifth and Sixth Years of William the Fourth, Chapter Sixty-two. (Note: Statutory Declarations Act 1835 (5 & 6 Will. 4. c. 62))
Antigua and Barbuda Act 1859 (repealed)	22 & 23 Vict. c. 13	8 August 1859
An Act to enable Her Majesty to confirm an Act passed by the Legislature of Antigua, intituled "An Act to extend the Operation of the Laws of Antigua to the Island of Barbuda." (Note: Barbuda (Extension of Laws of Antigua) Act (c. 43 (Antigua))) (Repealed by Statute Law Revision Act 1892 (55 & 56 Vict. c. 19))
Pawnbrokers Act 1859 (repealed)	22 & 23 Vict. c. 14	8 August 1859
An Act to amend an Act of the Thirty-ninth and Fortieth Years of King George the Third, (Note: Pawnbrokers Act 1800 (39 & 40 Geo. 3. c. 99)) for better regulating the Business of Pawnbrokers. (Repealed by Pawnbrokers Act 1872 (35 & 36 Vict. c. 93))
Militia Ballots Suspension Act 1859 (repealed)	22 & 23 Vict. c. 15	8 August 1859
An Act to suspend the making of Lists and the Ballots for the Militia of the United Kingdom. (Repealed by Statute Law Revision Act 1875 (38 & 39 Vict. c. 66))
Probate and other Courts and Registries Site Act 1859 (repealed)	22 & 23 Vict. c. 16	8 August 1859
An Act to enable the Commissioners of Her Majesty's Works to acquire a Site for the Purposes of Her Majesty's Court of Probate, and other Courts and Offices. (Repealed by Statute Law Revision Act 1966 (c. 5))
Vexatious Indictments Act 1859 (repealed)	22 & 23 Vict. c. 17	8 August 1859
An Act to prevent Vexatious Indictments for certain Misdemeanors. (Repealed for England and Wales by Administration of Justice (Miscellaneous Provisions) Act 1933 (23 & 24 Geo. 5. c. 36) and for Northern Ireland by Statute Law Revision Act (Northern Ireland) 1954 (c. 35 (N.I.)))
Income Tax Act 1859 (repealed)	22 & 23 Vict. c. 18	13 August 1859
An Act for granting to Her Majesty additional Rates of Income Tax; and to reduce the Period of Credit allowed for Payment of the Excise Duty on Malt. (Repealed by Income Tax Act 1918 (8 & 9 Geo. 5. c. 40))
Universities of Oxford and Cambridge Act 1859	22 & 23 Vict. c. 19	13 August 1859
An Act to repeal Part of an Act passed in the Thirteenth Year of Elizabeth, Chapter Twenty-nine, concerning the several Incorporations of the Universities of Oxford and Cambridge, and the Confirmation of the Charters, Liberties, and Privileges granted to either of them.
Military Savings Banks Act 1859 or the Military Savings Bank Act 1859 (repealed)	22 & 23 Vict. c. 20	13 August 1859
An Act to amend and consolidate the Laws relating to Military Savings Banks. (Repealed by Statute Law Revision Act 1959 (7 & 8 Eliz. 2. c. 68))
Queen's Remembrancer Act 1859	22 & 23 Vict. c. 21	13 August 1859
An Act to regulate the Office of Queen's Remembrancer, and to amend the Practice and Procedure on the Revenue Side of the Court of Exchequer.
Constabulary (Ireland) Act 1859 (repealed)	22 & 23 Vict. c. 22	13 August 1859
An Act to amend the Acts relating to the Constabulary Force in Ireland. (Repealed by Statute Law Revision Act (Northern Ireland) 1954 (c. 35 (N.I.)))
County Cess (Ireland) Act 1859 (repealed)	22 & 23 Vict. c. 23	13 August 1859
An Act to continue certain Acts relating to the Collection of County Cess in Ireland. (Repealed by Statute Law Revision Act 1875 (38 & 39 Vict. c. 66))
Universities (Scotland) Act 1859 (repealed)	22 & 23 Vict. c. 24	13 August 1859
An Act to remove Doubts as to Admission to the Office of Principal in the Universities of Scotland. (Repealed by Universities (Scotland) Act 1889 (52 & 53 Vict. c. 55) and Universities (Scotland) Act 1932 (22 & 23 Geo. 5. c. 26))
Linen, etc., Manufacturers (Ireland) Act 1859 (repealed)	22 & 23 Vict. c. 25	13 August 1859
An Act to continue certain Acts relating to Linen, Hempen, and other Manufactures in Ireland. (Repealed by Statute Law Revision Act 1875 (38 & 39 Vict. c. 66))
North-Western Territories of America Act 1859 (repealed)	22 & 23 Vict. c. 26	13 August 1859
An Act to make further Provision for the Regulation of the Trade with the Indians, and for the Administration of Justice in the North-western Territories of America. (Repealed by Statute Law Revision Act 1950 (14 Geo. 6. c. 6))
European Troops in India Act 1859 (repealed)	22 & 23 Vict. c. 27	13 August 1859
An Act to repeal the Thirty-first Section of the Act of the Sixteenth and Seventeenth Years of Victoria, Chapter Ninety-five, (Note: Government of India Act 1853 (16 & 17 Vict. c. 95)) and to alter the Limit of the Number of European Troops to be maintained for local Service in India. (Repealed by Statute Law Revision Act 1875 (38 & 39 Vict. c. 66))
Galway Harbour and Port Act 1859	22 & 23 Vict. c. 28	13 August 1859
An Act to amend the Galway Harbour and Port Act (1853) (Note: Galway Harbour and Port Act 1853 (16 & 17 Vict. c. ccvii))
Repeal of Nore Tolls Act 1859 (repealed)	22 & 23 Vict. c. 29	13 August 1859
An Act to repeal a certain Toll levied upon Fishing Vessels passing the Nore. (Repealed by Statute Law (Repeals) Act 1978 (c. 45))
Coinage Act 1859 (repealed)	22 & 23 Vict. c. 30	13 August 1859
An Act to extend the Enactments relating to the Copper Coin to Coin of mixed Metal. (Repealed by Coinage Act 1870 (33 & 34 Vict. c. 10))
Court of Probate Act (Ireland) 1859 or the Court of Probate (Ireland) Act 1859	22 & 23 Vict. c. 31	13 August 1859
An Act to amend the Law relating to Probates and Letters of Administration in Ireland.
County and Borough Police Act 1859 or the Police Act 1859 (repealed)	22 & 23 Vict. c. 32	13 August 1859
An Act to amend the Law concerning the Police in Counties and Boroughs in England and Wales. (Repealed by Police Act 1964 (c. 48))
Provisional Order Confirmation Turnpikes Act 1859 (repealed)	22 & 23 Vict. c. 33	13 August 1859
An Act to confirm certain Provisional Orders made under an Act of the Fifteenth Year of Her present Majesty, (Note: Turnpike Trusts (Making of Provisional Orders) Act 1851 (14 & 15 Vict. c. 38)) to facilitate Arrangements for the Belief of Turnpike Trusts. (Repealed by Statute Law (Repeals) Act 1981 (c. 19))
Cambridge University, etc. Act 1859 (repealed)	22 & 23 Vict. c. 34	13 August 1859
An Act to continue the Powers of the Commissioners under an Act of the Nineteenth and Twentieth Years of Her Majesty, (Note: Cambridge University Act 1856 (19 & 20 Vict. c. 88)) concerning the University of Cambridge and the College of King Henry the Sixth at Eton. (Repealed by Statute Law Revision Act 1875 (38 & 39 Vict. c. 66))
Law of Property Amendment Act 1859	22 & 23 Vict. c. 35	13 August 1859
An Act to further amend the Law of Property, and to relieve Trustees.
Probate Duty Act 1859 (repealed)	22 & 23 Vict. c. 36	13 August 1859
An Act to alter the Stamp Duties payable upon Probates of Wills and Letters of Administration, to repeal the Stamp Duties on Licences to exercise the Faculty of Physic, and to amend the Laws relating to Hawkers and Pedlars. (Repealed by Statute Law Revision Act 1875 (38 & 39 Vict. c. 66), Hawkers Act 1888 (51 & 52 Vict. c. 33), Statute Law Revision Act 1892 (55 & 56 Vict. c. 19) and Finance Act 1975 (c. 7))
Customs Amendment Act 1859 or the Customs Act 1859 (repealed)	22 & 23 Vict. c. 37	13 August 1859
An Act for the Amendment of the Laws relating to the Customs. (Repealed by Customs Consolidation Act 1876 (39 & 40 Vict. c. 36))
Militia Act 1859 (repealed)	22 & 23 Vict. c. 38	13 August 1859
An Act further to amend the Laws relating to the Militia. (Repealed by Militia (Voluntary Enlistment) Act 1875 (38 & 39 Vict. c. 69))
East India Loan (No. 2) Act 1859 (repealed)	22 & 23 Vict. c. 39	13 August 1859
An Act to enable the Secretary of State in Council of India to raise Money in the United Kingdom for the Service of the Government of India. (Repealed by East India Loans Act 1937 (1 Edw. 8 & 1 Geo. 6. c. 14))
Royal Naval Reserve (Volunteer) Act 1859 (repealed)	22 & 23 Vict. c. 40	13 August 1859
An Act for the Establishment of a Reserve Volunteer Force of Seamen, and for the Government of the same. (Repealed by Reserve Forces Act 1980 (c. 9))
Government of India Act 1859 (repealed)	22 & 23 Vict. c. 41	13 August 1859
An Act to amend the Act (Note: Government of India Act 1858 (21 & 22 Vict. c. 106)) for the better Government of India. (Repealed by Government of India Act 1915 (5 & 6 Geo. 5. c. 61))
Reserve Force Act 1859 (repealed)	22 & 23 Vict. c. 42	13 August 1859
An Act to provide for the Establishment of a Reserve Force of Men who have been in Her Majesty's Service. (Repealed by Reserve Force Act 1867 (30 & 31 Vict. c. 110))
Inclosure Act 1859	22 & 23 Vict. c. 43	13 August 1859
An Act to amend and extend the Provisions of the Acts for the Inclosure, Exchange, and Improvement of Land.
Poor Rates Act 1859 (repealed)	22 & 23 Vict. c. 44	13 August 1859
An Act to continue the Act (Note: Poor Rate Exemption Act 1840 (3 & 4 Vict. c. 89)) for the Exemption of Stock in Trade from Rating. (Repealed by Statute Law Revision Act 1875 (38 & 39 Vict. c. 66))
Ecclesiastical Jurisdiction Act 1859 (repealed)	22 & 23 Vict. c. 45	13 August 1859
An Act to continue certain temporary Provisions concerning Ecclesiastical Jurisdiction in England. (Repealed by Statute Law Revision Act 1875 (38 & 39 Vict. c. 66))
Episcopal and Capitular Estates Act 1859 (repealed)	22 & 23 Vict. c. 46	13 August 1859
An Act to continue and amend the Act (Note: Episcopal and Capitular Estates Act 1851 (14 & 15 Vict. c. 104)) concerning the Management of Episcopal and Capitular Estates in England. (Repealed by Statute Law (Repeals) Act 1993 (c. 50))
Second Annual Inclosure Act 1859 or the Inclosures Act 1859	22 & 23 Vict. c. 47	13 August 1859
An Act to authorize the Inclosure of certain Lands in pursuance of a Special Report of the Inclosure Commissioners of England and Wales.
Corrupt Practices Act 1859 (repealed)	22 & 23 Vict. c. 48	13 August 1859
An Act to continue the Corrupt Practices Prevention Act, 1854 (Note: Corrupt Practices Prevention Act 1854 (17 & 18 Vict. c. 102)) (Repealed by Statute Law Revision Act 1875 (38 & 39 Vict. c. 66))
Poor Law (Payment of Debts) Act 1859 (repealed)	22 & 23 Vict. c. 49	13 August 1859
An Act to provide for the Payment of Debts incurred by Boards of Guardians in Unions and Parishes and Boards of Management in School Districts. (Repealed by Poor Law Act 1927 (17 & 18 Geo. 5. c. 14))
Roman Catholic Charities Act 1859 (repealed)	22 & 23 Vict. c. 50	13 August 1859
An Act further to continue the Exemption of certain Charities from the Operation of the Charitable Trusts Acts. (Repealed by Statute Law Revision Act 1875 (38 & 39 Vict. c. 66))
Annual Turnpike Acts Continuance Act 1859 (repealed)	22 & 23 Vict. c. 51	13 August 1859
An Act to continue certain Turnpike Acts in Great Britain. (Repealed by Statute Law Revision Act 1875 (38 & 39 Vict. c. 66))
Dublin Police Act 1859 (repealed)	22 & 23 Vict. c. 52	13 August 1859
An Act to amend the Laws relating to the Police District of Dublin Metropolis. (Repealed by Statute Law (Repeals) Act 2013 (c. 2))
Savings Bank (Charitable Societies) Act 1859 (repealed)	22 & 23 Vict. c. 53	13 August 1859
An Act to enable Charitable and Provident Societies and Penny Savings Banks to invest all their Proceeds in Savings Banks. (Repealed by Post Office Savings Bank Act 1954 (2 & 3 Eliz. 2. c. 62))
Militia Pay Act 1859 (repealed)	22 & 23 Vict. c. 54	13 August 1859
An Act to defray the Charge of the Pay, Clothing, and contingent and other Expenses of the Disembodied Militia in Great Britain and Ireland; to grant Allowances in certain Cases to Subaltern Officers, Adjutants, Paymasters, Quartermasters, Surgeons, Assistant Surgeons, and Surgeons Mates of the Militia; and to authorize the Employment of the Noncommissioned Officers. (Repealed by Statute Law Revision Act 1875 (38 & 39 Vict. c. 66))
Appropriation (No. 2) Act 1859 (repealed)	22 & 23 Vict. c. 55	13 August 1859
An Act to apply a Sum out of the Consolidated Fund and the Surplus of Ways and Means to the Service of the Year One thousand eight hundred and fifty-nine; and to appropriate the Supplies granted in this Session of Parliament. (Repealed by Statute Law Revision Act 1875 (38 & 39 Vict. c. 66))
Weights and Measures Act 1859 (repealed)	22 & 23 Vict. c. 56	13 August 1859
An Act to amend the Act of the Fifth and Sixth Years of King William the Fourth, Chapter Sixty-three, (Note: Weights and Measures Act 1835 (5 & 6 Will. 4. c. 63)) relating to Weights and Measures. (Repealed by Weights and Measures Act 1878 (41 & 42 Vict. c. 49))
County Courts Act 1859 or the County Court Judges Act 1859 (repealed)	22 & 23 Vict. c. 57	13 August 1859
An Act limiting the Power of Imprisonment for Small Debts exercised by the County Court Judges. (Repealed by Bankruptcy Repeal and Insolvent Court Act 1869 (32 & 33 Vict. c. 83))
Westminster Bridge Act 1859 (repealed)	22 & 23 Vict. c. 58	13 August 1859
An Act to empower the Commissioners of Her Majesty's Works and Public Buildings to acquire additional Space for the Western Approach to Westminster New Bridge. (Repealed by Local Law (Greater London Council and Inner London Boroughs) Order 1965 (SI 1965/540))
Railway Companies Arbitration Act 1859 (repealed)	22 & 23 Vict. c. 59	13 August 1859
An Act to enable Railway Companies to settle their Differences with other Companies by Arbitration. (Repealed for England and Wales and Scotland by Transport Act 1962 (10 & 11 Eliz. 2. c. 46) and for Northern Ireland by Road Traffic, Transport and Roads (Northern Ireland) Order 1984 (SI 1984/1986 (N.I. 15)))
Holyhead Harbour Railway Act 1859	22 & 23 Vict. c. 60	13 August 1859
An Act to extend the Powers of an Act passed in the Thirteenth and Fourteenth Years of Her Majesty, Chapter One hundred and eleven, (Note: Holyhead Harbour Act 1850 (13 & 14 Vict. c. 111)) relating to the laying down of Railways at Holyhead Harbour.
Matrimonial Causes Act 1859 (repealed)	22 & 23 Vict. c. 61	13 August 1859
An Act to make further Provision concerning the Court for Divorce and Matrimonial Causes. (Repealed by Supreme Court of Judicature (Consolidation) Act 1925 (15 & 16 Geo. 5. c. 49))
Bankruptcy, etc. (Ireland) Act 1859 (repealed)	22 & 23 Vict. c. 62	13 August 1859
An Act to amend the Irish Bankruptcy and Insolvency Act (1857) (Note: Irish Bankruptcy and Insolvency Act 1857 (20 & 21 Vict. c. 60)) (Repealed by Statute Law Revision Act 1875 (38 & 39 Vict. c. 66))
British Law Ascertainment Act 1859	22 & 23 Vict. c. 63	13 August 1859
An Act to afford Facilities for the more certain Ascertainment of the Law administered in one Part of Her Majesty's Dominions when pleaded in the Courts of another Part thereof.
Confirmation of Marriages Act 1859 (repealed)	22 & 23 Vict. c. 64	13 August 1859
An Act to remove Doubts as to the Validity of certain Marriages of British Subjects at Lisbon. (Repealed by Foreign Marriage (Amendment) Act 1988 (c. 44))
Petty Sessional Divisions Act 1859 (repealed)	22 & 23 Vict. c. 65	13 August 1859
An Act for amending the Acts for the better Regulation of Divisions in the several Counties of England and Wales. (Repealed by Justices of the Peace Act 1949 (12, 13 & 14 Geo. 6. c. 101))
Sale of Gas Act 1859 (repealed)	22 & 23 Vict. c. 66	13 August 1859
An Act for regulating Measures used in Sales of Gas. (Repealed for England and Wales and Scotland by Gas Act 1948 (11 & 12 Geo. 6. c. 67) and for Northern Ireland by Gas (Northern Ireland) Order 1977 (SI 1977/596 (N.I. 7)))

=== Local acts ===
Short title	Citation	Royal assent
Long title
Great Western Railway Act 1859	22 & 23 Vict. c. i	21 July 1859
An Act for authorizing the Construction of a Railway for carrying the West London Railway over the Great Western Railway by means of a Bridge, in substitution for the present level Crossing; and for other Purposes.
London and North Western Railway (Edgehill to Garston) Act 1859	22 & 23 Vict. c. ii	21 July 1859
An Act for enabling the London and North-western Railway Company to make a Railway from their existing Line at Edge Hill in the County of Lancaster to the Saint Helen's Railway near Garston in the same County; and for other Purposes.
Caledonian Railway Wilsontown Branches Act 1859	22 & 23 Vict. c. iii	21 July 1859
An Act to enable the Caledonian Railway Company to make Branch Railways to the Wilsontown Mineral Field; and for other Purposes.
Red Sea and India Telegraph Act 1859	22 & 23 Vict. c. iv	21 July 1859
An Act to incorporate the Sed Sea and India Telegraph Company, and for enabling the Company to establish and work Telegraphy between Great Britain and India and other Countries^ and for other Purposes connected therewith.
Manchester London Road Station Act 1859	22 & 23 Vict. c. v	21 July 1859
An Act to provide for the Partition of the London Road Station at Manchester, and for the better Management of certain Portions of the said Station, and for improving the Access thereto.
Pembroke and Tenby Railway Act 1859	22 & 23 Vict. c. vi	21 July 1859
An Act for making Railways from Pembroke Dock to Tenby, and from Pembroke Dock to the Pier at Hobbs Point, in the County of Pembroke.
Tyne Improvement Act 1859 (repealed)	22 & 23 Vict. c. vii	21 July 1859
An Act to amend the Provisions of the Tyne Improvement Acts, to authorize an Alteration of the Piers at the Mouth of the River; and for other Purposes. (Repealed by Port of Tyne Reorganisation Scheme 1967 Confirmation Order 1968 (SI 1968/942))
Great North of Scotland Railway Consolidation Act 1859	22 & 23 Vict. c. viii	21 July 1859
An Act to alter and consolidate the Acts relating to the Great North of Scotland Railway Company; to regulate and define the Company's Capital; and for other Purposes.
Kingston-upon-Thames Gas Amendment Act 1859 (repealed)	22 & 23 Vict. c. ix	21 July 1859
An Act to enable the Kingston-upon-Thames Gas Company to raise further Moneys by Shares and borrowing. (Repealed by Wandsworth, Wimbledon and Epsom District Gas Order 1930 (SR&O 1930/544))
North Eastern Railway (Pateley Bridge Branch) Act 1859	22 & 23 Vict. c. x	21 July 1859
An Act to enable the North-eastern Railway Company to make a Branch from their Leeds and Thirsk Railway to Pateley Bridge; to acquire additional Lands; and for other Purposes.
Reading and Hatfield Turnpike Roads Act 1859 (repealed)	22 & 23 Vict. c. xi	21 July 1859
An Act for the Reading and Hatfield Turnpike Roads in the Counties of Berks, Bucks, Oxford, and Hertford. (Repealed by Berkshire Act 1986 (c. ii))
Gateshead Quay (Second) Act 1859	22 & 23 Vict. c. xii	21 July 1859
An Act for the Completion of the Gateshead Quay in the Borough of Gateshead, and for authorizing Arrangements with the North-eastern Railway Company with respect ta the User of Parts thereof; and for other Purposes.
Hampstead Junction Railway Amendment Act 1859	22 & 23 Vict. c. xiii	21 July 1859
An Act to extend the Time for making the Hampstead Junction Railway, to authorize certain Deviations in the Line thereof, and for other Purposes.
North British and Selkirk Railways Amalgamation Act 1859	22 & 23 Vict. c. xiv	21 July 1859
An Act to amalgamate the Selkirk and Galashiels Railway Company with the North British Railway Company, and for other Purposes.
Lymington Railway Act 1859	22 & 23 Vict. c. xv	21 July 1859
An Act for authorizing the Lymington Railway Company to acquire the Ferry across the Lymington River, and to raise further Capital; and for other Purposes.
Tenbury Railway Act 1859	22 & 23 Vict. c. xvi	21 July 1859
An Act for making a Railway from the Woofferton Station of the Shrewsbury and Hereford Railway in the County of Hereford to a Point near Tenbury in the County of Worcester; and for other Purposes.
Worcester and Hereford Railway Act 1859	22 & 23 Vict. c. xvii	21 July 1859
An Act to enable the Worcester and Hereford Railway Company to make a Branch Railway to the Severn at Worcester, and to enlarge their Station at Hereford; and for other Purposes.
Dundee and Newtyle Railway Improvement Act 1859	22 & 23 Vict. c. xviii	21 July 1859
An Act for enabling the Dundee and Perth and Aberdeen Railway Junction Company to improve the Dundee and Newtyle Railway; and for other Purposes.
Salford Gasworks Act 1859 (repealed)	22 & 23 Vict. c. xix	21 July 1859
An Act to enable the Mayor, Aldermen, and Burgesses of the Borough of Salford to raise a further Sum of Money for improving their Gasworks; and for other Purposes. (Repealed by Salford Improvement Act 1862 (25 & 26 Vict. c. ccv))
Greenwich and South Eastern Docks Act 1859	22 & 23 Vict. c. xx	21 July 1859
An Act to authorize the Construction of Docks and other Works on the South Shore of the River Thames, to be called "The Greenwich and South-eastern Docks."
Price's Patent Candle Company's Act 1859 (repealed)	22 & 23 Vict. c. xxi	21 July 1859
An Act for conferring on Price's Patent Candle Company, Limited, further Powers for the raising of Money; and for other Purposes. (Repealed by Price's Patent Candle Company Limited Act 1920 (10 & 11 Geo. 5. c. iv))
Vale of Neath Railway Act 1859	22 & 23 Vict. c. xxii	21 July 1859
An Act for authorizing divers Arrangements between the Vale of Neath Railway Company and other Companies having Railways or other Works near to the Vale of Neath Railway, and for regulating the Capital and Borrowing Powers of the Company; and for other Purposes.
Atlantic Telegraph Amendment Act 1859	22 & 23 Vict. c. xxiii	21 July 1859
An Act to alter and amend the Acts relating to the Atlantic Telegraph Company; and to enable the Company to raise additional Capital; and for other Purposes.
Border Union (North British) Railways Act 1859 or the Border Union Railway Act 1859	22 & 23 Vict. c. xxiv	21 July 1859
An Act to authorize the North British Railway Company to make a Railway from their Hawick Line to the Port Carlisle Railway near Carlisle, with divers Branches therefrom, and for other Purposes.
Carlisle to Penrith and Penrith to Eamont Bridge Road Act 1859	22 & 23 Vict. c. xxv	21 July 1859
An Act to repeal an Act passed in the Eleventh Year of the Reign of King George the Fourth, Chapter 110, intituled "An Act for more effectually repairing the road from Carlisle to Penrith and from Penrith to Eamont Bridge in the County of Cumberland;" (Note: Road from Carlisle to Penrith and to Eamont Bridge Act 1830 (11 Geo. 4 & 1 Will. 4. c. cx)) and to make other Provisions in lieu thereof.
Much Wenlock and Severn Junction Railway Act 1859	22 & 23 Vict. c. xxvi	21 July 1859
An Act for making a Railway from Much Wenlock in the County of Salop to communicate with the Severn Valley Railway and the River Severn in the same County.
Norwich New Street Act 1859	22 & 23 Vict. c. xxvii	21 July 1859
An Act for making a new Street from near Foundry Bridge to King Street in the City and County of the City of Norwich.
Liverpool Exchange Act 1859 (repealed)	22 & 23 Vict. c. xxviii	21 July 1859
An Act to repeal the Acts relating to the Company of Proprietors of the Liverpool Exchange, and to incorporate the Liverpool Exchange Company, and for other Purposes connected therewith. (Repealed by Liverpool Exchange Act 1988 (c. ix))
Castle Douglas and Dumfries Railway (Amendment) Act 1859	22 & 23 Vict. c. xxix	21 July 1859
An Act to authorize the raising of a further Sum of Money for the Completion of the Castle Douglas and Dumfries Railway, and to sanction a Deviation from the authorized Line of that Railway.
Llanidloes and Newtown Railway (Canal Extension) Act 1859	22 & 23 Vict. c. xxx	21 July 1859
An Act to authorize the Construction of a Tramway from the Llanidloes and Newtown Railway near Newtown to the Shropshire Union Canal; and to enable the Llanidloes and Newtown Railway Company to lease their Undertaking; and for other Purposes.
London and South Western and Portsmouth Railways Amalgamation Act 1859	22 & 23 Vict. c. xxxi	21 July 1859
An Act for authorizing an Amalgamation or Lease of the Portsmouth Railway with or to the London and South-western Railway Company, and for other Purposes.
Forth and Clyde Navigation Act 1859	22 & 23 Vict. c. xxxii	21 July 1859
An Act to extend the Time for the Sale of such Lands belonging to the Company of Proprietors of the Forth and Clyde Navigation as may not be required for the Purposes of the said Navigation.
Hertford, Luton and Dunstable Railway Act 1859	22 & 23 Vict. c. xxxiii	21 July 1859
An Act for authorizing the Hertford, Luton, and Dunstable Railway Company to raise further Capital for the Purposes of the Hertford Section of their Railway; and for extending the Period for the Completion of the Luton Section of their Railway; and for other Purposes.
Maybole and Girvan Railway (Amendment) Act 1859	22 & 23 Vict. c. xxxiv	21 July 1859
An Act to enable the Maybole and Girvan Railway Company to raise additional Capital; to authorize a Deviation of their Line; and for other Purposes.
Caterham and South Eastern Railways Act 1859	22 & 23 Vict. c. xxxv	21 July 1859
An Act for the Transfer of the Caterham Railway to the South-eastern Railway Company, and for other Purposes.
Bagenalstown and Wexford Railway Act 1859	22 & 23 Vict. c. xxxvi	1 August 1859
An Act to revive and extend the Powers of the Bagenalstown and Wexford Railway Company for the Purchase of Lands, and to extend their Powers for completing their Undertaking, and to enable them to make a Deviation in the Line of their Railway, and to increase the Powers of the said Company for borrowing on Mortgage; and to enable the Great Southern and Western Railway Company to subscribe towards the said Undertaking; and to enable the said Companies to make Working and Traffic Arrangements; and for other Purposes.
Dublin and Drogheda Railway Act 1859	22 & 23 Vict. c. xxxvii	1 August 1859
An Act to enable the Dublin and Drogheda Railway Company to create Debenture Stock, and to issue new Shares for redeeming existing Preference Shares subject to Redemption, and to enlarge their Station at Dublin; and for other Purposes.
Newry and Armagh Railway Amendment Act 1859	22 & 23 Vict. c. xxxviii	1 August 1859
An Act to enable the Newry and Armagh Railway Company to make Alterations in their authorized Line of Railway, and to construct a short Branch at Newry.
Norwich Corn Exchange Act 1859	22 & 23 Vict. c. xxxix	1 August 1859
An Act to incorporate "The Norwich Corn Exchange Company, Limited," and to define and regulate their Undertaking.
Gloucester and Cheltenham Tramroads Abandonment Act 1859	22 & 23 Vict. c. xl	1 August 1859
An Act to authorize the Abandonment of the Gloucester and Cheltenham Tramroads, and to enable the Midland and the Great Western Railway Companies to sell and dispose of the same; and for other Purposes.
Ulster Railway Act 1859	22 & 23 Vict. c. xli	1 August 1859
An Act to enable the Ulster Railway Company to extend their Railway from Monaghan to Clones, and to enlarge their Stations at Belfast and Portadown, and to make Arrangements with the Dundalk and Enniskillen Railway Company, and to create Debenture Stock; and for other Purposes.
Bury St. Edmund's Gas Act 1859	22 & 23 Vict. c. xlii	1 August 1859
An Act for authorizing the Bury St, Edmunds Gas Company to raise further Capital; and for regulating their Capital; and for other Purposes.
Border Counties Railway (Liddesdale Section and Deviations) Act 1859	22 & 23 Vict. c. xliii	1 August 1859
An Act for authorizing the Border Counties Railway Company to make and maintain the Liddesdale Section of their Railway, and Deviations from the Line of the North Tyne Section of their Railway, and to raise further Capital; and for other Purposes.
South Western Railway Act 1859	22 & 23 Vict. c. xliv	1 August 1859
An Act for authorizing the London and South-western Railway Company to make new Works, and to raise further Funds; and for other Purposes.
Sevenoaks Railway Act 1859	22 & 23 Vict. c. xlv	1 August 1859
An Act for making a Railway to Sevenoaks, and for other Purposes connected therewith.
Witney Railway Act 1859	22 & 23 Vict. c. xlvi	1 August 1859
An Act for connecting the Town of Witney with the existing Railways in the Parishes of Yarnton and Wolvercot in the County of Oxford, and for other Purposes.
Swansea Harbour Act 1859	22 & 23 Vict. c. xlvii	1 August 1859
An Act to extend the Period limited by "The Swansea Harbour Act, 1854," (Note: Swansea Harbour Act 1854 (17 & 18 Vict. c. cxxvi)) for the Construction and Completion of the Works thereby authorized.
Great Northern and Western (of Ireland) Railway Act 1859	22 & 23 Vict. c. xlviii	1 August 1859
An Act to enable the Great Northern and Western (of Ireland) Railway Company to extend their Railway to Castlebar; and for other Purposes.
Scottish National Insurance Company's Incorporation Act 1859 (repealed)	22 & 23 Vict. c. xlix	1 August 1859
An Act for incorporating the National Fire and Life Insurance Company of Scotland by the Name of "The Scottish National Insurance Company;" for enabling the Company to sue and be sued, and to take and hold Property; and for other Purposes relating to the Company. (Repealed by Statute Law (Repeals) Act 1998 (c. 43))
Lough Swilly Railway (Deviation) Act 1859	22 & 23 Vict. c. l	1 August 1859
An Act to confer further Powers on the Londonderry and Lough Swilly Railway Company for the Completion of their Railway.
Dundalk and Enniskillen Railway Act 1859	22 & 23 Vict. c. li	1 August 1859
An Act to enable the Dundalk and Enniskillen Railway Company to make new Lines of Railway to Cavan and Belturbet; and for other Purposes.
City of London Gas Company's Act 1859	22 & 23 Vict. c. lii	1 August 1859
An Act to regulate the Capital and Undertaking of "The City of London Gaslight and Coke Company," and to reincorporate that Company.
Midland Great Western Railway of Ireland (Liffey Branch) Act 1859 (repealed)	22 & 23 Vict. c. liii	1 August 1859
An Act to enable the Midland Great Western Railway of Ireland Company to construct a Branch Railway to the River Liffey; and for other Purposes. (Repealed by Statute Law (Repeals) Act 2013 (c. 2))
London, Chatham and Dover Railway Act 1859	22 & 23 Vict. c. liv	1 August 1859
An Act to change the Name of the East Kent Railway Company, and for other Purposes connected with their Undertaking.
Mountsorrel Railway Act 1859	22 & 23 Vict. c. lv	1 August 1859
An Act for making a Railway from the Midland Railway to or near the Town of Mountsorrel in the County of Leicester.
Somerset Central Railway (Narrow Gauge) Act 1859	22 & 23 Vict. c. lvi	1 August 1859
An Act for authorizing the Somerset Central Railway Company to lay down Narrow Gauge Lines of Rails on their Railways, and to raise further Funds; and for regulating their Capital and Borrowing Powers; and for other Purposes.
Wear Navigation and Sunderland Dock Act 1859 (repealed)	22 & 23 Vict. c. lvii	1 August 1859
An Act for vesting the Sunderland Docks in the Commissioners of the River Wear; for enabling the Commissioners to execute certain Works; for amending the Provisions of the Acts relating to the Docks and River; and for other Purposes. (Repealed by Wear Navigation and Sunderland Dock (Consolidation and Amendment) Act 1922 (12 & 13 Geo. 5. c. lxxxiv))
Wirral Waterworks Act 1859	22 & 23 Vict. c. lviii	1 August 1859
An Act for better supplying with Water Parts of the Parishes of Bebbington and Woodchurch in the County of Chester; and for other Purposes.
Merthyr, Tredegar and Abergavenny Railway Act 1859	22 & 23 Vict. c. lix	1 August 1859
An Act to incorporate a Company for making Railways to supply Communication to the District between Merthyr and Abergavenny, and for other Purposes.
Portsmouth Docks Act 1859	22 & 23 Vict. c. lx	1 August 1859
An Act for making a Dock with other Conveniences in the Camber at Portsmouth, and for other Purposes.
Tottenham and Edmonton Gas Act 1859	22 & 23 Vict. c. lxi	1 August 1859
An Act for incorporating "The Tottenham and Edmonton Gaslight and Coke Company," and extending their Powers; and for other Purposes.
Midland Great Western Railway of Ireland (Sligo Extension) Act 1859 (repealed)	22 & 23 Vict. c. lxii	1 August 1859
An Act to enable the Midland Great Western Railway of Ireland Company to abandon a Portion of their authorized Line between Longford and Boyle, and to construct a new Line in substitution therefor; and for other Purposes. (Repealed by Statute Law (Repeals) Act 2013 (c. 2))
Mid-Wales Railway Act 1859	22 & 23 Vict. c. lxiii	1 August 1859
An Act for making a Railway from Llanidloes in the County of Montgomery to Newbridge in the County of Radnor, to be called "The Mid-Wales Railway," and for other Purposes.
Vale of Llangollen Railway Act 1859	22 & 23 Vict. c. lxiv	1 August 1859
An Act for making a Railway from the Shrewsbury and Chester Section of the Great Western Railway near Ruabon in the County of Denbigh to the Town of Llangollen in the same County, and for other Purposes.
Stokes Bay Railway and Pier Act 1859	22 & 23 Vict. c. lxv	1 August 1859
An Act to enable the Stokes Bay Railway and Pier Company to raise additional Capital.
Droitwich Roads Act 1859 (repealed)	22 & 23 Vict. c. lxvi	1 August 1859
An Act to repeal an Act passed in the Fifth Year of the Reign of His Majesty King George the Fourth, intituled "An Act for widening, improving, and maintaining the Turnpike Road leading from the City of Worcester, through Droitwich, to Spadesbourne Bridge within the Parish of Bromsgrove in the County of Worcester, and other Roads therein mentioned;" (Note: Road from Worcester through Droitwich to Bromsgrove Act 1824 (5 Geo. 4. c. xxxiii)) and for granting more effectual Powers in lieu thereof. (Repealed by Annual Turnpike Acts Continuance Act 1877 (40 & 41 Vict. c. 64))
Hinckley and Melbourne Roads Act 1859 (repealed)	22 & 23 Vict. c. lxvii	1 August 1859
An Act to repeal an Act passed in the Tenth Year of the Reign of His Majesty King George the Fourth, intituled "An Act for repairing the Road from Hinckley to Melbourne Common, and other Roads communicating there with, in the Counties of Leicester and Derby;" (Note: Road from Hinckley to Melbourne Common (Derbyshire) Act 1828 (9 Geo. 4. c. v)) and granting more effectual Powers in lieu thereof. (Repealed by Annual Turnpike Acts Continuance Act 1878 (41 & 42 Vict. c. 62))
Brecon and Merthyr Junction Railway Act 1859	22 & 23 Vict. c. lxviii	1 August 1859
An Act for making Railways in the District between Brecon and Merthyr Tydfil, and for other Purposes.
London, Brighton and South Coast Railway Act 1859	22 & 23 Vict. c. lxix	1 August 1859
An Act to enable the London, Brighton, and South Coast Railway Company to make certain Alterations in their existing and authorized Railways; to make anew Railway at Norwood; to acquire additional Lands for Station Accommodation, and to purchase or take on Lease other Undertakings; and for other Purposes.
Tweed Fisheries Amendment Act 1859 or the Tweed Fisheries Act 1859 (repealed)	22 & 23 Vict. c. lxx	1 August 1859
An Act to amend "The Tweed Fisheries Act 1857," (Note: Tweed Fisheries Act 1857 (20 & 21 Vict. c. cxlviii)) and to alter the Annual Close Times in the River Tweed. (Repealed by Scotland Act 1998 (River Tweed) Order 2006 (SI 2006/2913))
Bradford, Wakefield and Leeds Railway Act 1859	22 & 23 Vict. c. lxxi	1 August 1859
An Act to authorize the Bradford, Wakefield, and Leeds Railway Company to raise a further Sum of Money; and for other Purposes.
Ipswich Fishery Act 1859	22 & 23 Vict. c. lxxii	1 August 1859
An Act for the Regulation and Improvement of the Oyster Fishery in the River Orwell within the Borough of Ipswich.
South Durham and Lancashire Union Railway Deviation Act 1859	22 & 23 Vict. c. lxxiii	1 August 1859
An Act to enable the South Durham and Lancashire Union Railway Company to deviate their authorized line of Railway, to carry their Line over a certain Road by a level Crossing, and to construct a Road for providing better Access to the Railway at or near to Barnard Castle; and for other Purposes.
Birkenhead Railway Act 1859	22 & 23 Vict. c. lxxiv	1 August 1859
An Act to authorize the Birkenhead, Lancashire, and Cheshire Junction Railway Company to make a Railway from Hooton to Helsby, with a Branch to Tranmere Pool; and for other Purposes.
Bray Commons Inclosure Act 1859	22 & 23 Vict. c. lxxv	8 August 1859
An Act for inclosing the Commons or Waste Lands called "The Commons of Bray" in the Parish of Old Connaught in the County of Dublin.
Oxford, Worcester and Wolverhampton Railway Act 1859	22 & 23 Vict. c. lxxvi	8 August 1859
An Act to authorize the Oxford, Worcester, and Wolverhampton Railway Company to extend their Kingswinford Branch, and to alter certain Parts of their Main Line of Railway, and to carry into effect an Agreement with the Great Western Railway Company for the Completion of the Main Line on the Narrow Gauge only; and for other Purposes.
Swanage Pier Act 1859	22 & 23 Vict. c. lxxvii	8 August 1859
An Act for making a Pier in Swanage Bay in the County of Dorset, and a Tramway in connexion therewith; and for other Purposes.
Llanrwst and Abergele Road Act 1859	22 & 23 Vict. c. lxxviii	8 August 1859
An Act for making a Road from Llanrwst to Abergele, and a Branch Road thereout, in the Counties of Denbigh and Caernarvon.
Great North Road Act 1859	22 & 23 Vict. c. lxxix	8 August 1859
An Act for continuing an Act (Note: Roads from North Queensferry to Perth Act 1829 (10 Geo. 4. c. lxi)) for more effectually making, amending, widening, repairing, and maintaining the Great North Roads leading from the North Queensferry and from Burntisland, both in the County of Fife, by Kinross, to the City of Perth, and for enabling the Trustees of the said Roads and the Trustees of other Roads to enter into mutual Arrangements.
Dublin and Wicklow Railway (Gorey Extension) Act 1859	22 & 23 Vict. c. lxxx	8 August 1859
An Act to enable the Dublin and Wicklow Railway Company to extend their Railway to Gorey in the County of Wexford; and for other Purposes.
Charing Cross Railway Act 1859	22 & 23 Vict. c. lxxxi	8 August 1859
An Act for the making and maintaining of the Charing Cross Railway, and for other Purposes.
Lands Improvement Company's Amendment Act 1859	22 & 23 Vict. c. lxxxii	8 August 1859
An Act to alter and amend the Acts relating to the Lands Improvement Company.
Scottish Central Railway Consolidation Act 1859	22 & 23 Vict. c. lxxxiii	8 August 1859
An Act to consolidate and amend the Acts relating to the Scottish Central Railway.
Hereford, Hay and Brecon Railway Act 1859	22 & 23 Vict. c. lxxxiv	8 August 1859
An Act for making a Railway from Brecon through Hay to the Line of the Shrewsbury and Hereford Railway Company at Hereford.
Wansbeck Railway Act 1859	22 & 23 Vict. c. lxxxv	8 August 1859
An Act for the making and maintaining of the Wansbeck Railway from Morpeth to a Junction with the North Tyne Section of the Border Counties Railway, and with Branches to the Morpeth Branch of the Blyth and Tyne Railway and the Main Line of the North-eastern Railway respectively; and for other Purposes.
Hunslet and Leeds Turnpike Road Act 1859	22 & 23 Vict. c. lxxxvi	8 August 1859
An Act to repeal an Act of the Ninth Year of the Reign of King George the Fourth, (Note: Road from Hunslet to Leeds Act 1828 (9 Geo. 4. c. lxvii)) for making a Turnpike Road from the Township of Hunslet across the River Aire to the Township of Leeds, and to make other Provisions in lieu thereof.
Lawton, Burslem and Newcastle-under-Lyme Turnpike Roads Act 1859 (repealed)	22 & 23 Vict. c. lxxxvii	8 August 1859
An Act to repeal the Acts relating to the Lawton, Burslemn and Newcastle-under-Lyme Turnpike Roads, and to consolidate and amend the Provisions thereof. (Repealed by Annual Turnpike Acts Continuance Act 1878 (41 & 42 Vict. c. 62))
London and North Western Railway (Sutton Coldfield Branch) Act 1859	22 & 23 Vict. c. lxxxviii	8 August 1859
An Act for making a Railway from the London and North-western Railway to Sutton Coldfield in the County of Warwick, with a Branch therefrom; and for other Purposes.
Ludlow Turnpike Roads Act 1859 (repealed)	22 & 23 Vict. c. lxxxix	8 August 1859
An Act for repairing and maintaining certain Roads at and near Ludlow in the County of Salop, known as the Ludlow First Turnpike Trust, the Ludlow Second Turnpike Trust, and the Cainham Trust, and for placing such Roads under the same Management. (Repealed by Annual Turnpike Acts Continuance Act 1872 (35 & 36 Vict. c. 85))
Sittingbourne and Sheerness Railway (Increase of Capital) Act 1859	22 & 23 Vict. c. xc	8 August 1859
An Act to enable the Sittingbourne and Sheerness Railway Company to raise additional Capital, to amend the Acts relating to the Company, and for other Purposes.
North Eastern Railway (Bedale and Leyburn and Rosedale Railways Amalgamation) Act 1859	22 & 23 Vict. c. xci	8 August 1859
An Act for amalgamating the Bedale and Leyburn Railway Company with the North-eastern Railway Company, and for vesting in the latter the Undertaking of the former Company and the Rosedale Branch and Property of the North Yorkshire and Cleveland Railway Company; and for other Purposes.
Finford Bridge and Banbury Turnpike Road Act 1859 (repealed)	22 & 23 Vict. c. xcii	8 August 1859
An Act to renew the Term and continue, amend, and enlarge the Powers of an Act passed in the Third Year of the reign of His Majesty King George the Fourth, intituled "An Act for more effectually repairing the Road leading from the Cross of Hand near Finford Bridge in the County of Warwick, through the Town of Southam in the same County, to the Borough of Banbury in the County of Oxford," (Note: Road from Finford Bridge to Banbury Act 1822 (3 Geo. 4. c. xcv)) and to make other Provisions in lieu thereof; and for other Purposes. (Repealed by Annual Turnpike Acts Continuance Act 1878 (41 & 42 Vict. c. 62))
Blackburn and Preston Turnpike Road and Bridge Act 1859	22 & 23 Vict. c. xciii	8 August 1859
An Act for continuing the Term and amending and extending the Provisions of the Act (Note: Blackburn and Preston Turnpike Road Act 1852 (15 & 16 Vict. c. cxix)) relating to the Blackburn and Preston Turnpike Road, and for constructing a Bridge over the River Ribble in connexion therewith; and for other Purposes.
Cowes and Newport (Isle of Wight) Railway Act 1859	22 & 23 Vict. c. xciv	8 August 1859
An Act for making a Railway from West Cowes to Newport in the Isle of Wight, and for other Purposes.
Ringwood, Christchurch and Bournemouth Railway Act 1859	22 & 23 Vict. c. xcv	8 August 1859
An Act for making a Railway from the London and South-western Railway in the Parish of Ringwood to Christchurch, and an Approach Road at Christchurch, all in the County of Southampton; and for other Purposes.
Charleston Railway and Harbour Act 1859	22 & 23 Vict. c. xcvi	8 August 1859
An Act to authorize the Charleston Railway and Harbour Company to purchase and acquire the Charleston Railway and Harbour, and to extend and improve the said Railway and Harbour.
Metropolitan Railway Act 1859	22 & 23 Vict. c. xcvii	8 August 1859
An Act to alter, amend, and enlarge the Provisions of the Acts relating to the Metropolitan Railway, to authorize the Alteration and Relinquishment of certain of the Works, and to make further Provision with reference to the Construction of such Railway; and for other Purposes.
West London and Crystal Palace Railway (Extension of Time) Act 1859	22 & 23 Vict. c. xcviii	8 August 1859
An Act to extend the Powers of the West End of London and Crystal Palace Railway Company for the Purchase of Lands and Completion of their authorized Extension to Farnborough Railway, and for other Purposes.
Eastbourne Waterworks Act 1859	22 & 23 Vict. c. xcix	8 August 1859
An Act for better supplying with Water the Town of Eastbourne and Places adjacent thereto in the County of Sussex, and for other Purposes.
North Eastern Railway (Harrogate Branches) Act 1859	22 & 23 Vict. c. c	8 August 1859
An Act to enable the North-eastern Railway Company to construct Branch Railways for the Purpose of uniting their Leeds and Thirsk and Church Fenton and Harrowgate Railways, and for other Purposes.
South Yorkshire Railway and River Dun Company's Act 1859	22 & 23 Vict. c. ci	8 August 1859
An Act to amend the Acts relating to the South Yorkshire Railway and River Dun Company, and to regulate the crossing of certain Roads by the Railway of the Company.
Bombay, Baroda and Central India Railway Act 1859 (repealed)	22 & 23 Vict. c. cii	13 August 1859
An Act for regulating the Bombay, Baroda, and Central India Railway Company, and for making Provision with respect to the Capital of the Company; and for other Purposes. (Repealed by Bombay, Baroda and Central India Railway Act 1906 (6 Edw. 7. c. lix))
Newcastle-under-Lyme Burgesses' Lands Act 1859	22 & 23 Vict. c. ciii	13 August 1859
An Act to make better Provision for the Management and Application of the Newcastle-under-Lyme Burgesses Lands, to repeal and amend the Act (Note: Newcastle-under-Lyme, &c. Inclosure Act 1816 (56 Geo. 3. c. 33 Pr.)) relating thereto, and for other Purposes.
Nuneaton and Hinckley Railway Act 1859	22 & 23 Vict. c. civ	13 August 1859
An Act for making a Railway from the Trent Valley Railway at Nuneaton in the County of Warwick to Hinckley in the County of Leicester, and for other Purposes.
Berks and Hants Extension Railway Act 1859	22 & 23 Vict. c. cv	13 August 1859
An Act to authorize the Construction of a Railway from Hungerford in Berkshire to Devizes in Wiltshire, to be called "The Berks and Hants Extension Railway."
British and Canadian Telegraph (Northern Line) Act 1859	22 & 23 Vict. c. cvi	13 August 1859
An Act for incorporating the British and Canadian Telegraph Company, and for other Purposes.
Chichester Harbour Embankment Act 1859	22 & 23 Vict. c. cvii	13 August 1859
An Act to embank and reclaim from the Sea certain Waste Lands subject to be overflowed by the Tide, and forming Part of Chichester Harbour in the County of Sussex.
Malltraeth and Corsddaugau Marsh Act 1859	22 & 23 Vict. c. cviii	13 August 1859
An Act to alter, amend, and extend the Acts for inclosing, embanking, and draining the Marsh called Malltraeth and Corsddaugau in the County of Anglesey, and to provide for the Maintenance of the Embankments and Drainage, and for other Purposes.
South Staffordshire Railway Act 1859	22 & 23 Vict. c. cix	13 August 1859
An Act to authorize the South Staffordshire Railway Company to acquire certain Lands and raise additional Capital; and for other Purposes.
Lancashire and Yorkshire and East Lancashire Railways Amalgamation Act 1859	22 & 23 Vict. c. cx	13 August 1859
An Act for the Amalgamation of the East Lancashire Railway Company with the Lancashire and Yorkshire Railway Company, and for other Purposes.
Leeds, Bradford and Halifax Junction Railway Act 1859	22 & 23 Vict. c. cxi	13 August 1859
An Act to authorize the Leeds, Bradford, and Halifax Junction Railway Company to convert their Mortgage or Bond Debt into Shares or Stock; and for other Purposes.
Victoria Station and Pimlico Railway Act 1859	22 & 23 Vict. c. cxii	13 August 1859
An Act to enable the Victoria Station and Pimlico Railway Company to raise further Sums of Money.
London and North Western Railway (New Works) Act 1859	22 & 23 Vict. c. cxiii	13 August 1859
An Act for enabling the London and North-western Railway Company to construct new Works and acquire additional Lands in the Counties of Lancaster and Northampton; and for other Purposes.
Silverdale and Newcastle Railway Act 1859	22 & 23 Vict. c. cxiv	13 August 1859
An Act to authorize the Maintenance and Use of the Silverdale and Newcastle-under-Lyme Railway, and the Use of the Extension Railway to the Newcastle-under-Lyme Canal, and for other Purposes.
Waveney Valley Railway Act 1859 (repealed)	22 & 23 Vict. c. cxv	13 August 1859
An Act to enable the Waveney Valley Railway Company to extend their Railway from Harleston to Bungay and Ditchingham; and for other Purposes relating to the same Company. (Repealed by Great Eastern Railway (Additional Powers) Act 1863 (26 & 27 Vict. c. cxc))
Margate Railway Act 1859	22 & 23 Vict. c. cxvi	13 August 1859
An Act to enable the Herne Bay and Faversham Railway Company to extend their Railway to Margate, to change their Name; and for other Purposes connected with their Undertaking.
Epping Railways Act 1859	22 & 23 Vict. c. cxvii	13 August 1859
An Act for establishing Railway Communication between Loughton, Epping, and Chipping Ongar in the County of Essex, and tor other Purposes.
Norwich and Spalding Railway Act 1859	22 & 23 Vict. c. cxviii	13 August 1859
An Act to enable the Norwich and Spalding Railway Company to extend their Railway from Holbeach to Sutton Bridge in Lincolnshire.
Tendring Hundred Railway Act 1859	22 & 23 Vict. c. cxix	13 August 1859
An Act to authorize the Construction of a Railway from the Hythe in the Neighbourhood of Colchester to Wivenhoe in Essex, to be called "The Tendring Hundred Railway."
Bridport Railway Act 1859	22 & 23 Vict. c. cxx	13 August 1859
An Act to afford Facilities for raising Funds for the Completion of the Bridport Railway, and to authorize the Lease thereof to the Great Western Railway Company.
Central Wales Railway Act 1859	22 & 23 Vict. c. cxxi	13 August 1859
An Act for making a Railway from Knighton to Llandrindod in the County of Radnor, to be called "The Central Wales Railway," and for other Purposes.
Colne Valley and Halstead Railway (Extension) Act 1859	22 & 23 Vict. c. cxxii	13 August 1859
An Act to enable the Colne Valley and Halstead Railway Company to extend their Railway from Halstead to Haverhill in the County of Essex.
Falkirk Police and Improvement Act 1859	22 & 23 Vict. c. cxxiii	13 August 1859
An Act for improving, paving, draining, and lighting the Burgh of Falkirk, and for regulating the Supply of Water within the Burgh; and for providing for the Transference of the Property of the Stintmasters and Feuars of Falkirk to the Magistrates and Council; and for other Purposes.
Lancaster and Carlisle Railway Act 1859	22 & 23 Vict. c. cxxiv	13 August 1859
An Act for authorizing the Lancaster and Carlisle Railway Company to make new Works, and to make Arrangements with other Companies, and to raise further Funds; and for other Purposes.
Mid Sussex and Midhurst Junction Railway Act 1859	22 & 23 Vict. c. cxxv	13 August 1859
An Act for making a Railway from the Coultershaw Branch of the Mid-Sussex Railway to the Town of Midhurst in the County of Sussex.
North Staffordshire Railway Act 1859	22 & 23 Vict. c. cxxvi	13 August 1859
An Act for making a Branch from the North Staffordshire Railway in the Parish of Stoke-upon-Trent in the County of Stafford, and for extending the Time for completing certain Works, and for authorizing Arrangements with the London and North-western Railway Company; and for other Purposes.
Stockton and Darlington Railway Act 1859	22 & 23 Vict. c. cxxvii	13 August 1859
An Act for enabling the Stockton and Darlington Railway Company to make a new Railway and other Works; and for other Purposes.
Kensington Station and North and South London Junction Railway Act 1859 (repealed)	22 & 23 Vict. c. cxxviii	13 August 1859
An Act for making the Kensington Station and North and South London Junction Railway, and for other Purposes. (Repealed by Statute Law (Repeals) Act 2013 (c. 2))
Lancashire and Yorkshire Railway (Rochdale and Royton Branches) Act 1859	22 & 23 Vict. c. cxxix	13 August 1859
An Act to enable the Lancashire and Yorkshire Railway Company to construct Branch Railways from Oldham to Rochdale and Royton in the County of Lancaster; and for other Purposes.
Midland Railway (Erewash Valley) Act 1859	22 & 23 Vict. c. cxxx	13 August 1859
An Act for enabling the Midland Railway Company to make an Extension of their Erewash Valley Line, to acquire additional Lands in the County of Leicester; and for other Purposes.
Londonderry and Coleraine Railway Arrangements Act 1859	22 & 23 Vict. c. cxxxi	13 August 1859
An Act to facilitate Arrangements by the Londonderry and Coleraine Railway Company with their Creditors, and for other Purposes.
Liverpool Sanitary Amendment Act 1859	22 & 23 Vict. c. cxxxii	13 August 1859
An Act to suspend in certain Cases the Operation of the Twenty-eighth Section of the "Liverpool Sanitary Amendment Act, 1854," (Note: Liverpool Sanitary Amendment Act 1854 (17 & 18 Vict. c. xv)) and for other Purposes.
Watermen's and Lightermen's Amendment Act 1859	22 & 23 Vict. c. cxxxiii	13 August 1859
An Act for the better Regulation of Watermen, Barge Owners, and others connected with the Navigation of the River Thames between Teddington Lock and Lower Hope Point.
West London Extension Railway Act 1859	22 & 23 Vict. c. cxxxiv	13 August 1859
An Act for the making and maintaining of the West London Extension Railway, and for other Purposes.
Tacumshin Embankment Act 1859	22 & 23 Vict. c. cxxxv	13 August 1859
An Act to amend "The Tacumshin Embankment Act, 1854," (Note: Tacumshin Embankment Act 1854 (17 & 18 Vict. c. cvi)) and to extend the Time for the Completion of the Works authorized by that Act.
Midland Railway and Burton-upon-Trent Bridge Act 1859	22 & 23 Vict. c. cxxxvi	13 August 1859
An Act for making and maintaining in and near to Burton-upon-Trent of Branch Railways from the Midland Railway, and the building of a new Bridge across the River Trent at Burton-upon-Trent, and the taking down and removing of "The Great Bridge at Burton-upon-Trent" and for other Purposes.
Pneumatic Dispatch Company's Act 1859	22 & 23 Vict. c. cxxxvii	13 August 1859
An Act to confer certain Powers upon "The Pneumatic Despatch Company (Limited)."
Warrington and Stockport Railway Leasing Act 1859	22 & 23 Vict. c. cxxxviii	13 August 1859
An Act to transfer the Warrington and Stockport Railway to certain Companies.
Wells and Fakenham Railway Act 1859	22 & 23 Vict. c. cxxxix	13 August 1859
An Act to extend the Wells and Fakenham Railway to and along Wells Quays, and for other Purposes.

=== Private acts ===
Short title	Citation	Royal assent
Long title
Earl of Kintore's Estate Act 1859	22 & 23 Vict. c. 1 Pr.	8 August 1859
An Act to authorize the Exchange of certain detached Portions situate in the County of Forfar of the entailed Estate of Haulkertoun for the Lands of Balbithan and Wester Fintray in the County of Aberdeen to be entailed in lieu thereof; and for other Purposes.
Earl Vane's Estate Act 1859	22 & 23 Vict. c. 2 Pr.	8 August 1859
An Act for authorizing the Trustees of the Settled Estates in Wales of Earl Vane and Countess Vane to raise Five thousand Pounds by Mortgage of the same Estates, and to become Shareholders to the Extent of such Sum in the Newtown and Machynlleth Railway Company, and to sell to the Company Part of the Settled Estates in consideration of a yearly Rentcharge; and for other Purposes.
Lucette's Estate Act 1859	22 & 23 Vict. c. 3 Pr.	8 August 1859
An Act for confirming and giving effect to an Agreement for a Lease by the Westminster Improvement Commissioners of Land in Victoria Street and Dean Street in the Cit of Westminster to Alfred Lucette, of which the Short Title is "Lucette's Estate Act, 1859."
Ramsden's Estate (Leasing) Act 1859 (repealed)	22 & 23 Vict. c. 4 Pr.	13 August 1859
An Act for authorizing Leases of Parts of the Settled Estates, in the Parishes of Huddersfield, Almondbury, and Kirkheaton, in the West Riding of the County of York, of Sir John William Ramsden Baronet, and of which the Short Title is "Ramsden's Estate (Leasing) Act, 1859." (Repealed by West Yorkshire Act 1980 (c. xiv))
Robins' Estate Act 1859	22 & 23 Vict. c. 5 Pr.	13 August 1859
An Act for effecting a Partition of the Landed Estates of Josiah Robins deceased in and near to Birmingham and elsewhere, and for facilitating the Erection and Endowment of a Church thereon, and for authorizing the Application of Moneys, subject to the Trusts of his Will, towards the Expenses of making Bridges for the Benefit of Parts of his Estates; and for other Purposes.
William Sandwith's Divorce Act 1859 (Note: This act was not printed by the Queen's Printer.)	22 & 23 Vict. c. 6 Pr.	21 July 1859
An Act to dissolve the Marriage of William Sandwith Esquire with Georgina Mary his now Wife, and to enable him to marry again; and for other Purposes.
James Dickinson's Divorce Act 1859	22 & 23 Vict. c. 7 Pr.	13 August 1859
An Act to dissolve the Marriage of James Edward Dickinson, a Surgeon in the Honourable East India Company's Service in the East Indies, with Henrietta Louisa his now Wife, and to enable him to marry again; and for other Purposes therein mentioned.

=== Sources ===
- A Collection of the Public General Statutes Passed in the Twenty-Second and Twenty-Third Years of the Reign of Her Majesty Queen Victoria. London: Eyre & Spottiswoode. 1859 – via Google Books.
- A Compendious Abstract of the Public General Acts of the United Kingdom of Great Britain and Ireland: 22 & 23 Victoriæ, 1859. London: E. B. Ince. 1859 – via Google Books.
- Richards, George Kettilby (1859). The Statutes of the United Kingdom of Great Britain and Ireland, 22 & 23 Victoria, 1859. London: Eyre & Spottiswoode – via Internet Archive.
- Journals of the House of Commons (PDF). Vol. 114.

== See also ==
- List of acts of the Parliament of the United Kingdom
