= Industrial and Provident Societies Act 1862 =

Act of the Parliament of the United Kingdom

Industrial and Provident Societies Act 1862 (Note: Section 26.)
- Act of Parliament
- Parliament of the United Kingdom
- Long title: An Act to consolidate and amend the Law relating to Industrial and Provident Societies.
- Citation: 25 & 26 Vict. c. 87
- Introduced by: T. H. S. Sotheron-Estcourt MP (Commons)
- Territorial extent: United Kingdom (Note: Section 2.)

Dates
- Royal assent: 7 August 1862
- Commencement: 7 August 1862 (Note: The Acts of Parliament (Commencement) Act 1793.)
- Repealed: 11 August 1876
Other legislation
Repeals/revokes	Industrial and Provident Societies Act 1852; Industrial and Provident Societies Act 1854; Industrial and Provident Societies Act 1856
Amended by	Industrial and Provident Societies Act 1867; Industrial and Provident Societies Act 1871
Repealed by	Industrial and Provident Societies Act 1876
Relates to	Industrial and Provident Societies Act 1852; Industrial and Provident Societies Act 1876; Industrial and Provident Societies Act 1893; Industrial and Provident Societies Act 1965

Status: Repealed

History of passage through Parliament

Records of Parliamentary debate relating to the statute from Hansard

Text of statute as originally enacted

The Industrial and Provident Societies Act 1862 (25 & 26 Vict. c. 87) was an act of the Parliament of the United Kingdom that consolidated and amended the law relating to industrial and provident societies.

== Background ==
The first legislation basis for industrial and provident societies was provided for by the Industrial and Provident Societies Partnership Act 1852 (15 & 16 Vict. c. 31). This legislation was subsequently amended by the Industrial and Provident Societies Act 1854 (17 & 18 Vict. c. 25) and the Industrial and Provident Societies Act 1856 (19 & 20 Vict. c. 40) to improve legal proceedings concerning societies formed under the act.

== Passage ==
Leave to bring in the Industrial and Provident Societies Bill to the House of Commons was granted to T. H. S. Sotheron-Estcourt MP and Robert Aglionby Slaney MP on 1 April 1862. The bill had its first reading in the House of Commons on 1 April 1862, presented by T. H. S. Sotheron-Estcourt MP. The bill had its second reading in the House of Commons on 30 April 1862 and was committed to a committee of the whole house, which met and reported on 30 May 1862, with amendments. The amended bill was re-committed to a committee of the whole house, which met and reported on 14 June 1862, with amendments. The amended bill was considered on 21 June 1862, with amendments and had its third reading in the House of Commons on 24 June 1862 and passed, without amendments.

The bill had its first reading in the House of Lords on 26 June 1862. The bill had its second reading in the House of Lords on 15 July 1862 and was committed to a committee of the whole house, which met and reported on 18 July 1862, with amendments. The amended bill had its third reading in the House of Lords on 22 July 1862 and passed, with amendments.

The amended bill was considered and agreed to by the House of Commons on 29 July 1862.

The bill was granted royal assent on 7 August 1862.

== Provisions ==
=== Repealed acts ===
Section 1 of the act repealed 3 enactments, listed in the preamble to the act.

Citation	Short title	Extent of repeal
15 & 16 Vict. c. 31	Industrial and Provident Societies Partnership Act 1852	The whole act.
17 & 18 Vict. c. 25	Industrial and Provident Societies Act 1854	The whole act.
19 & 20 Vict. c. 40	Industrial and Provident Societies Act 1856	The whole act.

Section 2 of the act provided that all societies incorporated under the Industrial and Provident Societies Partnership Act 1852 (15 & 16 Vict. c. 31) would be able to obtain a new certificate of incorporation from the Registrar of Friendly Societies without a fee.

== Subsequent developments ==
The whole act was repealed by section 4 of, and the first schedule to, the Industrial and Provident Societies Act 1876 (39 & 40 Vict. c. 45), which came into force on 11 August 1876.
