= Income Tax Act 1918 =

Act of the Parliament of the United Kingdom

Income Tax Act 1918 (Note: Section 239(1).)
- Act of Parliament
- Parliament of the United Kingdom
- Long title: An Act to Consolidate the Enactments relating to Income Tax.
- Citation: 8 & 9 Geo. 5. c. 40
- Territorial extent: United Kingdom

Dates
- Royal assent: 8 August 1918
- Commencement: 6 April 1919 (Note: Section 239(2).)
- Repealed: 6 April 1952
Other legislation
Amends	See § Repealed enactments
Repeals/revokes	See § Repealed enactments
Amended by	False Oaths (Scotland) Act 1933; Administration of Justice (Miscellaneous Provisions) Act 1933
Repealed by	Income Tax Act 1952

Status: Repealed

Text of statute as originally enacted

The Income Tax Act 1918 (8 & 9 Geo. 5. c. 40) was an act of the Parliament of the United Kingdom that consolidated enactments relating to income tax in the United Kingdom.

== Provisions ==
=== Repealed enactments ===
Section 238 of the act repealed 52 enactments, listed in the seventh schedule to the act.

Citation	Short title	Extent of repeal
5 & 6 Vict. c. 35	Income Tax Act 1842	The whole act.
5 & 6 Vict. c. 37	Land Tax Act 1842	Sections three, four and five, so far as they relate to income tax.
5 & 6 Vict. c. 80	Income Tax (Foreign Dividends) Act 1842	The whole act.
16 & 17 Vict. c. 34	Income Tax Act 1853	The whole act.
16 & 17 Vict. c. 91	Income Tax (Insurance) Act 1853	The whole act.
17 & 18 Vict. c. 24	Income Tax Act 1854	The whole act.
18 & 19 Vict. c. 35	Income Tax (Insurance) Act 1855	The whole act.
19 & 20 Vict. c. 80	Taxes Act 1856	The whole act.
22 & 23 Vict. c. 18	Income Tax Act 1859	The whole act.
23 & 24 Vict. c. 14	Income Tax Act 1860	The whole act.
24 & 25 Vict. c. 91	Revenue (No. 2) Act 1861	Section thirty-six.
26 & 27 Vict. c. 33	Revenue Act 1863	Section twenty-two.
27 & 28 Vict. c. 18	Revenue (No. 1) Act 1864	Section fifteen.
29 & 30 Vict. c. 36	Revenue Act 1866	The whole act.
31 & 32 Vict. c. 28	Revenue Act 1868	The whole act.
35 & 36 Vict. c. 82	Income Tax (Public Offices) Act 1872	The whole act.
39 & 40 Vict. c. 16	Customs and Inland Revenue Act 1876	Section eight.
41 & 42 Vict. c. 15	Customs and Inland Revenue Act 1878	Section twelve. Section sixteen so far as it relates to income tax.
42 & 43 Vict. c. 21	Customs and Inland Revenue Act 1879	Section eighteen.
43 & 44 Vict. c. 19	Taxes Management Act 1880	The whole act so far as it relates to income tax.
44 & 45 Vict. c. 12	Customs and Inland Revenue Act 1881	Section twenty-three so far as it relates to income tax.
46 & 47 Vict. c. 55	Revenue Act 1883	Section twelve so far as it relates to income tax.
47 & 48 Vict. c. 62	Revenue Act 1884	Sections six and seven so far as they relate to income tax.
48 & 49 Vict. c. 51	Customs and Inland Revenue Act 1885	Sections twenty-five and twenty-six.
50 & 51 Vict. c. 15	Customs and Inland Revenue Act 1887	Section eighteen.
51 & 52 Vict. c. 8	Customs and Inland Revenue Act 1888	Section twenty-four.
52 & 53 Vict. c. 42	Revenue Act 1889	Sections ten and twelve. Sections thirteen and fourteen so far as they relate to income tax.
53 & 54 Vict. c. 8	Customs and Inland Revenue Act 1890	Sections twenty-three, twenty-four and thirty. Sections twenty-seven and twenty-eight so far as they relate to income tax.
54 & 55 Vict. c. 13	Taxes (Regulation of Remuneration) Act 1891	The whole act so far as it relates to income tax.
56 & 57 Vict. c. 2	Trades Union (Provident Funds) Act 1893	The whole act.
56 & 57 Vict. c. 7	Customs and Inland Revenue Act 1893	Section seven.
56 & 57 Vict. c. 39	Industrial and Provident Societies Act 1893	Section twenty-four.
57 & 58 Vict. c. 30	Finance Act 1894	Sections thirty-four, thirty-five and thirty-six.
59 & 60 Vict. c. 28	Finance Act 1896	Sections twenty-six, twenty-seven and twenty-eight. Section thirty so far as it relates to income tax.
60 & 61 Vict. c. 24	Finance Act 1897	Section five.
61 & 62 Vict. c. 10	Finance Act 1898	Sections eight, nine, ten and eleven.
3 Edw. 7. c. 46	Revenue Act 1903	Sections ten and thirteen.
4 Edw. 7. c. 7	Finance Act 1904	Sections eight and nine.
6 Edw. 7. c. 20	Revenue Act 1906	Section eleven.
7 Edw. 7. c. 13	Finance Act 1907	Sections nineteen, twenty, twenty-one, twenty-two, twenty-three subsection (1), twenty-four, twenty-five, twenty-six, twenty-seven, and twenty-eight.
10 Edw. 7. c. 8	Finance (1909–10) Act 1910	Sections sixty-six, sixty-seven, sixty-eight, sixty-nine, seventy, seventy-one, and seventy-two.
1 Geo. 5. c. 2	Revenue Act 1911	Sections twelve, thirteen and fourteen.
2 & 3 Geo. 5. c. 8	Finance Act 1912	Sections six and seven.
3 & 4 Geo. 5. c. 30	Finance Act 1913	Section three.
4 & 5 Geo. 5. c. 10	Finance Act 1914	Sections three, four, five, seven, eight, nine, ten and eleven.
5 Geo. 5. c. 7	Finance Act 1914 (Session 2)	Section thirteen.
5 & 6 Geo. 5. c. 62	Finance Act 1915	Sections eleven, twelve, thirteen, fourteen, fifteen, sixteen, seventeen, eighteen, nineteen, twenty, twenty-one, twenty-two, twenty-three and twenty-eight subsection (1).
5 & 6 Geo. 5. c. 89	Finance (No. 2) Act 1915	Section twenty-one except subsection (5). Sections twenty-two, twenty-three, twenty-four, twenty-five, twenty-six, twenty-seven, twenty-eight, twenty-nine, thirty, thirty-one, thirty-two, thirty-three, thirty-four, thirty-five, thirty-six, and thirty-seven.
5 & 6 Geo. 5. c. 93	War Loan (Supplemental Provisions) Act 1915	Section three.
6 & 7 Geo. 5. c. 24	Finance Act 1916	Sections twenty-five, twenty-six, twenty-seven, twenty-eight, twenty-nine, thirty, thirty-one, thirty-two, thirty-three, thirty-four, thirty-five, thirty-six, thirty-seven, thirty-eight, thirty-nine, forty, forty-two, forty-three, forty-four except subsection (1), fifty-three and sixty-four.
7 & 8 Geo. 5. c. 31	Finance Act 1917	Sections eleven, twelve, thirteen, fourteen, fifteen, sixteen, seventeen, eighteen and nineteen.
8 & 9 Geo. 5. c. 15	Finance Act 1918	Subsection (2) of section eighteen; sections twenty-one, twenty-three, twenty-four, twenty-five, twenty-six, twenty-seven, twenty-eight, twenty-nine, thirty, thirty-one, and thirty-two, thirty-three so far as it relates to income tax, and forty; and in section forty-one the words from "and section forty-two" to "that section."

== Subsequent developments ==
The whole act was repealed by section 527(1) of, and part I of the twenty-fifth schedule to, the Income Tax Act 1952 (15 & 16 Geo. 6 & 1 Eliz. 2. c. 10), which came into force on 6 April 1952.
