= Industrial and Provident Societies Partnership Act 1852 =

Act of the Parliament of the United Kingdom

Industrial and Provident Societies Act 1852 (Note: Section 14.)
- Act of Parliament
- Parliament of the United Kingdom
- Long title: An Act to legalize the Formation of Industrial and Provident Societies.
- Citation: 15 & 16 Vict. c. 31
- Territorial extent: United Kingdom

Dates
- Royal assent: 30 June 1852
- Commencement: 30 June 1852 (Note: The Acts of Parliament (Commencement) Act 1793.)
- Repealed: 7 August 1862
Other legislation
Amended by	Industrial and Provident Societies Act 1854; Industrial and Provident Societies Act 1856
Repealed by	Industrial and Provident Societies Act 1862
Relates to	Industrial and Provident Societies Act 1862; Industrial and Provident Societies Act 1876; Industrial and Provident Societies Act 1893; Industrial and Provident Societies Act 1965

Status: Repealed

History of passage through Parliament

Records of Parliamentary debate relating to the statute from Hansard

Text of statute as originally enacted

The Industrial and Provident Societies Partnership Act 1852 (15 & 16 Vict. c. 31), also known (somewhat unjustifiably) as Slaney's Act, that provided the legislation basis for industrial and provident societies in the United Kingdom. The act was a significant legislative landmark in the establishment of the co-operative movement in the United Kingdom.

== Background ==
Prior to 1852, co-operative societies had protected their members capital by registering under the Friendly Societies Act 1846. However the act specified protection only for purchases, not for sales; so the co-operative societies were forced to use a legal fiction of dubious merit to cover themselves when selling, and it was this that brought home the need for a new statute to regularise their position.

== Passage ==
John Ludlow played an important role in promoting the act. He had initially proposed a comparable Bill for Whig passage in 1851; but was blocked by Henry Labouchere at the Board of Trade. The following year Disraeli persuaded his colleagues that promoting such social reform would be politically advantageous for the Tories, as well as offering a route for working-class energies to be incorporated into society; and the Bill passed into law.

The act not only provided a legal framework for the co-operative movement, but also specified much of its future direction - for example laying down the principle that up to one-third of profits could be shared among members, the rest being used to build up the business.

== Subsequent developments ==
The act was subsequently amended by the Industrial and Provident Societies Act 1854 (17 & 18 Vict. c. 25) and the Industrial and Provident Societies Act 1856 (19 & 20 Vict. c. 40) to improve legal proceedings concerning societies formed under the act.

The whole act was repealed by the Industrial and Provident Societies Act 1862 (25 & 26 Vict. c. 87), which came into force on 7 August 1862.

== See also ==
- Charles Kingsley
- Friendly society
- G. J. Holyoake
- Industrial and provident society
- Robert Aglionby Slaney
- Young England
