= Industrial and Provident Societies Act 1876 =

Act of the Parliament of the United Kingdom

Industrial and Provident Societies Act 1876 (Note: Section 1.)
- Act of Parliament
- Parliament of the United Kingdom
- Long title: An Act to consolidate and amend the Law relating to Industrial and Provident Societies.
- Citation: 39 & 40 Vict. c. 45
- Introduced by: Alexander Staveley Hill MP (Commons)
- Territorial extent: Great Britain; Ireland; Channel Islands; (Note: Section 2.)

Dates
- Royal assent: 11 August 1876
- Commencement: 11 August 1876 (Note: The Acts of Parliament (Commencement) Act 1793.)
- Repealed: 1 January 1894
Other legislation
Repeals/revokes	Industrial and Provident Societies Act 1862; Industrial and Provident Societies Act 1867; Industrial and Provident Societies Act 1871
Amended by	Statute Law Revision Act 1883; Summary Jurisdiction Act 1884; Friendly Society Act 1896
Repealed by	Industrial and Provident Societies Act 1893
Relates to	Industrial and Provident Societies Act 1852; Industrial and Provident Societies Act 1862; Industrial and Provident Societies Act 1893; Industrial and Provident Societies Act 1965

Status: Repealed

Text of statute as originally enacted

The Industrial and Provident Societies Act 1876 (39 & 40 Vict. c. 45) was an act of the Parliament of the United Kingdom that consolidated and amended the law relating to industrial and provident societies.

== Background ==
The first legislation basis for industrial and provident societies was provided for by the Industrial and Provident Societies Partnership Act 1852 (15 & 16 Vict. c. 31). This legislation was subsequently amended by the Industrial and Provident Societies Act 1854 (17 & 18 Vict. c. 25) and the Industrial and Provident Societies Act 1856 (19 & 20 Vict. c. 40) to improve legal proceedings concerning societies formed under the act.

Legislation relating to industrial and provident societies was subsequently amended and consolidated by the Industrial and Provident Societies Act 1862 (25 & 26 Vict. c. 87).

== Passage ==
Leave to bring in the Industrial and Provident Societies Bill to the House of Commons was granted to Alexander Staveley Hill MP, William Cowper-Temple MP and Benjamin Rodwell MP on 14 February 1876. The bill had its first reading in the House of Commons on 14 February 1876, presented by Alexander Staveley Hill MP. The bill had its second reading in the House of Commons on 23 February 1876 and was committed to a committee of the whole house, which met and reported on 29 May 1876, with amendments. The amended bill was re-committed to a committee of the whole house, which met on 10 May 1876 and reported on 13 May 1876, with amendments. The amended bill had its third reading in the House of Commons on 15 May 1876 and passed, without amendments.

The bill had its first reading in the House of Lords on 16 May 1876. The bill had its second reading in the House of Lords on 20 June 1876 and was committed to a committee of the whole house, which met on 27 June 1876 and reported on 3 July 1876, with amendments. The amended bill had its third reading in the House of Lords on 7 July 1876 and passed, with amendments.

The amended bill was considered and agreed to by the House of Commons on 26 July 1876, with amendments, which were considered and agreed to by the House of Lords on 28 July 1876.

The bill was granted royal assent on 11 August 1876.

== Provisions ==
=== Repealed acts ===
Section 4 of the act repealed 3 enactments, listed in the first schedule to the act.

Citation	Short title	Title	Extent of repeal
25 & 26 Vict. c. 87	Industrial and Provident Societies Act 1862	An Act to consolidate and amend the Laws relating to Industrial and Provident Societies.	The whole act.
30 & 31 Vict. c. 117	Industrial and Provident Societies Act 1867	An Act to amend the Industrial and Provident Societies Acts.	The whole act.
34 & 35 Vict. c. 80	Industrial and Provident Societies Act 1871	An Act to explain and amend the Law relating to Industrial and Provident Societies.	The whole act.

== Subsequent developments ==
The act was described as a Consolidation Act.

The whole act was repealed by the Industrial and Provident Societies Act 1893 (56 & 57 Vict. c. 39), which came into force on 1 January 1894.
