= Income Tax Act 1842 =

Act of the Parliament of the United Kingdom

Income Tax Act 1842 (Note: The citation of this act by this short title was authorised by section 1 of, and the first schedule to, the Short Titles Act 1896. Due to the repeal of those provisions it is now authorised by section 19(2) of the Interpretation Act 1978.)
- Act of Parliament
- Parliament of the United Kingdom
- Long title: An Act for granting to Her Majesty Duties on Profits arising from Property, Professions, Trades and Offices, until the Sixth Day of April, One thousand eight hundred and forty-five.
- Citation: 5 & 6 Vict. c. 35
- Territorial extent: United Kingdom

Dates
- Royal assent: 22 June 1842
- Commencement: 5 April 1842 (Note: Section 1.)
- Repealed: 6 April 1919
Other legislation
Amended by	Statute Law Revision Act 1874 (No. 2); Perjury Act 1911; Forgery Act 1913
Repealed by	Income Tax Act 1918
Relates to	Income Tax Act 1803

Status: Repealed

Text of statute as originally enacted

The Income Tax Act 1842 (5 & 6 Vict. c. 35) was an act of the Parliament of the United Kingdom, passed under the government of Robert Peel, which re-introduced an income tax in Britain, at the rate of 7 pence (2.9%, there then being 240 pence in the pound) in the pound on all annual incomes greater than £150. It was the first imposition of income tax in Britain outside of wartime. Although promoted as a temporary measure, income tax has been levied continually in Britain ever since. In its detail, the 1842 act was substantially similar to the Income Tax Act 1803 (43 Geo. 3. c. 122) introduced by Henry Addington during the Napoleonic Wars.

== Subsequent developments ==
The whole act was repealed by section 238 of, and the seventh schedule to, the Income Tax Act 1918 (8 & 9 Geo. 5. c. 40), which came into force on 6 April 1919.

== See also ==
- UK tax
- UK labour law
