= Industrial and Provident Societies Act 1893 =

Act of the Parliament of the United Kingdom

Industrial and Provident Societies Act 1893 (Note: Section 1.)
- Act of Parliament
- Parliament of the United Kingdom
- Long title: An Act to consolidate and amend the Laws relating to Industrial and Provident Societies.
- Citation: 56 & 57 Vict. c. 39
- Introduced by: George Howell MP (Commons)
- Territorial extent: {{England and Wales|Scotland|Ireland|Channel Islands}} (Note: Section 2.)

Dates
- Royal assent: 12 September 1893
- Commencement: 12 September 1893 (Note: The Acts of Parliament (Commencement) Act 1793.)
- Repealed: 1 January 1966 (Note: The Industrial and Provident Societies Act 1965 (Commencement) Order 1965 (SI 1965/2051).)

Other legislation
- Amends: Customs and Inland Revenue Act 1880; Provident Nominations and Small Intestacies Act 1883
- Repeals/revokes: Industrial and Provident Societies Act 1876
- Amended by: Industrial and Provident Societies Act 1867; Industrial and Provident Societies Act 1871; Industrial and Provident Societies Act 1894; Industrial and Provident Societies (Amendment) Act 1895; Industrial and Provident Societies (Amendment) Act 1913; Income Tax Act 1918; Industrial and Provident Societies (Amendment) Act 1928; Industrial and Provident Societies Act 1952; Industrial and Provident Societies (Amendment) Act 1954; Industrial and Provident Societies Act 1961
- Repealed by: Industrial and Provident Societies Act 1965
- Relates to: Industrial and Provident Societies Act 1852; Industrial and Provident Societies Act 1862; Industrial and Provident Societies Act 1876; Industrial and Provident Societies Act 1965

Status: Repealed

History of passage through Parliament

Records of Parliamentary debate relating to the statute from Hansard

Text of statute as originally enacted

The Industrial and Provident Societies Act 1893 (56 & 57 Vict. c. 39) was an act of the Parliament of the United Kingdom that consolidated and amended the law relating to industrial and provident societies.

== Background ==
The first legislation basis for industrial and provident societies was provided for by the Industrial and Provident Societies Partnership Act 1852 (15 & 16 Vict. c. 31). This legislation was subsequently amended by the Industrial and Provident Societies Act 1854 (17 & 18 Vict. c. 25) and the Industrial and Provident Societies Act 1856 (19 & 20 Vict. c. 40) to improve legal proceedings concerning societies formed under the act.

Legislation relating to industrial and provident societies was subsequently amended and consolidated by the Industrial and Provident Societies Act 1862 (25 & 26 Vict. c. 87) and the Industrial and Provident Societies Act 1876 (39 & 40 Vict. c. 45).

== Passage ==
Leave to bring in the Industrial and Provident Societies Bill to the House of Commons was granted to George Howell MP, Horace Plunkett MP, William Mather MP, Gerald Balfour MP, Sir Henry Roscoe MP, Charles Fenwick MP and Michael Austin MP on 11 April 1893. The bill had its first reading in the House of Commons on 11 April 1893, presented by George Howell MP. The bill had its second reading in the House of Commons on 17 June 1893 and was committed to a committee of the whole house, which met and reported on 19 June 1893, with amendments. The amended bill was re-committed to a committee of the whole house, which met on 26 June 1893, 28 June 1893, with amendments. The committee was discharged on 4 July 1893 and was referred to a select committee, which was appointed on 5 July 1893 with a quorum of 5 and the power to send for "persons, paper and records".

Name	Party	Commentary
George Bartley	Conservative	
Richard Causton	Liberal	
Henry Fenwick	Liberal	
Henry Hobhouse	Liberal Unionist	
George Howell	Liberal-Labour	
William Mather	Liberal	
Sir Herbert Maxwell	Conservative	Chair
Bernard Charles Molloy	Irish Parliamentary Party	
Sir Francis Powell	Conservative	

The committee reported on 13 July 1893, with amendments. The amended bill was re-committed to a committee of the whole house, which met and reported on 17 July 1893, without amendments. The bill had its third reading in the House of Commons on 17 July 1893 and passed, without amendments.

The bill had its first reading in the House of Lords on 18 July 1893. The bill had its second reading in the House of Lords on 27 July 1893 and was committed to a committee of the whole house, which met and reported on 28 July 1893, without amendments. The bill was considered, with amendments, and re-committed to a committee of the whole house, which met and reported on 7 August 1893, without amendments. The bill was committed to a standing committee, which reported on 8 August 1893, with amendments, and 24 August 1893, with amendments. The amended bill had its third reading in the House of Lords on 28 August 1893 and passed, without amendments.

The amended bill was considered and agreed to by the House of Commons on 31 August 1893.

The bill was granted royal assent on 12 September 1893.

== Provisions ==
=== Repealed acts ===
Section 80 of the act repealed three enactments, listed in the first schedule to the act.

Citation	Short title	Extent of repeal
39 & 40 Vict. c. 45	Industrial and Provident Societies Act 1876	The whole act.
43 Vict. c. 14	Customs and Inland Revenue Act 1880	Section 8.
46 & 47 Vict. c. 47	Provident Nominations and Small Intestacies Act 1883	So much as relates to industrial and provident societies.

== Subsequent developments ==
The whole act was repealed by section 77(1) of, and schedule 5 to, the Industrial and Provident Societies Act 1965 (c. 12), which came into force on 1 January 1966.
