= List of acts of the Parliament of the United Kingdom from 1876 =

This is a complete list of acts of the Parliament of the United Kingdom for the year 1876.

Note that the first parliament of the United Kingdom was held in 1801; parliaments between 1707 and 1800 were either parliaments of Great Britain or of Ireland). For acts passed up until 1707, see the list of acts of the Parliament of England and the list of acts of the Parliament of Scotland. For acts passed from 1707 to 1800, see the list of acts of the Parliament of Great Britain. See also the list of acts of the Parliament of Ireland.

For acts of the devolved parliaments and assemblies in the United Kingdom, see the list of acts of the Scottish Parliament, the list of acts of the Northern Ireland Assembly, and the list of acts and measures of Senedd Cymru; see also the list of acts of the Parliament of Northern Ireland.

The number shown after each act's title is its chapter number. Acts passed before 1963 are cited using this number, preceded by the year(s) of the reign during which the relevant parliamentary session was held; thus the Union with Ireland Act 1800 is cited as "39 & 40 Geo. 3 c. 67", meaning the 67th act passed during the session that started in the 39th year of the reign of George III and which finished in the 40th year of that reign. Note that the modern convention is to use Arabic numerals in citations (thus "41 Geo. 3" rather than "41 Geo. III"). Acts of the last session of the Parliament of Great Britain and the first session of the Parliament of the United Kingdom are both cited as "41 Geo. 3".

Some of these acts have a short title. Some of these acts have never had a short title. Some of these acts have a short title given to them by later acts, such as by the Short Titles Act 1896.

== 39 & 40 Vict. ==
The third session of the 21st Parliament of the United Kingdom, which met from 8 February 1876 until 15 August 1876.

=== Public general acts ===
Short title	Citation	Royal assent
Long title
Exchequer Bonds Act 1876 (repealed)	39 & 40 Vict. c. 1	9 March 1876
An Act to raise the sum of Four million and eighty thousand pounds by Exchequer Bonds. (Repealed by Statute Law Revision Act 1894 (57 & 58 Vict. c. 56))
Consolidated Fund Act (4,080,000l.) or the Supply Act 1876 (repealed)	39 & 40 Vict. c. 2	9 March 1876
An Act to apply the sum of Four million and eighty thousand pounds out of the Consolidated Fund to the service of the year ending on the thirty-first day of March one thousand eight hundred and seventy-six. (Repealed by Statute Law Revision Act 1883 (46 & 47 Vict. c. 39))
Epping Forest Act 1876 (repealed)	39 & 40 Vict. c. 3	17 March 1876
An Act to extend the Time for the Epping Forest Commissioners to make their Final Report. (Repealed by Statute Law Revision Act 1898 (61 & 62 Vict. c. 22))
Consolidated Fund Act (10,029,550l. 5s. 1d.) (repealed)	39 & 40 Vict. c. 4	27 March 1876
An Act to apply certain sums out of the Consolidated Fund to the Service of the years ending the thirty-first day of March one thousand eight hundred and seventy-five, one thousand eight hundred and seventy-six, and one thousand eight hundred and seventy-seven. (Repealed by Statute Law Revision Act 1883 (46 & 47 Vict. c. 39))
Telegraph (Money) Act 1876 (repealed)	39 & 40 Vict. c. 5	27 March 1876
An Act for enabling a further Sum to be raised for the purposes of the Telegraph Acts, 1868 to 1870. (Repealed by Statute Law Revision Act 1894 (57 & 58 Vict. c. 56) and Statute Law Revision Act 1950 (14 Geo. 6. c. 6))
Sea Insurances (Stamping of Policies) Amendment Act 1876 (repealed)	39 & 40 Vict. c. 6	7 April 1876
An Act to amend the Law relating to the Stamping of Policies of Sea Insurance. (Repealed by Stamp Act 1891 (54 & 55 Vict. c. 39))
Council of India Act 1876 (repealed)	39 & 40 Vict. c. 7	7 April 1876
An Act to amend the Law relating to certain Appointments to the Council of India. (Repealed by Council of India Act 1907 (7 Edw. 7. c. 35))
Mutiny Act 1876 (repealed)	39 & 40 Vict. c. 8	7 April 1876
An Act for punishing Mutiny and Desertion, and for the better payment of the Army and their Quarters. (Repealed by Statute Law Revision Act 1883 (46 & 47 Vict. c. 39))
Marine Mutiny Act 1876 (repealed)	39 & 40 Vict. c. 9	7 April 1876
An Act for the Regulation of Her Majesty's Royal Marine Forces while on shore. (Repealed by Statute Law Revision Act 1883 (46 & 47 Vict. c. 39))
Royal Titles Act 1876 (repealed)	39 & 40 Vict. c. 10	27 April 1876
An Act to enable Her most Gracious Majesty to make an addition to the Royal Style and Titles appertaining to the Imperial Crown of the United Kingdom and its Dependencies. (Repealed by Statute Law Revision Act 1958 (6 & 7 Eliz. 2. c. 46))
United Parishes (Scotland) Act 1876 (repealed)	39 & 40 Vict. c. 11	1 June 1876
An Act to amend the Act of the Seventh and Eighth Years of Her Majesty, Chapter Forty-four, relating to the Formation of quoad sacra Parishes in Scotland. (Repealed by Abolition of Feudal Tenure etc. (Scotland) Act 2000 (asp 5))
Burgesses Qualification (Scotland) Act 1876 (repealed)	39 & 40 Vict. c. 12	1 June 1876
An Act to assimilate the Law of Scotland to that of England respecting the creation of Burgesses. (Repealed by Town Councils (Scotland) Act 1900 (63 & 64 Vict. c. 49))
Drugging of Animals Act 1876 (repealed)	39 & 40 Vict. c. 13	1 June 1876
An Act to prevent the Administration of Poisonous Drugs to Horses and other Animals. (Repealed by Protection of Animals Act 1911 (1 & 2 Geo. 5. c. 27))
Chelsea Hospital Act 1876	39 & 40 Vict. c. 14	1 June 1876
An Act to extend the provisions of the Exchequer and Audit Departments Act, 1866, (Note: Exchequer and Audit Departments Act 1866 (29 & 30 Vict. c. 39)) to the Accounts of the Commissioners for the Government of the Royal Hospital at Chelsea.
Consolidated Fund Act (11,000,000l.) (repealed)	39 & 40 Vict. c. 15	1 June 1876
An Act to apply the sum of Eleven million pounds out of the Consolidated Fund to the service of the year ending the thirty-first day of March one thousand eight hundred and seventy-seven. (Repealed by Statute Law Revision Act 1883 (46 & 47 Vict. c. 39))
Customs and Inland Revenue Act 1876 (repealed)	39 & 40 Vict. c. 16	1 June 1876
An Act to grant and alter certain Duties of Customs and Inland Revenue, and to amend the Laws relating to Customs and Inland Revenue. (Repealed by Finance Act 1949 (12, 13 & 14 Geo. 6. c. 47))
Partition Act 1876	39 & 40 Vict. c. 17	27 June 1876
An Act to amend the Partition Act, 1868. (Note: Partition Act 1868 (31 & 32 Vict. c. 40)) (Repealed for England and Wales by Law of Property (Amendment) Act 1924 (15 & 16 Geo. 5. c. 5) and Law of Property Act 1925 (15 & 16 Geo. 5. c. 20))
Treasury Solicitor Act 1876	39 & 40 Vict. c. 18	27 June 1876
An Act to incorporate the Solicitor for the affairs of Her Majesty's Treasury, and make further provision respecting the grant of the administration of the Estates of deceased persons for the use of Her Majesty.
Salmon Fisheries Act 1876 or the Salmon Fishery Act 1876 (repealed)	39 & 40 Vict. c. 19	27 June 1876
An Act to amend the Law relating to Salmon Fisheries in England and Wales. (Repealed by Salmon and Freshwater Fisheries Act 1923 (13 & 14 Geo. 5. c. 16))
Statute Law Revision (Substituted Enactments) Act 1876 (repealed)	39 & 40 Vict. c. 20	27 June 1876
An Act to facilitate the Revision of the Statute Law by substituting in certain Acts, incorporating Enactments which have been otherwise repealed, a reference to recent Enactments still in force. (Repealed by Statute Law (Repeals) Act 1993 (c. 50))
Jurors Qualification (Ireland) Act 1876 (repealed)	39 & 40 Vict. c. 21	30 June 1876
An Act to amend the Laws relating to the Qualification of Jurors in Ireland. (Repealed by Jury Laws Amendment Act (Northern Ireland) 1926 (16 & 17 Geo. 5. c. 15 (N.I.)))
Trade Union Act Amendment Act 1876 (repealed)	39 & 40 Vict. c. 22	30 June 1876
An Act to amend the Trade Union Act, 1871. (Note: Trade Union Act 1871 (34 & 35 Vict. c. 31)) (Repealed for England and Wales and Scotland by Industrial Relations Act 1971 (c. 72) and for Northern Ireland by Industrial Relations (Northern Ireland) Order 1992 (SI 1992/807 (N.I. 5)))
Prevention of Crimes Amendment Act 1876 (repealed)	39 & 40 Vict. c. 23	13 July 1876
An Act to amend the Prevention of Crimes Act, 1871. (Note: Prevention of Crimes Act 1871 (34 & 35 Vict. c. 112)) (Repealed for England and Wales by Criminal Law Act 1967 (c. 58) and for Scotland by Statute Law (Repeals) Act 1971 (c. 52))
Small Testate Estates (Scotland) Act 1876	39 & 40 Vict. c. 24	13 July 1876
An Act for the Relief of the Executors of Testates in Scotland where the Personal Estate is of small Value.
Burgh Wards (Scotland) Act 1876 (repealed)	39 & 40 Vict. c. 25	13 July 1876
An Act to amend the Law in Scotland in regard to the division of Burghs into Wards. (Repealed by Town Councils (Scotland) Act 1900 (63 & 64 Vict. c. 49))
Publicans' Certificates (Scotland) Act 1876 (repealed)	39 & 40 Vict. c. 26	13 July 1876
An Act to assimilate the Law of Scotland relating to the granting of Licenses to sell intoxicating Liquors to the Law of England. (Repealed by Licensing (Scotland) Act 1903 (3 Edw. 7. c. 25))
Local Light Dues Reduction Act 1876 (repealed)	39 & 40 Vict. c. 27	13 July 1876
An Act to authorise the Reduction of Local Light Dues. (Repealed by Merchant Shipping Act 1894 (57 & 58 Vict. c. 60))
Court of Admiralty (Ireland) Amendment Act 1876 (repealed)	39 & 40 Vict. c. 28	13 July 1876
An Act to amend the Court of Admiralty (Ireland) Act, 1867, (Note: Court of Admiralty (Ireland) Act 1867 (30 & 31 Vict. c. 114)) and confer a more extended Admiralty Jurisdiction on the Recorders of Cork and Belfast. (Repealed by Judicature (Northern Ireland) Act 1978 (c. 23))
Wild Fowl Preservation Act 1876 or the Preservation of Wild Fowl Act 1876 the Wild Fowl Protection Act 1876, the Wild Fowl Act 1876, the Wild Birds Protection Act 1876 and the Wild Birds Act 1876. (repealed)	39 & 40 Vict. c. 29	24 July 1876
An Act for the Preservation of Wild Fowl. (Repealed by Wild Birds Protection Act 1880 (43 & 44 Vict. c. 35))
Settled Estates Act 1876 or the Settled Estates (Amendment) Act 1876 (repealed)	39 & 40 Vict. c. 30	24 July 1876
An Act to amend the Settled Estates Act of 1856. (Repealed by Settled Estates Act 1877 (40 & 41 Vict. c. 18))
Public Works Loans (Money) Act 1876	39 & 40 Vict. c. 31	24 July 1876
An Act to grant Money for the purpose of Loans by the Public Works Loan Commissioners, and to amend the Public Works Loans Act, 1875. (Note: Public Works Loans Act 1875 (38 & 39 Vict. c. 89))
Friendly Societies Amendment Act 1876 (repealed)	39 & 40 Vict. c. 32	24 July 1876
An Act to amend the Friendly Societies Act, 1875. (Note: Friendly Societies Act 1875 (38 & 39 Vict. c. 60)) (Repealed by Friendly Societies Act 1887 (50 & 51 Vict. c. 56))
Trade Marks Registration Amendment Act 1876 (repealed)	39 & 40 Vict. c. 33	24 July 1876
An Act for the Amendment of the Trade Marks Registration Act, 1875. (Note: Trade Marks Registration Act 1875 (38 & 39 Vict. c. 91)) (Repealed by Patents, Designs, and Trade Marks Act 1883 (46 & 47 Vict. c. 57))
Elver Fishing Act 1876 (repealed)	39 & 40 Vict. c. 34	24 July 1876
An Act to amend the Law relating to Elver Fishing. (Repealed by Salmon and Freshwater Fisheries Act 1923 (13 & 14 Geo. 5. c. 16))
Customs Tariff Act 1876 (repealed)	39 & 40 Vict. c. 35	24 July 1876
An Act for consolidating the Duties of Customs. (Repealed by Statute Law (Repeals) Act 1971 (c. 52))
Customs Consolidation Act 1876	39 & 40 Vict. c. 36	24 July 1876
An Act to consolidate the Customs Laws.
Nullum Tempus (Ireland) Act 1876 (repealed)	39 & 40 Vict. c. 37	11 August 1876
An Act to assimilate the Law in Ireland to the Law in England as to quieting Possessions and Titles against the Crown. (Repealed for the Republic of Ireland by Statute of Limitations Act 1957 (No 6) and for Northern Ireland by Statute of Limitations Act (Northern Ireland) 1958 (c. 10 (N.I.)))
Pauper Children (Ireland) Act 1876 (repealed)	39 & 40 Vict. c. 38	11 August 1876
An Act to extend the Limits of Age up to which, with the assent of Boards of Guardians, orphan and deserted pauper Children may be supported out of Workhouses in Ireland. (Repealed by Pauper Children (Ireland) Act 1898 (61 & 62 Vict. c. 30) (Note: Incorrectly cited as "Pauper Children (I), 1876 c 30" in the Chronological Table of the Statutes.))
Annual Turnpike Acts Continuance Act 1876 (repealed)	39 & 40 Vict. c. 39	11 August 1876
An Act to continue certain Turnpike Acts in Great Britain, and to repeal certain other Turnpike Acts; and for other purposes connected therewith. (Repealed by Statute Law Revision Act 1898 (61 & 62 Vict. c. 22))
Medical Practitioners Act 1876 (repealed)	39 & 40 Vict. c. 40	11 August 1876
An Act for enabling legally qualified Medical Practitioners to hold certain public Medical Appointments, and for amending the Medical Act. (Repealed by Medical Act 1956 (4 & 5 Eliz. 2. c. 76))
Medical Act 1876 (repealed)	39 & 40 Vict. c. 41	11 August 1876
An Act to remove Restrictions on the granting of Qualifications for Registration under the Medical Act on the ground of Sex. (Repealed by Statute Law (Repeals) Act 1976 (c. 16))
Convict Prisons Returns Act 1876 (repealed)	39 & 40 Vict. c. 42	11 August 1876
An Act to amend the Law respecting certain Returns from Convict Prisons. (Repealed for England and Wales and Scotland by Statute Law Revision Act 1966 (c. 5) and for Northern Ireland by Statute Law Revision Act 1883 (46 & 47 Vict. c. 39) and Statute Law Revision Act (Northern Ireland) 1954 (c. 35 (N.I.)))
Isle of Man (Officers) Act 1876 (repealed)	39 & 40 Vict. c. 43	11 August 1876
An Act to make provision respecting the Superannuation Allowances or Pensions of Persons employed in the Service of Her Majesty in the Government of the Isle of Man. (Repealed by Isle of Man Act 1958 (6 & 7 Eliz. 2. c. 11))
Legal Practitioners (Ireland) Act 1876 (repealed)	39 & 40 Vict. c. 44	11 August 1876
An Act to amend the Law relating to Legal Practitioners in Ireland. (Repealed by Solicitors (Northern Ireland) Order 1976 (SI 1976/582 (N.I. 12)))
Industrial and Provident Societies Act 1876 (repealed)	39 & 40 Vict. c. 45	11 August 1876
An Act to consolidate and amend the Laws relating to Industrial and Provident Societies. (Repealed by Industrial and Provident Societies Act 1893 (56 & 57 Vict. c. 39))
Slave Trade Act 1876 (repealed)	39 & 40 Vict. c. 46	11 August 1876
An Act for more effectually punishing Offences against the Laws relating to the Slave Trade. (Repealed by Statute Law Revision Act 1964 (c. 79))
Saint Vincent, Tobago, and Grenada Constitution Act 1876 or the St. Vincent and Grenada Constitution Act 1876 (repealed)	39 & 40 Vict. c. 47	11 August 1876
An Act to make provision for the Government of the Islands of Saint Vincent, Tobago, and Grenada, and their Dependencies. (Repealed by West Indies Act 1962 (c. 19))
Bankers' Books Evidence Act 1876 (repealed)	39 & 40 Vict. c. 48	11 August 1876
An Act to amend the Law with reference to Bankers' Books Evidence. (Repealed by Bankers' Books Evidence Act 1879 (42 & 43 Vict. c. 11))
Burghs Gas Supply (Scotland) Act 1876 (repealed)	39 & 40 Vict. c. 49	11 August 1876
An Act to make provision for lighting Burghs in Scotland with Gas. (Repealed by Gas Act 1948 (11 & 12 Geo. 6. c. 67))
Poor Law Rating (Ireland) Act 1876 (repealed)	39 & 40 Vict. c. 50	11 August 1876
An Act to amend the Law for the Relief of the Poor in Ireland in respect to rating and chargeability on Poor Law Unions. (Repealed by Statute Law Revision Act 1894 (57 & 58 Vict. c. 56), Local Government (Ireland) Act 1898 (61 & 62 Vict. c. 37), Welfare Services Act (Northern Ireland) 1949 (c. 1 (N.I.)), Children and Young Persons Act (Northern Ireland) 1950 (c. 5 (N.I.)) and Statute Law Revision Act (Northern Ireland) 1954 (c. 35 (N.I.)))
Cattle Disease (Ireland) Act 1876 (repealed)	39 & 40 Vict. c. 51	11 August 1876
An Act to amend the Acts relating to Cattle Disease in Ireland. (Repealed by Contagious Diseases (Animals) Act 1878 (41 & 42 Vict. c. 74))
Savings Bank (Barrister) Act 1876 or the Savings Banks (Barrister) Act 1876 (repealed)	39 & 40 Vict. c. 52	11 August 1876
An Act to amend the Law respecting the Powers and Duties vested in the Barrister appointed to certify the Rules of Savings Banks. (Repealed by Post Office Savings Bank Act 1954 (2 & 3 Eliz. 2. c. 62) and Trustee Savings Banks Act 1954 (2 & 3 Eliz. 2. c. 63))
Superannuation Act 1876 (repealed)	39 & 40 Vict. c. 53	11 August 1876
An Act to make further provision respecting the Superannuation Allowance to be granted to Civil Servants serving in unhealthy Climates. (Repealed for England and Wales and Scotland by Superannuation Act 1949 (12, 13 & 14 Geo. 6. c. 44) and for Northern Ireland by Superannuation Act (Northern Ireland) 1949 (c. 13 (N.I.)))
Bishopric of Truro Act 1876 (repealed)	39 & 40 Vict. c. 54	11 August 1876
An Act to provide for the Foundation of a new Bishopric out of a part of the diocese of Exeter. (Repealed by Statute Law (Repeals) Act 1973 (c. 39))
Metropolitan Board of Works (Loans) Act 1876 (repealed)	39 & 40 Vict. c. 55	11 August 1876
An Act for further amending the Acts relating to the raising of Money by the Metropolitan Board of Works; and for other purposes relating thereto. (Repealed by London County Council (Finance Consolidation) Act 1912 (2 & 3 Geo. 5. c. cv))
Commons Act 1876	39 & 40 Vict. c. 56	11 August 1876
An Act for facilitating the regulation and improvement of Commons, and for amending the Acts relating to the Inclosure of Commons.
Winter Assizes Act 1876 (repealed)	39 & 40 Vict. c. 57	11 August 1876
An Act to amend the Law respecting the holding of Winter Assizes. (Repealed for England and Wales by Supreme Court of Judicature (Consolidation) Act 1925 (15 & 16 Geo. 5. c. 49) and Courts Act 1971 (c. 23) and for Northern Ireland by Administration of Justice (Northern Ireland) Order 1975 (SI 1975/816 (N.I. 7)))
Parochial Records Act 1876	39 & 40 Vict. c. 58	11 August 1876
An Act to amend the Law relating to Parochial Records.
Appellate Jurisdiction Act 1876 (repealed)	39 & 40 Vict. c. 59	11 August 1876
An Act for amending the Law in respect of the Appellate Jurisdiction of the House of Lords; and for other purposes. (Repealed for the United Kingdom by Constitutional Reform Act 2005 (c. 4) and for the Isle of Man by Statute Law Revision (Isle of Man) Act 1991 (c. 61))
Appropriation Act 1876 (repealed)	39 & 40 Vict. c. 60	15 August 1876
An Act to apply a sum out of the Consolidated Fund to the service of the year ending the thirty-first day of March one thousand eight hundred and seventy-seven, and to appropriate the Supplies granted in this Session of Parliament. (Repealed by Statute Law Revision Act 1883 (46 & 47 Vict. c. 39))
Divided Parishes and Poor Law Amendment Act 1876 (repealed)	39 & 40 Vict. c. 61	15 August 1876
An Act to provide for the better arrangement of divided Parishes and other local areas, and to make sundry amendments in the Law relating to the Relief of the Poor in England. (Repealed by Statute Law Revision Act 1894 (57 & 58 Vict. c. 56), Poor Law Act 1927 (17 & 18 Geo. 5. c. 14), Local Government Act 1929 (19 & 20 Geo. 5. c. 17), Local Government Act 1933 (23 & 24 Geo. 5. c. 51), London Government Act 1939 (2 & 3 Geo. 6. c. 40), National Assistance Act 1948 (11 & 12 Geo. 6. c. 29), Statute Law Revision Act 1950 (14 Geo. 6. c. 6) and Distress for Rates Act 1960 (8 & 9 Eliz. 2. c. 12))
Sale of Exhausted Parish Lands Act 1876 (repealed)	39 & 40 Vict. c. 62	15 August 1876
An Act to make provision for the Disposal of certain Lands appropriated for the supply of materials for the repair of public and private roads. (Repealed by Local Government Act 1933 (23 & 24 Geo. 5. c. 51) and London Government Act 1939 (2 & 3 Geo. 6. c. 40))
Notices to Quit (Ireland) Act 1876 (repealed)	39 & 40 Vict. c. 63	15 August 1876
An Act to render necessary in Ireland a Year's Notice to Quit to determine a Tenancy from Year to Year, and otherwise to amend the Law as to Notices to Quit. (Repealed by Property (Northern Ireland) Order 1997 (SI 1997/1179))
Police (Expenses) Continuance Act 1876 (repealed)	39 & 40 Vict. c. 64	15 August 1876
An Act to continue for one year the Police (Expenses) Act, 1875. (Note: Police (Expenses) Act 1875 (38 & 39 Vict. c. 48)) (Repealed by Statute Law Revision Act 1883 (46 & 47 Vict. c. 39))
Tramways (Ireland) Amendment (Dublin) Act 1876 or the Dublin Tramways Act 1876	39 & 40 Vict. c. 65	15 August 1876
An Act to amend the Tramways (Ireland) Act, 1860, (Note: Tramways (Ireland) Act 1860 (23 & 24 Vict. c. 152)) and the Tramways (Ireland) Amendment Act, 1861, (Note: Tramways (Ireland) Amendment Act 1861 (24 & 25 Vict. c. 102)) as regards the application of the same to the county and the county of the city of Dublin.
Legal Practitioners Act 1876 (repealed)	39 & 40 Vict. c. 66	15 August 1876
An Act to amend the Law relating to Legal Practitioners. (Repealed by Statute Law Revision and Civil Procedure Act 1881 (44 & 45 Vict. c. 59))
Suez Canal (Shares) Act 1876 (repealed)	39 & 40 Vict. c. 67	15 August 1876
An Act for making provision respecting Shares in the Capital of the Universal Company of the Maritime Canal of Suez, acquired on behalf of the Crown. (Repealed by Statute Law Revision Act 1894 (57 & 58 Vict. c. 56) and Statute Law (Repeals) Act 1993 (c. 50))
Superannuation Post Office and War Office Act 1876 (repealed)	39 & 40 Vict. c. 68	15 August 1876
An Act to amend the Law for the payment of Remuneration and the Grant of Superannuation Allowances and Gratuities to certain persons employed under Her Majesty's Principal Secretary of State for the War Department and Her Majesty's Postmaster General. (Repealed by Statute Law Revision Act 1883 (46 & 47 Vict. c. 39))
Expiring Laws Continuance Act 1876 (repealed)	39 & 40 Vict. c. 69	15 August 1876
An Act to continue various expiring Laws. (Repealed by Statute Law Revision Act 1883 (46 & 47 Vict. c. 39))
Sheriff Courts (Scotland) Act 1876	39 & 40 Vict. c. 70	15 August 1876
An Act to alter and amend the Law relating to the Administration of Justice in Civil Causes in the ordinary Sheriff Courts in Scotland, and for other purposes relating thereto.
Chairman of Quarter Sessions (Ireland) Jurisdiction Act 1876 (repealed)	39 & 40 Vict. c. 71	15 August 1876
An Act to amend the Laws relating to the Jurisdiction of Chairmen of Quarter Sessions in Ireland. (Repealed by Statute Law Revision Act 1894 (57 & 58 Vict. c. 56) and County Courts Act (Northern Ireland) 1959 (c. 25 (N.I.)))
Norwich and Boston Corrupt Voters Act 1876 (repealed)	39 & 40 Vict. c. 72	15 August 1876
An Act to suspend for a limited period the holding of an Election of a Member or Members to serve in Parliament for the City of Norwich, and to disfranchise certain voters for the said City, and also certain voters for the Borough of Boston. (Repealed by Statute Law Revision Act 1883 (46 & 47 Vict. c. 39))
Pensions Commutation Act 1876 (repealed)	39 & 40 Vict. c. 73	15 August 1876
An Act to amend the Pensions Commutation Act, 1871. (Note: Pensions Commutation Act 1871 (34 & 35 Vict. c. 36)) (Repealed by Statute Law Revision Act 1966 (c. 5))
Agricultural Holdings (England) Act (1875) Amendment Act 1876 (repealed)	39 & 40 Vict. c. 74	15 August 1876
An Act for amending so much of the Agricultural Holdings (England) Act, 1875, (Note: Agricultural Holdings (England) Act 1875 (38 & 39 Vict. c. 92)) as relates to the Governors of the Bounty of Queen Anne for the Augmentation of the Maintenance of the Poor Clergy. (Repealed by Agricultural Holdings (England) Act 1883 (46 & 47 Vict. c. 61))
Rivers Pollution Prevention Act 1876 (repealed)	39 & 40 Vict. c. 75	15 August 1876
An Act for making further Provision for the Prevention of the Pollution of Rivers. (Repealed for England and Wales by Public Health Act 1936 (26 Geo. 5 & 1 Edw. 8. c. 49), Rivers (Prevention of Pollution) Act 1951 (14 & 15 Geo. 6. c. 64) and London Government Act 1963 (c. 33), for Scotland by Sewerage (Scotland) Act 1968 (c. 47) and for Northern Ireland by Water (Northern Ireland) Act 1972 (c. 5 (N.I.)) and Water and Sewerage Services (Northern Ireland) Order 1973 (SI 1973/70 (N.I. 2)))
Municipal Privilege Act, Ireland, 1876 or the Municipal Privilege (Ireland) Act 1876 (repealed)	39 & 40 Vict. c. 76	15 August 1876
An Act to extend the privileges of Municipal Corporations in Ireland. (Repealed by Local Government Reorganisation (Consequential Provisions) (Northern Ireland) Order 1973 (SI 1973/2095) and Northern Ireland (Lieutenancy) Order 1975 (SI 1975/156))
Cruelty to Animals Act 1876 (repealed)	39 & 40 Vict. c. 77	15 August 1876
An Act to amend the Law relating to Cruelty to Animals. (Repealed by Animals (Scientific Procedures) Act 1986 (c. 14))
Juries Procedure (Ireland) Act 1876	39 & 40 Vict. c. 78	15 August 1876
An Act to amend the Procedure connected with Trial by Jury in Ireland.
Elementary Education Act 1876 or the Sandon's Education Act (repealed)	39 & 40 Vict. c. 79	15 August 1876
An Act to make further provision for Elementary Education. (Repealed by Education Act 1921 (11 & 12 Geo. 5. c. 51))
Merchant Shipping Act 1876 (repealed)	39 & 40 Vict. c. 80	15 August 1876
An Act to amend the Merchant Shipping Acts. (Repealed by Merchant Shipping Act 1894 (57 & 58 Vict. c. 60))
Crossed Cheques Act 1876 (repealed)	39 & 40 Vict. c. 81	15 August 1876
An Act for amending the Law relating to Crossed Cheques. (Repealed by Bills of Exchange Act 1882 (45 & 46 Vict. c. 61))

=== Local acts ===
Short title	Citation	Royal assent
Long title
Marriages (St James' Chapel of Ease) Buxton 1876 Act (repealed)	39 & 40 Vict. c. i	17 March 1876
An Act to render valid Marriages heretofore solemnised in the Chapel of Ease of Saint James in the parish of Buxton in the county of Derby. (Repealed by Statute Law (Repeals) Act 1977)
Drainage and Improvement of Lands Supplemental Act (Ireland) 1876	39 & 40 Vict. c. ii	17 March 1876
An Act to confirm two Provisional Orders made under "The Drainage and Improvement of Lands (Ireland) Act, 1863," and the Acts amending the same.
Manchester Post Office Act 1876 (repealed)	39 & 40 Vict. c. iii	7 April 1876
An Act to enable Her Majesty's Postmaster General to acquire a site for the extension of the Manchester General Post Office. (Repealed by Postal Services Act 2000 (Consequential Modifications to Local Enactments) Order 2003 (SI 2003/1542))
County Palatine of Lancaster (Clerk of the Peace) Act 1876 (repealed)	39 & 40 Vict. c. iv	7 April 1876
An Act to amend the Act for making regulations as to the Office of Clerk of the Peace for the County Palatine of Lancaster. (Repealed by Local Government (Clerks) Act 1931 (21 & 22 Geo. 5. c. 45))
Derby Gas Act 1876	39 & 40 Vict. c. v	7 April 1876
An Act to confirm the holding of certain Lands by the Derby Gaslight and Coke Company, to enable that Company to raise additional Capital, and for other purposes.
Ely, Haddenham, and Sutton Railway Extension Act 1876	39 & 40 Vict. c. vi	7 April 1876
An Act to authorise the Ely, Haddenham, and Sutton Railway Company to extend their authorised Railway to the Saint Ives and March Railway of the Great Eastern Railway; to change their name; and for other purposes.
Scotswood, Newburn and Wylam Railway (Abandonment of Dock) Act 1876	39 & 40 Vict. c. vii	7 April 1876
An Act to authorise the Scotswood, Newburn, and Wylam Railway and Dock Company to abandon the Construction of the Dock and Branch Railway near Scotswood Bridge in the county of Northumberland, to change their name; and for other purposes.
Drainage and Improvement of Lands Supplemental Act (Ireland) 1876 (No. 2)	39 & 40 Vict. c. viii	27 April 1876
An Act to confirm two Provisional Orders made under "The Drainage and Improvement of Lands (Ireland) Act, 1863," and the Acts amending the same.
Manchester and Milford Railway Act 1876	39 & 40 Vict. c. ix	27 April 1876
An Act to authorise an Extension of Time for purchasing Land and completing the Railway authorised by the Manchester and Milford Railway (Devils Bridge Branch) Act, 1873.
Folkestone Gas Act 1876	39 & 40 Vict. c. x	27 April 1876
An Act to authorise the Folkestone Gas and Coke Company to acquire further Lands; to extend their Works; to raise additional Capital; and for other purposes.
City of Dublin Steam Packet Company's Act 1876 (repealed)	39 & 40 Vict. c. xi	27 April 1876
An Act to authorise the City of Dublin Steam Packet Company to make further Arrangements for the Investment of their Reserve Fund; and for other purposes. (Repealed by Statute Law (Repeals) Act 2013 (c. 2))
Shepton Mallet Waterworks Act 1876	39 & 40 Vict. c. xii	27 April 1876
An Act to enable the Shepton Mallet Waterworks Company to construct additional Works and to raise further Capital; and for other purposes.
Local Government Board's Provisional Orders Confirmation (Arundel, &c.) Act 1876	39 & 40 Vict. c. xiii	1 June 1876
An Act to confirm certain Provisional Orders of the Local Government Board relating to the Borough of Arundel, the District of Bacup, the Rural Sanitary District of the Caistor Union, the City of Carlisle, the District of Milton-next-Sittingborne, the Borough of Northampton, and the District of Toxteth Park.
	Arundel Order 1876	
	Bacup Order 1876	
	Caistor Union Order 1876	
	Carlisle Order 1876	
	Milton-next-Sittingborne Order 1876	
	Northampton Order 1876	
	Toxteth Park Order 1876	
Local Government Board's Provisional Orders Confirmation (Cumberworth, &c.) Act 1876	39 & 40 Vict. c. xiv	1 June 1876
An Act to confirm certain Provisional Orders made by the Local Government Board under the Poor Law Amendment Act, 1867, (Note: Poor Law Amendment Act 1867 (30 & 31 Vict. c. 106)) with reference to the townships of Cumberworth and Cumberworth-Half, in the West Riding of the county of York, and the borough of King's Lynn, in the county of Norfolk.
	Cumberworth and Cumberworth-Half Order 1876	
	King's Lynn Order 1876	
Local Government Board's Provisional Orders Confirmation (Blackburn, &c.) Act 1876	39 & 40 Vict. c. xv	1 June 1876
An Act to confirm certain Provisional Orders of the Local Government Board relating to the borough of Blackburn, and to the Districts of Downham Market, Melksham, Milnrow, and Saint Hellen's.
	Blackburn Order 1876	
	Downham Market Order 1876	
	Melksham Order 1876	
	Milnrow Order 1876	
	St. Helens Order 1876	
Local Government Board's Provisional Orders Confirmation (Briton Ferry, &c.) Act 1876	39 & 40 Vict. c. xvi	1 June 1876
An Act to confirm certain Provisional Orders of the Local Government Board relating to the Districts of Briton Ferry and Clayton, the Rural Sanitary District of the Coventry Union, the Borough of Nottingham (two), and the Districts of Oystermouth and Ripley.
	Briton Ferry Order 1876	
	Clayton Order 1876	
	Coventry Union Order 1876	
	Nottingham (No. 1) Order 1876	
	Nottingham (No. 2) Order 1876	
	Oystermouth Order 1876	
	Ripley Order 1876	
Local Government Board's (Gas) Provisional Order Confirmation Act, 1876	39 & 40 Vict. c. xvii	1 June 1876
An Act to confirm a Provisional Order of the Local Government Board under the provisions of the Gas and Water Works Facilities Act, 1870, (Note: Gas and Water Works Facilities Act 1870 (33 & 34 Vict. c. 70)) and the Public Health Act, 1875, (Note: Public Health Act 1875 (38 & 39 Vict. c. 55)) relating to the District of Skelmersdale, in the county of Lancaster.
	Skelmersdale Gas Order 1876	
Poolbeg Lighthouse Act 1876	39 & 40 Vict. c. xviii	1 June 1876
An Act for vesting Poolbeg Lighthouse in the Dublin Port and Docks Board; and for other purposes relating thereto.
South Alloa Dock Act 1876	39 & 40 Vict. c. xix	1 June 1876
An Act to enlarge the Powers of the South Alloa Dock Company.
Assam Company's (Reduction of Capital) Act 1876	39 & 40 Vict. c. xx	1 June 1876
An Act for the Reduction of the Nominal Capital of The Assam Company.
Bousfield's Patent Act 1876	39 & 40 Vict. c. xxi	1 June 1876
An Act for rendering valid certain Letters Patent granted to George Tomlinson Bousfield for Improvements in Lacing Devices and in the Mode of Lacing and Fastening Wearing Apparel and other Articles with the same.
Hall's Patent Act 1876	39 & 40 Vict. c. xxii	1 June 1876
An Act for rendering valid certain Letters Patent granted to Charles Henry Hall for Improvements in Steam Pumps or Apparatus for Elevating Fluids by Steam.
Milner's Patent Act 1876	39 & 40 Vict. c. xxiii	1 June 1876
An Act for rendering valid certain Letters Patent granted to Edward Milner for Improvements in the Method of producing White Pigments from Lead.
British Gaslight Company, Limited (Hull Station) Act 1876	39 & 40 Vict. c. xxiv	1 June 1876
An Act for empowering the British Gaslight Company, Limited, to enlarge their Works, to extend their Limits, and to expend further Capital at Kingstonupon-Hull; and for other purposes.
Padiham Local Board Act 1876	39 & 40 Vict. c. xxv	1 June 1876
An Act for empowering the Local Board for the District of Padiham and Hapton, in the county of Lancaster, to acquire the Undertaking of the Padiham Gaslight and Coke Company; and for other purposes.
Leicester Improvement Act 1876 (repealed)	39 & 40 Vict. c. xxvi	1 June 1876
An Act to enable the Mayor, Aldermen, and Burgesses of the Borough of Leicester to construct additional Works for the Prevention of Floods in the Borough; and for other purposes. (Repealed by Leicestershire Act 1985 (c. xvii))
Upper Inny Drainage Act 1876	39 & 40 Vict. c. xxvii	1 June 1876
An Act for extending the time for the completion of the Works authorised by "The Drainage and Improvement of Lands Supplemental Act (Ireland) 1868."
Pegwell Bay Reclamation and Sandwich Haven Improvement (Amendment) Act 1876	39 & 40 Vict. c. xxviii	1 June 1876
An Act for extending the time limited by the Pegwell Bay Reclamation and Sandwich Haven Improvement Act, 1873, (Note: Pegwell Bay Reclamation and Sandwich Haven Improvement Act 1873 (36 & 37 Vict. c. ccxix)) for the Purchase of Land and the Completion of Works; and for other purposes.
Sillar's and Wigner's Patent Act 1876	39 & 40 Vict. c. xxix	1 June 1876
An Act for rendering valid certain Letters Patent granted to William Cameron Sillar, Robert George Sillar, and George William Wigner, for Improvements in deodorising and purifying Sewage and making Manure therefrom.
Coombe Hill Canal Navigation (Abandonment) Act 1876	39 & 40 Vict. c. xxx	1 June 1876
An Act to provide for the closing of the Coombe Hill Canal Navigation and the Sale of the Site thereof; and for other purposes.
Romsey Extension and Improvement Act 1876	39 & 40 Vict. c. xxxi	1 June 1876
An Act for extending the Boundary of the Borough of Romsey, in the county of Southampton; and for other purposes.
Maidenhead Gas Act 1876	39 & 40 Vict. c. xxxii	1 June 1876
An Act for incorporating the Maidenhead Gas Company, and for conferring upon them powers for the supply of Gas to the borough of Maidenhead and certain neighbouring places in the counties of Berks and Buckingham and for other purposes.
Edinburgh and District Waterworks Act 1876 (repealed)	39 & 40 Vict. c. xxxiii	1 June 1876
An Act to enable the Edinburgh and District Water Trustees to abandon their authorised Edgelaw Reservoir, and to construct the same on another Site, and also to construct a Reservoir at Rosebery, and other Works, and to make further provision for the supply of Water to their District, and otherwise; and for other purposes. (Repealed by Edinburgh Corporation Order Confirmation Act 1958 (7 & 8 Eliz. 2. c. v))
Brighton Pavilion Acts Amendment Act 1876 (repealed)	39 & 40 Vict. c. xxxiv	1 June 1876
An Act for amending the Act (Local) of the thirteenth year of Her present Majesty, chapter five, commonly known as the Brighton Improvement (Purchase of Royal Pavilion, &c.) Act; and for other purposes. (Repealed by Brighton Corporation Act 1931 (21 & 22 Geo. 5. c. cix))
City of Glasgow Union Railway Act 1876	39 & 40 Vict. c. xxxv	1 June 1876
An Act to confer further powers on the City of Glasgow Union Railway Company, the Glasgow and South-western Railway Company, and the North British Railway Company; and for other purposes.
Rossendale Union Gas Act 1876	39 & 40 Vict. c. xxxvi	1 June 1876
An Act to grant further Powers to the Rossendale Union Gas Company.
Thames Tunnel Act 1876	39 & 40 Vict. c. xxxvii	1 June 1876
An Act to amend and extend the Thames Tunnel Act, 1866, (Note: Thames Tunnel Act 1866 (29 & 30 Vict. c. xx)) and for other purposes.
Erwood Bridge Act 1876	39 & 40 Vict. c. xxxviii	1 June 1876
An Act for incorporating the Erwood Bridge Company, and for empowering them to construct a bridge over the River Wye, with approaches thereto, in the counties of Brecon and Radnor; and for other purposes.
Flookersbrook Improvement Act 1876	39 & 40 Vict. c. xxxix	1 June 1876
An Act for improving certain Waste Lands called Flookersbrook, in the Townships of Newton and Hoole and County of Chester; and for other purposes.
Pier and Harbour Orders Confirmation Act 1876	39 & 40 Vict. c. xl	27 June 1876
An Act for confirming certain Provisional Orders made by the Board of Trade under The General Pier and Harbour Act, 1861, (Note: General Pier and Harbour Act 1861 (24 & 25 Vict. c. 45)) relating to Aldborough, Cattewater, Gardenstown, and Llandudno.
	Aldborough Pier and Improvements Order 1876	
	Cattewater Harbour Order 1876	
	Gardenstown Harbour Order 1876	
	Llandudno Pier Order 1876	
Gas and Water Orders Confirmation Act 1876 No. 1	39 & 40 Vict. c. xli	27 June 1876
An Act for confirming certain Provisional Orders made by the Board of Trade under the Gas and Water Works Facilities Act, 1870, relating to Brentford Gas, North Middlesex Gas, North Ormesby Gas, Retford Gas, Risca and Pontymister Gas, Saint Anne's-on-the-Sea Gas, Tottenham and Edmonton Gas, Worksop Gas, Chiltern Hills Spring Water, Flamborough Water, Stockport District Water, Wisbech Water, and Clacton-on-Sea Gas and Water.
	Brentford Gas Order 1876	
	North Middlesex Gas Order 1876	
	North Ormesby Gas Order 1876	
	Retford Gas Order 1876	
	Risca and Pontymister Gas Order 1876	
	St. Anne's-on-Sea Gas Order 1876	
	Tottenham and Edmonton Gas Order 1876	
	Worksop Gas Order 1876	
	Chiltern Hills Spring Water Order 1876	
	Flamborough Water Order 1876	
	Stockport District Water Order 1876	
	Wisbech Water Order 1876	
	Clacton-on-Sea Gas and Water Order 1876	
Tramways Order Confirmation (Wantage) Act 1876	39 & 40 Vict. c. xlii	27 June 1876
An Act for confirming a Provisional Order made by the Board of Trade under The Tramways Act, 1870, (Note: Tramways Act 1870 (33 & 34 Vict. c. 78)) relating to Wantage Tramways.
	Wantage Tramways Order 1876	
Army Corps Training Act 1876 (repealed)	39 & 40 Vict. c. xliii	27 June 1876
An Act to facilitate the assembling and training of certain Army Corps. (Repealed by Army Corps Training Act 1876 (c. xliii))
All Saints Moss Act 1876	39 & 40 Vict. c. xliv	27 June 1876
An Act for remedying certain defects in the constitution of the District of All Saints, Moss, in the County and Diocese of York.
Allan Glen's Institution Act 1876	39 & 40 Vict. c. xlv	27 June 1876
An Act for varying the Purposes of the Trust constituted by Allan Glen; for incorporating the Trustees of Allan Glen's Institution in the City of Glasgow; for conferring powers upon the Trustees; and for other purposes.
Mid-Wales Railway (Western Extensions) Abandonment Act 1876	39 & 40 Vict. c. xlvi	27 June 1876
An Act for the abandonment of the Railway authorised to be made by the "Mid-Wales Railway (Western Extensions) Act, 1865." (Note: Mid Wales Railway (Western Extensions) Act 1865 (28 & 29 Vict. c. ccclxxi))
Furness Railway Act 1876	39 & 40 Vict. c. xlvii	27 June 1876
An Act for conferring further Powers on the Furness Railway Company, for the Construction of Works, the Acquisition of Lands, the Raising of Money, and otherwise in relation to their Undertaking; and for other purposes.
Caledonian Railway (Grangemouth Harbour) Act 1876 (repealed)	39 & 40 Vict. c. xlviii	27 June 1876
An Act for enabling the Caledonian Railway Company to make a Wet Dock, Timber Basin, Quays, and other Works at Grangemouth, and to improve the Navigation of the River Carron; for altering the rates leviable at the Harbour of Grangemouth; for extending the period limited for the acquisition by the said Company of Lands near that Port; and for other purposes. (Repealed by Forth Ports Authority Order Confirmation Act 1969 (c. xxxiv))
Chesterfield Waterworks and Gaslight Company's Act 1876 (repealed)	39 & 40 Vict. c. xlix	27 June 1876
An Act to grant further powers to the Chesterfield Water Works and Gaslight Company. (Repealed by Chesterfield Corporation Act 1923 (13 & 14 Geo. 5. c. xcix))
York New Waterworks Act 1876	39 & 40 Vict. c. l	27 June 1876
An Act for empowering the York New Waterworks Company to construct additional Works; to raise additional Capital; and for other purposes.
Cleator and Workington Junction Railway Act 1876	39 & 40 Vict. c. li	27 June 1876
An Act to authorise the construction of Railways in Cumberland, to be called the Cleator and Workington Junction Railway.
East London Railway Act 1876	39 & 40 Vict. c. lii	27 June 1876
An Act to enable the East London Railway Company to make a new Junction with the Main Line of the Great Eastern Railway Company; and for other purposes.
Glasgow and South Western Railway Act 1876	39 & 40 Vict. c. liii	27 June 1876
An Act for conferring further powers on the Glasgow and South-western Railway Company for the construction of Works and the acquisition of Lands; for converting and consolidating the several classes of their Shares and Stocks; and for other purposes.
London and Blackwall Railway Act 1876	39 & 40 Vict. c. liv	27 June 1876
An Act to authorise the widening of parts of the London and Blackwall Railway and the enlargement of some of the Stations; to authorise agreements with other Companies; and for other purposes.
London, Brighton and South Coast, and Tunbridge Wells and Eastbourne Railway Companies Act 1876	39 & 40 Vict. c. lv	27 June 1876
An Act to vest in the London, Brighton, and South Coast Railway Company the Undertaking of the Tunbridge Wells and Eastbourne Railway Company, and to make better provision for railway communication to Eastbourne.
Royal Albert Hall Act 1876	39 & 40 Vict. c. lvi	27 June 1876
An Act to make better Provision for the Maintenance of the Royal Albert Hall.
West Kent Main Sewerage (Amendment) Act 1876	39 & 40 Vict. c. lvii	27 June 1876
An Act for authorising a deviation of the line of a Sewer to be constructed in pursuance of the West Kent Main Sewerage Act, 1875, (Note: West Kent Main Sewerage Act 1875 (38 & 39 Vict. c. clxiii)) and for amending that Act; and for other purposes.
Whitehaven, Cleator, and Egremont Railway Act 1876	39 & 40 Vict. c. lviii	27 June 1876
An Act to authorise the Whitehaven, Cleator, and Egremont Railway Company to make new Railways in the county of Cumberland; to raise further Capital; and for other purposes.
Wilts and Berks Canal Act 1876	39 & 40 Vict. c. lix	27 June 1876
An Act for incorporating the Wilts and Berks Canal Company; for the transfer to them of the Undertaking of the Wilts and Berks Canal Navigation; and for other purposes.
Galashiels Municipal Extension, Police, and Water Act 1876	39 & 40 Vict. c. lx	27 June 1876
An Act to extend the Municipal Boundaries of the Burgh of Galashiels; to provide for the maintenance by the Corporation of the Roads and Streets within the burgh, and to bring in a supply of Water thereto; and for other purposes.
Newport (Isle of Wight) Borough Act 1876 (repealed)	39 & 40 Vict. c. lxi	27 June 1876
An Act to define, alter, and extend the Boundaries of the Borough and Urban Sanitary District of Newport in the Isle of Wight; and for other purposes. (Repealed by Isle of Wight Act 1980 (c. xv))
Scottish Equitable Life Assurance Act 1876 (repealed)	39 & 40 Vict. c. lxii	27 June 1876
An Act to amend, vary, and extend the powers of the Scottish Equitable Life Assurance Society; and for other purposes relating thereto. (Repealed by Scottish Equitable Life Assurance Act 1889 (52 & 53 Vict. c. c))
Newcastle-upon-Tyne Quayside Lift Act 1876	39 & 40 Vict. c. lxiii	27 June 1876
An Act to incorporate a Company with powers to erect Machinery for raising and lowering Passengers, Vehicles, Animals, and Goods between the Quayside and the Castle Yard at Newcastle-upon-Tyne.
Caledonian Railway (Additional Powers) Act 1876	39 & 40 Vict. c. lxiv	27 June 1876
An Act for enabling the Caledonian Railway Company to make certain railways and other works, and to acquire certain lands, in the counties of Lanark, Stirling, Edinburgh, Renfrew, and Forfar; for abandoning certain authorised works in the county of Forfar; for extending the periods limited by certain former Acts; for sanctioning certain modifications of a scheme for the conversion and consolidation of certain classes of Shares and Stock in the said Company; and for other purposes.
Vale of Clyde Tramways Act 1876 (repealed)	39 & 40 Vict. c. lxv	27 June 1876
An Act to amend "The Vale of Clyde Tramways Act, 1871." (Note: Vale of Clyde Tramways Act 1871 (34 & 35 Vict. c. cviii)) (Repealed by Glasgow Corporation Consolidation (Water, Transport and Markets) Order Confirmation Act 1964 (c. xliii))
Sutton Harbour (Duchy of Cornwall) Act 1876	39 & 40 Vict. c. lxvi	27 June 1876
An Act to authorise the Duke of Cornwall and the Sutton Harbour Improvement Company to enter into and carry into effect Agreements for certain purposes.
Gorleston and Southtown Gas Act 1876	39 & 40 Vict. c. lxvii	27 June 1876
An Act for dissolving the Gorleston and Southdown Gaslight and Coke Company, Limited, for re-incorporating the Proprietors therein with others, and for conferring powers on the Company so to be incorporated; and for other purposes.
Great Eastern Railway Act 1876	39 & 40 Vict. c. lxviii	27 June 1876
An Act for authorising the Great Eastern Railway Company to make several Railways and other works, and for conferring on them further powers in relation to their Undertaking and the Undertakings of certain other Companies; and for other purposes.
Mersey Dock (Canada Entrances) Act 1876	39 & 40 Vict. c. lxix	27 June 1876
An Act to authorise the Mersey Docks and Harbour Board to improve the river entrance to the Canada Basin; and for other purposes.
Glasgow and Kilmarnock Joint Line Act 1876	39 & 40 Vict. c. lxx	27 June 1876
An Act for enabling the Caledonian and the Glasgow and South-western Railway Companies jointly to acquire certain lands and execute certain works in the counties of Lanark and Renfrew; for authorising the diversion of a certain road, and of certain authorised Tramways in connexion therewith; and for other purposes.
Plymouth Dock (Devonport) Waterworks Act 1876	39 & 40 Vict. c. lxxi	27 June 1876
An Act for conferring further powers on the Company of Proprietors of the Plymouth Dock Waterworks for the supply of water and otherwise in relation to their undertaking; and for other purposes.
Methodist Conference Act 1876	39 & 40 Vict. c. lxxii	27 June 1876
An Act to enable the Yearly Conference of the People called Methodists to delegate or confer certain powers to or upon Conferences in Australasia and elsewhere, and to confirm past Acts in relation thereto; and for other purposes.
Burry Port and North Western Junction Railway Act 1876	39 & 40 Vict. c. lxxiii	27 June 1876
An Act to authorise the construction of a Railway from the Burry Port and Gwendreath Valley Railway to the Line of the Central Wales and Carmarthen Junction Railway Company; and for other purposes.
Great Western and Bristol and Exeter Railway Companies Amalgamation Act 1876	39 & 40 Vict. c. lxxiv	27 June 1876
An Act to amalgamate the Undertakings of the Great Western and Bristol and Exeter Railway Companies; and for other purposes.
Western Bank of Scotland (Liquidation) Act 1876	39 & 40 Vict. c. lxxv	27 June 1876
An Act for promoting the winding up of the Western Bank of Scotland, and providing for the disposal and discharge of the remaining assets and liabilities of the Bank; and for other purposes.
Willesden Local Board Act 1876	39 & 40 Vict. c. lxxvi	27 June 1876
An Act to enable the Board of Waywardens of the Edgware Highway District to make certain Payments to the Local Board of the Willesden Urban Sanitary District, out of the Income of Trust Estates and Funds vested in them under "The Metropolis (Kilburn and Harrow) Roads Act, 1872," (Note: Metropolis (Kilburn and Harrow) Roads Act 1872 (35 & 36 Vict. c. xlix)) to vary the provisions of the said Act, to discharge the said Waywardens from the obligation to maintain portions of certain Roads; and for other purposes.
Merionethshire Railway (Extension of Time) Act 1876 (repealed)	39 & 40 Vict. c. lxxvii	27 June 1876
An Act to extend the time for the completion of the Merionethshire Railway. (Repealed by Merionethshire Railway (Abandonment) Act 1887 (50 & 51 Vict. c. cviii))
Llanfyllin and Llangynog Railway Abandonment Act 1876 (repealed)	39 & 40 Vict. c. lxxviii	27 June 1876
An Act for the abandonment of the Llanfyllin and Llangynog Railway. (Repealed by Statute Law (Repeals) Act 2013 (c. 2))
Metropolitan Board of Works (Various Powers) Act 1876 (repealed)	39 & 40 Vict. c. lxxix	27 June 1876
An Act for enabling the Metropolitan Board of Works to make a new Street from Sun Street to Worship Street; to undertake certain duties in connexion with the Chelsea Embankment; and for other purposes. (Repealed by Local Law (Greater London Council and Inner London Boroughs) Order 1965 (SI 1965/540))
City of Norwich Waterworks Act 1876 (repealed)	39 & 40 Vict. c. lxxx	27 June 1876
An Act to authorise the City of Norwich Waterworks Company to raise additional Capital, and to extend their Limits of Supply; and for other purposes. (Repealed by Norwich City Council Act 1984 (c. xxiii))
Ruthin and Cerrig-y-druidion Railway Act 1876 (repealed)	39 & 40 Vict. c. lxxxi	27 June 1876
An Act for making a Railway from Ruthin to Cerrig-y-Druidion, in the County of Denbigh. (Repealed by Statute Law (Repeals) Act 2013 (c. 2))
Great Yarmouth and Stalham (Light) Railway Act 1876	39 & 40 Vict. c. lxxxii	27 June 1876
An Act for making a Railway from Great Yarmouth in the county of Norfolk to Stalham in the same county; and for other purposes.
Forth Bridge Railway Act 1876	39 & 40 Vict. c. lxxxiii	27 June 1876
An Act to extend the time for the purchase of lands for and for the construction of the Forth Bridge Railway.
London, Chatham, and Dover Railway Act 1876	39 & 40 Vict. c. lxxxiv	27 June 1876
An Act for conferring further powers on the London, Chatham, and Dover Railway Company; and for other purposes.
Dublin Port and Docks Board (Bridges) Act 1876	39 & 40 Vict. c. lxxxv	27 June 1876
An Act enabling the Dublin Port and Docks Board to enlarge or rebuild Carlisle Bridge, and to construct eastward thereof an opening bridge over the Liffey; providing funds for the execution of those works; and for other purposes.
National Assurance Company of Ireland Act 1876 (repealed)	39 & 40 Vict. c. lxxxvi	27 June 1876
An Act for transferring to the National Assurance Company of Ireland the business of the Liberal Annuity Company of Dublin; for amending the Charter of the first-named Company; and for other purposes. (Repealed by National Assurance Company of Ireland Act 1906 (6 Edw. 7. c. xxxvii))
Local Government Board's Provisional Orders Confirmation (Aberavon, &c.) Act 1876	39 & 40 Vict. c. lxxxvii	30 June 1876
An Act to confirm certain Provisional Orders of the Local Government Board relating to the Boroughs of Aberavon, Andover, Brighton, and Burnley, the Districts of Merthyr Tydvil and Pensarn, the Rural Sanitary District of the Tadcaster Union, and the Borough of Truro.
	Aberavon Order 1876	
	Andover Order 1876	
	Brighton Order 1876	
	Burnley Order 1876	
	Merthyr Tydfil Order 1876	
	Pensarn Order 1876	
	Tadcaster Order 1876	
	Truro Order 1876	
Sutton Bridge Dock Act 1876	39 & 40 Vict. c. lxxxviii	30 June 1876
An Act for conferring further powers on the Sutton Bridge Dock Company for the construction of Works, the raising of Money, and otherwise in relation to their Undertaking; and for other purposes.
Leigh and Hindley Local Boards (Water) Act 1876	39 & 40 Vict. c. lxxxix	30 June 1876
An Act to enable the Local Boards for the Districts of Leigh and Hindley, both in the county of Lancaster, to construct Waterworks and to supply Water, and for transferring to them certain rights of the South Lancashire Waterworks Company; and for other purposes.
Slaithwaite Gas Act 1876	39 & 40 Vict. c. xc	30 June 1876
An Act for dissolving and re-incorporating the Slaithwaite Gaslight Company, Limited, and granting powers for supplying with Gas the Township of Slaithwaite and certain neighbouring Townships and Places in the West Riding of the county of York.
Oyster and Mussel Fisheries Order Confirmation Act 1876	39 & 40 Vict. c. xci	13 July 1876
An Act to confirm an order made by the Board of Trade under the Sea Fisheries Act, 1868, (Note: Sea Fisheries Act 1868 (31 & 32 Vict. c. 45)) relating to Truro.
Gas and Water Orders Confirmation (Chapel-en-le-Frith, &c.) Act 1876	39 & 40 Vict. c. xcii	13 July 1876
An Act for confirming certain Provisional Orders made by the Board of Trade under the Gas and Water Works Facilities Act, 1870, relating to Chapelen-le-Frith Gas, Cromer Gas, Hythe and Sandgate Gas, Poole Gas, Neath Water, Newbury Water, Wantage Water, Connah's Quay Gas and Water, and Flint Gas and Water.
	Chapel-en-le-Frith Gas Order 1876	
	Cromer Gas Order 1876	
	Hythe and Sandgate Gas Order 1876	
	Town and County of Poole Gas Order 1876	
	Neath Water Order 1876	
	Newbury District Water Order 1876	
	Wantage Water Order 1876	
	Connah's Quay Gas and Water Order 1876	
	Flint Gas and Water Order 1876	
Coroners (Dublin) Act 1876	39 & 40 Vict. c. xciii	13 July 1876
An Act to amend the law relating to Coroners in the County of the City of Dublin.
Public Health (Scotland) Act 1867 Order Confirmation (Wemyss) Act 1876 (repealed)	39 & 40 Vict. c. xciv	13 July 1876
An Act to confirm a Provisional Order made under the "Public Health (Scotland) Act, 1867," (Note: Public Health (Scotland) Act 1867 (30 & 31 Vict. c. 101)) relating to the parish of Wemyss, in the county of Fife. (Repealed by Fife County Council Order Confirmation Act 1940 (3 & 4 Geo. 6. c. xliii))
Kingstown Harbour Act 1876	39 & 40 Vict. c. xcv	13 July 1876
An Act further to amend the Acts relating to Kingstown Harbour.
Smithfield Penitentiary Dublin Act 1876	39 & 40 Vict. c. xcvi	13 July 1876
An Act to authorise the sale of Smithfield Penitentiary Convict Prison, Dublin.
Local Government Board's Provisional Orders Confirmation (Bristol, &c.) Act 1876	39 & 40 Vict. c. xcvii	13 July 1876
An Act to confirm certain Provisional Orders of the Local Government Board relating to the City of Bristol, the District of Burslem, the Borough of Huntingdon (two), the District of Newton-in-Mackerfield, and the Boroughs of Preston and Ryde.
	Bristol Order 1876	
	Burslem Order 1876	
	Huntingdon (No. 1) Order 1876	
	Huntingdon (No. 2) Order 1876	
	Newton-in-Mackerfield Order 1876	
	Preston Order 1876	
	Ryde Order 1876	
Waterford, New Ross, and Wexford Junction Railway (Sale) Act 1876	39 & 40 Vict. c. xcviii	13 July 1876
An Act to enable the Great Southern and Western Railway Company and the Dublin, Wicklow, and Wexford Railway Company to purchase the Waterford, New Ross, and Wexford Junction Railway from the Public Works Loan Commissioners; and to raise Money for such purpose.
Caterham and Godstone Valley Railway Act 1876	39 & 40 Vict. c. xcix	13 July 1876
An Act for making a Railway in the County of Surrey, to be called "The Caterham and Godstone Valley Railway."
Huddersfield Waterworks and Improvement Act 1876	39 & 40 Vict. c. c	13 July 1876
An Act to enable the Mayor, Aldermen, and Burgesses of the Borough of Huddersfield to abandon the enlargement of Wessenden Reservoir, and to construct a new Reservoir in lieu thereof; to make new Streets and Street improvements; to extend the limits of Gas and Water Supply; and to make further provision for the improvement and Government of the Borough; and for other purposes.
Kildwick Parish Gas Act 1876	39 & 40 Vict. c. ci	13 July 1876
An Act for incorporating the Kildwick Parish Gas Company, and authorising them to supply Gas in the Parish of Kildwick, in the West Riding of the County of York; and for other purposes.
North Eastern Railway Company's Act 1876	39 & 40 Vict. c. cii	13 July 1876
An Act for enabling the North-eastern Railway Company to make new Railways and Works, and for conferring additional powers on the Company in relation to their own Undertaking and the Undertakings of other Companies; and for other purposes.
Paisley Waterworks Act 1876	39 & 40 Vict. c. ciii	13 July 1876
An Act for extending the time for the completion of Works authorised to be constructed by the Paisley Waterworks Commissioners; for reviving the powers of compulsory purchase of Lands for the purposes of certain of those works; for authorising those Commissioners to construct additional Works, to supply Water by measure, and to borrow further money; for the prevention of waste of the Water supplied by them; and for other purposes.
Upper Mersey Navigation Act 1876	39 & 40 Vict. c. civ	13 July 1876
An Act for creating a Commission for Lighting and Buoying the Upper Mersey; for authorising that Commission to levy and receive certain Rates and Dues; and for other purposes.
Whitehaven Harbour and Town Improvement Act 1876	39 & 40 Vict. c. cv	13 July 1876
An Act to amend the qualification of persons entitled to vote in the Election of Trustees for the Town and Harbour of Whitehaven; to extend the periods for the compulsory purchase of Lands and for the completion of certain authorised Works; to authorise and alter certain tolls, rates, duties, and charges; to grant further powers to the trustees with reference to the Harbour, and with reference to the supply of Water; and with reference to the Town of Whitehaven, and other purposes.
Uppingham Waterworks Act 1876	39 & 40 Vict. c. cvi	13 July 1876
An Act for better supplying with Water the parish of Uppingham, in the county of Rutland; and for other purposes.
Bristol United Gaslight Company's (New Works) Act 1876	39 & 40 Vict. c. cvii	13 July 1876
An Act to authorise the Bristol United Gaslight Company to purchase additional Lands and erect Works for the manufacture and storage of Gas and residual products thereon, and to construct two Bridges across Avon Street.
Kilsyth Railway Act 1876	39 & 40 Vict. c. cviii	13 July 1876
An Act for making a Railway from the authorised Kelvin Valley Railway to Kilsyth, in the county of Stirling; and for other purposes.
London, Brighton, and South Coast Railway (Chichester and Midhurst Railway) Act 1876	39 & 40 Vict. c. cix	13 July 1876
An Act for authorising the London, Brighton, and South Coast Railway Company to make a Railway from their Railway at Chichester to their Mid-Sussex and Midhurst Junction Railway at Midhurst; and for other purposes.
Letterkenny Railway Act 1876	39 & 40 Vict. c. cx	13 July 1876
An Act to authorise the levy of a rate in aid of the Letterkenny Railway, to extend the time for completing that Undertaking; and to make further provisions with reference thereto.
Rochester Bridge Act 1876 (repealed)	39 & 40 Vict. c. cxi	13 July 1876
An Act to amend various Acts relating to Rochester Bridge, in the county of Kent, and to make further provisions for the election of Wardens and Assistants and Auditors of Rochester Bridge; and for other matters relating thereto. (Repealed by Rochester Bridge Act 1908 (8 Edw. 7. c. lvii))
Felixstowe Railway and Pier (New Works and Additional Powers) Act 1876 (repealed)	39 & 40 Vict. c. cxii	13 July 1876
An Act to authorise the Felixstowe Railway and Pier Company to construct a Tidal Basin or Dock and other works at Felixstowe in the county of Suffolk; and for other purposes. (Repealed by Felixstowe Dock and Railway Act 1956 (4 & 5 Eliz. 2. c. lxxxviii))
Southampton Docks Act 1876	39 & 40 Vict. c. cxiii	13 July 1876
An Act for authorising the Southampton Dock Company to construct a Graving Dock.
Ivel Navigation (Abandonment) Act 1876	39 & 40 Vict. c. cxiv	13 July 1876
An Act to provide for the closing of the Ivel Navigation; the extinction of the Commission; and for other purposes.
Somerset and Dorset Railway Leasing Act 1876	39 & 40 Vict. c. cxv	13 July 1876
An Act for vesting the Somerset and Dorset Railway in the London and South-western and Midland Railway Companies by way of Lease; and for other purposes.
South Western Railway (Exeter and Crediton and North Devon) Act 1876	39 & 40 Vict. c. cxvi	13 July 1876
An Act to authorise the Purchase by the London and South-western Railway Company of the Exeter and Crediton Railway, and the removal of the Broad Gauge Rails on that and other Railways in North Devon; and for other purposes.
Sittingbourne and Sheerness Railway (Dissolution and Appropriation of Surplus) Act 1876	39 & 40 Vict. c. cxvii	13 July 1876
An Act to make further provision with respect to the winding up of the affairs of the Sittingbourne and Sheerness Railway Company; the payment of their remaining Debts, and the Distribution of any Surplus of Assets; the Dissolution of the Company; and for other purposes.
Stockton-on-Tees Market Act 1876 (repealed)	39 & 40 Vict. c. cxviii	13 July 1876
An Act to empower the Mayor, Aldermen, and Burgesses of the Borough of Stockton-on-Tees to erect Cattle and other Markets; and for other purposes. (Repealed by Teesside Corporation Act 1971 (c.xvii))
Walsall Gas Purchase and Borough Extension Act 1876 (repealed)	39 & 40 Vict. c. cxix	13 July 1876
An Act for extending the boundaries of the Municipal Borough of Walsall, in the county of Stafford, and for transferring to the Mayor, Aldermen, and Burgesses of the Borough, the powers, duties, and property of the Commissioners acting under The Walsall Improvement and Market Act, 1848, (Note: Walsall Improvement and Market Act 1848 (11 & 12 Vict. c. clxi)) and for authorising the Purchase by the Mayor, Aldermen, and Burgesses of so much of the Gas Undertaking, late of the Birmingham and Staffordshire Gas Light Company, as relates to the supply of Gas within the Borough; and for other purposes. (Repealed by Walsall Corporation Act 1969 (c. lviii))
Rosstrevor Improvement Act 1876	39 & 40 Vict. c. cxx	13 July 1876
An Act to authorise the Construction of a Pier, Carriage Road, or Promenade, Tramway, and Waterworks at or near Rosstrevor, in the county of Down.
Bromley Direct Railway Act 1876	39 & 40 Vict. c. cxxi	13 July 1876
An Act to extend the time limited by "The Bromley Direct Railway Act, 1874," (Note: Bromley Direct Railway Act 1874 (37 & 38 Vict. c. cxix)) for the completion of the Railway and works connected therewith.
Blackrod Local Board Act 1876	39 & 40 Vict. c. cxxii	13 July 1876
An Act for empowering the Local Board for the district of Blackrod, in the county of Lancaster, to make Waterworks, and to supply their district with Water; and for other purposes.
Sutton Gas Act 1876	39 & 40 Vict. c. cxxiii	13 July 1876
An Act for dissolving the Sutton Gas Light and Coke Company (Limited), for re-incorporating the Proprietors therein with others, and for conferring powers on the Company so to be incorporated; and for other purposes.
Great North of Scotland Railway (Further Powers) Act 1876	39 & 40 Vict. c. cxxiv	13 July 1876
An Act to provide for the Amalgamation of the Deeside and Aboyne and Braemar Railway Companies with the Great North of Scotland Railway Company; and for other purposes.
North Wales Narrow Gauge Railways Act 1876	39 & 40 Vict. c. cxxv	13 July 1876
An Act to authorise the abandonment of Railway No. 1 authorised by "The North Wales Narrow Gauge Railways Act, 1872," (Note: North Wales Narrow Gauge Railways Act 1872 (35 & 36 Vict. c. clxxv)) and to enable the North Wales Narrow Gauge Railways Company to raise further Capital; and for other purposes.
Redcar and Coatham Gas Act 1876 (repealed)	39 & 40 Vict. c. cxxvi	13 July 1876
An Act for dissolving and re-incorporating the Redcar Gas Company, Limited, and granting powers for supplying with Gas the town of Redcar and certain neighbouring townships and places in the north riding of the county of York; and for other purposes. (Repealed by Redcar Urban District Council Gas Act 1920 (10 & 11 Geo. 5. c. lx))
Southport Improvement Act 1876	39 & 40 Vict. c. cxxvii	13 July 1876
An Act to enable the Mayor, Aldermen, and Burgesses of the Borough of Southport to construct New Streets and other Works; to construct a New Promenade; to purchase the Undertaking of the Southport Tramways Company, Limited; to make further provisions for the Improvement of the Borough; and for other purposes.
Spennymoor and Tudhoe Gas Act 1876	39 & 40 Vict. c. cxxviii	13 July 1876
An Act for incorporating and conferring Powers on the Spennymoor and Tudhoe Gas Company.
Humber Conservancy Act 1876	39 & 40 Vict. c. cxxix	13 July 1876
An Act to extend and amend the Humber Conservancy Acts, 1852, 1868, and 1871, and to confer further powers on the Humber Conservancy Commissioners; and for other purposes.
Edinburgh Improvement Act 1876 (repealed)	39 & 40 Vict. c. cxxx	13 July 1876
An Act for acquisition by the Lord Provost, Magistrates, and Council of the City of Edinburgh of the West Princes Street Gardens there, for the purpose of the same being laid open to the Public; and for the acquisition of lands at Inverleith for the formation of an Arboretum and Public Park and Pleasure Ground; and for other purposes. (Repealed by Edinburgh Corporation Order Confirmation Act 1933 (24 & 25 Geo. 5. c. v))
Halesowen Railway Act 1876	39 & 40 Vict. c. cxxxi	13 July 1876
An Act to confer further powers on the Halesowen and Bromsgrove Branch Railways Company; and for other purposes.
Horncastle Gas Act 1876	39 & 40 Vict. c. cxxxii	13 July 1876
An Act for better supplying with Gas the parish or township of Horncastle, in the county of Lincoln.
London and North Western Railway (Sirhowy Railway Vesting) Act 1876	39 & 40 Vict. c. cxxxiii	13 July 1876
An Act for vesting in the London and North-western Railway Company the Undertaking of the Sirhowy Railway Company.
North British Railway (Additional Powers) Act 1876	39 & 40 Vict. c. cxxxiv	13 July 1876
An Act to authorise the North British Railway Company to make a Railway to connect their Edinburgh and Glasgow Line, and Glasgow, Dumbarton, and Helensburgh Branch, also a Sea Wall at Burntisland, and other Works, in the counties of Edinburgh and Lanark; to acquire additional Lands; to stop up certain Streets in Glasgow; to abandon parts of the Undertaking authorised by "The North British Railway Act, 1873;" (Note: North British Railway Act 1873 (36 & 37 Vict. c. ccix)) to extend the Time for purchase of Land and completing other Railways, and for the sale of superfluous Lands; to confirm an Agreement between the Leith Harbour and Dock Commissioners and the Company; to amalgamate with the Company the Peebles, Penicuick, and Berwickshire Railway Companies; to authorise the Company to subscribe to the Edinburgh, Loanhead, and Roslin Railway Company; to confer various Powers upon the Company with respect to their Capital and Borrowing Powers; and for other purposes.
North British Railway (Fife Railways) Act 1876	39 & 40 Vict. c. cxxxv	13 July 1876
An Act to authorise the North British Railway Company to make certain Railways and Works in Fifeshire, and to provide for the vesting of one of such Railways in the Forth Bridge Railway Company with working powers to the North British Railway Company; to provide for the construction of certain portions of the Forth Bridge Undertaking; to reduce the Capital and borrowing powers of the Dunfermline and Queensferry Railway Company; and for other purposes.
Southampton Gas Act 1876	39 & 40 Vict. c. cxxxvi	13 July 1876
An Act to extend the limits of supply of the Southampton Gaslight and Coke Company, and to enable them to raise additional Capital.
Gorsedda Junction and Portmadoc Railways Act 1876	39 & 40 Vict. c. cxxxvii	13 July 1876
An Act to enable the Gorsedda Junction and Portmadoc Railways Company to maintain two existing diverted portions of Railway in the Parishes of Ynyscynhaiarn and Llanfihangel y Pennant, in the county of Carnarvon, and to make a Siding in the said parish of Ynyscynhaiarn; and to raise further capital; and for other purposes.
Stonehouse Pool Improvement Act 1876	39 & 40 Vict. c. cxxxviii	13 July 1876
An Act for incorporating a Company and authorising them to make and maintain a Quay Wall or Embankment on the Shore of Stonehouse Pool, in the county of Devon, and other Works for the Improvement of Stonehouse Pool, and a short Line of Railway to connect the Quay and Works with the Devon and Cornwall Railway; and for other purposes.
Burntisland Burgh Act 1876	39 & 40 Vict. c. cxxxix	13 July 1876
An Act for extending the Boundaries of the Burgh of Burntisland for Municipal and Police Purposes; for transferring to and vesting in the Corporation the Undertaking by means of which the Burgh is at present supplied with Water; for empowering the Corporation to construct additional Waterworks, and to supply Water to the extended Burgh and places adjacent; and for other purposes.
Colney Hatch Gas Act 1876	39 & 40 Vict. c. cxl	13 July 1876
An Act to empower the Colney Hatch Gas Company to raise additional Capital; and for other purposes.
Golden Valley Railway Act 1876	39 & 40 Vict. c. cxli	13 July 1876
An Act to incorporate a Company for making a Railway in the county of Hereford from the Great Western Railway at Pontrilas to Dorstone; and for other purposes.
Great Southern and Western Railway Act 1876	39 & 40 Vict. c. cxlii	13 July 1876
An Act for enabling the Great Southern and Western Railway Company to construct a new Road or Street at Cork; to acquire additional Lands; to raise additional Capital; and for other purposes.
Great Western Railway Act 1876	39 & 40 Vict. c. cxliii	13 July 1876
An Act for conferring further Powers on the Great Western Railway Company in relation to their own Undertaking and the Undertakings of other Companies; and for other purposes.
London, Brighton, and South Coast Railway (Various Powers) Act 1876	39 & 40 Vict. c. cxliv	13 July 1876
An Act for conferring further powers on the London, Brighton, and South Coast Railway Company.
Midland Railway (New Works, &c.) Act 1876	39 & 40 Vict. c. cxlv	13 July 1876
An Act for enabling the Midland Railway Company to construct New Railways and other Works; to acquire additional Lands; to raise further Capital; and for other purposes.
Lynn and Fakenham Railway Act 1876	39 & 40 Vict. c. cxlvi	13 July 1876
An Act to authorise the construction of Railways between King's Lynn and Fakenham, in the county of Norfolk; and for other purposes connected with the said Undertaking.
Queenborough Harbour Act 1876	39 & 40 Vict. c. cxlvii	13 July 1876
An Act to enable the Corporation of Queenborough to lay down or erect Buoys and Lights; to place Moorings; to regulate the use and navigation of West Swale; to regulate tolls, dues, and duties; to borrow money; and for other purposes.
Tipton Local Board (Gas) Act 1876	39 & 40 Vict. c. cxlviii	13 July 1876
An Act to enable the Local Board for the district of Tipton, in the county of Stafford, to purchase from the Corporation of Birmingham so much of the Gas Undertaking acquired by them as is situate in the parish of Tipton, and to light with Gas the said Parish; and for other purposes.
West Bromwich Improvement (Gas) Act 1876	39 & 40 Vict. c. cxlix	13 July 1876
An Act to enable the West Bromwich Improvement Commissioners to purchase from the Corporation of Birmingham so much of the Gas Undertaking acquired by them as is situate in the parish of West Bromwich, in the county of Stafford, and to light with Gas the said parish; and for other purposes.
Tramways Orders Confirmation (Bristol &c.) Act 1876	39 & 40 Vict. c. cl	24 July 1876
An Act for confirming certain Provisional Orders made by the Board of Trade under The Tramways Act, 1870, relating to Bristol Tramways, Corsham Tramways, Landport, Southsea, and Portsea Tramways, Shepherd's Bush and Priory Road Acton Tramway, and Southport Tramways.
	Bristol Tramways (Extension) Order 1876	
	Corsham Tramways Order 1876	
	Landport, Southsea and Portsea Street Tramways Order 1876	
	Shepherd's Bush and Priory Road Acton Tramway Order 1876	
	Southport Tramways (Extensions) Order 1876	
Crab and Lobster Fisheries (Norfolk) Act 1876	39 & 40 Vict. c. cli	24 July 1876
An Act to preserve the Crab and Lobster Fisheries on the Coast of Norfolk.
County of Peebles Justiciary District (Scotland) Act 1876 (repealed)	39 & 40 Vict. c. clii	24 July 1876
An Act to alter the Justiciary District of the County of Peebles. (Repealed by Statute Law (Repeals) Act 1993 (c. 50))
Education Department Provisional Orders Confirmation (Hailsham, &c.) Act 1876	39 & 40 Vict. c. cliii	24 July 1876
An Act to confirm certain Provisional Orders made by the Education Department under "The Elementary Education Act, 1870," (Note: Elementary Education Act 1870 (33 & 34 Vict. c. 75)) to enable the School Boards for Hailsham, Ilchester, Ingham, Slaugham, Swansea (United District), and Swansea Parish, Higher and Lower, to put in force "The Lands Clauses Consolidation Act, 1845," (Note: Lands Clauses Consolidation Act 1845 (8 & 9 Vict. c. 18)) and the Acts amending the same.
	Hailsham Order 1876	
	Ilchester Order 1876	
	Ingham Order 1876	
	Slaugham Order 1876	
	Swansea (United District) Order 1876	
	Swansea Parish Order 1876	
Education Department Provisional Order Confirmation (Hornsey) Act 1876	39 & 40 Vict. c. cliv	24 July 1876
An Act to confirm a Provisional Order made by the Education Department under "The Elementary Education Act, 1870," to enable the School Board for Hornsey to put in force "The Lands Clauses Consolidation Act, 1845," and the Acts amending the same.
	Hornsey Order 1876	
Local Government Board (Ireland) Provisional Orders (Dalkey &c.) Confirmation Act 1876	39 & 40 Vict. c. clv	24 July 1876
An Act for confirming certain Provisional Orders of the Local Government Board for Ireland, relating to the Township of Dalkey, the Galway Union, the City of Londonderry, the Newtownards United Burial Grounds District, the Omagh Waterworks, and to the Wexford Waterworks.
	Dalkey Township Provisional Order 1876	
	Galway Burial Grounds Provisional Order 1876	
	Londonderry Provisional Order 1876	
	Newtownards United Burial Grounds Provisional Order 1876	
	Omagh Waterworks Order 1876	
	Wexford Waterworks Order 1876	
Metropolitan Commons Supplemental Act 1876	39 & 40 Vict. c. clvi	24 July 1876
An Act to confirm a Scheme under the Metropolitan Commons Act, 1866, (Note: Metropolitan Commons Act 1866 (29 & 30 Vict. c. 122)) and the Metropolitan Commons Amendment Act, 1869, (Note: Metropolitan Commons Amendment Act 1869 (32 & 33 Vict. c. 107)) relating to Barnes Common.
	Barnes Common Scheme.	
General Police and Improvement (Scotland) Act 1862 Order Confirmation (Paisley) Act 1876	39 & 40 Vict. c. clvii	24 July 1876
An Act to confirm a Provisional Order under "The General Police and Improvement (Scotland) Act, 1862," (Note: General Police and Improvement (Scotland) Act 1862 (25 & 26 Vict. c. 101)) relating to the Burgh of Paisley.
	Paisley Order 1876	
General Police and Improvement (Scotland) Act 1862 Order Confirmation (Perth) Act 1876	39 & 40 Vict. c. clviii	24 July 1876
An Act to confirm a Provisional Order under "The General Police and Improvement (Scotland) Act, 1862," relating to the Burgh of Perth.
	Perth Order 1876	
Public Health (Scotland) Act 1867 Order Confirmation (Irvine and Dundonald) Act 1876 (repealed)	39 & 40 Vict. c. clix	24 July 1876
An Act to confirm a Provisional Order made under the "Public Health (Scotland) Act, 1867," relating to the burgh of Irvine and parish of Dundonald, in the county of Ayr. (Repealed by Irvine and District Water Board Order 1961 (SI 1961/872))
Elementary Education Provisional Order Confirmation (Tolleshunt Major) Act 1876	39 & 40 Vict. c. clx	24 July 1876
An Act to confirm a Provisional Order made by the Education Department under "The Elementary Education Act, 1870," to enable the School Board for Tolleshunt Major, in the county of Essex, to put in force "The Lands Clauses Consolidation Act, 1845," and the Acts amending the same.
	Tolleshunt Major Order 1876	
Local Government Board's Provisional Orders Confirmation (Carnarvon, &c.) Act 1876	39 & 40 Vict. c. clxi	24 July 1876
An Act to confirm certain Provisional Orders of the Local Government Board relating to the Borough of Carnarvon, and the Districts of Long Eaton, Saint Neots, Shepton Mallet, Tenbury Wells, Tunbridge Wells, Walton-on-the-Naze, Withington, and Whitwood.
	Carnarvon Order 1876	
	Long Eaton Order 1876	
	St. Neots Order 1876	
	Shepton Mallet Order 1876	
	Tenbury Wells Order 1876	
	Tunbridge Wells Order 1876	
	Walton-on-the-Naze Order 1876	
	Withington Order 1876	
	Whitwood Order 1876	
Local Government Board (Ireland) Provisional Orders (Coleraine, &c. Waterworks) Confirmation Act 1876	39 & 40 Vict. c. clxii	24 July 1876
An Act for confirming certain Provisional Orders of the Local Government Board for Ireland relating to Waterworks in the Towns of Coleraine, Dungannon, Keady, Portrush, and Waterford.
	Coleraine Waterworks Provisional Order 1876	
	Dungannon Waterworks Provisional Order 1876	
	Keady Waterworks Provisional Order 1876	
	Portrush Waterworks Provisional Order 1876	
	Waterford Waterworks Provisional Order 1876	
General Police and Improvement (Scotland) Act 1862 Order Confirmation (Lerwick) Act 1876	39 & 40 Vict. c. clxiii	24 July 1876
An Act to confirm a Provisional Order under "The General Police and Improvement (Scotland) Act, 1862," relating to the Burgh of Lerwick.
	Lerwick Order 1876	
Greencastle and Kilkeel Railway and Pier Act 1876	39 & 40 Vict. c. clxiv	24 July 1876
An Act for making a Railway from Greencastle to Kilkeel, with a Branch to Kilkeel Harbour, and a Pier at Greencastle, in the County of Down.
Belfast, Holywood, and Bangor Railway Act 1876	39 & 40 Vict. c. clxv	24 July 1876
An Act for the Arrangement of the Affairs of the Belfast, Holywood, and Bangor Railway Company.
Westerham Valley Railway Act 1876	39 & 40 Vict. c. clxvi	24 July 1876
An Act to authorise the Construction of a Railway from Dunton Green to Westerham, both in the County of Kent, and for other purposes connected with the said Railway.
Campbeltown Burgh and Harbour Act 1876	39 & 40 Vict. c. clxvii	24 July 1876
An Act to provide for the Local Government of the Royal and Parliamentary Burgh of Campbeltown, in the County of Argyll, for the Improvement of the Harbour thereof, and for supplying Gas and Water to the Burgh; and for other purposes.
Charnwood Forest Railway Act 1876	39 & 40 Vict. c. clxviii	24 July 1876
An Act to authorise the Charnwood Forest Railway Company to make Branch Railways near Coalville; and for other purposes.
Dunfermline Water Act 1876	39 & 40 Vict. c. clxix	24 July 1876
An Act for providing an additional supply of Water to the Burgh of Dunfermline and places adjacent; and for other purposes.
Lancashire and Yorkshire Railway Act 1876	39 & 40 Vict. c. clxx	24 July 1876
An Act for conferring further powers on the Lancashire and Yorkshire Railway Company with relation to their Undertaking.
Smethwick Local Board (Gas) Act 1876	39 & 40 Vict. c. clxxi	24 July 1876
An Act to authorise the Smethwick Local Board of Health to manufacture and supply Gas within their District; and for other purposes.
Anglesey Central Railway (Transfer) Act 1876	39 & 40 Vict. c. clxxii	24 July 1876
An Act to transfer the undertaking of the Anglesey Central Railway Company to the London and North-western Railway Company; to provide for winding-up the affairs of the Anglesey Central Railway Company; and for other purposes.
Leven Harbour Act 1876	39 & 40 Vict. c. clxxiii	24 July 1876
An Act for the improvement of the Harbour of Leven, and to authorise the construction of a Wet Dock and other Works; and for other purposes.
Peterhead Harbours Amendment Act 1876 (repealed)	39 & 40 Vict. c. clxxiv	24 July 1876
An Act to amend "The Peterhead Harbours Acts, 1873;" to confer further powers upon the Trustees of the Harbours of Peterhead; and for other purposes. (Repealed by Peterhead Harbours Order Confirmation Act 1992 (c. xii))
Scarborough Harbour Act 1876	39 & 40 Vict. c. clxxv	24 July 1876
An Act for granting further powers to the Commissioners acting in execution of the Act relating to Scarborough Harbour; to alter the rates leviable under that Act; and for other purposes.
Sevenoaks Gas Act 1876	39 & 40 Vict. c. clxxvi	24 July 1876
An Act for dissolving the Sevenoaks Gas Company, Limited, for reincorporating the Proprietors therein with others, and for conferring on the Company so to be incorporated powers to supply Gas to the parish of Sevenoaks and certain neighbouring parishes and places in the county of Kent; and for other purposes.
Waterford and Wexford Railway Act 1876	39 & 40 Vict. c. clxxvii	24 July 1876
An Act to extend the time for making the Waterford and Wexford Railway; and for other purposes in relation thereto.
Saint Werburgh's Church (Bristol) Act 1876	39 & 40 Vict. c. clxxviii	24 July 1876
An Act to provide for the uniting the Parish of Saint Werburgh in the City of Bristol to the adjoining Parish of All Saints, and for the removing the Parish Church of Saint Werburgh and the re-erecting the same in a new Parish to be formed in the said City; and for other purposes.
Kirkcaldy Burgh and Harbour Act 1876 (repealed)	39 & 40 Vict. c. clxxix	24 July 1876
An Act for extending the Municipal and Police Boundaries of the Burgh of Kirkcaldy; for empowering the Corporation to purchase the Undertaking of the Kirkcaldy Gaslight Company, and to supply Gas; for extending the compulsory limits of Water Supply; and for other purposes. (Repealed by Kirkcaldy Corporation Order Confirmation Act 1939 (2 & 3 Geo. 6. c. vi))
London and North Western Railway (New Lines and Additional Powers) Act 1876	39 & 40 Vict. c. clxxx	24 July 1876
An Act for conferring additional powers on the London and North-western Railway Company in relation to their own Undertaking and the Undertakings of other Companies; and for other purposes.
Manchester, Sheffield, and Lincolnshire Railway Act 1876	39 & 40 Vict. c. clxxxi	24 July 1876
An Act for authorising the Manchester, Sheffield, and Lincolnshire Railway Company to make new Branch Railways and other works; for conferring upon them additional powers; and for other purposes.
Romford Canal Act 1876	39 & 40 Vict. c. clxxxii	24 July 1876
An Act to enable the Romford Canal Company to raise additional Capital.
Tunbridge Wells Gas Act 1876	39 & 40 Vict. c. clxxxiii	24 July 1876
An Act to authorise the Tunbridge Wells Gas Company to acquire a new Site for the erection of Gas Works, and to confer further powers upon that Company; and for other purposes.
Didcot, Newbury and Southampton Junction Railway Act 1876	39 & 40 Vict. c. clxxxiv	24 July 1876
An Act to authorise an Extension of Time to the Didcot, Newbury, and Southampton Junction Railway Company for purchasing Land and completing their Railway; and for other purposes.
Dewsbury and Heckmondwike Waterworks Act 1876	39 & 40 Vict. c. clxxxv	24 July 1876
An Act to consolidate and amend the Acts relating to the Dewsbury and Heckmondwike Waterworks, and to authorise the construction of new works; and for other purposes.
Lancaster Water and Improvement Act 1876	39 & 40 Vict. c. clxxxvi	24 July 1876
An Act for enabling the Corporation of the Borough of Lancaster to extend their Waterworks and to make Street Improvements; and for other purposes.
South Hants Water Act 1876	39 & 40 Vict. c. clxxxvii	24 July 1876
An Act for incorporating the South Hants Waterworks Company; and for other purposes.
Swansea Harbour Act 1876	39 & 40 Vict. c. clxxxviii	24 July 1876
An Act to confirm Agreements between the Swansea Harbour Trustees and the Corporation of Swansea, the Great Western and the Midland Railway Companies, for the leasing to that Corporation and to those Companies of Wharves and other accommodation at the Docks authorised to be constructed by the Swansea Harbour Act, 1874; (Note: Swansea Harbour Act 1874 (37 & 38 Vict. c. civ)) and for other purposes.
Southwold Railway Act 1876	39 & 40 Vict. c. clxxxix	24 July 1876
An Act for making a Railway from Halesworth to Southwold, with Branches therefrom, all in the County of Suffolk.
Blackrod Gas Act 1876 (repealed)	39 & 40 Vict. c. cxc	24 July 1876
An Act for dissolving the Blackrod Gas Company, Limited, for re-incorporating the proprietors therein with others, and for conferring powers on the Company so to be incorporated to supply Gas to the township of Blackrod and certain neighbouring townships and places in the county of Lancaster; and for other purposes. (Repealed by Chorley Gas Order 1938 (SR&O 1938/701))
Oldbury Local Board of Health Act 1876 (repealed)	39 & 40 Vict. c. cxci	24 July 1876
An Act to enable the Oldbury Local Board of Health to purchase from the Corporation of Birmingham so much of the Gas Undertaking belonging to them as is situate in the district of Oldbury in the county of Worcester, and to light with Gas the said district; and for other purposes. (Repealed by West Midlands County Council Act 1980 (c. xi))
Newcastle and Gateshead Waterworks Act 1876	39 & 40 Vict. c. cxcii	24 July 1876
An Act to enable the Newcastle and Gateshead Water Company to construct additional works and raise additional capital; and for other purposes.
Enniskillen and Bundoran Extension Railway Act 1876 (repealed)	39 & 40 Vict. c. cxciii	24 July 1876
An Act for making Railways in the Counties of Donegal, Leitrim, and Sligo, to be called the Enniskillen and Bundoran Extension and Branch Railways; and for other purposes. (Repealed by Enniskillen and Bundoran Extension Railway (Abandonment) Act 1879 (42 & 43 Vict. c. ccxxiv))
Great Northern Railway Act 1876	39 & 40 Vict. c. cxciv	24 July 1876
An Act to grant further powers to the Great Northern Railway Company with relation to their Undertaking.
Llynvi and Ogmore and Cardiff and Ogmore Valley Railway Companies Act 1876	39 & 40 Vict. c. cxcv	24 July 1876
An Act for the amalgamation of the Cardiff and Ogmore Valley Railway Company with the Llynvi and Ogmore Railway Company; and for other purposes.
Stafford Corporation Act 1876	39 & 40 Vict. c. cxcvi	24 July 1876
An Act for extending the boundaries of the borough of Stafford, in the county of Stafford, and for empowering the Mayor, Aldermen, and Burgesses of the borough to construct Waterworks, and to acquire the undertaking of the Stafford Gas Company, and to execute other improvements; and for other purposes.
Education Department Provisional Order Confirmation (Cardiff) Act 1876	39 & 40 Vict. c. cxcvii	11 August 1876
An Act to confirm a Provisional Order made by the Education Department under "The Elementary Education Act, 1870," to enable the School Board for Cardiff to put in force "The Lands Clauses Consolidation Act, 1845," and the Acts amending the same.
	Cardiff Order 1876	
Local Government Board's Provisional Orders Confirmation (Bingley, &c.) Act 1876	39 & 40 Vict. c. cxcviii	11 August 1876
An Act to confirm certain Provisional Orders of the Local Government Board relating to the Improvement Act District of Bingley (two), the Borough of Brighton, the Districts of Chatham and Gillingham, the Special Drainage District of Norton, the District of North Bierley, the Borough of Nottingham, the Improvement Act District of Ramsgate, the Borough of Stoke-upon-Trent (two), and the Rural Sanitary District of the Ulverstone Union.
	Bingley (No. 1) Order 1876	
	Bingley (No. 2) Order 1876	
	Brighton Order 1876	
	Chatham Order 1876	
	Gillingham Order 1876	
	Norton Order 1876	
	North Bierley Order 1876	
	Nottingham Order 1876	
	Ramsgate Order 1876	
	Stoke-upon-Trent (No. 1) Order 1876	
	Stoke-upon-Trent (No. 2) Order 1876	
	Ulverstone Order 1876	
Local Government Board's Provisional Orders Confirmation (Chelmsford, &c.) Act 1876	39 & 40 Vict. c. cxcix	11 August 1876
An Act to confirm certain Provisional Orders of the Local Government Board relating to the Districts of Chelmsford and Merthyr Tydvil, and the Borough of Peterborough (two).
	Chelmsford Order 1876	
	Merthyr Tydfil Order 1876	
	Peterborough (No. 1) Order 1876	
	Peterborough (No. 2) Order 1876	
Metropolis (Whitechapel and Limehouse) Improvement Scheme Confirmation Act 1876	39 & 40 Vict. c. cc	11 August 1876
An Act to confirm a Provisional Order of one of Her Majesty's Principal Secretaries of State for the improvement of an unhealthy area in the Whitechapel District, and an unhealthy area in the Limehouse District, within the Metropolis.
	Whitechapel and Limehouse Order 1876	
Local Government Board's Provisional Orders Confirmation (Bath, &c.) Act 1876	39 & 40 Vict. c. cci	11 August 1876
An Act to confirm certain Provisional Orders of the Local Government Board relating to the Boroughs of Bath and Birmingham, the District of Brentford, the Special Drainage District of Burgess Hill, the Rural Sanitary District of the Caistor Union, the District of Castleford, the Boroughs of Guildford, Hanley, Liverpool, Rochester, and Warwick, and the District of Worthing.
	Bath Order 1876	
	Birmingham Order 1876	
	Brentford Order 1876	
	Burgess Hill Order 1876	
	Caister Union Order 1876	
	Castleford Order 1876	
	Guildford Order 1876	
	Hanley Order 1876	
	Liverpool Order 1876	
	Rochester Order 1876	
	Warwick Order 1876	
	Worthing Order 1876	
Local Government Board's Provisional Orders Confirmation (Birmingham, &c.) Act 1876	39 & 40 Vict. c. ccii	11 August 1876
An Act to confirm certain Provisional Orders of the Local Government Board relating to the Borough of Birmingham, the Rural Sanitary District of the Chesterfield Union, the Districts of Dawlish and Keswick, the Rural Sanitary District of the Leek Union, the Borough of Maidstone, the Districts of Mistley, Moss Side, and Southend, the Rural Sanitary District of the Tadcaster Union, and the Districts of Wallasey and Weston-super-Mare.
	Birmingham Order 1876	
	Chesterfield Union Order 1876	
	Dawlish Order 1876	
	Keswick Order 1876	
	Leek Union Order 1876	
	Maidstone Order 1876	
	Mistley Order 1876	
	Moss Side Order 1876	
	Southend Order 1876	
	Tadcaster Union Order 1876	
	Wallasey Order 1876	
	Weston-super-Mare Order 1876	
Local Government Board's Provisional Orders Confirmation (Bilbrough, &c.) Act 1876	39 & 40 Vict. c. cciii	11 August 1876
An Act to confirm certain Provisional Orders of the Local Government Board relating to the District of Bilbrough, the Improvement Act Districts of Bournemouth and Cirencester, the Districts of Clay Lane, Eccleshill, Felling, Nelson, and Normanton, the Improvement Act District of Runcorn, and the Districts of Stow-on-the-Wold, Sunderland, and Tormoham.
	Bilbrough Order 1876	
	Bournemouth Order 1876	
	Cirencester Order 1876	
	Clay Lane Order 1876	
	Eccleshill Order 1876	
	Felling Order 1876	
	Nelson Order 1876	
	Normanton Order 1876	
	Runcorn Order 1876	
	Stow-on-the-Wold Order 1876	
	Sunderland Order 1876	
	Tormoham Order 1876	
Tralee Savings Bank Act 1876	39 & 40 Vict. c. cciv	11 August 1876
An Act to provide for the collection and distribution of certain Assets of a former Savings Bank at Tralee.
Cleveland Waterworks Act 1876	39 & 40 Vict. c. ccv	11 August 1876
An Act for extending the limits within which the Cleveland Water Company may supply Water, and for empowering them to construct additional Works and to raise additional Capital; and for other purposes.
Goux's Patent Act 1876	39 & 40 Vict. c. ccvi	11 August 1876
An Act for rendering valid certain Letters Patent granted to Pierre Nicolas Goux for Improvements in collecting and in disinfecting Human Excreta and converting the same into Manure; also in the Apparatus or Means employed therein.
Belfast and County Down Railway Act 1876	39 & 40 Vict. c. ccvii	11 August 1876
An Act enabling the Belfast and County Down Railway Company to raise Preference Capital for the discharge of their Liabilities, and making other Provisions with relation to the same Company and their Undertaking.
Dudley and Oldbury Junction Railway Act 1876	39 & 40 Vict. c. ccviii	11 August 1876
An Act to authorise the Dudley and Oldbury Junction Railway Company to construct a New or Deviation Railway; and for other purposes.
Midland Railway (Further Powers) Act 1876	39 & 40 Vict. c. ccix	11 August 1876
An Act for conferring further powers on the Midland Railway Company in relation to their own undertaking and the undertakings of other Companies, and for raising additional capital; and for other purposes.
Sidmouth Railway Act 1876	39 & 40 Vict. c. ccx	11 August 1876
An Act for enabling the Sidmouth Railway Company to extend their Railway to Budleigh Salterton and Exmouth; and for other purposes.
New Shoreham Harbour Act 1876	39 & 40 Vict. c. ccxi	11 August 1876
An Act for enabling the Shoreham Harbour Trustees to improve their Harbour by constructing new works, and for amending the constitution of the Trust; and for other purposes.
Penarth Extension Railway Act 1876	39 & 40 Vict. c. ccxii	11 August 1876
An Act to incorporate a Company for the construction of the Penarth Extension Railway; and for other purposes.
South-western Railway (Various Powers) Act 1876	39 & 40 Vict. c. ccxiii	11 August 1876
An Act to confer further powers upon the London and South-western Railway Company in respect of their undertaking, and of the undertakings of other Companies, and to empower that Company and the London, Brighton, and South Coast Railway Company to purchase additional Lands for the purposes of the Tooting, Merton, and Wimbledon Railway; and for other purposes.
Preston Tramways Act 1876 (repealed)	39 & 40 Vict. c. ccxiv	11 August 1876
An Act to incorporate the Preston Tramways Company, to authorise the construction of Tramways in the borough of Preston and the adjacent township of Fulwood, both in the county of Lancaster; and for other purposes. (Repealed by County of Lancashire Act 1984 (c. xxi))
Bodmin and Wadebridge and Delabole Railway Act 1876 (repealed)	39 & 40 Vict. c. ccxv	11 August 1876
An Act for extending the time for the completion of the Bodmin and Wadebridge and Delabole Railway; and for other purposes. (Repealed by Bodmin and Wadebridge and Delabole Railway (Abandonment) Act 1878 (41 & 42 Vict. c. vi))
Cornwall Mineral and Bodmin and Wadebridge Junction Railway Act 1876 (repealed)	39 & 40 Vict. c. ccxvi	11 August 1876
An Act for extending the time for the completion of the Cornwall Mineral and Bodmin and Wadebridge Junction Railway; and for other purposes. (Repealed by Cornwall Mineral and Bodmin and Wadebridge Junction Railway (Abandonment) Act 1878 (41 & 42 Vict. c. vii))
Great Northern London Cemetery Act 1876 (repealed)	39 & 40 Vict. c. ccxvii	11 August 1876
An Act for authorising the Great Northern London Cemetery Company to dispose of their superfluous lands; and for other purposes. (Repealed by Great Northern London Cemetery Act 1976 (c. xxvii))
Prudential Assurance Company Act Amendment Act 1876	39 & 40 Vict. c. ccxviii	11 August 1876
An Act to amend "The Prudential Assurance Company Act, 1875." (Note: Prudential Assurance Company Act 1875 (38 & 39 Vict. c. lxxviii))
Severn Bridge and Forest of Dean Central Railway Act 1876 (repealed)	39 & 40 Vict. c. ccxix	11 August 1876
An Act to extend the time granted to the Severn Bridge and Forest of Dean Central Railway Company for the purchase of lands and completion of their Railway, and to authorise them to make another short Railway; and for other purposes. (Repealed by Severn Bridge and Forest of Dean Central Railway (Abandonment) Act 1884 (47 & 48 Vict. c. xxxiv))
West Ham Local Board of Health Act 1876 (repealed)	39 & 40 Vict. c. ccxx	11 August 1876
An Act to enable the Local Board of West Ham in the county of Essex, and the Board of Works for the District of Poplar in the county of Middlesex, to make composition with the owners, &c. of Stratford Langthorne Abbey for the maintenance and repair of bridges and roads between Bow in the county of Middlesex and Stratford in the county of Essex; and for other purposes. (Repealed by Local Law (London Borough of Newham) Order 1965 (SI 1965/509))
Monmouthshire Railway and Canal Act 1876	39 & 40 Vict. c. ccxxi	11 August 1876
An Act to grant further Powers to the Monmouthshire Railway and Canal Company; and for other purposes with reference to the Undertaking of the Company.
Wakefield Waterworks Act 1876	39 & 40 Vict. c. ccxxii	11 August 1876
An Act to authorise the Wakefield Waterworks Company to make a new Pumping Station and other works, and to raise more money; also to extend their limits of supply; and for other purposes.
Alexandra (Newport) Dock Act 1876	39 & 40 Vict. c. ccxxiii	11 August 1876
An Act to further extend the time limited for the purchase of lands for and for the completion of the Railways authorised by the Alexandra (Newport) Dock Act, 1865, (Note: Alexandra (Newport) Dock Act 1865 (28 & 29 Vict. c. ccclxxvii)) and to confer further powers upon the Company; and for other purposes.
East Norfolk Railway Act 1876	39 & 40 Vict. c. ccxxiv	11 August 1876
An Act for authorising the East Norfolk Railway Company to construct a Branch Railway to Aylsham in the county of Norfolk, and a Wharf on the River Bure, with a Branch Railway thereto; and for other purposes.
Gaslight and Coke Company Act 1876	39 & 40 Vict. c. ccxxv	11 August 1876
An Act for granting further powers to the Gaslight and Coke Company; and for other purposes.
Metropolitan Inner Circle Completion Railway Act 1876	39 & 40 Vict. c. ccxxvi	11 August 1876
An Act to extend the respective periods limited by "The Metropolitan Inner Circle Completion Act, 1874," (Note: Metropolitan Inner Circle Completion Act 1874 (37 & 38 Vict. c. cxcix)) for the compulsory purchase of lands for and for the completion of the works by that Act authorised, and to revive and extend in certain cases the powers of the Metropolitan Inner Circle Completion Railway Company for the purchase of lands under that Act, and to authorise that Company to acquire additional lands in the city of London; and for other purposes.
Newport (Monmouthshire) Improvement Act 1876	39 & 40 Vict. c. ccxxvii	11 August 1876
An Act to extend the Borough of Newport, in the county of Monmouth, and to enable the Mayor, Aldermen, and Burgesses thereof to improve Streets, and to construct a new Street, and other Works within the same, and to make further provisions for the improvement and good government of the Borough; and for other purposes.
South-eastern Railway Act 1876	39 & 40 Vict. c. ccxxviii	11 August 1876
An Act to authorise the South-eastern Railway Company to extend the Hythe and Sandgate Branch Railway to Folkestone; to widen a portion of their Charing Cross Line; to acquire additional Lands; and for other purposes.
South Metropolitan Gaslight and Coke Company's Act 1876	39 & 40 Vict. c. ccxxix	11 August 1876
An Act to grant further powers to The South Metropolitan Gaslight and Coke Company.
Stockton and Middlesbrough Corporations Waterworks Act 1876	39 & 40 Vict. c. ccxxx	11 August 1876
An Act for supplying with Water the boroughs of Stockton-on-Tees and Middlesbrough, and other places adjoining or near thereto; and for other purposes.
Wye Valley Railway Amendment Act 1876	39 & 40 Vict. c. ccxxxi	11 August 1876
An Act to enable the Wye Valley Railway Company to construct new Railways and other works; and for other purposes.
Dublin (South) City Market Act 1876	39 & 40 Vict. c. ccxxxii	11 August 1876
An Act to incorporate a Company for the establishment, maintenance, and regulation of a Market on the south side of the city of Dublin, and for facilitating the approach thereto by the alteration, diversion, and widening of existing streets adjoining or near thereto; and for other purposes.
North Dublin Street Tramways Act 1876	39 & 40 Vict. c. ccxxxiii	11 August 1876
An Act to empower the North Dublin Street Tramways Company to construct new tramways; and for other purposes.
Halifax Water and Gas Extension Act 1876	39 & 40 Vict. c. ccxxxiv	11 August 1876
An Act for enabling the Mayor, Aldermen, and Burgesses of the borough of Halifax to construct new Works in extension of their Waterworks, and for extending their Limits of Water Supply, and for authorising them to extend their Gasworks; and for other purposes.
Local Government Board's Provisional Orders Confirmation (Artizans and Labourers Dwellings) Act 1876	39 & 40 Vict. c. ccxxxv	15 August 1876
An Act to confirm certain Provisional Orders of the Local Government Board relating to the Boroughs of Birmingham, Liverpool, Nottingham, and Swansea.
	Birmingham Order 1876	
	Liverpool Order 1876	
	Nottingham Order 1876	
	Swansea Order 1876	
Ardglass Harbour Act 1876	39 & 40 Vict. c. ccxxxvi	15 August 1876
An Act for improvement of the Harbour of Ardglass, in the county of Down.
Erne Lough and River Act 1876	39 & 40 Vict. c. ccxxxvii	15 August 1876
An Act for the improvement of the Navigation of the Lough and River Erne.
Bow Street Police Court (Site) Act 1876	39 & 40 Vict. c. ccxxxviii	15 August 1876
An Act to authorise the acquisition of a Site in Bow Street for the erection of a new Police Court and Police Station and offices.
Education Department Provisional Order Confirmation (London) Act 1876	39 & 40 Vict. c. ccxxxix	15 August 1876
An Act to confirm a Provisional Order made by the Education Department under "The Elementary Education Act, 1870," to enable the School Board for London to put in force "The Lands Clauses Consolidation Act, 1845," and the Acts amending the same.
East Cornwall Mineral Railway Act 1876	39 & 40 Vict. c. ccxl	15 August 1876
An Act to authorise the East Cornwall Mineral Railway Company to extend their railway to the South Devon and Tavistock Railway and to Morwellham Quay on the River Tamar, and to alter the gauge and levels of their existing railway; and for other purposes.
Llandudno Improvement Act 1876	39 & 40 Vict. c. ccxli	15 August 1876
An Act to amend the Llandudno Improvement Act, 1854, (Note: Llandudno Improvement Act 1854 (17 & 18 Vict. c. cii)) and for other purposes.
Southern Railway Act 1876 (repealed)	39 & 40 Vict. c. ccxlii	15 August 1876
An Act for conferring further powers on the Southern Railway Company; and for other purposes. (Repealed by Statute Law (Repeals) Act 2013 (c. 2))
London, Essex, and Kent Coast Junction Railway Act 1876 (repealed)	39 & 40 Vict. c. ccxliii	15 August 1876
An Act for making Railways in the Counties of Essex and Kent to connect the London, Tilbury, and Southend Railway with the South-eastern and London, Chatham, and Dover Railways; and for other purposes. (Repealed by London, Essex, and Kent Coast Junction Railway (Abandonment) Act 1877 (40 & 41 Vict. c. ccxxxix))

=== Private acts ===
Short title	Citation	Royal assent
Long title
Tempest's Estate Act 1876	39 & 40 Vict. c. 1 Pr.	13 July 1876
An Act to enable the Trustees of the Settled Estates of Sir Charles Henry Tempest, Baronet, to raise money on mortgage for the improvement thereof; and for other purposes.
Dochfour Estate Act 1876	39 & 40 Vict. c. 2 Pr.	13 July 1876
An Act to authorise the sale of certain portions of the lands of Dochfour in the county of Inverness, being parts of the entailed estates now held by Evan Baillie of Dochfour, and to authorise the purchase of other lands to be entailed, to excamb portions of said entailed estates in the parish of Laggan for Dunain, Ness Castle, and others in the parish of Inverness; and for other purposes.
De Blonay's Naturalization Act 1876 (Note: This act was not printed by the Queen's Printer.)	39 & 40 Vict. c. 3 Pr.	27 June 1876
An Act to naturalize Roger Oswald René de Blonay, and to grant to and confer upon him all the rights, privileges, and capacities of a natural-born subject of Her Majesty the Queen.

=== Sources ===
- Chronological Table of the Statutes. 2009. Part 1. Pages 495 to 500.
- Chronological Table and Index of the Statutes, 13th Ed, 1896, vol 1, pp 481 to 486.
- Paterson (ed). The Practical Statutes of the Session 1876. Printed by Horace Cox. 1876. Google
- The Law Reports: The Public General Statutes, passed in . . . 1876. Printed for William Clowes and Sons, printers to the Incorporated Council of Law Reporting for England and Wales. 1876. Volume 11:
- The Public General Statutes. 1876.
- The Public General Acts of the United Kingdom of Great Britain and Ireland: passed in the Thirty-Ninth and Fortieth Years of . . . Victoria. Edward Bret Ince for the proprietors of the Law Journal Reports. 1876.
- The Public General Acts passed in the Thirty-Ninth and Fortieth Years of . . . Victoria. 1876.
- The Local Acts. 1876.
- The Private Acts. 1876.
- The Public General Statutes affecting Scotland, passed in the Thirty-Ninth and Fortieth Years of . . . Victoria. Printed by authority of William Blackwood and Sons. Edinburgh. 1876.
- "Notes on New Statutes" in "Magistrates' Law" (1876) 61 The Law Times 286 and 341
- (1876) 61 The Law Times 276 and 279
- "Legislation and Jurisprudence" (1876) 61 The Law Times 5, 24, 42, 65, 82, 99, 120, 155, 174, 194, 233, 253, 271 and 283
- "The Work of the Session" in "Legal News" (1876) 61 The Law Times 319 (2 September 1876)
- The Law Times. Statutes of the United Kingdom. 39 & 40 Victoria, A D 1876.
- "Law Statutes" (1876) 11 The Law Journal 565 and 612
- "The Session of 1876" (1876) 11 The Law Journal 474 (19 August 1876)
- "The Ministerial Programme" (1876) 11 The Law Journal 93
- "Law in Parliament" (1876) 11 The Law Journal 113, 122, 145, 158, 176, 195, 209, 223, 233, 289, 307, 317 and 332
- (1876) 11 The Law Journal 463, 509, 512 and 596
- "Legislation of the Year" (1876) 20 The Solicitors' Journal 893, 904, 918, 948 and 961
- "Legislation of the Week" (1876) 20 The Solicitors' Journal 300, 322, 342, 361, 378, 402, 422, 442, 460, 479, 508, 529, 551, 571, 591, 612, 646, 670, 691, 729, 770 and 790
- "Current Topics" (1876) 20 The Solicitors' Journal 269 (5 February 1876) (Index, p 982: "Legislation of the Coming Session")
- (1876) 20 The Solicitors' Journal 779
- The Solicitors Journal. The Public General Statutes: 39 & 40 Victoriae, 1876.
- "The Statutes of the Session" (1876) 40 The Justice of the Peace 561, 577 and 593
- "Statutes 39 Victoria" (1876) 40 The Justice of the Peace 425 and 489
- "Statutes 39 & 40 Victoria" (1876) 40 The Justice of the Peace 521, 553, 585, 632, 648, 664, 681 and 696
- "Legislative Intelligence" (1876) 40 The Justice of the Peace 101, 111, 121, 138, 143, 153, 159, 169, 175, 184, 191, 201, 207, 216, 223, 233, 239, 248, 280, 287, 297, 303, 312, 319, 328, 335, 345, 351, 360, 367, 383, 392, 399, 409, 415, 424, 431, 440, 447, 456, 463, 472, 479, 488, 495, 504, 511, 520, 527, 537 and 543
- (1876) 40 The Justice of the Peace 611 and 626
- (1876) 10 Irish Law Times and Solicitors' Journal 129, 365, 397, 454, 483, 487 and 493
- The Irish Law Times and Solicitors' Journal. Public General Statutes, 39° & 40° Victoriae (1876).
- Charles Ford (ed). The Solicitor's Diary, Law List, and Companion. 33rd Year. Waterlow and Sons. 1877. See digest of the statutes of the last session. Review.
- "Private Bills in Parliament" (1876) 41 The Engineer 49, 67, 85, 103, 138, 158, 177, 196, 214, 233, 276, 322 and 342
- "Private Bills in Parliament" [1876] 1 British Medical Journal 21 (1 January 1876)

== See also ==
- List of acts of the Parliament of the United Kingdom
