= Apportionment =

Fair division in law

The legal term apportionment (French: apportionement; Mediaeval Latin: apportionamentum, derived from Latin: portio, share), also called delimitation, is in general the distribution or allotment of proper shares, though may have different meanings in different contexts. Apportionment can refer to estate, the amount of compensation received by a worker and in respect of time.

This term may be employed roughly and sometimes has no technical meaning; this indicates the distribution of a benefit (e.g. salvage or damages under the Fatal Accidents Act 1846, § 2), or liability (e.g. general average contributions, or tithe rent-charge), or the incidence of a duty (e.g. obligations as to the maintenance of highways).

== In respect of estate ==
Apportionment in respect of estate may result either from the act of the parties or from the operation of law.

=== By act of the parties ===
Where a lessee is evicted from, or surrenders or forfeits possession of part of the property leased to him, he becomes liable at common law to pay only a rent apportioned to the value of the interest which he still retains. So where the person entitled to the reversion of an estate assigns part of it, the right to an apportioned part of the rent incident to the England, and in many of the British colonies. In the cases just mentioned there is apportionment in respect of estate by act of the parties.

=== By operation of law ===
Apportionment by operation of law may be brought about where by act of law a lease becomes inoperative as regards its subject-matter, or by the "act of God", as, for instance, where part of an estate is submerged by the encroachments of the sea. To the same category belongs the apportionment of rent which takes place under various statutes (e.g. the Lands Clauses Consolidation Act 1845 (8 & 9 Vict. c. 18), section 119, when land is required for public purposes; the Agricultural Holdings Act 1883 (46 & 47 Vict. c. 61), section 41, in the case of a tenant from year to year receiving notice to quit part of a holding; and the Irish Land Act 1903 (3 Edw. 7. c. 37), section 61, apportionment of quit and crown rents).

== In respect of time ==
Apportionment Act 1834 (Note: The citation of this act by this short title was authorised by section 1 of, and the first schedule to, the Short Titles Act 1896. Due to the repeal of those provisions it is now authorised by section 19(2) of the Interpretation Act 1978.)
- Act of Parliament
- Parliament of the United Kingdom
- Long title: An Act to amend an Act of the Eleventh Year of King George the Second, respecting the Apportionment of Rents, Annuities, and other periodical Payments.
- Citation: 4 & 5 Will. 4. c. 22
- Territorial extent: United Kingdom

Dates
- Royal assent: 16 June 1834
- Commencement: 16 June 1834 (Note: The Acts of Parliament (Commencement) Act 1793.)
- Repealed: 16 June 1977
Other legislation
Amends	Distress for Rent Act 1737
Repealed by	Statute Law (Repeals) Act 1977

Status: Repealed

Text of statute as originally enacted

At common law, there was no apportionment of rent in respect of time. Such apportionment was, however, in certain cases allowed in England by the Distress for Rent Act 1737 (11 Geo. 2. c. 19), and the Apportionment Act 1834 (4 & 5 Will. 4. c. 22), and is now allowed generally. Under that statute (section 2) all rents, annuities, dividends and other periodical payments in the nature of income are to be considered as accruing from day to day and to be apportionable in respect of time accordingly. It is provided, however, that the apportioned part of such rents, etc., shall only be payable or recoverable in the case of a continuing payment, when the entire portion of which it forms part itself becomes payable, and, in the case of a payment determined by re-entry, death or otherwise, only when the next entire portion would have been payable if it had not so determined (§ 3). Persons entitled to apportioned parts of rent have the same remedies for recovering them when payable as they would have had in respect of the entire rent; but a lessee is not to be liable for any apportioned part specifically. The rent is recoverable by the heir or other person who would, but for the apportionment, be entitled to the entire rent, and he holds it subject to distribution (section 4).

Apportionment Act 1870 (Note: Section 1.)
- Act of Parliament
- Parliament of the United Kingdom
- Long title: An Act for the better Apportionment of Rents and other periodical Payments.
- Citation: 33 & 34 Vict. c. 35
- Territorial extent: United Kingdom

Dates
- Royal assent: 1 August 1870
- Commencement: 1 August 1870

Status: Current legislation

Text of statute as originally enacted

Revised text of statute as amended

Text of the Apportionment Act 1870 as in force today (including any amendments) within the United Kingdom, from legislation.gov.uk.

The Apportionment Act 1870 (33 & 34 Vict. c. 35) extends to payments not made under any instrument in writing (section 2), but not to annual sums made payable in policies of insurance (section 6). Apportionment under the act can be excluded by express stipulation.

The apportionment created by this statute is "apportionment in respect of time." The cases to which it applies are mainly cases of either:

1. apportionment of rent due under leases where at a time between the dates fixed for payment the lessor or lessee dies, or some other alteration in the position of parties occurs; or
2. apportionment of income between the representatives of a limited owner and the remainder-man when the limited interest determines at a time between the date when such income became due.

=== Apportionment of rent ===
With regard to the former of these classes, it may be noticed that although apportioned rent becomes payable only when the whole rent is due, the landlord, in the case of the bankruptcy of an ordinary tenant, may prove for a proportionate part of the rent up to the date of the receiving order; and that a similar rule holds good in the winding up of a company; and further that the Apportionment Act 1870 applies to the liability to pay, as well as to the right to receive, rent. Accordingly, where an assignment of a lease is made between two half-yearly rent-days, the assignee is not liable to pay the full amount of the half-year's rent falling due on the rent-day next after the date of the assignment, but only an apportioned part of that half-year's rent, computed from the last mentioned date. If someone pays a ground rent on a leasehold property or a rentcharge on a freehold property that is also payable on other neighbouring properties, they can apply to the Department for Communities and Local Government for an 'order of apportionment' that legally separates their share of the ground rent or rentcharge.

=== Apportionment of income ===
With regard to the apportionment of income, the only points requiring notice here are that all dividends payable by public companies are apportionable, whether paid at fixed periods or not, unless the payment is, in effect, a payment of capital (§ 5).

== See also ==
- Formulary apportionment, is a method of allocating profit earned or loss incurred
- Fair division
- Entitlement (fair division)
- Proportional cake-cutting with different entitlements
