= List of acts of the Parliament of the United Kingdom from 1875 =

This is a complete list of acts of the Parliament of the United Kingdom for the year 1875.

Note that the first parliament of the United Kingdom was held in 1801; parliaments between 1707 and 1800 were either parliaments of Great Britain or of Ireland). For acts passed up until 1707, see the list of acts of the Parliament of England and the list of acts of the Parliament of Scotland. For acts passed from 1707 to 1800, see the list of acts of the Parliament of Great Britain. See also the list of acts of the Parliament of Ireland.

For acts of the devolved parliaments and assemblies in the United Kingdom, see the list of acts of the Scottish Parliament, the list of acts of the Northern Ireland Assembly, and the list of acts and measures of Senedd Cymru; see also the list of acts of the Parliament of Northern Ireland.

The number shown after each act's title is its chapter number. Acts passed before 1963 are cited using this number, preceded by the year(s) of the reign during which the relevant parliamentary session was held; thus the Union with Ireland Act 1800 is cited as "39 & 40 Geo. 3 c. 67", meaning the 67th act passed during the session that started in the 39th year of the reign of George III and which finished in the 40th year of that reign. Note that the modern convention is to use Arabic numerals in citations (thus "41 Geo. 3" rather than "41 Geo. III"). Acts of the last session of the Parliament of Great Britain and the first session of the Parliament of the United Kingdom are both cited as "41 Geo. 3".

Some of these acts have a short title. Some of these acts have never had a short title. Some of these acts have a short title given to them by later acts, such as by the Short Titles Act 1896.

== 38 & 39 Vict. ==
The second session of the 21st Parliament of the United Kingdom, which met from 5 February 1875 until 13 August 1875.

=== Public general acts ===
Short title	Citation	Royal assent
Long title
Supply Act 1875 or the Consolidated Fund Act 1875 (repealed)	38 & 39 Vict. c. 1	19 March 1875
An Act to apply the sum of eight hundred and two thousand six hundred and sixty-one pounds eight shillings and eleven pence out of the Consolidated Fund to the service of the years ending the thirty-first day of March one thousand eight hundred and seventy-four and one thousand eight hundred and seventy-five. (Repealed by Statute Law Revision Act 1883 (46 & 47 Vict. c. 39))
Supply (No. 2) Act 1875 or the Consolidated Fund Act 1875 (repealed)	38 & 39 Vict. c. 2	19 March 1875
An Act to apply the sum of seven million pounds out of the Consolidated Fund to the service of the year ending the thirty-first day of March one thousand eight hundred and seventy-six. (Repealed by Statute Law Revision Act 1883 (46 & 47 Vict. c. 39))
Metropolitan Police Magistrates Act 1875 (repealed)	38 & 39 Vict. c. 3	19 March 1875
An Act to make further provision with respect to the Salaries of the Magistrates of the Police Courts in the Metropolitan Police District. (Repealed by Judicial Offices (Salaries, &c.) Act 1952 (15 & 16 Geo. 6 & 1 Eliz. 2. c. 12))
Superannuation Act 1875 (repealed)	38 & 39 Vict. c. 4	19 March 1875
An Act to amend the Superannuation Act, 1859, (Note: Superannuation Act 1859 (22 Vict. c. 26)) so far as relates to the Superannuation Allowances to be granted to Civil Servants who have served in unhealthy Climates. (Repealed by Superannuation Act 1876 (39 & 40 Vict. c. 53))
Registry of Deeds (Ireland) Act 1875 (repealed)	38 & 39 Vict. c. 5	19 March 1875
An Act to amend the Law relating to the Registry of Deeds Office, Ireland. (Repealed by Statute Law Revision Act 1883 (46 & 47 Vict. c. 39), Statute Law Revision (No. 2) Act 1893 (56 & 57 Vict. c. 54) and Administrative and Financial Provisions Act (Northern Ireland) 1958 (c. 20 (N.I.)))
Epping Forest Act 1875 (repealed)	38 & 39 Vict. c. 6	19 March 1875
An Act to extend the Time for the Epping Forest Commissioners to make their Final Report. (Repealed by Wild Creatures and Forest Laws Act 1971 (c. 47))
Mutiny Act 1875 (repealed)	38 & 39 Vict. c. 7	22 April 1875
An Act for punishing Mutiny and Desertion, and for the better payment of the Army and their Quarters. (Repealed by Statute Law Revision Act 1883 (46 & 47 Vict. c. 39))
Marine Mutiny Act 1875 or the Royal Marines on Shore Act 1875 (repealed)	38 & 39 Vict. c. 8	22 April 1875
An Act for the Regulation of Her Majesty's Royal Marine Forces while on shore. (Repealed by Statute Law Revision Act 1883 (46 & 47 Vict. c. 39))
Building Societies Act 1875 (repealed)	38 & 39 Vict. c. 9	22 April 1875
An Act to repeal section eight of the Building Societies Act, 1874, (Note: Building Societies Act 1874 (37 & 38 Vict. c. 42)) and make other provision in lieu thereof. (Repealed for England and Wales and Scotland by Building Societies Act 1962 (10 & 11 Eliz. 2. c. 37) and for Northern Ireland by Statute Law Revision Act 1883 (46 & 47 Vict. c. 39) and Statute Law Revision Act (Northern Ireland) 1954 (c. 35 (N.I.)))
Supply (No. 3) Act 1875 or the Consolidated Fund Act 1875 (repealed)	38 & 39 Vict. c. 10	13 May 1875
An Act to apply the sum of Fifteen millions out of the Consolidated Fund to the service of the year ending the thirty-first day of March one thousand eight hundred and seventy-six. (Repealed by Statute Law Revision Act 1883 (46 & 47 Vict. c. 39))
Leasing Powers Amendment Act for Religious Purposes in Ireland 1875	38 & 39 Vict. c. 11	13 May 1875
An Act to enable limited Owners to grant or demise Lands for Glebes in Ireland.
International Copyright Act 1875 (repealed)	38 & 39 Vict. c. 12	13 May 1875
An Act to amend the Law relating to International Copyright. (Repealed by Copyright Act 1911 (1 & 2 Geo. 5. c. 46))
Holidays Extension Act 1875 (repealed)	38 & 39 Vict. c. 13	13 May 1875
An Act to extend to the Docks, Custom Houses, Inland Revenue Offices, and Bonding Warehouses in England and Ireland certain provisions of The Bank Holidays Act, 1871, (Note: Bank Holidays Act 1871 (34 & 35 Vict. c. 17)) and to amend the same. (Repealed by Banking and Financial Dealings Act 1971 (c. 80))
Peace Preservation (Ireland) Act 1875 (repealed)	38 & 39 Vict. c. 14	28 May 1875
An Act to amend and continue certain Acts for the Preservation of the Peace in Ireland, and to grant an Indemnity in certain cases. (Repealed by Statute Law Revision Act 1883 (46 & 47 Vict. c. 39))
Sea Fisheries Act 1875 (repealed)	38 & 39 Vict. c. 15	28 May 1875
An Act to amend the Sea Fisheries Act, 1868. (Note: Sea Fisheries Act 1868 (31 & 32 Vict. c. 45)) (Repealed for England and Wales and Scotland by Sea Fisheries (Shellfish) Act 1967 (c. 83) and for Northern Ireland by Sea Fisheries Act 1883 (46 & 47 Vict. c. 22), Statute Law Revision Act 1883 (46 & 47 Vict. c. 39) and Statute Law Revision Act (Northern Ireland) 1954 (c. 35 (N.I.)))
Regimental Exchange Act 1875 (repealed)	38 & 39 Vict. c. 16	28 May 1875
An Act to amend the Law relating to Regimental Exchanges. (Repealed by Statute Law (Repeals) Act 1995 (c. 44))
Explosives Act 1875	38 & 39 Vict. c. 17	14 June 1875
An Act to amend the Law with respect to manufacturing, keeping, selling, carrying, and importing Gunpowder, Nitro–glycerine, and other Explosive Substances.
Seal Fishery Act 1875 (repealed)	38 & 39 Vict. c. 18	14 June 1875
An Act to provide for the establishment of a Close Time in the Seal Fishery in the Seas adjacent to the eastern coasts of Greenland. (Repealed by Statute Law (Repeals) Act 1986 (c. 12) and Marine and Coastal Access Act 2009 (c. 23))
Bishops Resignation Act 1875 or the Bishops Resignation (1869) Perpetuation Act 1875 (repealed)	38 & 39 Vict. c. 19	14 June 1875
An Act for making perpetual the Bishops Resignation Act, 1869. (Note: Bishops Resignation Act 1869 (32 & 33 Vict. c. 111)) (Repealed by Statute Law Revision Act 1883 (46 & 47 Vict. c. 39))
Dublin Justices Act 1875 (repealed)	38 & 39 Vict. c. 20	14 June 1875
An Act to amend the Laws relating to the Justices of the Police District of Dublin Metropolis. (Repealed by Statute Law (Repeals) Act 1993 (c. 50))
Public Entertainments Act 1875 (repealed)	38 & 39 Vict. c. 21	14 June 1875
An Act for amending the Law relating to Houses of Public Dancing, Music, or other Public Entertainment of the like kind, in the Cities of London and Westminster. (Repealed by Statute Law (Repeals) Act 1973 (c. 39))
Post Office Act 1875 (repealed)	38 & 39 Vict. c. 22	14 June 1875
An Act for the further regulation of the Duties on Postage, and for other purposes relating to the Post Office. (Repealed by Post Office Act 1908 (8 Edw. 7. c. 48))
Customs and Inland Revenue Act 1875 (repealed)	38 & 39 Vict. c. 23	14 June 1875
An Act to grant certain Duties of Customs and Inland Revenue, to alter other Duties, and to amend the Laws relating to Customs and Inland Revenue. (Repealed for England and Wales and Scotland by Finance Act 1944 (7 & 8 Geo. 6. c. 23) and for Northern Ireland by Inland Revenue Act 1880 (43 & 44 Vict. c. 20), Spirits Act 1880 (43 & 44 Vict. c. 24), Statute Law Revision Act 1883 (46 & 47 Vict. c. 39), Stamp Duties Management Act 1891 (54 & 55 Vict. c. 38) and Finance (1909-10) Act 1910 (10 Edw. 7 & 1 Geo. 5. c. 8))
Falsification of Accounts Act 1875 (repealed)	38 & 39 Vict. c. 24	29 June 1875
An Act to amend the Law with reference to the Falsification of Accounts. (Repealed by Theft Act 1968 (c. 60))
Public Stores Act 1875	38 & 39 Vict. c. 25	29 June 1875
An Act to consolidate, with amendments, the Acts relating to the Protection of Public Stores.
Bankruptcy (Scotland) Act 1875 (repealed)	38 & 39 Vict. c. 26	29 June 1875
An Act to amend the Law of Bankruptcy in Scotland. (Repealed by Bankruptcy (Scotland) Act 1913 (3 & 4 Geo. 5. c. 20))
Intestates Act 1875 (repealed)	38 & 39 Vict. c. 27	29 June 1875
An Act to extend to the surviving Children of poor Widows the benefits of the Act thirty-sixth and thirty seventh Victoria, chapter fifty-two, intituled "An Act for the Relief of Widows and Children of Intestates where the personal estate is of small value." (Note: Intestates Act 1873 (36 & 37 Vict. c. 52)) (Repealed for England and Wales by County Courts (Amendment) Act 1934 (24 & 25 Geo. 5. c. 17) and for Northern Ireland by Statute Law Revision Act 1950 (14 Geo. 6. c. 6))
Metropolitan Police Staff (Superannuation) Act 1875 (repealed)	38 & 39 Vict. c. 28	29 June 1875
An Act to amend the Law respecting the Superannuation Allowances of certain Officers of the Staff of the Metropolitan Police. (Repealed by Superannuation (Miscellaneous Provisions) Act 1967 (c. 28))
Endowed Schools (Vested Interests) Act Continuance Act 1875 (repealed)	38 & 39 Vict. c. 29	29 June 1875
An Act to continue the Endowed Schools Act, 1868. (Note: Endowed Schools Act 1868 (31 & 32 Vict. c. 32)) (Repealed by Charities Act 1960 (8 & 9 Eliz. 2. c. 58))
Glebe Loan (Ireland) Amendment Act 1875 (repealed)	38 & 39 Vict. c. 30	29 June 1875
An Act to amend the Glebe Loan (Ireland) Amendment Act, 1871. (Note: Glebe Loan (Ireland) Amendment Act 1871 (34 & 35 Vict. c. 100)) (Repealed by Statute Law Revision Act 1883 (46 & 47 Vict. c. 39))
Railway Companies Act 1875 (repealed)	38 & 39 Vict. c. 31	29 June 1875
An Act to make perpetual Section Four of the Railway Companies Act, 1867, (Note: Railway Companies Act 1867 (30 & 31 Vict. c. 127)) and Section Four of the Railway Companies (Scotland) Act, 1867. (Note: Railway Companies (Scotland) Act 1867 (30 & 31 Vict. c. 126)) (Repealed by Statute Law Revision Act 1883 (46 & 47 Vict. c. 39))
Survey (Great Britain) Continuance Act 1875 (repealed)	38 & 39 Vict. c. 32	29 June 1875
An Act to continue for Ten Years the Survey (Great Britain) Acts. (Note: Ordnance Survey Act 1841 (4 & 5 Vict. c. 30)) (Note: Survey Act 1870 (33 & 34 Vict. c. 13)) (Repealed by Statute Law Revision (No. 2) Act 1893 (56 & 57 Vict. c. 54))
Metropolis Management Act 1875 (repealed)	38 & 39 Vict. c. 33	29 June 1875
An Act to amend the Metropolis Management Acts. (Repealed by London Government Act 1963 (c. 33))
Bishopric of Saint Albans Act 1875 (repealed)	38 & 39 Vict. c. 34	29 June 1875
An Act to amend the Acts relating to the Ecclesiastical Commissioners, and enable them to carry in effect a certain proposal for the re-arrangement of the Dioceses of London, Winchester, and Rochester, and the erection of a new Bishopric of Saint Albans. (Repealed by Statute Law (Repeals) Act 1973 (c. 39))
South Wales Turnpike Trusts Amendment Act 1875 (repealed)	38 & 39 Vict. c. 35	29 June 1875
An Act for the further amendment of the Laws relating to Turnpike Roads in South Wales. (Repealed by Statute Law Revision (No. 2) Act 1893 (56 & 57 Vict. c. 54))
Artisans' and Labourers' Dwellings Improvement Act 1875 or the Cross Act (repealed)	38 & 39 Vict. c. 36	29 June 1875
An Act for facilitating the Improvement of the Dwellings of the Working Classes in Large Towns. (Repealed by Housing of the Working Classes Act 1890 (53 & 54 Vict. c. 70))
Juries (Ireland) Act 1875 (repealed)	38 & 39 Vict. c. 37	29 June 1875
An Act to amend the Law relating to Juries in Ireland. (Repealed by Statute Law Revision Act 1883 (46 & 47 Vict. c. 39))
Parliament of Canada Act 1875	38 & 39 Vict. c. 38	19 July 1875
An Act to remove certain doubts with respect to the powers of the Parliament of Canada under section eighteen of the British North America Act, 1867. (Note: British North America Act 1867 (30 & 31 Vict. c. 3))
Metalliferous Mines Regulation Act 1875 (repealed)	38 & 39 Vict. c. 39	19 July 1875
An Act to amend the provisions of the Metalliferous Mines Regulation Act, 1872, (Note: Metalliferous Mines Regulation Act 1872 (35 & 36 Vict. c. 77)) with respect to the annual Returns from Mines. (Repealed for England and Wales and Scotland by Mines and Quarries Act 1954 (2 & 3 Eliz. 2. c. 70), for the Isle of Man by Isle of Man Act 1958 (6 & 7 Eliz. 2. c. 11) and for Northern Ireland by Mines Act (Northern Ireland) 1969 (c. 6 (N.I.)))
Municipal Elections Act 1875 (repealed)	38 & 39 Vict. c. 40	19 July 1875
An Act to amend the Law regulating Municipal Elections. (Repealed for England and Wales by Municipal Corporations Act 1882 (45 & 46 Vict. c. 50), for Northern Ireland by Statute Law Revision Act 1883 (46 & 47 Vict. c. 39) and Statute Law Revision (No. 2) Act 1893 (56 & 57 Vict. c. 54) and for Ireland by Local Government (Ireland) Act 1898 (61 & 62 Vict. c. 37))
Intestates Widows and Children (Scotland) Act 1875	38 & 39 Vict. c. 41	19 July 1875
An Act for the relief of Widows and Children of Intestates in Scotland where the Personal Estate is of small value.
Glebe Lands, Representative Church Body, Ireland, Act 1875	38 & 39 Vict. c. 42	19 July 1875
An Act to entitle certain Corporate Bodies to hold Land for Glebes in Ireland.
Medical Act (Royal College of Surgeons of England) 1875 (repealed)	38 & 39 Vict. c. 43	19 July 1875
An Act to amend the Medical Acts so far as relates to the Royal College of Surgeons of England. (Repealed by Statute Law (Repeals) Act 1986 (c. 12))
Constabulary (Ireland) Act 1875 (repealed)	38 & 39 Vict. c. 44	19 July 1875
An Act to amend The Constabulary (Ireland) Act, 1874. (Note: Constabulary (Ireland) Act 1874 (37 & 38 Vict. c. 80)) (Repealed by Statute Law Revision Act 1883 (46 & 47 Vict. c. 39) (Note: Incorrectly cited as "SLR, 1833" in the Chronological Table of the Statutes.))
Sinking Fund Act 1875 (repealed)	38 & 39 Vict. c. 45	2 August 1875
An Act to amend the Law with respect to the Reduction of the National Debt and the Charge for the National Debt in the Consolidated Fund. (Repealed by National Loans Act 1968 (c. 13))
Bridges (Ireland) Act 1875 (repealed)	38 & 39 Vict. c. 46	2 August 1875
An Act to amend an Act passed in the Session of Parliament held in the Thirtieth and Thirty-first Years of the Reign of Her present Majesty, intituled "An Act to afford further Facilities for the Erection of certain Bridges in Ireland." (Note: Bridges (Ireland) Act 1867 (30 & 31 Vict. c. 50)) (Repealed by Statute Law Revision (No. 2) Act 1893 (56 & 57 Vict. c. 54) and Statute Law Revision (Northern Ireland) Act 1976 (c. 12))
Constables (Scotland) Act 1875	38 & 39 Vict. c. 47	2 August 1875
An Act to amend the Law in regard to Constables and Peace Officers in Scotland.
Police (Expenses) Act 1875 (repealed)	38 & 39 Vict. c. 48	2 August 1875
An Act to make further provision respecting the contribution out of moneys provided by Parliament towards the expenses of the Police Force in the Metropolitan Police District, and elsewhere in Great Britain. (Repealed by Statute Law Revision (No. 2) Act 1893 (56 & 57 Vict. c. 54))
Artisans and Labourers Dwellings Improvement (Scotland) Act 1875 or the Artizans and Labourers Dwellings Improvement (Scotland) Act 1875 (repealed)	38 & 39 Vict. c. 49	2 August 1875
An Act for facilitating the Improvement of the Dwellings of the Working Classes in large Towns in Scotland. (Repealed by Housing of the Working Classes Act 1890 (53 & 54 Vict. c. 70))
County Courts Act 1875 (repealed)	38 & 39 Vict. c. 50	2 August 1875
An Act to amend the Acts relating to the County Courts. (Repealed by County Courts Act 1888 (51 & 52 Vict. c. 43))
Pacific Islanders Protection Act 1875 (repealed)	38 & 39 Vict. c. 51	2 August 1875
An Act to amend the Act of the Session of the thirty-fifth and thirty-sixth years of the reign of Her present Majesty, chapter nineteen, intituled "An Act for the prevention and punishment of criminal outrages upon natives of the islands in the Pacific Ocean." (Note: Pacific Islanders Protection Act 1872 (35 & 36 Vict. c. 19)) (Repealed by Statute Law (Repeals) Act 1986 (c. 12))
Washington Treaty (Claims) Act 1875 (repealed)	38 & 39 Vict. c. 52	2 August 1875
An Act to provide for the completion of the distribution of the sums of money paid to Her Majesty by the United States of America on account of Awards made by the Commissioners acting under a certain Treaty between Her Majesty and the United States of America. (Repealed by Statute Law (Repeals) Act 1977 (c. 18))
Canada Copyright Act 1875 (repealed)	38 & 39 Vict. c. 53	2 August 1875
An Act to give effect to an Act of the Parliament of the Dominion of Canada respecting Copyright. (Repealed by Statute Law (Repeals) Act 1973 (c. 39))
Justices Qualification Act 1875 (repealed)	38 & 39 Vict. c. 54	2 August 1875
An Act to amend the Qualification required by Persons acting as Justices of the Peace. (Repealed by Justices of the Peace Act 1906 (6 Edw. 7. c. 16))
Public Health Act 1875	38 & 39 Vict. c. 55	11 August 1875
An Act for consolidating and amending the Acts relating to Public Health in England.
County Surveyors Superannuation Act (Ireland) 1875 or the County Surveyors (Superannuation) Ireland Act 1875	38 & 39 Vict. c. 56	11 August 1875
An Act to enable Grand Juries in Ireland to grant Superannuation Allowances to County Surveyors in certain cases.
Pharmacy Act (Ireland) 1875 or the Pharmacy (Ireland) Act 1875 (repealed)	38 & 39 Vict. c. 57	11 August 1875
An Act to institute a Pharmaceutical Society, and to regulate the Qualifications of Pharmaceutical Chemists and of Chemists and Druggists, in Ireland. (Repealed by Statute Law Revision Act 1883 (46 & 47 Vict. c. 39), Pharmacy Act (Ireland) 1875 Amendment Act 1890 (53 & 54 Vict. c. 48), Statute Law Revision Act 1894 (57 & 58 Vict. c. 56) and Statute Law Revision Act (Northern Ireland) 1954 (c. 35 (N.I.)))
Public Works Loans (Money) Act 1875 (repealed)	38 & 39 Vict. c. 58	11 August 1875
An Act to authorise Advances to the Public Works Loan Commissioners for enabling them to make Loans under divers Acts authorising such Loans. (Repealed for England and Wales and Scotland by National Loans Act 1968 (c. 13) and for Northern Ireland by Statute Law Revision Act 1883 (46 & 47 Vict. c. 39), Statute Law Revision (No. 2) Act 1893 (56 & 57 Vict. c. 54) and Public Works &c Loans Act (Northern Ireland) 1953 (c. 13 (N.I.)))
Public Records (Ireland) Act 1867 Amendment Act 1875	38 & 39 Vict. c. 59	11 August 1875
An Act to amend the Public Records (Ireland) Act, 1867, (Note: Public Records (Ireland) Act 1867 (30 & 31 Vict. c. 70)) and to make provision for keeping safely Parochial Records in Ireland.
Friendly Societies Act 1875 (repealed)	38 & 39 Vict. c. 60	11 August 1875
An Act to consolidate and amend the Law relating to Friendly and other Societies. (Repealed by Collecting Societies and Industrial Assurance Companies Act 1896 (59 & 60 Vict. c. 26))
Entail Amendment (Scotland) Act 1875 (repealed)	38 & 39 Vict. c. 61	11 August 1875
An Act to further amend the Law of Entail in Scotland. (Repealed by Abolition of Feudal Tenure etc. (Scotland) Act 2000 (asp 5))
Summary Prosecutions Appeals (Scotland) Act 1875 (repealed)	38 & 39 Vict. c. 62	11 August 1875
An Act to alter and amend the Law relating to Appeals in Summary Prosecutions before Inferior Judges in Scotland. (Repealed by Summary Jurisdiction (Scotland) Act 1908 (8 Edw. 7. c. 65))
Sale of Food and Drugs Act 1875 (repealed)	38 & 39 Vict. c. 63	11 August 1875
An Act to repeal the Adulteration of Food Acts, and to make better provision for the Sale of Food and Drugs in a pure state. (Repealed for England and Wales and Scotland by Statute Law Revision (No. 2) Act 1893 (56 & 57 Vict. c. 54), Food and Drugs (Adulteration) Act 1928 (18 & 19 Geo. 5. c. 31), Customs and Excise Act 1952 (15 & 16 Geo. 6 & 1 Eliz. 2. c. 44) and Statute Law Revision Act 1953 (2 & 3 Eliz. 2. c. 5) and for Northern Ireland by Food and Drugs Act (Northern Ireland) 1958 (c. 27 (N.I.)))
Government Officers (Security) Act 1875 (repealed)	38 & 39 Vict. c. 64	11 August 1875
An Act to repeal the Guarantee by Companies Act, 1867, (Note: Guarantee by Companies Act 1867 (30 & 31 Vict. c. 108)) and to make other provision in lieu thereof. (Repealed by Statute Law (Repeals) Act 1974 (c. 22))
Metropolitan Board of Works (Loans) Act 1875 (repealed)	38 & 39 Vict. c. 65	11 August 1875
An Act for further amending the Acts relating to the raising of Money by the Metropolitan Board of Works, and for other purposes. (Repealed by London County Council (Finance Consolidation) Act 1912 (2 & 3 Geo. 5. c. cv))
Statute Law Revision Act 1875	38 & 39 Vict. c. 66	11 August 1875
An Act for further promoting the Revision of the Statute Law by repealing certain Enactments which have ceased to be in force or have become unnecessary.
Lunatic Asylums (Ireland) Act 1875 (repealed)	38 & 39 Vict. c. 67	2 August 1875
An Act to amend the Laws relating to Private and District Lunatic Asylums in Ireland. (Repealed by Statute Law Revision Act 1883 (46 & 47 Vict. c. 39), Statute Law Revision (No. 2) Act 1893 (56 & 57 Vict. c. 54), Mental Treatment Act (Northern Ireland) 1932 (22 & 23 Geo. 5. c. 15 (N.I.)), Health Services Act (Northern Ireland) 1948 (c. 3 (N.I.)), Statute Law Revision Act (Northern Ireland) 1954 (c. 35 (N.I.)) and Mental Health Act (Northern Ireland) 1961 (c. 15 (N.I.)))
Department of Science and Art Act 1875 (repealed)	38 & 39 Vict. c. 68	11 August 1875
An Act for making further Provision respecting the Department of Science and Art. (Repealed for England and Wales by Charities Act 1960 (8 & 9 Eliz. 2. c. 58) and for Northern Ireland by Education (Amendment) (Northern Ireland) Act 1951 (c. 10 (N.I.)))
Militia (Voluntary Enlistment) Act 1875 (repealed)	38 & 39 Vict. c. 69	11 August 1875
An Act to consolidate and amend certain Laws relating to the Militia of the United Kingdom. (Repealed by Militia Act 1882 (45 & 46 Vict. c. 49))
Chimney Sweepers Act 1875 (repealed)	38 & 39 Vict. c. 70	11 August 1875
An Act for further amending the Law relating to Chimney Sweepers. (Repealed for England and Wales by Chimney Sweepers Acts (Repeal) Act 1938 (1 & 2 Geo. 6. c. 58) and for Northern Ireland by Statute Law (Repeals) Act 1971 (c. 52))
Ecclesiastical Commissioners Act 1875 (repealed)	38 & 39 Vict. c. 71	11 August 1875
An Act to amend the Act of the twenty-ninth and thirtieth years of Her Majesty, chapter one hundred and eleven, (Note: Ecclesiastical Commissioners Act 1866 (29 & 30 Vict. c. 111)) relating to the Ecclesiastical Commissioners for England. (Repealed by Statute Law Revision Act 1959 (7 & 8 Eliz. 2. c. 68))
Expiring Laws Continuance Act 1875 (repealed)	38 & 39 Vict. c. 72	11 August 1875
An Act to continue various expiring Laws. (Repealed by Statute Law Revision Act 1883 (46 & 47 Vict. c. 39))
India Home (Appointments) Act 1875 or the East India Home Government (Appointments) Act 1875 (repealed)	38 & 39 Vict. c. 73	11 August 1875
An Act to amend the law relating to the appointment of certain persons who entered the employment of the Home Government of India before the thirty-first day of December one thousand eight hundred and seventy-four. (Repealed by Statute Law Revision Act 1883 (46 & 47 Vict. c. 39))
Public Health (Scotland) Act 1867 Amendment Act 1875 (repealed)	38 & 39 Vict. c. 74	11 August 1875
An Act to amend "The Public Health (Scotland) Act, 1867," (Note: Public Health (Scotland) Act 1867 (30 & 31 Vict. c. 101)) and other Sanitary Acts, in respect of Loans for Sanitary Purposes. (Repealed by Public Health (Scotland) Act 1897 (60 & 61 Vict. c. 38))
Contagious Diseases (Animals) (Scotland) Act 1875 (repealed)	38 & 39 Vict. c. 75	11 August 1875
An Act to amend the Contagious Diseases (Animals) Act, 1869. (Note: Contagious Diseases (Animals) Act 1869 (32 & 33 Vict. c. 70)) (Repealed by Contagious Diseases (Animals) Act 1878 (41 & 42 Vict. c. 74))
Ecclesiastical Fees Act 1875 (repealed)	38 & 39 Vict. c. 76	11 August 1875
An Act to make provision for Returns relating to Ecclesiastical Fees, and for other purposes. (Repealed by Statute Law Revision Act 1959 (7 & 8 Eliz. 2. c. 68))
Supreme Court of Judicature Act 1875 (repealed)	38 & 39 Vict. c. 77	11 August 1875
An Act to amend and extend the Supreme Court of Judicature Act, 1873. (Note: Supreme Court of Judicature Act 1873 (36 & 37 Vict. c. 66)) (Repealed by Supreme Court of Judicature (Consolidation) Act 1925 (15 & 16 Geo. 5. c. 49))
Appropriation Act 1875 (repealed)	38 & 39 Vict. c. 78	13 August 1875
An Act to apply a sum out of the Consolidated Fund to the service of the year ending the thirty-first day of March one thousand eight hundred and seventy-six, and to appropriate the Supplies granted in this Session of Parliament. (Repealed by Statute Law Revision Act 1883 (46 & 47 Vict. c. 39))
Legal Practitioners Act 1875 (repealed)	38 & 39 Vict. c. 79	13 August 1875
An Act to amend the Law relating to Legal Practitioners. (Repealed by Solicitors Act 1932 (22 & 23 Geo. 5. c. 37))
Remission of Penalties Act 1875 (repealed)	38 & 39 Vict. c. 80	13 August 1875
An Act to amend the Act of the twenty-first year of the reign of King George the Third, chapter forty-nine, intituled "An Act for preventing certain abuses and profanations on the Lord's Day called Sunday," (Note: Sunday Observance Act 1780 (21 Geo. 3. c. 49)) and for further amending the law concerning the remission of penalties. (Repealed by Statute Law Revision Act 1966 (c. 5))
Sheriff Substitute (Scotland) Act 1875 (repealed)	38 & 39 Vict. c. 81	13 August 1875
An Act to authorise the payment out of the Consolidated Fund of the United Kingdom of the Salary of an additional Sheriff Substitute in Scotland; and for other purposes. (Repealed by Glasgow Corporation and Police Act 1895 (58 & 59 Vict. c. cxliii) and Sheriff Courts (Scotland) Act 1907 (7 Edw. 7. c. 51))
National School Teachers Residences (Ireland) Act 1875 (repealed)	38 & 39 Vict. c. 82	13 August 1875
An Act to afford facilities for the erection, enlargement, improvement, and purchase of dwelling-houses for residences for Teachers of certain National Schools in Ireland. (Repealed by Administrative and Financial Provisions Act (Northern Ireland) 1952 (c. 7 (N.I.)))
Local Loans Act 1875 (repealed)	38 & 39 Vict. c. 83	13 August 1875
An Act to amend the Law relating to Securities for Loans contracted by Local Authorities. (Repealed by Local Government and Housing Act 1989 (c. 42))
Parliamentary Elections (Returning Officers) Act 1875 (repealed)	38 & 39 Vict. c. 84	13 August 1875
An Act to regulate the Expenses and to control the Charges of Returning Officers at Parliamentary Elections. (Repealed by Representation of the People Act 1948 (11 & 12 Geo. 6. c. 65))
Foreign Jurisdiction Act 1875 (repealed)	38 & 39 Vict. c. 85	13 August 1875
An Act for amending the Foreign Jurisdiction Acts. (Repealed by Foreign Jurisdiction Act 1890 (53 & 54 Vict. c. 37))
Conspiracy and Protection of Property Act 1875 (repealed)	38 & 39 Vict. c. 86	13 August 1875
An Act for amending the Law relating to Conspiracy, and to the Protection of Property, and for other purposes. (Repealed by Statute Law (Repeals) Act 2008 (c. 12))
Land Transfer Act 1875 or Lord Cairns' Act (repealed)	38 & 39 Vict. c. 87	13 August 1875
An Act to simplify Titles and facilitate the Transfer of Land in England. (Repealed by Land Registration Act 1925 (15 & 16 Geo. 5. c. 21))
Merchant Shipping Act 1875 (repealed)	38 & 39 Vict. c. 88	13 August 1875
An Act to make provision for giving further powers to the Board of Trade for stopping unseaworthy Ships. (Repealed by Merchant Shipping Act 1876 (39 & 40 Vict. c. 80))
Public Works Loans Act 1875	38 & 39 Vict. c. 89	13 August 1875
An Act to consolidate with Amendments the Acts relating to Loans for Public Works.
Employers and Workmen Act 1875 (repealed)	38 & 39 Vict. c. 90	13 August 1875
An Act to enlarge the powers of County Courts in respect of disputes between Employers and Workmen, and to give other Courts a limited civil jurisdiction in respect of such disputes. (Repealed for Great Britain by Statute Law (Repeals) Act 1973 (c. 39) and for Northern Ireland by Industrial Relations (No. 2) (Northern Ireland) Order 1976 (SI 1976/2147 (N.I. 28)))
Trade Marks Registration Act 1875 (repealed)	38 & 39 Vict. c. 91	13 August 1875
An Act to establish a Register of Trade Marks. (Repealed by Patents, Designs, and Trade Marks Act 1883 (46 & 47 Vict. c. 57) (Note: Incorrectly cited as "Patents, Designs and Trade Marks, 1882 c 57" in the Chronological Table of the Statutes.))
Agricultural Holdings (England) Act 1875 (repealed)	38 & 39 Vict. c. 92	13 August 1875
An Act for amending the Law relating to Agricultural Holdings in England. (Repealed by Agricultural Holdings (England) Act 1883 (46 & 47 Vict. c. 61))
Copyright of Designs Act 1875 (repealed)	38 & 39 Vict. c. 93	13 August 1875
An Act to amend the Copyright of Designs Acts. (Repealed by Patents, Designs, and Trade Marks Act 1883 (46 & 47 Vict. c. 57))
Offences against the Person Act 1875 (repealed)	38 & 39 Vict. c. 94	13 August 1875
An Act to amend the Law relating to Offences against the Person. (Repealed by Criminal Law Amendment Act 1885 (48 & 49 Vict. c. 69))
Sanitary Law (Dublin) Amendment Act 1875 (repealed)	38 & 39 Vict. c. 95	13 August 1875
An Act to amend an Act passed in the session of Parliament held in the thirty-third and thirty-fourth year of the reign of Her present Majesty, chapter one hundred and six, (Note: Sanitary Act (Dublin) Amendment Act 1870 (33 & 34 Vict. c. 106)) intituled "An Act to amend the Sanitary Act, 1866, (Note: Sanitary Act 1866 (29 & 30 Vict. c. 90)) so far as relates to the City of Dublin." (Repealed by Statute Law Revision Act 1894 (57 & 58 Vict. c. 56))
National School Teachers (Ireland) Act 1875 (repealed)	38 & 39 Vict. c. 96	13 August 1875
An Act to provide for additional payments to Teachers of National Schools in Ireland. (Repealed by Statute Law Revision Act 1883 (46 & 47 Vict. c. 39), Statute Law Revision (No. 2) Act 1893 (56 & 57 Vict. c. 54), Welfare Services Act (Northern Ireland) 1949 (c. 1 (N.I.)) and Children and Young Persons Act (Northern Ireland) 1950 (c. 5 (N.I.)))

=== Local acts ===
Short title	Citation	Royal assent
Long title
Land Drainage Supplemental Act 1875 (repealed)	38 & 39 Vict. c. i	19 March 1875
An Act to confirm a Provisional Order under "The Land Drainage Act, 1861," (Note: Land Drainage Act 1861 (24 & 25 Vict. c. 133)) relating to Lay Improvement, situated in the parishes of Westbury-on-Severn, Churcham, and Minsterworth, in the county of Gloucester. (Repealed by Statute Law (Repeals) Act 1993 (c. 50))
Local Government Board (Ireland) Provisional Orders (Kingstown and Galway) Confirmation Act 1875	38 & 39 Vict. c. ii	22 April 1875
An Act to confirm certain Provisional Orders made by the Local Government Board for Ireland relating to the Township of Kingstown and the Town of Galway.
	Kingstown Drainage Order 1875 Kingstown Drainage. Provisional Order.	
	Galway Town Provisional Order 1875 Town of Galway. Provisional Order.	
Columbia Market Act 1875	38 & 39 Vict. c. iii	22 April 1875
An Act for confirming the re-transfer of Columbia Market by the Mayor and Commonalty and Citizens of the City of London to the Baroness Burdett-Coutts, (Note: Angela Burdett-Coutts, 1st Baroness Burdett-Coutts.) and for making further provision respecting the maintenance and use of the Market; and for other purposes.
Commissioners of Sewers of the City of London Act 1875	38 & 39 Vict. c. iv	22 April 1875
An Act for making better provision respecting the borrowing of Money by the Commissioners of Sewers of the City of London, and the repayment thereof; and for other purposes.
Edinburgh Royal Infirmary Act 1875	38 & 39 Vict. c. v	22 April 1875
An Act for authorising the Corporation of the Royal Infirmary of Edinburgh to apply certain funds to the purposes of their hospital buildings; to construct a new sewer; and for other purposes.
Glasgow Faculty of Procurators Widows Fund Act 1875 (repealed)	38 & 39 Vict. c. vi	22 April 1875
An Act for amending an Act passed in the third year of the reign of King William the Fourth, intituled "An Act for the better establishing and securing a fund for providing annuities to the widows and children of the members of the Faculty of Procurators of Glasgow;" (Note: Faculty of Procurators of Glasgow Widows Fund Act 1833 (3 & 4 Will. 4. c. lxiv)) for discontinuing the admission of new contributors to the fund; for transferring the fund and its liabilities; and for other purposes/ (Repealed by Statute Law (Repeals) Act 1998 (c. 43))
Education Department Provisional Orders Confirmation (Caister, &c.) Act 1875	38 & 39 Vict. c. vii	13 May 1875
An Act to confirm certain Provisional Orders made by the Education Department under "The Elementary Education Act, 1870," (Note: Elementary Education Act 1870 (33 & 34 Vict. c. 75)) to enable the School Boards for Caister, Norfolk, and Rochford, Essex, to put in force "The Lands Clauses Consolidation Act, 1845," (Note: Lands Clauses Consolidation Act 1845 (8 & 9 Vict. c. 18)) and the Acts amending the same.
	Caister Order 1875 Provisional Order for putting in force the Lands Clauses Consolidation Act, 1845.	
	Rochford Order 1875 Provisional Order for putting in force the Lands Clauses Consolidation Act, 1845.	
Education Department Provisional Order Confirmation (Brighton) Act 1875	38 & 39 Vict. c. viii	13 May 1875
An Act to confirm a Provisional Order made by the Education Department under "The Elementary Education Act, 1870," to enable the School Board for Brighton to put in force "The Lands Clauses Consolidation Act, 1845," and the Acts amending the same.
	Brighton Order 1875 Provisional Order for putting in force the Lands Clauses Consolidation Act, 1845.	
Public Health (Scotland) Act 1867 Order Confirmation Act 1875 (No. 1) or the Public Health (Scotland) Act 1867 Order Confirmation (No. 1) Act 1875	38 & 39 Vict. c. ix	13 May 1875
An Act for confirming a Provisional Order made under the "Public Health (Scotland) Act, 1867," (Note: Public Health (Scotland) Act 1867 (30 & 31 Vict. c. 101)) relating to the parish of Beith in the county of Ayr.
	Beith Order 1875 Provisional Order relating to the Parish of Beith in the County of Ayr.	
Local Government Board's Provisional Orders Confirmation Act 1875 (No. 1) or the Local Government Board's Provisional Orders Confirmation (No. 1) Act 1875	38 & 39 Vict. c. x	13 May 1875
An Act to confirm certain Provisional Orders of the Local Government Board relating to the Districts of Astley Abbotts, the Borough of Barnstaple, the District of Bicester Market End, the Special Drainage District of Childs Hill, the Districts of Chiswick and Lepton, the Boroughs of Saint Alban and Sheffield, and the District of Slaithwaite.
	Astley Abbotts Order 1875 Provisional Order for dissolving the Local Government District of Astley Abbotts.	
	Barnstaple Order 1875 Provisional Order to enable the Urban Sanitary Authority for the Borough of Barnstaple to put in force the Compulsory Clauses of the Lands Clauses Consolidation Act, 1845.	
	Bicester Order 1875 Provisional Order for dissolving the Local Government District of Bicester King's End, and for extending the Local Government District of Bicester Market End.	
	Childs Hill Special Drainage District Order 1875 Provisional Order for dissolving the Childs Hill Special Drainage District.	
	Chiswick Order 1875 Provisional Order to enable the Chiswich Improvement Commissioners to put in force the Compulsory Clauses of the Lands Clauses Consolidation Act, 1845.	
	Lepton Order 1875 Provisional Order for constituting the Lepton Urban Sanitary District.	
	St. Albans Order 1875 Provisional Order for repealing a Local Act (Note: St. Albans Improvement Act 1804 (44 Geo. 3. c. viii)) relating to the Borough of Saint Alban, and for transfer of debt and assets.	
	Sheffield Order 1875 Provisional Order to enable the Urban Sanitary Authority for the Borough of Sheffield to put in force the Compulsory Clauses of the Lands Clauses Consolidation Act, 1845.	
	Slaithwaite Order 1875 Provisional Order for extending the Local Government District of Slaithwaite, for prescribing the number of Members of the Local Board, and for dividing such District into Wards.	
Pier and Harbour Orders Confirmation Act 1875 (No. 1) or the Pier and Harbour Orders Confirmation (No. 1) Act 1875	38 & 39 Vict. c. xi	13 May 1875
An Act for confirming certain Provisional Orders made by the Board of Trade under The General Pier and Harbour Act, 1861, (Note: General Pier and Harbour Act 1861 (24 & 25 Vict. c. 45)) relating to Bournemouth, Carnlough, Clacton-on-Sea, Folkestone, Hythe (Southampton), and Withernsea.
	Bournemouth Promenade Pier Order 1875 Order for the Construction, Maintenance, and Regulation of a Pier at Bournemouth, in the County of Hants.	
	Carnlough Harbour Order 1875 Order for power to levy rates and make regulations in and with reference to the Harbour of Carnlough, in the County of Antrim.	
	Clacton-on-Sea Pier Order 1875 Order for the Completion, Maintenance, and Regulation of the Pier at Clacton-on-Sea, in the County of Essex, authorised by the Thorpe and Great Clacton Railway Act, 1866. (Note: Thorpe and Great Clacton Railway Act 1866 (29 & 30 Vict. c. cxciv))	
	Folkestone Promenade Pier Order 1875 Order for the Construction, Maintenance, and Regulation of a Pier at Folkestone, in the County of Kent.	
	Hythe Pier Order 1875 Order for the Construction, Maintenance, and Regulation of a Pier at Hythe, in the County of Southampton.	
	Withernsea Pier Order 1875 Order for the Construction, Maintenance, and Regulation of a Pier at Owthorn, adjoining Withernsea, in the East Riding of the County of York.	
Public Health (Scotland) Act 1867 Order Confirmation Act 1875 (No. 2) or the Public Health (Scotland) Act 1867 Order Confirmation (No. 2) Act 1875	38 & 39 Vict. c. xii	13 May 1875
An Act for confirming a Provisional Order made under the "Public Health (Scotland) Act, 1867," relating to the Barony of Fraserburgh in the county of Aberdeen.
	Fraserburgh Order 1875 Provisional Order relating to the Burgh of Barony of Fraserburgh, in the County of Aberdeen.	
Heckmondwike Gas Act 1875	38 & 39 Vict. c. xiii	13 May 1875
An Act to empower the Heckmondwike Gas Company to alter and extend their existing Works; to construct new Works, and to acquire additional Lands for the same; to raise additional Capital; and for other purposes.
British Gaslight Company (Norwich) Act 1875	38 & 39 Vict. c. xiv	13 May 1875
An Act for empowering the British Gaslight Company, Limited, to enlarge their Works and to expend further Capital at Norwich; and for other purposes.
Southampton Docks Act 1875	38 & 39 Vict. c. xv	13 May 1875
An Act to amend "The Southampton Docks Act, 1871." (Note: Southampton Docks Act 1871 (34 & 35 Vict. c. cxxx))
Sutherland and Caithness Railway Act 1875	38 & 39 Vict. c. xvi	13 May 1875
An Act to authorise Diversions of the Sutherland and Caithness Railway; and for other purposes.
East Norfolk Railway Act 1875	38 & 39 Vict. c. xvii	13 May 1875
An Act for authorising the East Norfolk Railway Company to raise further money; for regulating the Capital of the Company; and for extending the time for the purchase of lands for the extension to Cromer; and for other purposes.
London, Tilbury and Southend Railway (Steamboats) Act 1875	38 & 39 Vict. c. xviii	13 May 1875
An Act to enlarge the powers of the London, Tilbury, and Southend Railway Company with respect to the providing Steam Communication between their railway and Gravesend.
Mersey Docks Act 1875 (repealed)	38 & 39 Vict. c. xix	13 May 1875
An Act to confirm an Agreement for the purchase by the Mersey Docks and Harbour Board of certain lands, tenements, and hereditaments from the Mayor, Aldermen, and Burgesses of Liverpool; and for other purposes. (Repealed by Mersey Docks and Harbour Act 1971 (c. lvii))
Cleveland Gas Act 1875	38 & 39 Vict. c. xx	13 May 1875
An Act for incorporating "The Cleveland Gas Company," and enabling them to construct Gasworks, and light with Gas Skelton and other places in the North Riding of Yorkshire.
Girvan and Portpatrick Junction Railway Act 1875	38 & 39 Vict. c. xxi	13 May 1875
An Act to enable the Girvan and Portpatrick Junction Railway Company to raise additional Capital, and attach a preference to certain portions of the authorised Capital.
Longton Gas Act 1875 (repealed)	38 & 39 Vict. c. xxii	13 May 1875
An Act for empowering the Longton Gas Company to extend their limits of supply; and for other purposes. (Repealed by Stoke-on-Trent (Gas Consolidation) Act 1922 (12 & 13 Geo. 5. c. xxii))
Tyne Improvement Commission Act 1875 (repealed)	38 & 39 Vict. c. xxiii	13 May 1875
An Act for the extension of the Tyne Improvement Commission; and for other purposes. (Repealed by Tyne Improvement Act 1934 (24 & 25 Geo. 5. c. lxxviii))
Crystal Palace Company's Act 1875 (repealed)	38 & 39 Vict. c. xxiv	13 May 1875
An Act to grant further powers to the Crystal Palace Company. (Repealed by London County Council (Crystal Palace) Act 1951 (14 & 15 Geo. 6. c. xxviii))
Cwm Park Bridge Act 1875	38 & 39 Vict. c. xxv	13 May 1875
An Act for making and maintaining a Bridge for carrying the Road from Treorki to Cwm Park, over the River Rhondda Fawr, in the county of Glamorgan.
Midland and North Eastern Railways Act 1875	38 & 39 Vict. c. xxvi	13 May 1875
An Act for enabling the Midland and North-eastern Railway Companies to make certain Junction Lines of Railway in connexion with their authorised Railway between Swinton and Knottingley; and for other purposes.
Broadstairs Gas Act 1875	38 & 39 Vict. c. xxvii	13 May 1875
An Act to dissolve and re-incorporate the Broadstairs Gaslight and Coke Company, Limited, and to grant them powers to improve their Works and increase their Capital; and for other purposes.
St. Philip's Bridge (Bristol) Transfer Act 1875	38 & 39 Vict. c. xxviii	13 May 1875
An Act to provide for the vesting in the Mayor, Aldermen, and Burgesses of the city of Bristol Saint Philip's Bridge in that city; and for other purposes.
Southend Local Board Act 1875 (repealed)	38 & 39 Vict. c. xxix	13 May 1875
An Act for empowering the Local Board for the District of Southend in the county of Essex to purchase the Pier there; and for other purposes. (Repealed by Essex Act 1987 (c. xx))
Eastbourne Waterworks Act 1875	38 & 39 Vict. c. xxx	28 May 1875
An Act for conferring further powers on the Eastbourne Waterworks Company for the construction and maintenance of works and otherwise in relation to their undertaking, and for regulating their Share and Loan Capital; and for other purposes.
Maidenhead Waterworks Act 1875	38 & 39 Vict. c. xxxi	28 May 1875
An Act for better supplying the borough of Maidenhead and other places in Berkshire with Water.
Torbay and Brixham Railway Act 1875	38 & 39 Vict. c. xxxii	28 May 1875
An Act conferring further powers on the Torbay and Brixham Railway Company.
Carmarthen Gas Act 1875	38 & 39 Vict. c. xxxiii	28 May 1875
An Act to authorise the Carmarthen Gas Company to raise additional capital; to confer further powers on them; and for other purposes.
Military Manœuvres Act 1875 or the Military Manoeuvres Act 1875	38 & 39 Vict. c. xxxiv	14 June 1875
An Act for making provision for facilitating the Manœuvres of Troops to be assembled during the present Summer.
Bristol Port and Channel Dock Act 1875	38 & 39 Vict. c. xxxv	14 June 1875
An Act for authorising the Bristol Port and Channel Dock Company to raise further money for (amongst other things) the erection or purchase of warehouses, depôts, and other buildings and conveniences in connexion with their Dock; and for other purposes.
Greenock Water Act 1875 (repealed)	38 & 39 Vict. c. xxxvi	14 June 1875
An Act for authorising the Water Trust of Greenock to construct further works; to raise further Money; and for amending the provisions of the Acts relating to the Trust; and for other purposes. (Repealed by Greenock Corporation Act 1909 (9 Edw. 7. c. cxxix))
Ulster, and Portadown, Dungannon and Omagh Junction Railways Amalgamation Act 1875	38 & 39 Vict. c. xxxvii	14 June 1875
An Act to amalgamate the Undertaking of the Portadown, Dungannon, and Omagh Junction Railway Company with that of the Ulster Railway Company; and to confer further powers on the last-named Company with respect to their own Undertaking.
Ashton-in-Makerfield Local Board Act 1875	38 & 39 Vict. c. xxxviii	14 June 1875
An Act to empower the Local Board for the District of Ashton-in-Makerfield to manufacture Gas, and to supply their District with Gas and Water; and for other purposes.
Cleethorpes Gas Act 1875	38 & 39 Vict. c. xxxix	14 June 1875
An Act to authorise the Cleethorpes Gas Company to erect additional Works; to raise further Capital; and for other purposes.
Hindley Local Board Act 1875	38 & 39 Vict. c. xl	14 June 1875
An Act for conferring further powers on the Local Board for the District of Hindley, in the county of Lancaster, to purchase Lands and extend their Gasworks; to extend the Time for the Completion of their Waterworks; to amend the Hindley Local Board Act, 1872; (Note: Hindley Local Board Act 1872 (35 & 36 Vict. c. lxxx)) to empower the Local Board to raise further Money; and for other purposes.
Oxford (Corporation) Waterworks Act 1875	38 & 39 Vict. c. xli	14 June 1875
An Act for better enabling the Mayor, Aldermen, and Citizens of Oxford to supply Oxford and other places with Water.
Pemberton Local Board Water Act 1875	38 & 39 Vict. c. xlii	14 June 1875
An Act to authorise the Local Board for the District of Pemberton to construct Waterworks; and for other purposes.
Pontypridd Waterworks Act 1875	38 & 39 Vict. c. xliii	14 June 1875
An Act to authorise the Pontypridd Waterworks Company to make new Waterworks; to extend their limits of supply; to raise more money; and for other purposes.
Staffordshire and Worcestershire Canal Act 1875	38 & 39 Vict. c. xliv	14 June 1875
An Act to empower the Company of Proprietors of the Staffordshire and Worcestershire Canal Navigation to convert their Share Capital into Stock, and to create and issue Debenture Stock; and for other purposes.
Truro and Perran Mineral Railway (Abandonment) Act 1875 (repealed)	38 & 39 Vict. c. xlv	14 June 1875
An Act for the Abandonment of the Railways authorised by "The Truro and Perran Mineral Railway Act, 1872;" (Note: Truro and Perran Mineral Railway Act 1872 (35 & 36 Vict. c. cxxxiii)) and for other purposes. (Repealed by Statute Law (Repeals) Act 2013 (c. 2))
Metropolitan Cattle Market Act 1875 (repealed)	38 & 39 Vict. c. xlvi	14 June 1875
An Act for varying the Leasing Powers relating to parts of the site of the Metropolitan Cattle Market; and for other purposes. (Repealed by City of London (Various Powers) Act 1963 (c. xxxiv))
Gravesend Terrace Pier (Sale) Act 1875	38 & 39 Vict. c. xlvii	14 June 1875
An Act for authorising the Sale of the Gravesend Terrace Pier; and for other purposes.
Liverpool Tramways Act 1875 (repealed)	38 & 39 Vict. c. xlviii	14 June 1875
An Act for confirming and giving effect to an Agreement between the Liverpool Tramways Company and the Mayor, Aldermen, and Burgesses of the Borough of Liverpool, with reference to certain Tramways of the Company within the said Borough; and for other purposes. (Repealed by Liverpool Corporation Act 1921 (11 & 12 Geo. 5. c. lxxiv))
Railway Passengers Assurance Company's Act 1875 (repealed)	38 & 39 Vict. c. xlix	14 June 1875
An Act to give powers to the Railway Passengers Assurance Company with respect to the application of Profits and declaration of Dividend; and for other purposes. (Repealed by Railway Passengers Assurance (Consolidation) Act 1892 (55 & 56 Vict. c. viii))
Colchester Gas Company's Act 1875	38 & 39 Vict. c. l	14 June 1875
An Act for authorising the Colchester Gas Company to raise additional capital; for increasing the rates, rents, and charges which the Company are now authorised to take; and for other purposes.
Wye Valley Railway Amendment Act 1875	38 & 39 Vict. c. li	14 June 1875
An Act for granting further powers to the Wye Valley Railway Company, and for other purposes relating to their authorised Undertaking.
Birmingham and Lichfield Junction Railway Act 1875 (repealed)	38 & 39 Vict. c. lii	14 June 1875
An Act to extend the time limited for the compulsory purchase of Lands for so much of the Railway authorised by "The Birmingham and Lichfield Junction Railway Act, 1872," (Note: Birmingham and Lichfield Junction Railway Act 1872 (35 & 36 Vict. c. clxxii)) as was not abandoned by "The Birmingham and Lichfield Junction Railway Act, 1874;" (Note: Birmingham and Lichfield Junction Railway (Deviation) Act 1874 (37 & 38 Vict. c. xcii)) and for other purposes. (Repealed by Statute Law (Repeals) Act 2013 (c. 2))
Glasgow Police Act 1875 (repealed)	38 & 39 Vict. c. liii	14 June 1875
An Act to enable the Board of Police of Glasgow to make and maintain a new Street in the city of Glasgow, and to confirm an Agreement relative thereto. (Repealed by Statute Law (Repeals) Act 1995 (c. 44))
Stapenhill Bridge Act 1875 (repealed)	38 & 39 Vict. c. liv	14 June 1875
An Act to further extend the time for the completion of Stapenhill Bridge at Burton-upon-Trent. (Repealed by Staffordshire Act 1983 (c. xviii))
Plymouth, Devonport and Stonehouse Cemetery (Extension) Act 1875	38 & 39 Vict. c. lv	14 June 1875
An Act to empower the Plymouth, Devonport, and Stonehouse Cemetery Company to enlarge their Cemetery, and to confer further powers upon them in relation to their Undertaking; and for other purposes.
Lymington Harbour and Docks (Extension of Time) Act 1875	38 & 39 Vict. c. lvi	14 June 1875
An Act to further extend the time for the Purchase of Lands and for the Construction of the Works authorised by "The Lymington Harbour and Docks Act, 1864." (Note: Lymington Harbour and Docks Act 1864 (27 & 28 Vict. c. cxx))
London, Tilbury and Southend Railway Act 1875	38 & 39 Vict. c. lvii	14 June 1875
An Act for conferring further powers upon the London, Tilbury, and Southend Railway Company.
Halkyn District Mines Drainage Act 1875	38 & 39 Vict. c. lviii	14 June 1875
An Act to effect the Drainage of certain Mines and Mineral Lands in the county of Flint; and for other purposes.
London Central Markets Act 1875	38 & 39 Vict. c. lix	14 June 1875
An Act for the establishment of a Fruit, Vegetable, and Flower Market in the City of London, and the extension of the Metropolitan Meat and Poultry Market there, and the abolition of Farringdon Market; and for other purposes.
Ryde and Newport and Cowes and Newport Railways Act 1875	38 & 39 Vict. c. lx	14 June 1875
An Act to authorise the raising of new capital by the Ryde and Newport Railway Company and the Cowes and Newport Railway Company; and for other purposes.
East London Railway Act 1875	38 & 39 Vict. c. lxi	14 June 1875
An Act to enlarge the Powers of the East London Railway Company for the Completion of their Railway, and for the raising of Capital; and for other purposes.
York (Skeldergate Bridge) Improvement Act 1875 (repealed)	38 & 39 Vict. c. lxii	14 June 1875
An Act to authorise the construction of a Bridge across the River Ouse in the city of York, with Approaches thereto, and for raising, lowering, widening, altering, and improving certain streets or thoroughfares and places within the said city; and for other purposes. (Repealed by York Corporation Act 1969 (c. xxxviii))
Worksop Waterworks Act 1875	38 & 39 Vict. c. lxiii	14 June 1875
An Act for better supplying with Water the Parish of Worksop, in the County of Nottingham; and for other purposes.
Manchester, Sheffield and Lincolnshire Railway Act 1875	38 & 39 Vict. c. lxiv	14 June 1875
An Act for authorising the Manchester, Sheffield, and Lincolnshire Railway Company to make a new Branch Railway; for conferring upon them additional powers; and for other purposes.
Sandbach and Winsford Junction Railway Abandonment Act 1875 (repealed)	38 & 39 Vict. c. lxv	14 June 1875
An Act for the abandonment of the Sandbach and Winsford Junction Railway. (Repealed by Statute Law (Repeals) Act 2013 (c. 2))
Banbridge Extension Railway (Sale) Act 1875	38 & 39 Vict. c. lxvi	14 June 1875
An Act to authorise the sale of the Undertaking of the Banbridge Extension Railway Company by the Court of Bankruptcy in Ireland, and for the dissolution of the said Company.
Ashton-under-Lyne, Stalybridge and Dukinfield (District) Waterworks Act 1875 (repealed)	38 & 39 Vict. c. lxvii	14 June 1875
An Act to extend the period for the compulsory purchase of Lands by the Ashton-under-Lyne, Stalybridge, and Dukinfield (District) Waterworks Joint Committee; and for other purposes. (Repealed by West Pennine Water Order 1968 (SI 1968/512))
Baybridge Canal (Abandonment) Act 1875	38 & 39 Vict. c. lxviii	14 June 1875
An Act to provide for the closing of the Baybridge Canal, and the sale of the site thereof; and for other purposes.
Ossett-cum-Gawthorpe Local Board Act 1875 (repealed)	38 & 39 Vict. c. lxix	14 June 1875
An Act for empowering the Local Board for the District of Ossett-cum-Gawthorpe, in the West Riding of the county of York, to make Waterworks and to supply Water, and to make Sewerage Works and Improvements of Streets; and for other purposes. (Repealed by West Yorkshire Act 1980 (c. xiv))
Rotherham Corporation Act 1875 (repealed)	38 & 39 Vict. c. lxx	14 June 1875
An Act to authorise the Mayor, Aldermen, and Burgesses of the Borough of Rotherham to raise more money for their Waterworks Undertaking, and to construct a Bridge over the River Dun, and to alter certain of the provisions of "The Rotherham and Kimberworth Local Board of Health Act, 1863," (Note: Rotherham and Kimberworth Local Board of Health Act 1863 (26 & 27 Vict. c. cxvii)) relating to Markets and Fairs; and for other purposes. (Repealed by Statute Law (Repeals) Act 1989 (c. 43))
Tillington Drainage Act 1875	38 & 39 Vict. c. lxxi	14 June 1875
An Act for making provision for the Drainage and Improvement of the marsh, meadow, and other low lands and grounds lying on and near the Rivers Darling and Sow, and for the sale of Deepmoor Common in the Parish of Berkswich, and of Green Common in the Parish of Castle Church, all in the county of Stafford; and for other purposes.
St. Pancras and St. Giles in the Fields Disused Burial Grounds Act 1875	38 & 39 Vict. c. lxxii	14 June 1875
An Act to provide for the maintaining as an open space, by the Vestry of the Parish of Saint Pancras, of the disused Burial-grounds of the Parishes of Saint Pancras and Saint Giles-in-the-Fields, and other lands and hereditaments near thereto in the said Parish of Saint Pancras; and for other purposes.
Public Health (Scotland) Act 1867 Order Confirmation Act 1875 (No. 3) or the Public Health (Scotland) Act 1867 Order Confirmation (No. 3) Act 1875	38 & 39 Vict. c. lxxiii	29 June 1875
An Act for confirming a Provisional Order made under "The Public Health (Scotland) Act, 1867," relating to the Parish of Cambuslang, in the county of Lanark.
	Cambuslang Order 1875 Provisional Order relating to the Parish of Cambuslang, in the County of Lanark.	
St. Paul's Cathedral, London, Minor Canonries Act 1875	38 & 39 Vict. c. lxxiv	29 June 1875
An Act to extend the provisions of the Act of the third and fourth years of Her Majesty, Chapter One hundred and thirteen, (Note: Ecclesiastical Commissioners Act 1840 (3 & 4 Vict.. c. 113)) relating to Minor Canonries, so as to authorise certain arrangements with reference to the Minor Canonries in the Cathedral Church of Saint Paul in London.
Local Government Board's Provisional Orders Confirmation Act 1875 (No. 2) or the Local Government Board's Provisional Orders Confirmation (No. 2) Act 1875	38 & 39 Vict. c. lxxv	29 June 1875
An Act to confirm certain Provisional Orders of the Local Government Board relating to the Districts of Blaydon, Cleator Moor, Fairfield, Goole, and Keighley, and to the Borough of Lancaster.
	Blaydon Order 1875 Provisional Order for extending the Local Government District of Blaydon, and for prescribing the number of Members of the Local Board.	
	Cleator Moor Order 1875 Provisional Order to enable the Cleator Moor Local Board to put in force the Compulsory Clauses of the Lands Clauses Consolidation Act, 1845.	
	Fairfield Order 1875 Provisional Order extending the Local Government District of Fairfield.	
	Goole Order 1875 Provisional Order for constituting the Goole Urban Sanitary District.	
	Keighley Order 1875 Provisional Order to enable the Urban Sanitary Authority for the District of Keighley to put in force the Compulsory Clauses of the Lands Clauses Consolidation Act, 1845.	
	Lancaster Order 1875 Provisional Order to enable the Urban Sanitary Authority for the Borough of Lancaster to put in force the Compulsory Clauses of the Lands Clauses Consolidation Act, 1845.	
Local Government Board's Provisional Orders Confirmation Act 1875 (No. 3) or the Local Government Board's Provisional Orders Confirmation (No. 3) Act 1875	38 & 39 Vict. c. lxxvi	29 June 1875
An Act to confirm certain Provisional Orders of the Local Government Board relating to the Districts of Bar mouth and Chiswick, the Borough of Harwich, the Districts of Heywood (two), Keighley, Northwich, and Saint Neots, and the Borough of Tiverton.
	Barmouth Order 1875 Provisional Order to enable the Barmouth Local Board to put in force the Compulsory Clauses of the Lands Clauses Consolidation Act, 1845.	
	Chiswick Order 1875 Provisional Order for partially repealing and altering a Local Act. (Note: Chiswick Improvement Act 1858 (21 & 22 Vict. c. lxix))	
	Harwich Order 1875 Provisional Order for partially repealing and altering a Local Act. (Note: Harwich Improvement Act 1819 (59 Geo. 3. c. cxviii))	
	Heywood Order (1) 1875 Provisional Order to enable the Urban Sanitary Authority for the District of Heywood to put in force the Compulsory Clauses of the Lands Clauses Consolidation Act, 1845.	
	Heywood Order (2) 1875 Provisional Order for amending a Local Act. (Note: Heywood Improvement Act 1867 (30 & 31 Vict. c. lxiv))	
	Keighley Order 1875 Provisional Order for extending the Keighley Local Government District, and the provisions of certain Local Acts.	
	Northwich Order 1875 Provisional Order for dissolving the Local Government Districts of Northwich and Witton-cum-Twambrooks, and for other purposes.	
	St. Neots Order 1875 Provisional Order to enable the Urban Sanitary Authority for the District of Saint Neots to put in force the Compulsory Clauses of the Lands Clauses Consolidation Act, 1845.	
	Tiverton Order 1875 Provisional Order for dissolving the Tiverton Improvement Act (Note: Tiverton Improvement Act 1794 (34 Geo. 3. c. 52)) District.	
Marlborough Gas Act 1875	38 & 39 Vict. c. lxxvii	29 June 1875
An Act for better supplying with Gas Marlborough and its neighbourhood, in the county of Wilts.
Prudential Assurance Company Act 1875	38 & 39 Vict. c. lxxviii	29 June 1875
An Act for removing difficulties attending the conduct of the business and the exercise of the powers of the Prudential Assurance Company; and for other purposes.
Bath Gas Act 1875	38 & 39 Vict. c. lxxix	29 June 1875
An Act to extend the limits of supply of the Bath Gaslight and Coke Company, to enable that Company to raise additional Capital, and to confer further powers upon them; and for other purposes.
Bradford Waterworks and Improvement Act 1875	38 & 39 Vict. c. lxxx	29 June 1875
An Act to enable the Mayor, Aldermen, and Burgesses of the Borough of Bradford, in the West Riding of the county of York, to construct and maintain Reservoirs and Conduits for the Storage and Supply of Water; to con struct and maintain Gasworks; to effect Public Improvements; and for other purposes.
Millom Gas and Water Act 1875	38 & 39 Vict. c. lxxxi	29 June 1875
An Act for incorporating a Company for supplying with Gas and Water the Townships of Millom Below and Chapel Sucken, in the Parish of Millom, in the county of Cumberland; and for other purposes.
Pontefract Borough Extension Act 1875 (repealed)	38 & 39 Vict. c. lxxxii	29 June 1875
An Act for extending the Boundaries of the Borough of Pontefract, in the West Riding of the County of York, and for transferring the powers of the Pontefract Street Commissioners to the Mayor, Aldermen, and Burgesses of the Borough; and for other purposes. (Repealed by West Yorkshire Act 1980 (c. xiv))
Portishead District Water Act 1875	38 & 39 Vict. c. lxxxiii	29 June 1875
An Act for dissolving the Portishead District Waterworks Company (Limited), and for re-incorporating the members thereof with others, and for supplying Water to Portishead and neighbouring parishes and places in the county of Somerset; and for other purposes.
Truro Water Act 1875	38 & 39 Vict. c. lxxxiv	29 June 1875
An Act for better supplying with Water the District of Truro in the county of Cornwall; and for other purposes.
Market Rasen Water Act 1875	38 & 39 Vict. c. lxxxv	29 June 1875
An Act for incorporating the Market Rasen Water Company, and for better supplying with Water the Town of Market Rasen in the county of Lincoln, and the several places adjacent thereto; and for other purposes.
Tees Conservancy Act 1875	38 & 39 Vict. c. lxxxvi	29 June 1875
An Act for further empowering the Tees Conservancy Commissioners, and for amending their Acts; and for other purposes.
Middlesex Industrial Schools Act 1875 (repealed)	38 & 39 Vict. c. lxxxvii	29 June 1875
An Act to amend "The Middlesex Industrial Schools Act, 1854." (Note: Middlesex Industrial Schools Act 1854 (17 & 18 Vict. c. clxix)) (Repealed by Children Act 1908 (8 Edw. 7. c. 67))
Widnes Local Board Act 1875	38 & 39 Vict. c. lxxxviii	29 June 1875
An Act for authorising the Local Board for the District of Widnes in the county of Lancaster to extend their Gas and Water Limits; to construct additional Gas and Water Works; to improve their District and raise further Moneys; and for other purposes.
Inverness Water and Gas Act 1875	38 & 39 Vict. c. lxxxix	29 June 1875
An Act for empowering the Commissioners of Police of the Royal Burgh of Inverness to purchase the Under taking of the Inverness Gas and Water Company, and to supply the burgh and places adjacent with Water and Gas; and for other purposes.
South Devon Railway Act 1875	38 & 39 Vict. c. xc	29 June 1875
An Act to confer further powers on the South Devon Railway Company with reference to their own Undertaking and the Undertaking of the Buckfastleigh, Totnes, and South Devon Railway Company; and for other purposes.
Cheshire Lines Act 1875	38 & 39 Vict. c. xci	29 June 1875
An Act for conferring further powers on the Cheshire Lines Committee; and for other purposes.
Leicester Waterworks Act 1875 (repealed)	38 & 39 Vict. c. xcii	29 June 1875
An Act for empowering the Leicester Waterworks Company to raise additional Capital; and for other purposes. (Repealed by Leicester Corporation Act 1956 (4 & 5 Eliz. 2. c. xlix))
North Eastern Railway Act 1875	38 & 39 Vict. c. xciii	29 June 1875
An Act for enabling the North-eastern Railway Company to make new Railways and Works; and for other purposes.
Rochdale Improvement Act 1875	38 & 39 Vict. c. xciv	29 June 1875
An Act to extend the time for the completing of certain Waterworks of the Municipal Corporation of Rochdale; to confer further powers on that Corporation for the purposes of those Waterworks and the better Government of the Borough; and for other purposes.
Middlesbrough and Stockton Tramways Act 1875	38 & 39 Vict. c. xcv	29 June 1875
An Act to authorise the Middlesbrough and Stockton Tramways Company, Limited, to construct additional Tramways in the Borough of Middlesbrough, in the North Riding of the county of York; to extend the time for constructing and completing their authorised works; and for other purposes.
London, Brighton and South Coast Railway Act 1875	38 & 39 Vict. c. xcvi	29 June 1875
An Act for conferring further powers on the London, Brighton, and South Coast Railway Company.
Glasgow and Yoker Road Act 1875	38 & 39 Vict. c. xcvii	29 June 1875
An Act for making a diversion of a portion of the Glasgow and Yoker Turnpike Road, in the county of Lanark, and of the Tramway laid down thereon; and for other purposes.
Brewood and Wolverhampton Railway Act 1875 (repealed)	38 & 39 Vict. c. xcviii	29 June 1875
An Act to authorise the Brewood and Wolverhampton Railway Company to construct a new Junction with the London and North-western Railway; and for other purposes. (Repealed by Brewood and Wolverhampton Railway (Abandonment) Act 1879 (42 & 43 Vict. c. xv))
Glasgow and Kilmarnock Joint Line Act 1875	38 & 39 Vict. c. xcix	29 June 1875
An Act for enabling the Caledonian and the Glasgow and South-western Railway Companies to make certain Railways in the county of Lanark, and to abandon others in that county and in the county of Ayr in connexion with their Glasgow and Kilmarnock Joint Line; for extending the period for completing another portion of railway connected with that line; and for other purposes.
North British Railway Act 1875	38 & 39 Vict. c. c	29 June 1875
An Act to extend the time for completing the Tay Bridge and Newport Railways; to authorise the North British Railway Company to purchase additional Station Lands, to lay down pipes for Distillery Dreg, &c., to abandon part of their Charleston Branch, to complete the amalgamation of the Devon Valley Railway, to contribute a further sum to the Harbour Works at Burntisland, to establish a Superannuation Fund; and for other purposes.
Salford Tramways and Improvement Act 1875	38 & 39 Vict. c. ci	29 June 1875
An Act to confer additional Powers on the Corporation of the Borough of Salford for the Improvement and good Government of the said Borough; and for the laying down of Tramways in and near thereto; and for the raising of further Moneys; and for other purposes.
London and North-western Railway (Bletchley, Northampton, and Rugby) Act 1875	38 & 39 Vict. c. cii	29 June 1875
An Act for enabling the London and North-western Railway Company to construct new Railways from Bletchley to Northampton and Rugby; and for other purposes.
Sheffield and Midland Railway Companies' Committee Act 1875	38 & 39 Vict. c. ciii	29 June 1875
An Act for conferring further powers upon the Sheffield and Midland Railway Companies Committee, and upon the two Companies represented upon that Committee; and for other purposes.
Busby Water Act 1875	38 & 39 Vict. c. civ	29 June 1875
An Act for supplying the Village of Busby and the district adjoining with Water.
Hamilton Water Act 1875	38 & 39 Vict. c. cv	29 June 1875
An Act for authorising the construction of new Works and the raising of a further sum of Money by the Hamilton Waterworks Commissioners; for transferring the Hamilton Waterworks from the Commissioners now managing the same to the Magistrates and Town Council of the Burgh of Hamilton; and for other purposes.
Newport Pagnell Railway (Transfer and Dissolution) Act 1875	38 & 39 Vict. c. cvi	29 June 1875
An Act to authorise the Newport Pagnell Railway Company to abandon portions of their Undertaking, and to transfer the remainder thereof to the London and North-western Railway Company; and for other purposes.
Metropolitan Railway Act 1875	38 & 39 Vict. c. cvii	29 June 1875
An Act to grant further powers to the Metropolitan Railway Company; and for other purposes.
Chelsea Waterworks Act 1875	38 & 39 Vict. c. cviii	29 June 1875
An Act for authorising the Governor and Company of Chelsea Waterworks to take water from the River Thames, in the parish of West Moulsey, in the county of Surrey, and to construct additional Works, and to raise further Moneys; and for other purposes.
Cork Improvement Act 1875	38 & 39 Vict. c. cix	29 June 1875
An Act to enable the Mayor, Aldermen, and Burgesses of the Borough of Cork to remove certain Bridges over the River Lee and to erect new Bridges in lieu thereof; to vest in them the existing Bridges over the said River, situated in said Borough; to enable the Cork Harbour Com missioners to contribute; and for other purposes.
Great Northern Railway Act 1875	38 & 39 Vict. c. cx	29 June 1875
An Act to grant further powers to the Great Northern Railway Company with relation to their own and other Undertakings; and for other purposes.
Midland Railway (Additional Powers) Act 1875	38 & 39 Vict. c. cxi	29 June 1875
An Act for conferring additional powers on the Midland Railway Company for the construction of Works, for the raising of Capital, and for other purposes in relation to their own Undertaking and the Undertakings of other Companies.
Swindon and Highworth Light Railway Act 1875	38 & 39 Vict. c. cxii	29 June 1875
An Act for making a Railway from the Great Western Railway near Swindon to Highworth, all in the county of Wilts, to be called the Swindon and Highworth Light Railway; and for other purposes.
Greenock Police and Improvement Act 1875 (repealed)	38 & 39 Vict. c. cxiii	29 June 1875
An Act for conferring further powers on the Board of Police of Greenock; and for other purposes. (Repealed by Greenock Corporation Act 1909 (9 Edw. 7. c. cxxix))
London Central Railway (Abandonment) Act 1875 (repealed)	38 & 39 Vict. c. cxiv	29 June 1875
An Act for authorising the abandonment of the Railways and Streets authorised by "The London Central Railway Act, 1871;" (Note: London Central Railway Act 1871 (34 & 35 Vict. c. ccii)) and for other purposes. (Repealed by Statute Law (Repeals) Act 2013 (c. 2))
Whitthread's Patent Act 1875	38 & 39 Vict. c. cxv	29 June 1875
An Act for rendering valid certain Letters Patent granted to Francis Gerard Prange and William Whitthread for Improvements in the Utilization of Sewage.
Pier and Harbour Orders Confirmation Act 1875 (No. 2) or the Pier and Harbour Orders Confirmation (No. 2) Act 1875	38 & 39 Vict. c. cxvi	19 July 1875
An Act for confirming a Provisional Order made by the Board of Trade under the General Pier and Harbour Act, 1861, relating to Carlingford Lough.
	Harbour of Carlingford Lough Improvement Order 1875 Order for the Amendment of the Harbour of Carlingford Lough Improvement Orders, 1864, 1868, and 1874.	
Pier and Harbour Orders Confirmation Act 1875 (No. 3) or the Pier and Harbour Orders Confirmation (No. 3) Act 1875	38 & 39 Vict. c. cxvii	19 July 1875
An Act for confirming certain Provisional Orders made by the Board of Trade under the General Pier and Harbour Act, 1861, relating to Brixham, Carrickfergus, Macduff, and Rosehearty.
	Brixham Harbour Order 1875 Order for amending the Acts with respect to the Harbour of Brixham in the County of Devon, and for making further provision in regard to the said Harbour.	
	Carrickfergus Harbour Order 1875 Order for the Amendment of the Carrickfergus Harbour Orders, 1862 and 1865.	
	Macduff Harbour Order 1875 Order for power to construct additional works, and levy rates and make regulations, in and with respect to the Harbour of Macduff, in the Parish of Gamrie and County of Banff.	
	Rosehearty Harbour Order 1875 Order for amending the Rosehearty Harbour Order, 1863.	
Chelsea Hospital (Lands) Act 1875	38 & 39 Vict. c. cxviii	19 July 1875
An Act to empower the Commissioners of Her Majesty's Woods, Forests, and Land Revenues to convey certain Lands and Premises to the Commissioners of Chelsea Hospital; and for other purposes relating thereto.
Drainage and Improvement of Lands Supplemental (Ireland) Act 1875	38 & 39 Vict. c. cxix	19 July 1875
An Act to confirm a Provisional Order under "The Drainage and Improvement of Lands (Ireland) Act, 1863," (Note: Drainage and Improvement of Lands Act (Ireland) 1863 (26 & 27 Vict. c. 88)) and the Acts amending the same.
	Stoneyford River Drainage Order 1875 In the Matter of the Stoneyford River Drainage District, in the counties of Meath and Westmeath.	
Local Government Board (Ireland) Provisional Order (Coleraine) Confirmation Act 1875	38 & 39 Vict. c. cxx	19 July 1875
An Act to confirm a Provisional Order made by the Local Government Board for Ireland relating to Coleraine.
	Coleraine Burial Ground Order 1875 Coleraine Burial Ground. Provisional Order.	
Weardale and Shildon District Waterworks Act 1875	38 & 39 Vict. c. cxxi	19 July 1875
An Act for extending the limits within which the Weardale and Shildon District Waterworks Company may supply Water, and for empowering them to construct additional Works and to raise additional Capital; and for other purposes.
Broadstairs Waterworks Act 1875	38 & 39 Vict. c. cxxii	19 July 1875
An Act to dissolve and reincorporate the Broadstairs Waterworks Company, Limited, and to make further provision for the supply of Water to the parish of Saint Peter the Apostle and Broadstairs, in the Isle of Thanet; and for other purposes.
Glasgow Corporation Tramways Act 1875 (repealed)	38 & 39 Vict. c. cxxiii	19 July 1875
An Act to authorise the Lord Provost, Magistrates, and Council of the City of Glasgow to construct Tramways in the City of Glasgow and its neighbourhood; and for other purposes. (Repealed by Glasgow Corporation (Tramways Consolidation) Order Confirmation Act 1905 (5 Edw. 7. c. cxxviii))
Great Western Railway Act 1875	38 & 39 Vict. c. cxxiv	19 July 1875
An Act for conferring further powers on the Great Western Railway Company in relation to their own Undertaking and the Undertakings of other Companies; and for other purposes.
Lancashire and Yorkshire Railway Act 1875	38 & 39 Vict. c. cxxv	19 July 1875
An Act for conferring further powers on the Lancashire and Yorkshire Railway Company with relation to their Undertaking.
Southport Improvement Act 1875	38 & 39 Vict. c. cxxvi	19 July 1875
An Act for extending the boundary of the borough of Southport, in the county of Lancaster; and for other purposes.
Bristol and Exeter Railway Act 1875	38 & 39 Vict. c. cxxvii	19 July 1875
An Act to enable the Bristol and Exeter Railway Company to make a new line to Weston-super-Mare; to transfer to that Company the powers of the Exe Valley Railway Company, and to confer further powers upon the Company with respect to their Undertaking and the Undertakings of the Exe Valley and Culm Valley Railway Companies; and for other purposes.
Edinburgh Tramways Act 1875 (repealed)	38 & 39 Vict. c. cxxviii	19 July 1875
An Act for amending the Edinburgh Tramways Act, 1874, (Note: Edinburgh Tramways Act 1874 (37 & 38 Vict. c. lxviii)) in regard to the lines of Tramways on North Bridge and North Bridge Street, Edinburgh. (Repealed by Edinburgh Corporation Order Confirmation Act 1932 (22 & 23 Geo. 5. c. vii))
Cornwall Minerals Railway Act 1875	38 & 39 Vict. c. cxxix	19 July 1875
An Act for conferring on the Cornwall Minerals Railway Company further powers with respect to the Fal Valley and Temple Mineral Railway Companies; and for other purposes.
Dublin, Wicklow and Wexford Railway Act 1875	38 & 39 Vict. c. cxxx	19 July 1875
An Act to enable the Dublin, Wicklow, and Wexford Railway Company to acquire additional Lands and to construct Works, and to extend the time for the compulsory Purchase of Lands and completion of certain authorised Works, and other matters relating to their Undertaking.
Alford Gas Act 1875	38 & 39 Vict. c. cxxxi	19 July 1875
An Act for dissolving the Alford Gas Company (Limited), for re-incorporating the Proprietors therein with others, and for conferring powers on the Company so to be incorporated; and for other purposes.
Belfast Street Tramways Act 1875	38 & 39 Vict. c. cxxxii	19 July 1875
An Act to authorise the Belfast Street Tramways Company to construct an additional Street Tramway in the county of Down; and for other purposes.
Caledonian Railway (Gordon Street Station Connecting Lines) Act 1875	38 & 39 Vict. c. cxxxiii	19 July 1875
An Act for enabling the Caledonian Railway Company to alter the authorised lines of Railway and Viaduct across the River Clyde for connecting their Railways on the south side of Glasgow with their authorised Station in Gordon Street in that city; and for other purposes.
Great Eastern Railway Act 1875	38 & 39 Vict. c. cxxxiv	19 July 1875
An Act for authorising the Great Eastern Railway Company to make two Junction Railways at and near Norwich, and various improvements of their Railways and Works, and for conferring on them further powers in relation to their Undertaking and the Undertakings of certain other Companies; and for other purposes.
Kilmarnock Water Act 1875	38 & 39 Vict. c. cxxxv	19 July 1875
An Act for authorising the Kilmarnock Water Company to make new Works; to raise additional Capital; and for other purposes.
Blackburn Waterworks Act 1875 (repealed)	38 & 39 Vict. c. cxxxvi	19 July 1875
An Act to empower the Blackburn Waterworks Company to make and maintain additional Waterworks; to raise further Capital; and for other purposes. (Repealed by Blackburn Improvement Act 1882 (45 & 46 Vict. c. ccxliii))
Borrowstounness Town and Harbour Act 1875	38 & 39 Vict. c. cxxxvii	19 July 1875
An Act to provide for the Local Government of the town and further improvement of the town and harbour of Borrowstounness in the county of Linlithgow; and for other purposes.
Cork Harbour Act 1875	38 & 39 Vict. c. cxxxviii	19 July 1875
An Act to grant further powers to the Cork Harbour Commissioners for the Improvement of the Harbour of Cork.
London, Chatham and Dover Railway Act 1875	38 & 39 Vict. c. cxxxix	19 July 1875
An Act for authorising the Sale and Transfer of the Undertaking of the Crystal Palace and South London Junction Railway Company to the London, Chatham, and Dover Railway Company; and for other purposes.
Longwood Gas Act 1875	38 & 39 Vict. c. cxl	19 July 1875
An Act for dissolving and re-incorporating the Longwood Gas Company, and granting powers for supplying with Gas the township of Longwood and certain neighbouring townships and places in the West Riding of the county of York.
Newport (Monmouthshire) Gas Act 1875	38 & 39 Vict. c. cxli	19 July 1875
An Act to authorise the Newport (Monmouthshire) Gas Company to construct further Works and to raise additional Capital; and for other purposes.
Tunbridge Wells Gas Act 1875	38 & 39 Vict. c. cxlii	19 July 1875
An Act to extend the powers of the Tunbridge Wells Gas Company; and for other purposes.
Wednesfield and Wyrley Bank Railway Act 1875 (repealed)	38 & 39 Vict. c. cxliii	19 July 1875
An Act to authorise the construction of a Railway in the county of Stafford from Wednesfield to Wyrley Bank, and for other purposes connected with the said Railway. (Repealed by Wednesfield and Wyrley Bank Railway (Abandonment) Act 1880 (43 & 44 Vict. c. xv))
Worthing Gas Act 1875	38 & 39 Vict. c. cxliv	19 July 1875
An Act to empower the Worthing Gaslight and Coke Company to extend their limits of Supply; to raise additional Capital; and for other purposes.
Felixstowe Railway and Pier Act 1875	38 & 39 Vict. c. cxlv	19 July 1875
An Act for making a Railway and Pier in the county of Suffolk, to be called "The Felixstowe Railway and Pier;" and for other purposes.
Slough Waterworks Act 1875	38 & 39 Vict. c. cxlvi	19 July 1875
An Act for conferring further powers on the Slough Waterworks Company; and for other purposes.
Caledonian Railway (Additional Powers) Act 1875	38 & 39 Vict. c. cxlvii	19 July 1875
An Act for enabling the Caledonian Railway Company to make certain Railways and Roads, to acquire certain Lands, and to exercise other powers, in the counties of Lanark, Renfrew, Forfar, Perth, Edinburgh, and Cumberland; for converting and consolidating certain classes of their shares and stock; for vesting in them the Undertaking of the Alyth Railway Company; and for other purposes.
Midland Great Western, Dublin and Meath, and Navan and Kingscourt Railways Act 1875 (repealed)	38 & 39 Vict. c. cxlviii	19 July 1875
An Act to authorise the Midland Great Western Railway of Ireland Company to purchase or lease the Dublin and Meath and Navan and Kingscourt Railways; and for other purposes. (Repealed by Statute Law (Repeals) Act 2013 (c. 2))
Scarborough Aquarium and Improvement Act 1875	38 & 39 Vict. c. cxlix	19 July 1875
An Act for conferring powers on the Marine Aquarium Company, Scarborough (Limited); and for other purposes.
Dundee Harbour Consolidation Act 1875 (repealed)	38 & 39 Vict. c. cl	19 July 1875
An Act to amend and consolidate the Acts relating to the Harbour of Dundee; to transfer to and vest in the Trustees of the said harbour the lighting and buoying of the River and Firth of Tay; and for other purposes. (Repealed by Dundee Harbour and Tay Ferries Consolidation Act 1911 (1 & 2 Geo. 5. c. lxxx))
Kington and Eardisley Railway Act 1875	38 & 39 Vict. c. cli	19 July 1875
An Act to authorise the Kington and Eardisley Railway Company to maintain their Railway between Titley and Eardisley according to its existing line and levels; to raise further Capital; and for other purposes.
London and North Western Railway (New Lines and Additional Powers) Act 1875	38 & 39 Vict. c. clii	19 July 1875
An Act for conferring additional powers on the London and North-western Railway Company in relation to their own Undertaking and the Undertakings of other Companies; and for other purposes.
London and Saint Katharine Docks Company Act 1875 (repealed)	38 & 39 Vict. c. cliii	19 July 1875
An Act for authorising the London and Saint Katharine Docks Company to construct an Eastern Extension of their Victoria Dock upon lands part of the Victoria Dock Estate originally acquired by the Victoria (London) Dock Company for that purpose, with a new entrance from the River Thames at Galleons Reach; and for other purposes. (Repealed by Port of London (Consolidation) Act 1920 (10 & 11 Geo. 5. c. clxxiii))
Plymouth and Dartmoor Railway (Plymouth Extensions) Act 1875	38 & 39 Vict. c. cliv	19 July 1875
An Act for conferring further powers on the Plymouth and Dartmoor Railway Company for the construction of Works and the raising of Moneys, and otherwise in relation to their Undertaking, and for authorising Agreements between them and other Railway Companies; and for other purposes.
Romford Canal Act 1875	38 & 39 Vict. c. clv	19 July 1875
An Act for making a Canal and collateral Cut in the county of Essex, to be called "The Romford Canal;" and for other purposes.
Whitby, Redcar and Middlesbrough Union Railway Act 1875	38 & 39 Vict. c. clvi	19 July 1875
An Act authorising the Lease and Transfer of the Whitby, Redcar, and Middlesbrough Union Railway to the North-eastern Railway Company; and for other purposes.
European Assurance Society Arbitration Act 1875	38 & 39 Vict. c. clvii	19 July 1875
An Act for amending the European Assurance Society Arbitration Acts, 1872 (Note: European Assurance Society Arbitration Act 1872 (35 & 36 Vict. c. cxlv)) and 1873. (Note: European Assurance Society Arbitration Act 1873 (36 & 37 Vict. c. ix))
Waterford and Central Ireland Railway Act 1875	38 & 39 Vict. c. clviii	19 July 1875
An Act to confer further powers on the Waterford and Central Ireland Railway Company and the Kilkenny Junction Railway Company with reference to their separate and joint Undertakings; and for other purposes.
Hull Street Tramways Act 1875	38 & 39 Vict. c. clix	19 July 1875
An Act to incorporate the Hull Street Tramway Company, and to authorise the Company to acquire Tramways in the borough of Kingston-upon-Hull; to construct other Tramways; and for other purposes.
Leith Harbour and Docks Act 1875 (repealed)	38 & 39 Vict. c. clx	19 July 1875
An Act to consolidate and amend the Acts relating to the Harbour and Docks of Leith, to authorise the construction of a Wet Dock and other Harbour Works, and for other purposes connected therewith. (Repealed by Leith Harbour and Docks Consolidation Order Confirmation Act 1935 (25 & 26 Geo. 5. c. liv))
Manchester Corporation Waterworks and Improvement Act 1875	38 & 39 Vict. c. clxi	19 July 1875
An Act for enabling the Mayor, Aldermen, and Citizens of the City of Manchester, in the county of Lancaster, to extend their Waterworks, and to make Street Improvements; for consolidating the assets and liabilities of the several townships of the city; and for other purposes.
North Union Railway Act 1875	38 & 39 Vict. c. clxii	19 July 1875
An Act for enabling the London and North-western and Lancashire and Yorkshire Railway Companies to make new Railways in connexion with the North Union Railway between Euxton and Preston; and for other purposes.
West Kent Main Sewerage Act 1875	38 & 39 Vict. c. clxiii	19 July 1875
An Act for making better provision for the Sewerage, by means of Main Sewers, of parts of the Lathe of Sutton-at-Hone, in the county of Kent; and for other purposes.
Llanelly and Mynydd Mawr Railway Act 1875	38 & 39 Vict. c. clxiv	19 July 1875
An Act for authorising the construction of a Railway from Llanelly to Mynydd Mawr, in the county of Carmarthen; for conferring powers on the Carmarthenshire Railway or Tramroad Company; and for other purposes.
Tiverton and North Devon Railway Act 1875	38 & 39 Vict. c. clxv	19 July 1875
An Act for the construction of a Railway from Tiverton to the Devon and Somerset Railway at or near Morebath, in the county of Devon; and for other purposes.
South Western Railway Act 1875	38 & 39 Vict. c. clxvi	19 July 1875
An Act for authorising the London and South-western Railway Company to purchase additional Lands, to construct additional Railways and Works, and to raise further Capital; and for confirming an Agreement between that Company and the Great Western Railway Company and the Lords Commissioners of the Admiralty in respect of a Railway to Portland Breakwater; and for other purposes.
Tramways Orders Confirmation Act 1875	38 & 39 Vict. c. clxvii	19 July 1875
An Act for confirming certain Provisional Orders made by the Board of Trade under The Tramways Act, 1870, (Note: Tramways Act 1870 (33 & 34 Vict. c. 78)) relating to the Bristol and Eastern District Tramways and the Manchester Corporation Tramways.
	Bristol and Eastern District Tramways Order 1875	
	Manchester Corporation Tramways Order 1875	
Local Government Board's Poor Law Provisional Orders Confirmation (Oxford, &c.) Act 1875 (repealed)	38 & 39 Vict. c. clxviii	2 August 1875
An Act to confirm certain Provisional Orders made by the Local Government Board under the Poor Law Amendment Act, 1867, (Note: Poor Law Amendment Act 1867 (30 & 31 Vict. c. 106)) with reference to the city of Oxford, the Parish of Stoke-upon-Trent, and the Parishes of Sutton Saint Michael and Sutton Saint Nicholas in the county of Hereford. (Repealed by Statute Law (Repeals) Act 2013 (c. 2))
	Oxford Order 1875	
	Stoke-upon-Trent Order 1875	
	Sutton (Herefordshire) Order 1875	
Gas and Water Orders Confirmation Act 1875	38 & 39 Vict. c. clxix	2 August 1875
An Act for confirming certain Provisional Orders made by the Board of Trade under the Gas and Water Works Facilities Act, 1870, (Note: Gas and Water Works Facilities Act 1870 (33 & 34 Vict. c. 70)) relating to Blackburn Gas, Brighton and Hove Gas, Littlehampton Gas, North Bierley Gas, Weymouth Gas, Wolverhampton Gas, Bognor Water, Newington Water, Newport (Isle of Wight) Water, and Bridgend (Glamorganshire) Gas and Water.
	Blackburn Gas Order 1875	
	Brighton and Hove Gas Order 1875	
	Littlehampton Gas Order 1875	
	North Bierley Gas Order 1875	
	Weymouth Consumers Gas Order 1875	
	Wolverhampton Gas Order 1875	
	Bognor Water Order 1875	
	Newington Water Order 1875	
	Newport (Isle of Wight) Water Order 1875	
	Bridgend (Glamorgan) Gas and Water Order 1875	
Salmon Fishery Act 1873 Provisional Order (Taw and Torridge Salmon Fishery District) Confirmation Act 1875	38 & 39 Vict. c. clxx	2 August 1875
An Act to confirm a Provisional Order made by one of Her Majesty's Principal Secretaries of State in pursuance of the Salmon Fishery Act, 1873, (Note: Salmon Fishery Act 1873 (36 & 37 Vict. c. 71)) relating to the Taw and Torridge Salmon Fishery District.
	Taw and Torridge Salmon Fishery District Order 1875	
General Police and Improvement (Scotland) Act 1862 Orders Confirmation Act 1875	38 & 39 Vict. c. clxxi	2 August 1875
An Act for confirming a Provisional Order made under "The General Police and Improvement (Scotland) Act, 1862," (Note: General Police and Improvement (Scotland) Act 1862 (25 & 26 Vict. c. 101)) relating to the Burgh of Paisley, in the County of Renfrew.
	Paisley Burgh Slaughterhouse Order 1875	
Ecclesiastical Commissioners (Fen Chapels) Act 1875	38 & 39 Vict. c. clxxii	2 August 1875
An Act for transferring to the Ecclesiastical Commissioners for England certain Estates now vested in the Fen Chapel Trustees, and to make the Acts relating to the said Commissioners applicable thereto.
Education Department Provisional Order Confirmation (London) Act 1875	38 & 39 Vict. c. clxxiii	2 August 1875
An Act to confirm a Provisional Order made by the Education Department under "The Elementary Education Act, 1870," to enable the School Board for London to put in force "The Lands Clauses Consolidation Act, 1845," and the Acts amending the same.
	London Order 1875	
Education Department Provisional Order Confirmation (London) Act 1875 (No. 2) or the Education Department Provisional Order Confirmation (London) (No. 2) Act 1875	38 & 39 Vict. c. clxxiv	2 August 1875
An Act to confirm a Provisional Order made by the Education Department under "The Elementary Education Act, 1870," to enable the School Board for London to put in force "The Lands Clauses Consolidation Act, 1845," and the Acts amending the same.
	London Order (2) 1875	
Local Government Board's Provisional Orders Confirmation (Aberdare, &c.) Act 1875	38 & 39 Vict. c. clxxv	2 August 1875
An Act to confirm certain Provisional Orders of the Local Government Board relating to the district of Aberdare, the city and borough of Bath, the districts of Bedlingtonshire, the Buntingford Union, the Cockermouth Union, and Cowpen, the borough of Denbigh, the district of Hucknall Torkard, of the Port Sanitary Authority of Liverpool, and the Districts of Newtown and Llanllwchaiarn, Penarth, Teignmouth, West Ham, Windhill (two), and Worthing.
	Aberdare Order 1875	
	Bath Order 1875	
	Bedlingtonshire Order 1875	
	Buntingford Union Order 1875	
	Cockermouth Union Order 1875	
	Cowpen Order 1875	
	Denbigh Order 1875	
	Hucknall Torkard Order 1875	
	Liverpool Order 1875	
	Newton and Llanllwchaiarn Order 1875	
	Penarth Order 1875	
	Teignmouth Order 1875	
	West Ham Order 1875	
	Windhill Order (1) 1875	
	Windhill Order (2) 1875	
	Worthing Order 1875	
Local Government Board's Provisional Orders Confirmation (Abingdon, &c.) Act 1875	38 & 39 Vict. c. clxxvi	2 August 1875
An Act to confirm certain Provisional Orders of the Local Government Board relating to the Boroughs of Abingdon, Basingstoke, the Districts of Bethesda, Bognor, Bowness, and Colne and Marsden, the Borough of Derby, the Districts of Ebbw Vale, Gildersome, Heston and Isleworth, Hitchin, Malvern, Newport (Salop), the Runcorn Union, Sandown, and Thornhill.
	Abingdon Order 1875 Provisional Order to enable the Urban Sanitary Authority for the Borough of Abingdon to put in force the Compulsory Clauses of the Lands Clauses Consolidation Act, 1845.	
	Basingstoke Order 1875 Provisional Order for altering the Incidence of Charge of Expenses of the Basingstoke Urban Sanitary Authority.	
	Bethesda Order 1875 District of Bethesda.	
	Bognor Order 1875 Provisional Order for amending a Local Act. (Note: Bognor Improvement Act 1835 (5 & 6 Will. 4. c. ci))	
	Bowness Order 1875 Provisional Order to enable the Bowness Local Board to put in force the Compulsory Clauses of the Lands Clauses Consolidation Act, 1845.	
	Colne and Marsden Order 1875 Provisional Order for constituting the Colne and Marsden Urban Sanitary District.	
	Derby Order 1875 Provisional Order to enable the Urban Sanitary Authority for the Borough of Derby to put in force the Compulsory Clauses of the Lands Clauses Consolidation Act, 1845.	
	Ebbw Vale Order 1875 Provisional Order to enable the Ebbw Vale Local Board to put in force the Compulsory Clauses of the Lands Clauses Consolidation Act, 1845.	
	Gildersome Order 1875 Provisional Order for constituting the Gildersome Urban Sanitary District.	
	Heston and Isleworth Order 1875 Provisional Order for constituting the Heston and Isleworth Urban Sanitary District, and for dividing such District into Wards.	
	Hitchin Order 1875 Provisional Order to enable the Hitchin Local Board to put in force the Compulsory Clauses of the Lands Clauses Consolidation Act, 1845.	
	Malvern Order 1875 Provisional Order to enable the Urban Sanitary Authority for the District of Malvern to put in force the Compulsory Clauses of the Lands Clauses Consolidation Act, 1845.	
	Newport Order 1875 Provisional Order for constituting the Newport Urban Sanitary District.	
	Runcorn Union Order 1875 Provisional Order to enable the Rural Sanitary Authority for the Runcorn Union to put in force the Compulsory Clauses of the Lands Clauses Consolidation Act, 1845.	
	Sandown Order 1875 Provisional Order to enable the Urban Sanitary Authority for the District of Sandown to put in force the Compulsory Clauses of the Lands Clauses Consolidation Act, 1845.	
	Thornhill Order 1875 Provisional Order for extending the Local Government District of Thornhill, and for prescribing the number of Members of the Local Board.	
Chelsea Bridge Act 1875	38 & 39 Vict. c. clxxvii	2 August 1875
An Act to amend the Acts relating to Chelsea Bridge.
Birmingham (Corporation) Gas Act 1875 (repealed)	38 & 39 Vict. c. clxxviii	2 August 1875
An Act for effecting the sale and transfer to the Mayor, Aldermen, and Burgesses of the Borough of Birmingham in the county of Warwick, of the Undertakings of the Birmingham Gaslight and Coke Company, and of the Birmingham and Staffordshire Gaslight Company; and for other purposes. (Repealed by West Midlands County Council Act 1980 (c. xi))
Metropolitan Board of Works (Various Powers) Act 1875	38 & 39 Vict. c. clxxix	2 August 1875
An Act for authorising Improvements in and near the Precinct of the Savoy and near Charing Cross with a view to the opening of better communication with the Victoria Embankment, and for conferring powers on the Metropolitan Board of Works with reference to Tooting Graveney Common; and for other purposes.
Oldham Corporation Water Act 1875	38 & 39 Vict. c. clxxx	2 August 1875
An Act to authorise the Mayor, Aldermen, and Burgesses of the Borough of Oldham in the county palatine of Lancaster to abandon and relinquish the construction of certain of the Reservoirs and other Works authorised by "The Oldham Corporation Waterworks Act, 1870," (Note: Oldham Corporation Waterworks, &c. Act 1870 (33 & 34 Vict. c. cxliv)) and to make and maintain other Waterworks; and for other purposes.
South Eastern Railway Act 1875	38 & 39 Vict. c. clxxxi	2 August 1875
An Act to confer upon the South-eastern Railway Company further powers with respect to their own Undertaking, and the Undertakings of certain other Companies; and for other purposes.
West Lancashire Railway Act 1875	38 & 39 Vict. c. clxxxii	2 August 1875
An Act for conferring further powers on the West Lancashire Railway Company for the construction of works and the raising of money, and otherwise in relation to their Undertaking.
Teign Valley Railway (Extension) Act 1875	38 & 39 Vict. c. clxxxiii	2 August 1875
An Act for authorising the Teign Valley Railway Company to make an extension of their Railway to the North Devon Railway at Crediton; and to raise further moneys; and for authorising agreements between them and other Railway Companies; and for other purposes.
Carmarthen and Cardigan Railway (Arrangement) Act 1875	38 & 39 Vict. c. clxxxiv	2 August 1875
An Act for regulating the affairs of the Carmarthen and Cardigan Railway Company; and for other purposes.
Milford Docks Act 1875	38 & 39 Vict. c. clxxxv	2 August 1875
An Act for authorising alterations in the design of the authorised works of the Milford Docks Company; and for other purposes.
South Staffordshire Waterworks Act 1875	38 & 39 Vict. c. clxxxvi	2 August 1875
An Act to authorise the South Staffordshire Waterworks Company to extend their works and limits of supply; and for other purposes.
Cardiff Improvement Act 1875	38 & 39 Vict. c. clxxxvii	2 August 1875
An Act to extend the Borough of Cardiff, in the county of Glamorgan, and to enable the Mayor, Aldermen, and Burgesses thereof to construct new streets and other works; and to purchase the Cardiff Waterworks; and to make further provisions for the improvement of the Borough; and for other purposes.
Birmingham (Corporation) Water Act 1875 or the Birmingham Corporation Act 1875 (repealed)	38 & 39 Vict. c. clxxxviii	2 August 1875
An Act for empowering the Mayor, Aldermen, and Burgesses of the Borough of Birmingham, in the county of Warwick, to purchase the Undertaking of the Company of Proprietors of the Birmingham Waterworks; and for other purposes. (Repealed by Birmingham Corporation (Consolidation) Act 1883 (46 & 47 Vict. c. lxx))
Wigan Junction Railways Act 1875	38 & 39 Vict. c. clxxxix	2 August 1875
An Act for amending and extending the Wigan Junction Railways Act, 1874, (Note: Wigan Junction Railways Act 1874 (37 & 38 Vict. c. cxvii)) for authorising the construction of additional Railways in Lancashire; and for other purposes.
Channel Tunnel Company Act 1875 (repealed)	38 & 39 Vict. c. cxc	2 August 1875
An Act to empower the Channel Tunnel Company (Limited) to acquire certain lands in the parish of Saint Margaret at Cliffe in the county of Kent. (Repealed by Statute Law (Repeals) Act 1989 (c. 43))
Whitehaven, Cleator and Egremont Railway Act 1875	38 & 39 Vict. c. cxci	2 August 1875
An Act to authorise the Whitehaven, Cleator, and Egremont Railway Company to make a branch to Gilgarran, and a deviation at Frizington, in the county of Cumberland, and other works; to raise further capital; and for other purposes.
Campbell's Sewage Patent Act 1875	38 & 39 Vict. c. cxcii	2 August 1875
An Act for rendering valid certain Letters Patent granted to Dugald Campbell for an improved process for the treatment of sewage, and the production of manures therefrom.
Local Government Board's Provisional Orders Confirmation (Leyton, &c.) Act 1875	38 & 39 Vict. c. cxciii	11 August 1875
An Act to confirm certain Provisional Orders of the Local Government Board relating to the Districts of Leyton and Redditch, and the Borough of Totnes.
	Leyton Order 1875 Provisional Order for extending the Local Government District of Leyton.	
	Redditch Order 1875 Provisional Order for extending the Local Government District of Redditch, and for prescribing the number of members of the Local Board.	
	Totnes Order 1875 Provisional Order for altering the Incidence of Charge of Expenses of the Totnes Urban Sanitary Authority.	
Annual Turnpike Acts Continuance Act 1875 (repealed)	38 & 39 Vict. c. cxciv	11 August 1875
An Act to continue certain Turnpike Acts in Great Britain, and to repeal certain other Turnpike Acts; and for other purposes connected therewith. (Repealed by Statute Law (Repeals) Act 1981 (c. 19))
Dublin Traffic Act 1875	38 & 39 Vict. c. cxcv	11 August 1875
An Act for regulating the Traffic in the City of Dublin, and certain other parts of the Police District of Dublin Metropolis; and for other purposes relating thereto.
Ely and Bury St. Edmunds (Light) Railway Act 1875 (repealed)	38 & 39 Vict. c. cxcvi	11 August 1875
An Act for making a Railway from Ely in the county of Cambridge, to Bury Saint Edmunds in the county of Suffolk; and for other purposes. (Repealed by Ely and Bury St. Edmunds Railway (Abandonment) Act 1880 (43 & 44 Vict. c. xix))
Sligo, Leitrim and Northern Counties Railway Act 1875	38 & 39 Vict. c. cxcvii	11 August 1875
An Act for making a Railway from the Midland Great Western Railway of Ireland, near the town of Ballysadare in the county of Sligo, through the counties of Leitrim and Cavan, to the Irish North Western Railway, near the town of Enniskillen in the county of Fermanagh; and for other purposes.
Cambrian Railways Act 1875	38 & 39 Vict. c. cxcviii	11 August 1875
An Act for making better provision for settlement of differences between the Coast Section and the Inland Section of the Cambrian Railways Company; and for other purposes.
Sion College Act 1875 (repealed)	38 & 39 Vict. c. cxcix	11 August 1875
An Act for enabling the President and Fellows of Sion College, within the City of London, to grant Building and Improving Leases of certain Lands in the said City, and to sell the same Lands and to acquire other Lands, and for carrying into effect an arrangement relating to Sion Hospital; and for other purvoses. (Repealed by Sion College Act 1956 (4 & 5 Eliz. 2. c. li))
Commercial Gas Act 1875	38 & 39 Vict. c. cc	11 August 1875
An Act for conferring further powers on the Commercial Gas Company, and for the Amalgamation with that Company of the Ratcliff Gaslight and Coke Company; and for other purposes.
Galway, Oughterard and Clifden Railway Act 1875	38 & 39 Vict. c. cci	11 August 1875
An Act for granting further powers to the Galway, Oughterard, and Clifden Railway Company.
Metropolitan and South Western Junction Railway Act 1875	38 & 39 Vict. c. ccii	11 August 1875
An Act to extend the time granted by "The Metropolitan and South-western Junction Railway Act, 1872," (Note: Metropolitan and South Western Junction Railway Act 1872 (35 & 36 Vict. c. cxc)) for the purchase of Lands.
Sevenoaks, Maidstone and Tonbridge Railway Act 1875	38 & 39 Vict. c. cciii	11 August 1875
An Act for conferring further powers on the Sevenoaks, Maidstone, and Tunbridge Railway Company; for the purchase of Lands and the raising of Money, and other wise in relation to their Undertaking; and for other purposes.
Barrow-in-Furness Corporation Act 1875	38 & 39 Vict. c. cciv	11 August 1875
An Act for extending the boundaries of the borough of Barrow-in-Furness, and for empowering the Corporation to construct additional Waterworks and Gasworks; and for defining and extending the powers of the Corporation in relation to the management of Streets, the regulation of Buildings, the improvement of the Borough, and other matters of Local Government; and for other purposes.
Ely and Newmarket Railway Act 1875	38 & 39 Vict. c. ccv	11 August 1875
An Act for making Railways from the Great Eastern Railway at Ely to the Great Eastern Railway at Newmarket; and for other purposes.
Regent's Canal and Dock Act 1875 (repealed)	38 & 39 Vict. c. ccvi	11 August 1875
An Act for incorporating the Regent's Canal and Dock Company; for the transfer to them of the Undertaking of the Regent's Canal Company; for authorising the construction of works; for improving and providing additional accommodation in connexion with that Undertaking; and for other purposes. (Repealed by Grand Union Canal Act 1943 (6 & 7 Geo. 6. c. v))
Sutton Bridge Dock Act 1875	38 & 39 Vict. c. ccvii	11 August 1875
An Act for incorporating a Company, and authorising them to make and maintain a Dock and other works at Sutton Bridge; and for other purposes.
Metropolitan District Railway Act 1875	38 & 39 Vict. c. ccviii	11 August 1875
An Act enabling the Metropolitan District Railway Company to connect their railway at Hammersmith with the London and South-western Railway; and for other purposes connected with their Undertaking.
North Dublin Street Tramways Act 1875	38 & 39 Vict. c. ccix	11 August 1875
An Act to authorise the construction of Tramways in and near the City of Dublin, and for other purposes.
Derry Central Railway Act 1875	38 & 39 Vict. c. ccx	11 August 1875
An Act for making certain Railways between the Town of Magherafelt in the county of Londonderry, and the Town of Coleraine in the same county; and for other purposes.
Local Government Board's Provisional Orders Confirmation (Abingdon, Barnsley, &c.) Act 1875	38 & 39 Vict. c. ccxi	13 August 1875
An Act to confirm certain Provisional Orders of the Local Government Board relating to the Boroughs of Abingdon and Barnsley, the District of Bradford (Wilts), the Boroughs of Colchester, Daventry, and Deal, the Evesham Union, the Borough of King's Lynn, the Districts of Kirkby Lonsdale and Leigh, the Mitford and Launditch Union, the Boroughs of Nottingham, Hastings, and Stafford, the Stockton Union, the Borough of Sudbury, and the District of Todmorden.
	Abingdon Order (2) 1875 Provisional Order for altering the Incidence of Charge of Expenses of the Abingdon Urban Sanitary Authority.	
	Barnsley Order 1875 Provisional Order to enable the Urban Sanitary Authority for the Borough of Barnsley, to put in force the Compulsory Clauses of the Lands Clauses Consolidation Act, 1845.	
	Bradford-upon-Avon Order 1875 Provisional Order for partially repealing and altering a Local Act. (Note: Bradford (Wiltshire) Improvement Act 1839 (2 & 3 Vict. c. lxiii))	
	Colchester Order 1875 Provisional Order for altering the Incidence of Charge of Expenses of the Colchester Urban Sanitary Authority.	
	Daventry Order 1875 Provisional Order for altering the Incidence of Charge of Expenses of the Daventry Urban Sanitary Authority.	
	Deal Order 1875 Provisional Order for altering the Incidence of Charge of Expenses of the Deal Urban Sanitary Authority and for partially repealing and altering a Local Act. (Note: Deal Improvement Act 1812 (52 Geo. 3. c. lxxiii))	
	Evesham Order 1875 Provisional Order to enable the Rural Sanitary Authority for the Evesham Union to put in force the Compulsory Clauses of the Lands Clauses Consolidation Act, 1845.	
	King's Lynn Order 1875 Provisional Order for altering the Incidence of Charge of Expenses of the King's Lynn Urban Sanitary Authority.	
	Kirkby Lonsdale Order 1875 rovisional Order to enable the Urban Sanitary Authority for the District of Kirkby Lonsdale to put in force the Compulsory Clauses of the Lands Clauses Consolidation Act, 1845.	
	Leigh Order 1875 Provisional Order for dissolving the Local Government Districts of Bedford, Pennington, and West Leigh; and for other purposes.	
	Launditch Order 1875 Provisional Order to enable the Rural Sanitary Authority for the Mitford and Launditch Union to put in force the Compulsory Clauses of the Lands Clauses Consolidation Act, 1845.	
	Nottingham Order 1875 Provisional Order to enable the Urban Sanitary Authority for the Borough of Nottingham, to put in force the Compulsory Clauses of the Lands Clauses Consolidation Act, 1845.	
	Hastings Order 1875 Provisional Order for dissolving the St. Leonard Improvement Act (Note: St. Leonards Improvement Act 1832 (2 & 3 Will. 4. c. xlv)) District.	
	Stafford Order 1875 Provisional Order for dissolving the Stafford Improvement Act (Note: Stafford Improvement Act 1830 (11 Geo. 4 & 1 Will. 4. c. xliv)) District, and for repealing a Local Act.	
	Wolviston Special Drainage District Order 1875 Provisional Order for dissolving the Wolviston Special Drainage District.	
	Sudbury Order 1875 Provisional Order for altering the Incidence of Charge of Expenses of the Sudbury Urban Sanitary Authority.	
	Todmorden Order 1875 Provisional Order for dissolving the Local Government Districts of Cornholme and Todmorden, and for other purposes.	
Ramsey and Somersham Junction Railway Act 1875	38 & 39 Vict. c. ccxii	13 August 1875
An Act to incorporate a Company for making a Railway from the Holme and Ramsey Railway at Ramsey, to the Great Eastern Railway at Somersham; and for other purposes.
South Dublin Railway Act 1875	38 & 39 Vict. c. ccxiii	13 August 1875
An Act for making a Railway to connect the Railways on the south side of Dublin; and for other purposes.
Stroud Water Act 1875	38 & 39 Vict. c. ccxiv	13 August 1875
An Act for incorporating the Stroud Water Company, and for conferring powers on that Company; and for other purposes.
Burntisland Harbour Act 1875 (repealed)	38 & 39 Vict. c. ccxv	13 August 1875
An Act to confer further powers on the Magistrates and Council of the Royal Burgh of Burntisland, with reference to the Harbour of Burntisland; and for other purposes. (Repealed by Forth Ports Authority Order Confirmation Act 1969 (c. xxxiv))

=== Private acts ===
Short title	Citation	Royal assent
Long title
Cornwallis Estate Act 1875	38 & 39 Vict. c. 1 Pr.	2 August 1875
An Act to amend and extend the Cornwallis Estate Act, 1870. (Note: Cornwallis Estate Act 1870 (33 & 34 Vict. c. 3 Pr.))
Paget's Settled Estates Act 1875	38 & 39 Vict. c. 2 Pr.	2 August 1875
An Act for authorising the working and granting Leases of the Mines and Minerals under the Settled Estates devised by the Will of Charles Paget, late of Ruddington Grange, in the County of Nottingham, deceased; and for other purposes.
Leigh Estate Act 1875	38 & 39 Vict. c. 3 Pr.	2 August 1875
An Act to vest in Trustees powers to grant Building and other Leases of and to sell and exchange the Estates devised by the Will of John Gerard Leigh, Esquire, decease, and to give other powers to such Trustees for the management and improvement of such Estates; and for other purposes.
Paddington Estate Act 1875	38 & 39 Vict. c. 4 Pr.	2 August 1875
An Act for extending the powers exerciseable by virtue of "The Paddington Estate Act, 1871," (Note: Paddington Estate Act 1871 (34 & 35 Vict. c. 5 Pr.)) and the therein recited Acts by the Lessees of the Estate, with the consent of the Ecclesiastical Commissioners for England, of granting Building or Repairing Leases, and of accepting surrenders of existing Leases of four hundred acres, part of the Estate (and of granting new Leases in lieu of the surrendered Leases), by enabling Agreements to be made with the Commissioners for leasing or otherwise dealing with the excess of acreage over the four hundred acres.
Lord Windsor's Estate Act 1875	38 & 39 Vict. c. 5 Pr.	11 August 1875
An Act for authorising the raising of Money on the Security of Estates in the County of Glamorgan, settled by the Will of the Right Honourable Other Archer, late Earl of Plymouth, deceased, (Note: Other Windsor, 6th Earl of Plymouth) and the application of the Money for the Improvement of parts of the Estates, in order to render them available as Building Lands, and for extending the power of granting Mineral Leases conferred by the said Will; and for other purposes.
Glenuiag Estate Act 1875	38 & 39 Vict. c. 6 Pr.	11 August 1875
An Act to authorise the sale of certain portions of the Forest of Monar, called the Grazings and Shealings of Glenuiack (otherwise Glenuiag) and Pollanbuy, in the county of Ross, being part of the entailed Estates now held by Sir Arthur George Ramsay Mackenzie, of Coul, Baronet, and to authorise the purchase of other Lands to be entailed; and for other purposes.
Charles Sheils' Charity Act 1875	38 & 39 Vict. c. 7 Pr.	11 August 1875
An Act for amending "Charles Sheils' Almshouses Charity Act, 1864," (Note: Charles Sheils' Almshouses Charity Act 1864 (27 & 28 Vict. c. 8 Pr.)) and "Charles Sheils' Almshouses Charity Act, 1866." (Note: Charles Sheils' Almshouses Charity Act 1866 (29 & 30 Vict. c. 9 Pr.))

=== Sources ===
- The Public General Statutes Passed in the Thirty-Eighth and Thirty-Ninth Years of the Reign of Her Majesty Queen Victoria; 1875. London: Eyre and Spottiswoode. 1875 – via HathiTrust.
- The Public General Statutes Passed in the Thirty-Eighth and Thirty-Ninth Years of the Reign of Her Majesty Queen Victoria; 1875. London: Eyre and Spottiswoode. 1875 – via Google Books.
- Local and Personal Laws – via Google Books.

== See also ==
- List of acts of the Parliament of the United Kingdom
