= Agricultural Holdings (England) Act 1875 =

Act of the Parliament of the United Kingdom

Agricultural Holdings (England) Act 1875 (Note: Section 1.)
- Act of Parliament
- Parliament of the United Kingdom
- Long title: An Act for amending the Law relating to Agricultural Holdings in England.
- Citation: 38 & 39 Vict. c. 92
- Territorial extent: England and Wales (Note: Section 3.)

Dates
- Royal assent: 13 August 1875
- Commencement: 14 February 1876 (Note: Section 2.)
- Repealed: 1 January 1884
Other legislation
Amended by	Agricultural Holdings (England) Act (1875) Amendment Act 1876
Repealed by	Agricultural Holdings (England) Act 1883

Status: Repealed

Text of statute as originally enacted

The Agricultural Holdings (England) Act 1875 (38 & 39 Vict. c. 92) was an act of the Parliament of the United Kingdom passed by Benjamin Disraeli's Conservative government.

The act provided a list of improvements for whose unexhausted value a departing tenant farmer could claim compensation from the landlord. These were divided into three types. First, the more expensive improvements (such as a new building or a new orchard) needed the landlord's permission if they were to be liable for compensation. Second, improvements that the tenant had informed the landlord he was going to undertake (such as draining land or liming). Third, improvements which the tenant could be compensated for without having to give prior notice to the landlord (temporary improvements such as cultivation and manuring).

However, the act was not compulsory and so landlords could contract out of it. The Liberal MP Edward Knatchbull-Hugessen complained in the House of Commons: "This Bill allowed everybody to do exactly what he could do at present without it, and compelled no one to do anything which he had not hitherto done and did not wish to do. All that the bill did was to give an indication of the course which the Legislature thought ought to be pursued, but which Her Majesty's Government had not the courage to say should be carried out". In 1883 William Gladstone's Liberal government passed an act that made compensation compulsory.

== Subsequent developments ==
The whole act was repealed by section 62 of the Agricultural Holdings (England) Act 1883 (46 & 47 Vict. c. 61), which came into force on 1 January 1884.

== Bibliography ==
- Henry Winch. Agricultural Holdings Act: with Exposition, Appendix, Notes and Forms. Weldon & Co. Bedford Street, Covent Garden, London. 1875. Internet Archive.
- Frederick Clifford, "The Agricultural Holdings (England) Act 1875" (1876) 12 Journal of the Royal Agricultural Society 129. Reprinted as a treatise.
- Hugh William Pearson. The Agricultural Holdings (England) Act, 1875, 38 and 39 Vict., cap. 92: with Explanatory Notes and Forms for the Use of Farmers and Land Agents. Second Edition. Kent. 1876. Catalogue.
- Herbert G Sweet and John Nicholson. "Agricultural Holdings Act 1875". A Complete Catalogue of Modern Law Books, British, American and Colonial. Henry Sweet. Chancery Lane, London. 1882. p 379.
