= Agricultural Holdings (England) Act 1883 =

Act of the Parliament of the United Kingdom

Agricultural Holdings (England) Act 1883 (Note: Section 63.)
- Act of Parliament
- Parliament of the United Kingdom
- Long title: An Act for amending the Law relating to Agricultural Holdings in England.
- Citation: 46 & 47 Vict. c. 61
- Territorial extent: England and Wales (Note: Section 64.)

Dates
- Royal assent: 25 August 1883
- Commencement: 1 January 1884 (Note: Section 53.)
- Repealed: 1 January 1909
Other legislation
Amends	Distress for Rent Act 1689
Repeals/revokes	Agricultural Holdings (England) Act 1875
Repealed by	Agricultural Holdings Act 1908
Relates to	Agricultural Holdings (Scotland) Act 1883

Status: Repealed

Text of statute as originally enacted

The Agricultural Holdings (England) Act 1883 (46 & 47 Vict. c. 61) was an act of the Parliament of the United Kingdom passed by William Ewart Gladstone's Liberal government.

The Agricultural Holdings (England) Act 1875 (38 & 39 Vict. c. 92) had provided a list of improvements for whose unexhausted value a departing tenant farmer could claim compensation from the landlord. However, compensation was not compulsory and so many landlords contracted out of the act's provisions. The 1883 act made compensation for the tenants' improvements compulsory and according to F. M. L. Thompson "marked for the first time the compulsory intervention of the law in the supposedly voluntarily bargains made between tenants and landlord".

The act came into force in 1885.

== Subsequent developments ==
The whole act was repealed by section 49 of, and the fourth schedule to, the Agricultural Holdings Act 1908 (8 Edw. 7. c. 28), which came into force on 1 January 1909.
