= Trustee Savings Bank =

British financial institution

TSB Bank plc
- Final logo, used from 1984 to 1999
- Type: Public
- Industry: Financial Services
- Founded: 1810 (TSB Group Plc 1985)
- Defunct: December 1995 (Merged with Lloyds)
- Fate: Merger with Lloyds Bank Plc, December 1995
- Successor: Lloyds TSB Bank Plc; TSB Bank plc
- Headquarters: 60 Lombard St. London EC3, latterly Victoria House, Victoria Square, Birmingham B1 1BZ
- Products: Retail banking
- Subsidiaries: TSB Bank Scotland Plc
- Website: web.archive.org/web/19980122133506/http://www.tsb.co.uk/ (archived)

The Trustee Savings Bank (TSB) was a British financial institution that operated between 1810 and 1995 when it was merged with Lloyds Bank. Trustee savings banks originated to accept savings deposits from those with moderate means. Their shares were not traded on the stock market but, unlike mutually held building societies, depositors had no voting rights; nor did they have the power to direct the financial and managerial goals of the organisation. Directors were appointed as trustees (hence the name) on a voluntary basis. The first trustee savings bank was established by the Rev. Henry Duncan of Ruthwell in Dumfriesshire for his poorest parishioners in 1810, with its sole purpose being to serve the local people in the community. Between 1970 and 1985, the various trustee savings banks in the United Kingdom were amalgamated into a single institution named TSB Group plc, which was floated on the London Stock Exchange. In 1995, the TSB merged with Lloyds Bank to form Lloyds TSB, at that point the largest bank in the UK by market share and the second-largest (to HSBC, which had taken over the Midland Bank in 1992) by market capitalisation.

In 2009, following its acquisition of HBOS, Lloyds TSB Group was renamed Lloyds Banking Group, although the TSB initials initially survived in the names of its principal retail subsidiaries, Lloyds TSB Bank and Lloyds TSB Scotland. In July 2012 however, it was announced that the TSB brand would be resurrected by Lloyds Banking Group for the 632 branches it would divest as a separate business. The new TSB Bank began operations in September 2013 and was divested via an initial public offering in 2014, with the remainder of the business reverting to the Lloyds Bank name.

== History ==
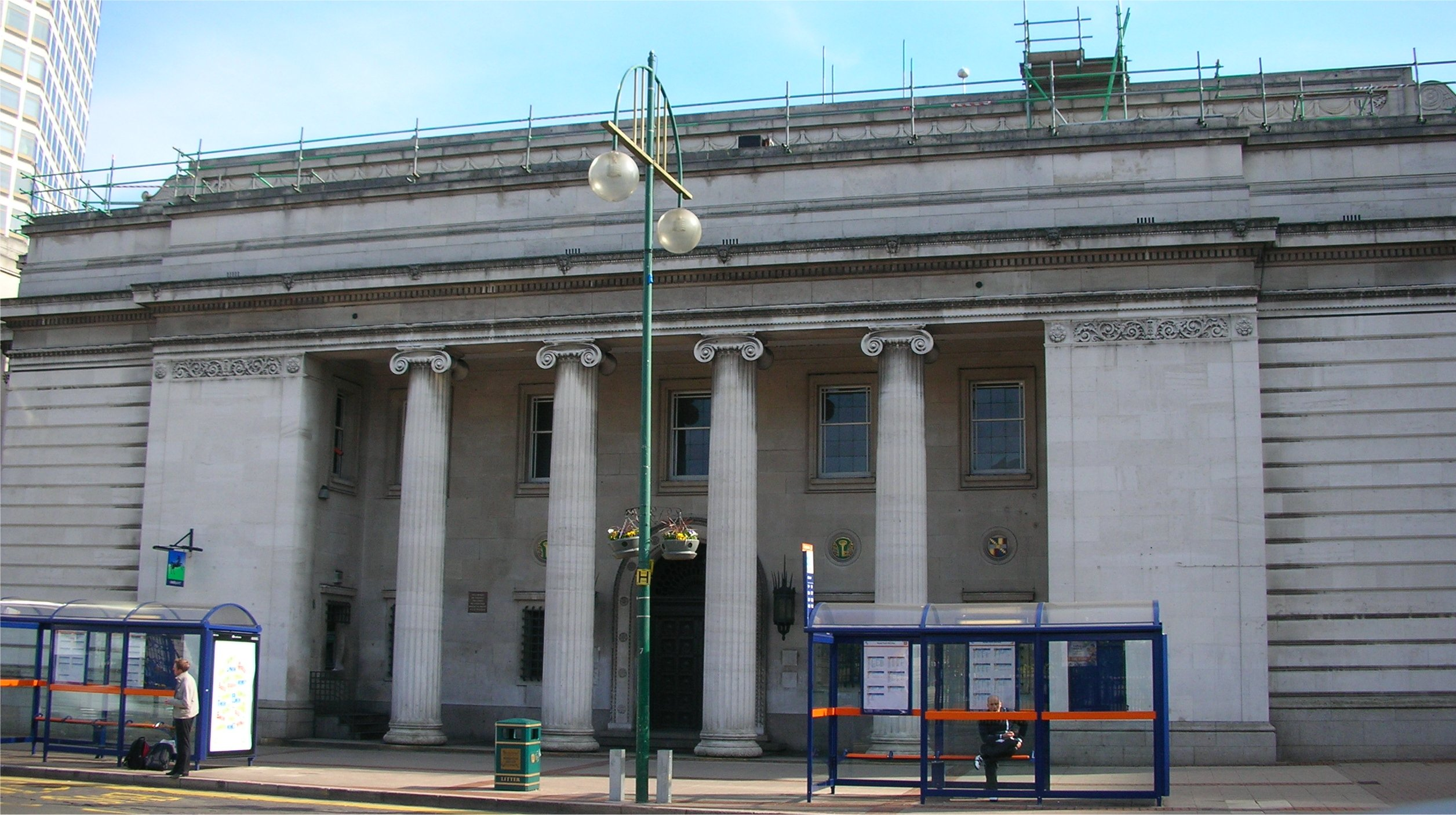
The Birmingham branch on Broad Street, originally the Birmingham Municipal Bank, designed by Thomas Cecil Howitt and opened by the Prince George in 1933.

=== Early history of the trustee savings banks ===
From the outset, savings banks were retail finance institutions set up under democratic and philanthropic principles. They sought to create thrifty habits amongst small and medium-sized savers such as craftsmen, domestic servants or the growing proletariat, who were outside the well-to-do market that the commercial banks served.

In the first half of the 19th century, bank runs or bank collapses were common, so savings banks had no safe outlet for their own deposits. To create trust among potential depositors, the Savings Bank (England) Act 1817 (57 Geo. 3. c. 130) required funds to be invested in government bonds or deposited at the Bank of England. This requirement was extended to Scottish savings banks by the Savings Bank Act 1835 (5 & 6 Will. 4. c. 57). From then on, regulation of savings banks in the UK was quite detailed, with several periods of "ill-health" and lack of trust in their capacity resulting in government intervention in most aspects of the operation and day-to-day management of savings banks, particularly the nature of their investment portfolios.

An essential feature of a savings bank in the UK was that depositors should have a guarantee of the nominal value of their savings, so that these could be withdrawn at their full value with interest no matter how long the deposit. Funds would be under control of voluntary managers or trustees, hence the roots of the name. This guarantee could not be achieved unless funds were held in securities with a similar guarantee. As a result of the Savings Bank (England) Act 1817, all money received by trustee savings banks, other than that needed to deal with everyday transactions, was held by the Bank of England to the credit of the National Debt Commissioners. The act specified duties of the treasurers, managers and trustees of the savings banks, none of whom was to derive any benefit from their office. This feature was to dominate the management of the TSBs until the 1970s.

Savings banks paying interest on deposits (at a rate ranging from 3% to 5%) proliferated. The number of successful institutions in the UK grew until there were 645 in 1861. Their business remained in collecting low-volume deposits, as early attempts at market diversification had been curtailed by the Savings Bank Act 1891.

=== Modern history of the trustee savings banks ===
By the inter-war years it had become clear that trustee savings banks could compete in the retail bank market. By 1919 the sum of cash and assets held on deposit for all the TSBs reached £100 million, which rose to £162 million in 1929 and £292 million in 1939.

From the 1970s the Irish trustee savings banks followed a similar path of amalgamation to their UK counterparts, becoming, in 1992, a single entity; this was purchased by Irish Life and Permanent in 2002.

Together, the TSBs were as big as any of the four main London clearing banks. There was little competition between the various trustee savings banks. Each individual trustee savings bank served a separate geographic area, although other organisations competed with them, and this competition grew stronger after 1945.

In 1955, inter-savings-bank clearing was extended to the whole country. Such a system had been in operation in Surrey in the south of England for a short time, and it had been proven successful in helping to settle transactions between different savings banks and in improving the service to clients (particularly when on holiday within the UK). Also in 1955, increased competition for deposits (and most notably the growing popularity of hire purchase) led to calls for the Trustee Savings Banks Association to ask the Exchequer and the National Debt Commissioners to allow withdrawals by cheque (as originally proposed in 1926 by W. A. Barclay of the Perth Savings Bank). In 1965 a review of retail credit markets led to the trustee savings banks being allowed to issue current accounts (with cheque withdrawals but no overdraft facilities), undertake the payment of utility bills, and safeguard securities and valuables. Accordingly, the TSB Trust Company was established in 1967 and a year later the first unit trust issue was offered.

Regulatory innovations which allowed the TSBs to diversify their business threatened to erode the deposit base of the clearing banks. But this potential diversification was limited by the restrictive central control of the Exchequer, the National Debt Commissioners and the Trustee Savings Bank Inspection Committee. This type of central control had been designed both to guarantee depositors that the savings banks would remain a secure alternative for their deposits and, by standardising general interest rates and regulations, to make it possible for local trustees to work autonomously.

By the early 1960s transactions at retail counters were increasing at around 5% per annum. In 1964 the London Trustee Savings Bank was the first to computerise standing orders, and all account records were put on computer by 1967 – this being the first UK bank to do so. Some other savings banks still worked with leather-bound ledgers, and others used passbooks; either way handwritten record cards piled up in thousands and even the most basic management information and accounting (such as the annual balance sheet) was a huge task to compile, requiring a lot of overtime. The savings banks' administration was thus antiquated and time-consuming. They needed modernization and streamlining.

=== Amalgamation into a single entity ===
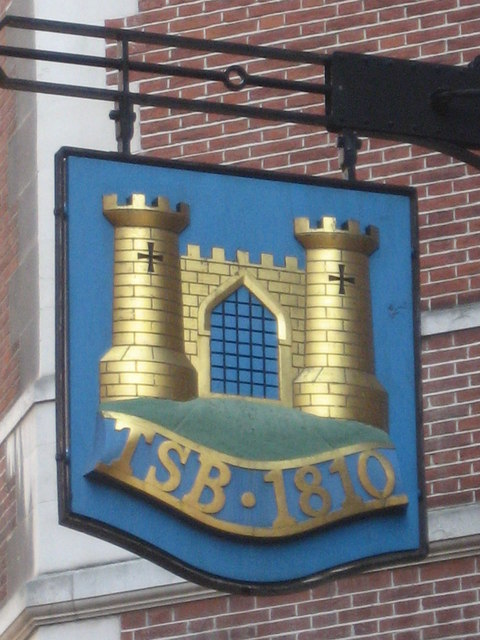
The TSB sign at the former Lombard Street headquarters in the City of London.

In 1970 there were 75 savings banks in a loose association, with £2,806 million in total assets. There was a wide variation in size: five of the banks each had over £100m in assets (together accounting for 25% of the total), 14 had between £50m and £100m (35%), 39 between £10m and £50m (38%) and 17 under £10m (2%). The largest trustee savings banks were based in London, Glasgow, Edinburgh and Belfast. Those based in the north of England accounted for 50% of total funds, while those in the south of England and Wales accounted for 27%, those in Scotland for 19% and those in Northern Ireland for less than 5%. Geographical location of the 1,655 trustee savings bank branches was also unevenly distributed, with branch density higher in parts of Scotland and the north of England. In 1978 there was one savings bank branch per 18,000 persons in Scotland, but only one per 75,000 persons in London. There was a similar pattern for individual accounts, with two out of five persons in Scotland having an account at a trustee savings bank, one out of five in the north of England, but only one out of twenty in London and the Home Counties.

In 1973 at the time of the report by the Page Committee, there were still 73 TSBs and 1,549 branch offices. Eight years had passed since the introduction of cheque accounts. The TSBs sensed the need to respond to changing customer needs. However some individual TSBs had grown faster than others. The assets of the Scottish TSBs, traditionally the strongest members of the TSB movement, had been growing more slowly than those in Lancashire, Yorkshire, the Midlands, Wales and the West Country, which had built up enviable reserves and were anxious to protect their territories. London and southern England remained the areas where the savings banks had little presence.

While savings banks and government were considering the movement's future organisational structure and functions as well as those of individual TSBs, the TSBs remained restricted in what services they could offer: they could not give loans to their customers, and there were still limits on how funds could be invested. At this critical stage, the Page Committee recommended that the TSBs be freed from government control, allowed to develop their service range, and thus become a third force in banking.

These recommendations were high on the agenda of the newly elected government of Harold Wilson. But the pace of change was to be slow. Officials at the Bank of England, with the support of Sir Athelstan Caröe, then chairman of the Trustee Savings Banks Association, called for the establishment of a strong central authority to assume many of the control powers vested in the government, bearing in mind the need to build up adequate capital reserves virtually from scratch. For the government, there was an advantage in widening the TSBs' investment powers only slowly, not least the threat of competition to its own newly created bank, National Girobank.

TSBs actively computerised their administration. Two companies were set up in 1972 in preparation for future change: TSB Computer Services Ltd., co-ordinated all computer systems and related developments, and Central Trustee Savings Bank Ltd. dealt with volume transactions.

Trustee Savings Banks Act 1976 (Note: Section 38(1).)
- Act of Parliament
- Parliament of the United Kingdom
- Long title: An Act to establish a Trustee Savings Banks Central Board; to confer wider powers on trustee savings banks; to transfer to the Registrar of Friendly Societies certain functions previously exercised by other persons; and for purposes connected therewith.
- Citation: 1976 c. 4
- Territorial extent: United Kingdom

Dates
- Royal assent: 25 March 1976
- Commencement: various (Note: Section 38(3)–(6).)
- Repealed: 30 January 1982
Other legislation
Amends	Pensions Commutation Act 1871; Pensions (Increase) Act 1971; National Debt Act 1972
Amended by	Building Societies Act 1986
Repealed by	Trustee Savings Banks Act 1981

Status: Repealed

Text of statute as originally enacted

The Trustee Savings Banks Act 1976 (c. 4) allowed TSBs to offer services equivalent to those of the clearing banks, but it also required that, in the space of one year, the number of independent TSBs was reduced from 73 to 19, under the central co-ordinating authority of the TSB Central Board.

The 19 banks were:

- Aberdeen Savings Bank
- Birmingham Municipal TSB
- TSB of the Channel Islands
- TSB of Eastern England
- TSB of Lancashire and Cumbria
- TSB of Leicester and Nottingham
- TSB of Mid-Lancashire and Merseyside
- TSB of the Midlands
- TSB North East
- TSB of Northern Ireland
- North Staffordshire TSB
- TSB North West Central Region
- TSB South East
- TSB of South Scotland
- South West TSB
- TSB of Tayside and Central Scotland
- TSB of Wales and Border Counties
- West of Scotland TSB
- TSB of Yorkshire and Lincoln

This organisational framework for savings banks was in place between 1976 and 1984, a period during which TSB management undertook a series of fundamental changes while pursuing the creation of independent and profitable financial services group.

Tom Bryans, general manager of the Northern Ireland Trustee Savings Bank, was the first chief executive of the newly amalgamated trustee savings banks. He was in his mid-50s, and had spent all his working life at the TSB movement, becoming a manager in 1956 and then becoming an expert in computerised banking. Bryans took the helm with a mandate to turn the savings banks from a quasi-government body into successful independent providers, but his salary of £17,000 per annum was well below those paid at similar posts at clearing banks.

The amalgamation of individual TSBs into purposely created regional banks and the establishment of a central board in 1975 provided the resources to support the introduction of personal lending in 1977. However, attempts to diversify across retail bank markets failed. Together with the National Giro Bank and the Co-operative Bank, the efforts of the TSBs to penetrate retail finance from scratch in 1971 resulted in only £200m in direct consumer loans in 1979, which accounted for less than 3% of total consumer lending that year.

Trustee Savings Banks Act 1985 (Note: Section 7(1).)
- Act of Parliament
- Parliament of the United Kingdom
- Long title: An Act to make provision for the purposes of or in connection with the reorganisation into companies incorporated under the Companies Acts of the institutions regulated by or existing under the Trustee Savings Banks Act 1981 and for the treatment for the purposes of the Banking Act 1979 of any Scottish savings bank established before 28 July 1863 which has not since become a trustee savings bank.
- Citation: 1985 c. 58
- Territorial extent: England and Wales; Scotland; Northern Ireland; Isle of Man; Channel Islands; (Note: Section 7(4)–(5).)

Dates
- Royal assent: 25 July 1985
- Commencement: 25 September 1985 (Note: Section 7(2).)
Other legislation
Amends	Consolidated Fund (Permanent Charges Redemption) Act 1883; Government Annuities Act 1929; National Savings Bank Act 1971
Repeals/revokes	Trustee Savings Banks Act 1981
Amended by	Employment Rights Act 1996; Capital Allowances Act 2001; Statute Law (Repeals) Act 2004; Financial Services Act 2012

Status: Amended

Text of statute as originally enacted

Revised text of statute as amended

Text of the Trustee Savings Banks Act 1985 as in force today (including any amendments) within the United Kingdom, from legislation.gov.uk.

In 1984, the government published a white paper and a new TSB Bill, in which the quasi-federal decentralised structure was abandoned in favour of a single central organisation that no longer had a unique corporate status but was incorporated under the Companies Act 1985. The purported aim was to give the TSB Group plc, as it was called, a more effective operating structure and also to establish clear ground rules on ownership and accountability, neither of which was clear under former legislation. Airdrie Savings Bank refused to join the single entity, and remained the only independent such bank in the UK until it announced its closure in 2017.

In 1984, TSB adopted an advertising slogan by which it is still generally remembered today: "The Bank That Likes To Say Yes".

In 1986, the Central Trustee Savings Bank Limited was renamed TSB England and Wales plc and Trustee Savings Bank plc was renamed TSB Scotland plc.

=== Flotation ===
In 1986, the shares of TSB Group plc were floated on the stock market and the proceeds given to the bank, adding to the ownership equity – a process described by one commentator as "selling people a gold box in such a way that when they opened it they found the purchase price inside". The original holding company, Trustee Savings Banks (Holdings) Limited, continued to be registered at Companies House under that name until 2013.

The newly formed TSB Group's retail banking operations were consolidated into TSB England and Wales, TSB Scotland, TSB Northern Ireland and TSB Channel Islands, each trading as TSB Bank. In 1989, TSB England and Wales officially became TSB Bank, with TSB Bank Scotland and TSB Bank Northern Ireland becoming its subsidiary undertakings. The Northern Irish business was sold to Allied Irish Banks in 1991 (trading as First Trust Bank until 2019) and the Channel Islands business was integrated into TSB Bank in 1992.

=== Merger with Lloyds Bank ===
TSB Group merged with Lloyds Bank in 1995 to form Lloyds TSB. The merger was structured as a reverse takeover by TSB; Lloyds Bank plc was delisted from the London Stock Exchange and TSB Group plc was renamed Lloyds TSB Group plc on 28 December, with former Lloyds Bank shareholders owning a 70% equity interest in the share capital, effected through a scheme of arrangement. The new bank commenced trading in 1999, after the statutory process of integration was completed. On 28 June, TSB Bank plc transferred engagements to Lloyds Bank plc which then changed its name to Lloyds TSB Bank plc; at the same time, TSB Bank Scotland plc absorbed Lloyds' three Scottish branches becoming Lloyds TSB Scotland plc. The combined business formed the largest bank in the UK by market share and the second-largest to Midland Bank (now HSBC) by market capitalisation.

=== Revival of the TSB brand ===
Following its acquisition of HBOS in January 2009, Lloyds TSB Group was renamed Lloyds Banking Group. In 2009, following the UK bank rescue package, HM Government took a 43.4% stake in Lloyds Banking Group, which later announced that, in order to comply with European Union state aid requirements, it would spin off a part of its business under the TSB brand. The new TSB business consists of all Lloyds TSB Scotland branches, all Cheltenham and Gloucester branches, and some Lloyds TSB branches in England and Wales.

After a provisional agreement to sell the Lloyds TSB Scotland business to Co-operative Banking Group fell through in early 2013, Lloyds decided to divest it through a stock market flotation. The new TSB Bank began operations on 9 September 2013, at which time the remainder of Lloyds TSB was renamed to Lloyds Bank.

== See also ==
- Allied Irish Banks (Northern Ireland)
- Permanent TSB (Republic of Ireland)
- Aberdeen Savings Bank
- Airdrie Savings Bank
- Birmingham Municipal Bank
- Edinburgh Savings Bank
- Glasgow Savings Bank
- Liverpool Savings Bank
- London Savings Bank
- Manchester Savings Bank
- Newcastle upon Tyne Savings Bank
- Perth Savings Bank
- Ruthwell Savings Bank
- St Martin's Place Savings Bank
- Sheffield Savings Bank
- Stockport Savings Bank
- West Midland Savings Bank
- York County Savings Bank
- Yorkshire Bank

== Bibliography ==
- Bátiz-Lazo, B. (2004). "Strategic Alliances and Competitive Edge: Insights from Spanish and UK Banking Histories." Business History 46(1): 23-56
- Bátiz-Lazo, B. and Boyns, T. (2003). "Automation and Management Accounting in British Manufacturing and Retail Financial Services, 1945-68." Information Systems and Technology in Organisations and Society, Universitat Pompeu Fabra, Barcelona
- Bátiz-Lazo, B. and Del Angel, G. (2003). "Competitive Collaboration and Market Contestability: Cases in Mexican and UK banking (1945-75)." Accounting, Business and Financial History 13(3): 1-30
- English, L. (1972). A competitive industry's move to expand clientele. The Times. London: 11.
- Horne, H. O. (1947). A History of Savings Banks. London, Oxford University Press.
- Lawton, C. L. (1950). "Trustees Savings Banks in the Twentieth Century." Bankers' Magazine (November): 2.
- Marshall, I. (1985). "Strategic Issues for the Trustees Savings Banks." Long Range Planning 18(4): 39–43.
- Moss, M. and Russell, I. (1994). An Invaluable Treasure: A History of the TSB. London, Weidenfeld and Nicolson.
- Moss, M., et al. (1992). From Ledger Book to Laser Beam: A History of the TSB in Scotland from 1810 to 1990. Edinburgh, TSB Bank Scotland.
- Payne, P. L. (1967). The Savings Bank of Glasgow, 1836–1914. Studies in Scottish Business History. P. L. Payne. London, Cass.
- Pringle, R. (1973). Banking in Britain. London, Charles Knight & Co.
- Revell, J. (1973). The British Financial System. London, Macmillan.
- Ross, D. M. (2002a). Clubs and Consortia: European Banking Groups as Strategic Alliances. European Banks and the American Challenge. S. Battilossi and Y. Cassis. Oxford, Oxford University Press: 135–60.
- Ross, D. M. (2002b). "'Penny banks' in Glasgow, 1850-1914." Financial History Review 9: 21–39.
