= Manchester Savings Bank =

Former savings bank in England

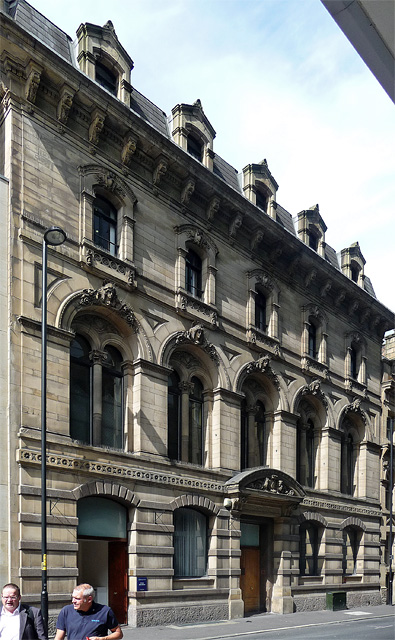
- The former head office at 8-10 Booth Street
- Founded: 1817
- Defunct: 1975
- Fate: Absorbed into Trustee Savings Bank North West Central
- Headquarters: Manchester, England

The Manchester and Salford Savings Bank is a former savings bank which opened in 1818 in Manchester, England. For a long period, it was the third largest savings bank in the country and at one stage, the largest. Following the Trustee Savings Banks Act 1976, the bank merged with seven other local savings banks to form the TSB North West Central.

== History ==
The Manchester and Salford Savings Bank was founded in December 1817 as a result of meetings of "the borough-reeves and constables"; it opened in Marsden Square only a month later, in January 1818. In contrast with many other small savings banks, which were often supported by a local parish and tradesmen, the Manchester and Salford Savings Bank had support from the Bishop of Chester as president, and from members of Parliament, magistrates and "prominent gentlemen" as vice presidents. There were 17 trustees and 59 managers on the board so that the voluntary duties could be spread widely. The trustees also bore the expenses of the bank until it was able to support itself.

By 1830 the bank had proved so popular that it was necessary to relocate to larger premises in Cross Street. Two years later there was a run on the bank following rumours about the general security of savings banks. Some 3,000 of its accounts were closed and the bank had to let out part of its premises to the Law Society. It took some ten years for the bank to recover and begin expanding again, before acquiring larger premises in King Street. By 1856, the Manchester and Salford was the third largest savings bank with nearly £1 million deposits (the two leaders were St. Martin's Place with £1.4 million and the Exeter Savings Bank with just £1 million).

New premises, commissioned to serve as the society's head office, were designed by Edward Salomons in the Renaissance style and opened in Booth Street in 1872.

The bank continued to grow during the second half of the 19th century, helped both by its attention to smaller deposits (having started a penny bank association in Manchester in 1878) and to larger deposits through the formation of a special investment department. However, the Savings Banks Act 1891 caused unexpected problems for banks with such investment departments, as they discovered that they had unwittingly made illegal investments. Attempts to amend the legislation failed; savings banks like Manchester and Glasgow practically suspended these investments and others completely closed them. In 1896, Glasgow responded by transferring its special investment business to an investment trust registered under the Companies Act and Manchester was one of the large savings banks that followed suit. More problems came in 1897, when concern over the falling value of government stock led to a run on the bank. Deposits of £30,000 were withdrawn and the Manchester Bank received support from the Bank of England and the National Debt Commissioners. Deposits began to grow again and by 1910, Manchester still ranked as the third largest savings bank, although this time behind Glasgow and Liverpool.

In 1935, the Trustee Savings Banks Year Book showed Manchester with 134,000 active accounts and £14 million of funds. It continued as the third largest society, ranked behind Glasgow and Edinburgh, a position it still held at the end of World War II. Manchester could, therefore, be regarded then as the largest savings bank in England. In 1973, the Page Committee report recommended that the trustee savings banks should be reorganised into regional banks. Following the Trustee Savings Bank Act 1976, the Manchester and Salford Savings Bank merged with seven other savings banks to form the TSB North West Central.
