= Aberdeen Savings Bank =

Scottish savings bank (1815–1983)

The Aberdeen Savings Bank
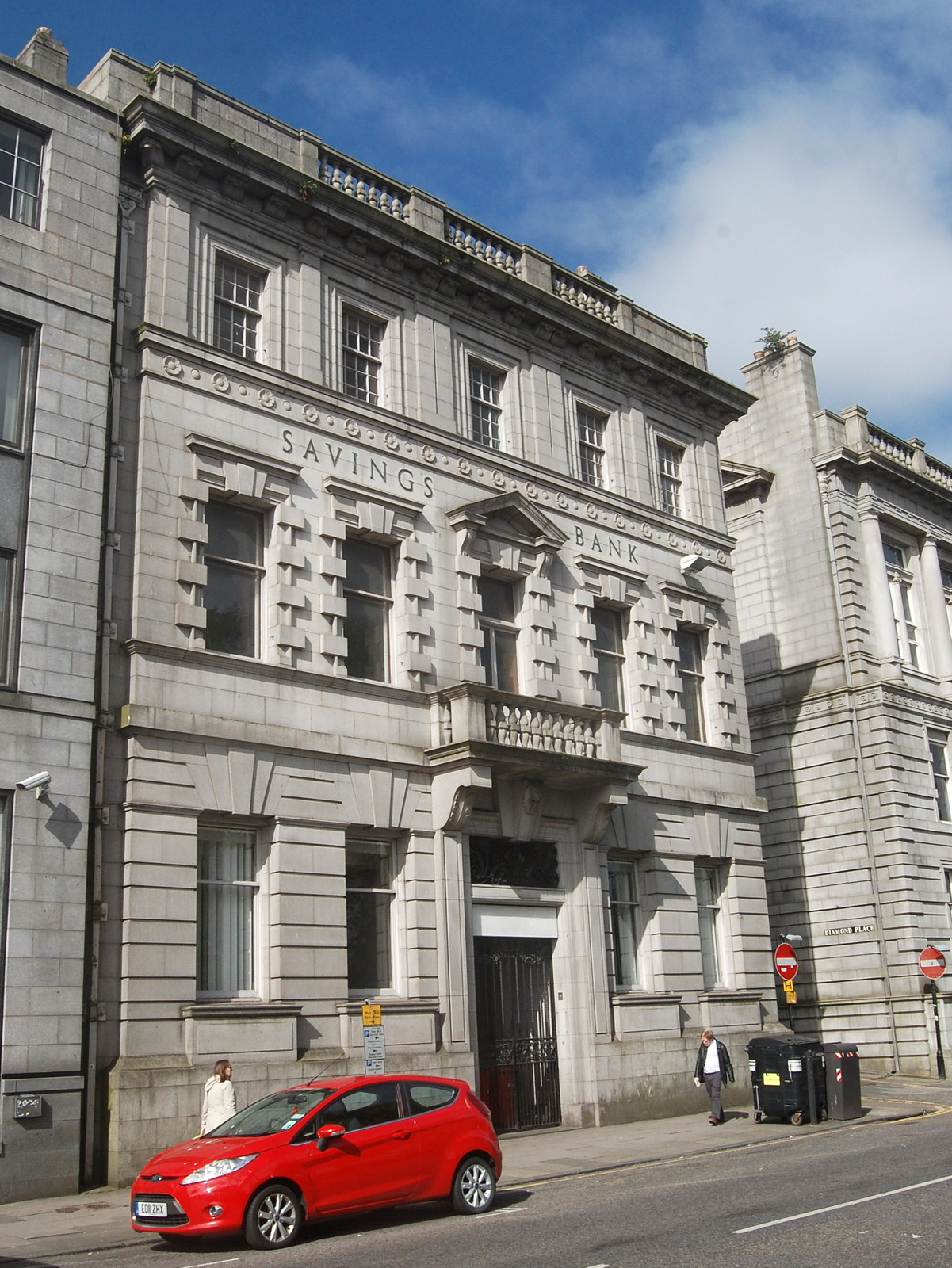
- The company's head office on Union Terrace
- Founded: 1815
- Defunct: 1983
- Fate: Assets transferred to TSB Scotland
- Successor: TSB Scotland
- Headquarters: Aberdeen, Scotland

The Aberdeen Savings Bank was a Scottish savings bank. It was formed in 1815 and reconstituted in 1845 under the Savings Bank Act 1835 (5 & 6 Will. 4. c. 57). It remained a small bank until the interwar period when a series of acquisitions made it grow to fifth in size in 1944. It became one of Scotland's four regional savings banks in 1975. In 1983, it became a part of TSB Scotland.

== History ==
The Aberdeen Savings Bank was established in May 1815, and opened in June of that same year, for the purpose of "receiving such small items as may be saved from the earnings of tradesmen, mechanics, labourers, servants, etc". Amounts ranging from two shillings to five pounds were accepted, and the money was deposited with the Aberdeen Bank. At first, the Savings Bank operated from a room in the Poor's Hospital. It opened for one hour every Saturday morning to receive deposits. The bank was mainly used by servants in its early years. Of the first 100 depositors in 1820, 51 were domestic servants, although this proportion had declined to 14% by 1850.

The Savings Bank Act 1835 (5 & 6 Will. 4. c. 57) gave both new powers and new responsibilities to the Scottish Trustee Savings Banks and many savings banks reconstituted themselves under the new rules. At that time, the Aberdeen had around 4,600 depositors with £50,000 in funds. After much debate, the trustees elected to continue operating under the old rules. Eventually, the trustees decided to operate under the Savings Bank Act 1835, and in 1845 the bank was "reconstructed". It was not explicitly stated, but it appears that a new legal entity was created as a successor to the old bank. However, the reconstruction created one anomaly that took half a century to correct. The old trustees of the bank retained £2,563 of surplus profit and interest, a figure that grew over time. This was held for the benefit of the new bank, but the trustees of the old bank retained control of the funds. In 1857, the surplus was sufficient to finance a new office for the bank, rent-free, but the old trustees retained ownership of the building. Twenty years later, the old trustees even started to charge the bank rent. Eventually, in 1893, a meeting was held between the two sets of trustees to resolve the position. Legal advice determined that the funds were due to the new bank, and this was approved by the court.

For almost the whole of the 19th century, the Aberdeen Savings Bank was a small and old-fashioned entity, illustrated in the later years by customers being kept waiting an hour or two to make their deposits. A review of its operations, particularly the bookkeeping, was held in 1893, at the same time as its relationship with the old bank was being addressed. The following year the annual report stated that "The Trustees of the present Bank are now placed in the position that they should have expected when the old Bank was reconstructed...has become one of the most successful Banks of its kind and size in the whole kingdom". Deposits rose from £493,000 in 1892 to £718,000 in 1896, the last year of the Jaffrey History. A new head office, designed by William Kelly in the Italian Renaissance style was opened at 17–19 Union Terrace in Aberdeen in 1896.

The inter-war period saw the Aberdeen become a more substantial entity. After World War I, pressure mounted for the bank to acquire smaller banks in the area. Recommendations came from the Trustee Savings Banks Association and from smaller banks that could not compete with the higher rates of the larger banks’ investment departments. Aberdeen Savings Bank was the "natural centre" to which smaller banks of the north and north-east gravitated. There were 13 acquisitions between 1926 and 1943. By 1944 the Aberdeen bank ranked fifth in size.

The Page Committee of 1973 recommended that the trustee savings banks should be reorganised into regional banks. This was implemented by the Trustee Savings Banks Act 1975. In Scotland, this resulted in the formation of four regional savings banks. The Aberdeen Savings Bank became one of those. In 1983, the 16 regional TSB banks were merged into four, and the Aberdeen TSB became part of TSB Scotland.

=== Banks acquired by Aberdeen Savings Bank ===
Banks acquired by Aberdeen Savings Bank included:

1926 – Ellon and District Savings Bank

Inverurie and Garioch Savings Bank

Kintore Savings Bank

Stonehaven Savings Bank

1927 – Forres Savings Bank

New Deer Savings Bank

1928 – Thurso Savings Bank

1929 – Insch and Upper Garioch Savings Bank

Wick Savings Bank

1931 – Elgin Savings Bank

1934 – Strathspey Savings Bank

1942 – Nairn Savings Bank

1943 – Savings Bank of Glenmuike (Ballater)

== Kintore Savings Bank ==
A new Parish Minister of Kintore, Rev. Robert Simpson, called a meeting of prominent citizens in February 1837 to consider the establishment of a savings bank. Much preliminary work had been done and the regulations for the bank were approved. The Kintore Savings Bank would open the last Saturday of the month for two hours between 6 p.m. and 8 p.m. and be based in the local school. Most of the original managers were farmers and local Lairds. Deposits were invited from "the industrious working class". The Bank opened in March with 22 depositors; it ended the year with 156 depositors and £1,568 funds. One feature of the original rules was the ambition of the Bank. These rules suggested that the Bank would be willing to associate with any savings bank "desirous of connecting themselves as branch banks with this as a central bank".

By 1840 the Bank was well established and able to appoint an actuary, moving out of the school in 1841, renting an office on Goose Croft. Deposits grew steadily over the 25 years to 1862 to around £8,000 but then began to fall away as its interest rates became uncompetitive. The annual surplus began to diminish and the National Debt Commissioners suggested cutting expenses. The Trustees gave up their office and moved to a shop owned by one of the trustees. By 1896 the Committee had to cut interest rates further to increase the margin. A new chairman decided to open the Bank for seven hours each Monday instead of two hours a month which brought some improvement. However, by 1926 deposits were no more than they had been in 1862. In 1926 the Kintore Savings Bank was merged into the Aberdeen Savings Bank, a stark contrast to its early ambition.

== Inverurie and Garioch Savings Bank ==
The initiative for the formation of the Inverurie and Garioch Savings Bank came not from the church but the Municipality. The Provost organised the initial meeting in February 1837 and was the prime mover behind the Bank. It opened in May 1837 with 11 depositors and by the end of the year, deposits totalled over £3,000. By the early 1900s deposits had reached £27,000 but then began to decline. The Bank was merged into the Aberdeen Savings Bank in 1926.

== Listed building ==
The Aberdeen Savings Bank building at 393 George Street, Aberdeen is a Category B Scottish listed building
