= One Centenary Square =

Office building in Birmingham, England

Coordinates: 52.4787°N 1.9070°W

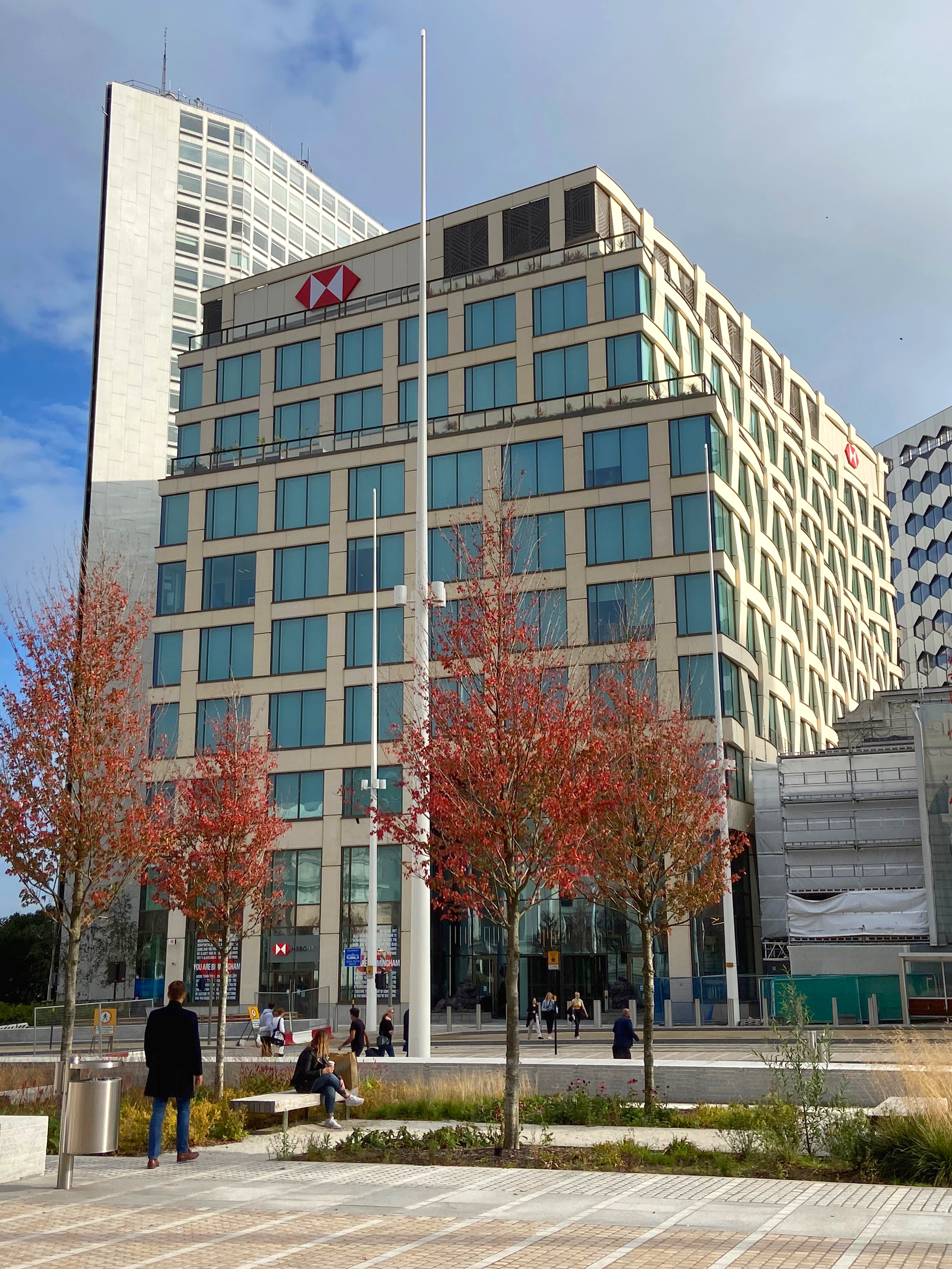
- Interactive map of the One Centenary Square area
- Former names: Two Arena Central

General information
- Type: Grade A Offices, Retail, Restaurant
- Location: Arena Central, Broad Street, Birmingham, England, UK
- Elevation: 142 m (466 ft)
- Current tenants: HSBC UK (2018)
- Construction started: September 2015
- Completed: Autumn 2018

Height
- Height: 55.35 metres (181.6 ft)

Technical details
- Floor count: 11 (OG) 3(UG)
- Floor area: 210,000 square feet (20,000 m^{2})

Design and construction
- Architect: Make Architects
- Developer: Miller Developments; Pro Vinci Asset Management
- Other designers: Progress Planning Consultancy
- Main contractor: Galliford Try

One Centenary Square (formerly Two Arena Central), is a 55 metres (180 ft), eleven storey building between Alpha Tower and the former Birmingham Municipal Bank headquarters on Broad Street in Birmingham, England. The building serves HSBC Bank as their UK headquarters for the personal and business banking operations.

== History of the site ==
The development of the site started when the Birmingham Canal was cut in 1768–72. Its terminal basin, named Old Wharf, was located at the rear of the proposed building. The site was occupied by the Eagle Iron Foundry during the 19th century up until 1926 when it was cleared and replaced by the Masonic Hall. The building formed the southern part of the Civic Centre masterplan with the Municipal Bank built in 1933 to its west. The Freemasons occupied the hall until 1939 when it was acquired by the government during World War II to be used by the Ministry of Food and the War Office for Army Recruitment. The hall was later adapted in the 1970s to form part of the ATV studio complex. The hall was demolished in 2006 ahead of the proposed Arena Central development project.

== Construction ==
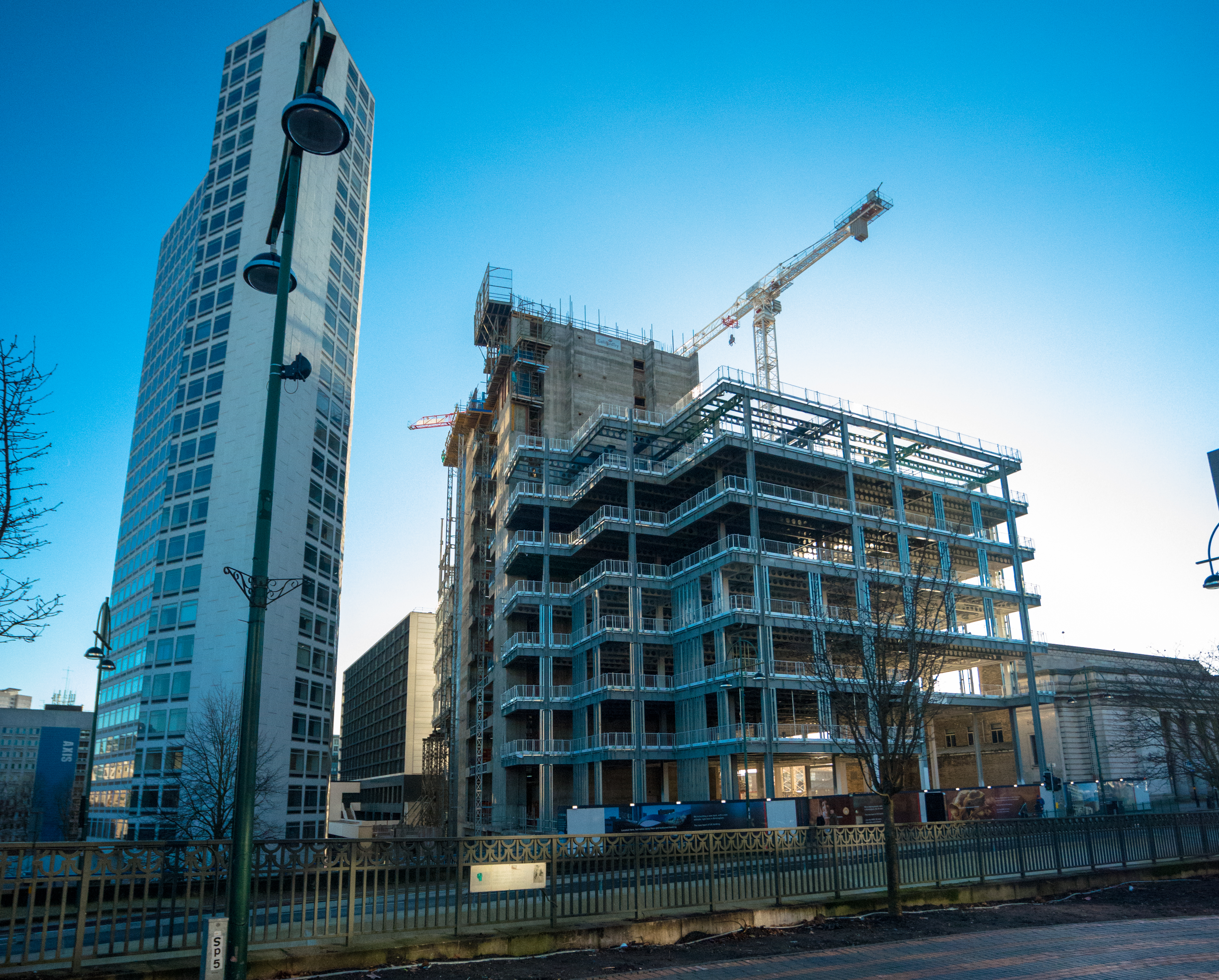
The building under construction in January 2017

In 2015 HSBC Bank completed the deal to forward purchase the building on a 250-year lease which will house UK business and personal banking services with up to 1,000 staff. The deal is the largest property deal in Birmingham since 2002.

On 7 September 2015, representatives from Miller Developments undertook a groundbreaking ceremony to signal the start of the construction phase. Works were complete in autumn 2018.

== See also ==
- HSBC lions
