= London Savings Bank =

Bank in england

The London Savings Bank was a product of a 1916 merger between the London Provident Institution (1816), the Bloomsbury Savings Bank (1817) and the Lambeth Savings Bank (1818). In 1942 the Finsbury and City of London Savings Bank amalgamated with the London Savings Bank. In 1971, the London Savings Bank became part of the London and South Eastern TSB, which in turn became part of TSB South East.

== History ==
The three constituents of the 1916 merger started their life a century previous, and but a few years after the opening of the first commercial savings bank at Ruthwell. The London Provident and the Bloomsbury were both formed as provident societies following the Bath model used by the neighbouring St Martin’s Place Savings Bank. Lambeth, formed in 1818, was constituted as a savings bank following the 1817 Savings Act.

== Three constituent banks ==
=== London Provincial Bank ===
The London Provincial Bank, originally known as the London Provident Institution, was opened in July 1816 with. Sir Thomas Baring as President. The Bank was often referred to as the Bishopsgate Bank, as it was based at Bishopsgate Churchyard until 1832. It then moved to Blomfield Street where it stayed until 1899; its final home until the merger was Middlesex Street, Stepney. The Bank may also have been known as the Moorfields Bank. In 1856, Horne quoted the Bishopsgate Bank as the fourth largest savings bank in Britain, albeit overshadowed by the nearby St Martin’s Place.

=== Bloomsbury Savings Bank ===
The Bloomsbury Provident Bank, later the Bloomsbury Savings Bank, opened in Southampton Row in February 1817, with the Duke of Bedford as President. In 1856 it was the seventh largest savings bank in the country. Bloomsbury was one of the banks active in promoting the formation of a national association in 1887 and was one of 14 savings banks, and the only London representative, on the Council of Management; the Bank also provided the honorary treasurer.

=== Lambeth Trustee Savings Bank ===
The Lambeth Bank had more humble origins than its future partners. Under the chairmanship of the local Rector, a meeting decided to open a committee room in the parish school for two hours twice a week. Directors were to attend to receive money. The parish school master was appointed Secretary, but the increase in deposits made it necessary in 1827 to appoint an accountant. The Bank had to move twice due to railway extensions. In 1849 it moved to Hercules Road where it remained until 1903, when the Bank bought freehold of premises in Kennington Road.

== London Savings Bank ==
Post World War I, a policy of amalgamation was encouraged by the Trustee Savings Bank Association. The London Savings Bank had already acquired the Brighton Savings Bank in 1917 but the latter seceded in 1920. However, the Southampton and the Guildford Savings Banks joined the London Savings Bank in 1919. Gradually, the London TSB extended west to Newbury, south west to Southampton and south east to Rochester. The mergers continued into WWII with the addition in 1941 of the Luton and District Trustee Savings Bank. By then, only two London savings banks remained and in 1942 the London Savings Bank merged with the Finsbury and City of London Savings Bank under the title of London Trustee Savings Bank.

The Finsbury Savings Bank, as it then was, opened in August 1816 in St. John's Square, Clerkenwell Green, Islington. It began in only a small room in a house where “a few people gathered together to form a savings bank for small tradesmen, labourers and servants.” Despite its reputation as a small establishment for poor people, Finsbury had some well-known customers, including Charles Dickens. In 1841, Finsbury moved impressive new premises in Sekforde Street Like the London Bank, in the early twentieth century the Finsbury spread out from London, reaching Bedford, High Wycombe and Gravesend.

The two banks were similar in size. The 1935 Trustee Savings Year Book gave London as number 16 by size with 31,000 active accounts, 13 branches and £4.2 million funds. The Finsbury and City of London Savings Bank was number 21 by size with 20,000 active accounts. 8 branches and £3.0 million funds. At the time of the merger, funds were given as £20 million and in 1944 the enlarged bank ranked number 8 in the country, well behind northern and Scottish savings banks.

In 1951, a new head office was opened for the enlarged bank on the corner of Cannon Street and Queen Street. In 1971, the London Savings Bank merged with the South Eastern Trustees Savings Bank, to form the London and South Eastern Savings Bank. The new bank had 123 offices and funds exceeding £250 million. Following the Trustee Savings Bank Act of 1975 which encouraged further consolidation, the London and South Eastern Savings Bank became part of the TSB of South East.
