= AIB (NI) =

Commercial bank in Northern Ireland

- Type: Division of AIB Group (UK) plc
- Founded: 1991
- Headquarters: Belfast, Northern Ireland
- Key people: Adrian Moynihan, Head of AIB – Northern Ireland
- Products: Various banking products
- Website: aibni.co.uk

AIB (NI) (formerly known as First Trust Bank) is a commercial bank in Northern Ireland that is part of Allied Irish Banks's UK subsidiary AIB Group (UK) plc. It is one of the Big Four banks in Ireland. The bank was created in 1991 when TSB Northern Ireland merged with the AIB Group's other interests. The bank can trace its existence back to 1816 with the founding of the Belfast Savings Bank. The bank was one of the four banks that issued Pound Sterling banknotes in Northern Ireland until February 2019; First Trust notes are no longer legal currency since 30 June 2022. Allied Irish Banks confirmed plans to sell off the bank in April 2010 as part of plans to raise capital, however these plans were subsequently shelved and instead the bank announced investment plans starting in 2014. The bank traded as First Trust Bank in Northern Ireland until November 2019.

== Banking services ==
Allied Irish Banks' UK division, with total assets of €15.1 billion (approx £10 billion), operates in two distinct markets, Northern Ireland and Great Britain (where it operates as Allied Irish Bank (GB)), with different economies and operating environments. AIB Group (UK) p.l.c., registered in the UK and regulated by the Financial Conduct Authority and the Prudential Regulation Authority, operates as the legal entity for the division.

== Banknotes ==
A £100 First Trust Bank note

In common with the other Big Four banks of Northern Ireland, First Trust Bank retained the right to issue its own banknotes, though production ceased on 30 June 2020. These are pound sterling notes backed by their value in Bank of England notes, and should not be confused with banknotes of the former Irish pound.

Earlier note issues by the bank were made under the bank's previous names: the Provincial Bank of Ireland Ltd. (to 1976), Allied Irish Banks Ltd. (1977–1986), and Allied Irish Banks PLC (1987–1993).

First Trust Bank's final issue of notes depicted two generic people, one male, one female. They appear as children on the £1 and £5 notes, as middle-aged on the £10 and £20, and finally as elderly on the £50 and £100. The obverse designs generally feature images associated with the Spanish Armada, commemorating the wrecking of 24 Armada ships off the coast of County Antrim in 1588:

- 10 pound note featuring the ship Girona
- 20 pound note featuring the chimney at Lacada Point, Giant's Causeway, near Dunluce, County Antrim, where the Girona was wrecked.
- 50 pound note featuring a commemorative medal
- 100 pound note featuring the Spanish Armada

A £5 note featuring Dunluce Castle on the obverse and a £1 note also featuring the Girona were issued by the Provincial Bank of Ireland and by AIB, but have not been issued by First Trust Bank.

In February 2019, First Trust Bank ceased issuing its own banknotes in circulation and replaced them with Bank of England banknotes as they are withdrawn from circulation. First Trust Bank notes could continue to be used until 30 June 2022, after which time they ceased to be legal currency but can still be paid into bank accounts, or exchanged for Bank of England notes at branches of AIB (NI).

== See also ==
- Allied Irish Bank (GB)
- Trustee Savings Bank
- Permanent TSB
