= Royal Arcade, Newcastle upon Tyne =

Former shopping mall in Newcastle upon Tyne

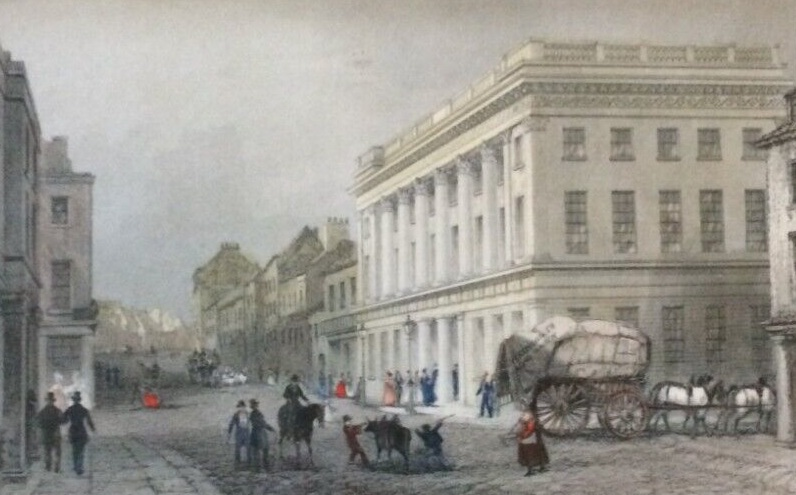
- The Royal Arcade

- Shown in Tyne and Wear
- 54.9715°N 1.6086°W
- Location: Newcastle upon Tyne

History
- Built: 1832
- Demolished: 1963

Site notes
- Architect: John Dobson
- Architectural style: Greek Revival style

The Royal Arcade was a prominent building at the south end of Pilgrim Street in Newcastle upon Tyne, England. It served as a shopping mall until it was demolished in 1963.

== History ==
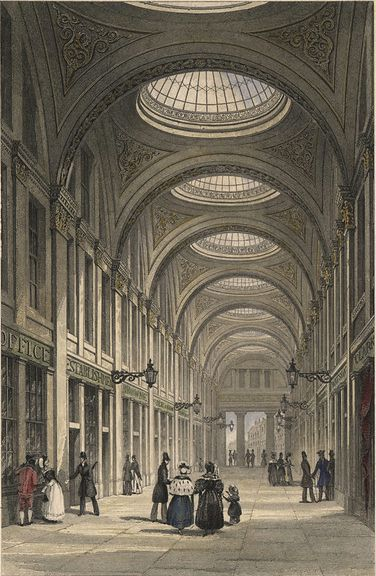
Interior of the building

In the 1820s, a group of local businessmen decided to commission a building which was originally intended to serve as a corn exchange. The site they selected was at the north end of the Tyne Bridge. Work on the building, by then intended to serve as a shopping mall, started in 1830. It was designed by John Dobson in the Greek Revival style, built by Richard Grainger in ashlar stone and was completed in 1832.

The layout consisted of two rectangular blocks, the front block facing Pilgrim Street and the rear block facing Manor Chare, connected by a narrow block containing the arcade itself. The design of the front block involved a symmetrical main frontage of nine bays facing onto Pilgrim Street. On the ground floor, the central section of three bays contained a pair of Doric order columns, supporting an entablature with triglyphs. The other six bays were fenestrated by casement windows. On the first floor, there was an arcade of six Corinthian order columns supporting a frieze, a cornice, a parapet and a balustrade. Internally, the arcade, which was 250 feet (76 m) long, featured a fine vaulted ceiling and a series of huge domed skylights. Tenants who moved in shortly after it opened included the Newcastle upon Tyne Savings Bank, a bankruptcy court and a post office. The publisher John Ross, who published The Songs of the Tyne, also had an office there at that time.

The offices of the savings bank were badly damaged in a fire in 1838. The fire was arson, intended to hide the evidence of the murder of a clerk, Joseph Millie, by the company actuary, Archibald Bolam. Bolam was later tried, convicted and sentenced to be transported to Tasmania.

The venture was not a commercial success: the savings bank left in 1863, the bankruptcy court left in 1872, and the post office moved out in 1874. Referring to Georgian shopping arcades, Sir John Betjeman, writing in December 1960, said "the finest of these are the Royal Arcade at Newcastle upon Tyne, which has been threatened with destruction, and the Corridor at Bath." The building was eventually demolished in 1963 and replaced by a modern tower block, initially known as Swan House and subsequently referred to as 55 Degrees North.
