= Sheffield Savings Bank =

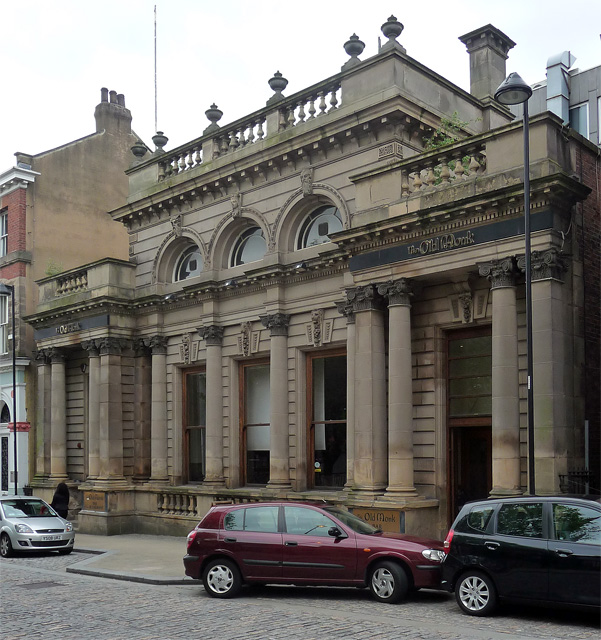
- Head office at 103 Norfolk Street in Sheffield
- Founded: 1818
- Headquarters: Sheffield, England
- Website: sheffieldsavings.com

The Sheffield Savings Bank was formed in Sheffield Yorkshire in 1819. For much of its early years it was run conservatively, briefly experimenting with local branches in the 1850s. In the twentieth century, branches were reintroduced, both in the city and outlying towns. By 1944 it was twelfth nationally by size of funds.

== History ==
=== The first hundred years ===
In November 1818, twenty "philanthropic gentlemen" having seen what was done in other cities, convened a meeting to form Sheffield's own savings bank. The list of twenty included three JPs, five connected with the Cutlers’ Company, a Town Trustee, a banker and sundry manufacturers. Hugh Parker, a magistrate and banker was in the chair and it was duly resolved to establish the Sheffield and Hallamshire Bank for Savings (later shortened). A subscription list was opened for “starting funds “and it raised £175, led by the Duke of Norfolk with 30 guineas. Horne described the Sheffield Savings Bank as “easily the most important of the thirty-nine started in 1819.” Despite the illustrious backing, when the Bank opened in March 1819 it was only in a room lent by the Cutlers’ Company in their hall, with the hours of business confined to two hours on Monday and Tuesday. By 1822 the Bank had deposits of £20,000 and 752 depositors.

James Montgomery, a journalist and poet, was credited with being the “chief begetter” of the Bank. He was one of the original twenty convenors and a modest contributor to the starting funds. When the Bank established a Management Committee in 1824, it was he who was chairman and, became, in effect, the Chairman of the Bank from 1824 to his death in 1854. With the imminent demolition of the Cutlers’ Hall, new accommodation was needed; a new building on Eyre Street was developed. opening in 1832. The Bank then had over 2,600 depositors with total funds of £89,000, compared with 265 and £4,000 at the end of its first year. By 1843, the Bank had some 6,000 depositors but it then faced a setback with the collapse of Parker, Shore & Co the bank that held the funds of the Savings Bank. The initial cost was £2,600 although eventually it was all recovered.

The Bank had an ambivalent attitude to branches. In 1846 it was approached by the people of Rotherham to open a branch but it was turned down. A few years later the Bank opened its first branch in the Sheffield suburb of Pitsmoor. In 1851 seven more branches were established in the suburbs. However, one was closed after three months; three more in 1856 and the remaining four closed in 1857. Montgomery had died in 1854 and a new Actuary was appointed. The new Actuary also liberalised the opening hours at the head office, introducing daily opening, probably appropriate as depositors were now in excess of 12,000 and total funds of £285,000. In 1857 a resolution was passed to erect a new building in Norfolk Street, which was opened in 1860. By the mid-1870s, there were over 25,000 depositors. An approach from Chesterfield residents for a new branch was resisted but an investment department offering better returns was started in 1877. By 1898, funds had reached £1.4m. and the management once again agreed to the re-establishment of branches, albeit on a modest basis. One at Attercliffe opened in 1900; Heeley in 1901; Infirmary Road in 1904 and Burngreave Road in 1911. As well as extra funds from these four branches there were also close ties with local penny banks. In 1918 the Bank had 219 accounts carried out by teachers under the Sheffield Education Committee; these in turn had 40,000 depositors contributing £53,000 of deposits. By the end of its first hundred years, coincidentally coming after the end of the First World War, depositors were 89,000 and total funds £3.4m.

The bank established its new head office in a building designed in the neoclassical style at 103 Norfolk Street in the late 19th century.

=== From Centenary to amalgamation ===
In 1947 Horne placed the Sheffield Savings Bank as twelfth by size nationally. In the first decade after the Second World War a further fifteen new branches were opened. In 1974, the bank completed a major redevelopment and expansion of its headquarters on Norfolk Street, just as the trustee savings bank industry was preparing for its regional consolidation. As a result of the TSB Act of 1976 the Bank merged to form part of TSB Yorkshire & Lincoln, later, in 1986 being floated on the stock market, eventually merging with Lloyds Bank in 1995 to form Lloyds TSB.
