= Newcastle upon Tyne Savings Bank =

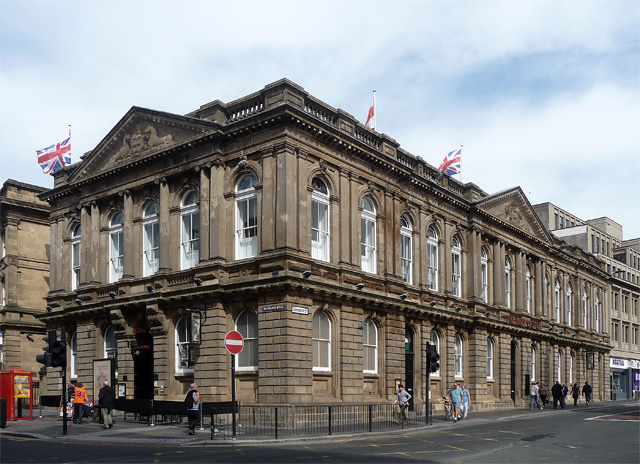
- Head office at the corner of Westgate Road and Grainger Street
- Founded: 1818
- Defunct: 1975
- Fate: Absorbed into Trustee Savings Bank North East
- Successor: Trustee Savings Bank
- Headquarters: Newcastle upon Tyne, England

The Newcastle upon Tyne Savings Bank was a financial institution established in Newcastle upon Tyne in the early 19th century. It merged with several other savings banks to form TSB North East in 1975.

== History ==
The bank was established by civic leaders in Newcastle upon Tyne in 1818. Its early meetings were held in the mayor's chamber in the Guildhall on the Quayside but, in 1832, meetings moved to the former offices of the Tyne Bank in the Royal Arcade close to the north end of the Tyne Bridge. (Note: The Royal Arcade was demolished in 1963.)

The offices were badly damaged in a fire in 1838. The fire was arson, intended to hide the evidence of the murder of a clerk, Joseph Millie, by the company actuary, Archibald Bolam. Bolam was later tried, convicted and sentenced to be transported to Tasmania.

Following a major expansion of the bank's activities in the mid-19th century, the directors decided to establish a more substantial head office. The site they selected was on the corner of Westgate Road and Grainger Street. The new building was designed by John Edward Watson in the renaissance revival style, built in ashlar stone and completed in 1863. (Note: After the closure of the bank, the building on the corner of Westgate Road and Grainger Street was converted for alternative use in the early 21st century: it became an entertainment venue known as the Sports Café Bar and later a public house known as the Mile Castle, commemorating the fact that the site had once been occupied by one of the fortifications, located every mile along Hadrian's Wall, and guarded by Roman centurions.) By 1918, the bank had four head offices (in major towns) and six branch offices (in smaller towns).

The bank amalgamated with the Berwick and Tweedmouth Savings Bank in 1927 and with the South Shields Savings Bank to create the Northumberland and Durham Trustee Savings Bank in 1971. In 1973, the Page Committee report recommended that the trustee savings banks should be reorganised into regional banks. Following the Trustee Savings Bank Act 1976 (c. 4), the Newcastle upon Savings Bank merged with several other savings banks to form TSB North East.
