= Birmingham Municipal Bank headquarters =

Birmingham Municipal Bank
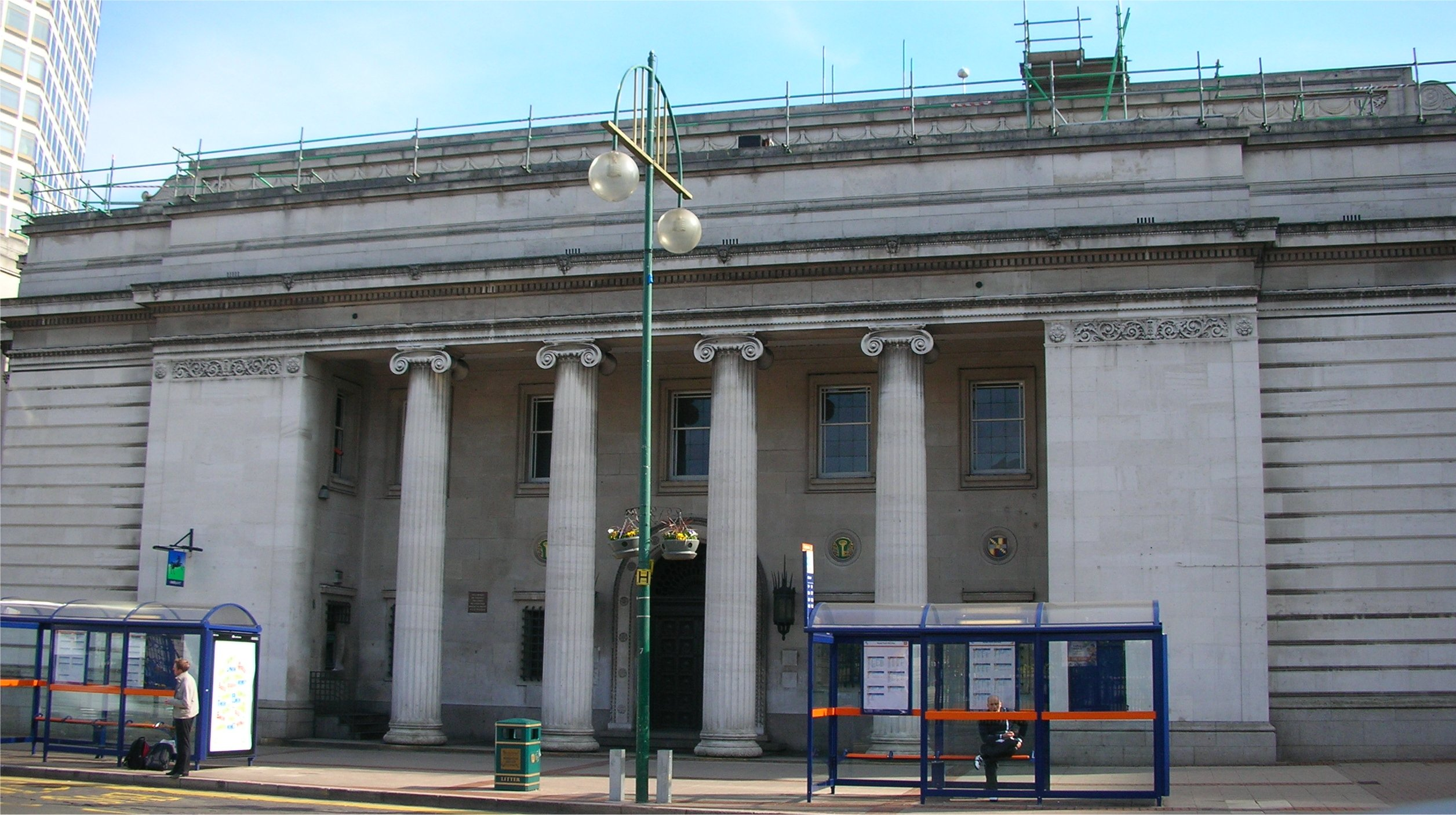
- Interactive map of the Birmingham Municipal Bank area

General information
- Type: Bank
- Architectural style: Neo Classical
- Location: 301 Broad Street, Birmingham, England
- Coordinates: 52°28′42.80″N 1°54′27.34″W
- Elevation: 144m
- Current tenants: University of Birmingham
- Completed: 1933
- Client: Birmingham Municipal Bank
- Owner: Birmingham City Council

Technical details
- Material: Portland stone
- Floor count: 1(OG) 1(UG)

Design and construction
- Architect: Thomas Cecil Howitt

Listed Building – Grade II
- Designated: 14 October 1996
- Reference no.: 1268165

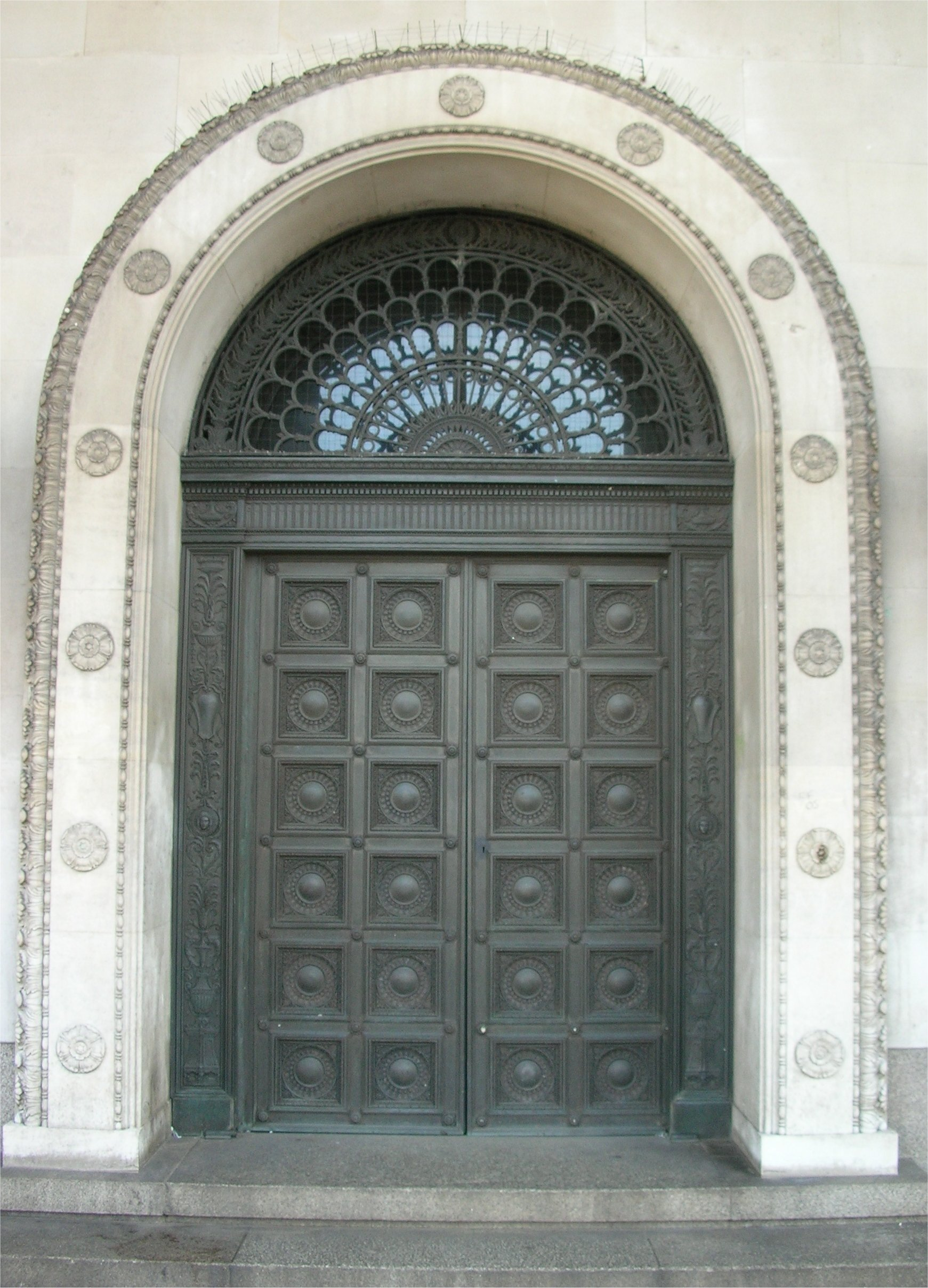
Metal door

The former headquarters of the Birmingham Municipal Bank is a Grade II listed building by Thomas Cecil Howitt opposite what is now Centenary Square at 301 Broad Street, Birmingham, England.

The building was opened on 27 November 1933 by Prince George. The BMB ceased to be a department of the city council in 1976, becoming a trustee savings bank.

After the bank vacated the building, it was sold in 2006 to Birmingham City Council. The building was granted grade II listed status on 14 October 1996.

In November 2017, the University of Birmingham completed the purchase of the Municipal Bank building. It is planned to create a city centre showcase to display its research and host performances and exhibitions.

== Art venue ==
The building has subsequently seen occasional use as an art venue. In March 2007, Birmingham Opera Company produced a new version of Mozart's Don Giovanni, renamed He Had It Coming, in the bank.

=== Thrift Radiates Happiness ===
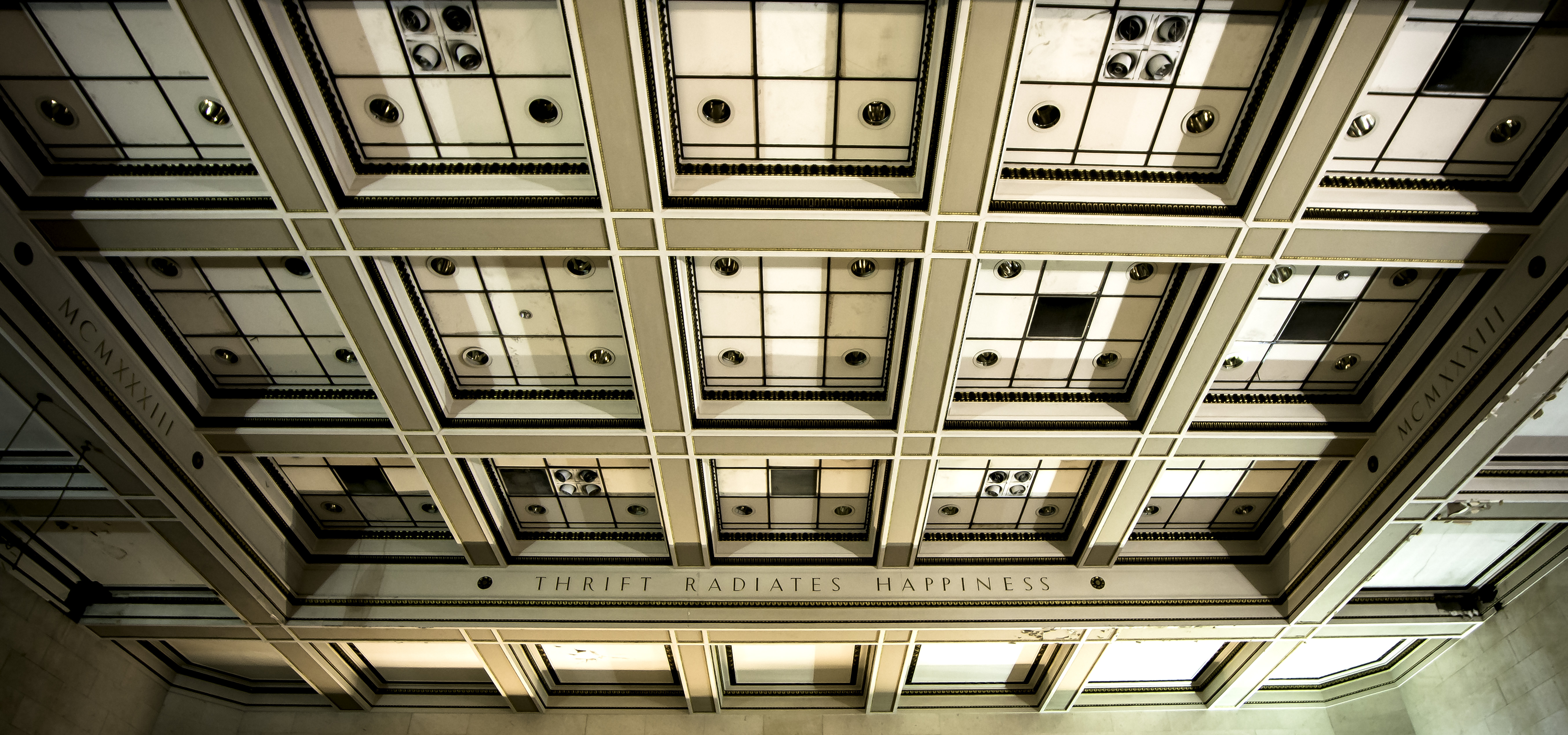
Ceiling Inscription

On 14–17 March 2013 the first contemporary arts exhibition at the building was held, titled 'Thrift Radiates Happiness'. The title of the exhibition was Thrift Radiates Happiness. The line was taken from an inscription found carved across a main beam within the building.

The exhibition included a programme of drawings, images, sound and light, video and sound from local, national and international artists with all the works focused on finance and investment.

The event was an arts and business collaboration between Birmingham-based gallery Trove, Royal Institute of British Architects (RIBA), the Birmingham Architectural Association (BAA), Birmingham City Council and architecture practice Aedas. Entrance to the exhibition was free thanks to funding awarded by The Arts Council, RIBA and Aedas.

=== Universe of Sound ===
The Universe of Sound:The Planets exhibition ran from 25 May until 16 June 2013 with Esa-Pekka Salonen as conductor.

Universe of Sound allowed visitors to take a leap into space in the company of Gustav Holst, Strauss, György Ligeti and Stanley Kubrick, with two concerts, a free digital installation and family activity day.

The exhibition took place over three weeks, showing what it is like to be part of the Philharmonia Orchestra, and provided a chance for people of any ability to have a go at conducting The Planets through an interactive installation.
