= Athelstan Carøe =

English grain merchant and broker

Sir Einar Athelstan Gordon Caroe CBE (6 October 1903 – 18 April 1988) was an English grain merchant and broker with the firm of W.S. Williamson and Co., Liverpool.

== Life and career ==
Carøe was born in Blundellsands, Lancashire, to Johan Frederick Caroe and Eleanor Caroe (nee Gordon). He died in Scorton, Lancashire. He was educated at Eton College (where he was a King's Scholar) and Trinity College, Cambridge.

Carøe was chairman of the Trustee Savings Banks Association, honorary president of the EEC Savings Bank Group and a director of the London Board of the Norwich Union Group. He was Chairman of Minton Ltd. in Stoke-on-Trent until its sale to Royal Doulton in 1968. Caroe was also consul for Denmark (1931–1973) and Iceland (1947–1984) in Liverpool.

He was appointed a Knight Bachelor in the 1972 New Year Honours.

Carøe married twice, first to Frances Mary Lyon on 6 April 1934, and, after her death in 1947, to Doreen Evelyn Jane Sandland in 1952. He had five children: Charles Frederick Caroe (13 May 1935 – 1 August 2012), Andrew Minton Caroe (born 1 June 1937), Clarissa Caroe, John Caroe (who died shortly after birth) and Patrick Nicholas Caroe (1 October 1964 – 10 March 2014).

== Philately ==
In his spare time, Carøe was a noted philatelist who was added to the Roll of Distinguished Philatelists in 1972. He enjoyed tennis and represented Lancashire in mixed doubles with his first wife, his height of 6'5" being an advantage.
