= West Midland Savings Bank =

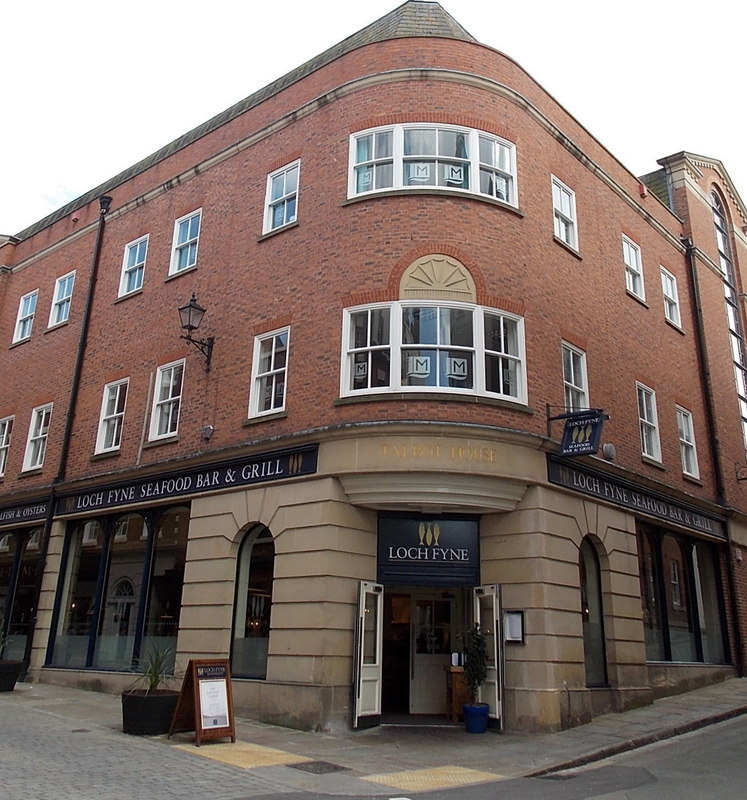
- Talbot House in Shrewsbury (rebuilt after a fire in 1985)
- Founded: 1816
- Defunct: 1975
- Fate: Absorbed into Trustee Savings Bank Wales and Border Counties
- Headquarters: Shrewsbury, England

The West Midland Savings Bank had its roots in Shrewsbury, Shropshire and the merger of its two town banks in 1839 to become the Salop County and Abbey Savings Bank. It remained one of many small savings banks in the Border Counties until the early twentieth century when it led a series of amalgamations. In recognition of its wider coverage, it became the West Midlands TSB in 1937. In 1975 it merged to form the TSB of Wales and Border Counties.

== History ==
There is no record of a public meeting but in 1816 the Salopian Journal announced that the Abbey Parish Savings Bank is now established and will open every Saturday evening between the hours of seven and eight for the reception of deposits at Mr Haycock's office near the Abbey Church. By 1822, deposits had reached £10,000 but there was difficulty in getting assistance and in recruiting honorary managers. 1In 828 Charles Blount was appointed Actuary but he was already a paid official at the rival County Bank. Under his guidance, business at the Abbey Bank gradually declined and in 1839 its funds were transferred to the County Savings Bank under the new name of the Salop County and Abbey Savings Bank.

The County Savings Bank was formed in Shrewsbury two years after the Abbey. Its patronage was on an altogether grander scale. In a public meeting the Earl of Powis was elected president with two other earls and a marquis among the trustees. Charles Blount appointed was appointed in 1823 with a view to improving Bank's efficiency. New offices were rented and then its own building was erected in 1838. A branch bank at Church Stretton was acquired in 1833 followed in 1839 by the Abbey amalgamation. However, after Blount died in 1851, a lengthy period of stagnation followed.

In 1892, a meeting was called to discuss whether the Bank should continue or its funds be transferred to the Post Office Savings Bank. The Bank decided to continue but reserves were low and efforts to cut costs included the closure of the Church Stretton branch. In an attempt to secure increased business, new premises were taken in Market Street in 1906 and opening hours were extended. One of its problems was that, unlike the larger savings banks, the Shrewsbury Bank was unable to offer the additional benefits of a special investment department as its deposits were less than £200,000. In 1913 the Bank resolved "to amalgamate with any bank in Shropshire or Montgomeryshire", a bold step as it had limited means. Negotiations opened with several independent banks in 1914 and agreements were made to amalgamate with the Welshpool, the Bridgnorth and the Ellesmere savings banks. These three had obvious similarities with the Shrewsbury Bank: they were founded at the same time; they suffered a period of long-term decline in the late 1800s, and had insufficient size to offer a Special Investment Department. The Shrewsbury Bank had funds of £146,000 and a similar amount was contributed by the three 1914 acquisitions. This made it possible to apply for a Special Investment Department which became effective in 1915.

The acquisition of the Whitchurch and the Leominster Savings Banks came in 1915, Newcastle-under-Lyme in 1917 (closed in 1922). and Newport in 1918. By 1920 there were over 16,000 depositors and funds exceeded £650,000. With the acquisition of Brecon in 1925 and Oswestry in 1926 the last of the old banks in the area had amalgamated, taking deposits up to £900,000. Future growth had to come from branch expansion and six branches were opened in the 1930s. By 1936 deposits stood at £2.4m. and in recognition of its regional coverage, the broader name of the West Midland Trustee Savings Bank was adopted the following year.

In 1946, helped by wartime inflation, deposits were close to £12m. Growth resumed again and in the decade after the Second World War, a further ten new branches were opened, as far away as Aberystwyth and Gloucester, destined to be the largest branch outside Shrewsbury. At the end of that expansionary period, 1956, deposits had doubled to £24m. Branch expansion was halted for a period of consolidation and the renovation of premises but the improvements in services and monetary inflation took deposits up to £50m. in 1966. In that final year of the Bank's official history there were 23 branches.

The bank established its head office at 11–15 Market Street in Shrewsbury. The building, known as Talbot Chambers, featured a distinctive curved corner frontage and dated from the 18th century. It was rebuilt in a similar style after being badly damaged in a fire in 1985.

Following the Page Report's recommendation on consolidation, the West Midland Savings Bank merged to became part of TSB of Wales and Border Counties.
