= HSBC UK =

UK subsidiary of multinational bank

HSBC UK Bank plc

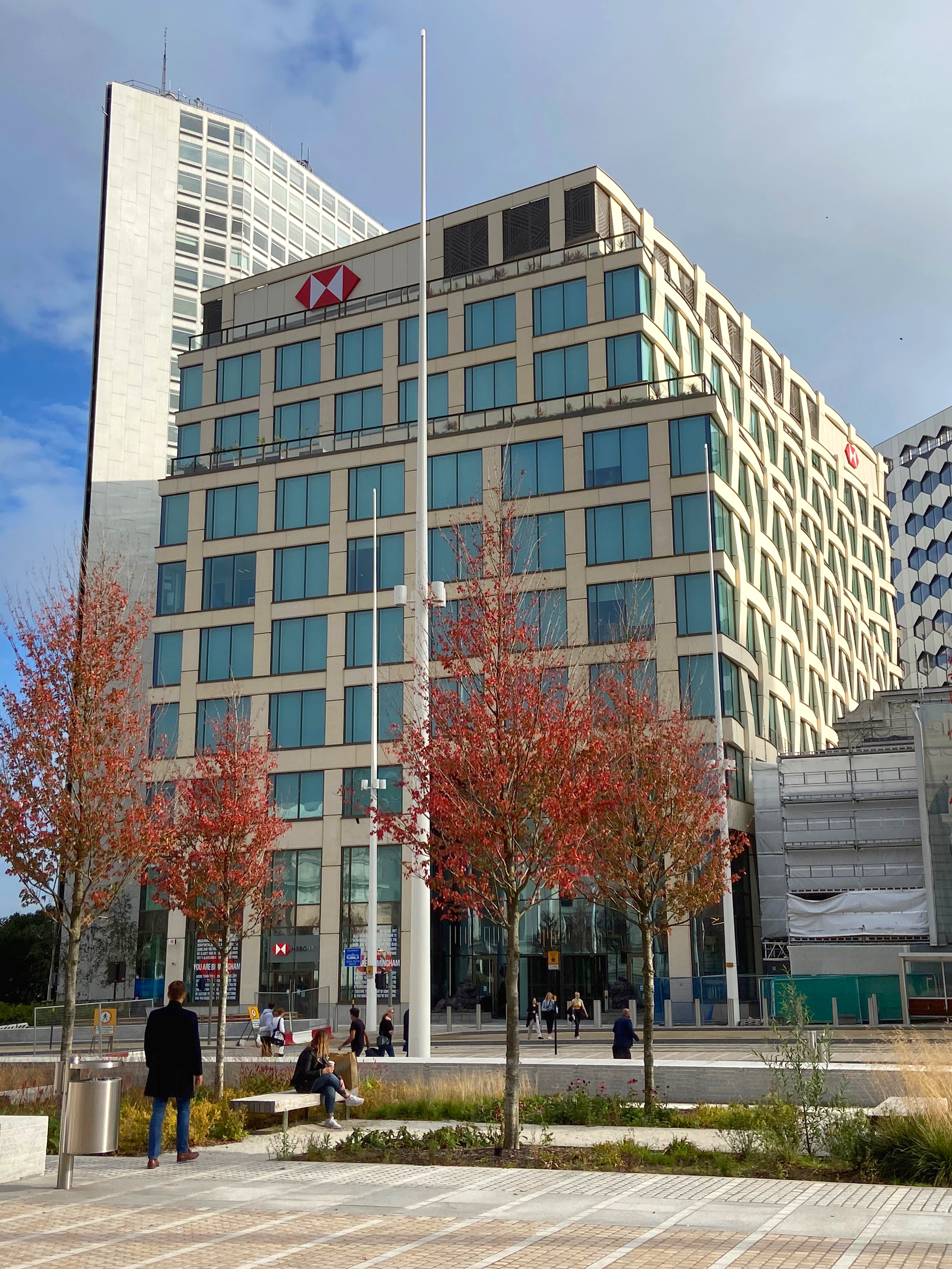
- HSBC UK head office at One Centenary Square, Birmingham
- Formerly: HSBC UK RFB Limited (2015–2017); HSBC UK RFB Plc (8–21 August 2017)
- Type: Subsidiary
- Industry: Finance and insurance
- Predecessor: Midland Bank
- Founded: 22 August 1836; 190 years ago in Birmingham, Great Britain (as the Birmingham and Midland Bank); 1 January 2018; 8 years ago (rebranded as HSBC UK)
- Headquarters: 1 Centenary Square, Birmingham, England, UK
- Key people: Dame Clara Furse (Chairperson); David Lindberg (Chief Executive)
- Products: Financial services
- Number of employees: 85,000 (including its subsidiaries)
- Parent: HSBC Holdings
- Website: hsbc.co.uk

HSBC UK Bank plc is a British multinational banking and financial services organisation based in Birmingham, England. It is a wholly owned subsidiary of the global HSBC banking and financial group, which has been headquartered in London since 1993. The UK headquarters of HSBC is located at One Centenary Square in Birmingham.

HSBC UK Bank plc is one of the four major clearing banks in the United Kingdom. The business ranges from the traditional high street roles of personal finance and commercial banking, to private banking, consumer finance as well as corporate and investment banking. Across all brands the bank operates some 1800 sites in the UK.

HSBC UK Bank plc is the only one of Britain's big five banks to hold more deposits than loans (loan:deposit ratio of 90%). This has led to the bank being seen as a less risky proposition than the other banks by investors and customers, as it is able to fully fund its own operations. This also contributed to the company's share price maintaining value throughout the credit crunch, unlike other banks in the market.

== Acquisition of Midland Bank ==
The Hongkong and Shanghai Banking Corporation acquired a 14.9 per cent equity interest in Midland Bank plc in 1987, and a strong working relationship developed. In 1992, HSBC Holdings plc acquired full ownership of Midland Bank. It was one of the largest acquisitions in banking history, giving HSBC the major foothold in Europe that it needed to complement its existing business in Asia and the Americas. Midland Bank was renamed HSBC Bank plc in 1999 as part of the adoption of the HSBC brand throughout the Group.

== UK banking ==
The bank maintains a network of 327 branches throughout England and Wales, with a much smaller presence in Scotland and Northern Ireland where local banks tend to dominate. In recent years, branches have undergone a programme of rolling refurbishment, with a focus on open-plan areas, increased self-service 'Express Banking' machines, ATMs, and an improved layout. Branches also feature HSBC Live, a radio station specifically produced for the bank by media company Immedia in Newbury, Berkshire.

In mid-2003, HSBC became the first UK high-street lender to offer homebuying products in compliance with Sharia (Islamic) law, which prohibits the charging or payment of interest. The range now includes a bank account, home insurance policy (takaful), and home finance.

In April 2008, HSBC launched a campaign selling mortgages. This was seen as a risky move by media and HSBC staff due to their previous non-plus attitude building on their 3% market share of the mortgage market. While other banks and building societies felt the effects of the 'credit crunch', HSBC, bolstered by a favourable savings to lending ratio, unveiled a mortgage rate matching deal that would offer non-HSBC mortgage customers the ability to match their current mortgage rate.

In 2009, the bank closed its outlets in Morrisons supermarkets which had traded under the Your bank at Morrisons brand following the end of an agreement between the two businesses. The outlets offered a range of financial services, including an exclusive credit card and savings account.

In March 2015, the bank announced its intention to move its UK retail banking headquarters from London to Birmingham (One Centenary Square) in 2018 as part of the programme of ring-fencing overseen by the Prudential Regulation Authority. The programme saw the bank segregate 250 IT systems, change sort code details for approximately 400,000 accounts, and transfer almost 14.5m customers to the new UK arm. The bank also announced it would brand the new arm, including all of its branches, as HSBC UK. It had previously been speculated that HSBC might revive the Midland Bank name or use the first direct brand for its branch network. The new name was rolled out in 2018.

As part of setting up the new bank, a new board and legal structure was created. In November 2016, Clara Furse was named as the first Chairwoman of HSBC UK Bank plc.

== Other UK operations ==
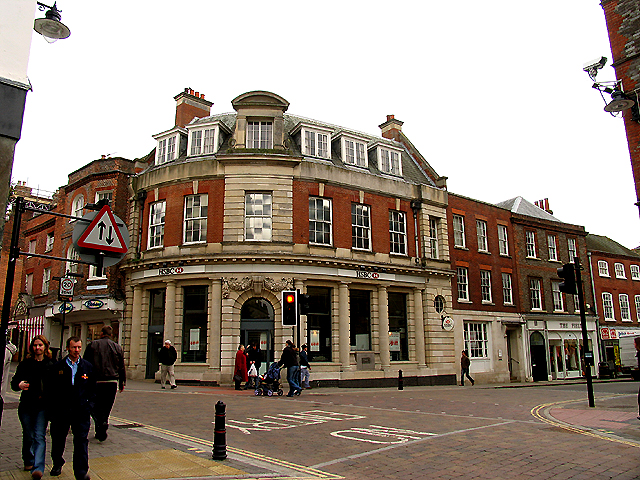
A branch of HSBC in Newbury

=== First Direct ===
In 1989, Midland Bank launched First Direct, the pioneer of telephone banking, with a person-to-person service available 24 hours a day, 365 days a year. It continues to operate as a division of HSBC UK. It now offers internet banking as well and serves more than 1.7 million customers. By 2004, First Direct had established a position as the United Kingdom's most recommended bank. As of 2020, results of surveys commissioned by the Competition and Markets Authority showed it continued to be the most recommended UK bank.

=== HFC Bank ===
Household International established HFC Bank as consumer finance business in the UK in 1973, it became one of the largest consumer finance companies in the UK before Household was acquired by HSBC in 2003. HFC Bank provides retail credit to many leading national retailers and is the largest point of sale loan provider in the UK. The business focuses on retail finance through branches and direct channels, and co-branded and loyalty credit cards. Some of the key brands are the recently relaunched Beneficial Finance (with around 160 branches) and marbles. HFC Bank has around 3.5 million customers.

=== Other brands ===
As a result of the Household acquisition, the UK group gained expertise allowing it to enter joint ventures and contracts with more high street names, such as taking over Marks and Spencer's financial division, now M&S Bank, on a partnership basis in 2004 and the John Lewis Partnership Card contract.

Along with Barclays Bank, HSBC UK Bank plc owns 50% of Vaultex UK Limited, a bulk cash processing company and member of the Bank of England's Note Circulation Scheme, which handles all bulk cash processing for both banks.

On March 13, 2023, after a bidding process, it was announced that HSBC UK had agreed to acquire Silicon Valley Bank's UK subsidiary for £1 in a rescue deal, at no cost to the taxpayer and with depositors fully protected. The subsidiary was renamed HSBC Innovation Bank Limited and trades under the HSBC Innovation Banking brand.

== Controversy ==
=== Withdrawal of graduate overdrafts ===
In July 2007, HSBC suddenly withdrew its interest-free overdrafts for graduates. Students graduating that year discovered that they were to face unexpected bills of up to £140 a year. Students mobilised protests using the social networking website Facebook and in August, HSBC reversed their policy, freezing overdraft charges to recent graduates and pledging to repay charges deducted in August while holding talks with the National Union of Students.

=== Data loss ===
In April 2008, HSBC confirmed the loss of unencrypted data disks containing life insurance policy details for 370,000 customers. In February 2011 HSBC sent a letter dated 11 February to an unknown number of recipients, stating that they were "writing to inform you of the potential compromise of some of your former account information with us." The date and extent of the loss were not given; however, HSBC offered a year's enrolment to ITAC Sentinel and advised vigilance for 12 to 24 months, as well as recommending contacting the three major credit bureaus to place a fraud alert on the credit profile.

=== Cultural insensitivity ===
In 2008, HSBC were accused of 'cultural insensitivity' in an advertising campaign featuring an overweight white man dressed to look like a Sumo wrestler. The campaign upset members of Britain's Japanese community who claimed the man's skin tone was darkened and makeup was applied to narrow his eyes. HSBC denied making the model appear to be from a specific country or region but admitted makeup was applied and skin tone was tanned.

=== Links to arms dealership ===
In December 2008, the British anti-poverty charity War on Want released a report documenting the extent to which HSBC and other UK commercial banks invest in, provide banking services for and make loans to arms companies. The charity writes in its report that HSBC holds shares in the global arms industry totalling £450.6 million, and serves as principal banker for Meggitt, one of the UK's largest arms companies. The report also details HSBC's dealings with known producers of cluster munitions and depleted uranium munitions.

=== Closure of Islamic accounts ===
In 2014, HSBC closed North London Central Mosque's account and some Muslim clients' and groups' accounts. The bank claimed that continuing to provide bank accounts would be outside of their "risk appetite" and said the decisions were "absolutely not based on race or religion" but declined to comment on individual cases.

=== UK money laundering fine ===
In December 2021, the Financial Conduct Authority fined HSBC Bank plc £63.9m for "unacceptable failings" relating to its UK anti-money laundering operations. The FCA said that HSBC's transactional monitoring systems "showed serious weaknesses over a period of eight years from 31 March 2010 to 31 March 2018." HSBC did not dispute the findings, resulting in the fine being reduced from £91m.

== See also ==
- HSBC Expat
- Midland Bank
