= Ruthwell Savings Bank =

1810 savings bank

The Ruthwell Savings Bank
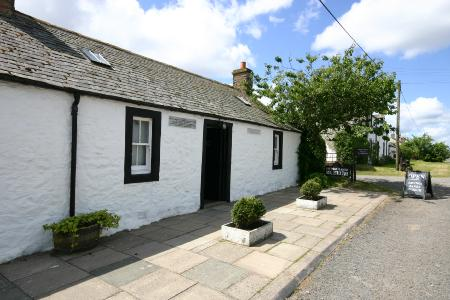
- The company's first branch in Ruthwell
- Founded: 1810
- Defunct: 1875
- Fate: Assets transferred to Annan Savings Bank
- Successor: TSB Bank
- Headquarters: Ruthwell, Scotland
- Key people: The Rev. Henry Duncan

Ruthwell Savings Bank was formed in Ruthwell in 1810, by the Rev. Henry Duncan. Although a pioneer in savings bank history, the Ruthwell achieved limited commercial success and was taken over by the Annan Savings Bank in 1875.

== History ==
=== Formation ===
The Ruthwell Parish Savings Bank was founded in the parish of Ruthwell near Dumfries, Scotland in 1810, and is widely held to be the first bank of its type. Its founder was the Rev. Henry Duncan, regarded as the "father of savings banks". Duncan was born in 1774 near Dumfries and after two years at the University of St Andrews he took a job in 1790 at Arthur Heywood & Co., a Liverpool banking house. Tiring of banking, he decided to follow his father into the church and attended both Edinburgh and Glasgow universities. In 1799 he was appointed minister of the small parish of Ruthwell.

Duncan was deeply concerned about the poor, and extensive writing about their conditions led him to the importance of saving. He revived the local friendly society that had become moribund and founded another specifically for women. Duncan published a series of articles in the Dumfries and Galloway Courier, extolling the virtues of savings banks and proposing that one should be opened in every parish. However, despite the success of the friendly societies, Duncan was not convinced that their rules and regulations, were appropriate. Earlier institutions had been charitable in status. “Dr Duncan had the insight…to see that if the institution was to be of a permanent character it must pay its way.” The Ruthwell was the first savings bank established on commercial principles. In May 1810 Henry Duncan duly opened the Ruthwell Savings Bank in the Friendly Society's rooms.

=== Which was the first savings bank? ===
The claim that the Ruthwell Bank was the first savings bank was heavily challenged at the time, particularly by the Edinburgh Savings Bank which engaged in “One of the wordiest warfares in the history of savings banks”. Although the Ruthwell claim was chronologically correct, the Edinburgh contention was that its model, dating from 1814, was simpler, and that most subsequent savings banks followed the Edinburgh and not the Ruthwell structure. The Ruthwell constitution was, indeed, not one which would have stood the test of time. It was so democratic that its AGM could overrule any management decision; failure to attend the AGM incurred a sixpence fine. Every depositor was required to lodge four shillings a year subject to a penalty of one shilling; there were also restrictions on withdrawals.

=== Failure ===
For all its early start, there is no evidence that the Ruthwell Savings Bank achieved much commercial success. The 1835 Scotland Act followed the English “Rose’s Act” enabling the Scottish savings banks to deposit funds with the British Government which led to a reorganisation of many of the leading banks. However, Ruthwell was one of a handful of Scottish savings banks that did not register under that Act. It was also in 1835 that the Bank's deposits peaked at a very modest £3,326. The Rev. Henry Duncan died in 1846. Subsequently, the establishment of savings banks in Dumfries and Annan reduced the need for a bank at Ruthwell and the number of customers dwindled. In 1875 the remaining 29 accounts, with deposits of just over £590, were transferred to Annan Savings Bank and the Ruthwell Savings Bank was wound up.

== The site today ==
The site is now home to the Henry Duncan Savings Bank Museum.
