= Birmingham Municipal Bank =

Defunct savings bank in Birmingham, England

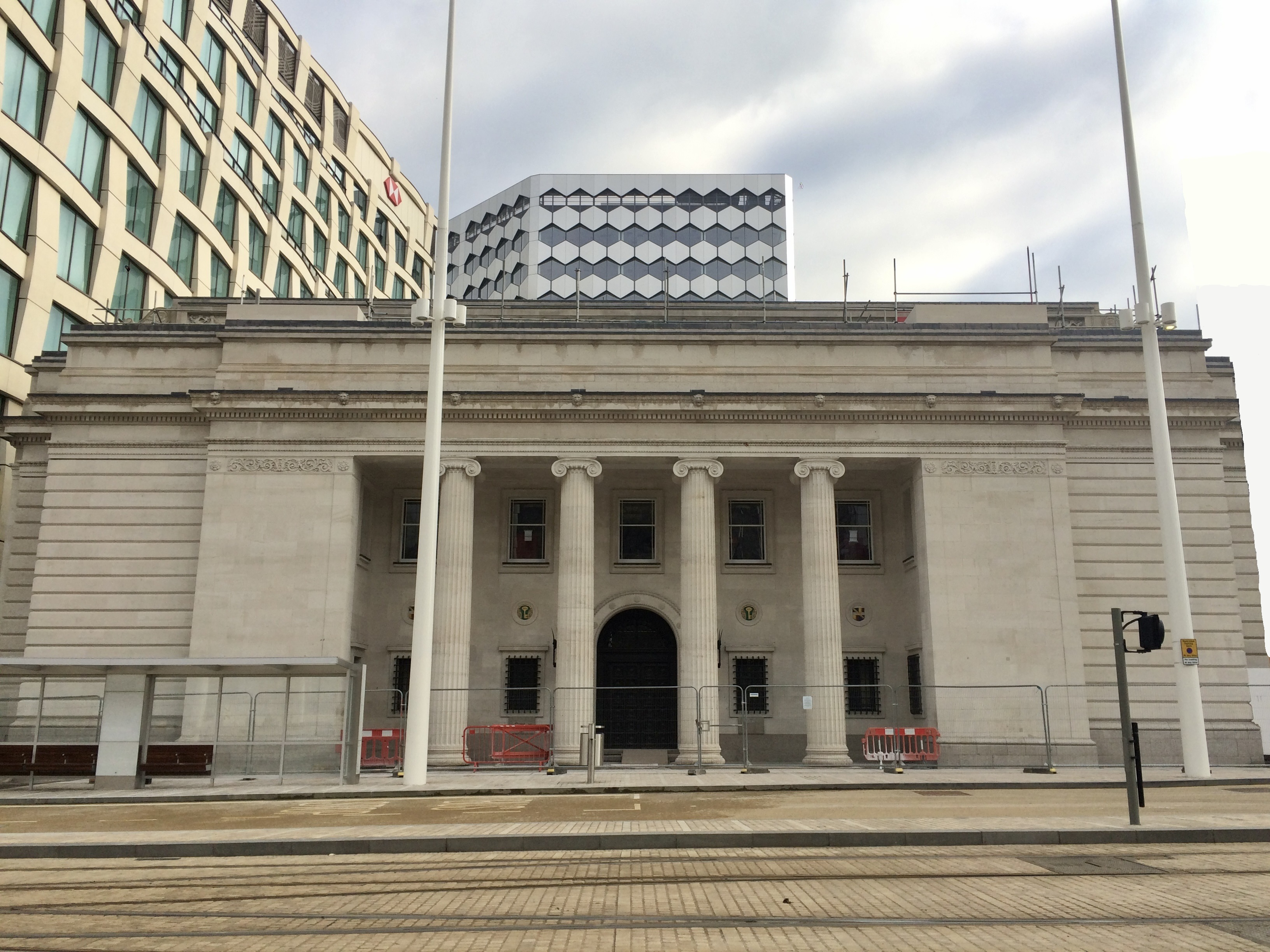
- The bank's headquarters on Broad Street
- Founded: 1916
- Defunct: 1976
- Fate: Absorbed by the Trustee Savings Bank of Birmingham and the Midlands
- Successor: TSB Bank
- Headquarters: Birmingham, England

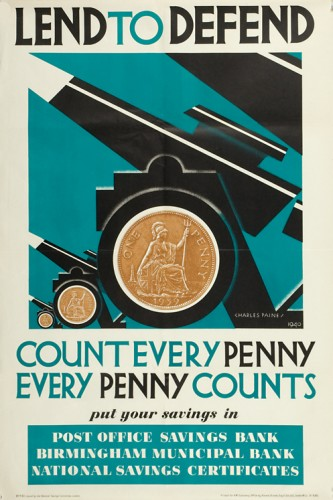
Lend to Defend, 1940 poster designed by Charles Paine

The Birmingham Municipal Bank was a savings bank in the city of Birmingham, England. It was created as the Birmingham Corporation Savings Bank on a temporary basis and replaced by the Birmingham Municipal Bank in 1919. In 1976 it converted into a trustee savings bank.

== History ==
=== Foundation and early years ===
Unlike most major cities, Birmingham had no savings bank before the formation of the Birmingham Municipal Bank (the Birmingham TSB had closed in 1864). The idea for an alternative savings medium came from Neville Chamberlain, then Lord Mayor, who believed that an equivalent savings organisation could be formed by the city council. The concept rested on the deduction of small savings amounts directly from workers' wages. Workers would be given a coupon in lieu, originally for one shilling; these would be stuck to a card and when they totalled £1, they could be taken to the bank and deposited. Trade unions were consulted and supportive. The other founding principal was that the bank must be convenient: “it is a must to set up branch banks in convenient centres".

Municipal Savings Banks (War Loan Investment) Act 1916 (Note: Section 2.)
- Act of Parliament
- Parliament of the United Kingdom
- Long title: An Act to facilitate the Investment of Savings in Securities issued for the purposes of the present War by means of the establishment of Municipal Savings Banks.
- Citation: 6 & 7 Geo. 5. c. 47
- Territorial extent: United Kingdom

Dates
- Royal assent: 23 August 1916
- Commencement: 23 August 1916 (Note: The Acts of Parliament (Commencement) Act 1793.)
- Repealed: 23 May 1950

Other legislation
- Repealed by: Statute Law Revision Act 1950

Status: Repealed

Text of statute as originally enacted

The proposal was approved by the council on the 4 April 1916; only a week later a bill was introduced to the House of Commons. However, it was opposed by the joint stock banks and dropped. After negotiations with the banks, a new bill was introduced in July but it was more restrictive. It could only apply to towns above 250,000 compared with the previous 50,000; there was a £200 savings limit and greater Treasury control. Most important, the bank was to be wound up three months after the end of the First World War. This bill was passed as the Municipal Savings Banks (War Loan Investment) Act 1916 (6 & 7 Geo. 5. c. 47).

Despite these limitations, Birmingham still went ahead and the Birmingham Corporation Savings Bank opened on 29 September 1916.

The old bank ceased to take deposits at the end of October 1919 and was wound up in November, the business to be continued in the new bank – the Birmingham Municipal Bank, established under the Birmingham Corporation Act 1919 (9 & 10 Geo. 5. c. lxv). The new bank had opened in September with a head office and 17 branches. The branches were often a room in a house or shop, and often only part time (13 out of 20 in 1920) but permanent premises were found once the business became established. Almost immediately, a housing department was established, giving the bank characteristics of a building society. Applicants had to be depositors and the property be in the city. Initially loans were limited to 50% of the price and a limit of £800 valuation. In 1921 increased to a more conventional 80% and £1,000. Perhaps the most radical of the council’s policies was the decision in 1923 to allow tenants to buy their own houses, with the mortgage provided by the bank; the proceeds were to be used to build new houses. By 1927, the end of Hilton’s book, deposits had reached £7.8 million and there were 32 branches.

The success of the Birmingham Municipal Bank, which was to become the second largest local savings bank in Britain, led to campaigns by other authorities, especially in Labour areas, to form their own municipal banks. However, the Treasury was not supportive and attempts to introduce bills failed. The Bradbury Committee Report of 1928 commended Birmingham but did not recommend others following. Powers were occasionally granted as with Cardiff and Birkenhead but because of the restrictions imposed, they were abandoned.

=== Steady growth ===
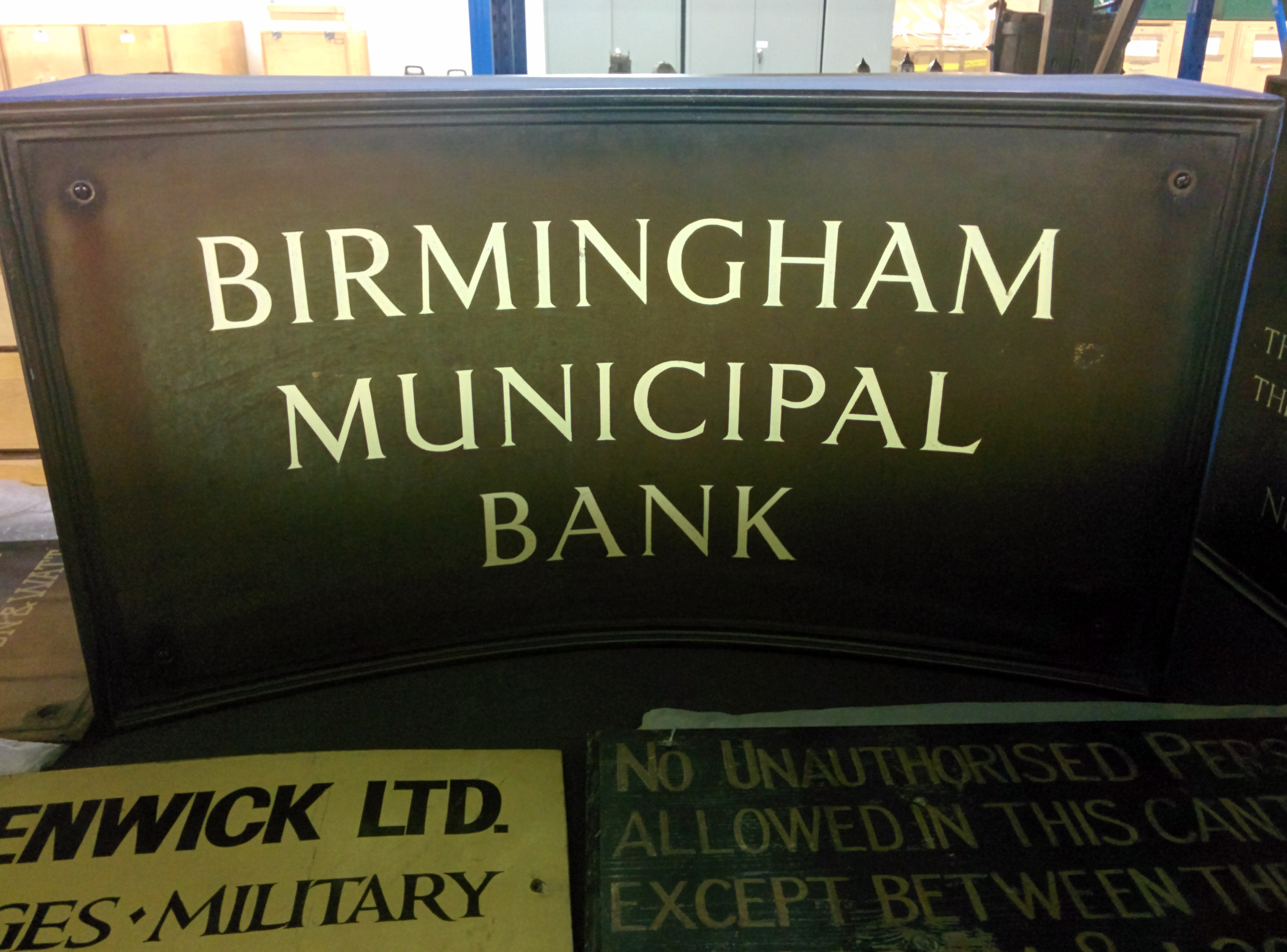
Birmingham Municipal Bank sign at Birmingham Museum Collection Centre

By the end of its first decade, the structure and operation of the bank had been firmly established and the 1930s were a period of steady expansion in branches. By 1930 there were 51 branches, of which 12 were part time; by the onset of the Second World War the number had increased to 63, with only three being part time. The growth in business necessitated a larger head office and a new building was opened in Broad Street in 1933. The Birmingham Corporation (General Powers) Act 1929 (20 & 21 Geo. 5. c. xxxviii) gave the bank authority to negotiate with adjoining local authorities in order to open branches outside the city and this could often prove contentious – as with Sutton Coldfield in 1935, where the Sutton Coldfield council were concerned it was a first step towards annexation of their borough by Birmingham. The first branch outside the city boundaries was in Oldbury in 1931 and as well as Sutton Coldfield in 1936, branches in Halesowen and Rubery were proposed after agreement with the relevant local authority.

Geographical growth after the War was modest. There were 72 branches in 1970 compared with 68 in 1950. What did help was a relaxation in some of the restrictions imposed on the bank: the limit on deposit size was raised to £2,000 in 1946 and to £3,000 in 1952. New types of accounts were introduced in 1957 to attract depositors and respond to the challenge from the building societies. A wider range of functions was introduced from the 1960s, for instance the provision of foreign exchange in 1965. In 1967, the bank took its first step away from its roots as a savings and housing bank with the introduction of a cheque account facility.

The 1970s saw increasing co-operation with the traditional trustee savings banks which was eventually to end the Birmingham Municipal Bank's existence as an independent entity. The association was first driven by the introduction of computerisation. In 1972, the bank joined the West Midlands and South Wales Computer Consortium of the Trustee Savings Banks. Six TSBs were already members of this consortium, and the addition of the Birmingham increased the number of branches to be linked to a new computer centre from 107 to 178. However, an even closer relationship was precipitated by the Page Committee to Review National Savings.

=== Conversion to trustee savings bank ===
The report of the Page Committee was published in June 1973, and amongst its recommendations were greater powers for the TSBs and amalgamations of the smaller units. With specific reference to the BMB, the review stated that the bank was closely comparable with a trustee savings bank and that the bank should align any new arrangements proposed for trustee savings banks to its own operations. For the next three years, the BMB negotiated with the Treasury regarding the transfer of its status to that of a trustee savings bank. Had the council not taken this route, the bank might not have been able to enjoy the extended powers being offered to the TSBs and would therefore have been less competitive. An assurance of particular value was that the trustees could still be appointed by the city council while the bank remained independent. The Birmingham Municipal Bank closed its doors on 31 March 1976 and on the following day the Birmingham Municipal Trustee Savings Bank opened. Three years later, the Birmingham amalgamated with the TSB of the Midlands to become part of the TSB of Birmingham and the Midlands.

=== Bank headquarters after the closure ===
In 2021, the University of Birmingham opened a central-city meeting and conference site called The Exchange in the former bank headquarters in Centenary Square.
