= Liverpool Savings Bank =

The Liverpool Savings Bank
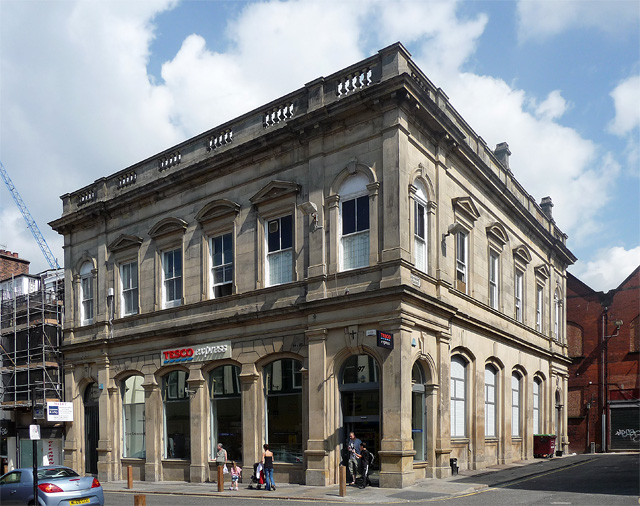
- The company's head office in Bold Street, Liverpool
- Founded: 1815
- Defunct: 1975
- Fate: Absorbed by the Trustee Savings Bank of Mid-Lancashire & Merseyside
- Successor: TSB Bank
- Headquarters: Liverpool, England
- Key people: Archdeacon Jonathan Brooks

The Liverpool Savings Bank was a bank founded in 1815 in Liverpool, United Kingdom. By 1956, it had grown to be the fourth largest savings bank in the country. The bank became part of the TSB of Mid-Lancashire & Merseyside.

== History ==
The Liverpool Savings Bank emerged from earlier philanthropic endeavours. In 1809, the Liverpool Society for Bettering the Condition of the Poor was formed and started by promoting a friendly society and public kitchens. A committee was formed in November 1811 to draw up rules for a “Mechanics, Servants’ and Labourers’ Fund” which duly launched as a savings bank of sorts. After several public meetings in 1814, there was an agreement to establish the Liverpool Savings Bank, the trustees being “prominent gentlemen who were active in philanthropic pursuits across Liverpool”. The premises selected for the bank to operate in were on Ranelagh Street and it opened for business at the start of 1815. The bank operated under the” benevolent despotism” of Archdeacon Jonathan Brooks and links were maintained with the founding charity until Brooks’ death in 1855.

The bank, in its early days, made it hard for the customers to make withdrawals. Customers could only withdraw money on two designated days a month.Brooks insisted on overseeing all withdrawals and approving them. Sometimes he would provide advice as to why the customer should not withdraw the money.

Helped by the opening of agencies at Huyton and Winwick in 1818, the bank had approaching 1,000 depositors and moved to larger premises in Freemason's Hall in 1819. Despite its growing size, the bank operated under very conservative constraints. Even through the 1820s, the bank was only open for withdrawals for two days each month. This reflected the wishes of Archdeacon Brooks, who insisted on paying out all the money himself, supposedly due to his desire to make personal enquiries of the depositor, and to provide them with 'sound moral advice.' Despite this conservative approach, in 1829 the bank had over 6,000 depositors and deposits totalling over £275,000. By the 1850s, the bank was open for four days a week and with £750,000 fund; by 1856 it had become the fourth largest saving bank in the country. To accommodate its increased size, the bank built a new headquarters in Bold Street in 1861.

The bank's first branch was opened at the Kirkdale suburb in September 1858. More branches were to follow throughout the close of the nineteenth and into the twentieth centuries. According to Cargill, by 1910, the Liverpool Savings Bank counted as the second largest savings bank, well behind Glasgow but just ahead of Manchester, with £3.5 million funds deposited with the National Debt Commissioners. The expansion of its branch network continued until the outbreak of the First World War and by the end of the War, the bank had secured another 25,000 accounts. The inter-war years saw the bank expand outside Liverpool into a regional bank, represented across the north-west. The TSB Year Book recorded Liverpool Savings Bank as the country's fifth largest saving bank with 118,000 active accounts and £9.3 million of funds; by the end of the Second World War, it was the seventh largest. The bank continued as an independent organisation until 1976 when, following the 1975 TSB Act, the bank became part of the Trustee Savings Bank of Mid-Lancashire & Merseyside, one of the new regional TSBs.
