= Stockport Savings Bank =

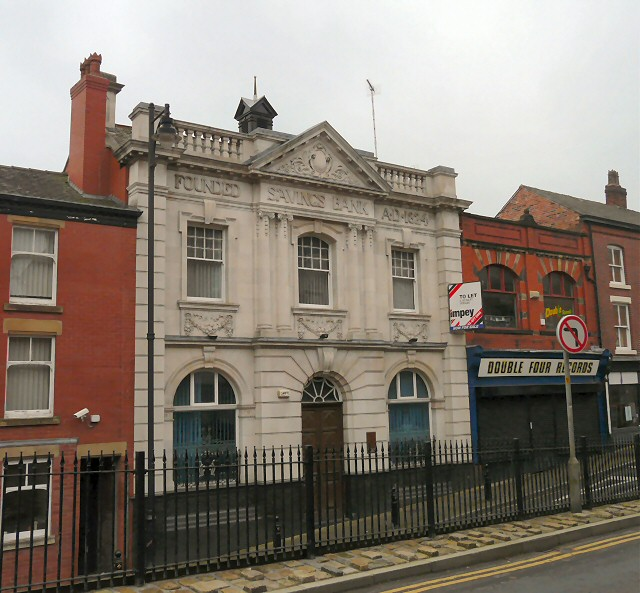
- The Grade II listed Stockport Savings Bank building of 1913 on Lower Hillgate in Stockport
- Industry: Financial Services
- Founded: 1824
- Headquarters: Stockport, United Kingdom
- Products: Retail banking

Stockport Savings Bank LLC was a retail bank that was established in 1824 in Stockport.

== History ==
=== The first hundred years ===
The Stockport Savings Bank was formed in 1824, a few years after the rush of savings bank formations that followed the opening of the Ruthwell Savings Bank, allegedly due to fear of the promoters' motives. Eventually, "a body of public-spirited gentlemen of local influence and distinction" petitioned the mayor for a public meeting and this was convened in July 1824 at Underbank Hall. The declared object of the bank was "to furnish mechanics, labourers, servants and others, residing in this town and neighbourhood with the opportunity of depositing with security and advantage any small sum they may be able to save out of their earnings". The bank duly opened a month later operating out of room in Underbank Hall. At the first meeting £222 was deposited by 47 people.

The bank operated a modest scale for many years. It only opened for three hours on Monday mornings, adding an extra two hours on Fridays for "country depositors" in 1830. In 1831 the Bank moved to Turner's Buildings where it occupied "a small badly ventilated room" in a shop, for the next 12 years. At the end of its first decade, the bank had 1,149 depositors and £32,000 funds. There appeared to be some dissatisfaction with the progress of the bank and in 1840 a Special Investigations Committee recommended "a more efficient system of management" following which a new actuary was appointed. One area where the bank had achieved some success was with friendly societies. In much the same way as other savings banks cultivated the penny banks, Stockport held accounts for 58 friendly societies allowing them to deposit the small funds collected from their members.

In 1843 the bank bought a house and outbuildings at Lower Hillgate. These were demolished and a new building erected and then periodically extended as the bank grew. In 1913 a new building was again constructed on the site. Despite this, the bank continued to act conservatively and it was not until 1870 that it opened every day to customers but, even then, it only opened on three days for withdrawals. There was a brief experiment with branches: one was opened at Altrincham in 1878 but it was closed three years later. The 1924 history made no further mention of branches. A tentative attempt to cultivate penny banks was made in 1879 when three of them were allowed to open accounts at the bank. The bank became more proactive in the early years of the 20th century. In 1905, when deposits exceeded £450,000, penny banks were established in conjunction with elementary schools. The following year the bank opened a Special Investment Department which permitted better terms for larger investors. These had first been opened by other savings banks in the 1870s but legislation caused them to be halted in the 1890s. The Stockport Bank's decision came after the 1904 Act had regularised their operation. The investment department funds grew to £204,000 by 1924 out of total deposits of £960,000.
