= Trustee Savings Banks Association =

The Trustee Savings Banks Association was a British association that aimed to work on behalf of the trustee savings banks (TSBs) in the United Kingdom. It was established in Manchester in 1887. However, throughout its history the Trustee Savings Banks Association failed to act as central provider of administrative functions to small independent savings banks.

== History ==
Initially only 26 of the 389 trustee savings banks (TSBs) became members. The work of the association was to be directed by a Council of Management comprising representatives from not fewer than fourteen of the larger TSBs. The day-to-day affairs were to be guided by a trio of honorary secretaries made up of the actuaries of the Glasgow, Manchester and Liverpool savings banks. But for a long time it remained ineffective in persuading hundreds of small savings banks to speak and act as a single body. Spencer (later Sir Spencer) Portal was credited with introducing the idea of appointing a permanent secretary and a large council in 1914 with the aim of deciding a common policy as well as a single voice to conduct negotiations with the government and promote legislation. Spencer Portal became deputy chairman of the Association in 1919, chairman in 1923 and president when relinquishing his chair in 1935.

By the 1930s the association under Spencer Portal was already successful in putting forward a common view to parliamentary committees and the Treasury to support the progress of the savings banks. This was important given the detailed regulatory framework surrounding the operation of the savings banks. Notable achievements included lifting limits on deposits introduced in 1915 as well as major reforms such as those of around the Act of Parliament of 1929, 1965 and 1975. As of 1970, 75 TSBs had joined the association.

In 1975, Freddie Miller, the then president secretary-general, became deputy chief executive of the newly created TSB Central Board, working under Tom Bryans.
