= Edinburgh Savings Bank =

Scottish bank

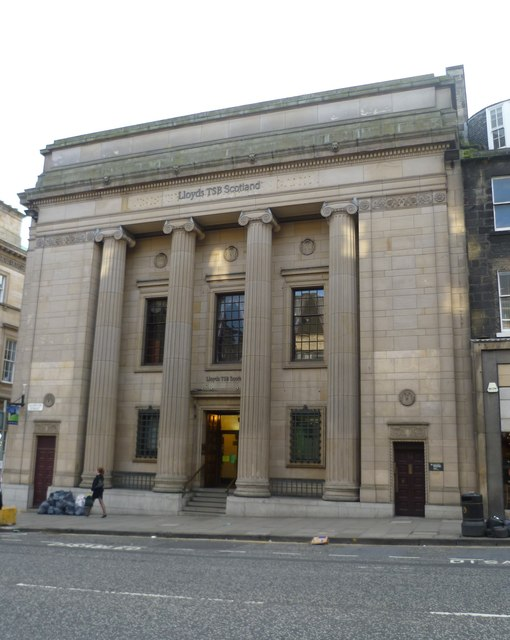
- The former head office at 28–30 Hanover Street in Edinburgh
- Founded: 1836
- Defunct: 1975
- Fate: Absorbed into South of Scotland Trustee Savings Bank
- Headquarters: Edinburgh, Scotland

Formed in 1836, the Edinburgh Savings Bank was successor to the Edinburgh Bank for Savings, which dated back to 1814. Although formed after the Ruthwell Savings Bank, the Edinburgh provided the model for future savings banks. By the end of World War two, it was second in size only to the Glasgow Savings Bank. In 1975, Edinburgh merged with three other Scottish savings banks to form an enlarged South of Scotland TSB.

== History ==
The Edinburgh Savings Bank was, in essence, a continuation of The Edinburgh Bank for Savings; that grew out of the Edinburgh Society for the Suppression of Beggars, and it opened its doors in January 1814. The chief promoter was JH Forbes, son of banker Sir William Forbes of Pitsligo. The Bank's early history was notable for “One of the wordiest warfares in the history of savings banks”. This revolved around the claims made by Forbes and the Reverend Henry Duncan, founder of the Ruthwell Savings Bank, as to which of the two was the first savings bank. The Ruthwell claim was clearly chronologically correct but Forbes contention was that the Edinburgh model was superior. Ruthwell allowed depositors to share in the management; it made “enquiries into the morals of its depositors”, imposed restrictions on withdrawals and fined irregular savers. Edinburgh did none of these and tried to make the bank as alike to an ordinary bank as possible. The simpler Edinburgh model prevailed as a model for other savings banks.

The Edinburgh Bank for Savings quickly opened four branches in the city but, according to the official history, it appears to have dwindled away to vanishing point by 1835, “not helped by its unyielding attitude” of some trustees to the new legislation, A fresh start was decided and (presumably dissenting trustees) decided to start a new institution. In December 1836 it was resolved to establish the Edinburgh Savings Bank, to operate under the 1835 legislation. There seemed to be little capital behind the new bank. It opened in a flat in a house at 87 Princes Street and staff salaries were paid by the trustees personally until 1840 when the Bank had accumulated sufficient funds to pay wages itself. The Bank was then able to open new premises at the Mound and in 1846 there was a proposal for its first branch, though nothing materialised.

Banking crises were not unknown but the one in 1857 demonstrated the local confidence in the Bank. The Western Bank of Scotland, the second largest bank in Scotland, collapsed with the loss of all shareholder's capital while the City of Glasgow Bank suspended payments for one month. The Edinburgh Bank brought large amounts of cash from London as protection but only 275 out of 26,000 depositors withdrew their funds. In contrast, the Bank's solid reputation attracted a large number of new accounts. The Bank's funds totalled £407,000, all invested with Government. By now, the Edinburgh ranked ninth largest of the savings banks.

Once again, the introduction of branches was considered in 1857 but fire destroyed the head office and surplus funds were needed for rebuilding. Eventually, the first branch was opened in 1870 in Leith, total deposits then having risen to £747,000. The next thirty years saw steady progress: a further five branches were opened and by 1900 deposits had risen to £3.2m. At the beginning of the C20th, the directors stressed the necessity to add further branches “in fairly rapid succession”. It was far from rapid but by 1932 the number of branches had reached 15, and remained at that number when the Bank's official history ended, celebrating its centenary.

In 1939, the bank established a new head office, designed by Oldrieve, Bell and Paterson, at 28–30 Hanover Street. By 1944, the Scottish TSBs had almost one third of the UK's TSB funds. Glasgow was the largest savings bank in the country and Edinburgh, though half Glasgow's size, was second.

The Page Committee report of 1973 recommended substantial consolidation of the trustee savings banks. Edinburgh absorbed the Border Counties TSB in 1974. Following the 1975 Trustee Savings Banks Act, four regional savings banks were formed in Scotland. Edinburgh merged with the South of Scotland; Border Counties; and Dunfermline to form an enlarged South of Scotland TSB.
