= Glasgow Savings Bank =

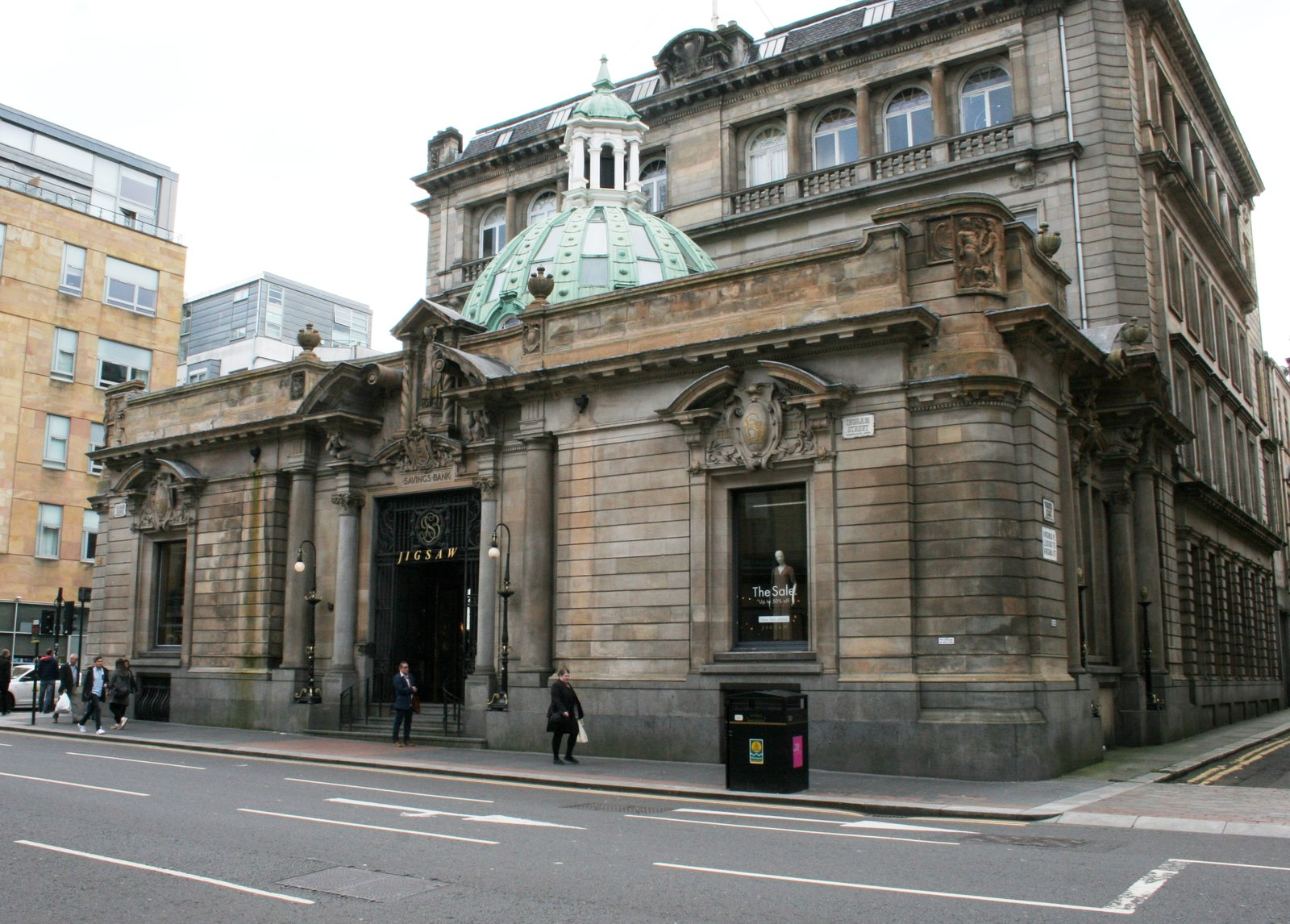
- Former head office in Ingram Street
- Company type: Cooperative
- Industry: Financial services
- Founded: 1836
- Defunct: 1974
- Fate: Merged
- Successor: Trustee Savings Bank
- Headquarters: Glasgow, United Kingdom
- Area served: Glasgow and surrounding area
- Products: Savings accounts, mortgages
- Owners: Its members

The Glasgow Savings Bank, formed in 1836, had become the largest savings banks in Scotland by the mid-1850s and the largest in the country by 1870. When the trustee savings banks were reorganised into regional banks in 1975 Glasgow became the core of the West of Scotland TSB.

== History ==
=== Early history ===
The first Glasgow Savings Bank was formed in 1815 but, like the Edinburgh Savings Bank, it became largely moribund and was replaced by a new institution. Since 1817, England and Wales savings banks had been allowed to invest with the National Debt Commissioners on beneficial terms and the Savings Bank Act 1835 extended this right to Scotland. Alexander Gray, an accountant, had published a pamphlet extoling the virtues of the Savings Bank Act 1835, and organised a meeting of “prominent Glaswegian gentlemen” in March 1836. A public meeting was held and the new bank opened in the July, functioning out of two rooms in Hutcheson's Hospital and open to receive deposits from one shilling to £30. The rules adopted were modelled on the recently formed Edinburgh and Exeter savings banks with Gray, briefly, as its first Actuary. The early formal name was the National Security Bank of Scotland, later the Savings Bank of Glasgow but more popularly referred to as the Glasgow Savings Bank.

Within four years the bank had 12,000 accounts and £155,000 of deposits. Larger premises were taken in 1843 in Merchants’ House Buildings and in 1853 the trustees acquired their own building for the first time at Wilson Street. Eventually, in 1866, the bank was able to build its own office in Gosforth Street. The bank had been active from its early years in its attention to depositors, with daily opening and easier withdrawal on demand. It also encouraged the newly established penny banks by opening receiving agencies for their deposits in surrounding districts; the bank had 97 of these agencies by 1870. But above all, the Glasgow Savings Bank benefitted from the guidance of William Meikle; he joined the joined staff in 1840 and became actuary in 1848, finally retiring in 1903. He was credited with laying the foundations of the bank, establishing the bookkeeping on a sound system. Horne described him as “one of the outstanding figures of savings bank history in the nineteenth century”.

By the mid-1850s. the Glasgow Savings Bank had become the largest in Scotland, and sixth nationally, with approaching £700,000 deposits. However, the bank faced a substantial challenge in the financial crisis of 1857. There had already been difficulties in the financial panic of 1847 when there had been net withdrawals of £85,000. The 1857 crisis was more localised. The second largest of the Scottish banks, the Western Bank of Scotland, with 100 branches and £5m of liabilities, collapsed. This was followed by the City of Glasgow Bank suspending withdrawals for one month. To protect itself from withdrawals, the Glasgow Savings Bank trustees drew £100,000 from the National Debt Commissioners, almost one sixth of its funds. With that crisis behind it, the Glasgow Savings Bank continued to grow and by 1870 it had become the largest savings bank, not only in Scotland but the whole country. But Meikle was now to take decisions which were to substantially increase the scale of the bank.

A new head office, designed by John Burnet in the Italianate style, was opened in Ingram Street in 1866.

In 1870, as with one or two English savings banks, Meikle explored the legality of opening a special investment department, which could offer better terms to depositors. Deciding that it was lawful, the investment department was opened in January 1871. Initially, it would only take deposits from customers of five years standing, and funds were invested in debentures of Glasgow Corporation; by the end of the following year, £100,000 of deposits had been taken. The other significant step was the opening of branches. It was decided that the needs of the city could not be satisfied from one office and in 1869 the first branch was opened in Bridgeton Cross, followed by three more in 1871 and 1872 in the west, north and south of the city.

By 1878, deposits were in excess of £3m but there was yet another Scottish banking crisis as the City of Glasgow Bank collapsed with a deficit of £6m. The effect on the Savings Bank was minimal; the number of depositors fell 168 but rose in the following year by 5,884 and within five years deposits had exceeded £4m. Two more branches were opened in the 1880s and two more in the 1890s but from 1900 branches were opened at more frequent intervals, sometimes outside the city boundaries. By 1936 the branch network totalled 33, of which 24 were in the city; six more were added before the start of WWII. One of the bank's other successes had been its early introduction of a special investment department but it was later realised that the 1891 act had introduced unexpected restrictions and some of the lending operations were illegal. The bank suspended the operations of the investment department and in 1896 transferred the funds to an investment trust registered under the Companies Act. In 1897 the investment trust held £641,000 funds but by 1900 this had increased to £1.9m. Eventually the 1904 Act allowed the reestablishment of investment departments.

The final plank in the bank's growth was the acquisition of smaller savings banks. After WWI amalgamations were being encouraged and the smaller banks also recognised that they needed access to better resources. In turn, the Glasgow Savings Bank feared the encirclement by branches of banks with no connection to Glasgow. The Motherwell Savings Bank had previously approached Glasgow and eventually it was acquired in 1929; six more savings banks were bought in the 1930s. By 1935 Glasgow was sstill comfortably the largest saavings bank in the country, twice the size of the Edinburgh Savings Bank.

=== Acquisitions Inter-war Years ===
- Motherwell Savings Bank, 1929
- Carluke Savings Bank, 1930
- Hamilton Savings Bank, 1930
- Dunoon Savings Bank 1931
- Ayr Trustee Savings Bank 1933
- Kilmarnock Savings Bank 1937
- Lennoxtown (Campsie) Savings Bank, 1938

=== Post-war Growth ===
The bank changed substantially in the thirty years between 1945 and 1975. Branch openings continued with a further ten by 1950 and 29 in total by the time the last one opened in 1972. There were also a few small acquisitions. The Helensburgh Savings Bank had merged during the War, closely followed by Clark's Bank of Darvel in 1946; after that it was only the savings banks at Kirkintilloch and Sanquhar in 1960 and 1961. The growth in funds due to organic development and a greater range of services was amplified by inflation. Total funds had reached £50m by 1941, £100m by 1956 and £200m in 1972. That was the first year since 1870 that Glasgow Savings Bank had not been number one in the industry, a result of the merger of the London TSB and the South Eastern TSB with combined funds of £250m.

In 1973, the Page Committee report recommended that the trustee savings banks should be reorganised into regional banks. In Scotland this resulted in the formation of four regional savings banks, Glasgow becoming the core of the West of Scotland TSB. Glasgow, with £262m funds, and Paisley (£46m) merged in November 1974 to form The West of Scotland TSB. In 1975 the Campbeltown and District Savings Bank (£2m) joined followed in 1976 by Greenock Provident TSB j(£14m) and the Bute Savings Bank (£3m). The Vale of Leven with a tiny £0.3m joined in 1978.
