= St Martin's Place Savings Bank =

British savings bank (1816–1896)

- Type: Provident society
- Industry: Financial services
- Predecessor: Provident Institution for Savings in the Western Part of the Metropolis
- Founded: 1816
- Founder: Society for the Bettering of the Poor
- Defunct: 1896
- Fate: Closed
- Successor: General Post Office
- Headquarters: London, United Kingdom
- Area served: England
- Products: Savings accounts

St Martin’s Place Savings Bank was founded in London in 1816 and for much of the nineteenth century was the leading savings bank in the country. However, it went into decline in the latter part of the century and, in 1896, declined to accept the recommendations of the independent Inspection Committee. The Bank closed its doors and transferred the depositors’ funds to the Post Office.

== History ==
=== Provident Society or Savings Bank? ===
St. Martins was originally formed as the Provident Institution for Savings in the Western Part of the Metropolis and that in turn originated from the Society for the Bettering of the Poor. A committee was formed under the patronage of the Duke of Somerset to investigate the formation of a savings institution and the active campaigners included member of parliament and radical Joseph Hume and statistician and founder of the Thames River Police Patrick Colquhoun. The breadth of support could hardly have been greater. The Vice Presidents comprised four dukes, two marquesses, twelve earls and two bishops. As well as Hume and Colquhoun, the 61 Managers who ran the institution on a voluntary basis included, David Ricardo, Thomas Malthus, William Wilberforce, and George Rose, (best known for his 1817 Savings Act).

David Hume was determined that the new savings body should be constituted as a provident society rather than a savings bank, and modelled on the Bath Provident Institution, otherwise known after its architect, as the Haygarth model. The Bath plan gave greater flexibility but its strength lay in the manner of its investments. The savings banks invested their funds into government stocks and if these fell in value, the fall could exceed the reserves and place the managers or trustees at personal risk. In contrast, the deposits of provident institutions, once they had reached one pound, were invested in government stock in the name of the depositor. This, argued Hume in his treatise, removed the risk from the managers. He did not, however, mention that it left the depositor holding the stock.

=== The opening ===
The Provident opened in April 1816 at 11 Panton Street, Haymarket, London. Within one month, there were 338 depositors and £1,007 worth of funds. Hume’s treatise contained an extensive list of rules and regulations. Key features were that the office would open every Monday between 12 and 3p.m. and every Saturday evening between 7 and 9p.m. Deposits of not less than 6d were accepted and it was clear that all deposits were invested directly into government stock. The trustees and managers were to receive no emoluments nor be “responsible for any loss whatsoever.” This fundamental problem of risk for savings bank trustees was resolved almost immediately by Rose’s 1817 Savings Bank Act. This required the trustees to pay the depositors’ money into the Bank of England for the account of the Commissioners for the Reduction of the National Debt. The money would be kept in a separate account and trustees were guaranteed that it would be repaid pound for pound. It was presumably this which prompted the Provident Institution to rename itself the St. Martin’s Place Bank.

=== The Rise and Fall of St. Martin’s ===
All comments about St. Martins indicated that it was not only the largest savings bank but also the leading one when national issues arose One indication of size was in 1856 when St Martin’s was reported as the largest savings bank with £1.4 million of funds and over 50,000 depositors. The Bank’s influence was represented by Edward Boodle who had joined as auditor and became Comptroller and Secretary in 1841. For the next 20 years or so he was “the leading figure in the ranks of the paid officers of the savings bank.” For example, St Martin’s led the opposition to the 1844 Savings Act proposals,

St Martin’s remained “one of the very autocratic boards of management in the south”: its eight trustees, under the presidency of the Prince Consort were all members of the House of Lords. Whether or not it was this or the departure of Edward Boodle, the Bank began to grow more slowly than its competitors and then fell into absolute decline. When the Cardiff Savings Bank failed in 1886, St. Martin’s refused to join the discussions, a contrast to its leadership 30 years before. St. Martins had “unaccountably lost the inspiration of its early years and no longer even held pride of place in size and influence among the English banks.” The 1891 Savings Act established the Inspection Committee, to safeguard depositors. As a statuary body, it was able to examine the savings banks and require improvements. Many savings banks refused to make the necessary changes and closed. In 1895, the Inspection Committee asked the St. Martin’s trustees to reduce their expenditure and conduct business on more modern lines; it even wanted the removal of some of the older trustees. The trustees refused to cooperate and closed the Bank. Funds had fallen to £900,000 compared with the £1.4 million held some forty years previous. Of its total funds, over £800,000 was transferred to the Post Office.
