= Public Works Act =

Stock short title used for legislation

Public Works Act (with its variations) is a stock short title used in New Zealand and the United Kingdom for legislation relating to public works.

== List ==
=== New Zealand ===
- The Public Works Act 1876 (40 Vict No 50)
- The Public Works Act 1876 Amendment Act 1878 (42 Vict No 44)
- The Public Works Act 1879 (43 Vict No 44)
- The Public Works Act 1880 (44 Vict No 54)
- The Public Works Act 1882 (46 Vict No 37)
- The Public Works Act 1882 Amendment Act 1883 (47 Vict No 38)
- The Public Works Act 1882 Amendment Act 1884 (48 Vict No 14)
- The Public Works Act 1882 Amendment Act 1885 (49 Vict No 7)
- The Public Works Act 1882 Amendment Act (No 2) 1885 Act 1885 (49 Vict No 42)
- The Public Works Acts Amendment Act 1887 (51 Vict No 36)
- The Public Works Acts Amendment Act 1889
- The Public Works Acts Amendment Act 1892
- The Public Works Acts Amendment Act 1893
- The Public Works Act 1894
- The Public Works and Government Railways Acts Amendment Act 1895 (59 VICT 1895 No 47)
- The Public Works Acts Amendment Act 1900 (64 Vict No 47)
- The Public Works Amendment Act 1901 (1 Edw 7 No 68)
- The Public Works Act 1903 (3 Edw 7 No 93)
- The Public Works Amendment Act 1904 (4 Edw 7 No 46)
- The Public Works Amendment Act 1905 (5 Edw 7 No 10)
- The Public Works Acts Compilation Act 1905 (5 Edw 7 1905 No 53)
- The Public Works Act Amendment Act 1906 (6 Edw 7 1906 No 30)
- The Public Works Amendment Act 1908 (8 Edw 7 No 241)
- The Public Works Amendment Act 1909 (9 Edw 7 No 19)
- The Public Works Amendment Act 1910 (1 Geo 5 No 66)
- The Public Works Amendment Act 1911 (2 Geo 5 No 21)
- The Public Works Amendment Act 1913 (4 Geo 5 No 38)
- The Public Works Amendment Act 1914 (5 Geo 5 No 49)
- The Public Works Amendment Act 1923 (13 Geo 5 No 29)
- The Public Works Amendment Act 1924 (15 Geo 5 No 46)
- The Public Works Amendment Act 1925 (16 Geo 5 No 47)
- The Public Works Amendment Act 1927 (18 Geo 5 No 69)
- The Public Works Amendment Act 1928 (19 Geo 5 No 15)
- The Public Works Act 1928 (19 Geo 5 No 21)
- The Public Works Amendment Act 1935 (26 Geo 5 No 27)
- The Public Works Amendment Act 1947 (11 Geo 5 No 46)
- The Public Works Amendment Act 1948 (No 39)
- The Public Works Amendment Act 1952 (No 58)
- The Public Works Amendment Act 1953 (No 23)
- The Public Works Amendment Act 1954 (No 85)
- The Public Works Amendment Act 1955 (No 59)
- The Public Works Amendment Act 1956 (No 39)
- The Public Works Amendment Act 1958 (No 28)
- The Public Works Amendment Act 1960 (No 105)
- The Public Works Amendment Act 1961 (No 32)
- The Public Works Amendment Act 1962 (No 41)
- The Public Works Amendment Act 1963 (No 42)
- The Public Works Amendment Act 1964 (No 107)
- The Public Works Amendment Act 1965 (No 26)
- The Public Works Amendment Act 1967 (No 31)
- The Public Works Amendment Act (No 2) 1967 (No 113)
- The Public Works Amendment Act 1970 (No 145)
- The Public Works Amendment Act 1971 (No 124)
- The Public Works Amendment Act 1972 (No 96)
- The Public Works Amendment Act 1973 (No 44)
- The Public Works Amendment Act 1974 (No 16)
- The Public Works Amendment Act 1975 (No 138)
- The Public Works Amendment Act 1976 (No 165)
- The Public Works Amendment Act 1977(No 169)
- The Public Works Act 1981 (1981 No 35)
- The Public Works Amendment Act 1982 (No 182)
- The Public Works Amendment Act 1983 (No 150)
- The Public Works Amendment Act 1987 (No 62)
- The Public Works Amendment Act (No 2) 1987 (No 67)
- The Public Works Amendment Act (No 3) 1987 (No 110)
- The Public Works Amendment Act (No 4) 1987 (No 201)
- The Public Works Amendment Act 1988 (No 43)
- The Public Works Amendment Act 1991 (No 87)
- The Public Works Appropriation Act 1886 (50 Vict No 55)
- The Public Works Appropriation Act 1887 (51 Vict No 43)
- The Public Works Appropriation Act 1888
- The Public Works Appropriation Act 1889
- The Public Works Appropriation Act 1890
- The Public works Appropriation Act 1891
- The Public Works Appropriation Act 1892
- The Public Works Appropriation Act 1893
- The Public Works Appropriation Act 1894
- The Public Works Appropriation Act 1895 (59 Vict No 72)
- The Public Works Appropriation Act 1896 (60 Vict No 62)
- The Public Works Lands Act 1864 (28 Vict No 5)

=== United Kingdom ===
- The Public Works Loans Act 1967 (c. 61)
- The Public Works Loans Act 1965 (c. 63)
- The Public Works Loans Act 1964 (c. 9)
- The Public Works Loans Act 1952 (1 & 2 Eliz. 2. c. 3)
- The Public Utilities Street Works Act 1950 (14 Geo. 6. c. 39)
- The Public Works Loans Act 1946 (9 & 10 Geo. 6. c. 41)
- The Public Works Loans Act 1944 (7 & 8 Geo. 6. c. 16)
- The Public Works Loans Act 1911 (1 & 2 Geo. 5. c. 17)
- The Public Works Loans Act 1887 (50 & 51 Vict. c. 37)
- The Public Works Loans Act 1882 (45 & 46 Vict. c. 62)
- The Public Works Loans (Money) Act 1876 (39 & 40 Vict. c .31)
- The Public Works Loans Act 1875 (38 & 39 Vict. c. 89)
- The Public Works Loan Commissioners Act 1872 (35 & 36 Vict. c. 71)
- The Public Works and Fisheries Acts Amendment Act 1863 (26 & 27 Vict. c. 81)
- The Public Works Loan Act 1853 (16 & 17 Vict. c. 40)

The Public Works (Ireland) Acts 1831 to 1886 is the collective title of the following acts:

- The Public Works (Ireland) Act 1831 (1 & 2 Will. 4. c. 33)
- The Public Works (Ireland) Act 1836 (6 & 7 Will. 4. c. 108)
- The Public Works (Ireland) Act 1837 (7 Will. 4 & 1 Vict. c. 21)
- The Public Works (Ireland) Act 1839 (2 & 3 Vict. c. 50)
- The Public Works (Ireland) (No. 1) Act 1846 (9 & 10 Vict. c. 1)
- The Public Works (Ireland) (No. 2) Act 1846 (9 & 10 Vict. c. 86)
- The Public Works (Ireland) Act 1856 (19 & 20 Vict. c. 18)
- The Public Works (Ireland) Act 1861 (24 & 25 Vict. c. 71)
- The Public Works (Ireland) Act 1866 (29 & 30 Vict. c. 73)
- The Public Works (Ireland) Act 1869 (32 & 33 Vict. c. 74)
- The Public Works Loans (Ireland) Act 1877 (40 & 41 Vict. c. 27)
- The Public Works Loans (Ireland) Act 1886 (49 & 50 Vict. c. 46)

== See also ==
- List of short titles
