= Certificate of Tax Deposit =

In the United Kingdom the Certificate of Tax Deposit (CTD) scheme allowed individuals and companies to deposit money with HM Revenue and Customs before tax was due. A "Certificate of Tax Deposit" was issued as a receipt for the money deposited. HMRC paid interest on deposits. The scheme was mentioned in the National Loans Act 1968 (c. 13), but was closed on 23 November 2017.

Uses of CTDs include when a tax liability is under investigation by HMRC. Making a deposit can help stop late payment interest accruing on the amount owed while it is under investigation. If no tax is found liable, the money can be reclaimed.
