= International Monetary Fund Act 1979 =

Act of the Parliament of the United Kingdom

International Monetary Fund Act 1979 (Note: Section 7(1).)
- Act of Parliament
- Parliament of the United Kingdom
- Long title: An Act to consolidate the enactments relating to the International Monetary Fund and to repeal, as obsolete, the European Monetary Agreement Act 1959 and the entries relating to it in Schedule 2 to the National Loans Act 1968.
- Citation: 1979 c. 29
- Territorial extent: United Kingdom

Dates
- Royal assent: 4 April 1979
- Commencement: 4 May 1979 (Note: Section 7(2).)

Other legislation
- Amends: See § Repealed enactments
- Repeals/revokes: See § Repealed enactments
- Amended by: International Monetary Arrangements Act 1983

Status: Amended

Text of statute as originally enacted

Revised text of statute as amended

Text of the International Monetary Fund Act 1979 as in force today (including any amendments) within the United Kingdom, from legislation.gov.uk.

The International Monetary Fund Act 1979 (c. 29) is an act of the Parliament of the United Kingdom that consolidated enactments relating to the International Monetary Fund in the United Kingdom.

== Provisions ==
=== Repealed enactments ===
Section 6(1) of the act repealed 8 enactments, listed in parts I and II of the schedule to the act.

Part I – Consequential Repeals
Citation	Short title	Extent of repeal
9 & 10 Geo. 6. c. 19	Bretton Woods Agreements Act 1945	In the preamble, paragraph (a).
9 & 10 Geo. 6. c. 19	Bretton Woods Agreements Act 1945	In section 2, subsection (1)(b), (c) and (d), in subsection (2) the words from " and " to the end of the subsection, and in subsection (4), the words " the Fund or " and the words from " section ", in the first place where it occurs, to " and", in the third place where it occurs.
9 & 10 Geo. 6. c. 19	Bretton Woods Agreements Act 1945	In section 3, in subsection (1) the words " the Fund Agreement and ", " the Fund and " and " respective" and the words from " or any" to the end of the subsection, and in subsection (4), the words "the Fund or", in both places where they occur, and the words " of the said agreements ".
7 & 8 Eliz. 2. c. 17	International Bank and Monetary Fund Act 1959	In the preamble, the words from the beginning to " whereas", in the second place where it occurs.
10 & 11 Eliz. 2. c. 20	International Monetary Fund Act 1962	The whole act.
1968 c. 13	National Loans Act 1968	In Schedule 2, the entry relating to section 2(1) of the Bretton Woods Agreements Act 1945 and the entry relating to sums received from the International Monetary Fund.
1970 c. 49	International Monetary Fund Act 1970	The whole act.
1977 c. 6	International Finance, Trade and Aid Act 1977	Sections 1 and 2.

Part II – Obsolete Enactments
Citation	Short title	Extent of repeal
7 & 8 Eliz. 2. c. 11	European Monetary Agreement Act 1959	The whole act.
1968 c. 13	National Loans Act 1968	In Schedule 2, the entries relating to the European Monetary Agreement Act 1959.

== Subsequent developments ==
Section 2(1) of the act (which specified a limit of £357,142,857 on Treasury loans to the International Monetary Fund) was substituted, and section 2(1A) was inserted, by section 1 of the International Monetary Arrangements Act 1983, which came into force on 14 November 1983. (Note: The International Monetary Arrangements Act 1983 (Commencement) Order 1983 (SI 1983/1643).)
