= Town and Country Planning Act 1962 =

Act of the Parliament of the United Kingdom

Town and Country Planning Act 1962 (Note: Section 226(1).)
- Act of Parliament
- Parliament of the United Kingdom
- Long title: An Act to consolidate certain enactments relating to town and country planning in England and Wales.
- Citation: 10 & 11 Eliz. 2. c. 38
- Territorial extent: England and Wales (Note: Section 226(2).)

Dates
- Royal assent: 19 July 1962
- Commencement: 1 April 1963 (Note: Section 225.)
- Repealed: 24 August 1990
Other legislation
Amends	See § Repealed enactments
Repeals/revokes	See § Repealed enactments
Amended by	London Government Act 1963; Compulsory Purchase Act 1965; New Towns Act 1965; Rent Act 1965; Local Government Act 1966; Forestry Act 1967; National Loans Act 1968; Town and Country Planning Act 1971; Statute Law (Repeals) Act 1975; Civil Aviation Act 1982; Statute Law (Repeals) Act 1989
Repealed by	Planning (Listed Buildings and Conservation Areas) Act 1990

Status: Repealed

Text of statute as originally enacted

The Town and Country Planning Act 1962 (10 & 11 Eliz. 2. c. 38) was an act of the Parliament of the United Kingdom that consolidated enactments related to town and country planning in England and Wales.

== Provisions ==
=== Repealed enactments ===
Section 223(2) of the act repealed 13 enactments, listed in the fifteenth schedule to the act.

Citation	Short title	Extent of repeal
7 & 8 Geo. 6. c. 47	Town and Country Planning Act 1944	The whole act.
10 & 11 Geo. 6. c. 51	Town and Country Planning Act 1947	The whole act, except section forty-six, subsection (8) of section forty-nine, subsection (1) of section one hundred and thirteen, so much of subsection (1) of section one hundred and nineteen as defines the expressions "land" and "local authority", section one hundred and twenty, and so much of the Eighth Schedule as does not consist of amendments of the Town and Country Planning Act 1944.
12, 13 & 14 Geo. 6. c. 32	Special Roads Act 1949	Subsections (2) and (4) of section nine.
14 Geo. 6. c. 39	Public Utilities Street Works Act 1950	In the Fifth Schedule, the entry relating to the Town and Country Planning Act 1947.
14 & 15 Geo. 6. c. 19	Town and Country Planning (Amendment) Act 1951	The whole act.
14 & 15 Geo. 6. c. 60	Mineral Workings Act 1951	Subsection (1) of section fourteen. Subsections (2) and (3) of section thirty-one. Subsection (3) of section forty-three in so far as it relates to the Town and Country Planning Act 1947.
1 & 2 Eliz. 2. c. 16	Town and Country Planning Act 1953	The whole act.
2 & 3 Eliz. 2. c. 72	Town and Country Planning Act 1954	Sections one to twenty-nine. Sections thirty-eight to fifty-two. Section fifty-four. Sections fifty-seven to sixty. Section sixty-one, except subsections (1) and (6). Sections sixty-two to sixty-eight. In section sixty-nine, subsections (3) to (5), and subsections (7) and (8). In section seventy-one, subsection (2) and subsections (4) to (6). The First, Second, Third and Fourth Schedules. The Seventh Schedule, except the entry relating to the Mineral Workings Act 1951. The Eighth Schedule.
5 & 6 Eliz. 2. c. 56	Housing Act 1957	In the Tenth Schedule, the entry relating to the Town and Country Planning Act 1944.
7 & 8 Eliz. 2. c. 25	Highways Act 1959	In the Twenty-second Schedule, the entry relating to the Town and Country Planning Act 1947. In the Twenty-fourth Schedule, in paragraph 37, the words from "either of the following enactments" to the end of sub-paragraph (a).
7 & 8 Eliz. 2. c. 53	Town and Country Planning Act 1959	Sections thirty-one and thirty-two. Sections thirty-five to forty-four. Section fifty-one. Subsections (1) to (3) and subsections (5) and (6) of section fifty-two. Sections fifty-three to fifty-six. In section fifty-seven, subsections (5), (6), (8) and (9). In section fifty-eight, paragraph (b) of subsection (1) and subsections (2), (5) and (6). The Fifth and Sixth Schedules. In the Seventh Schedule, the entries relating to the Town and Country Planning Act 1947 and the Town and Country Planning Act 1954. The Eighth and Ninth Schedules.
3 & 9 Eliz. 2. c. 18	Local Employment Act 1960	Sections sixteen to nineteen. In section twenty-one, the words "and in the Town and Country Planning Act, 1947". Subsection (1) of section twenty-two. Subsections (1) and (3) of section twenty-six.
3 & 9 Eliz. 2. c. 62	Caravan Sites and Control of Development Act 1960	Sections twenty-one and twenty-two. Sections thirty-three to forty-seven. Subsection (2) of section forty-eight. The Third Schedule. The Fourth Schedule, except the entry relating to the Public Health Act 1936.

== Subsequent developments ==
The whole act, except sections 222, 224 and 226 and schedule 12, was repealed by section 292(2) of, and schedule 25 to, the Town and Country Planning Act 1971 (c. 78), which came into operation on 1 April 1972.

The whole act was repealed by section 3 of, and part I of schedule 1 to, the Planning (Listed Buildings and Conservation Areas) Act 1990, which came into force on 24 August 1990.
