= Military Lands Act 1892 =

Act of the Parliament of the United Kingdom

Military Lands Act 1892 (Note: Section 29.)
- Act of Parliament
- Parliament of the United Kingdom
- Long title: An Act to consolidate and amend certain Enactments relating to the Acquisition of Land for Military Purposes.
- Citation: 55 & 56 Vict. c. 43
- Territorial extent: United Kingdom

Dates
- Royal assent: 27 June 1892
- Commencement: 27 June 1892 (Note: The Acts of Parliament (Commencement) Act 1793.)

Other legislation
- Amends: See § Repealed enactments
- Repeals/revokes: See § Repealed enactments
- Amended by: Military Lands Act 1900; Statute Law Revision Act 1908; Territorial Army and Militia Act 1921; Local Government Act 1933; London Government Act 1939; Acquisition of Land (Authorisation Procedure) Act 1946; Local Government (Scotland) Act 1947; Statute Law Revision Act 1948; National Assistance Act 1959; Crown Estate Act 1961; London Government Act 1963; Public Works Loans Act 1964; Defence (Transfer of Functions) (No. 1) Order 1964; National Loans Act 1968; Statute Law (Repeals) Act 1973; Supply Powers Act 1975; Criminal Procedure (Scotland) Act 1975; Criminal Law Act 1977; Highways Act 1980; Roads (Northern Ireland) Order 1980; Criminal Justice Act 1982; Roads (Scotland) Act 1984; Fines and Penalties (Northern Ireland) Order 1984; Duchy of Lancaster Act 1988; Local Government and Housing Act 1989; Atomic Weapons Establishment Act 1991; Statute Law (Repeals) Act 1993; Arbitration Act 1996; Abolition of Feudal Tenure etc. (Scotland) Act 2000; Planning and Compulsory Purchase Act 2004 (Corresponding Amendments) Order 2007; Armed Forces Act 2011; Crown Estate Transfer Scheme 2017

Status: Partially repealed

Text of statute as originally enacted

Revised text of statute as amended

Text of the Military Lands Act 1892 as in force today (including any amendments) within the United Kingdom, from legislation.gov.uk.

The Military Lands Act 1892 (55 & 56 Vict. c. 43) is an act of the Parliament of the United Kingdom that consolidated enactments related to the acquisition of land for military purposes in the United Kingdom.

== Provisions ==
=== Repealed enactments ===
Section 28 of the act repealed 7 enactments, listed in the schedule to the act.

Citation	Short title	Extent of repeal
22 Vict. c. 12	Defence Act 1859	Section one.
26 & 27 Vict. c. 65	Volunteer Act 1863	Sections thirty-one to forty inclusive.
34 & 35 Vict. c. 86	Regulation of the Forces Act 1871	Section seventeen.
48 & 49 Vict. c. 36	Artillery and Rifle Ranges Act 1885	The whole act, except section three.
49 & 50 Vict. c. 5	Drill Grounds Act 1886	The whole act.
53 & 54 Vict. c. 25	Barracks Act 1890	Sections two and three.
54 & 55 Vict. c. 54	Ranges Act 1891	The whole act, except section eleven so far as that section relates to the acquisition of land under the Defence Act 1842, and the Acts amending the same.

== Subsequent developments ==
Section 19 of the act, which applied the act to yeomanry corps, was repealed by section 4(1) of, and schedule 2 to, the Territorial Army and Militia Act 1921 (11 & 12 Geo. 5. c. 37).

Section 7 of the act, which provided for loans by the Public Works Loan Commissioners, was repealed by schedule 6 part II of the National Loans Act 1968 (c. 13).

Section 9, which governed the rules as to the exercise of powers by volunteer corps, and in section 24, the words from " Provided also " onwards, were repealed by section 1(1) of, and schedule 1 part IX to, the Statute Law (Repeals) Act 1973 (1973 c. 39).
