= Statute Law Revision Act 1963 =

Act of the Parliament of the United Kingdom

Statute Law Revision Act 1963 (Note: Section 3.)
- Act of Parliament
- Parliament of the United Kingdom
- Long title: An Act to revise the statute law by repealing obsolete, spent, unnecessary or superseded enactments.
- Citation: 1963 c. 30
- Territorial extent: United Kingdom

Dates
- Royal assent: 31 July 1963
- Commencement: 31 July 1963 (Note: The Acts of Parliament (Commencement) Act 1793)
- Repealed: 27 June 1974
Other legislation
Amended by	Northern Ireland Constitution Act 1973
Repealed by	Statute Law (Repeals) Act 1974
Relates to	Repeal of Obsolete Statutes Act 1956; See Statute Law Revision Act

Status: Repealed

Text of statute as originally enacted

The Statute Law Revision Act 1963 (c. 30) was an act of the Parliament of the United Kingdom.

== Provisions ==
=== Repealed enactments ===
Section 1 of the act repealed 223 enactments, listed in the schedule to the act.

Citation	Short title	Description	Extent of repeal
18 Edw. 3. Stat. 3. c. 5	Prohibitions	Prohibitions.	The whole Chapter.
50 Edw. 3. c. 4	N/A	Prohibition shall not be allowed, after consultation granted.	The whole Chapter, in its application to Northern Ireland.
4 Geo. 2. c. 32	Theft Act 1730	The Theft Act 1730.	The whole act.
48 Geo. 3. c. 110	Herring Fishery (Scotland) Act 1808	The Herring Fishery (Scotland) Act 1808.	Section 10. In section 11, the words from " to be appointed " to " of this Act " (where secondly occurring), and the words from " Which oath " onwards. Sections 12, 18, 31, 32, 34 to 38, 40 to 45, 47, 49, 51, 54, 58 and 59.
55 Geo. 3. c. 94	Herring Fishery (Scotland) Act 1815	The Herring Fishery (Scotland) Act 1815.	Sections 1, 10, 12, 14, 15, 17, 18, 20, 21, 23, 31 to 33, 38, 40 and 43.
55 Geo. 3. c. 128	Admiralty (Signal Stations) Act 1815	The Admiralty (Signal Stations) Act 1815.	The whole act.
4 Geo. 4. c. 35	Statutory Commissioners Act 1823	The Statutory Commissioners Act 1823.	The whole act.
4 Geo. 4. c. 61	Court of Chancery (Ireland) Act 1823	The Court of Chancery (Ireland) Act 1823.	Section 12. In section 57, the words from " or for the lord keeper " to " time being " and the words " and their " and " or their ".
4 Geo. 4. c. 80	Lascars Act 1823	The Lascars Act 1823.	The whole act.
6 Geo. 4. c. 42	Bankers (Ireland) Act 1825	The Bankers (Ireland) Act 1825.	The whole act.
7 & 8 Geo. 4. c. 28	Criminal Law Act 1827	The Criminal Law Act 1827.	In section 1, the words " not having privilege of peerage ".
9 Geo. 4. c. 65	Bank Notes (No. 2) Act 1828	The Bank Notes (No. 2) Act 1828.	The whole act.
11 Geo. 4 & 1 Will. 4. c. 32	Banks (Ireland) Act 1830	The Banks (Ireland) Act 1830.	The whole act.
11 Geo. 4 & 1 Will. 4. c. 36	Contempt of Court Act 1830	The Contempt of Court Act 1830.	In section 15, rule 7, in rule 16, the words " or upon any report to be made in pursuance of this Act ", and rules 17 and 18. In section 18, the words from " and vice-chancellor " onwards. In section 21, the words " or any conveyance, transfer, matter, or thing " and the words from " and several " to " thing respectively ".
11 Geo. 4 & 1 Will. 4. c. 39	Transportation Act 1830	The Transportation Act 1830.	The whole act.
11 Geo. 4 & 1 Will. 4. c. 54	Fisheries (Scotland) Act 1830	The Fisheries (Scotland) Act 1830.	Sections 2, 3 and 5.
11 Geo. 4 & 1 Will. 4. c. 69	Court of Session Act 1830	The Court of Session Act 1830.	In section 21, the words from " and all applications " onwards.
11 Geo. 4 & 1 Will. 4. c. 70	Law Terms Act 1830	The Law Terms Act 1830.	In section 15, the words from " save and except " onwards.
11 Geo. 4 & 1 Will. 4. c. 71	Acts of Parliament (Mistaken References) Act 1830	The Acts of Parliament (Mistaken References) Act 1830.	The whole act.
1 Will. 4. c. 22	Evidence on Commission Act 1831	The Evidence on Commission Act 1831.	The whole act.
6 & 7 Will. 4. c. 87	Liberties Act 1836	The Liberties Act 1836.	In section 12, the words from the beginning to " and thenceforth ". Sections 13 and 14.
7 Will. 4 & 1 Vict. c. 53	Liberty of Ely Act 1837	The Liberty of Ely Act 1837.	Sections 1 to 4.
1 & 2 Vict. c. 2	Civil List Act 1837	The Civil List Act 1837.	In section 14, the words " or of the duties of one shilling and six pence respectively ".
1 & 2 Vict. c. 96	Joint Stock Banks Act 1838	The Joint Stock Banks Act 1838.	The whole act.
6 & 7 Vict. c. 82	Evidence by Commission Act 1843	The Evidence by Commission Act 1843.	The whole act.
8 & 9 Vict. c. 37	Bankers (Ireland) Act 1845	The Bankers (Ireland) Act 1845.	Section 22.
9 & 10 Vict. c. 20	Parliamentary Deposits Act 1846	The Parliamentary Deposits Act 1846.	The whole act.
13 & 14 Vict. c. 26	Piracy Act 1850	The Piracy Act 1850.	Sections 2 and 3. Schedule (A).
14 & 15 Vict. c. 26	Herring Fishery Act 1851	The Herring Fishery Act 1851.	Sections 3 and 4. In section 8, the words " or by this Act ", the words " or this Act, " and the words " the secretary of the board for the time being, or ". In section 9, the words " or this Act ".
14 & 15 Vict. c. 102	Seamen's Fund Winding-up Act 1851	The Seamen's Fund Winding-up Act 1851.	The whole act.
16 & 17 Vict. c. 107	Customs Consolidation Act 1853	The Customs Consolidation Act 1853.	In section 327, the words " or within the limits of the East India Company's charter (excepting the possessions of the said Company) ".
16 & 17 Vict. c. 113	Common Law Procedure Amendment Act (Ireland) 1853	The Common Law Procedure Amendment Act (Ireland) 1853.	In section 135, the words from " or of the Court " to " Superior Court of Common Law ", the words from " or the Commissioners " to " the Court of Common Law ", and the words from " or Court of Common Law " to " Incumbered Estates ".
16 & 17 Vict. c. 131	Merchant Shipping Law Amendment Act 1853	The Merchant Shipping Law Amendment Act 1853.	Section 29.
17 & 18 Vict. c. 94	Public Revenue and Consolidated Fund Charges Act 1854	The Public Revenue and Consolidated Fund Charges Act 1854.	In Schedule (A), the words " performing the Duties of the Courts of Session, Justiciary, and Court of Exchequer, and of the Bill Chambers, as fixed by the Act 2 & 3 Vict. cap. 36 ", and the words " Salaries of sheriffs and sheriffs substitute, per Act 16 & 17 Vict. cap. 80 ".
17 & 18 Vict. c. 120	Merchant Shipping Repeal Act 1854	The Merchant Shipping Repeal Act 1854.	Section 15.
18 & 19 Vict. c. 36	Oxford University Act 1855	The Oxford University Act 1855.	The whole act.
19 & 20 Vict. c. 59	Revenue (Transfer of Charges) Act 1856	The Revenue (Transfer of Charges) Act 1856.	The whole act.
19 & 20 Vict. c. 92	Chancery Appeal Court (Ireland) Act 1856	The Chancery Appeal Court (Ireland) Act 1856.	Section 2. In section 3, the words " who shall have exercised the office of High Chancellor of Ireland, or ".
21 & 22 Vict. c. 11	Cambridge University Act 1858	The Cambridge University Act 1858.	The whole act.
21 & 22 Vict. c. 35	Portendic and Albreda Convention Act 1858	The Portendic and Albreda Convention Act 1858.	The whole act.
21 & 22 Vict. c. 69	Herring Fisheries (Scotland) Act 1858	The Herring Fisheries (Scotland) Act 1858.	The whole act.
21 & 22 Vict. c. 72	Landed Estates Court (Ireland) Act 1858	The Landed Estates Court (Ireland) Act 1858.	Sections 20 and 21.
22 & 23 Vict. c. 31	Court of Probate Act (Ireland) 1859	The Court of Probate Act (Ireland) 1859.	Section 35.
23 & 24 Vict. c. 124	Ecclesiastical Commissioners Act 1860	The Ecclesiastical Commissioners Act 1860.	Section 29.
23 & 24 Vict. c. 149	Court of Chancery Act 1860	The Court of Chancery Act 1860.	The whole act.
24 & 25 Vict. c. 72	White Herring Fishery (Scotland) Act 1861	The White Herring Fishery (Scotland) Act 1861.	Sections 1, 4 and 5.
24 & 25 Vict. c. 91	Revenue (No. 2) Act 1861	The Revenue (No. 2) Act 1861.	Section 35.
26 & 27 Vict. c. 12	Secretary at War Abolition Act 1863	The Secretary at War Abolition Act 1863.	Section 3.
26 & 27 Vict. c. 20	Elections in Recess Act 1863	The Elections in Recess Act 1863.	In section 1, the words " the Act of the fifty-second year of George the Third, chapter one hundred and forty-four ".
26 & 27 Vict. c. 84	Colonial Acts Confirmation Act 1863	The Colonial Acts Confirmation Act 1863.	The whole act.
28 & 29 Vict. c. 22	Herring Fisheries (Scotland) Act 1865	The Herring Fisheries (Scotland) Act 1865.	The whole act.
28 & 29 Vict. c. 48	Courts of Justice Building Act 1865	The Courts of Justice Building Act 1865.	Sections 2 and 4.
29 & 30 Vict. c. 25	Exchequer Bills and Bonds Act 1866	The Exchequer Bills and Bonds Act 1866.	In section 7, the words " or out of the growing produce thereof ". Section 28.
30 & 31 Vict. c. 75	Office and Oath Act 1867	The Office and Oath Act 1867.	Sections 1 and 3.
31 & 32 Vict. c. 88	Court of Chancery and Exchequer Funds (Ireland) Act 1868	The Court of Chancery and Exchequer Funds (Ireland) Act 1868.	In section 2, the words " or the growing produce thereof ".
32 & 33 Vict. c. 42	Irish Church Act 1869	The Irish Church Act 1869.	In section 63, the words " or the growing produce thereof ".
32 & 33 Vict. c. 91	Courts of Justice (Salaries and Funds) Act 1869	The Courts of Justice (Salaries and Funds) Act 1869.	In section 3, the definitions of " Court of Chancery " and " Court of Admiralty ". Sections 11 to 14, 30, 32 and 33. Schedule 1. In Schedule 2, Part II. Schedules 3 and 4.
33 & 34 Vict. c. 71	National Debt Act 1870	The National Debt Act 1870.	Section 70.
34 & 35 Vict. c. 36	Pensions Commutation Act 1871	The Pensions Commutation Act 1871.	In section 11, the words " or the growing produce thereof ". Section 13.
34 & 35 Vict. c. 86	Regulation of the Forces Act 1871	The Regulation of the Forces Act 1871.	The Schedule.
35 & 36 Vict. c. 61	Steam Whistles Act 1872	The Steam Whistles Act 1872.	The whole act, except in its application to Northern Ireland.
35 & 36 Vict. c. 67	Greenwich Hospital Act 1872	The Greenwich Hospital Act 1872.	The Schedule.
35 & 36 Vict. c. 68	Military Forces Localisation Act 1872	The Military Forces Localisation Act 1872.	The Schedule.
38 & 39 Vict. c. 45	Sinking Fund Act 1875	The Sinking Fund Act 1875.	In section 5, the words " or the growing produce thereof ".
38 & 39 Vict. c. 58	Public Works Loans (Money) Act 1875	The Public Works Loans (Money) Act 1875.	In section 4, the words " or out of the growing produce thereof ".
38 & 39 Vict. c. 89	Public Works Loans Act 1875	The Public Works Loans Act 1875.	Section 15.
39 & 40 Vict. c. 18	Treasury Solicitor Act 1876	The Treasury Solicitor Act 1876.	In section 4(3), the words " or the growing produce thereof ".
39 & 40 Vict. c. 70	Sheriff Courts (Scotland) Act 1876	The Sheriff Courts (Scotland) Act 1876.	Section 53.
40 & 41 Vict. c. 2	Treasury Bills Act 1877	The Treasury Bills Act 1877.	In section 5, the words " or the growing produce thereof ".
40 & 41 Vict. c. 31	Limited Owners Reservoirs and Water Supply Further Facilities Act 1877	The Limited Owners Reservoirs and Water Supply Further Facilities Act 1877.	The whole act, except in its application to Northern Ireland.
40 & 41 Vict. c. 57	Supreme Court of Judicature Act (Ireland) 1877	The Supreme Court of Judicature Act (Ireland) 1877.	In section 20, the words " or the growing produce thereof ". In section 73, the words from the beginning to " Supreme Court " (where first occurring), the words " notwithstanding that the patronage thereof may be vested in an existing judge " and the words " Subject to the provisions of this Act preserving their patronage to existing judges ". In section 85, the words " or out of the growing produce thereof ".
43 & 44 Vict. c. 20	Inland Revenue Act 1880	The Inland Revenue Act 1880.	In Schedule 3, the first three entries.
44 & 45 Vict. c. 62	Veterinary Surgeons Act 1881	The Veterinary Surgeons Act 1881.	Sections 15 and 17.
44 & 45 Vict. c. 64	Central Criminal Court (Prisons) Act 1881	The Central Criminal Court (Prisons) Act 1881.	In the Schedule, the words " 25 & 26 Vict. c. 65 . . . The Jurisdiction in Homicides Act 1862 ".
45 & 46 Vict. c. 49	Militia Act 1882	The Militia Act 1882.	Section 53(10).
45 & 46 Vict. c. 62	Public Works Loans Act 1882	The Public Works Loans Act 1882.	Section 6.
45 & 46 Vict. c. 72	Revenue, Friendly Societies, and National Debt Act 1882	The Revenue, Friendly Societies, and National Debt Act 1882.	In section 25, the words from " with this qualification " onwards.
46 & 47 Vict. c. 1	Consolidated Fund (Permanent Charges Redemption) Act 1883	The Consolidated Fund (Permanent Charges Redemption) Act 1883.	In section 2(3), the words " or the growing produce thereof ".
47 & 48 Vict. c. 23	National Debt (Conversion of Stock) Act 1884	The National Debt (Conversion of Stock) Act 1884.	In section 9, the definition of " person ".
47 & 48 Vict. c. 31	Colonial Prisoners Removal Act 1884	The Colonial Prisoners Removal Act 1884.	In section 16(2), the words from " nor any provisions " onwards.
48 & 49 Vict. c. 11	Egyptian Loan Act 1885	The Egyptian Loan Act 1885.	The whole act.
48 & 49 Vict. c. 61	Secretary for Scotland Act 1885	The Secretary for Scotland Act 1885.	In the Schedule, in Part I, the entries relating to public health, vaccination, general police, division of burghs into wards, county general assessment, locomotives regulation, food and drugs, local taxation returns and parliamentary divisions; Part II; and, in Part III, the entry relating to the Board of Manufactures.
49 & 50 Vict. c. 13	Cape Race Lighthouse Act 1886	The Cape Race Lighthouse Act 1886.	The whole act.
50 & 51 Vict. c. 46	Truck Amendment Act 1887	The Truck Amendment Act 1887.	Section 18(1).
50 & 51 Vict. c. 52	Secretary for Scotland Act 1887	The Secretary for Scotland Act 1887.	Section 3 (a), (b), (c) and (f).
52 & 53 Vict. c. 23	Herring Fishery (Scotland) Act 1889	The Herring Fishery (Scotland) Act 1889.	Section 5.
52 & 53 Vict. c. 30	Board of Agriculture Act 1889	The Board of Agriculture Act 1889.	In section 4, the second proviso. In Schedule 1, in Part II, the entries relating to the following Acts, namely, the Tithe Act 1837, the Extraordinary Tithe Redemption Act 1886, the Public Money Drainage Acts of 1846, 1847, 1848, 1850, 1851 and 1856, the Land Drainage Act 1847, the Land Drainage Act 1861, the Public Health (Scotland) Act 1867, the Limited Owners Reservoirs and Water Supply Further Facilities Act 1877, the Crown Lands Act 1852, the Universities and College Estates Act 1858, the Universities and College Estates Act Extension 1860, the Universities and College Estates Amendment Act 1880 and the Agricultural Holdings (England) Act 1883.
52 & 53 Vict. c. 39	Judicial Factors (Scotland) Act 1889	The Judicial Factors (Scotland) Act 1889.	In section 1, the proviso. Sections 3, 4, 8 and 9.
53 & 54 Vict. c. 24	Deeds of Arrangement Amendment Act 1890	The Deeds of Arrangement Amendment Act 1890.	In section 2(1), the words " or a local court of bankruptcy " and the words " or local court of bankruptcy, as the case may be ". In section 2(3) and (5), the words " or a local court of bankruptcy ". Section 4(1)(c).
53 & 54 Vict. c. 37	Foreign Jurisdiction Act 1890	The Foreign Jurisdiction Act 1890.	So much of Schedule 2 as relates to the Act 24 & 25 Vict. c. 31.
54 & 55 Vict. c. 24	Public Accounts and Charges Act 1891	The Public Accounts and Charges Act 1891.	Section 4(3).
54 & 55 Vict. c. 28	Branding of Herrings (Northumberland) Act 1891	The Branding of Herrings (Northumberland) Act 1891.	The whole act.
54 & 55 Vict. c. 31	Mail Ships Act 1891	The Mail Ships Act 1891.	The whole act.
54 & 55 Vict. c. 48	Purchase of Land (Ireland) Act 1891	The Purchase of Land (Ireland) Act 1891.	In section 15(9), the words " or the growing produce thereof ".
56 & 57 Vict. c. 1	Coinage Act 1893	The Coinage Act 1893.	The whole act.
57 & 58 Vict. c. 60	Merchant Shipping Act 1894	The Merchant Shipping Act 1894.	Section 125(5).
58 & 59 Vict. c. 19	Court of Session Consignations (Scotland) Act 1895	The Court of Session Consignations (Scotland) Act 1895.	Sections 7 and 8. In section 14, the words " or the growing produce thereof ".
61 & 62 Vict. c. 37	Local Government (Ireland) Act 1898	The Local Government (Ireland) Act 1898.	Section 73.
62 & 63 Vict. c. 30	Commons Act 1899	The Commons Act 1899.	In section 7, the words " without licence in mortmain ".
62 & 63 Vict. c. 46	Improvement of Land Act 1899	The Improvement of Land Act 1899.	In Schedule 1, the words " 40 & 41 Vict. c. 31—The Limited Owners Reservoirs and Water Supply Further Facilities Act 1877 ".
63 Vict. Sess. 2. c. 3	Second Session (Explanation) Act 1899	The Second Session (Explanation) Act 1899.	The whole act.
63 & 64 Vict. c. 19	Land Registry (New Buildings) Act 1900	The Land Registry (New Buildings) Act 1900.	Section 3.
63 & 64 Vict. c. 24	Veterinary Surgeons Amendment Act 1900	The Veterinary Surgeons Amendment Act 1900.	The whole act.
1 Edw. 7. c. 4	Civil List Act 1901	The Civil List Act 1901.	The whole act.
2 Edw. 7. c. 36	Mail Ships Act 1902	The Mail Ships Act 1902.	The whole act.
3 Edw. 7. c. 37	Irish Land Act 1903	The Irish Land Act 1903.	Section 36(4) and, in section 36(7), the words from " in the first instance " to " preceding subsection, or " and the word " other ". In section 29(1), the words " or the growing produce thereof ". and, in section 29(2), the words " and shall be made good out of the Guarantee Fund ".
4 Edw. 7. c. 21	Capital Expenditure (Money) Act 1904	The Capital Expenditure (Money) Act 1904.	In section 1(3), the words " or the growing produce thereof ".
5 Edw. 7. c. 4	Finance Act 1905	The Finance Act 1905.	The whole act.
8 Edw. 7. c. 62	Local Government (Scotland) Act 1908	The Local Government (Scotland) Act 1908.	Section 7(1).
10 Edw. 7 & 1 Geo. 5. c. 8	Finance (1909–10) Act 1910	The Finance (1909-10) Act 1910.	Sections 90 and 91.
10 Edw. 7 & 1 Geo. 5. c. 28	Civil List Act 1910	The Civil List Act 1910.	Section 3. In section 8, the words " for the Civil List, and ", the words from " for Her Majesty the Queen " to " the Princess of Wales, and ", the words from " and for the payment " (where secondly occurring) to " of this Act " and the words " or the growing produce thereof ".
1 & 2 Geo. 5. c. 2	Revenue Act 1911	The Revenue Act 1911.	Section 16.
1 & 2 Geo. 5. c. 49	Small Landholders (Scotland) Act 1911	The Small Landholders (Scotland) Act 1911.	In section 3(9), the words " or the growing produce thereof ".
4 & 5 Geo. 5. c. 31	Housing Act 1914	The Housing Act 1914.	In section 2(1) and (3), the words " or the growing produce thereof ".
4 & 5 Geo. 5. c. 59	Bankruptcy Act 1914	The Bankruptcy Act 1914.	In section 90(4), the words " or the growing produce thereof ".
5 & 6 Geo. 5. c. 74	Police Magistrates (Superannuation) Act 1915	The Police Magistrates (Superannuation) Act 1915.	In section 1(4), the words " or the growing produce thereof ".
5 & 6 Geo. 5. c. 89	Finance (No. 2) Act 1915	The Finance (No. 2) Act 1915.	Section 50.
9 & 10 Geo. 5. c. 37	War Loan Act 1919	The War Loan Act 1919.	In section 1(3) and (5), the words " or the growing produce thereof ". In section 3(3), the words " or the growing produce thereof ".
10 & 11 Geo. 5. c. 55	Emergency Powers Act 1920	The Emergency Powers Act 1920.	In section 2 (4), the words from " and regulations " onwards.
11 & 12 Geo. 5. c. 32	Finance Act 1921	The Finance Act 1921.	In section 45(1), the words " or the growing produce thereof ".
10 & 11 Geo. 5. c. 67	Government of Ireland Act 1920	The Government of Ireland Act 1920.	In sections 32(6), 34(1), 54(1) and 57(1), the words " or the growing produce thereof ".
12 & 13 Geo. 5. c. 24	Government of Northern Ireland (Loan Guarantee) Act 1922	The Government of Northern Ireland (Loan Guarantee) Act 1922.	In section 1(3), the words " or the growing produce thereof ".
12 & 13 Geo. 5. c. 50	Expiring Laws Act 1922	The Expiring Laws Act 1922.	In Schedule 1, the entries numbered (8), (13), (15), (16), (17), (18) and (20).
13 Geo. 5. Sess. 2. c. 4	Trade Facilities and Loans Guarantee Act 1922	The Trade Facilities and Loans Guarantee Act 1922 (Session 2).	Section 2. In section 5(1), the words from " in respect " (where first occurring) to " Government, or ", the words from " or required " to " Treasury under this Act " and the words " or the growing produce thereof ", and, in section 5(2), the words from " in respect " (where first occurring) to " Government, or ", the words " and of any securities issued by the Treasury under this Act ", the words " or for meeting the principal of or the interest on any securities so issued by the Treasury " and the words " securities or ". Section 6(2).
13 & 14 Geo. 5. c. 21	Forestry (Transfer of Woods) Act 1923	The Forestry (Transfer of Woods) Act 1923.	Section 1(4). In section 3, the words " or the growing produce thereof ".
14 & 15 Geo. 5. c. 8	Trade Facilities Act 1924	The Trade Facilities Act 1924.	Section 2. In section 5, the words from " and the Trade Facilities Acts " onwards.
15 & 16 Geo. 5. c. 19	Trustee Act 1925	The Trustee Act 1925.	In section 6, the words " the Public Money Drainage Acts 1846 to 1856 or ".
15 & 16 Geo. 5. c. 49	Supreme Court of Judicature (Consolidation) Act 1925	The Supreme Court of Judicature (Consolidation) Act 1925.	In section 15(a), the words " or the growing produce thereof ".
16 & 17 Geo. 5. c. 62	East Africa Loans Act 1926	The East Africa Loans Act 1926.	In section 1(3), the words " or the growing produce thereof ".
18 & 19 Geo. 5. c. 36	Naval Prize Act 1928	The Naval Prize Act 1928.	In section 1(1), the words " or the growing produce thereof ".
19 & 20 Geo. 5. c. 7	Imperial Telegraphs Act 1929	The Imperial Telegraphs Act 1929.	The whole act.
19 & 20 Geo. 5. c. 8	Appellate Jurisdiction Act 1929	The Appellate Jurisdiction Act 1929.	In section 1(4) and (6), the words " or the growing produce thereof ".
19 & 20 Geo. 5. c. 29	Government Annuities Act 1929	The Government Annuities Act 1929.	In section 8(1), the words " or out of the growing produce thereof ". In section 41(1), the words " or out of the growing produce thereof ". In section 67(6), the words " or the growing produce thereof ".
20 & 21 Geo. 5. c. 28	Finance Act 1930	The Finance Act 1930.	In section 48, the words " or the growing produce thereof. "
20 & 21 Geo. 5. c. 48	London Naval Treaty Act 1930	The London Naval Treaty Act 1930.	The whole act.
21 & 22 Geo. 5. c. 41	Agricultural Land (Utilisation) Act 1931	The Agricultural Land (Utilisation) Act 1931.	In section 22(1) and (3), the words " or the growing produce thereof ".
21 & 22 Geo. 5. c. 49	Finance (No. 2) Act 1931	The Finance (No. 2) Act 1931.	In section 17(1), the words " or the growing produce thereof ".
22 & 23 Geo. 5. c. 25	Finance Act 1932	The Finance Act 1932.	In section 24(4), the words " or the growing produce thereof ".
23 & 24 Geo. 5. c. 41	Administration of Justice (Scotland) Act 1933	The Administration of Justice (Scotland) Act 1933.	In section 6(3)(f), the words " under the Evidence by Commission Act 1843 or ".
24 & 25 Geo. 5. c. 32	Finance Act 1934	The Finance Act 1934.	In section 24, the words " or the growing produce thereof ". In section 25(3), the words " or the growing produce thereof ".
24 & 25 Geo. 5. c. 53	County Courts Act 1934	The County Courts Act 1934.	In section 9(5), the words " or the growing produce thereof ".
25 & 26 Geo. 5. c. 8	Unemployment Insurance Act 1935	The Unemployment Insurance Act 1935.	Section 105(3).
25 & 26 Geo. 5. c. 24	Finance Act 1935	The Finance Act 1935.	In section 30(1), the words " or the growing produce thereof ".
26 Geo. 5 & 1 Edw. 8. c. 15	Civil List Act 1936	The Civil List Act 1936.	In section 11, the words from " under this Act " (where first occurring) to " His Royal Highness's family ", the words from " and for the payment " (where secondly occurring) to " of this Act ", the words " or the growing produce thereof ", and the words from " and, in particular " onwards. In section 12, the words " or any of the reductions of the yearly payments, " and the words " and reductions ".
26 Geo. 5 & 1 Edw. 8. c. 19	Special Areas Reconstruction (Agreement) Act 1936	The Special Areas Reconstruction (Agreement) Act 1936.	The whole act.
26 Geo. 5 & 1 Edw. 8. c. 26	Land Registration Act 1936	The Land Registration Act 1936.	In section 5(2), the words " or the growing produce thereof " (in both places where they occur).
26 Geo. 5 & 1 Edw. 8. c. 43	Tithe Act 1936	The Tithe Act 1936.	In section 25(3), the words " or the growing produce thereof ". In section 26(1), the words " or the growing produce thereof " and, in section 26(3), the words " out of the Consolidated Fund or the growing produce thereof ".
1 Edw. 8 & 1 Geo. 6. c. 32	Civil List Act 1937	The Civil List Act 1937.	In section 13, the words " or the growing produce thereof ".
1 Edw. 8 & 1 Geo. 6. c. 35	Statutory Salaries Act 1937	The Statutory Salaries Act 1937.	Section 1(1). In section 1(2), the words " or the growing produce thereof ". In section 3, the words " or by the Lord Chancellor with the concurrence of the Treasury ". Section 5(2). Schedule 1. In Schedule 2, the entries relating to the Crown Lands Act 1829, the Crown Lands Act 1832 and the Lyon King of Arms Act 1867.
1 Edw. 8 & 1 Geo. 6. c. 38	Ministers of the Crown Act 1937	The Ministers of the Crown Act 1937.	In section 7(2), the words " or the growing produce thereof ".
1 Edw. 8 & 1 Geo. 6. c. 65	London Naval Treaty Act 1937	The London Naval Treaty Act 1937.	The whole act.
1 & 2 Geo. 6. c. 67	Supreme Court of Judicature (Amendment) Act 1938	The Supreme Court of Judicature (Amendment) Act 1938.	In section 4, the words " or the growing produce thereof ".
2 & 3 Geo. 6. c. 38	Ministry of Supply Act 1939	The Ministry of Supply Act 1939.	Section 6(3).
2 & 3 Geo. 6. c. 57	War Risks Insurance Act 1939	The War Risks Insurance Act 1939.	In section 16(2), the words " or the growing produce thereof ".
2 & 3 Geo. 6. c. 64	Currency (Defence) Act 1939	The Currency (Defence) Act 1939.	In section 1(2), the words from " or the growing produce thereof " onwards.
2 & 3 Geo. 6. c. 117	National Loans Act 1939	The National Loans Act 1939.	In section 2(5), the words " or the growing produce thereof ".
4 & 5 Geo. 6. c. 35	Colonial War Risks Insurance (Guarantee) Act 1941	The Colonial War Risks Insurance (Guarantee) Act 1941.	In section 1(3), the words " or the growing produce thereof ".
5 & 6 Geo. 6. c. 18	Royal Naval Volunteer Reserve Act 1942	The Royal Naval Volunteer Reserve Act 1942.	The whole act.
5 & 6 Geo. 6. c. 29	Allied Powers (War Service) Act 1942	The Allied Powers (War Service) Act 1942.	The whole act.
6 & 7 Geo. 6. c. 36	Emergency Powers (Isle of Man Defence) Act 1943	The Emergency Powers (Isle of Man Defence) Act 1943.	The whole act.
7 & 8 Geo. 6. c. 10	Disabled Persons (Employment) Act 1944	The Disabled Persons (Employment) Act 1944.	Section 20(3).
7 & 8 Geo. 6. c. 21	Pensions (Increase) Act 1944	The Pensions (Increase) Act 1944.	Section 3(7).
8 & 9 Geo. 6. c. 5	Representation of the People Act 1945	The Representation of the People Act 1945.	Part II. In section 38, the words " and the expression local government elector shall be construed accordingly ".
8 & 9 Geo. 6. c. 18	Local Authorities Loans Act 1945	The Local Authorities Loans Act 1945.	In section 3(1), the words " or the growing produce thereof ".
9 & 10 Geo. 6. c. 13	Finance (No. 2) Act 1945	The Finance (No. 2) Act 1945.	In section 48(1), the words " or the growing produce thereof ".
9 & 10 Geo. 6. c. 19	Bretton Woods Agreement Act 1945	The Bretton Woods Agreement Act 1945.	In sections 2(1) and (4), the words " or the growing produce thereof ".
9 & 10 Geo. 6. c. 27	Bank of England Act 1946	The Bank of England Act 1946.	In Schedule 1, in paragraph 1, the words " or the growing produce thereof ".
9 & 10 Geo. 6. c. 29	Agriculture (Artificial Insemination) Act 1946	The Agriculture (Artificial Insemination) Act 1946.	Section 4(4).
9 & 10 Geo. 6. c. 31	Ministers of the Crown (Transfer of Functions) Act 1946	The Ministers of the Crown (Transfer of Functions) Act 1946.	Section 3(3).
9 & 10 Geo. 6. c. 38	National Service (Release of Conscientious Objectors) Act 1946	The National Service (Release of Conscientious Objectors) Act 1946.	The whole act.
9 & 10 Geo. 6. c. 40	Miscellaneous Financial Provisions Act 1946	The Miscellaneous Financial Provisions Act 1946.	In section 1(3), the words " or the growing produce thereof ".
9 & 10 Geo. 6. c. 41	Public Works Loans Act 1946	The Public Works Loans Act 1946.	In section 1(1), the words " As from the first day of April, nineteen hundred and forty-six ", and the words " instead of being appointed by Parliament ". In section 1(3), the proviso.
9 & 10 Geo. 6. c. 45	United Nations Act 1946	The United Nations Act 1946.	In section 1(4), the words from " but notwithstanding " onwards.
9 & 10 Geo. 6. c. 58	Borrowing (Control and Guarantees) Act 1946	The Borrowing (Control and Guarantees) Act 1946.	In section 2(3), the words " or the growing produce thereof ".
9 & 10 Geo. 6. c. 59	Coal Industry Nationalisation Act 1946	The Coal Industry Nationalisation Act 1946.	In section 63(1), in the definition of " Consolidated Fund ", the words " and includes the growing produce thereof ".
9 & 10 Geo. 6. c. 68	New Towns Act 1946	The New Towns Act 1946.	In section 26(1), in the definition of " Consolidated Fund ", the words " and includes the growing produce thereof ".
9 & 10 Geo. 6. c. 80	Atomic Energy Act 1946	The Atomic Energy Act 1946.	Section 15(3).
9 & 10 Geo. 6. c. 81	National Health Service Act 1946	The National Health Service Act 1946.	Section 75(5).
9 & 10 Geo. 6. c. 82	Cable and Wireless Act 1946	The Cable and Wireless Act 1946.	In section 3(5), the words " or the growing produce thereof ".
10 & 11 Geo. 6. c. 9	Malta (Reconstruction) Act 1947	The Malta (Reconstruction) Act 1947.	In section 1(1), the words " or the growing produce thereof ".
11 & 12 Geo. 6. c. 2	Jersey and Guernsey (Financial Provisions) Act 1947	The Jersey and Guernsey (Financial Provisions) Act 1947.	In section 1, the words " or the growing produce thereof ".
11 & 12 Geo. 6. c. 30	Lord High Commissioner (Church of Scotland) Act 1948	The Lord High Commissioner (Church of Scotland) Act 1948.	In section 1, the words " or the growing produce thereof ".
11 & 12 Geo. 6. c. 38	Companies Act 1948	The Companies Act 1948.	In section 432(1)(a), the words " the Country Bankers Act 1826, the Bankers (Scotland) Act 1826 ". Section 459(9)(a) and (e).
11 & 12 Geo. 6. c. 46	Employment and Training Act 1948	The Employment and Training Act 1948.	In section 20(2), the words " or the growing produce thereof ".
11 & 12 Geo. 6. c. 52	Veterinary Surgeons Act 1948	The Veterinary Surgeons Act 1948.	Section 6(5), (7) and (8). Section 8(1). Section 9(1). Section 11. Section 13. In section 18(1), in its application to Northern Ireland, the words " in accordance with rules of court ", and, in section 18(4), the words from " and for the reference " onwards. Section 29. In section 31(3), the words " the Veterinary Surgeons Amendment Act 1900, the Veterinary Surgeons Act (1881) Amendment Act 1920 ".
11 & 12 Geo. 6. c. 60	Development of Inventions Act 1948	The Development of Inventions Act 1948.	In section 11(1), the words " or the growing produce thereof ".
12, 13 & 14 Geo. 6. c. 14	Export Guarantees Act 1949	The Export Guarantees Act 1949.	In section 9(2), in the definition of " Consolidated Fund ", the words " and includes the growing produce thereof ".
12, 13 & 14 Geo. 6. c. 20	Cinematograph Film Production (Special Loans) Act 1949	The Cinematograph Film Production (Special Loans) Act 1949.	In section 7(1), the words " or the growing produce thereof ". In section 8(1), the words " or the growing produce thereof ".
12, 13 & 14 Geo. 6. c. 23	Social Services (Northern Ireland Agreement) Act 1949	The Social Services (Northern Ireland Agreement) Act 1949.	In section 1(2), the words " or the growing produce thereof ".
12, 13 & 14 Geo. 6. c. 50	Colonial Loans Act 1949	The Colonial Loans Act 1949.	In section 1(4), the words " or the growing produce thereof ".
12, 13 & 14 Geo. 6. c. 68	Representation of the People Act 1949	The Representation of the People Act 1949.	In section 20(4), the words " or the growing produce thereof ".
12, 13 & 14 Geo. 6. c. 77	Armed Forces (Housing Loans) Act 1949	The Armed Forces (Housing Loans) Act 1949.	In section 1(1), the words " or the growing produce thereof ".
12, 13 & 14 Geo. 6. c. 90	Election Commissioners Act 1949	The Election Commissioners Act 1949.	In section 13(2), the words " or out of the growing produce thereof ".
12, 13 & 14 Geo. 6. c. 91	Air Corporations Act 1949	The Air Corporations Act 1949.	In section 10 (2), the words " or the growing produce thereof ".
14 Geo. 6. c. 21	Miscellaneous Financial Provisions Act 1950	The Miscellaneous Financial Provisions Act 1950.	In section 2(1) and (4), the words " or the growing produce thereof ".
14 Geo. 6. c. 34	Housing (Scotland) Act 1950	The Housing (Scotland) Act 1950.	In section 94(2), the words " or the growing produce thereof ".
14 & 15 Geo. 6. c. 11	Administration of Justice (Pensions) Act 1950	The Administration of Justice (Pensions) Act 1950.	In section 25(1), the words " or the growing produce thereof ". In Schedule 3, in paragraph 9, the words " or the growing produce thereof ".
14 & 15 Geo. 6. c. 48	Dangerous Drugs Act 1951	The Dangerous Drugs Act 1951.	Section 15(4).
15 & 16 Geo. 6 & 1 Eliz. 2. c. 2	Mr. Speaker Clifton Brown's Retirement Act 1951	Mr. Speaker Clifton Brown's Retirement Act 1951.	The whole act.
15 & 16 Geo. 6 & 1 Eliz. 2. c. 3	Expiring Laws Continuance Act 1951	The Expiring Laws Continuance Act 1951.	The whole act.
15 & 16 Geo. 6 & 1 Eliz. 2. c. 37	Civil List Act 1952	The Civil List Act 1952.	In section 8, the words " or the growing produce thereof ".
15 & 16 Geo. 6 & 1 Eliz. 2. c. 44	Customs and Excise Act 1952	The Customs and Excise Act 1952.	Section 316(6).
15 & 16 Geo. 6 & 1 Eliz. 2. c. 47	Rating and Valuation (Scotland) Act 1952	The Rating and Valuation (Scotland) Act 1952.	In section 6(1), the words from " or in appeals " to " 1857 ".
15 & 16 Geo. 6 & 1 Eliz. 2. c. 57	Marine and Aviation Insurance (War Risks) Act 1952	The Marine and Aviation Insurance (War Risks) Act 1952.	In section 5(2), the words " or the growing produce thereof ".
1 & 2 Eliz. 2. c. 5	Expiring Laws Continuance Act 1952	The Expiring Laws Continuance Act 1952.	The whole act.
1 & 2 Eliz. 2. c. 15	Iron and Steel Act 1953	The Iron and Steel Act 1953.	In section 34(1), in the definition of " the Consolidated Fund ", the words " and includes the growing produce thereof ".
2 & 3 Eliz. 2. c. 7	Air Corporations Act 1953	The Air Corporations Act 1953.	Section 3.
2 & 3 Eliz. 2. c. 9	Expiring Laws Continuance Act 1953	The Expiring Laws Continuance Act 1953.	The whole act.
2 & 3 Eliz. 2. c. 62	Post Office Savings Bank Act 1954	The Post Office Savings Bank Act 1954.	In section 19(2), the words " or the growing produce thereof " and, in section 19(3), the words " or out of the growing produce thereof ".
2 & 3 Eliz. 2. c. 63	Trustee Savings Banks Act 1954	The Trustee Savings Banks Act 1954.	In section 36(2), the words " or the growing produce thereof " and, in section 36(3), the words " or out of the growing produce thereof ".
2 & 3 Eliz. 2. c. 69	Expiring Laws Continuance Act 1954	The Expiring Laws Continuance Act 1954.	The whole act.
4 & 5 Eliz. 2. c. 22	Expiring Laws Continuance Act 1955	The Expiring Laws Continuance Act 1955.	The whole act.
4 & 5 Eliz. 2. c. 46	Administration of Justice Act 1956	The Administration of Justice Act 1956.	Sections 7(4) and 47(8). In Schedule 1, in Part I, paragraph 7(3).
5 & 6 Eliz. 2. c. 4	Expiring Laws Continuance Act 1956	The Expiring Laws Continuance Act 1956.	The whole act.
6 & 7 Eliz. 2. c. 2	Expiring Laws Continuance Act 1957	The Expiring Laws Continuance Act 1957.	The whole act.
6 & 7 Eliz. 2. c. 16	Commonwealth Institute Act 1958	The Commonwealth Institute Act 1958.	In section 2(4), the words " and power to hold land without licence in mortmain ".
7 & 8 Eliz. 2. c. 4	Expiring Laws Continuance Act 1958	The Expiring Laws Continuance Act 1958.	The whole act.
7 & 8 Eliz. 2. c. 22	County Courts Act 1959	The County Courts Act 1959.	Section 61(2)(d).
8 & 9 Eliz. 2. c. 4	Expiring Laws Continuance Act 1959	The Expiring Laws Continuance Act 1959.	The whole act.
8 & 9 Eliz. 2. c. 61	Mental Health (Scotland) Act 1960	The Mental Health (Scotland) Act 1960.	In Schedule 4, the entry relating to the Admiralty (Signal Stations) Act 1815.
9 & 10 Eliz. 2. c. 4	Expiring Laws Continuance Act 1960	The Expiring Laws Continuance Act 1960.	The whole act.
9 & 10 Eliz. 2. c. 39	Criminal Justice Act 1961	The Criminal Justice Act 1961.	In Schedule 4, in the entry relating to section 20 of the Criminal Justice Act 1948, the words from " and in paragraph (b) " onwards. In Schedule 6, in the said section 20 as therein set out, subsection (5)(b).
10 & 11 Eliz. 2. c. 4	Expiring Laws Continuance Act 1961	The Expiring Laws Continuance Act 1961.	The whole act.

== Subsequent developments ==
Section 2 of the act was repealed by section 41(1) of, and part I of schedule 6 to, the Northern Ireland Constitution Act 1973, which came into force on 18 July 1973.

The whole act was repealed by section 1 of, and part XI of the schedule to, the Statute Law (Repeals) Act 1974, which came into force on 27 June 1974.

The enactments which were repealed (whether for the whole or any part of the United Kingdom) by the act were repealed so far as they extended to the Isle of Man by section 1(1) of, and schedule 1 to, the Statute Law Revision (Isle of Man) Act 1991, which came into force on 25 July 1991.

== See also ==
- Statute Law Revision Act

== Bibliography ==
- Halsbury's Statutes,
- John Burke (General editor). Current Law Statutes Annotated 1963. Sweet & Maxwell, Stevens & Sons. London. W Green & Son. Edinburgh. 1963.
- HL Deb vol 249, cols 80 to 82.
