= Second Session (Explanation) Act 1899 =

Act of the Parliament of the United Kingdom

Second Session (Explanation) Act 1899 (Note: Section 2.)
- Act of Parliament
- Parliament of the United Kingdom
- Long title: An Act to explain References in the Acts of the last Session of Parliament to the next ensuing Session.
- Citation: 62 & 63 Vict. Sess. 2. c. 3
- Territorial extent: United Kingdom

Dates
- Royal assent: 27 October 1899
- Commencement: 27 October 1899 (Note: The Acts of Parliament (Commencement) Act 1793.)
- Repealed: 31 July 1963
Other legislation
Repealed by	Statute Law Revision Act 1963

Status: Repealed

Text of statute as originally enacted

The Second Session (Explanation) Act 1899 (62 & 63 Vict. Sess. 2. c. 3) was an act of the Parliament of the United Kingdom, given royal assent on 27 October 1899 and repealed in 1963.

It clarified that any act passed in the preceding session of Parliament, which made reference to "the next session of Parliament", should be construed as references to the session beginning in the year 1900; this was intended to avoid any ambiguities caused by a second parliamentary session in the year 1899.

== Subsequent developments ==
The whole act was repealed by section 1 of, and the schedule to, the Statute Law Revision Act 1963, which came into force on 31 July 1963.
