= Exchequer Bill Loan Commission =

The Exchequer Bill Loan Commission of the United Kingdom was set up under the Public Works Loans Act 1817 (57 Geo. 3. c. 34), to help finance public work projects that would generate employment. Commissioners included Thomas Telford and Francis Ludlow Holt.

The body continued as part of the Public Works Loan Board, but its loans were restricted to twenty years by the Public Works Loan Act 1853.
