= Advances for Public Works Act 1840 =

Act of the Parliament of the United Kingdom

- Act of Parliament
- Parliament of the United Kingdom
- Long title: An Act to authorize the Issue of Exchequer Bills for Public Works and Fisheries and Employment of the Poor.
- Citation: 3 & 4 Vict. c. 10
- Territorial extent: United Kingdom

Dates
- Royal assent: 14 April 1840
- Commencement: 14 April 1840 (Note: The Acts of Parliament (Commencement) Act 1793.)
- Repealed: 1 April 1876
Other legislation
Amended by	Statute Law Revision Act 1874 (No. 2)
Repealed by	Public Works Loans Act 1875

Status: Repealed

Text of statute as originally enacted

The Advances for Public Works Act 1840 (3 & 4 Vict. c. 10) was an act of the Parliament of the United Kingdom to provide the necessary authorisation for the provision of money (exchequer bills) to further public works and for the Employment of the Poor.

== Subsequent developments ==
The whole act was repealed by section 57 of, and the third schedule to, the Public Works Loans Act 1875 (38 & 39 Vict. c. 55), which came into force on 1 April 1876.

== See also ==
- Welfare
- Welfare state
- Office of Public Works
- Egyptian Public Works
- Department of Public Works (Kerala)
