= Bretton Woods Agreements Act 1945 =

Act of the Parliament of the United Kingdom

Bretton Woods Agreements Act 1945 (Note: Section 4.)
- Act of Parliament
- Parliament of the United Kingdom
- Long title: An Act to enable effect to be given to certain international agreements for the establishment and operation of an International Monetary Fund and an International Bank for Reconstruction and Development, and for purposes connected with the matters aforesaid.
- Citation: 9 & 10 Geo. 6. c. 19
- Territorial extent: United Kingdom

Dates
- Royal assent: 20 December 1945
- Commencement: 20 December 1945 (Note: The Acts of Parliament (Commencement) Act 1793.)
- Repealed: 13 December 1980
Other legislation
Amended by	National Loans Act 1968; International Monetary Fund Act 1979
Repealed by	Overseas Development and Co-operation Act 1980

Status: Repealed

Text of statute as originally enacted

The Bretton Woods Agreements Act 1945 (9 & 10 Geo. 6. c. 19) was an act of the Parliament of the United Kingdom that ensured UK government funding for the International Monetary Fund, and the World Bank as part of the United Nations from the Consolidated Fund.

== Provisions ==
- Preamble
- s. 1 Effect of signature of Bretton Woods agreements.
- s. 2 Financial provisions.
- s. 3 Other matters.
- s. 4 Short title.

=== Section 3 ===
The Bretton Woods Agreements Order 1946 (SR&O 1946/36), was made under this section.

== See also ==
- International law
- UK constitutional law
- Bretton Woods Conference

== Bibliography ==
- M M Wells (ed). "The Bretton Woods Agreements Act, 1945". Halsbury's Statutes of England. (The Complete Statutes of England). Butterworth & Co (Publishers) Ltd. 1946. Volume 38: 1945: . Page 24.
- Halsbury's Statutes of England. Second Edition. 1950. Volume 16. Pages 548 et seq. See also pages 367, 511 and 551.
- Halsbury's Statutes of England. Third Edition. Butterworths. 1970. Volume 22. Page 886. See also page 878.
- The Scots Law Times: Statutes: 1945-46. Page 70. Google
- Hans Aufricht. "The Bretton Woods Agreements Act, 1945". Central Banking Legislation. 1961. Page 227. Google
- The Statutes: Third Revised Edition. 1950. Volume 27. Page 523.
- Halsbury's Laws of England. Fourth Edition. Butterworths. London. 1977. Volume 18. Paragraphs 1837 and 1838 at pages 953 and 954.
- Halsbury's Laws of England. (The Laws of England). Third Edition. 1952. Volume 27. Pages 79, 105 and 106.
- Chitty on Contracts. 31st Edition. Volume 1. Page 1231.
- "Bretton Woods again" (1977) 127 The Banker 186
- (1977) Lloyd's Maritime and Commercial Law Quarterly 310
- "Exchange Control" in "Conflict of Laws" (1978) 127 The New Law Journal 591 (16 June 1977)
- Sharif v Azad [1967] 1 QB 605; (1966) 9 British International Law Cases 103
- The Weekly Notes, 21 February 1948, p 69
