= Public Works Loans Act 1817 =

Act of the Parliament of the United Kingdom

- Act of Parliament
- Parliament of the United Kingdom
- Long title: An Act to authorize the Issue of Exchequer Bills, and the Advance of Money out of the Consolidated Fund, to a limited Amount, for the carrying on of Public Works and Fisheries in the United Kingdom, and Employment of the Poor in Great Britain, in manner therein mentioned.
- Citation: 57 Geo. 3. c. 34
- Territorial extent: United Kingdom

Dates
- Royal assent: 16 June 1817
- Commencement: 16 June 1817 (Note: The Acts of Parliament (Commencement) Act 1793.)
- Repealed: 1 April 1876
Other legislation
Amended by	Public Works Loans (No. 2) Act 1817; Public Works Loans Act 1820; Public Works Loans Act 1822; Public Works Loans Act 1824; Public Works Loans (No. 2) Act 1824; Statute Law Revision Act 1873
Repealed by	Public Works Loans Act 1875

Status: Repealed

Text of statute as originally enacted

Public Works Loans (No. 2) Act 1817
- Act of Parliament
- Parliament of the United Kingdom
- Long title: An Act to amend an Act made in the present Session of Parliament, for authorizing the Issue of Exchequer Bills, and the Advance of Money for carrying on Public Works and Fisheries, and Employment of the Poor.
- Citation: 57 Geo. 3. c. 124
- Territorial extent: United Kingdom

Dates
- Royal assent: 11 July 1817
- Commencement: 11 July 1817
- Repealed: 1 April 1876
Other legislation
Amends	Public Works Loans Act 1817
Amended by	Public Works Loans Act 1820; Public Works Loans Act 1822; Public Works Loans Act 1824; Public Works Loans (No. 2) Act 1824
Repealed by	Public Works Loans Act 1875

Status: Repealed

Text of statute as originally enacted

The Public Works Loans Act 1817 (57 Geo. 3. c. 34), also known as the Poor Employment Act 1817, was an act of the Parliament of the United Kingdom.

The act was passed in order "to authorise the issue of Exchequer Bills and the Advance of Money out of the Consolidated Fund, to a limited Amount, for the carrying on of Public Works and Fisheries in the United Kingdom and Employment of the Poor in Great Britain".

Under the act, the Exchequer Bill Loan Commission was set up to help finance public works projects that would generate employment.

== Subsequent developments ==
The whole act was repealed by section 57 of, and the third schedule to, the Public Works Loans Act 1875 (38 & 39 Vict. c. 55), which came into force on 1 April 1876.

== See also ==
- Exchequer Bill Loan Commission
