= Public Works Loans Act 1964 =

Act of the Parliament of the United Kingdom

Public Works Loans Act 1964 (Note: Section 9(1).)
- Act of Parliament
- Parliament of the United Kingdom
- Long title: An Act to make further provision with respect to loans out of the Local Loans Fund, with respect to temporary borrowing by local authorities in Scotland and with respect to the re-borrowing powers of public authorities; to authorise an increase in the loans which may be made to the Government of Northern Ireland; and for connected purposes.
- Citation: 1964 c. 9
- Territorial extent: United Kingdom (Note: Section 9(3), as originally enacted (now repealed), listed the only provisions of the act that extended to Northern Ireland.)

Dates
- Royal assent: 27 February 1964
- Commencement: 27 February 1964 (Note: The Acts of Parliament (Commencement) Act 1793.)
Other legislation
| Amends | See § Repealed enactments |
| Repeals/revokes | See § Repealed enactments |
| Amended by | Finance Act 1965; National Loans Act 1968; Finance Act 1970; Local Government (Scotland) Act 1975; Statute Law (Repeals) Act 1976; Local Government and Housing Act 1989; Local Government etc. (Scotland) Act 1994 |

Status: Partially repealed

Text of statute as originally enacted

Revised text of statute as amended

Text of the Public Works Loans Act 1964 as in force today (including any amendments) within the United Kingdom, from legislation.gov.uk.

The Public Works Loans Act 1964 (c. 9) is an act of the Parliament of the United Kingdom that made further provision with respect to loans out of the Local Loans Fund administered by the Public Works Loan Commissioners, temporary borrowing by local authorities in Scotland, and the re-borrowing powers of public authorities.

== Provisions ==
=== Repealed enactments ===
Section 9(2) of the act repealed 33 enactments, listed in schedule 3 to the act.

| Citation | Short title | Extent of repeal |
|---|---|---|
| 38 & 39 Vict. c. 89 | Public Works Loans Act 1875 | Section 9 from "and" onwards. |
| 38 & 39 Vict. c. 89 | Public Works Loans Act 1875 | Section 10. |
| 38 & 39 Vict. c. 89 | Public Works Loans Act 1875 | In section 11, the words "by instalments (in the form of an annuity or otherwise)" and the words from "The Loan Commissioners in considering" onwards. |
| 38 & 39 Vict. c. 89 | Public Works Loans Act 1875 | Section 36. |
| 41 & 42 Vict. c. 18 | Public Works Loans Act 1878 | Section 4. |
| 42 & 43 Vict. c. 77 | Public Works Loans Act 1879 | The whole act. |
| 44 & 45 Vict. c. 38 | Public Works Loans Act 1881 | Sections 8 and 9. |
| 45 & 46 Vict. c. 62 | Public Works Loans Act 1882 | Section 8. |
| 55 & 56 Vict. c. 43 | Military Lands Act 1892 | Section 7(2) from "and shall" onwards. |
| 55 & 56 Vict. c. 61 | Public Works Loans Act 1892 | Section 2. |
| 56 & 57 Vict. c. 40 | Public Works Loans (No. 2) Act 1893 | The whole act. |
| 59 & 60 Vict. c. 42 | Public Works Loans Act 1896 | Section 2 from "Provided" onwards. |
| 60 & 61 Vict. c. 51 | Public Works Loans Act 1897 | Sections 1, 11 and 12(1) to (3). |
| 8 Edw. 7. c. 23 | Public Works Loans Act 1908 | Section 6(2) from "and" onwards. |
| 8 Edw. 7. c. 36 | Small Holdings and Allotments Act 1908 | In section 52(2), paragraph (a) of the proviso. |
| 7 & 8 Geo. 5. c. 32 | Public Works Loans Act 1917 | The whole act. |
| 8 & 9 Geo. 5. c. 27 | Public Works Loans Act 1918 | The whole act. |
| 26 Geo. 5 & 1 Edw. 8. c. 5 | Public Works Loans Act 1935 | Section 5(1). |
| 1 & 2 Geo. 6. c. 7 | Public Works Loans (No. 2) Act 1937 | Section 3(1) from "and" onwards. |
| 8 & 9 Geo. 6. c. 18 | Local Authorities Loans Act 1945 | In section 4(1), the words from "authorised" to "a period". |
| 8 & 9 Geo. 6. c. 18 | Local Authorities Loans Act 1945 | Section 6. |
| 9 & 10 Geo. 6. c. 75 | Public Works Loans (No. 2) Act 1946 | In section 2(1), the words "subject to the provisions of this section". |
| 9 & 10 Geo. 6. c. 75 | Public Works Loans (No. 2) Act 1946 | Section 2(2) to (4). |
| 10 & 11 Geo. 6. c. 43 | Local Government (Scotland) Act 1947 | In section 260(1), paragraph (i) of the proviso. |
| 11 & 12 Geo. 6. c. 13 | Public Works Loans Act 1947 | The whole act. |
| 11 & 12 Geo. 6. c. 48 | Public Works Loans Act 1948 | The whole act. |
| 12, 13 & 14 Geo. 6. c. 82 | Public Works Loans Act 1949 | The whole act. |
| 14 Geo. 6. c. 34 | Housing (Scotland) Act 1950 | Section 135. |
| 14 & 15 Geo. 6. c. 5 | Public Works Loans Act 1950 | The whole act. |
| 15 & 16 Geo. 6 & 1 Eliz. 2. c. 5 | Public Works Loans Act 1951 | The whole act. |
| 1 & 2 Eliz. 2. c. 3 | Public Works Loans Act 1952 | The whole act except sections 6 and 7. |
| 2 & 3 Eliz. 2. c. 6 | Public Works Loans Act 1953 | The whole act. |
| 3 & 4 Eliz. 2. c. 9 | Public Works Loans Act 1955 | The whole act. |
| 4 & 5 Eliz. 2. c. 6 | Miscellaneous Financial Provisions Act 1955 | Section 3. |
| 4 & 5 Eliz. 2. c. 65 | Public Works Loans Act 1956 | The whole act. |
| 5 & 6 Eliz. 2. c. 56 | Housing Act 1957 | Section 139. |
| 6 & 7 Eliz. 2. c. 4 | Public Works Loans Act 1957 | The whole act. |
| 6 & 7 Eliz. 2. c. 42 | Housing (Financial Provisions) Act 1958 | Sections 47(7) and 54(4)(a). |

== Subsequent developments ==
Most of the act's substantive provisions have since been repealed. Sections 1 to 5 of, and schedules 1 to 3 to, the act were repealed by the National Loans Act 1968, which reorganised government lending arrangements and transferred funding for local loans to the National Loans Fund. Section 7(1) was repealed by the Finance Act 1965 and section 7(2) by the Finance Act 1970. Section 9(2), which had given effect to the repeals in schedule 3, was repealed by the National Loans Act 1968, and section 9(3), which had defined the act's application to Northern Ireland, was repealed by the Finance Act 1970.

Section 8 of the act was repealed by section 1(1) of, and part XI of schedule 1 to, the Statute Law (Repeals) Act 1976, which came into force on 27 May 1976.

Section 6, concerning the re-borrowing powers of public authorities, remains in force and has been amended on several occasions. Words in section 6(1) were substituted by the Local Government (Scotland) Act 1975 and were further amended, subject to a saving, by the Local Government and Housing Act 1989. The Local Government etc. (Scotland) Act 1994 provides for a new section 6(5), excluding local authorities constituted under that act and joint boards in Scotland from the section's operation, but this amendment is prospective and, as respects Scotland only, had not been applied to the text of the act by the legislation.gov.uk editorial team as of the act's most recent revision. Section 9(1), giving the act its short title, also remains in force.
