= Public Works Loan Board =

Distributed loans to UK public bodies

The Public Works Loan Board (PWLB) (Welsh: Bwrdd Benthyciadau Gwaith Cyhoeddus) was a statutory body of the UK Government that provided loans to public bodies from the National Loans Fund. In 2020, the PWLB was abolished as a statutory organisation, and its functions were allocated to HM Treasury, where they are discharged through the UK Debt Management Office. The members of the PWLB were known as the Public Works Loan Commissioners.

== History ==
=== Exchequer Loan and Bill Commissioners ===
Public Works Loan Act 1853 (Note: Section 5.)
- Act of Parliament
- Parliament of the United Kingdom
- Long title: An Act for altering the Mode of Repayment of Advances by the Public Works Loan Commissioners under the Public Health Act, 1848, and other Acts.
- Citation: 16 & 17 Vict. c. 40
- Territorial extent: United Kingdom

Dates
- Royal assent: 8 July 1853
- Commencement: 8 July 1853 (Note: The Acts of Parliament (Commencement) Act 1793.)
- Repealed: 1 April 1876
Other legislation
Repealed by	Public Works Loans Act 1875

Status: Repealed

Text of statute as originally enacted

Originally known as Exchequer Loan Commissioners, the Public Works Loan Commissioners were first appointed as an ad-hoc body in 1793 to alleviate commercial distress resulting from the trade recession which followed the French Revolutionary Wars.

In 1817 another single purpose body of commissioners, known as Exchequer Bill Commissioners, were appointed to provide relief following the Napoleonic Wars. They were to receive "no fee, reward or emolument or gratuity whatever" and their task was to consider applications in respect of any works of a public nature which might aid employment. In subsequent years, instead of appointing further bodies of commissioners, Parliament prescribed additional purposes for lending for the existing Exchequer Bill Commissioners thus creating the continuous office of the commissioners which survived until 2020. Over the subsequent 50 years a considerable number of public projects were financed by loans advanced by the Exchequer Bill Commissioners, including, in 1826, £400,000 for improvements to Charing Cross and the Strand which involved the formation of Trafalgar Square. In 1832, £250,000 was used for the construction of the Rotherhithe Tunnel under the River Thames and, in 1846, £200,000 for the establishment of Battersea Park.

=== Public Works Loan Commissioners ===
Public Works Loans Act 1880 (Note: Section 1.)
- Act of Parliament
- Parliament of the United Kingdom
- Long title: An Act to appoint Public Works Loan Commissioners; to grant Money for the purpose of Loans by the Public Works Loan Commissioners and the Commissioners of Public Works in Ireland; and for other purposes relating to Loans by those Commissioners.
- Citation: 43 & 44 Vict. c. 1
- Territorial extent: United Kingdom

Dates
- Royal assent: 14 June 1880
- Commencement: 14 June 1880
- Repealed: 25 July 1898
Other legislation
Repealed by	Statute Law Revision Act 1898

Status: Repealed

Text of statute as originally enacted

Public Works Loans Act 1881
- Act of Parliament
- Parliament of the United Kingdom
- Long title: An Act to grant Money for the purpose of Loans by the Public Works Loan Commissioners and the Commissioners of Public Works in Ireland; and for other purposes relating to Loans by those Commissioners.
- Citation: 44 & 45 Vict. c. 38
- Territorial extent: United Kingdom

Dates
- Royal assent: 22 August 1881
- Commencement: 22 August 1881
- Repealed: 16 November 1989
Other legislation
Amends	Public Loans Act 1875
Amended by	Statute Law Revision Act 1898; Housing Act 1925; Housing (Scotland) Act 1925; Public Works Loans Act 1964; National Loans Act 1968
Repealed by	Statute Law (Repeals) Act 1989

Status: Repealed

Text of statute as originally enacted

Public Works Loans Act 1882
- Act of Parliament
- Parliament of the United Kingdom
- Long title: An Act to grant Money for the purpose of Loans by the Public Works Loan Commissioners and the Commissioners of Public Works in Ireland and the Irish Land Commission; and for other purposes relating to Loans by those Commissioners.
- Citation: 45 & 46 Vict. c. 62
- Territorial extent: United Kingdom

Dates
- Royal assent: 18 August 1882
- Commencement: Public Works Loans Act 1880
- Repealed: 22 July 2004
Other legislation
Amends	General Pier and Harbour Act 1861]; Public Works Loans Act 1875; Public Works Loans (Ireland) Act 1877; Land Law (Ireland) Act 1881
Amended by	Statute Law Revision Act 1898; Statute Law Revision Act 1950; Public Works Etc., Loans Act (Northern Ireland) 1953; Statute Law Revision Act 1963; Public Works Loans Act 1964
Repealed by	Statute Law (Repeals) Act 2004

Status: Repealed

Text of statute as originally enacted

Revised text of statute as amended

Text of the Public Works Loans Act 1882 as in force today (including any amendments) within the United Kingdom, from legislation.gov.uk.

Public Works Loans Act 1883
- Act of Parliament
- Parliament of the United Kingdom
- Long title: An Act to grant Money for the purpose of Loans by the Public Works Loan Commissioners and the Commissioners of Public Works in Ireland and the Irish Land Commission; and to amend the Acts relating to the said Commissioners, and for other purposes.
- Citation: 46 & 47 Vict. c. 42
- Territorial extent: United Kingdom

Dates
- Royal assent: 25 August 1883
- Commencement: 25 August 1883
- Repealed: 21 December 1954
Other legislation
Amends	Public Works Loans (Ireland) Act 1877
Amended by	Statute Law Revision Act 1898
Repealed by	Statute Law Revision Act 1898; Public Works, etc., Loans Act (Northern Ireland) 1953; Statute Law Revision Act (Northern Ireland) 1954

Status: Repealed

Text of statute as originally enacted

Public Works Loans Act 1887
- Act of Parliament
- Parliament of the United Kingdom
- Long title: An Act to grant money for the purpose of certain Local Loans; and for other purposes relating to Local Loans.
- Citation: 50 & 51 Vict. c. 37
- Territorial extent: United Kingdom

Dates
- Royal assent: 16 September 1887
- Commencement: 16 September 1887
- Repealed: 22 July 2004
Other legislation
Amended by	Merchant Shipping (Mercantile Marine Fund) Act 1898; Statute Law Revision Act 1908; Public Works Etc. Loans Act (Northern Ireland) 1953; Interpretation Act 1978
Repealed by	Statute Law (Repeals) Act 2004

Status: Repealed

Text of statute as originally enacted

Revised text of statute as amended

Text of the Public Works Loans Act 1887 as in force today (including any amendments) within the United Kingdom, from legislation.gov.uk.

Public Works Loans Act 1900
- Act of Parliament
- Parliament of the United Kingdom
- Long title: An Act to grant Money for the purpose of certain Local Loans out of the Local Loans Fund, and for other purposes relating to Local Loans.
- Citation: 63 & 64 Vict. c. 36
- Territorial extent: United Kingdom

Dates
- Royal assent: 6 August 1900
- Commencement: 6 August 1900
Other legislation
Amended by	Statute Law Revision Act 1908

Status: Partially repealed

Text of statute as originally enacted

Public Works Loans Act 1909 (Note: Section 4.)
- Act of Parliament
- Parliament of the United Kingdom
- Long title: An Act to grant Money for the purpose of certain Local Loans out of the Local Loans Fund, and for other purposes relating to Local Loans.
- Citation: 9 Edw. 7. c. 6
- Territorial extent: United Kingdom

Dates
- Royal assent: 16 August 1909
- Commencement: 16 August 1909
- Repealed: 22 December 1927
Other legislation
Repealed by	Statute Law Revision Act 1927

Status: Repealed

Text of statute as originally enacted

Public Works Loans Act 1911
- Act of Parliament
- Parliament of the United Kingdom
- Long title: An Act to grant Money for the purpose of certain Local Loans out of the Local Loans Fund, and for other purposes relating to Local Loans.
- Citation: 1 & 2 Geo. 5. c. 17
- Territorial extent: United Kingdom

Dates
- Royal assent: 18 August 1911
- Commencement: 18 August 1911
- Repealed: Northern Ireland:
Other legislation
Amends	Public Works Loans Act 1875
Amended by	Statute Law Revision Act 1927
Repealed by	Northern Ireland: Statute Law Revision Act 1927 and Public Works &c Loans Act (Northern Ireland) 1953

Status: Partially repealed

Text of statute as originally enacted

Revised text of statute as amended

Text of the Public Works Loans Act 1911 as in force today (including any amendments) within the United Kingdom, from legislation.gov.uk.

Public Works Loans Act 1919
- Act of Parliament
- Parliament of the United Kingdom
- Long title: An Act to grant Money for the purpose of certain Local Loans out of the Local Loans Fund, and for other purposes relating to Local Loans.
- Citation: 9 & 10 Geo. 5. c. 52
- Territorial extent: United Kingdom

Dates
- Royal assent: 19 August 1919
- Commencement: 19 August 1919
- Repealed: 22 December 1927
Other legislation
Repealed by	Statute Law Revision Act 1927

Status: Repealed

Text of statute as originally enacted

Public Works Loans Act 1941 (Note: Section 6.)
- Act of Parliament
- Parliament of the United Kingdom
- Long title: An Act to grant money for the purpose of certain local loans out of the Local Loans Fund, and for other purposes relating to local loans.
- Citation: 4 & 5 Geo. 6. c. 14
- Territorial extent: United Kingdom

Dates
- Royal assent: 10 April 1941
- Commencement: 10 April 1941
- Repealed: 1 April 1968
Other legislation
Repealed by	National Loans Act 1968

Status: Repealed

Text of statute as originally enacted

The next major landmark was the Public Works Loans Act 1875 (38 & 39 Vict. c. 89) which created the Public Works Loan Commissioners and replaced the Exchequer Bill Commissioners. The purpose of the Public Works Loan Commissioners was different from that of the Exchequer Bills Commission and the Exchequer Loan Commissioners as it was not focused on relieving commercial distress, but rather on providing funding to specific bodies for certain categories of expenditure. The act, together with the National Loans Act 1968, became the prime statutory basis for the constitution, duties and operations of the Public Works Loan Commissioners. The act introduced a requirement that the Public Works Loan Commissioners make an annual report to Parliament.

=== Subsequent developments ===
In 1887 the method of funding lending by the Public Works Loan Commissioners was changed as it had become increasingly difficult to estimate the amount of loan applications. A Local Loans Fund was created pursuant to the National Debt and Local Loans Stock Act 1887, which was financed by the issue of Local Loans Stock, borrowings on the security of bonds, temporary borrowing and repayments of loans made. Pursuant to the terms of the Public Works Loans Act 1887 (50 & 51 Vict. c. 37), funds raised under the National Debt and Local Loans Stock Act 1887 were used to fund lending by the Public Works Loan Commissioners. In 1897 the responsibility for fixing the interest rates provided by the Public Works Loan Commissioners became vested in the Treasury, as is still the case today.

By the end of the First World War the foundations of the present local government structure were firmly in place and substantial funding was required for extensive development programmes of local authorities, particularly for housing and town planning; in 1921-22 nearly £49 million was lent for housing alone. By 1939 total lending by the Public Works Loan Commissioners had reached almost £600 million.

Towards the end of the Second World War, the Treasury issued a memorandum to local authorities which referred to the heavy demands on the money market that would be made after the end of the hostilities. It was proposed that local authorities should borrow for their capital development programmes through the government who would themselves raise money as part of their general borrowing programme. The rates of interest on loans to local authorities would be determined by the government’s own credit and the advances would be made by the Public Works Loan Commissioners.

=== Post-World War II ===
Public Works Loans Act 1944
- Act of Parliament
- Parliament of the United Kingdom
- Long title: An Act to grant money for the purpose of certain local loans out of the Local Loans Fund and for other purposes relating to local loans, and to enable the functions of the secretary of the Public Works Loan Commissioners to be performed, in the event of his inability to act, by an assistant secretary.
- Citation: 7 & 8 Geo. 6. c. 16
- Territorial extent: United Kingdom

Dates
- Royal assent: 21 March 1944
- Commencement: 21 March 1944
Other legislation
Amended by	Statute Law Revision Act 1950; Public Bodies (Abolition of Public Works Loan Commissioners) Order 2020

Status: Partially repealed

Text of statute as originally enacted

Revised text of statute as amended

Text of the Public Works Loans Act 1944 as in force today (including any amendments) within the United Kingdom, from legislation.gov.uk.

Public Works Loans Act 1946 (Note: Section 5(1).)
- Act of Parliament
- Parliament of the United Kingdom
- Long title: An Act to make further provision as to the appointment of the Public Works Loan Commissioners, to grant money for the purpose of certain local loans out of the Local Loans Fund and for other purposes relating to local loans.
- Citation: 9 & 10 Geo. 6. c. 41
- Territorial extent: United Kingdom

Dates
- Royal assent: 26 March 1946
- Commencement: 26 March 1946
- Repealed: 25 February 2020
Other legislation
Amends	Public Works Loans Act 1875
Amended by	Statute Law Revision Act 1950; Statute Law Revision Act 1963; Public Works Loans Act 1964
Repealed by	Public Bodies (Abolition of Public Works Loan Commissioners) Order 2020

Status: Repealed

Text of statute as originally enacted

Revised text of statute as amended

Text of the Public Works Loans Act 1946 as in force today (including any amendments) within the United Kingdom, from legislation.gov.uk.

Public Works Loans (No. 2) Act 1946
- Act of Parliament
- Parliament of the United Kingdom
- Long title: An Act to grant money for the purpose of certain local loans out of the Local Loans Fund; to make provision as to the Public Works Loan Commissioners' entering into undertakings to grant loans; and to repeal the provisions of section ninety-two of the Housing Act, 1936, and of section seventy-three of the Housing (Scotland) Act, 1925, as to the minimum rate of interest therein mentioned.
- Citation: 9 & 10 Geo. 6. c. 75
- Territorial extent: United Kingdom

Dates
- Royal assent: 6 November 1946
- Commencement: 6 November 1946
- Repealed: 1 April 1968
Other legislation
Amends	Housing (Scotland) Act 1925; Housing Act 1936
Repealed by	National Loans Act 1968

Status: Repealed

Text of statute as originally enacted

Public Works Loans Act 1947
- Act of Parliament
- Parliament of the United Kingdom
- Long title: An Act to grant money for the purpose of certain local loans out of the Local Loans Fund and for other purposes relating to local loans.
- Citation: 11 & 12 Geo. 6. c. 13
- Territorial extent: United Kingdom

Dates
- Royal assent: 18 December 1947
- Commencement: 18 December 1947
- Repealed: 27 February 1964
Other legislation
Repealed by	Public Works Loans Act 1964

Status: Repealed

Text of statute as originally enacted

Public Works Loans Act 1948 (Note: Section 3.)
- Act of Parliament
- Parliament of the United Kingdom
- Long title: An Act to grant money for the purpose of certain local loans out of the Local Loans Fund, and for other purposes relating to local loans.
- Citation: 11 & 12 Geo. 6. c. 48
- Territorial extent: United Kingdom

Dates
- Royal assent: 13 July 1948
- Commencement: 13 July 1948
- Repealed: 27 February 1964
Other legislation
Repealed by	Public Works Loans Act 1964

Status: Repealed

Text of statute as originally enacted

Public Works Loans Act 1949
- Act of Parliament
- Parliament of the United Kingdom
- Long title: An Act to grant money for the purpose of certain local loans out of the Local Loans Fund, and for other purposes relating to local loans.
- Citation: 12, 13 & 14 Geo. 6. c. 82
- Territorial extent: United Kingdom

Dates
- Royal assent: 16 December 1949
- Commencement: 16 December 1949
- Repealed: 27 February 1964
Other legislation
Repealed by	Public Works Loans Act 1964

Status: Repealed

Text of statute as originally enacted

Public Works Loans Act 1950
- Act of Parliament
- Parliament of the United Kingdom
- Long title: An Act to grant money for the purpose of certain local loans out of the Local Loans Fund, and for other purposes relating to local loans.
- Citation: 14 & 15 Geo. 6. c. 5
- Territorial extent: United Kingdom

Dates
- Royal assent: 15 December 1950
- Commencement: 15 December 1950
- Repealed: 27 February 1964
Other legislation
Repealed by	Public Works Loans Act 1964

Status: Repealed

Text of statute as originally enacted

Public Works Loans Act 1952 (Note: Section 7.)
- Act of Parliament
- Parliament of the United Kingdom
- Long title: An Act to grant money for the purpose of certain local loans out of the Local Loans Fund, and for other purposes relating to local loans.
- Citation: 1 & 2 Eliz. 2. c. 3
- Territorial extent: United Kingdom

Dates
- Royal assent: 16 December 1952
- Commencement: 16 December 1952
Other legislation
Amended by	Public Works Loans Act 1964; Northern Ireland Act 1998

Status: Partially repealed

Text of statute as originally enacted

Revised text of statute as amended

Text of the Public Works Loans Act 1952 as in force today (including any amendments) within the United Kingdom, from legislation.gov.uk.

Public Works Loans Act 1965 (Note: Section 4(1).)
- Act of Parliament
- Parliament of the United Kingdom
- Long title: An Act to make further provision with respect to loans out of the Local Loans Fund; and for connected purposes.
- Citation: 1965 c. 63
- Territorial extent: England and Wales; Scotland; (Note: Section 4(4).)

Dates
- Royal assent: 5 August 1965
- Commencement: 5 August 1965 (section 1); 5 October 1965 (rest of act); (Note: Section 4(3).)
Other legislation
Amended by	Finance Act 1967; Public Works Loans Act 1967; National Loans Act 1968; Local Government (Scotland) Act 1975; Land Drainage Act 1976; Abolition of Domestic Rates Etc. (Scotland) Act 1987; Local Government and Housing Act 1989; Local Government Finance (Repeals, Savings and Consequential Amendments) Order 1990; Water Consolidation (Consequential Provisions) Act 1991; Access to Justice Act 1999; Greater London Authority Act 1999; Local Government Act 2003; Courts Act 2003; Fire and Rescue Services Act 2004; Local Authorities (Capital Finance) (Consequential, Transitional and Saving Provisions) Order 2004; Public Bodies (Abolition of Public Works Loan Commissioners) Order 2020

Status: Amended

Text of statute as originally enacted

Revised text of statute as amended

Text of the Public Works Loans Act 1965 as in force today (including any amendments) within the United Kingdom, from legislation.gov.uk.

Public Works Loans Act 1966
- Act of Parliament
- Parliament of the United Kingdom
- Long title: An Act to grant money for the purpose of certain local loans out of the Local Loans Fund.
- Citation: 1966 c. 16
- Territorial extent: United Kingdom

Dates
- Royal assent: 26 May 1966
- Commencement: 26 May 1966
- Repealed: 1 April 1968
Other legislation
Repealed by	National Loans Act 1968

Status: Repealed

Public Works Loans Act 1967 (Note: Section 3(1).)
- Act of Parliament
- Parliament of the United Kingdom
- Long title: An Act to make further provision with respect to loans out of the Local Loans Fund.
- Citation: 1967 c. 61
- Territorial extent: England and Wales; Scotland; (Note: Section 3(2).)

Dates
- Royal assent: 27 July 1967
- Commencement: 27 July 1967
Other legislation
Amends	Public Works Loans Act 1965
Amended by	National Loans Act 1968; Interpretation Act 1978; Local Government and Housing Act 1989; Local Government Act 2003; Local Authorities (Capital Finance) (Consequential, Transitional and Saving Provisions) Order 2004

Status: Amended

Text of statute as originally enacted

Revised text of statute as amended

Text of the Public Works Loans Act 1967 as in force today (including any amendments) within the United Kingdom, from legislation.gov.uk.

In 1963, a government white paper, noting the increased reliance of local authorities on temporary borrowing, proposed greater access to funding from the Public Works Loan Commissioners in return for a limitation on temporary debt under a quota system.

The National Loans Act 1968 re-organised the accounting arrangements and, since then, monies for local loans are provided by section 3 of the National Loans Act 1968 and drawn from the National Loans Fund (NLF). Certain obsolete or duplicated lending powers of the Public Works Loan Commissioners were repealed in the 1968 act and the remainder consolidated. The Treasury’s power to fix the interest rates on loans made by the Public Works Loan Commissioners was re-enacted in terms corresponding with those prescribed for other loans made out of the NLF.

In 1982 the government, in support of its monetary policy, set out to reduce the dependence of local authorities on bank borrowing. The Public Works Loan Commissioners were asked to take steps to increase their share of lending and in a short time they revamped their lending facilities from being a provider of solely longer-term fixed rate funding which took up to ten days to advance to a wide range which included variable rate loans and one-year minimum periods.

Whilst the scope of the Public Works Loan Commissioners, and the source of funding, changed over time, ultimately the Commissioners were still responsible for assessing whether to lend money and to assess such matters as the level of security that should be required. In 2000 the government issued a green paper which suggested replacing the then-existing credit approval system for controlling capital expenditure with a prudential regime to determine affordability. This Green Paper was followed by a White Paper in 2001, which proposed a new prudential capital finance system. The framework for this proposal was introduced in the Local Government Act 2003. The framework provided by the Local Government Act 2003 was supplemented and developed through the Prudential Code, which was published by Chartered Institute of Public Finance and Accountancy (CIFPA). This formed the governance framework for the PWLB lending from 2004.

Since July 2002 it has been managed as part of the UK Debt Management Office, one of HM Treasury's executive agencies. In 2004, the decisions around borrowing requirements and how local authorities use PWLB funds were devolved to local authorities. Local authorities must comply with the Prudential Framework, which comprises the legislation and statutory codes that govern local authority borrowing and investment. There are four statutory codes, which authorities must have regard to, including the CIPFA-produced Prudential Code and the Ministry of Housing, Communities and Local Government to ensure they are borrowing prudently. Following this reform, the role of Commissioners was merely ceremonial and existed so that government lending complied with the statute. Lending was managed within a policy framework set by HM Treasury and loans were processed through the DMO.

Subsequently, new governance arrangements were proposed in a consultation led by HM Treasury in 2016 and the Public Works Loan Commissioner role was formally abolished on 25 February 2020. Their statutory functions, roles and responsibilities transferred to HM Treasury. Day-to-day administration of PWLB loans continues via the DMO on HM Treasury’s behalf.

== Operations ==
The PWLB provides loans to local authorities of all types in Great Britain, primarily for capital projects.

=== Eligible bodies ===
- English and Welsh county councils
- English district councils (including unitary authorities)
- Welsh county borough councils
- London borough councils
- the City of London Corporation
- the Greater London Authority and its functional bodies
- the councils of local government areas in Scotland
- parish and community councils
- the Council of the Isles of Scilly
- the Broads Authority
- integrated transport authorities and passenger transport executives
- police authorities
- fire and rescue authorities
- waste disposal authorities
- port health authorities
- other authorities in England, Wales or Scotland having power to levy council tax or to issue a precept or levy

== See also ==
- Exchequer Bill Loan Commission
- Local Government Funding Agency
