= Public Works Loans Act 1875 =

Act of the Parliament of the United Kingdom

Public Works Loans Act 1875 (Note: Section 1.)
- Act of Parliament
- Parliament of the United Kingdom
- Long title: An Act to consolidate with Amendments the Acts relating to Loans for Public Works.
- Citation: 38 & 39 Vict. c. 89
- Territorial extent: United Kingdom; Isle of Man; (Note: Section 3, later repealed by the National Loans Act 1968.)

Dates
- Royal assent: 13 August 1875
- Commencement: 1 April 1876 (Note: Section 2.)

Other legislation
- Amends: See § Repealed enactments
- Repeals/revokes: See § Repealed enactments
- Amended by: Public Works Loans Act 1878; Public Works Loans Act 1881; Municipal Corporations Act 1882; Public Works Loans Act 1882; Statute Law Revision Act 1883; National Debt and Local Loans Act 1887; Statute Law Revision (No. 2) Act 1893; Statute Law Revision Act 1898; Perjury Act 1911; Public Works Loans Act 1911; Supreme Court of Judicature (Consolidation) Act 1925; False Oaths (Scotland) Act 1933; Public Works Loans Act 1946; Crown Proceedings Act 1947; Statute Law Revision Act 1963; Public Works Loans Act 1964; National Loans Act 1968; Statute Law Revision Act 1968; Theft Act 1968; Courts Act 1971; Statute Law (Repeals) Act 1986; Statute Law (Repeals) Act 2004; Public Bodies (Abolition of Public Works Loan Commissioners) Order 2020
- Relates to: Public Works Loans Act 1879; Public Works Loans Act 1884; Public Works Loans Act 1885

Status: Partially repealed

Text of statute as originally enacted

Revised text of statute as amended

Text of the Public Works Loans Act 1875 as in force today (including any amendments) within the United Kingdom, from legislation.gov.uk.

The Public Works Loans Act 1875 (38 & 39 Vict. c. 89) is an act of the Parliament of the United Kingdom that consolidated enactments relating to loans for public works in the United Kingdom. The act created the Public Works Loan Commissioners, who replaced the earlier Exchequer Bill Commissioners, and it remains, together with the National Loans Act 1968, one of the principal statutory sources for government lending to local authorities.

== Provisions ==
=== Repealed enactments ===
Section 57 of the act repealed 27 enactments, listed in the third schedule to the act.

Citation	Short title	Description	Extent of repeal
57 Geo. 3. c. 34	Public Works Loans Act 1817	An Act to authorise the issue of Exchequer bills and the advance of money out of the Consolidated Fund, to a limited amount, for the carrying on of public works and fisheries in the United Kingdom and employment of the poor in Great Britain in manner therein mentioned.	The whole act.
57 Geo. 3. c. 124	Public Works Loans (No. 2) Act 1817	An Act to amend an Act made in the present session of Parliament authorising the issue of Exchequer bills and the advance of money for carrying on public works and fisheries and employment of the poor.	The whole act.
1 Geo. 4. c. 60	Public Works Loans Act 1820	An Act the title of which begins with the words,—An Act to authorise,—and ends with the words,—executing the said Acts in Great Britain.	The whole act.
3 Geo. 4. c. 86	Public Works Loans Act 1822	An Act the title of which begins with the words,—An Act to amend two Acts,—and ends with the words,—purposes of the said Acts.	The whole act.
5 Geo. 4. c. 36	Public Works Loans Act 1824	An Act to amend and render more effectual the several Acts for the issuing of Exchequer bills for public works.	The whole act.
5 Geo. 4. c. 77	Public Works Loans (No. 2) Act 1824	An Act to amend the Acts for the issue of Exchequer bills for public works.	The whole act.
6 Geo. 4. c. 35	Public Works Loans Act 1825	An Act to render more effectual the several Acts for authorising advances for carrying on public works, so far as relates to Ireland.	The whole act.
7 & 8 Geo. 4. c. 47	Advances for Public Works Act 1827	An Act for the further amendment and extension of the powers of the several Acts authorising advances for carrying on public works.	The whole act.
1 & 2 Will. 4. c. 24	Advances for Public Works Act 1831	An Act to amend several Acts passed for authorising the issue of Exchequer bills and the advances of money for carrying on public works and fisheries and employment of the poor, and to authorise a further issue of Exchequer bills for the purposes of the said Acts.	The whole act.
3 & 4 Will. 4. c. 32	Loans for Public Works Act 1833	An Act to amend the several Acts authorising advances for carrying on public works.	The whole act.
4 & 5 Will. 4. c. 72	Advances for Public Works Act 1834	An Act to amend several Acts for authorising the issue of Exchequer bills for carrying on public works and fisheries and employment of the poor, and to authorise a further issue of Exchequer bills for the purposes of the said Acts.	The whole act.
7 Will. 4 & 1 Vict. c. 51	Advances for Public Works Act 1837	An Act to authorise a further issue of Exchequer bills for public works and fisheries and employment of the poor, and to amend the Acts relating thereto.	The whole act.
1 & 2 Vict. c. 88	Advances for Public Works Act 1838	An Act to authorise a further issue of Exchequer bills for public works and fisheries and employment of the poor, and to amend the Acts relating thereto.	The whole act.
3 & 4 Vict. c. 10	Advances for Public Works Act 1840	An Act to authorise the issue of Exchequer bills for public works and fisheries and employment of the poor.	The whole act.
5 & 6 Vict. c. 9	Advances for Public Works Act 1842	An Act to authorise the advance of money out of the Consolidated Fund, to a limited amount, for carrying on public works and fisheries and employment of the poor; and to amend the Acts authorising the issue of Exchequer bills for the like purposes.	The whole act.
9 & 10 Vict. c. 80	Public Works Loans Act 1846	An Act to authorise the advance of money out of the Consolidated Fund for carrying on public works and fisheries and employment of the poor.	The whole act.
9 & 10 Vict. c. 83	Public Works Loans (No. 2) Act 1846	An Act to empower the Commissioners for the Issue of Loans for Public Works and Fisheries to make loans in money to the Commissioners of Her Majesty's Woods in lieu of loans heretofore authorised to be made in Exchequer bills.	The whole act.
12 & 13 Vict. c. 86	Workhouses (Ireland) Act 1849	An Act to provide additional funds for loans by the Public Works Loan Commissioners for building workhouses in Ireland.	The whole act.
14 & 15 Vict. c. 23	Public Works Loans Act 1851	An Act to authorise for a further period the advance of money out of the Consolidated Fund, to a limited amount, for carrying on public works and fisheries and employment of the poor.	The whole act.
16 & 17 Vict. c. 40	Public Works Loan Act 1853	N/A	The whole act.
19 & 20 Vict. c. 17	Public Works Act 1856	An Act to authorise for a further period the advance of money out of the Consolidated Fund for carrying on public works and fisheries and for the employment of the poor.	The whole act.
24 & 25 Vict. c. 80	Advances for Public Works Act 1861	An Act the title of which begins with the words,—An Act to authorise,—and ends with the words,—and for other purposes.	The whole act.
25 & 26 Vict. c. 30	Advances for Public Works Act 1862	An Act the title of which begins with the words,—An Act to amend an Act,—and ends with the words,—and for other purposes.	The whole act.
29 & 30 Vict. c. 72	Public Works Loans Act 1866	An Act the title of which begins with the words,—An Act to authorise advances of money,—and ends with the words,—Labouring Classes Dwellings Act, 1866.	The whole act.
30 & 31 Vict. c. 32	Public Works Loans Act 1867	An Act the title of which begins with the words,—An Act to authorise,—and ends with the words,—advances for public works.	The whole act.
35 & 36 Vict. c. 71	Public Works Loan Commissioners Act 1872	N/A	The whole act.
36 & 37 Vict. c. 49	Public Works Loan Act 1872	An Act to authorise advances to the Public Works Loan Commissioners for enabling them to make loans to school boards, in pursuance of the Elementary Education Act, 1870, and to sanitary authorities, in pursuance of the Public Health Act, 1872.	The whole act.

== Subsequent developments ==
Section 13 was repealed by section 9 of the Public Works Loans Act 1882. Sections 42, 52 and 54 were repealed by the Statute Law Revision Act 1883. Sections 14, 16 and 17 were repealed by schedule 3 to the National Debt and Local Loans Act 1887. Section 2, part of the definitions in section 51, section 53, and the third schedule were repealed by the Statute Law Revision (No. 2) Act 1893. Section 11 was amended by section 4 of the Public Works Loans Act 1911. Words in section 28 were substituted by virtue of sections 56(1)(a) and 224(1) of the Supreme Court of Judicature (Consolidation) Act 1925. Further words in section 9 were repealed by schedule 2 to the Public Works Loans Act 1946. Section 5(1), and words in section 7, were repealed by schedule 2 to the Crown Proceedings Act 1947.

Section 15 of the act was repealed by section 1 of, and the schedule to, the Statute Law Revision Act 1963, which came into force on 31 July 1963.

Sections 10 and 36 of the act were repealed, and further words in sections 9 and 11 were repealed, by schedule 3 to the Public Works Loans Act 1964. Sections 3, 40, 49 and 56, and the first schedule, together with further words in sections 5 and 9, were repealed by schedule 6 part II to the National Loans Act 1968. Section 15 was repealed by the Statute Law Revision Act 1968. Section 44 was repealed by schedule 3 part I to the Theft Act 1968. Further words in section 33 were repealed by schedule 11 part IV to the Courts Act 1971. Further words in section 41 were repealed by the Statute Law (Repeals) Act 1986. Further words in section 33, and the proviso to section 57, were repealed by the Statute Law (Repeals) Act 2004.

Following the abolition of the Public Works Loan Commissioners on 25 February 2020, the Public Bodies (Abolition of Public Works Loan Commissioners) Order 2020 substituted references to the Treasury for references to the Loan Commissioners and the Public Works Loans Secretary throughout the act, and omitted section 4, the second schedule, and other spent provisions relating to the former commissioners and their staff.
