= National Loans Act 1968 =

Act of the Parliament of the United Kingdom

National Loans Act 1968 (Note: Section 24(1).)
- Act of Parliament
- Parliament of the United Kingdom
- Long title: An Act to establish a National Loans Fund, to substitute the National Loans Fund for the Consolidated Fund in certain enactments, including enactments relating to Government lending and advances, the Exchange Equalisation Account and government annuities, to make profits of the Issue Department of the Bank of England payable into the National Loans Fund and to make other provision as to the said Department, to charge the whole of the national debt on the National Loans Fund, and to amend the law about Government borrowing; to make further provision for loans by the Public Works Loan Commissioners, and to authorise advances out of the National Loans Fund for the purpose of such loans; to transfer to Votes certain payments charged on the Consolidated Fund; and generally to make provision for the management of the Government's financial business.
- Citation: 1968 c. 13
- Territorial extent: United Kingdom (Note: Section 23.)

Dates
- Royal assent: 13 March 1968
- Commencement: 1 April 1968 (Note: Section 24(3).)

Other legislation
- Amends: Bank of England Act 1819; Bank of England Act 1861; National Debt Act 1870; Sinking Fund Act 1875; Public Works Loans Act 1875; Treasury Bills Act 1877; Revenue, Friendly Societies and National Debt Act 1882; National Debt (Conversion of Stock) Act 1884; National Debt (Conversion) Act 1888; Interpretation Act 1889; Parliament Act 1911; War Loan Act 1919; Government of Ireland Act 1920; Finance Act 1921; Government Annuities Act 1929; Finance Act 1930; Finance Act 1934; Tithe Act 1936; National Loans Act 1939; Bretton Woods Agreements Act 1945; Bank of England Act 1946; Coal Industry Nationalisation Act 1946; New Towns Act 1946; Gas Act 1948; Armed Forces (Housing Loans) Act 1949; Miscellaneous Financial Provisions Act 1950; Housing (Scotland) Act 1950; Income Tax Act 1952; Town and Country Planning (Scotland) Act 1954; Miscellaneous Financial Provisions Act 1955; Sugar Act 1956; Finance Act 1956; Electricity Act 1957; Housing (Financial Provisions) Act 1958; National Debt Act 1958; Armed Forces (Housing Loans) Act 1958; European Monetary Agreement Act 1959; House Purchase and Housing Act 1959; International Development Association Act 1960; Post Office Act 1961; Finance Act 1961; Covent Garden Market Act 1961; Housing Act 1961; Housing (Scotland) Act 1962; Town and Country Planning Act 1962; Transport Act 1962; Electricity and Gas Act 1963; Shipbuilding Credit Act 1964; Harbours Act 1964; Housing Act 1964; Armed Forces (Housing Loans) Act 1965; Airports Authority Act 1965; New Towns Act 1965; Redundancy Payments Act 1965; Military Aircraft (Loans) Act 1966; Docks and Harbours Act 1966; Industrial Reorganisation Corporation Act 1966; Tees and Hartlepools Port Authority Act 1966; Land Commission Act 1967; Iron and Steel Act 1967; Air Corporations Act 1967; Shipbuilding Industry Act 1967; See § Repealed enactments
- Repeals/revokes: See § Repealed enactments
- Amended by: Town and Country Planning Act 1971; Town and Country Planning (Scotland) Act 1972; Statute Law (Repeals) Act 1973; Statute Law (Repeals) Act 1976; Exchange Equalisation Account Act 1979; British Telecommunications Act 1981; Statute Law (Repeals) Act 1986; Statute Law (Repeals) Act 1993; Coal Industry Act 1994; Police and Magistrates' Courts Act 1994; Finance Act 1996; Housing Act 1996 (Consequential Provisions) Order 1996; Finance Act 1998; Statute Law (Repeals) Act 1998; Finance Act 1999; Access to Justice Act 1999; Greater London Authority Act 1999; Finance Act 2003; Courts Act 2003; Statute Law (Repeals) Act 2004; Fire and Rescue Services Act 2004; Government Stock (Consequential and Transitional Provision) (No. 2) Order 2004; Housing and Regeneration Act 2008; Companies Act 2006 (Consequential Amendments, Transitional Provisions and Savings) Order 2009; Postal Services Act 2011; Finance Act 2014; Finance Act 2020; Public Bodies (Abolition of Public Works Loan Commissioners) Order 2020; Local Government and Elections (Wales) Act 2021 (Corporate Joint Committees) (Consequential Amendments) Order 2023

Status: Partially repealed

Text of statute as originally enacted

Revised text of statute as amended

Text of the National Loans Act 1968 as in force today (including any amendments) within the United Kingdom, from legislation.gov.uk.

The National Loans Act 1968 (c. 13) is an act of the Parliament of the United Kingdom that established the National Loans Fund and consolidated the law relating to government borrowing and lending in the United Kingdom.

== Provisions ==
=== Repealed enactments ===
Section 24(2) of the act repealed 195 enactments, listed in the two parts of schedule 6 to the act. The repeals in part I of the schedule did not affect any money borrowed before the coming into force of the act, or any requirement as respects any account or statement for the year ending on 31 March 1968 or any earlier year, and the repeals in part II of the schedule did not have effect in relation to any loans made before the coming into force of the act.

Part I — General
Citation	Short title	Extent of repeal
56 Geo. 3. c. 98	Consolidated Fund Act 1816	Section 22.
59 Geo. 3. c. 76	Bank of England Act 1819	The whole act.
17 & 18 Vict. c. 94	Public Revenue and Consolidated Fund Charges Act 1854	Section 2.
26 & 27 Vict. c. 25	Savings Bank Investment Act 1863	The whole act.
29 & 30 Vict. c. 39	Exchequer and Audit Departments Act 1866	Section 21.
34 & 35 Vict. c. 36	Pensions Commutation Act 1871	Section 12.
38 & 39 Vict. c. 45	Sinking Fund Act 1875	The whole act.
40 & 41 Vict. c. 2	Treasury Bills Act 1877	Section 3.
40 & 41 Vict. c. 2	Treasury Bills Act 1877	In section 5 the words from the beginning to "the Exchequer".
40 & 41 Vict. c. 2	Treasury Bills Act 1877	Sections 6 and 7.
40 & 41 Vict. c. 2	Treasury Bills Act 1877	Section 13.
45 & 46 Vict. c. 72	Revenue, Friendly Societies and National Debt Act 1882	In section 18 the proviso.
47 & 48 Vict. c. 23	National Debt (Conversion of Stock) Act 1884	In section 1(5) the words "and paid out of the permanent annual charge of the National Debt".
47 & 48 Vict. c. 23	National Debt (Conversion of Stock) Act 1884	In section 9 the definition of the permanent annual charge of the National Debt.
47 & 48 Vict. c. 62	Revenue Act 1884	Section 13.
54 & 55 Vict. c. 24	Public Accounts and Charges Act 1891	Section 4.
55 & 56 Vict. c. 48	Bank Act 1892	Sections 1 to 4.
55 & 56 Vict. c. 48	Bank Act 1892	In section 5(1) the words "as part of the permanent annual charge of the National Debt".
57 & 58 Vict. c. 60	Merchant Shipping Act 1894	Section 661.
57 & 58 Vict. c. 60	Merchant Shipping Act 1894	Section 674.
60 & 61 Vict. c. 27	Public Offices (Whitehall) Site Act 1897	Section 4.
61 & 62 Vict. c. 10	Finance Act 1898	Section 15.
61 & 62 Vict. c. 44	Merchant Shipping (Mercantile Marine Fund) Act 1898	In section 2(4) the words "six hundred and sixty-one".
3 Edw. 7. c. 37	Irish Land Act 1903	Section 32.
6 Edw. 7. c. 20	Revenue Act 1906	Section 10.
4 & 5 Geo. 5. c. 31	Housing Act 1914	Section 2.
5 & 6 Geo. 5. c. 62	Finance Act 1915	Section 25.
9 & 10 Geo. 5. c. 37	War Loan Act 1919	Section 1(1)(2)(5)(6).
10 & 11 Geo. 5. c. 67	Government of Ireland Act 1920	In section 20(3) the words from "and an officer" to the end of the subsection.
11 & 12 Geo. 5. c. 32	Finance Act 1921	In section 45(2) the words "out of the Consolidated Fund".
20 & 21 Geo. 5. c. 28	Finance Act 1930	Section 48.
21 & 22 Geo. 5. c. 41	Agricultural Land (Utilisation) Act 1931	Section 22.
21 & 22 Geo. 5. c. 41	Agricultural Land (Utilisation) Act 1931	In section 24(a) the words "Except for the purposes of section 22".
22 & 23 Geo. 5. c. 25	Finance Act 1932	In section 24, subsections (2), (4), (5) and (6).
22 & 23 Geo. 5. c. 25	Finance Act 1932	Section 26.
24 & 25 Geo. 5. c. 10	North Atlantic Shipping Act 1934	The whole act.
24 & 25 Geo. 5. c. 54	Cattle Industry (Emergency Provisions) Act 1934	The whole act.
26 Geo. 5 & 1 Edw. 8. c. 26	Land Registration Act 1936	Section 4(1).
26 Geo. 5 & 1 Edw. 8. c. 26	Land Registration Act 1936	In section 5(1) the proviso.
26 Geo. 5 & 1 Edw. 8. c. 43	Tithe Act 1936	Section 24(6).
26 Geo. 5 & 1 Edw. 8. c. 43	Tithe Act 1936	Section 26(2)(4).
26 Geo. 5 & 1 Edw. 8. c. 47	Crown Lands Act 1936	Section 1(6).
1 & 2 Geo. 6. c. 25	Eire (Confirmation of Agreements) Act 1938	In section 2(3) paragraphs (b), (c) and (d).
1 & 2 Geo. 6. c. 25	Eire (Confirmation of Agreements) Act 1938	Section 3(2).
1 & 2 Geo. 6. c. 60	Anglo-Turkish (Armaments Credit) Agreement Act 1938	The whole act.
2 & 3 Geo. 6. c. 7	Currency and Bank Notes Act 1939	The whole act.
2 & 3 Geo. 6. c. 57	War Risks Insurance Act 1939	In section 16(3) the words from "and the amount" to the end of the subsection.
2 & 3 Geo. 6. c. 57	War Risks Insurance Act 1939	Section 17.
2 & 3 Geo. 6. c. 64	Currency (Defence) Act 1939	The whole act.
2 & 3 Geo. 6. c. 117	National Loans Act 1939	Sections 1 and 2.
2 & 3 Geo. 6. c. 117	National Loans Act 1939	In section 3, subsections (2) and (5).
2 & 3 Geo. 6. c. 117	National Loans Act 1939	Section 4, but not so as to invalidate anything done before the coming into force of this Act.
2 & 3 Geo. 6. c. 117	National Loans Act 1939	Schedule 1.
2 & 3 Geo. 6. c. 117	National Loans Act 1939	In Schedule 2, paragraph 3.
3 & 4 Geo. 6. c. 3	National Loans Act 1940	The whole act.
3 & 4 Geo. 6. c. 23	National Loans (No. 2) Act 1940	Section 1.
4 & 5 Geo. 6. c. 18	National Loans Act 1941	The whole act.
4 & 5 Geo. 6. c. 30	Finance Act 1941	Section 49.
5 & 6 Geo. 6. c. 14	National Loans Act 1942	The whole act.
5 & 6 Geo. 6. c. 21	Finance Act 1942	Section 45.
6 & 7 Geo. 6. c. 13	National Loans Act 1943	The whole act.
6 & 7 Geo. 6. c. 28	Finance Act 1943	Section 29.
7 & 8 Geo. 6. c. 19	National Loans Act 1944	The whole act.
7 & 8 Geo. 6. c. 23	Finance Act 1944	Section 47.
7 & 8 Geo. 6. c. 36	Housing (Temporary Accommodation) Act 1944	In section 8 subsections (1), (2), (4) and (7).
8 & 9 Geo. 6. c. 23	National Loans Act 1945	The whole act.
8 & 9 Geo. 6. c. 24	Finance Act 1945	Section 6.
9 & 10 Geo. 6. c. 13	Finance (No. 2) Act 1945	Section 48(2).
9 & 10 Geo. 6. c. 19	Bretton Woods Agreements Act 1945	Section 1.
9 & 10 Geo. 6. c. 19	Bretton Woods Agreements Act 1945	In section 2, in subsection (1) the words "out of the Consolidated Fund of the United Kingdom" and the words from "and the Treasury" to the end of the subsection, in subsection (2) the words "the Fund or" and subsection (3).
9 & 10 Geo. 6. c. 20	Building Materials and Housing Act 1945	Sections 1 and 4.
9 & 10 Geo. 6. c. 20	Building Materials and Housing Act 1945	Section 10(4).
9 & 10 Geo. 6. c. 27	Bank of England Act 1946	In Schedule 1, paragraphs 2 and 12 and in paragraph 13, the words from "and issued out" to the end of the paragraph.
9 & 10 Geo. 6. c. 40	Miscellaneous Financial Provisions Act 1946	In section 1 subsection (1) and in subsection (2)(b) the words from "and then issued" to the end of the subsection.
9 & 10 Geo. 6. c. 40	Miscellaneous Financial Provisions Act 1946	Section 3(2).
9 & 10 Geo. 6. c. 40	Miscellaneous Financial Provisions Act 1946	Section 4.
9 & 10 Geo. 6. c. 59	Coal Industry Nationalisation Act 1946	In section 28(2), the words from "and shall be issued" to the end of the subsection.
9 & 10 Geo. 6. c. 59	Coal Industry Nationalisation Act 1946	Section 33(3)(5).
9 & 10 Geo. 6. c. 59	Coal Industry Nationalisation Act 1946	Section 34(2).
9 & 10 Geo. 6. c. 64	Finance Act 1946	Section 64.
9 & 10 Geo. 6. c. 68	New Towns Act 1946	Section 12(4)(6).
9 & 10 Geo. 6. c. 68	New Towns Act 1946	In section 13(4) the words "out of the Consolidated Fund".
9 & 10 Geo. 6. c. 82	Cable and Wireless Act 1946	In section 3(5), the words from "and issued out" to the end of the subsection.
9 & 10 Geo. 6. c. 82	Cable and Wireless Act 1946	In Schedule 2, paragraphs 3 and 8.
10 & 11 Geo. 6. c. 26	Cotton (Centralised Buying) Act 1947	Section 21.
10 & 11 Geo. 6. c. 53	Town and Country Planning (Scotland) Act 1947	Section 64.
10 & 11 Geo. 6. c. 53	Town and Country Planning (Scotland) Act 1947	Section 65(3).
11 & 12 Geo. 6. c. 6	Housing (Temporary Accommodation) Act 1947	The whole act.
12, 13 & 14 Geo. 6. c. 14	Export Guarantees Act 1949	In section 3, subsection (2), subsection (4)(a) with the word "and", subsection (5)(b) and subsection (6).
12, 13 & 14 Geo. 6. c. 20	Cinematograph Film Production (Special Loans) Act 1949	Section 7.
12, 13 & 14 Geo. 6. c. 20	Cinematograph Film Production (Special Loans) Act 1949	In section 8, in subsection (1), the words from "and shall be issued" to the end of the subsection and subsections (2) and (3).
12, 13 & 14 Geo. 6. c. 36	War Damage (Public Utility Undertakings) Act 1949	Section 3(5).
12, 13 & 14 Geo. 6. c. 77	Armed Forces (Housing Loans) Act 1949	Section 1(2)(4).
14 Geo. 6. c. 21	Miscellaneous Financial Provisions Act 1950	Section 2(2)(4).
14 Geo. 6. c. 34	Housing (Scotland) Act 1950	Section 94(3)(5).
14 & 15 Geo. 6. c. 8	European Payments Union (Financial Provisions) Act 1950	The whole act.
15 & 16 Geo. 6 & 1 Eliz. 2. c. 57	Marine and Aviation Insurance (War Risks) Act 1952	In section 5(3) the words from "and the amount" to the end of the subsection.
15 & 16 Geo. 6 & 1 Eliz. 2. c. 57	Marine and Aviation Insurance (War Risks) Act 1952	Section 6.
1 & 2 Eliz. 2. c. 15	Iron and Steel Act 1953	Section 22.
2 & 3 Eliz. 2. c. 24	Cotton Act 1954	Section 5(4).
2 & 3 Eliz. 2. c. 44	Finance Act 1954	Section 34(1)(2).
2 & 3 Eliz. 2. c. 44	Finance Act 1954	In Schedule 5, paragraphs 1, 3 and 4.
2 & 3 Eliz. 2. c. 62	Post Office Savings Bank Act 1954	In section 17(1) the word "or" at the end of paragraph (c), and paragraph (d).
2 & 3 Eliz. 2. c. 63	Trustee Savings Banks Act 1954	In section 32(1) the word "or" at the end of paragraph (c), and paragraph (d).
2 & 3 Eliz. 2. c. 73	Town and Country Planning (Scotland) Act 1954	In section 64, subsections (2)(5)(6)(7), in subsection (3)(c) the words "subject to the next following subsection" and in subsection (4), as respects sums paid after the coming into force of this Act, the words from "and shall be treated" to the end of the subsection.
3 & 4 Eliz. 2. c. 22	Pensions (India, Pakistan and Burma) Act 1955	Section 1(1)(b).
3 & 4 Eliz. 2. c. 24	Requisitioned Houses and Housing (Amendment) Act 1955	Section 15.
4 & 5 Eliz. 2. c. 5	International Finance Corporation Act 1955	In section 2 subsections (1) and (2) and in subsection (3) the words from "and the sums so paid" to the end of the subsection.
4 & 5 Eliz. 2. c. 6	Miscellaneous Financial Provisions Act 1955	Section 2.
4 & 5 Eliz. 2. c. 48	Sugar Act 1956	In section 5, subsection (3), and in subsection (5) the words from "and shall be issued" to the end of the subsection.
4 & 5 Eliz. 2. c. 54	Finance Act 1956	In section 42(6), the words from "and shall be issued" to the end of the subsection.
4 & 5 Eliz. 2. c. 54	Finance Act 1956	Section 43(1).
5 & 6 Eliz. 2. c. 49	Finance Act 1957	Section 41.
6 & 7 Eliz. 2. c. 42	Housing (Financial Provisions) Act 1958	In section 17, subsections (4) and (6) and in subsection (8), the words from "and issued out of" to the end of the subsection.
7 & 8 Eliz. 2. c. 1	Armed Forces (Housing Loans) Act 1958	In section 2(2), paragraph (a).
7 & 8 Eliz. 2. c. 6	National Debt Act 1958	In section 7, subsections (1), (4) and (5).
7 & 8 Eliz. 2. c. 6	National Debt Act 1958	In section 9, subsections (2) and (4) and, except as respects securities issued under that section before the coming into force of this Act, the remainder of the section.
7 & 8 Eliz. 2. c. 6	National Debt Act 1958	Section 14(2).
7 & 8 Eliz. 2. c. 11	European Monetary Agreement Act 1959	In section 2, subsection (3), and in subsection (4) the words "out of the Consolidated Fund" and the words from "and any sums" to the end of the subsection.
7 & 8 Eliz. 2. c. 17	International Bank and Monetary Fund Act 1959	In section 1, the words "out of the Consolidated Fund of the United Kingdom", paragraph (a) and the words following paragraph (b).
7 & 8 Eliz. 2. c. 23	Overseas Resources Development Act 1959	In section 18, subsections (1) and (3).
7 & 8 Eliz. 2. c. 23	Overseas Resources Development Act 1959	In section 19, in subsection (1), the words from "and shall be issued" to the end of the subsection and subsections (2) and (3).
7 & 8 Eliz. 2. c. 28	Income Tax (Repayment of Post-war Credits) Act 1959	Section 4(2).
7 & 8 Eliz. 2. c. 33	House Purchase and Housing Act 1959	In section 2, in subsection (5) the words from "and for the purpose" to the end of the subsection and in subsection (6) the words from "and shall be issued" to the end of the subsection.
7 & 8 Eliz. 2. c. 71	Colonial Development and Welfare Act 1959	In section 3 in subsection (1) the words from "and any sums" to the end of the subsection and subsections (2) and (4).
8 & 9 Eliz. 2. c. 26	Iron and Steel (Financial Provisions) Act 1960	The whole act.
8 & 9 Eliz. 2. c. 35	International Development Association Act 1960	In section 2, subsections (1) and (2) and in subsection (3) the words from "and the sums so paid" to the end of the subsection.
9 & 10 Eliz. 2. c. 8	Electricity (Amendment) Act 1961	Section 1(4).
9 & 10 Eliz. 2. c. 15	Post Office Act 1961	In section 9, subsection (3) and in subsection (4) the words from "and shall be issued" to the end of the subsection.
9 & 10 Eliz. 2. c. 15	Post Office Act 1961	Section 13(4)(5).
9 & 10 Eliz. 2. c. 15	Post Office Act 1961	Section 14(3).
9 & 10 Eliz. 2. c. 15	Post Office Act 1961	Section 19(1).
9 & 10 Eliz. 2. c. 36	Finance Act 1961	Section 35(3)(4)(6)(7).
9 & 10 Eliz. 2. c. 36	Finance Act 1961	Section 36.
9 & 10 Eliz. 2. c. 49	Covent Garden Market Act 1961	In section 40, subsection (5) and in subsection (6) the words from "and shall be issued" to the end of the subsection.
9 & 10 Eliz. 2. c. 53	North Atlantic Shipping Act 1961	The whole act.
9 & 10 Eliz. 2. c. 62	Trustee Investments Act 1961	In Schedule 1 in the definition of "Treasury Bills" in paragraph 4 of Part IV the words "Exchequer bills and other".
9 & 10 Eliz. 2. c. 65	Housing Act 1961	In section 7, in subsection (5) the words from "and for the purpose" to the end of the subsection, and in subsection (6) the words from "and shall be issued" to the end of the subsection.
10 & 11 Eliz. 2. c. 28	Housing (Scotland) Act 1962	In section 11, in subsection (5) the words from "and for the purpose", to the end of the subsection and in subsection (6) the words from "and shall be issued" to the end of the subsection.
10 & 11 Eliz. 2. c. 38	Town and Country Planning Act 1962	In section 194, subsections (5), (6) and (7) and in subsection (4), as respects payments made after the coming into force of this Act, the words from "and shall be treated" to the end of the subsection.
10 & 11 Eliz. 2. c. 38	Town and Country Planning Act 1962	In Schedule 14 paragraphs 40, 41 and 42.
10 & 11 Eliz. 2. c. 46	Transport Act 1962	In section 20, subsection (4) and in subsection (5) the words from "and shall be issued" to the end of the subsection.
10 & 11 Eliz. 2. c. 46	Transport Act 1962	In section 29(10) the words from "and so much" to the end of the subsection.
10 & 11 Eliz. 2. c. 46	Transport Act 1962	Section 36(4).
10 & 11 Eliz. 2. c. 46	Transport Act 1962	Section 37.
10 & 11 Eliz. 2. c. 46	Transport Act 1962	In section 39(8) the words from "and shall be issued" to the end of the subsection.
1963 c. 25	Finance Act 1963	Section 72.
1963 c. 59	Electricity and Gas Act 1963	In section 2 subsection (5) and in subsection (6) the words from "and shall be issued" to the end of the subsection.
1964 c. 7	Shipbuilding Credit Act 1964	In section 2, subsection (2), in subsection (3) the words from "and shall be issued" to the end of the subsection and subsection (6).
1964 c. 13	International Development Association Act 1964	In section 2, in subsection (1) the words "out of the Consolidated Fund of the United Kingdom" and subsection (2).
1964 c. 40	Harbours Act 1964	In section 43, subsection (3) and in subsection (4) the words from "and shall be issued" to the end of the subsection.
1964 c. 49	Finance Act 1964	Section 25.
1964 c. 56	Housing Act 1964	Section 9(4)(6).
1964 c. 56	Housing Act 1964	In section 10(4) the words "out of the Consolidated Fund".
1965 c. 2	Administration of Justice Act 1965	In section 12(4) the words from "and shall be issued" to the end of the subsection.
1965 c. 9	Armed Forces (Housing Loans) Act 1965	In the Schedule section 1(2)(4) of the Armed Forces (Housing Loans) Act 1949 set out as amended.
1965 c. 16	Airports Authority Act 1965	In section 4(5) the words from "and shall be issued" to the end of the subsection.
1965 c. 16	Airports Authority Act 1965	In section 6, subsection (4) and in subsection (5) the words from "and shall be issued" to the end of the subsection.
1965 c. 36	Gas Act 1965	Section 31(1).
1965 c. 59	New Towns Act 1965	Section 44(2)(4).
1965 c. 59	New Towns Act 1965	In section 45(2) the words from "and section 44(4)" to the end of the subsection.
1965 c. 59	New Towns Act 1965	In section 46(5)(a) and (b) the words "out of the Consolidated Fund", and in section 46(5)(a) the words "and paid into the Exchequer" in the second place where those words occur.
1965 c. 62	Redundancy Payments Act 1965	Section 35(3)(5).
1965 c. 65	International Monetary Fund Act 1965	The whole act.
1966 c. 15	Military Aircraft (Loans) Act 1966	Section 1(3).
1966 c. 15	Military Aircraft (Loans) Act 1966	Section 2(2).
1966 c. 21	Overseas Aid Act 1966	In section 2 in subsection (1) the words "out of the Consolidated Fund of the United Kingdom" subsection (2) and in subsection (3) the words from "and shall be issued" to the end of the subsection.
1966 c. 28	Docks and Harbours Act 1966	In section 41(9) the words from "and shall be issued" to the end of the subsection.
1966 c. 50	Industrial Reorganisation Corporation Act 1966	In section 4 subsection (4) and in subsection (5) the words from "and shall be issued" to the end of the subsection.
1967 c. 1	Land Commission Act 1967	Section 3(3)(5).
1967 c. 17	Iron and Steel Act 1967	In section 18(3) the words from "and shall be issued" to the end of the subsection.
1967 c. 17	Iron and Steel Act 1967	In section 20 subsection (4) and in subsection (5) the words from "and shall be issued" to the end of the subsection.
1967 c. 17	Iron and Steel Act 1967	Section 26(5)(6).
1967 c. 33	Air Corporations Act 1967	In section 8 subsection (4) and in subsection (5) the words from "and shall be issued" to the end of the subsection.
1967 c. 40	Shipbuilding Industry Act 1967	In section 10, subsections (3) and (6) and in subsection (7) the words from "and subsection (6)" to the end of the subsection.

Part I — Local Act
Citation	Short title	Extent of repeal
1966 c. xxv	Tees and Hartlepools Port Authority Act 1966	In section 32(6) the words from "and shall be issued" to end of the subsection.

Part II — Public Works Loans
Citation	Short title	Extent of repeal
15 & 16 Vict. c. 85	Burial Act 1852	Section 21.
24 & 25 Vict. c. 47	Harbours and Passing Tolls, &c, Act 1861	Section 3(2).
25 & 26 Vict. c. 69	Harbours Transfer Act 1862	Section 20.
29 & 30 Vict. c. 30	Harbour Loans Act 1866	The whole act.
35 & 36 Vict. c. 23	Isle of Man Harbours Act 1872	In section 20 the words from "The Public Works Loan Commissioners" to the end of the section.
38 & 39 Vict. c. 55	Public Health Act 1875	Sections 242 and 243.
38 & 39 Vict. c. 55	Public Health Act 1875	In section 301 the words from "whenever" to the end of the section.
38 & 39 Vict. c. 58	Public Works Loans (Money) Act 1875	The whole act.
38 & 39 Vict. c. 83	Local Loans Act 1875	Section 28.
38 & 39 Vict. c. 89	Public Works Loans Act 1875	Section 3.
38 & 39 Vict. c. 89	Public Works Loans Act 1875	In section 5(3) the words from "within three months" to "made", the word "forthwith" and the words from "if Parliament" to the end of paragraph (3).
38 & 39 Vict. c. 89	Public Works Loans Act 1875	In section 9 the words from the beginning to "such purpose".
38 & 39 Vict. c. 89	Public Works Loans Act 1875	Section 40.
38 & 39 Vict. c. 89	Public Works Loans Act 1875	In section 41 the words "and the National Debt Commissioners".
38 & 39 Vict. c. 89	Public Works Loans Act 1875	In section 43 the words from "Such accounts as the Treasury" to the end of the section.
38 & 39 Vict. c. 89	Public Works Loans Act 1875	Section 49.
38 & 39 Vict. c. 89	Public Works Loans Act 1875	Section 56.
38 & 39 Vict. c. 89	Public Works Loans Act 1875	Schedule 1.
39 & 40 Vict. c. 31	Public Works Loans (Money) Act 1876	Section 6.
41 & 42 Vict. c. 18	Public Works Loans Act 1878	The whole act.
44 & 45 Vict. c. 38	Public Works Loans Act 1881	Section 7.
50 & 51 Vict. c. 16	National Debt and Local Loans Act 1887	The whole act.
55 & 56 Vict. c. 43	Military Lands Act 1892	Section 7.
57 & 58 Vict. c. 11	Public Works Loans Act 1894	The whole act.
59 & 60 Vict. c. 42	Public Works Loans Act 1896	The whole act.
60 & 61 Vict. c. 6	Military Lands Act 1897	In section 1 the words "and of the Public Works Loan Commissioners to lend" and the words "and lending".
60 & 61 Vict. c. 51	Public Works Loans Act 1897	The whole act.
62 & 63 Vict. c. 31	Public Works Loans Act 1899	The whole act.
62 & 63 Vict. c. 36	Colonial Loans Act 1899	The whole act.
62 & 63 Vict. c. 44	Small Dwellings Acquisition Act 1899	Section 9(7).
63 & 64 Vict. c. 56	Military Lands Act 1900	In section 1(2) the words "and of the Public Works Loan Commissioners to lend" and the words "and lending".
3 Edw. 7. c. 46	Revenue Act 1903	In section 16(1) the words "or of an advance from the Local Loans Fund".
7 Edw. 7. c. 36	Public Works Loans Act 1907	The whole act.
7 Edw. 7. c. 43	Education (Administrative Provisions) Act 1907	Section 8.
8 Edw. 7. c. 23	Public Works Loans Act 1908	The whole act.
8 Edw. 7. c. 36	Small Holdings and Allotments Act 1908	Section 52(2).
8 Edw. 7. c. 36	Small Holdings and Allotments Act 1908	Section 53(5).
9 & 10 Geo. 5. c. 59	Land Settlement (Facilities) Act 1919	Section 14.
10 & 11 Geo. 5. c. 67	Government of Ireland Act 1920	In section 21(2) the words from "and money for loans" to the end of the subsection.
12 & 13 Geo. 5. c. 51	Allotments Act 1922	Section 18(1).
13 & 14 Geo. 5. c. 24	Housing, &c., Act 1923	In section 6(1) the words from "or the terms and" to the end of the subsection.
13 & 14 Geo. 5. c. 34	Agricultural Credits Act 1923	Section 1.
15 & 16 Geo. 5. c. 61	Allotments Act 1925	Section 2.
16 & 17 Geo. 5. c. 56	Housing (Rural Workers) Act 1926	In section 2(5)(a) the words "under section one of the Public Works Loans Act 1897" and the words "out of the Local Loans Fund".
16 & 17 Geo. 5. c. 56	Housing (Rural Workers) Act 1926	In section 5(4) the words from "and the raising" to the end of the subsection.
18 & 19 Geo. 5. c. 43	Agricultural Credits Act 1928	Section 1(3).
19 & 20 Geo. 5. c. 13	Agricultural Credits (Scotland) Act 1929	Section 1(3).
20 & 21 Geo. 5. c. 44	Land Drainage Act 1930	Section 46(5).
25 & 26 Geo. 5. c. 24	Finance Act 1935	Sections 28 to 31.
25 & 26 Geo. 5. c. 40	Housing Act 1935	In section 37(3) the words "under section 1 of the Public Works Loans Act 1897" and the words "out of the Local Loans Fund".
25 & 26 Geo. 5. c. 40	Housing Act 1935	In section 92(2) the words "under section one of the Public Works Loans Act 1897" and the words "out of the Local Loans Fund".
25 & 26 Geo. 5. c. 41	Housing (Scotland) Act 1935	In section 34(3) the words "under section 1 of the Public Works Loans Act 1897" and the words "out of the Local Loans Fund".
25 & 26 Geo. 5. c. 41	Housing (Scotland) Act 1935	In section 83(2) the words "under section one of the Public Works Loans Act 1897" and the words "out of the Local Loans Fund".
26 Geo. 5 & 1 Edw. 8. c. 5	Public Works Loans Act 1935	The whole act.
26 Geo. 5 & 1 Edw. 8. c. 49	Public Health Act 1936	Section 311.
1 & 2 Geo. 6. c. 7	Public Works Loans (No. 2) Act 1937	The whole act.
2 & 3 Geo. 6. c. 31	Civil Defence Act 1939	Section 29(4).
4 & 5 Geo. 6. c. 14	Public Works Loans Act 1941	The whole act.
5 & 6 Geo. 6. c. 21	Finance Act 1942	In Part I of Schedule 11 the words "Local Loans three per cent. Stock", and the last entry (stock and bonds under ss. 28 and 29 of the Finance Act 1935).
5 & 6 Geo. 6. c. 21	Finance Act 1942	In Part II of Schedule 11 the entry relating to the National Debt and Local Loans Act 1887.
8 & 9 Geo. 6. c. 18	Local Authorities Loans Act 1945	In section 2 subsection (1) and in subsection (2) the word "such".
8 & 9 Geo. 6. c. 18	Local Authorities Loans Act 1945	Sections 3 and 5.
8 & 9 Geo. 6. c. 33	Town and Country Planning (Scotland) Act 1945	Section 46.
9 & 10 Geo. 6. c. 75	Public Works Loans (No. 2) Act 1946	The whole act.
10 & 11 Geo. 6. c. 43	Local Government (Scotland) Act 1947	Section 276(1).
14 Geo. 6. c. 34	Housing (Scotland) Act 1950	In paragraph 5(1) proviso of Schedule 7 the words "under section one of the Public Works Loans Act 1897" and the words "out of the Local Loans Fund".
15 & 16 Geo. 6 & 1 Eliz. 2. c. 52	Prison Act 1952	Section 38(3).
1 & 2 Eliz. 2. c. 3	Public Works Loans Act 1952	In section 6 subsections (1) and (2).
3 & 4 Eliz. 2. c. 13	Rural Water Supplies and Sewerage Act 1955	In section 1(3)(b) the words "from the Local Loans Fund".
4 & 5 Eliz. 2. c. 16	Food and Drugs Act 1955	In section 88(3) the words from "and for the purposes" to the end of the subsection.
4 & 5 Eliz. 2. c. 16	Food and Drugs Act 1955	In Schedule 9 the entry relating to section 311 of the Public Health Act 1936.
6 & 7 Eliz. 2. c. 42	Housing (Financial Provisions) Act 1958	In the proviso to paragraph 7(1) of Schedule 3 the words "under section one of the Public Works Loans Act 1897" and the words "out of the Local Loans Fund".
7 & 8 Eliz. 2. c. 25	Highways Act 1959	In section 198(2) the words "under section one of the Public Works Loans Act 1897".
9 & 10 Eliz. 2. c. 65	Housing Act 1961	In section 7(2)(a) the words "under section one of the Public Works Loans Act 1897".
10 & 11 Eliz. 2. c. 28	Housing (Scotland) Act 1962	In section 11(2)(a) the words "under section one of the Public Works Loans Act 1897".
10 & 11 Eliz. 2. c. 38	Town and Country Planning Act 1962	Section 187.
1963 c. 29	Local Authorities (Land) Act 1963	In section 3(4), the words "under section 1 of the Public Works Loans Act 1897".
1964 c. 9	Public Works Loans Act 1964	Sections 1 to 5.
1964 c. 9	Public Works Loans Act 1964	In section 9 subsection (2) and in subsection (3) paragraphs (a) and (c).
1964 c. 9	Public Works Loans Act 1964	All the Schedules.
1964 c. 40	Harbours Act 1964	In section 13(2), in paragraph (a) the words "or section 9 of the Public Works Loans Act 1875" and paragraph (b).
1964 c. 67	Local Government (Development and Finance) (Scotland) Act 1964	In section 7(4) the word "lower" and the words "under section 2 of the Public Works Loans Act 1964".
1965 c. 63	Public Works Loans Act 1965	Section 1.
1966 c. 16	Public Works Loans Act 1966	The whole act.
1967 c. 61	Public Works Loans Act 1967	Section 1.

== Subsequent developments ==
Section 21(4) of the act was repealed by section 1(1) of, and part XIII of schedule 1 to, the Statute Law (Repeals) Act 1973, which came into force on 18 July 1973.
