= Savings Bank (Scotland) Act 1819 =

Act of the Parliament of the United Kingdom

Savings Bank (Scotland) Act 1819 (Note: The citation of this act by this short title was authorised by section 5 of, and the second schedule to, the Statute Law Revision Act 1948. Due to the repeal of those provisions, it is now authorised by section 19(2) of the Interpretation Act 1978.)
- Act of Parliament
- Parliament of the United Kingdom
- Long title: An Act for the Protection of Banks for Savings in Scotland. (Note: These words are printed against this act in the second column of the second schedule to the Statute Law Revision Act 1948, which is headed "Title".)
- Citation: 59 Geo. 3. c. 62
- Territorial extent: Scotland (Note: Preamble.)

Dates
- Royal assent: 2 July 1819
- Commencement: 2 July 1819 (Note: The Acts of Parliament (Commencement) Act 1793.)
Other legislation
Amended by	Savings Bank Act 1835; Trustee Savings Banks Act 1863; Statute Law Revision Act 1948; Trustee Savings Banks Act 1954; Decimal Currency Act 1969; Trustee Savings Banks Act 1969; Sheriff Courts (Scotland) Act 1971; District Courts (Scotland) Act 1975; Trustee Savings Banks Act 1981; Trustee Savings Banks Act 1985 (Appointed Day) (No. 4) Order 1986
Relates to	Savings Bank Act 1828

Status: Amended

Text of statute as originally enacted

Revised text of statute as amended

Text of the Savings Bank (Scotland) Act 1819 as in force today (including any amendments) within the United Kingdom, from legislation.gov.uk.

The Savings Bank (Scotland) Act 1819 (59 Geo. 3. c. 62) is an act of the Parliament of the United Kingdom.

== Subsequent developments ==
Section 2 of the Savings Bank Act 1835 (5 & 6 Will. 4. c. 57) repealed the act, so far as the same was applicable to any savings bank thereafter to be formed and established in Scotland from and after 9 September 1835. Section 2 further provided that the provisions of the act were to continue in force as to all savings banks established under it before 9 September 1835 unless and until they conformed to and were established under the provisions of the Savings Bank Act 1828 (9 Geo. 4. c. 92) and the Savings Bank Act 1833 (3 & 4 Will. 4. c. 14)..

Section 1 of the Trustee Savings Bank Act 1863 (26 & 27 Vict. c. 87) provided that this act was to continue in force as to all savings banks established under it before the passing of that act, unless and until they conformed to and were established under the provisions of that act.

Section 96(4)(a) of the Trustee Savings Banks Act 1969 provided that nothing in the repeals made by section 82 of the Trustee Savings Banks Act 1954 (2 & 3 Eliz. 2. c. 63) was to affect the application of this act to any savings bank established under that act before 28 July 1863 unless and until that bank became a trustee savings bank.

section 55(2) of, and paragraph 15(a) of schedule 7 to, the Trustee Savings Banks Act 1981 provided that nothing in the repeals made by the 1954 act was to affect the application of the 1819 act to any savings bank established under that act before 28 July 1863 unless and until that bank became a trustee savings bank.

See further article 12(h) of the Trustee Savings Banks Act 1985 (Appointed Day) (No. 4) Order 1986 (SI 1986/1223).

Sections 2 and 4 were amended by section 24(1) of, and schedule 1 to, the District Courts (Scotland) Act 1975.
