= National Debt Office =

National Debt Office may refer to:

- The United Kingdom National Debt Office, operated by the Commissioners for the Reduction of the National Debt
  - Since 2002, the UK Debt Management Office
- Swedish National Debt Office
