= CRND =

CRND may refer to:

- Commissioners for the Reduction of the National Debt
- Centre for Research in Neurodegenerative Diseases
