= Trustee Savings Banks Act 1863 =

Act of the Parliament of the United Kingdom

Trustee Savings Banks Act 1863 (Note: The citation of this act by this short title was authorised by section 1 of the Trustee Savings Banks Act 1887 (50 & 51 Vict. c. 47) as well as section 1 of, and the first schedule to, the Short Titles Act 1896. Due to the repeal of those provisions it is now authorised by section 19(2) of the Interpretation Act 1978.)
- Act of Parliament
- Parliament of the United Kingdom
- Long title: An Act to consolidate and amend the Laws relating to Savings Banks.
- Citation: 26 & 27 Vict. c. 87
- Territorial extent: England and Wales; Scotland; Ireland; Guernsey; Jersey; Isle of Man; (Note: Section 67.)

Dates
- Royal assent: 28 July 1863
- Commencement: 20 November 1863 (Note: Section 1.)
- Repealed: 25 January 1955
Other legislation
Amends	Savings Bank Act 1828; Savings Bank Act 1833; Savings Bank Act 1835; Savings Bank Act 1844; Savings Banks (Ireland) Act 1848; Savings Banks and Friendly Societies Act 1854; Savings Bank (Charitable Societies) Act 1859; Savings Bank (Charitable Societies) Act 1859; National Debt Commissioners (Investments) Act 1860
Amended by	Savings Banks Act 1880; Trustee Savings Banks Act 1887; Perjury Act 1911; Trustee Savings Banks Act 1918; False Oaths (Scotland) Act 1933
Repealed by	Trustee Savings Banks Act 1954
Relates to	Savings Bank (Scotland) Act 1819

Status: Repealed

Text of statute as originally enacted

The Trustee Savings Banks Act 1863 (26 & 27 Vict. c. 87) was an act of the Parliament of the United Kingdom that consolidated and amended enactments related to trustee savings banks in the United Kingdom and the British Isles.

== Provisions ==
=== Repealed enactments ===
Section 1 of the act repealed 8 enactments as relates to savings banks established under those acts, listed in the schedule to the act. Section 1 of the act provided that the Savings Bank (Scotland) Act 1819 (59 Geo. 3. c. 62) would continued in force.

Section 68 of the act provided that nothing in the act would repeal anything related to post office savings banks established under the Post Office Savings Bank Act 1861 (24 & 25 Vict. c. 14), or the powers of the Commissioners for the Reduction of the National Debt established under the National Debt Reduction Act 1786 (26 Geo. 3. c. 31).

Citation	Short title	Description	Extent of repeal
9 Geo. 4. c. 92	Savings Bank Act 1828	An Act to consolidate and amend the Laws relating to Savings Banks.	The whole act.
3 & 4 Will. 4. c. 14	Savings Bank Act 1833	An Act to enable Depositors in Savings Banks and others to purchase Government Annuities through the Medium of Savings Banks, and to amend an Act of the Ninth Year of His late Majesty to consolidate and amend the Laws relating to Savings Banks.	Sections 21, 22, 25, 28, 29, 30, 31, 32, 33, 34, and 35.
5 & 6 Will. 4. c. 57	Savings Bank Act 1835	An Act to extend to Scotland certain Provisions of an Act of the Ninth Year of His late Majesty to consolidate and amend the Laws relating to Savings Banks, and to consolidate and amend the Laws relating to Savings Banks in Scotland.	The whole act.
7 & 8 Vict. c. 83	Savings Bank Act 1844	An Act to amend the Laws relating to Savings Banks, and to the Purchase of Government Annuities through the Medium of Savings Banks.	The whole act.
11 & 12 Vict. c. 133	Savings Banks (Ireland) Act 1848	An Act to amend the Laws relating to Savings Banks in Ireland.	The whole act.
17 & 18 Vict. c. 50	Savings Banks and Friendly Societies Act 1854	An Act to continue an Act of the Twelfth Year of Her present Majesty for amending the Laws relating to Savings Banks in Ireland, and to authorize Friendly Societies to invest the whole of their Funds in Savings Banks.	Section 2.
22 & 23 Vict. c. 53	Savings Bank (Charitable Societies) Act 1859	An Act to enable Charitable and Provident Societies and Penny Savings Banks to invest all their Proceeds in Savings Banks.	The whole act.
23 & 24 Vict. c. 137	National Debt Commissioners (Investments) Act 1860	An Act to make further Provision with respect to Monies received from Savings Banks and Friendly Societies.	The whole act.

== Subsequent developments ==
The whole act was repealed by section 82(1) of, and the third schedule to, the Trustee Savings Banks Act 1954 (2 & 3 Eliz. 2. c. 63), which came into force on 25 January 1955.
