= Government Annuities Act 1929 =

Act of the Parliament of the United Kingdom

Government Annuities Act 1929 (Note: Section 70(1).)
- Act of Parliament
- Parliament of the United Kingdom
- Long title: An Act to consolidate the Government Annuities Acts, 1829 to 1888, and the enactments amending those Acts.
- Citation: 19 & 20 Geo. 5. c. 29
- Territorial extent: United Kingdom (Note: Sections 70(2)–(3).)

Dates
- Royal assent: 10 May 1929
- Commencement: 21 November 1929
Other legislation
Amends	See § Repealed enactments
Repeals/revokes	See § Repealed enactments
Amended by	False Oaths (Scotland) Act 1933; Criminal Justice Act 1948; Industrial Assurance and Friendly Societies Act 1948; Statute Law Revision Act 1950; Criminal Justice Act (Northern Ireland) 1953; Miscellaneous Financial Provisions Act 1955; Finance Act 1962; Statute Law Revision Act 1963; Administration of Estates (Small Payments) Act 1965; National Loans Act 1968; Theft Act 1968; Theft Act (Northern Ireland) 1969; Post Office Act 1969; Statute Law (Repeals) Act 1974; Criminal Procedure (Scotland) Act 1975; Perjury (Northern Ireland) Order 1979; Criminal Justice Act 1982; Trustee Savings Banks Act 1985; Finance Act 1985; Statute Law (Repeals) Act 1993; Statute Law (Repeals) Act 1998; Statute Law (Repeals) Act 2004; Crime and Courts Act 2013; Justice Act (Northern Ireland) 2015

Status: Amended

Text of statute as originally enacted

Revised text of statute as amended

Text of the Government Annuities Act 1929 as in force today (including any amendments) within the United Kingdom, from legislation.gov.uk.

The Government Annuities Act 1929 (19 & 20 Geo. 5. c. 29) is an act of the Parliament of the United Kingdom that consolidated enactments relating to government annuities and savings bank annuities and insurances.

== Provisions ==
=== Repealed enactments ===
Sections 36(1), 66(2) and 69 of the act repealed 24 enactments, listed in the parts I, II and III of the second schedule to the act, respectively.

Part I
Citation	Short title	Extent of repeal
48 Geo. 3. c. 142	Life Annuities Act 1808	Sections twenty-one, twenty-three, and twenty-eight.
10 Geo. 4. c. 24	Government Annuities Act 1829	The whole act.
11 Geo. 4. & 1 Will. 4. c. 26	Government Annuities Act 1830	Sections six and nine so far as they relate to annuities under the Government Annuities Act, 1829.
2 & 3 Will. 4. c. 59	Government Annuities Act 1832	The whole act.
3 & 4 Will. 4. c. 24	Government Annuities Act 1833	The whole act.
7 Will. 4. & 1 Vict. c. 84	Forgery Act 1837	The whole act.
1 & 2 Vict. c. 51	Government Annuities Act 1838	Sections eleven and twelve, except so far as they relate to savings bank annuities, and sections thirteen and fourteen.
33 & 34 Vict. c. 71	National Debt Act 1870	Section fifty, section sixty-eight from "In the enactment described" to the end of the section, and Parts III and IV of the Second Schedule so far as unrepealed.
36 & 37 Vict. c. 44	Government Annuities Act 1873	The whole act, except so far as it relates to savings bank annuities.
51 & 52 Vict. c. 15	National Debt (Supplemental) Act 1888	Sections one and two.
61 & 62 Vict. c. 46	Revenue Act 1898	Section eighteen.
3 Edw. 7. c. 46	Revenue Act 1903	Section fifteen, and, so far as it relates to annuities granted under the Government Annuities Act, 1829, section sixteen.
5 & 6 Geo. 5. c. 62	Finance Act 1915	Subsection (2) of section twenty-five.

Part II
Citation	Short title	Extent of repeal
1 & 2 Vict. c. 51	Government Annuities Act 1838	Sections eleven and twelve so far as they relate to savings bank annuities.
16 & 17 Vict. c. 45	Government Annuities Act 1853	The whole act.
27 & 28 Vict. c. 43	Government Annuities Act 1864	The whole act.
36 & 37 Vict. c. 44	Government Annuities Act 1873	The whole act so far as it relates to savings bank annuities.
45 & 46 Vict. c. 51	Government Annuities Act 1882	The whole act.
46 & 47 Vict. c. 47	Provident Nominations and Small Intestacies Act 1883	In section three the words "and subhead (e) of section six of the Government Annuities Act, 1882".
50 & 51 Vict. c. 40	Savings Banks Act 1887	In section eight the words "and of the Government Annuities Act, 1882." Section nine.
3 Edw. 7. c. 46	Revenue Act 1903	Section sixteen so far as it relates to savings bank annuities.
14 & 15 Geo. 5. c. 21	Finance Act 1924	Section thirty-nine.

Part III
Citation	Short title	Extent of repeal
27 & 28 Vict. c. 46	Government Annuities (Investments) Act 1864	The whole act.
50 & 51 Vict. c. 40	Savings Banks Act 1887	Section twelve from "the Government Annuities Acts, 1829 to 1882" to the end of the section. In section thirteen the words "and the Government Annuities Acts, 1829 to 1887".

== Subsequent developments ==
Sections 30 and 65 of the act were repealed by section 1 of, and part II of the schedule to, the Statute Law (Repeals) Act 1974, which came into force on 27 June 1974.

The Finance Act 1962 (10 & 11 Eliz. 2. c. 44) terminated the power to grant new government annuities and life insurances under the act. The National Loans Act 1968 charged existing annuities and savings bank annuities on the National Loans Fund.
