= Robert Stheeman =

Sir Robert Stheeman CB
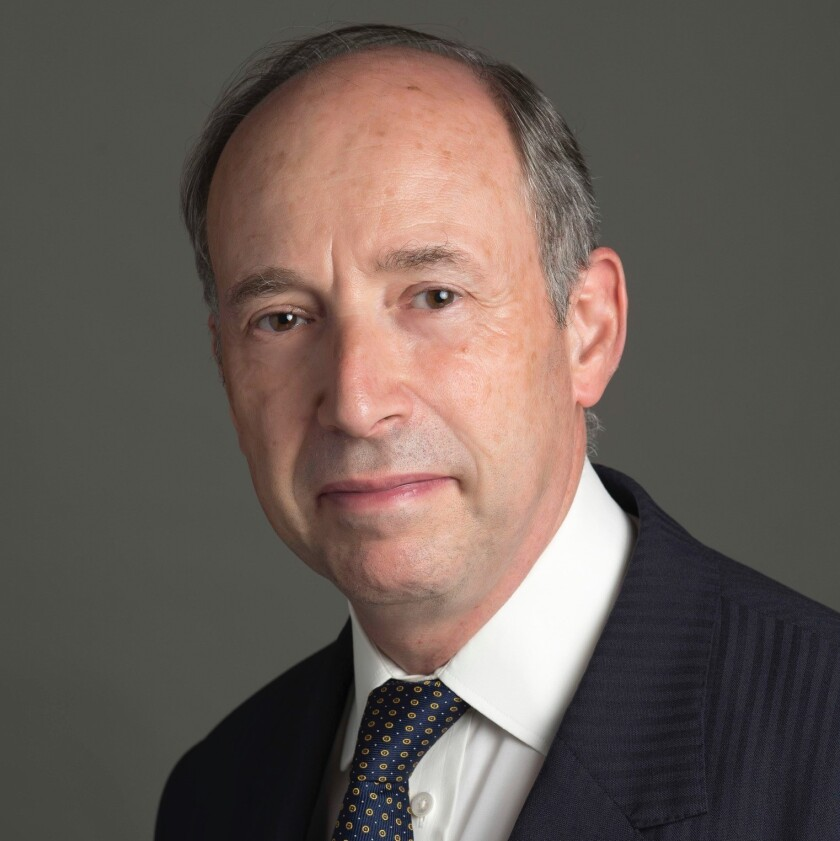
- Stheeman in c. 2020
- Born: 7 June 1959 (age 65); Hammersmith, London
- Occupation: Chief Executive of Debt Management Office
- Years active: 2003–2024
- Employer: Debt Management Office
- Children: 4

Sir Robert Alexander Talma Stheeman CB (born 7 June 1959) is the former chief executive of the Debt Management Office. He previously had a banking career in the UK and Europe.

== Early life ==
Stheeman was born in the United Kingdom and educated at Stowe School before joining the Vereins- und Westbank in Hamburg, Germany in 1979, where he qualified as an official Bankkaufmann.

Stheeman is the son of Sape Talma Stheeman and Cecile Talma Stheeman (nee Mendelssohn Bartholdy) and has been married to Elisabeth Stheeman since 1989. They have four sons.

== Career ==
In 1986 Stheeman joined Deutsche Bank AG in Frankfurt. He subsequently worked as a Director in the Debt Capital Markets group of Deutsche Bank in London, leading relationships with sovereign issuers and official institutions.

In January 2003 Stheeman was appointed Chief Executive of the UK Debt Management Office (DMO), an executive agency of HM Treasury responsible for carrying out the UK Government's debt and cash management operations, including issuing gilts to raise long term finance for the government and operating in the money markets to manage the government’s cash flows. The DMO also oversees the statutory functions of the Commissioners for the Reduction of National Debt and the Public Works Loans Board.

As Chief Executive, Stheeman is accountable to Treasury ministers for advising on and delivering the UK Government’s cash financing requirements and the issuance of government bonds. Between 2003 and 2019 Stheeman raised £2 trillion of borrowing.

On 31 December 2015, Stheeman was knighted in the 2016 New Year Honours for services to UK Government Debt Management. He was appointed a Companion of the Order of the Bath in the New Year Honours 2008.

In September 2023, he announced that he would be stepping down as CEO of the DMO, after 21 years there. In an address to the Public Accounts Committee, he said that the reason he had stayed at the DMO for so long was that it was "arguably just about the most interesting job around".
