= Post Office Savings Bank Act 1954 =

Act of the Parliament of the United Kingdom

Post Office Savings Bank Act 1954 (Note: Section 28(1).)
- Act of Parliament
- Parliament of the United Kingdom
- Long title: An Act to consolidate the enactments relating to post office savings banks.
- Citation: 2 & 3 Eliz. 2. c. 62
- Territorial extent: England and Wales; Scotland; Ireland; Isle of Man; Channel Islands; (Note: Section 27.)

Dates
- Royal assent: 25 November 1954
- Commencement: 25 January 1954 (Note: Section 28(2).)
- Repealed: 12 June 1971
Other legislation
Amends	See § Repealed enactments
Repeals/revokes	See § Repealed enactments
Amended by	Statute Law Revision Act 1963; National Loans Act 1968; Income and Corporation Taxes Act 1970
Repealed by	National Savings Bank Act 1971
Relates to	Trustee Savings Banks Act 1954

Status: Repealed

Text of statute as originally enacted

The Post Office Savings Bank Act 1954 (2 & 3 Eliz. 2. c. 63) was an act of the Parliament of the United Kingdom that consolidated enactments related to post office savings banks in the United Kingdom and the British Isles.

The act was passed alongside the Trustee Savings Banks Act 1954 (2 & 3 Eliz. 2. c. 63), which made similar provisions for trustee savings banks in the United Kingdom and the British Isles.

== Provisions ==
=== Repealed enactments ===
Section 82(1) of the act repealed 23 enactments, listed in the schedule to the act.

Session and Chapter	Short Title	Extent of Repeal
9 Geo. 4. c. 92	Savings Bank Act 1828	The whole act except so far as relates to trustee savings banks.
3 & 4 Will. 4. c. 14	Savings Bank Act 1833	The whole act except so far as relates to trustee savings banks.
5 & 6 Will. 4. c. 57.	Savings Bank Act 1835	The whole act except so far as relates to trustee savings banks.
7 & 8 Vict. c. 83	Savings Bank Act 1844	The whole act.
22 & 23 Vict. c. 53	Savings Bank (Charitable Societies) Act 1859	The whole act.
24 & 25 Vict. c. 14	Post Office Savings Bank Act 1861	The whole act.
26 & 27 Vict. c. 14	Post Office Savings Bank Act 1863	Section one.
29 & 30 Vict. c. 5	Savings Bank Investment Act 1866	The whole act except so far as relates to trustee savings banks.
32 & 33 Vict. c. 39	Savings Bank Investment Act 1869	The whole act except so far as relates to trustee savings banks.
37 & 38 Vict. c. 73	Post Office Savings Bank Act 1874	The whole act.
39 & 40 Vict. c. 52	Savings Banks (Barristers) Act 1876	The whole act except so far as relates to trustee savings banks.
40 & 41 Vict. c. 13	Customs, Inland Revenue and Savings Banks Act 1877	Section fourteen. Sections one and three except so far as relates to trustee savings banks.
50 & 51 Vict. c. 40	Savings Banks Act 1887	Sections one and three except so far as relates to trustee savings banks. Section eight. Sections twelve and thirteen.
54 & 55 Vict. c. 21.	Savings Banks Act 1891	In section twelve, subsection (2) except so far as relates to trustee savings banks. Sections fifteen to nineteen except so far as relates to trustee savings banks.
4 Edw. 7. c. 8	Savings Banks Act 1904	Section two except so far as relates to trustee savings banks. Section nine except so far as relates to trustee savings banks. Section twelve. Sections thirteen to sixteen except so far as relates to trustee savings banks.
8 Edw. 7. c. 8	Post Office Savings Bank Act 1908	The whole act.
10 & 11 Geo. 5. c. 12	Savings Banks Act 1920	Section one so far as relates to post office savings banks. Sections three and four except so far as relates to trustee savings banks. Section six except so far as relates to trustee savings banks. In section ten, the first paragraph in subsection (2) and in subsection (3), the words "the Post Office savings bank and ".
19 & 20 Geo. 5. c. 27	Savings Banks Act 1929	Sections five, ten and thirteen except so far as relates to trustee savings banks. In section twenty, subsection (2) except so far as relates to trustee savings banks.
8 & 9 Geo. 6. c. 12	Northern Ireland (Miscellaneous Provisions) Act 1945	In section seven, subsection (2) except so far as relates to trustee savings banks.
10 & 11 Geo. 6. c. 35	Finance Act 1947	In section seventy-two, subsection (1).
11 & 12 Geo. 6. c. 39	Industrial Assurance and Friendly Societies Act 1948	In section nineteen, in subsection (5), in paragraph (a) the words " section twenty-seven of the Savings Bank Act 1828 ", and paragraph (b).
12 & 13 Geo. 6. c. 13	Savings Banks Act 1949	In section seven, subsection (2) except so far as relates to trustee savings banks.
15 & 16 Geo. 6 & 1 Eliz. 2. c. 34	Post Office and Telegraph (Money) Act 1952	Section two.

== Subsequent developments ==
The whole act was repealed by section 96(1) of, and the part I of schedule 3 to, the National Savings Bank Act 1971 (2 & 3 Eliz. 2. c. 63), which came into force on 12 June 1971.
