= Savings Bank Act 1835 =

Act of the Parliament of the United Kingdom

Savings Bank Act 1835 (Note: The citation of this act by this short title was authorised by section 1 of, and the first schedule to, the Short Titles Act 1896. Due to the repeal of those provisions it is now authorised by section 19(2) of the Interpretation Act 1978.)
- Act of Parliament
- Parliament of the United Kingdom
- Long title: An Act to extend to Scotland certain Provisions of an Act of the Ninth Year of His late Majesty, to consolidate and amend the Laws relating to Savings Banks; and to consolidate and amend the Laws relating to Savings Banks in Scotland.
- Citation: 5 & 6 Will. 4. c. 57
- Territorial extent: Scotland (Note: Section 5.)

Dates
- Royal assent: 9 September 1835
- Commencement: 9 September 1835 (Note: The Acts of Parliament (Commencement) Act 1793.)
- Repealed: 25 January 1955
Other legislation
Amends	Savings Bank Act 1828; Savings Bank Act 1833
Repeals/revokes	See § Repealed enactments
Amended by	Trustee Savings Banks Act 1863
Repealed by	Post Office Savings Bank Act 1954; Trustee Savings Banks Act 1954

Status: Repealed

Text of statute as originally enacted

The Savings Bank Act 1835 (5 & 6 Will. 4. c. 57) was an act of the Parliament of the United Kingdom that extended provisions of the Savings Bank Act 1828 to Scotland and consolidated enactments related to savings banks in Scotland.

== Provisions ==
Section 1 of the act extended the provisions of the Savings Bank Act 1828 (9 Geo. 4. c. 92) and the Savings Bank Act 1833 (3 & 4 Will. 4. c. 14) to Scotland. Section 3 allowed the trustees, managers or directors of a savings bank already established in Scotland to establish it under those acts by preparing, enrolling and depositing its rules. Section 4 provided that payments to the relatives of an intestate depositor were to be made according to the law of Scotland, and that confirmation under Scots law took the place of probate or letters of administration. Section 5 provided that the act extended to all savings banks established in Scotland under those acts, and that it was to be deemed a public act.

=== Repealed enactments ===
Section 2 of the act repealed 1 enactment, listed in that section. The provisions of the repealed act continued in force as to all savings banks established under it before the passing of the act, unless and until they conformed to and were established under the provisions of those acts.

Citation	Short title	Description	Extent of repeal
59 Geo. 3. c. 62	Savings Bank (Scotland) Act 1819	An Act for the Protection of Banks for Savings in Scotland.	So far as the act is applicable to any savings bank to be formed and established in Scotland after the passing of the act.

== Subsequent developments ==
The act was repealed, as far as it related to savings banks established under it, by section 1 of, and schedule A to, the Trustee Savings Banks Act 1863 (26 & 27 Vict. c. 87), which came into force on 20 November 1863.

The whole act, except so far as relates to trustee savings banks, was repealed by section 26(1) of, and the schedule to, the Post Office Savings Bank Act 1954 (2 & 3 Eliz. 2. c. 62), which came into force on 25 January 1955.

The whole act, so far as relates to trustee savings banks, was repealed by section 82(1) of, and the third schedule to, the Trustee Savings Banks Act 1954 (2 & 3 Eliz. 2. c. 63), which came into force on 25 January 1955.
