= Government Annuities Act 1853 =

Act of the Parliament of the United Kingdom

Government Annuities Act 1853 (Note: The citation of this act by this short title was authorised by section 1 of, and the first schedule to, the Short Titles Act 1896. Due to the repeal of those provisions it is now authorised by section 19(2) of the Interpretation Act 1978.)
- Act of Parliament
- Parliament of the United Kingdom
- Long title: An Act to consolidate and amend the Laws and to grant additional Facilities in relation to the Purchase of Government Annuities through the Medium of Saving Banks, and to make other Provisions in respect thereof.
- Citation: 16 & 17 Vict. c. 45
- Territorial extent: United Kingdom

Dates
- Royal assent: 4 August 1853
- Commencement: 10 October 1853 (Note: Section 1.)
- Repealed: 21 November 1929
Other legislation
| Amends | Savings Bank Act 1833; Savings Bank Act 1844 |
| Amended by | Greenwich Hospital Act 1872; Perjury Act 1911; Forgery Act 1913 |
| Repealed by | Government Annuities Act 1929 |

Status: Repealed

Text of statute as originally enacted

The Government Annuities Act 1853 (16 & 17 Vict. c. 45) was an act of the Parliament of the United Kingdom that consolidated enactments relating to government annuities in the United Kingdom.

== Provisions ==
Section 1 of the act repealed 2 enactments, listed in that section.

| Citation | Short title | Description | Extent of repeal |
|---|---|---|---|
| 3 & 4 Will. 4. c. 14 | Savings Bank Act 1833 | Act passed in the Third Year of the Reign of King William the Fourth, Chapter Fourteen. | As relates to the enabling Depositors in Savings Banks and others to purchase Government Annuities through the Medium of Savings Banks and Parochial Societies. |
| 7 & 8 Vict. c. 83 | Savings Bank Act 1844 | Another Act passed in the Seventh and Eighth Years of Her present Majesty, Chapter Eighty-three. | As relates to the Purchase of Government Annuities through the Medium of Savings Banks |

== Subsequent developments ==
The whole act was repealed by section 66(2) of, and part II of the second schedule to, the Government Annuities Act 1929 (19 & 20 Geo. 5. c. 29), which came into force on 21 November 1929.
