= Trustee Savings Banks Act 1981 =

Act of the Parliament of the United Kingdom

Trustee Savings Banks Act 1981 (Note: Section 57(1).)
- Act of Parliament
- Parliament of the United Kingdom
- Long title: An Act to consolidate the Trustee Savings Banks Acts 1969 to 1978, with amendments to give effect to recommendations of the Law Commission and the Scottish Law Commission.
- Citation: 1981 c. 65
- Territorial extent: United Kingdom; Isle of Man; Channel Islands; (Note: Section 57(3) extends the act to Northern Ireland. Section 56 extends the act to the Isle of Man and the Channel Islands.)

Dates
- Royal assent: 30 October 1981
- Commencement: 30 January 1982 (Note: Section 57(2).)

Other legislation
- Amends: See § Repealed enactments
- Repeals/revokes: See § Repealed enactments
- Amended by: Companies Consolidation (Consequential Provisions) Act 1985; Trustee Savings Banks Act 1985

Status: Partially repealed

Text of statute as originally enacted

Revised text of statute as amended

Text of the Trustee Savings Banks Act 1981 as in force today (including any amendments) within the United Kingdom, from legislation.gov.uk.

The Trustee Savings Banks Act 1981 (c. 65) is an act of the Parliament of the United Kingdom that consolidated enactments related to trustee savings banks in the United Kingdom, the Isle of Man, and the Channel Islands.

== Provisions ==
=== Repealed enactments ===
Section 55(3) of the act repealed 4 enactments, listed in schedule 8 to the act.

Enactments repealed by section 55(3)
Citation	Short title	Extent of repeal
1969 c. 50	Trustee Savings Banks Act 1969	The whole act.
1972 c. 41	Finance Act 1972	Section 133.
1976 c. 4	Trustee Savings Banks Act 1976	The whole act.
1978 c. 16	Trustee Savings Banks Act 1978	The whole act.

== Subsequent developments ==
The majority of the act was repealed by section 4(3) of, and schedule 4 to, the Trustee Savings Banks Act 1985, which provided for the reorganisation of trustee savings banks into companies incorporated under the Companies Acts. The Trustee Savings Banks Act 1985 (Appointed Day) (No. 2) Order 1986 (SI 1986/1220) repealed paragraph 10 of schedule 7 to the act, with effect from 20 July 1986. The Trustee Savings Banks Act 1985 (Appointed Day) (No. 4) Order 1986 (SI 1986/1223) repealed sections 1, 2, 3(1) and (2), 4, 5, 6(1), 7(3), (5) and (6), 8 to 11, 14, 15(1) to (8) and (11), 16(1), (3) and (4), 17, 18, 19(1) to (4), 20 to 22, 26 to 50, 52 and 55(1) and (3), and schedules 1, 4, 6 and 8, with effect from 21 July 1986, the date appointed as the vesting day for the reorganisation.
