= Trustee Savings Banks Act 1954 =

Act of the Parliament of the United Kingdom

Trustee Savings Banks Act 1954 (Note: Section 86(1).)
- Act of Parliament
- Parliament of the United Kingdom
- Long title: An Act to consolidate the enactments relating to trustee savings banks.
- Citation: 2 & 3 Eliz. 2. c. 63
- Territorial extent: England and Wales; Scotland; Ireland; Isle of Man; Channel Islands; (Note: Section 83(1) and section 85.)

Dates
- Royal assent: 25 November 1954
- Commencement: 25 January 1954 (Note: Section 86(2).)
- Repealed: 1 October 1969: Trustee Savings Banks Act 1969 (Commencement) Order 1969.
Other legislation
Amends	See § Repealed enactments
Repeals/revokes	See § Repealed enactments
Amended by	Statute Law Revision Act 1963; National Loans Act 1968; Family Law Reform Act 1969
Repealed by	Trustee Savings Banks Act 1969
Relates to	Post Office Savings Bank Act 1954

Status: Repealed

Text of statute as originally enacted

The Trustee Savings Banks Act 1954 (2 & 3 Eliz. 2. c. 63) was an act of the Parliament of the United Kingdom that consolidated enactments related to trustee savings banks in the United Kingdom and the British Isles. The act reproduced the law without amendment.

The act was passed alongside the Post Office Savings Bank Act 1954 (2 & 3 Eliz. 2. c. 62), which made similar provisions for post savings banks in the United Kingdom and the British Isles.

== Provisions ==
=== Repealed enactments ===
Section 82(1) of the act repealed 29 enactments, listed in the third schedule to the act.

Citation	Short title	Extent of repeal
9 Geo. 4. c. 92	Savings Bank Act 1828	The whole act so far as relates to trustee savings banks.
3 & 4 Will. 4. c. 14	Savings Bank Act 1833	The whole act so far as relates to trustee savings banks.
5 & 6 Will. 4. c. 57	Savings Bank Act 1835	The whole act so far as relates to trustee savings banks.
23 & 24 Vict. c. 137	National Debt Commissioners (Investments) Act 1860	The whole act.
26 & 27 Vict. c. 14	Post Office Savings Bank Act 1863	Sections two to six.
26 & 27 Vict. c. 23	Savings Bank Investment Act 1863	The whole act so far as relates to trustee savings banks.
26 & 27 Vict. c. 87	Trustee Savings Banks Act 1863	The whole act.
29 & 30 Vict. c. 5	Savings Bank Investment Act 1866	The whole act so far as relates to trustee savings banks.
32 & 33 Vict. c. 59	Savings Bank Investment Act 1869	The whole act so far as relates to trustee savings banks.
39 & 40 Vict. c. 52	Savings Banks (Barrier) Act 1876	The whole act so far as relates to trustee savings banks.
40 & 41 Vict. c. 13	Customs, Inland Revenue and Savings Banks Act 1877	Section fifteen. Section seventeen so far as relates to trustee savings banks.
43 & 44 Vict. c. 36	Savings Banks Act 1880	The whole act.
50 & 51 Vict. c. 40	Savings Banks Act 1887	Section one so far as relates to trustee savings banks. Section two. Section three so far as relates to trustee savings banks.
50 & 51 Vict. c. 47	Trustee Savings Banks Act 1887	The whole act.
51 & 52 Vict. c. 15	National Debt (Supplemental) Act 1888	Section five.
54 & 55 Vict. c. 21	Savings Banks Act 1891	Sections one to ten. In section twelve, subsection (1) and, so far as relates to trustee savings banks, subsection (2). Sections fifteen to nineteen so far as relates to trustee savings banks.
3 Edw. 7. c. 46	Revenue Act 1903	In section sixteen in subsection (1), the words " of a savings bank or ".
4 Edw. 7. c. 8	Savings Banks Act 1904	Section one. Section two so far as relates to trustee savings banks. Sections four to seven. Section nine so far as relates to trustee savings banks. Sections thirteen to sixteen so far as relates to trustee savings banks.
5 & 6 Geo. 5. c. 93	War Loan (Supplemental Provisions) Act 1915	Section ten. In section eleven the words from " and so far " in the second place where they occur to the end of the section.
8 & 9 Geo. 5. c. 4	Trustee Savings Banks Act 1918	The whole act.
10 & 11 Geo. 5. c. 12	Savings Banks Act 1920	Section one so far as relates to trustee savings banks. Section two. Sections three and four so far as relates to trustee savings banks. Section six so far as relates to trustee savings banks. In section ten the second paragraph in subsection (2) and, in subsection (3), the words " as regards any trustee savings bank, the trustees of the bank ".
19 & 20 Geo. 5. c. 27	Savings Banks Act 1929	Sections one to four. Section five so far as relates to trustee savings banks. Sections six to nine. Sections ten and thirteen so far as relates to trustee savings banks. Sections fourteen to nineteen. In section twenty, subsection (2) so far as relates to trustee savings banks.
24 & 25 Geo. 5. c. 37	Trustee Savings Banks (Special Investments) Act 1934	The whole act.
8 & 9 Geo. 6. c. 12.	Northern Ireland (Miscellaneous Provisions) Act 1945	In section seven, subsections (1) and (3) and, so far as relates to trustee savings banks, subsection (2).
9 & 10 Geo. 6. c. 26.	Emergency Laws (Transitional Provisions) Act 1946	In the Second Schedule, the amendments of the enactments relating to trustee savings banks.
10 & 11 Geo. 6. c. 6	Trustee Savings Banks Act 1947	The whole act.
10 & 11 Geo. 6. c. 35.	Finance Act 1947	In section seventy-two, subsections (2) and (3).
11 & 12 Geo. 6. c. 39.	Industrial Assurance and Friendly Societies Act 1948	In section nineteen, in subsection (5), in paragraph (d) the words from " and section thirty-two " to the end of the paragraph.
12, 13 & 14 Geo. 6. c. 13	Savings Banks Act 1949	Sections one to six. In section seven, subsections (1) and (3) and, so far as relates to trustee savings banks, subsection (2). Sections eight to fourteen. Section sixteen. In section seventeen, subsection (2).

== Subsequent developments ==
The whole act was repealed by section 96(1) of, and the part I of schedule 3 to, the Trustee Savings Banks Act 1969 (2 & 3 Eliz. 2. c. 63), which came into force on 1 October 1969.
