= Savings Bank Act 1828 =

Act of the Parliament of the United Kingdom

Savings Bank Act 1828 (Note: The citation of this act by this short title was authorised by section 1 of, and the first schedule to, the Short Titles Act 1896. Due to the repeal of those provisions it is now authorised by section 19(2) of the Interpretation Act 1978.)
- Act of Parliament
- Parliament of the United Kingdom
- Long title: An Act to consolidate and amend the Laws relating to Savings Banks.
- Citation: 9 Geo. 4. c. 92
- Territorial extent: England and Wales; Scotland; Ireland; Guernsey; Jersey; Isle of Man; (Note: Section 57. Extended by section 25 of the Savings Bank Act 1833 (3 & 4 Will. 4. c. 14) and section 1 of the Savings Bank Act 1835 (5 & 6 Will. 4. c. 57).)

Dates
- Royal assent: 28 July 1828
- Commencement: 20 November 1828 (Note: Section 1.)
- Repealed: 25 January 1955
Other legislation
Repeals/revokes	Savings Banks (Ireland) Act 1817; Savings Bank (England) Act 1817; Savings Bank (England) Act 1818
Amended by	Savings Bank Act 1833; Trustee Savings Banks Act 1863
Repealed by	Post Office Savings Bank Act 1954; Trustee Savings Banks Act 1954

Status: Repealed

Text of statute as originally enacted

The Savings Bank Act 1828 (9 Geo. 4. c. 92) was an act of the Parliament of the United Kingdom that consolidated and amended enactments related to savings banks in England and Ireland.

== Provisions ==
=== Repealed enactments ===
Section 1 of the act repealed 5 enactments, listed in that section, from 20 November 1828.

- Savings Banks (Ireland) Act 1817 (57 Geo. 3. c. 105)
- Savings Bank (England) Act 1817 (57 Geo. 3. c. 140)
- Savings Bank (England) Act 1818 (58 Geo. 3. c. 48)
- Savings Banks (England) Act 1820 (1 Geo. 4. c. 83)
- Savings Banks Act 1824 (5 Geo. 4. c. 62)

== Subsequent developments ==
Savings Bank Act 1833
- Act of Parliament
- Parliament of the United Kingdom
- Long title: An Act to enable Depositors in Savings Banks, and others, to purchase Government Annuities through the Medium of Savings Banks; and to amend an Act of the Ninth Year of His late Majesty, to consolidate and amend the Laws relating to Savings Banks.
- Citation: 3 & 4 Will. 4. c. 14
- Territorial extent: England and Wales; Scotland; Ireland; Guernsey; Jersey; Isle of Man; (Note: Section 35.)

Dates
- Royal assent: 10 June 1833
- Commencement: 20 May 1833
- Repealed: 25 January 1955
Other legislation
Amends	Savings Banks Act 1828
Amended by	Savings Bank Act 1835; Savings Bank Act 1844; Government Annuities Act 1853; Trustee Savings Banks Act 1863
Repealed by	Post Office Savings Bank Act 1954; Trustee Savings Banks Act 1954

Status: Repealed

Text of statute as originally enacted

The act was subsequently amended and extended to Guernsey, Jersey and the Isle of Man by the Savings Bank Act 1833 (3 & 4 Will. 4. c. 14).

The act was subsequently amended and extended to Scotland by section 1 of the Savings Bank Act 1835 (5 & 6 Will. 4. c. 57).

The whole act, except so far as relates to trustee savings banks, was repealed by section 26(1) of, and the schedule to, the Post Office Savings Bank Act 1954 (2 & 3 Eliz. 2. c. 62), which came into force on 25 January 1955.

The whole act, so far as relates to trustee savings banks, was repealed by section 82(1) of, and the third schedule to, the Trustee Savings Banks Act 1954 (2 & 3 Eliz. 2. c. 63), which came into force on 25 January 1955.
