= Trustee Savings Banks Act 1969 =

Act of the Parliament of the United Kingdom

Trustee Savings Banks Act 1969 (Note: Section 100(1).)
- Act of Parliament
- Parliament of the United Kingdom
- Long title: An Act to consolidate the Trustee Savings Banks Acts 1954 to 1968, with amendments to give effect to recommendations of the Law Commission and the Scottish Law Commission.
- Citation: 1969 c. 50
- Territorial extent: United Kingdom (Note: Section 97(1).)

Dates
- Royal assent: 25 July 1969
- Commencement: 1 October 1969 (Note: Section 100(2). The Trustee Savings Banks Act 1969 (Commencement) Order 1969 (SI 1969/1285).)
- Repealed: 30 January 1982
Other legislation
Repealed by	Trustee Savings Banks Act 1981

Status: Repealed

Text of statute as originally enacted

The Trustee Savings Banks Act 1969 (c. 50) was an act of the Parliament of the United Kingdom that consolidated enactments related to trustee savings banks in the United Kingdom.

== Provisions ==
=== Repealed enactments ===
Section 96(1) of the act repealed 7 enactments and revoked 1 instrument, listed in parts I and II of schedule 3 to the act, respectively.

Part I – Enactments repealed by section 96(1)
Citation	Short title	Extent of repeal
2 & 3 Eliz. 2. c. 63	Trustee Savings Banks Act 1954	The whole act.
3 & 4 Eliz. 2. c. 12	Trustee Savings Banks (Pensions) Act 1955	The whole act.
6 & 7 Eliz. 2. c. 8	Trustee Savings Banks Act 1958	The whole act.
9 & 10 Eliz. 2. c. 62	Trustee Investments Act 1961	In Schedule 4, in paragraph 4(1), the words from the beginning to "trustee and" and the words "and subsection (1) of section twenty of the Trustee Savings Banks Act 1954", paragraph 4(2), in paragraph 4(3), the words "and subsection (1) of section twenty-four of the Trustee Savings Banks Act 1954" and, in paragraph 5, the words "and the Trustee Savings Banks Act 1954" and the words from "or ordinary" to "bank".
1964 c. 4	Trustee Savings Banks Act 1964	The whole act.
1965 c. 32	Administration of Estates (Small Payments) Act 1965	In Schedule 1, in Part II, the entry relating to the Trustee Savings Banks Act 1954.
1968 c. 6	Trustee Savings Banks Act 1968	The whole act.

Part II – Order revoked by section 96(1)
Citation	Title	Extent of revocation
SI 1955/842	Trustee Savings Banks (Pensions) Order 1955	Article 2.

== Subsequent developments ==
The whole act was repealed by section 55(3) of, and schedule 8 to, the Trustee Savings Banks Act 1981, which came into force on 30 January 1982.
