= Debt Management Office (United Kingdom) =

Agency of the British government

United Kingdom Debt Management Office
- Type: Government agency
- Region served: United Kingdom
- Chief Executive: Jessica Pulay
- Parent organisation: HM Treasury
- Staff: 113 (2021)
- Website: www.dmo.gov.uk

The Debt Management Office (DMO) of the United Kingdom is the executive agency responsible for debt and cash management for the UK Government, lending to local authorities and managing certain public sector funds.

The office was established on 1 April 1998, when responsibility for government wholesale sterling debt issuance was transferred from the Bank of England to the DMO following the transfer of operational responsibility for setting official United Kingdom interest rates from HM Treasury to the Bank of England in May 1997.

The DMO is legally and constitutionally part of HM Treasury but operates at arm's length as an executive agency. The minister ultimately responsible for the agency is the Chancellor of the Exchequer, who sets its policy and financial framework, while operational decisions on debt and cash management and the day-to-day management of the office are delegated to the DMO's Chief Executive.

Since 2024 the Chief Executive has been Jessica Pulay, who succeeded Sir Robert Stheeman after more than two decades in the role.

== History ==
The DMO was established as an executive agency of HM Treasury on 1 April 1998, when responsibility for government wholesale sterling debt issuance was transferred from the Bank of England to the new body. The change formed part of wider reforms announced in 1997, under which the Bank was given operational independence for setting official United Kingdom interest rates and ceased to be responsible for government debt management, in order to separate debt management from monetary policy and increase transparency.

The DMO’s first full year of operation in 1998–99 focused on implementing the government’s debt management remit and establishing operational systems. Gilt market responsibilities were transferred from the Bank of England, the development of auction and conversion procedures, and the phased introduction of Exchequer cash management operations.

In 2021 HM Treasury carried out a tailored review of the DMO as part of the government’s programme of reviewing arm’s-length bodies. The review concluded that the DMO continued to perform strongly in carrying out its debt and cash management functions and recommended updating its governance arrangements, including establishing an advisory board and recognising the office as a “Model 2” executive agency requiring a high degree of independence and autonomy.

== Responsibilities ==
The DMO is responsible for carrying out the government's debt management policy of minimising financing costs over the long term, taking account of risk. It is also responsible for minimising the cost of offsetting the government's net cash flows over time, in each case within a risk framework approved by ministers.

In order to deliver these objectives, the DMO implements the government's annual financing remit by issuing sterling-denominated government securities, primarily gilts, and by managing the government's wholesale sterling debt portfolio. It conducts operations in the gilt market and in short-term money markets in line with forecasts of the Exchequer's cash position, with the aim of ensuring that the government can meet its daily cash needs while managing cost and risk.

The DMO operates the Public Works Loan Board lending facility on behalf of HM Treasury. Through this facility it provides loans from the National Loans Fund to local authorities and certain other bodies, within a policy framework set by HM Treasury, primarily to finance capital projects.

Within the DMO, the statutory functions of the Commissioners for the Reduction of the National Debt are carried out by the Commissioners for the Reduction of the National Debt (CRND). CRND's main function is the investment and management of a range of government and public sector funds, and it administers donations and bequests made for the specific purpose of reducing the United Kingdom national debt.

== Governance and organisation ==
The DMO is an executive agency of HM Treasury. The Chancellor of the Exchequer is the minister ultimately responsible for the agency and sets its overall policy and financial framework, while operational decisions on debt and cash management and the day-to-day management of the office are delegated to the DMO's Chief Executive. The Chief Executive acts as the agency's Accounting Officer and is accountable to Parliament for the regularity, propriety and value for money of its operations.

The office is based in the City of London and has a relatively small staff, numbering just over one hundred people. Its work is organised into teams responsible for policy, markets, risk management and corporate support functions.

== Operations and market role ==
The DMO implements the government's annual financing remit, which is set by HM Treasury and published alongside the Budget and other fiscal policy documents. Within this framework it is responsible for deciding the pattern of gilt and Treasury bill issuance, subject to any constraints set by ministers, and for ensuring that the government's net cash requirements are met in a way that is consistent with the debt management and cash management objectives.

In the gilt market the DMO conducts sales of sterling government bonds primarily through auctions. These auctions are held according to published calendars and are open to the DMO's approved primary dealers, known as gilt-edged market makers (GEMMs). For some long-dated conventional and index-linked gilts the DMO also uses syndicated offerings, in which a syndicate of banks arranges and distributes a large transaction to investors, and it may use smaller "mini-tenders" to provide additional flexibility in meeting the financing remit.

== See also ==
- United Kingdom national debt
- Government debt
