= Commissioners for the Reduction of the National Debt =

Statutory body overview
- Formed: 1786; 240 years ago
- Jurisdiction: United Kingdom
- Headquarters: London, EC3 United Kingdom
- Statutory body executive: Paul Canty, Comptroller General
- Parent Statutory body: UK Debt Management Office
- Website: www.dmo.gov.uk

The Commissioners for the Reduction of the National Debt (CRND) is a statutory body of the UK Government, whose main function is the investment and management of government funds. The current Comptroller General is Paul Canty.

== History ==
National Debt Reduction Act 1786 (Note: The citation of this act by this short title was authorised by section 1 of, and the first schedule to, the Short Titles Act 1896. Due to the repeal of those provisions it is now authorised by section 19(2) of the Interpretation Act 1978.)
- Act of Parliament
- Parliament of Great Britain
- Long title: An Act for vesting certain Sums in Commissioners at the End of every Quarter of a Year, to be by them applied to the Reduction of the National Debt.
- Citation: 26 Geo. 3. c. 31
- Territorial extent: Great Britain

Dates
- Royal assent: 26 May 1786
- Commencement: 24 January 1786 (Note: Start of session.)
Other legislation
Amended by	Life Annuities Act 1808; Statute Law Revision Act 1871; Statute Law Revision Act 1888; Bank of England Act 1998
Relates to	Trustee Savings Banks Act 1863

Status: Amended

Text of statute as originally enacted

Revised text of statute as amended

Text of the Commissioners for the Reduction of the National Debt as in force today (including any amendments) within the United Kingdom, from legislation.gov.uk.

The CRND was established by the National Debt Reduction Act 1786 (26 Geo. 3. c. 31), and was originally a non-ministerial government department, also known as the National Debt Office.

The 1786 act provided that the Commissioners were to be the Speaker of the House of Commons, the Chancellor of the Exchequer, the Master of the Rolls, the Accountant-General of the Court of Chancery and the governor and deputy governor of the Bank of England. The Life Annuities Act 1808 provided that the Chief Baron of the Court of Exchequer (or, in his absence, any of the Barons of the Court of Exchequer) was also to be a Commissioner; the Chief Baron was replaced by the Lord Chief Justice by the Supreme Court of Judicature Act 1881. The Paymaster General replaced the Accountant-General of the Court of Chancery by virtue of the Court of Chancery (Funds) Act 1872 (35 & 36 Vict. c. 44), and was in turn replaced by the Accountant-General of the Supreme Court. The most recent change in composition has been as a result of the Bank of England Act 1998, which provided for additional deputy governors of the Bank to be Commissioners.

Meetings of the Commissioners were at first held regularly, usually at the home of the Chancellor, but the last recorded business meeting took place on 12 October 1860. The reason for the sudden cessation is unknown, no hint being obtainable from the minutes, but since then the day-to-day decisions have been delegated to the Comptroller General and the Assistant Comptroller, who are civil servants, but are appointed by and act on behalf of the Commissioners. On the comparatively rare occasions when it is necessary for a fundamental policy matter to be put to the Commissioners for a decision, it is referred to the Chancellor of the Exchequer, the Governor and the Deputy Governors of the Bank of England, who together constitute a quorum and are sometimes referred to as the "active" Commissioners. In practice the only references made to them are when it is necessary to make formal appointments, for example of Attorneys at the Bank of England and of the Comptroller General and the Assistant Comptroller. However, the Commissioners did reconvene, at the Chancellor's invitation, on 15 February 2016, on which occasion the DMO's Chief Executive was officially appointed as the Government Broker, a formal title previously conferred on the senior partner of the stockbrokers Mullens & Co., up until 1986.

The statutory functions of CRND have been carried out within the UK Debt Management Office since July 2002.

== Operations ==
The CRND manages the investment portfolios of a number of government and public bodies including HM Revenue & Customs (National Insurance Fund), National Savings and Investments (National Savings Bank Fund), HM Courts and Tribunals Service (Court Funds Investment Account), the Department for Culture, Media and Sport and the (National Lottery Distribution Fund). It also manages some residual operations relating to the National Debt including donations and bequests and the 3.5 per cent Conversion Loan Sinking Fund.
