= List of acts of the Parliament of the United Kingdom from 1835 =

This is a complete list of acts of the Parliament of the United Kingdom for the year 1835.

Note that the first parliament of the United Kingdom was held in 1801; parliaments between 1707 and 1800 were either parliaments of Great Britain or of Ireland). For acts passed up until 1707, see the list of acts of the Parliament of England and the list of acts of the Parliament of Scotland. For acts passed from 1707 to 1800, see the list of acts of the Parliament of Great Britain. See also the list of acts of the Parliament of Ireland.

For acts of the devolved parliaments and assemblies in the United Kingdom, see the list of acts of the Scottish Parliament, the list of acts of the Northern Ireland Assembly, and the list of acts and measures of Senedd Cymru; see also the list of acts of the Parliament of Northern Ireland.

The number shown after each act's title is its chapter number. Acts passed before 1963 are cited using this number, preceded by the year(s) of the reign during which the relevant parliamentary session was held; thus the Union with Ireland Act 1800 is cited as "39 & 40 Geo. 3 c. 67", meaning the 67th act passed during the session that started in the 39th year of the reign of George III and which finished in the 40th year of that reign. Note that the modern convention is to use Arabic numerals in citations (thus "41 Geo. 3" rather than "41 Geo. III"). Acts of the last session of the Parliament of Great Britain and the first session of the Parliament of the United Kingdom are both cited as "41 Geo. 3". Acts passed from 1963 onwards are simply cited by calendar year and chapter number.

All modern acts have a short title, e.g. the Local Government Act 2003. Some earlier acts also have a short title given to them by later acts, such as by the Short Titles Act 1896.

== 5 & 6 Will. 4 ==
The first session of the 12th Parliament of the United Kingdom, which met from 19 February 1835 until 10 September 1835.

This session was also traditionally cited as 5 & 6 Gul. 4, 5 & 6 Wm. 4 or 5 & 6 W. 4.

=== Public general acts ===
Short title	Citation	Royal assent
Long title
Execution of Criminals, Chester Act 1835 (repealed)	5 & 6 Will. 4. c. 1	20 March 1835
An Act to explain an Act of the First Year of His present Majesty, (Note: Law Terms Act 1830 (11 Geo. 4 & 1 Will. 4. c. 70)) for the more effectual Administration of Justice in England and Wales, so far as relates to the Execution of Criminals in the County of Chester. (Repealed by Statute Law Revision Act 1874 (37 & 38 Vict. c. 35))
Newspapers Printers Relief Act 1835 (repealed)	5 & 6 Will. 4. c. 2	20 March 1835
An Act to amend an Act of the Thirty-eighth Year of King George the Third, (Note: Newspaper Publication Act 1798 (38 Geo. 3. c. 78)) for preventing the Mischiefs arising from the printing and publishing Newspapers, and Papers of a like Nature, by Persons not known, and for regulating the Printing and Publication of such Papers in other respects; and to discontinue certain Actions commenced under the Provisions of the said Act. (Repealed by Stamp Duties on Newspapers Act 1836 (6 & 7 Will. 4. c. 76))
Supply Act 1835 (repealed)	5 & 6 Will. 4. c. 3	20 March 1835
An Act to apply certain Sums to the Service of the Year One thousand eight hundred and thirty-five. (Repealed by Statute Law Revision Act 1874 (37 & 38 Vict. c. 35))
Exchequer Bills Act 1835 (repealed)	5 & 6 Will. 4. c. 4	20 March 1835
An Act for raising the Sum of Fifteen Millions by Exchequer Bills, for the Service of the Year One thousand eight hundred and thirty-five. (Repealed by Statute Law Revision Act 1874 (37 & 38 Vict. c. 35))
Mutiny Act 1835 (repealed)	5 & 6 Will. 4. c. 5	13 April 1835
An Act for punishing Mutiny and Desertion, and for the better Payment of the Army and their Quarters. (Repealed by Statute Law Revision Act 1874 (37 & 38 Vict. c. 35))
Governor-General, etc., Indemnity, etc., India Act 1835 (repealed)	5 & 6 Will. 4. c. 6	13 April 1835
An Act to indemnify the Governor General and other Persons in respect of certain Acts done in the Administration of the Government of the British Territories in the East Indies subsequent to the Twenty-second Day of April One thousand eight hundred and thirty-four, and to make those Acts valid. (Repealed by Statute Law Revision Act 1874 (37 & 38 Vict. c. 35))
Marine Mutiny Act 1835 (repealed)	5 & 6 Will. 4. c. 7	13 April 1835
An Act for the Regulation of His Majesty's Royal Marine Forces while on Shore. (Repealed by Statute Law Revision Act 1874 (37 & 38 Vict. c. 35))
Declarations Act 1835 (repealed)	5 & 6 Will. 4. c. 8	12 June 1835
An Act for the more effectual Abolition of Oaths and Affirmations taken and made in various Departments of the State, and to substitute Declarations in lieu thereof, and for the more entire, Suppression of voluntary and extra-judicial Oaths and Affidavits. (Repealed by Statutory Declarations Act 1835 (5 & 6 Will. 4. c. 62))
Supply (No. 2) Act 1835 (repealed)	5 & 6 Will. 4. c. 9	17 June 1835
An Act to apply a Sum of Eight Millions, out of the Consolidated Fund, to the Service of the Year One thousand eight hundred and thirty-five. (Repealed by Statute Law Revision Act 1874 (37 & 38 Vict. c. 35))
Dominica Importation Act 1835 (repealed)	5 & 6 Will. 4. c. 10	3 July 1835
An Act to allow, until the Twenty-eighth Day of July One thousand eight hundred and thirty-five, the Importation of certain Articles, Duty-free, into the Island of Dominica, and to indemnify the Governor and others for having permitted the Importation of such Articles Duty-free. (Repealed by Statute Law Revision Act 1874 (37 & 38 Vict. c. 35))
Indemnity Act 1835 (repealed)	5 & 6 Will. 4. c. 11	3 July 1835
An Act to indemnify such Persons in the United Kingdom as have omitted to qualify themselves for Offices and Employments, and for extending the Time limited for those Purposes respectively until the Twenty-fifth Day of March One thousand eight hundred and thirty-six; to permit such Persons in Great Britain as have omitted to make and file Affidavits of the Execution of Indentures of Clerks to Attornies and Solicitors to make and file the same on or before the First Day of Hilary Term One thousand eight hundred and thirty-six; and to allow Persons to make and file such Affidavits, although the Persons, whom they served shall have neglected to take out their Annual Certificates. (Repealed by Promissory Oaths Act 1871 (34 & 35 Vict. c. 48))
Sugar Duties and Exchequer Bills Act 1835 (repealed)	5 & 6 Will. 4. c. 12	3 July 1835
An Act for continuing to His Majesty, until the Fifth Day of July One thousand eight hundred and thirty-six, certain Duties on Sugar imported into the United Kingdom, for the Service of the Year One thousand eight hundred and thirty-five. (Repealed by Statute Law Revision Act 1874 (37 & 38 Vict. c. 35))
Isle of Man Importation Act 1835 (repealed)	5 & 6 Will. 4. c. 13	3 July 1835
An Act to regulate the Importation of Corn into the Isle of Man. (Repealed by Duties on Corn Act 1842 (5 & 6 Vict. c. 14))
Western Australia Government Act 1835 (repealed)	5 & 6 Will. 4. c. 14	3 July 1835
An Act to continue to the Thirty-first Day of December One thousand eight hundred and thirty-six, and from thence to the End of the then next Session of Parliament, an Act of the Tenth Year of His late Majesty's Reign, (Note: Government of Western Australia Act 1829 (10 Geo. 4. c. 22)) for providing for the Government of His Majesty's Settlements in Western Australia on the Western Coast of New Holland. (Repealed by Statute Law Revision Act 1874 (37 & 38 Vict. c. 35))
Soap Duty Allowances Act 1835 (repealed)	5 & 6 Will. 4. c. 15	21 July 1835
An Act to continue until the Thirty-first Day of May One thousand eight hundred and thirty-eight, and to the End of the then next Session of Parliament, the Allowances of the Duty of Excise on Soap used in certain Manufactures. (Repealed by Statute Law Revision Act 1874 (37 & 38 Vict. c. 35))
Chancery (Ireland) Act 1835 (repealed)	5 & 6 Will. 4. c. 16	30 July 1835
An Act for altering and amending the Law regarding Commitments by Courts of Equity for Contempts, and the taking Bills pro Confesso, in Ireland. (Repealed by Judicature (Northern Ireland) Act 1978 (c. 23))
Infants' Property (Ireland) Act 1835 (repealed)	5 & 6 Will. 4. c. 17	30 July 1835
An Act to extend to Ireland certain Provisions of an Act made and passed in the First Year of His present Majesty's Reign, intituled "An Act for consolidating and amending the Laws relating to Property belonging to Infants, Femes Covert, Lunatics, and Persons of unsound Mind." (Note: Infants' Property Act 1830 (11 Geo. 4 & 1 Will. 4. c. 65)) (Repealed by Lunacy Regulation (Ireland) Act 1871 (34 & 35 Vict. c. 22), Statute Law Revision Act 1874 (37 & 38 Vict. c. 35), Statute Law Revision (No. 2) Act 1888 (51 & 52 Vict. c. 57), Statute Law Revision (No. 2) Act 1890 (53 & 54 Vict. c. 51) and Statute Law Revision Act (Northern Ireland) 1954 (c. 35 (N.I.)))
Turnpike Tolls Act 1835 (repealed)	5 & 6 Will. 4. c. 18	30 July 1835
An Act to exempt Carriages carrying Manure from Toll. (Repealed by Statute Law (Repeals) Act 1981 (c. 19))
Merchant Seamen Act 1835 (repealed)	5 & 6 Will. 4. c. 19	30 July 1835
An Act to amend and consolidate the Laws relating to the Merchant Seamen of the United Kingdom, and for forming and maintaining a Register of all the Men engaged in that Service. (Repealed by Merchant Shipping Repeal Act 1854 (17 & 18 Vict. c. 120))
Stamps and Taxes Act 1835 (repealed)	5 & 6 Will. 4. c. 20	30 July 1835
An Act to consolidate certain Offices in the Collection of the Revenues of Stamps and Taxes, and to amend the Laws relating thereto. (Repealed by Inland Revenue Regulation Act 1890 (53 & 54 Vict. c. 21))
Shrewsbury to Bangor Road Act 1835 (repealed)	5 & 6 Will. 4. c. 21	30 July 1835
An Act to amend and alter an Act of the Fifty-ninth Year of His late Majesty King George the Third, (Note: Shrewsbury to Holyhead Roads Act 1819 (59 Geo. 3. c. 30)) for vesting in Commissioners the Line of Road from Shrewsbury in the County of Salop to Bangor Ferry in the County of Carnarvon; and for discharging the Trustees under several Acts of the Seventeenth, (Note: Wilts and Somerset Roads Act 1777 (17 Geo. 3. c. 99)) Twenty eighth, (Note: Montgomery Salop and Denbigh Roads Act 1788 (28 Geo. 3. c. 96)) Thirty-sixth, (Note: Bale and Dolgelly Roads Act 1796 (36 Geo. 3. c. 147)) Forty-first, (Note: Welsh Gate and Cotton Hill Roads Act 1801 (41 Geo. 3. (U.K.). c. cxxii)) Forty-second, (Note: Bangor Ferry and Pentre Voelas Road Act 1802 (42 Geo. 3. c. li)) Forty-seventh, (Note: Roads in Salop., Denbigh and Merioneth Act 1807 (47 Geo. 3 Sess. 2. c. xii)) and Fiftieth Years (Note: Roads in Carnarvon and Denbigh Act 1810 (50 Geo. 3. c. lii)) of His then present Majesty, from the future Repair and Maintenance thereof, and for repealing so much of the said Acts as affects the said Line of Road. (Repealed by Annual Turnpike Acts Continuance Act 1884 (47 & 48 Vict. c. 52), Shrewsbury and Holyhead Road (Anglesey and Carnarvon) Act 1890 (53 & 54 Vict. c. clxxxv) and Statute Law (Repeals) Act 2013 (c. 2))
Lunatics Act 1835 (repealed)	5 & 6 Will. 4. c. 22	21 August 1835
An Act to continue for Three Years, and from thence to the End of the then next Session of Parliament, Two Acts of the Second and Third Year (Note: Insane Persons (England) Act 1832 (2 & 3 Will. 4. c. 107)) and the Third and Fourth Year (Note: Lunatics (England) Act 1833 (3 & 4 Will. 4. c. 64)) of His present Majesty, relating to the Care and Treatment of Insane Persons in England. (Repealed by Lunacy Act 1845 (8 & 9 Vict. c. 100))
Loan Societies and Friendly Societies Act 1835 (repealed)	5 & 6 Will. 4. c. 23	21 August 1835
An Act for the Establishment of Loan Societies in England and Wales; and to extend the Provisions of the Friendly Societies Acts to the Islands of Guernsey, Jersey, and Man. (Repealed by Statute Law Revision Act 1874 (37 & 38 Vict. c. 35))
Naval Enlistment Act 1835 (repealed)	5 & 6 Will. 4. c. 24	21 August 1835
An Act for the Encouragement of the voluntary Enlistment of Seamen, and to make Regulations for more effectually manning His Majesty's Navy. (Repealed by Naval Enlistment Act 1853 (16 & 17 Vict. c. 69), Admiralty, &c. Acts Repeal Act 1865 (28 & 29 Vict. c. 112), Statute Law Revision Act 1874 (37 & 38 Vict. c. 35), Statute Law Revision (No. 2) Act 1888 (51 & 52 Vict. c. 57), Statute Law Revision (No. 2) Act 1890 (53 & 54 Vict. c. 51), Naval Discipline Act 1957 (5 & 6 Eliz. 2. c. 53), Armed Forces Act 1966 (c. 45) and Statute Law (Repeals) Act 1969 (c. 52))
Post Office Act 1835 (repealed)	5 & 6 Will. 4. c. 25	21 August 1835
An Act to extend the Accommodation by the Post to and from Foreign Parts, and for other Purposes relating to the Post Office. (Repealed by Post Office (Repeal of Laws) Act 1837 (7 Will. 4 & 1 Vict. c. 32))
Assizes (Ireland) Act 1835 (repealed)	5 & 6 Will. 4. c. 26	21 August 1835
An Act for the Appointment of convenient Places for the holding of Assizes in Ireland. (Repealed by Judicature (Northern Ireland) Act 1978 (c. 23))
Linen Manufactures (Ireland) Act 1835 or the Linen Manufacturers (Ireland) Act 1835 (repealed)	5 & 6 Will. 4. c. 27	21 August 1835
An Act to continue and amend certain Regulations for the Linen and Hempen Manufactures in Ireland. (Repealed for Northern Ireland by Statute Law Revision Act (Northern Ireland) 1954 (c. 35 (N.I.)))
Declarations, etc., to be Taken by Sheriffs Act 1835 or the Sheriffs' Declaration Act 1835 (repealed)	5 & 6 Will. 4. c. 28	21 August 1835
An Act for removing Doubts as to the Declaration to be made and Oaths to be taken by Persons appointed to the Office of Sheriff of any City or Town, being a County of itself. (Repealed by Promissory Oaths Act 1871 (34 & 35 Vict. c. 48))
Bankruptcy Act 1835 (repealed)	5 & 6 Will. 4. c. 29	21 August 1835
An Act for investing in Government Securities a Portion of the Cash lying unemployed in the Bank of England belonging to Bankrupts Estates, and applying the Interest thereon in discharge of the Expences of the Court of Bankruptcy, and for the Relief of the Suitors in the said Court; and for removing Doubts as to the Extent of the Powers of the Court of Review and of the Subdivision Courts. (Repealed by Bankruptcy Repeal and Insolvent Court Act 1869 (32 & 33 Vict. c. 83))
Vacant Ecclesiastical Dignities, etc. Act 1835 (repealed)	5 & 6 Will. 4. c. 30	21 August 1835
An Act for protecting the Revenues of vacant Ecclesiastical Dignities, Prebends, Canonries, and Benefices without Cure of Souls, and for preventing the Lapse thereof, during the pending Inquiries respecting the State of the Established Church in England and Wales. (Repealed by Statute Law Revision Act 1874 (37 & 38 Vict. c. 35))
Roads (Ireland) Act 1835 (repealed)	5 & 6 Will. 4. c. 31	21 August 1835
An Act to give Effect and Validity to certain Contracts and Presentments tor repairing and keeping in repair certain Public Roads in Ireland and the Sureties entered into for the Execution thereof. (Repealed by Statute Law Revision Act 1874 (37 & 38 Vict. c. 35))
Tea Duties Act 1835 (repealed)	5 & 6 Will. 4. c. 32	21 August 1835
An Act to impose certain Duties on Tea. (Repealed by Statute Law Revision Act 1861 (24 & 25 Vict. c. 101))
Removal of Indictments into King's Bench Act 1835 (repealed)	5 & 6 Will. 4. c. 33	21 August 1835
An Act for preventing the vexatious Removal of Indictments into the Court of Kings Bench; and for extending the Provisions of an Act of the Fifth Year of King William and Queen Mary, (Note: Quarter Sessions Delays Act 1694 (5 & 6 Will. & Mar. c. 11)) for preventing Delays at the Quarter Sessions of the Peace, to other Indictments; and for extending the Provisions of an Act of the Seventh Year of King George the Fourth, (Note: Criminal Law Act 1826 (7 Geo. 4. c. 64)) as to taking Bail in Cases of Felony. (Repealed by Statute Law Revision Act 1891 (54 & 55 Vict. c. 67))
Larceny (Ireland) Act 1835 (repealed)	5 & 6 Will. 4. c. 34	25 August 1835
An Act to amend Two clerical Errors contained in an Act passed in the Ninth Year of the Reign of His late Majesty King George the Fourth, intituled "An Act for consolidating and amending the Laws in Ireland relating to Larceny and other Offences connected therewith." (Note: Larceny (Ireland) Act 1828 (9 Geo. 4. c. 55)) (Repealed by Criminal Statutes Repeal Act 1861 (24 & 25 Vict. c. 95))
Paymaster General Act 1835	5 & 6 Will. 4. c. 35	25 August 1835
An Act for consolidating the Offices of Paymaster General, Paymaster and Treasurer of Chelsea Hospital, Treasurer of the Navy, and Treasurer of the Ordnance.
Parliamentary Elections Act 1835 (repealed)	5 & 6 Will. 4. c. 36	25 August 1835
An Act to limit the Time of taking the Poll in Boroughs at contested Elections of Members to serve in Parliament to One Day. (Repealed by Representation of the People Act 1948 (11 & 12 Geo. 6. c. 65))
Militia Act 1835 (repealed)	5 & 6 Will. 4. c. 37	25 August 1835
An Act for the further Reduction of the Militia Staff, and to suspend the Ballot for the Militia. (Repealed by Statute Law Revision Act 1861 (24 & 25 Vict. c. 101))
Prisons Act 1835 (repealed)	5 & 6 Will. 4. c. 38	25 August 1835
An Act for effecting greater Uniformity of Practice in the Government of the several Prisons in England and Wales; and for appointing Inspectors of Prisons in Great Britain. (Repealed by Prison Act 1865 (28 & 29 Vict. c. 126), Statute Law Revision Act 1874 (37 & 38 Vict. c. 35), Prison Act 1877 (40 & 41 Vict. c. 21), Prisons (Scotland) Act 1877 (40 & 41 Vict. c. 53), Statute Law Revision (No. 2) Act 1888 (51 & 52 Vict. c. 57) and Statute Law Revision Act 1953 (2 & 3 Eliz. 2. c. 5))
Excise Act 1835 (repealed)	5 & 6 Will. 4. c. 39	31 August 1835
An Act to exempt certain Retailers of Spirits to a small Amount from the additional Duties on Licences; and to discontinue the Excise Survey on Wine, and the Use of Permits for the Removal thereof. (Repealed by Customs and Excise Act 1952 (15 & 16 Geo. 6 & 1 Eliz. 2. c. 44))
Duty on Wood Act 1835 (repealed)	5 & 6 Will. 4. c. 40	31 August 1835
An Act to provide for the better Collection of the Duties on Wood the Produce of Places in Europe. (Repealed by Statute Law Revision Act 1861 (24 & 25 Vict. c. 101))
Gaming Act 1835 (repealed)	5 & 6 Will. 4. c. 41	31 August 1835
An Act to amend the Law relating to Securities given for Considerations arising out of gaming, usurious, and certain other illegal Transactions. (Repealed by Gambling Act 2005 (c. 19) and Betting, Gaming, Lotteries and Amusements (Northern Ireland) Order 1985 (SI 1985/1204))
Insolvency Courts Act 1835 (repealed)	5 & 6 Will. 4. c. 42	31 August 1835
An Act to authorize the granting of Superannuation Allowances to the Commissioners and Officers of the Courts for the Relief of Insolvent Debtors. (Repealed by Statute Law Revision Act 1950 (14 Geo. 6. c. 6))
Special Constables Act 1835 (repealed)	5 & 6 Will. 4. c. 43	31 August 1835
An Act for enlarging the Powers of Magistrates in the Appointment of Special Constables. (Repealed by Police Act 1964 (c. 48))
Exchequer Bills (No. 2) Act 1835 (repealed)	5 & 6 Will. 4. c. 44	31 August 1835
An Act for raising the Sum of Thirteen millions five hundred twenty-one thousand five hundred and fifty Pounds by Exchequer Bills, for the Service of the Year One thousand eight hundred and thirty-five. (Repealed by Statute Law Revision Act 1874 (37 & 38 Vict. c. 35))
Abolition of Slavery Act 1835 (repealed)	5 & 6 Will. 4. c. 45	31 August 1835
An Act to carry into further Execution the Provisions of an Act passed in the Third and Fourth Years of His present Majesty, (Note: Slavery Abolition Act 1833 (3 & 4 Will. 4. c. 73)) for compensating Owners of Slaves upon the Abolition of Slavery. (Repealed by Court of Chancery (Funds) Act 1872 (35 & 36 Vict. c. 44))
Exchequer Court (Scotland) Act 1835 (repealed)	5 & 6 Will. 4. c. 46	31 August 1835
An Act to amend, until the End of the next Session of Parliament, an Act of the Second Year of His present Majesty, (Note: Exchequer Court (Scotland) Act 1832 (2 & 3 Will. 4. c. 54)) for making Provision for the Dispatch of the Business now done by the Court of Exchequer in Scotland. (Repealed by Statute Law Revision Act 1874 (37 & 38 Vict. c. 35))
Clerk of Crown in Chancery Act 1835 (repealed)	5 & 6 Will. 4. c. 47	31 August 1835
An Act to repeal so much of an Act passed in the Third and Fourth Years of His present Majesty (Note: Lord Chancellor's Offices Act 1833 (3 & 4 Will. 4. c. 84)) as relates to the Amount of the Salary granted to the Clerk of the Crown in Chancery; and to make other Provisions in relation to the said Office. (Repealed by Great Seal (Offices) Act 1874 (37 & 38 Vict. c. 81))
Peace Preservation (Ireland) Act 1835 (repealed)	5 & 6 Will. 4. c. 48	31 August 1835
An Act for the better Prevention and more speedy Punishment of Offences endangering the Public Peace in Ireland. (Repealed by Statute Law Revision Act 1874 (37 & 38 Vict. c. 35))
Turnpike Acts Continuance Act 1835 (repealed)	5 & 6 Will. 4. c. 49	31 August 1835
An Act for continuing until the First Day of June One thousand eight hundred and thirty-seven, the several Acts for regulating the Turnpike Roads in Great Britain which will expire on the First Day of June One thousand eight hundred and thirty-six or with the next Session of Parliament. (Repealed by Statute Law Revision Act 1874 (37 & 38 Vict. c. 35))
Highway Act 1835	5 & 6 Will. 4. c. 50	31 August 1835
An Act to consolidate and amend the Laws relating to Highways in that Part of Great Britain called England.
Dominica, etc., Relief Act 1835 (repealed)	5 & 6 Will. 4. c. 51	31 August 1835
An Act for granting Relief to the Island of Dominica; and to amend an Act of the Second and Third Years of His present Majesty, (Note: Loans for Jamaica, Trinidad, etc. Act 1832 (2 & 3 Will. 4. c. 125)) for enabling His Majesty to direct the Issue of Exchequer Bills to a limited Amount for the Purposes therein mentioned. (Repealed by West India Loan Act 1879 (42 & 43 Vict. c. 16))
India (North-West Provinces) Act 1835 (repealed)	5 & 6 Will. 4. c. 52	31 August 1835
An Act to authorise the Court of Directors of the East India Company to suspend the Execution of the Provisions of the Act of the Third and Fourth William the Fourth, Chapter Eighty-five, (Note: Government of India Act 1833 (3 & 4 Will. 4. c. 85)) so far as they relate to the Creation of the Government of Agra. (Repealed by Government of India Act 1915 (5 & 6 Geo. 5. c. 61))
Merchant Vessels, etc. Act 1835 (repealed)	5 & 6 Will. 4. c. 53	31 August 1835
An Act to repeal an Act of the Ninth Year of His late Majesty, (Note: Passengers in Merchant Vessels Act 1828 (9 Geo. 4. c. 21)) for regulating the Carriage of Passengers in Merchant Vessels from the United Kingdom to the British Possessions on the Continent and Islands of North America; and to make further Provision for regulating the Carriage of Passengers from the United Kingdom. (Repealed by Government of India Act 1915 (5 & 6 Geo. 5. c. 61))
Marriage Act 1835 (repealed)	5 & 6 Will. 4. c. 54	31 August 1835
An Act to render certain Marriages valid, and to alter the Law with respect to certain voidable Marriages. (Repealed by Marriage Act 1949 (12, 13 & 14 Geo. 6. c. 76) and Marriage (Northern Ireland) Order 1984 (SI 1984/1984))
Sheriffs (Ireland) Act 1835 (repealed)	5 & 6 Will. 4. c. 55	9 September 1835
An Act for facilitating the Appointment of Sheriffs in Ireland, and the more effectual Audit and passing of their Accounts; and for the more speedy Return and Recovery of Fines, Fees, Forfeitures, Recognizances, Penalties, and Deodands; and to abolish certain Offices in the Court of Exchequer in Ireland; and to amend the Laws relating to Grants in custodiam and Recovery of Debts in Ireland; and to amend an Act of the Second and Third Years of His present Majesty, for transferring the Powers and Duties of the Commissioners of Public Accounts in Ireland to the Commissioners for auditing the Public Accounts of Great Britain. (Repealed by Statute Law Revision Act 1950 (14 Geo. 6. c. 6))
Tonnage, etc., of Ships Act 1835 (repealed)	5 & 6 Will. 4. c. 56	9 September 1835
An Act to regulate the Admeasurement of the Tonnage and Burthen of the Merchant Shipping of the United Kingdom. (Repealed by Customs (Repeal) Act 1845 (8 & 9 Vict. c. 84))
Savings Bank Act 1835 (repealed)	5 & 6 Will. 4. c. 57	9 September 1835
An Act to extend to Scotland certain Provisions of an Act of the Ninth Year of His late Majesty, (Note: Savings Bank Act 1828 (9 Geo. 4. c. 92)) to consolidate and amend the Laws relating to Savings Banks; and to consolidate and amend the Laws relating to Savings Banks in Scotland. (Repealed by Post Office Savings Bank Act 1954 (2 & 3 Eliz. 2. c. 62) and Trustee Savings Banks Act 1954 (2 & 3 Eliz. 2. c. 63))
Crown Lands (Scotland) Act 1835 (repealed)	5 & 6 Will. 4. c. 58	9 September 1835
An Act to amend the Acts relating to the Hereditary Land Revenues of the Crown in Scotland. (Repealed by Statute Law Revision Act 1874 (37 & 38 Vict. c. 35), Crown Lands Act 1894 (57 & 58 Vict. c. 43) and Crown Estate Act 1961 (9 & 10 Eliz. 2. c. 55))
Cruelty to Animals Act 1835 (repealed)	5 & 6 Will. 4. c. 59	9 September 1835
An Act to Consolidate and Amend the Several Laws Relating to the Cruel and Improper Treatment of Animals, and the Mischiefs Arising from the Driving of Cattle, and to Make Other Provisions in Regard Thereto. (Repealed by Cruelty to Animals Act 1849 (12 & 13 Vict. c. 92))
Slave Trade Act 1835 (repealed)	5 & 6 Will. 4. c. 60	9 September 1835
An Act for carrying into effect a Treaty with the King of the French and the King of Sardinia for suppressing the Slave Trade. (Repealed by Slave Trade Act 1873 (36 & 37 Vict. c. 88))
Slave Trade (No. 2) Act 1835 (repealed)	5 & 6 Will. 4. c. 61	9 September 1835
An Act for carrying into effect the Treaty with the King of the French and the King of Denmark for suppressing the Slave Trade. (Repealed by Slave Trade Act 1873 (36 & 37 Vict. c. 88))
Statutory Declarations Act 1835	5 & 6 Will. 4. c. 62	9 September 1835
An Act to repeal an Act of the present Session of Parliament, intituled "An Act for the more effectual Abolition of Oaths and Affirmations taken and made in various Departments of State, and to substitute Declarations in lieu thereof, and for the more entire Suppression of voluntary and extra-judicial Oaths and Affidavits"; (Note: Declarations Act 1835 (5 & 6 Will. 4. c. 8)) and to make Provisions for the Abolition of unnecessary Oaths.
Weights and Measures Act 1835 (repealed)	5 & 6 Will. 4. c. 63	9 September 1835
An Act to repeal an Act of the Fourth and Fifth Year of His present Majesty (Note: Weights and Measures Act 1834 (4 & 5 Will. 4. c. 49)) relating to Weights and Measures, and to make other Provisions instead thereof. (Repealed by Weights and Measures Act 1878 (41 & 42 Vict. c. 49))
Stamp Duties Act 1835 (repealed)	5 & 6 Will. 4. c. 64	9 September 1835
An Act to alter certain Duties of Stamps and Assessed Taxes, and to regulate the Collection thereof. (Repealed by Indian Securities Act 1860 (23 & 24 Vict. c. 5), Revenue Act 1869 (32 & 33 Vict. c. 14), Inland Revenue Repeal Act 1870 (33 & 34 Vict. c. 99), Statute Law Revision Act 1874 (37 & 38 Vict. c. 35), Taxes Management Act 1880 (43 & 44 Vict. c. 19) and East India Loans Act 1937 (1 Edw. 8 & 1 Geo. 6. c. 14))
Lectures Copyright Act 1835 (repealed)	5 & 6 Will. 4. c. 65	9 September 1835
An Act for preventing the Publication of Lectures without Consent. (Repealed by Copyright Act 1911 (1 & 2 Geo. 5. c. 46))
Customs Act 1835 (repealed)	5 & 6 Will. 4. c. 66	9 September 1835
An Act to amend the Law relating to the Customs. (Repealed by Customs (Repeal) Act 1845 (8 & 9 Vict. c. 84))
Shannon Navigation Improvement Act 1835 (repealed)	5 & 6 Will. 4. c. 67	9 September 1835
An Act for the Improvement of the Navigation of the River Shannon. (Repealed by Statute Law Revision Act 1874 (37 & 38 Vict. c. 35))
Militia Pay Act 1835 (repealed)	5 & 6 Will. 4. c. 68	9 September 1835
An Act to defray the Charge of the Pay, Clothing, and contingent and other Expences of the Disembodied Militia in Great Britain and Ireland; and to grant Allowances in certain Cases to Subaltern Officers, Adjutants, Paymasters, Quarter Masters, Surgeons, Assistant Surgeons, Surgeons Mates, and Serjeant Majors of the Militia, until the First Day of July One thousand eight hundred and thirty-six. (Repealed by Statute Law Revision Act 1874 (37 & 38 Vict. c. 35))
Union and Parish Property Act 1835 (repealed)	5 & 6 Will. 4. c. 69	9 September 1835
An Act to facilitate the Conveyance of Workhouses and other Property of Parishes and of Incorporations or Unions of Parishes in England and Wales. (Repealed by Poor Law Act 1927 (17 & 18 Geo. 5. c. 14) and Local Government Act 1929 (19 & 20 Geo. 5. c. 17))
Imprisonment for Debt (Scotland) Act 1835 (repealed)	5 & 6 Will. 4. c. 70	9 September 1835
An Act for abolishing, in Scotland, Imprisonment for Civil Debts of small Amount. (Repealed by Statute Law Revision Act 1891 (54 & 55 Vict. c. 67))
Charities Inquiries (England) Act 1835 (repealed)	5 & 6 Will. 4. c. 71	9 September 1835
An Act for appointing Commissioners to continue the Inquiries concerning Charities in England and Wales until the First Day of March One thousand eight hundred and thirty-seven. (Repealed by Statute Law Revision Act 1874 (37 & 38 Vict. c. 35))
Excise Incorporation (Scotland) Act 1835 (repealed)	5 & 6 Will. 4. c. 72	9 September 1835
An Act for abolishing the Excise Incorporation in Scotland, and for transferring the Funds of the said Incorporation to the Consolidated Fund, and providing for the Payment of the Annuities to the Widows and Orphans of late and present Members of the Incorporation Fund. (Repealed by Statute Law Revision Act 1950 (14 Geo. 6. c. 6))
Bail in Cases of Forgery, etc. (Scotland) Act 1835 (repealed)	5 & 6 Will. 4. c. 73	9 September 1835
An Act to provide that Persons accused of Forgery in Scotland shall not be entitled to Bail unless in certain Cases. (Repealed by Statute Law Revision Act 1891 (54 & 55 Vict. c. 67))
Tithes Act 1835 (repealed)	5 & 6 Will. 4. c. 74	9 September 1835
An Act for the more easy Recovery of Tithes. (Repealed by Statute Law Revision (No. 2) Act 1890 (53 & 54 Vict. c. 51))
Tithing of Turnips Severed from the Ground Act 1835 (repealed)	5 & 6 Will. 4. c. 75	9 September 1835
An Act for the Amendment of the Law as to the tithing of Turnips in certain Cases. (Repealed by Statute Law Revision (No. 2) Act 1888 (51 & 52 Vict. c. 57))
Municipal Corporations Act 1835 or the Municipal Reform Act 1835 or the Municipal Corporations (England) Act 1835 (repealed)	5 & 6 Will. 4. c. 76	9 September 1835
An Act to provide for the Regulation of Municipal Corporations in England and Wales. (Repealed by Municipal Corporations Act 1882 (45 & 46 Vict. c. 50))
Glass Duties Act 1835 (repealed)	5 & 6 Will. 4. c. 77	9 September 1835
An Act to repeal the Duty and Drawback on Flint Glass, to impose other Duties and another Drawback in lieu thereof, and to reduce the Drawback on German Sheet Glass exported in Panes; and to repeal the Drawback on unground and unpolished Plate Glass; and to amend the Laws relating to the Duties on Glass. (Repealed by Glass Duties Act 1838 (1 & 2 Vict. c. 44))
Representation of the People (Scotland) Act 1835 (repealed)	5 & 6 Will. 4. c. 78	9 September 1835
An Act to explain and amend an Act passed in the Second and Third Year of the Reign of King William the Fourth, (Note: Representation of the People (Scotland) Act 1832 (2 & 3 Will. 4. c. 65)) for amending the Representation of the People in Scotland; and to diminish the Expences there. (Repealed by Representation of the People Act 1948 (11 & 12 Geo. 6. c. 65))
Tithe Instalments Recover (Ireland) Act 1835 (repealed)	5 & 6 Will. 4. c. 79	9 September 1835
An Act to suspend, until after the Sixth Day of April One thousand eight hundred and thirty-six, Proceedings for recovering Payment of certain Instalments of the Money advanced under the Acts for establishing Tithe Compositions in Ireland. (Repealed by Statute Law Revision Act 1874 (37 & 38 Vict. c. 35))
Appropriation Act 1835 (repealed)	5 & 6 Will. 4. c. 80	10 September 1835
An Act to apply a Sum of Money out of the Consolidated Fund and the Surplus of Ways and Means to the Service of the Year One thousand eight hundred and thirty-five, and to appropriate the Supplies granted in this Session of Parliament. (Repealed by Statute Law Revision Act 1874 (37 & 38 Vict. c. 35))
Capital Punishment Abolition Act 1835 (repealed)	5 & 6 Will. 4. c. 81	10 September 1835
An Act for abolishing Capital Punishments in Cases of Letter Stealing and Sacrilege. (Repealed by Statute Law Revision Act 1874 (37 & 38 Vict. c. 35))
Offices in Court of Chancery, etc. Act 1835 (repealed)	5 & 6 Will. 4. c. 82	10 September 1835
An Act to abolish certain Offices connected with Fines and Recoveries and the Cursitors in the Court of Chancery, and to make Provision for the Abolition of certain Offices in the Superior Courts of Common Law in England. (Repealed by Statute Law Revision Act 1874 (37 & 38 Vict. c. 35))
Letters Patent for Inventions Act 1835 (repealed)	5 & 6 Will. 4. c. 83	10 September 1835
An Act to amend the Law touching Letters Patent for Inventions. (Repealed by Patents, Designs, and Trade Marks Act 1883 (46 & 47 Vict. c. 57))
Piers and Quays (Ireland) Act 1835 (repealed)	5 & 6 Will. 4. c. 84	10 September 1835
An Act to empower Grand Juries in Ireland to raise Money by Presentment for the Construction, Enlargement, or Repair of Piers and Quays. (Repealed for Northern Ireland by Harbours Act (Northern Ireland) 1970 (c. 1 (N.I.)))

=== Local acts ===
Short title	Citation	Royal assent
Long title
Ledbury High Street Act 1835 (repealed)	5 & 6 Will. 4. c. i	13 April 1835
An Act for the Improvement of the High Street in the Borough of Ledbury in the County of Hereford. (Repealed by Statute Law (Repeals) Act 1998 (c. 43))
Belfast and Crumlin Turnpike Road Act 1835 (repealed)	5 & 6 Will. 4. c. ii	13 April 1835
An Act for making, maintaining, and repairing a Turnpike Road from the Town of Belfast to the Town of Crumlin in the County of Antrim. (Repealed by Turnpike Trusts Abolition (Ireland) Act 1857 (20 & 21 Vict. c. 16))
Road from Carmarthen to Newcastle Emlyn Act 1835 (repealed)	5 & 6 Will. 4. c. iii	13 April 1835
An Act for more effectually repairing the Road from Carmarthen to Newcastle Emlyn, and several other Roads, and for making and maintaining new Lines of Road, all in the County of Carmarthen. (Repealed by Turnpike Trusts in South Wales Act 1844 (7 & 8 Vict. c. 91))
University Life Assurance Society Act 1835	5 & 6 Will. 4. c. iv	13 April 1835
An Act to enable the University Life Assurance Society and their Successors to purchase Annuities upon or for Lives, and also to lend Money or Stock upon Mortgage for the Purpose of Investment.
Barking Rates Act 1835 (repealed)	5 & 6 Will. 4. c. v	12 June 1835
An Act for better assessing and collecting the Poor and other Rates in the Parish of Barking in the County of Essex. (Repealed by Statute Law (Repeals) Act 2008 (c.12))
Ramsgate Water Act 1835 (repealed)	5 & 6 Will. 4. c. vi	12 June 1835
An Act for better supplying with Water the Parish of Ramsgate, and the Neighbourhood thereof, in the County of Kent. (Repealed by Kent Water Act 1955 (4 & 5 Eliz. 2. c. xi))
Rolle Canal (Devon) Act 1835	5 & 6 Will. 4. c. vii	12 June 1835
An Act to authorize the Sale to and Purchase by John Lord Rolle of the Rights of Persons claiming to have divers Rights on such Parts of Great Torrington and Castle Hill Commons in the County of Devon as now form Part of the Cut or Canal called the Rolle Canal.
Warrington and Newton Railway Act 1835 (repealed)	5 & 6 Will. 4. c. viii	12 June 1835
An Act for incorporating the Warrington and Newton Railway with the Grand Junction Railway, and for extending to the said first-mentioned Railway the Provisions of the several Acts of Parliament relating to the said last-mentioned Railway; and for other Purposes relating thereto. (Repealed by London and North Western Railway Act 1846 (9 & 10 Vict. c. cciv))
Grand Junction Railway Act 1835 (repealed)	5 & 6 Will. 4. c. ix	12 June 1835
An Act to enable the Grand Junction Railway Company to alter the Line of such Railway, and to make Two Branches therefrom in the County of Stafford, and for other Purposes relating thereto. (Repealed by London and North Western Railway Act 1846 (9 & 10 Vict. c. cciv))
London and Croydon Railway Act 1835	5 & 6 Will. 4. c. x	12 June 1835
An Act for making a Railway from Croydon to join the London and Greenwich Railway near London.
Burry Port Act 1835 (repealed)	5 & 6 Will. 4. c. xi	12 June 1835
An Act to enlarge the Powers of the New Pembrey Harbour Act, (Note: New Pembrey Harbour Act 1825 (6 Geo. 4. c. cxv)) to change the Name of the Harbour to that of Burry Port, and to enable the Burry Port Company to raise a further Sum of Money. (Repealed by Burry Port Harbour Revision Order 2000 (SI 2000/2152))
New Quay (Cardigan) Harbour Act 1835	5 & 6 Will. 4. c. xii	12 June 1835
An Act for constructing and maintaining a Harbour at New Quay in the County of Cardigan.
Deptford Pier Act 1835	5 & 6 Will. 4. c. xiii	12 June 1835
An Act for making and maintaining a Pier and other Works at Deptford in the County of Kent.
River Leven Drainage Act 1835	5 & 6 Will. 4. c. xiv	12 June 1835
An Act to enable the Commissioner appointed under Two Acts (Note: Kinross and Fife Drainage and Water Supply Act 1827 (7 & 8 Geo. 4. c. cv)) (Note: River Leven Drainage (Kinross and Fife) Act 1831 (1 & 2 Will. 4. c. x)) for draining certain Lands situated on or near the River Leven in the Counties of Kinross and Fife to raise a further Sum of Money for the Purposes of the said Acts.
Devonport Market Act 1835	5 & 6 Will. 4. c. xv	12 June 1835
An Act to enlarge and regulate the Market now held in the Town of Devonport in the County of Devon, and to establish a Market within the said Town for Corn, Grain, and other Articles, and to regulate the Amount of Tolls to be paid within the said Markets.
Llanelly Gas Act 1835 (repealed)	5 & 6 Will. 4. c. xvi	12 June 1835
An Act for lighting with Gas the Town and Neighbourhood of Llanelly in the County of Carmarthen. (Repealed by Llanelly Gas Act 1874 (37 & 38 Vict. c. lx))
Honiton Parish Church Act 1835	5 & 6 Will. 4. c. xvii	12 June 1835
An Act for building a new Parish Church in the Town of Honiton in the County of Devon.
Westminster Improvement Act 1835	5 & 6 Will. 4. c. xviii	12 June 1835
An Act for paving, cleansing, lighting, and regulating the several Parishes of Saint Margaret, Saint John the Evangelist, and Saint James, within the Liberty of Westminster in the County of Middlesex, and the Precinct of the Savoy, and also Part of the Liberty of Saffron Hill, Hatton Garden, and Ely Bents, within the same County; and for other Purposes therein mentioned.
Little Bowden and Rockingham Road Act 1835 (repealed)	5 & 6 Will. 4. c. xix	12 June 1835
An Act for repairing the Road from Little Bowden in the County of Northampton to Rockingham in the same County. (Repealed by Annual Turnpike Acts Continuance Act 1875 (38 & 39 Vict. c. cxciv))
Farnborough and Sevenoaks Road Act 1835	5 & 6 Will. 4. c. xx	12 June 1835
An Act for repairing the Road from Farnborough (Note: Farnborough, Kent.) to Riverhill in the Parish of Sevenoaks (Note: Sevenoaks, Kent.) in the County of Kent, and for making several Diversions in the said Road.
Road from New Quay (Cardigan) to Aberayron Act 1835 (repealed)	5 & 6 Will. 4. c. xxi	12 June 1835
An Act for making and maintaining a Road from New Quay in the County of Cardigan to Aberayron in the same County. (Repealed by South Wales Turnpike Trusts Act 1844 (7 & 8 Vict. c. 91))
Hereford Roads Act 1835	5 & 6 Will. 4. c. xxii	12 June 1835
An Act for improving certain Roads within the County of Hereford communicating with the City of Hereford.
Avenue Road and Marylebone and Finchley Turnpike Roads Act 1835	5 & 6 Will. 4. c. xxiii	12 June 1835
An Act to incorporate the Avenue Road in the Parish of Saint Marylebone with the Marylebone and Finchley Turnpike Roads in the County of Middlesex.
Road from Hurstpierpoint to Cuckfield Act 1835	5 & 6 Will. 4. c. xxiv	12 June 1835
An Act for making and maintaining a Turnpike Road from the Town of Hurstpierpoint to the Brighton and Cuckfield Turnpike Road at or near Ansty Cross in the Parish of Cuckfield, all in the County of Sussex.
Darlington and West Auckland and Cockerton Bridge and Staindrop Roads Act 1835	5 & 6 Will. 4. c. xxv	12 June 1835
An Act for more effectually repairing the Darlington and West Auckland and the Cockerton Bridge and Staindrop Roads in the County of Durham, and for consolidating the Trusts thereof.
Totnes and Bridgetown Roads and Bridges Act 1835	5 & 6 Will. 4. c. xxvi	12 June 1835
An Act for more effectually repairing the Road from the Exeter Turnpike Road to Biddaford, and certain Roads leading from Bridgetown Pomeroy and Totnes, and other Roads communicating therewith; and for repairing Totnes Bridge, and erecting Bridges over the Stover Canal, the Rivers Teign and Lemon, and the Mill Leat; all in the County of Devon.
Ford and Lowick Turnpikes Act 1835 (repealed)	5 & 6 Will. 4. c. xxvii	12 June 1835
An Act for repairing and improving the Roads in the Counties of Northumberland and Durham called the Ford and Lowick Turnpikes, and for making certain new Branches in the said Counties. (Repealed by Ford and Lowick Turnpike Trust Act 1867 (30 & 31 Vict. c. lxxxiv))
Nantwich and Congleton Turnpike Road Act 1835	5 & 6 Will. 4. c. xxviii	12 June 1835
An Act for making Turnpike certain Highways between the Towns of Nantwich and Congleton in the County Palatine of Chester.
Shilhay Bridge and River Exe Ferry or Footbridge Act 1835	5 & 6 Will. 4. c. xxix	17 June 1835
An Act for building a Bridge over the River Exe from the Shilhay at the City of Exeter, and for making Approaches thereto; and for removing the present Ferry across the said River, and establishing another Ferry or a Foot-bridge in lieu thereof.
Manchester, Bolton and Bury Canal and Railway Act 1835	5 & 6 Will. 4. c. xxx	17 June 1835
An Act to amend the Acts relating to the Manchester, Bolton, and Bury Canal Navigation and Railway, and to make a Branch Railway to Bolton.
Newcastle-upon-Tyne and Carlisle Railway Act 1835	5 & 6 Will. 4. c. xxxi	17 June 1835
An Act to authorize the Newcastle upon Tyne and Carlisle Railway Company to make an additional Branch Railway or Tramroad; and for other Purposes connected with their Undertaking.
River Cart Navigation and Paisley Harbour Act 1835	5 & 6 Will. 4. c. xxxii	17 June 1835
An Act to amend an Act (Note: River Cart Navigation Act 1787 (27 Geo. 3. c. 56)) for improving the Navigation of the River Cart, and for deepening and extending the Harbour of Paisley, in the County of Renfrew.
Edinburgh Water Company's Act 1835 (repealed)	5 & 6 Will. 4. c. xxxiii	17 June 1835
An Act to enable the Edinburgh Water Company to borrow a further Sum of Money. (Repealed by Edinburgh Water Company's Act 1847 (10 & 11 Vict. c. ccii))
Birmingham Canal Navigations Act 1835 or the Birmingham Canal Navigations Consolidation Act 1835	5 & 6 Will. 4. c. xxxiv	17 June 1835
An Act to consolidate and extend the Powers and Provisions of the several Acts relating to the Birmingham Canal Navigations.
Ashburton and Totnes Road Act 1835	5 & 6 Will. 4. c. xxxv	17 June 1835
An Act for making, maintaining, and repairing certain Roads near the Towns of Ashburton and Totnes in the County of Devon.
Road from Wellington Bridge Road to Tong Lane End (Yorkshire) Act 1835 (repealed)	5 & 6 Will. 4. c. xxxvi	17 June 1835
An Act for repairing and maintaining the Road from the Wellington Bridge Road in the Parish of Leeds to Tong Lane End in the Parish of Birstal, and other Roads branching therefrom, and for making and maintaining a new Road from the aforesaid Road at Swallow Hill in the Township of Wortley to Pudsey, all in the West Riding of the County of York. (Repealed by Annual Turnpike Acts Continuance Act 1869 (32 & 33 Vict. c. 90))
Sandbach and Congleton Turnpike Road (Cheshire) Act 1835	5 & 6 Will. 4. c. xxxvii	17 June 1835
An Act for making and maintaining a Road from Sandbach to Congleton in the County Palatine of Chester, and a Branch Road communicating therewith.
Mullen's Pond to New Sarum Road (Wiltshire) Act 1835	5 & 6 Will. 4. c. xxxviii	17 June 1835
An Act for more effectually repairing the Road from Mullen's Pond in the County of Southampton, through Amesbury, to the Eighteen Mile Stone from the City of New Sarum near Willoughby Hedge in the County of Wilts, and several other Roads leading out of the said Road.
Hitchin, Shefford, Henlow and Gorford Bridge Roads Act 1835	5 & 6 Will. 4. c. xxxix	17 June 1835
An Act for more effectually repairing and improving the Road from the Town of Hitchin, through Shefford, to the Turnpike Road from Saint Albans to Bedford, and also the Road from the Turning out of the said Road to Henlow and Gerford Bridge, and other Roads therein mentioned, in the Counties of Hertford and Bedford.
Norwich and Swaffham Road Act 1835 (repealed)	5 & 6 Will. 4. c. xl	17 June 1835
An Act for more effectually repairing the Road from Saint Benedict's Gate in the County of the City of Norwich to Swaffham in the County of Norfolk, and from Halfpenny Bridge in Honingham to the Bounds of Yaxham, and also a Lane called Hangman s Lane, near the Gates of the said City. (Repealed by Statute Law (Repeals) Act 2008 (c. 12))
Duffield, Belper and Heage Road (Derbyshire) Act 1835	5 & 6 Will. 4. c. xli	17 June 1835
An Act for more effectually repairing the Road from Duffield, through Belper, to Heage in the County of Derby, and for making a new Line of Road communicating therewith.
Dublin Oil Gas Light Company Act 1835 (repealed)	5 & 6 Will. 4. c. xlii	17 June 1835
An Act to empower the Dublin Oil Gas Light Company to produce Gas from Coal, Peat, Turf, and other Materials; and to amend the Act (Note: Dublin Oil Gas Light Company Act 1824 (5 Geo. 4. c. xlii)) relating to the said Company. (Repealed by United General Gaslight Company's Act 1866 (29 & 30 Vict. c. cxcix))
Grosvenor Square Improvement Act 1835 (repealed)	5 & 6 Will. 4. c. xliii	3 July 1835
An Act to enable the Inhabitants of Grosvenor Square in the County of Middlesex more effectually to pave, cleanse, light, water, and embellish the said Square. (Repealed by Roosevelt Memorial Act 1946 (9 & 10 Geo. 6. c. 83))
East India Dock Act 1835 (repealed)	5 & 6 Will. 4. c. xliv	3 July 1835
An Act for enlarging the Powers of an Act passed in the Ninth Year of the Reign of King George the Fourth, (Note: East India Dock Act 1828 (9 Geo. 4. c. xcv)) to consolidate and amend several Acts for the further Improvement of the Port of London, by making Docks and other Works at Blackwall for the Accommodation of East India Shipping. (Repealed by Port of London (Consolidation) Act 1920 (10 & 11 Geo. 5. c. clxxiii))
Tormoham Improvement Act 1835	5 & 6 Will. 4. c. xlv	3 July 1835
An Act for lighting, watching, and improving the Parish of Tormoham in the County of Devon.
Aberystwyth Improvement Act 1835 (repealed)	5 & 6 Will. 4. c. xlvi	3 July 1835
An Act for improving and regulating the Town of Aberystwyth in the County of Cardigan, and for supplying the Inhabitants thereof with Water. (Repealed by Dyfed Act 1987 (c. xxiv))
Dover Improvement Act 1835	5 & 6 Will. 4. c. xlvii	3 July 1835
An Act to alter and amend Three several Acts (Note: Dover Streets Act 1778 (18 Geo. 3. c. 76)) (Note: Dover Improvement Act 1810 (50 Geo. 3. c. xxvi)) (Note: Dover Improvement Act 1830 (11 Geo. 4 & 1 Will. 4. c. cxvii)) for paving, cleansing, and improving the Town of Dovor; and for making further Improvements in the said Town.
Wells Harbour and Quay Act 1835	5 & 6 Will. 4. c. xlviii	3 July 1835
An Act for more effectually repairing, improving, and preserving the Harbour and Quay of Wells in the County of Norfolk.
Great Yarmouth Haven, Bridge and Navigation Act 1835	5 & 6 Will. 4. c. xlix	3 July 1835
An Act for improving the Haven of Great Yarmouth in the County of Norfolk, and the several Rivers connected therewith, and for repairing or taking down and rebuilding a certain Bridge over the said Haven at Great Yarmouth aforesaid, and a certain Bridge called Saint Olave's Bridge, over the River Waveney, in the Counties of Norfolk and Suffolk; and for suspending for a limited Period certain Duties payable to the Corporation of Great Yarmouth, and imposing other Duties in lieu thereof.
Winchester Market Act 1835	5 & 6 Will. 4. c. l	3 July 1835
An Act for establishing a new Market for Live Stock and Agricultural Produce, and erecting a Market House or Corn Exchange, in the City of Winchester.
Cardiff Markets Act 1835	5 & 6 Will. 4. c. li	3 July 1835
An Act for removing the Markets held in the Town of Cardiff in the County of Glamorgan, and for providing other Market Places in lieu thereof.
Downham Market Improvement Act 1835	5 & 6 Will. 4. c. lii	3 July 1835
An Act for paving, lighting, and watching the Town and Parish of Downham Market in the County of Norfolk.
Neath Market Act 1835 (repealed)	5 & 6 Will. 4. c. liii	3 July 1835
An Act for removing the Markets held in the Town and Borough of Neath in the County of Glamorgan, and for providing a new Market Place in the said Town in lieu thereof. (Repealed by Mid Glamorgan County Council Act 1987 (c. vii))
Liverpool Improvement Act 1835 (repealed)	5 & 6 Will. 4. c. liv	3 July 1835
An Act for altering, amending, and extending the Powers and Provisions of an Act of the Sixth Year of His late Majesty King George the Fourth, (Note: Liverpool Buildings and Docks Act 1825 (6 Geo. 4. c. lxxv)) for the Regulation of Buildings in the Town of Liverpool, and for the other Purposes therein mentioned; and for granting further and additional Powers for the Improvement and Regulation of the said Town, and the Preservation of Property therein from Fires, and otherwise. (Repealed by Liverpool Improvement Act 1842 (5 & 6 Vict. c. cvi))
Slamannan Railway Act 1835	5 & 6 Will. 4. c. lv	3 July 1835
An Act to make and maintain a Railway from Stanrig and Arbuckle in the County of Lanark to the Union Canal at Causewayend in the County of Stirling.
London and Birmingham Railway Act 1835 (repealed)	5 & 6 Will. 4. c. lvi	3 July 1835
An Act to enable the London and Birmingham Railway Company to extend and alter the Line of such Railway, and for other Purposes relating thereto. (Repealed by London and North Western Railway Act 1846 (9 & 10 Vict. c. cciv))
Leeds and Selby Railway Act 1835	5 & 6 Will. 4. c. lvii	3 July 1835
An Act to enable the Leeds and Selby Railway Company to improve the Line of the said Railway; and for amending and enlarging the Powers and Provisions of an Act (Note: Leeds and Selby Railway Act 1830 (11 Geo. 4 & 1 Will. 4. c. lix)) relating to such Railway.
Preston and Wyre Railway and Harbour Act 1835	5 & 6 Will. 4. c. lviii	3 July 1835
An Act for making a Railway from Preston to Wyre, and for improving the Harbour of Wyre, in the County Palatine of Lancaster.
Wilts and Berks Canal Navigation Act 1835	5 & 6 Will. 4. c. lix	3 July 1835
An Act for consolidating the Shares in the Wilts and Berks Canal Navigation, and for extending the Powers of the Act of Incorporation (Note: Wilts and Berks Canal Navigation Act 1821 (1 & 2 Geo. 4. c. xcvii)) of the Company of Proprietors of the said Canal.
Cupar Judicial Accommodation Act 1835 (repealed)	5 & 6 Will. 4. c. lx	3 July 1835
An Act for providing in or near the Burgh of Cupar more extensive Accommodation for holding the Courts and Meetings of the Sheriff, Justices of the Peace, and Commissioners of Supply of the County of Fife, and for the Custody of the Records of the said County. (Repealed by Local Government (Scotland) Act 1889 (52 & 53 Vict. c. 50))
Ashton-under-Lyne Water Act 1835	5 & 6 Will. 4. c. lxi	3 July 1835
An Act for better supplying with Water the Town of Ashton-under-Lyne, and the Neighbourhood thereof, within the Parish of Ashton-under-Lyne, in the County Palatine of Lancaster.
Edinburgh Turnpike Roads Act 1835	5 & 6 Will. 4. c. lxii	3 July 1835
An Act for more effectually making, repairing, and maintaining the Turnpike Roads in the County of Edinburgh.
Worcester (City) Turnpike Roads Act 1835	5 & 6 Will. 4. c. lxiii	3 July 1835
An Act for improving and more effectually repairing the several Roads leading into and from the City of Worcester.
Sevenoaks, Tunbridge Wells and Woodsgate Roads Act 1835	5 & 6 Will. 4. c. lxiv	3 July 1835
An Act for repairing the Roads from Sevenoaks Common to Woodsgate, Tunbridge Wells, and Kipping's Cross, and from Tunbridge Wells to Woodsgate, in the County of Kent.
Launceston Turnpike Roads Act 1835 (repealed)	5 & 6 Will. 4. c. lxv	3 July 1835
An Act for more effectually repairing the Launceston Turnpike Roads, and making certain additional Roads. (Repealed by Launceston Turnpike Roads Act 1867 (30 & 31 Vict. c. xxxiv))
Harnham Hill, Blandford and Dorchester Road Act 1835 (repealed)	5 & 6 Will. 4. c. lxvi	3 July 1835
An Act for more effectually repairing and improving the Road from the Junction of the Odstock Road with the Downton Road near Harnham Hill, through Blandford and Dorchester, to Askerswell Hill, in the Counties of Wilts and Dorset. (Repealed by Harnham, Blandford and Dorchester Road Act 1866 (29 & 30 Vict. c. cxxiii))
Newry and Charlemont Road Act 1835 (repealed)	5 & 6 Will. 4. c. lxvii	3 July 1835
An Act for more effectually repairing and improving the Road from Newry to Charlemont, through the County of Armagh. (Repealed by Turnpike Trusts Abolition (Ireland) Act 1857 (20 & 21 Vict. c. 16))
Edinburgh Highways and Bridges Act 1835	5 & 6 Will. 4. c. lxviii	3 July 1835
An Act for further regulating the Statute Labour and repairing the Highways and Bridges in the County of Edinburgh.
Oxford Improvement Act 1835 (repealed)	5 & 6 Will. 4. c. lxix	21 July 1835
An Act for continuing the Term and amending and enlarging the Powers of Three Acts (Note: Oxford Improvement Act 1771 (11 Geo. 3. c. 19)) (Note: Oxford Improvement Act 1781 (21 Geo. 3. c. 47)) (Note: Oxford Improvement Act 1812 (52 Geo. 3. c. lxxii)) of His Majesty King George the Third, for amending certain Mileways leading to Oxford, and making Improvements in the University and City of Oxford, the Suburbs thereof, and adjoining Parish of Saint Clement; and for other Purposes in the said Acts mentioned. (Repealed by Local Government Board's Provisional Order Confirmation Act 1889 (52 & 53 Vict. c. xv))
Portland Ferry Act 1835 (repealed)	5 & 6 Will. 4. c. lxx	21 July 1835
An Act for making and maintaining a Bridge over the River called "The Portland Ferry" in the County of Dorset, with proper Approaches thereto. (Repealed by Local Government Board's Provisional Order Confirmation (No. 17) Act 1894 (57 & 58 Vict. c. cxxx))
Itchen Bridge and Roads Act Amendment Act 1835 (repealed)	5 & 6 Will. 4. c. lxxi	21 July 1835
An Act for amending an Act passed in the last Session of Parliament (Note: Itchen Bridge and Roads Act 1834 (4 & 5 Will. 4. c. lxxxv)) for establishing a Floating Bridge over the River Itchen near the Town of Southampton, with proper Approaches thereto, and making Roads to communicate therewith. (Repealed by Southampton Corporation Act 1973 (c. xix))
Tunbridge Wells Improvement Act 1835 (repealed)	5 & 6 Will. 4. c. lxxii	21 July 1835
An Act for lighting, watching, cleansing, regulating, and otherwise improving the Town of Tunbridge Wells in the of Kent and Sussex, and for regulating the Supply of Water and establishing a Market within the said Town. (Repealed by County of Kent Act 1981 (c. xviii))
Haverfordwest, Prendergast and Cartlett Improvement Act 1835 (repealed)	5 & 6 Will. 4. c. lxxiii	21 July 1835
An Act for paving, lighting, and otherwise improving the Town of Haverfordwest, and the adjoining Townships of Prendergast and Cartlett, in the Parishes of Prendergast and Uzmaston, in the County of Pembroke. (Repealed by Dyfed Act 1987 (c. xxiv))
Londonderry Bridge and Improvement Act 1835 (repealed)	5 & 6 Will. 4. c. lxxiv	21 July 1835
An Act to amend several Acts relating to the Bridge and to the City and Port of Londonderry. (Repealed by Londonderry Port and Harbour Act 1854 (17 & 18 Vict. c. clxxvii))
Newport (Monmouthshire) Dock, Railway and Road Act 1835	5 & 6 Will. 4. c. lxxv	21 July 1835
An Act for making and maintaining a Dock and other Works in the Port of Newport in the County of Monmouth, with a Railway and Stone Road therefrom.
Argus Life Assurance Company Act 1835	5 & 6 Will. 4. c. lxxvi	21 July 1835
An Act to enable the Proprietors or Shareholders in the Argus Life Assurance Company to sue and be sued in the Name of any One of the Directors or of the Chairman or Secretary for the Time being of the said Company.
Merthyr Tydfil Markets Act 1835	5 & 6 Will. 4. c. lxxvii	21 July 1835
An Act for providing a Market Place and regulating the Markets in the Town and Borough of Merthyr Tidvil in the County of Glamorgan.
Gourock Harbour Act 1835	5 & 6 Will. 4. c. lxxviii	21 July 1835
An Act for erecting and maintaining a Pier or Harbour at Gourock in the County of Rethrew.
Ayr Harbour Act 1835 (repealed)	5 & 6 Will. 4. c. lxxix	21 July 1835
An Act for the further Improvement of the Harbour of Ayr. (Repealed by Ayr Harbour Act 1855 (18 & 19 Vict. c. cxix))
Paisley Water Act 1835	5 & 6 Will. 4. c. lxxx	21 July 1835
An Act for supplying the Town of Paisley in the County of Renfrew with Water.
Richmond (Surrey) Water Act 1835	5 & 6 Will. 4. c. lxxxi	21 July 1835
An Act for the better supplying the Parish of Richmond in the County of Surrey with Water.
Canterbury and Whitstable Railway Act 1835	5 & 6 Will. 4. c. lxxxii	21 July 1835
An Act for enlarging and amending the Powers and Provisions of the Acts passed for making and maintaining a Railway or Tramroad from the Sea Shore at or near Whitstable in the County of Kent to or near to the City of Canterbury, and the Works connected therewith; and to authorize the Company of Proprietors to raise a further Sum of Money.
Gateshead and Monks Wearmouth Railway Act 1835	5 & 6 Will. 4. c. lxxxiii	21 July 1835
An Act for enabling John Brandling and Robert William Brandling Esquires to purchase and take Leases of Lands and Hereditaments for the Formation of a Railway from Gateshead to South Shields and Monk-Wearmouth, all in the County Palatine of Durham, with Branches therefrom.
Newtyle and Coupar Angus Railway Act 1835	5 & 6 Will. 4. c. lxxxiv	21 July 1835
An Act for making and maintaining a Railway from Newtyle to Coupar Angus in the County of Forfar.
Paisley and Renfrew Railway Act 1835 (repealed)	5 & 6 Will. 4. c. lxxxv	21 July 1835
An Act for making and maintaining a Railway between the Town of Paisley and the South Side of the River Clyde at Renfrew Ferry, and for constructing Wharfs, Quays, or Landing Places there; all in the Counter of Rethrew. (Repealed by Glasgow and South Western Railway Consolidation Act 1855 (18 & 19 Vict. c. xcvii))
Leeds Gas Act 1835 (repealed)	5 & 6 Will. 4. c. lxxxvi	21 July 1835
An Act for better lighting with Gas the Town and Neighbourhood of Leeds in the Borough of Leeds in the West Riding of the County of York. (Repealed by Leeds New Gas Company's Act 1854 (17 & 18 Vict. c. iv))
Garscube and Glasgow Road Act 1835	5 & 6 Will. 4. c. lxxxvii	21 July 1835
An Act for altering the Line of Road from the Milnford of Garscube to the City of Glasgow, and improving the Roads leading therefrom into the said City.
Flint and Chester Roads and Lower King's Ferry Act 1835	5 & 6 Will. 4. c. lxxxviii	21 July 1835
An Act for improving and keeping in repair certain Roads in the Counties of Flint and Chester, and for better maintaining the Ferry over the River Dee called the Lower Kings Ferry, in the said County of Flint.
Road from Burbage to Narborough Act 1835	5 & 6 Will. 4. c. lxxxix	21 July 1835
An Act for more effectually repairing and improving the Road from the Side Gate on the Hinckley and Lutterworth Turnpike Road in the Parish of Burbage in the County of Leicester to the Leicester Turnpike Road in or near to the Village of Narborough in the said County.
Southend Pier Act 1835 (repealed)	5 & 6 Will. 4. c. xc	30 July 1835
An Act to explain and amend the Powers of an Act of His late Majesty King George the Fourth, (Note: Southend Pier Act 1829 (10 Geo. 4. c. xlix)) for making a Pier at Southend in the County of Essex. (Repealed by Essex Act 1987 (c. xx))
Sheffield Gas Act 1835 (repealed)	5 & 6 Will. 4. c. xci	30 July 1835
An Act for better lighting with Gas the Borough of Sheffield in the West Riding of the County of York. (Repealed by Sheffield United Gas Light Company Act 1844 (7 & 8 Vict. c. xlv))
Newtyle and Glammis Railway Act 1835	5 & 6 Will. 4. c. xcii	30 July 1835
An Act for making and maintaining a Railway from Newtyle to the Muir of Eassie, and from thence to the Muir of Glammiss, in the County of Forfar.
Bodmin and Wadebridge Railway Act 1835	5 & 6 Will. 4. c. xciii	30 July 1835
An Act to amend an Act (Note: Bodmin and Wadebridge Railway Act 1832 (2 & 3 Will. 4. c. xlvii)) relating to the Bodmin and Wadebridge Railway.
City of London Court of Requests Act 1835 or the City of London (Small Debts) Act 1835 (repealed)	5 & 6 Will. 4. c. xciv	21 August 1835
An Act for amending and consolidating the Acts of Parliament for the Recovery of Small Debts in the City of London and the Liberties thereof, and for enabling the Goods of the Debtors to be taken in Execution. (Repealed by London (City) Small Debts Act 1847 (10 & 11 Vict. c. lxxi))
Grand Junction Waterworks Company Act 1835	5 & 6 Will. 4. c. xcv	21 August 1835
An Act to amend and extend the Powers vested in the Grand Junction Waterworks Company, and for other Purposes relating thereto.
Llanelly Railway and Dock Company Act 1835	5 & 6 Will. 4. c. xcvi	21 August 1835
An Act to authorize the Llanelly Railway and Dock Company to make certain additional Railways or Tramroads, and for other Purposes connected therewith.
Ballochney Railway Act 1835	5 & 6 Will. 4. c. xcvii	21 August 1835
An Act for effecting an Extension of the Ballochney Railway, in the County of Lanark; and for altering, amending, and enlarging the Powers of an Act of the Seventh Year of His late Majesty, (Note: Ballochney Railway Act 1826 (7 Geo. 4. c. xlviii)) for making the said Railway.
Exeter Water Act 1835	5 & 6 Will. 4. c. xcviii	21 August 1835
An Act to amend an Act of the Third Year of His present Majesty, (Note: Exeter Water Act 1833 (3 & 4 Will. 4. c. xxxii)) for more effectually supplying with Water the City and County of the City of Exeter and Places adjacent thereto.
Reading Water Act 1835 (repealed)	5 & 6 Will. 4. c. xcix	21 August 1835
An Act to enable the Beading Waterworks Company to extend their Works; and for explaining and enlarging the Powers of the Act (Note: Reading Water Act 1826 (7 Geo. 4. c. xxxiii)) relating to such Company. (Repealed by Reading and Berkshire Water, &c. Act 1959 (7 & 8 Eliz. 2. c. xxxiii))
Truro Improvement Act 1835	5 & 6 Will. 4. c. c	21 August 1835
An Act for the better paving, lighting, watching, cleansing, and otherwise improving the Borough of Truro in the County of Cornwall, and for forming a new Street within the same Borough.
Bognor Improvement Act 1835	5 & 6 Will. 4. c. ci	21 August 1835
An Act for paving, lighting, watching, and otherwise improving the Town of Bognor in the County of Sussex; and for amending and enlarging Two Acts of Parliament passed in the Third (Note: Bognor Market and Roads Act 1822 (3 Geo. 4. c. lvii)) and Sixth (Note: Bognor Improvement and Market Act 1825 (6 Geo. 4. c. cxxxv)) Years of the Reign of His late Majesty King George the Fourth, relating to the said Town.
Willington Trent Bridge Act 1835	5 & 6 Will. 4. c. cii	21 August 1835
An Act for building a Bridge over the River Trent at Willington in the County of Derby.
Oxford, Fifield and Witney Roads Act 1835 (repealed)	5 & 6 Will. 4. c. ciii	21 August 1835
An Act for repairing and otherwise improving the Roads from Oxford, over Botley Causeway, to Fifield in the County of Berks and Witney in the County of Oxford. (Repealed by Statute Law (Repeals) Act 2013 (c. 2))
Totnes and Bridgetown Roads and Bridges Amendment Act 1835	5 & 6 Will. 4. c. civ	21 August 1835
An Act to rectify a Mistake in an Act passed in the present Session of Parliament, (Note: Totnes and Bridgetown Roads and Bridges Act 1835 (5 & 6 Will. 4. c. xxvi)) for more effectually repairing the Road from the Exeter Turnpike Road to Biddaford, and certain Roads leading from Bridgetown Pomeroy and Totnes, and other Roads communicating therewith, and for repairing Totnes Bridge, and erecting Bridges over the Stover Canal, the Rivers Teign and Lemon, and the Mill Leat, all in the County of Devon.
Bodmin Roads Act 1835 (repealed)	5 & 6 Will. 4. c. cv	21 August 1835
An Act for more effectually repairing certain Roads leading to and from Bodmin, and other Roads therein mentioned, in the County of Cornwall, and for making and maintaining certain new Roads communicating therewith. (Repealed by Bodmin Turnpike Roads Act 1866 (29 & 30 Vict. c. cxl))
Court of Chancery (Improvement of Offices) Act 1835 (repealed)	5 & 6 Will. 4. c. cvi	21 August 1835
An Act for the Improvement of the Registrar's Office and other Offices of the Court of Chancery. (Repealed by Statute Law (Repeals) Act 2008 (c. 12))
Great Western Railway Act 1835	5 & 6 Will. 4. c. cvii	31 August 1835
An Act for making a Railway from Bristol to join the London and Birmingham Railway near London, to be called "The Great Western Railway," with Branches therefrom to the Towns of Bradford and Trowbridge in the County of Wilts.
Tormoham (Devon) Improvement (No. 2) Act 1835	5 & 6 Will. 4. c. cviii	31 August 1835
An Act to rectify a Mistake in an Act passed in the present Session of Parliament, (Note: Tormoham Improvement Act 1835 (5 & 6 Will. 4. c. xlv)) for lighting, watching, and improving the Parish of Tormoham, in the County of Devon.
Port Dundas and Glasgow Roads Act 1835	5 & 6 Will. 4. c. cix	31 August 1835
An Act to improve and maintain the Port Dundas Road, and to make and maintain another Road, in the County of Lanark.
North American Colonial Association of Ireland Act 1835	5 & 6 Will. 4. c. cx	9 September 1835
An Act for incorporating and granting certain Powers to the North American Colonial Association of Ireland.
St. Mary Islington Cattle Market Act 1835 (repealed)	5 & 6 Will. 4. c. cxi	9 September 1835
An Act for establishing a Market for the Sale of Cattle in the Parish of Saint Mary Islington in the County of Middlesex. (Repealed by Islington Market Repeal Act 1854 (17 & 18 Vict. c. lxiii))
Belfast and Cave Hill Railway Act 1835	5 & 6 Will. 4. c. cxii	9 September 1835
An Act to alter, amend, and enlarge the Powers of an Act of the Second and Third Years of His present Majesty, (Note: Belfast and Cavehill Railway Act 1832 (2 & 3 Will. 4. c. xxxv)) for making and maintaining a Railway from the Cave Hill to the Harbour of Belfast in the County of Antrim.

=== Private acts ===
Short title	Citation	Royal assent
Long title
Knowles's Estate Act 1835	5 & 6 Will. 4. c. 1 Pr.	3 July 1835
An Act for vesting in George Knowles Esquire and his Heirs certain Freehold and Copyhold Estates situate at Sharow in the Parish of Ripon in the County of York, discharged from the Uses mentioned or referred to by the Marriage Settlement of the said George Knowles, and for substituting and settling certain Freehold and Copyhold Estates situate at Hwmberstone Bank and Thruscross in the Parish of Hampsthwaite in the said County of York in lieu thereof, and to the like Uses.
Hambly's Estate Act 1835	5 & 6 Will. 4. c. 2 Pr.	3 July 1835
An Act for vesting certain Freehold and Leasehold Hereditaments situate in the Town and County of the Town of Southampton, devised and bequeathed by the Will of Ann Hambly Widow, deceased, in Trustees for Sale; and for laying out the Monies to be produced by such Sale in the Purchase of ether Estates, to be settled in the same Manner.
Bisshopp's Estate Act 1835	5 & 6 Will. 4. c. 3 Pr.	3 July 1835
An Act for vesting certain Shares of Estates now belonging to Sir Cecil Augustus Bisshopp, Harriet Arabella Bisshopp, George Curzon Bisshopp, Edward Cecil Bisshopp, and Catherine Mary Bisshopp, Infants, and also to the said Sir Cecil Augustus Bisshopp alone, in Trustees, to be sold, and for investing the Purchase Monies arising from such Shares in other Estates.
Campbell's Estate Act 1835	5 & 6 Will. 4. c. 4 Pr.	3 July 1835
An Act for applying the Balance now lying in Bank of the Price of the Lands of Glenkinglas and others, contained in a Deed of Entail executed by the deceased Sir Duncan Campbell of Lochnell, which were sold in virtue of the Powers contained in an Act of Parliament passed in the Forty-ninth Year of the Reign of His late Majesty King George the Third, (Note: Sir Duncan Campbell's Estate Act 1809 (49 Geo. 3. c. 30 Pr.)) towards Payment of certain Sums laid out by General Duncan Campbell of Lochnell in the Improvement of the said entailed Estate.
Harris's Estate Act 1835	5 & 6 Will. 4. c. 5 Pr.	3 July 1835
An Act to enable the granting of Leases, and for other Purposes relating to the Estates of William Harris Esquire, deceased.
Smart's Estate Act 1835	5 & 6 Will. 4. c. 6 Pr.	3 July 1835
An Act for confirming a Partition, made under a Decree of His Majesty's High Court of Chancery, of an Estate in the County of Chester among Whitmore Smarts Elizabeth Smart Spinster, and others.
Earl of Masserene's Estate Act 1835	5 & 6 Will. 4. c. 7 Pr.	3 July 1835
An Act for the Sale of Estates in Ireland devised by the Will of the Right Honourable Chichester late Earl of Massereene, and for the Purchase of other Estates in Ireland, to be settled to the Uses of the said Will.
Moncrieff's Estate Act 1835	5 & 6 Will. 4. c. 8 Pr.	3 July 1835
An Act for authorizing the Sale of the entailed Lands of North Ferryhill or Carlingnose in the County of Fife, and the entailed Lands and Estate of Kirkton and Whitelaw in the County of Linlithgow, belonging to William Scott Moncrieff Esquire, and the Purchase of other Lands, to be entailed.
Lord Cholmondeley's Estate Act 1835	5 & 6 Will. 4. c. 9 Pr.	3 July 1835
An Act for exchanging the Broomsthorpe and Castle Rising Estates in the County of Norfolk, devised by the Will of George James late Marquis of Cholmondeley deceased to Lord William Henry Hugh Cholmondeley for Life, with Remainders over, for Lands in Netherton and Huxley in the County Palatine of Chester, devised by the same Will to the said Lord William Henry Hugh Cholmondeley in Fee Simple.
Tavistock Inclosure Act 1835	5 & 6 Will. 4. c. 10 Pr.	3 July 1835
An Act for inclosing Lands in the Parishes of Tavistock, Milton-Abbot, Brentnor, and Lamerton, in the County of Devon, called Heathfield.
Ulleskelf Inclosure Act 1835	5 & 6 Will. 4. c. 11 Pr.	3 July 1835
An Act for inclosing Lands in the Manor and Township of Ulleskelf in the Parish of Kirby Wharfe in the County of York.
Acton (Ranmore) Inclosure Act 1835	5 & 6 Will. 4. c. 12 Pr.	21 July 1835
An Act for dividing, allotting, and inclosing the Commons or Waste Lands called Ranmore otherwise Ravensmoor, in the several Parishes of Acton and Baddiley, or One of them, in the County of Chester.
Stretham Inclosure Act 1835	5 & 6 Will. 4. c. 13 Pr.	21 July 1835
An Act for inclosing and allotting Lands in the Parish of Stretham in the Isle of Ely and County of Cambridge, and for the Commutation of Tithes.
Wise's Estate Act 1835	5 & 6 Will. 4. c. 14 Pr.	21 July 1835
An Act for authorizing Sales, Leases, Grants, and Improvements of an Estate at Lillington in the County of Warwick, devised by the Will of Matthew Wise Esquire; and for other Purposes.
McDougall's Estate Act 1835	5 & 6 Will. 4. c. 15 Pr.	21 July 1835
An Act to empower the Judges of the Court of Session in Scotland to sell the Lands of Bravelleichs in the County of Argyll, and, after discharging the Debts affecting the same, to invest the Surplus in the Purchase of other Lands, to be entailed.
Highleigh Estate Act 1835	5 & 6 Will. 4. c. 16 Pr.	21 July 1835
An Act to enable the Prebendary of the Prebend of Highleigh, founded in the Cathedral Church of the Holy Trinity of Chichester, to accept Surrenders of the existing Lease of any Part of the said Prebend, and to grant new leases thereof.
Graham's Estate Act 1835	5 & 6 Will. 4. c. 17 Pr.	21 July 1835
An Act for confirming certain Leases granted by Sir James Graham Baronet, deceased, and by Sir Sandford Graham Baronet, his Son, of Land at Kirkstall and in the Township of Headingley-cum-Burley, in the Parish of Leeds in the West Riding of the County of York.
Starkie's Estate Act 1835	5 & 6 Will. 4. c. 18 Pr.	21 July 1835
An Act for enabling the Committee of the Estate of Le Gendre Pierce Starkie Esquire, a Lunatic, to grant Leases of his settled Estates.
Mackenzie's Estate Act 1835	5 & 6 Will. 4. c. 19 Pr.	21 July 1835
An Act to vest Part of the entailed Estate of Cromarty, lying within the County of Ross, and by Annexation within the County of Cromarty, in Trustees in Fee Simple, for the Purpose of selling the same, and of paying Debts which affect or may be made to affect the said entailed Estate; and for other Purposes connected therewith.
Lord Douglas's Estate Act 1835	5 & 6 Will. 4. c. 20 Pr.	21 July 1835
An Act for vesting in Archibald Lord Douglas of Douglas, or the Heir of Entail in Possession for the Time, certain detached Parts of the entailed Estates of Douglas in Fee Simple, upon entailing certain other Lands equivalent in Value to the same and to a Debt due by him to the said entailed Estates.
Earl of Chichester's Estate Act 1835	5 & 6 Will. 4. c. 21 Pr.	21 July 1835
An Act for uniting the Rectory and Parish Church of Stanmer in the County of Sussex with the adjoining Vicarage and Parish Church of Falmer, and for exchanging the Parsonage House and Glebe Land of Stanmer and the Vicarage House of Falmer, for certain Pieces of Land at Falmer, being Part of the settled Estates of the Right Honourable Henry Thomas Earl of Chichester, on which a new Parsonage House has been built at the Expence of the said Earl.
Worcester County Infirmary Estate Act 1835	5 & 6 Will. 4. c. 22 Pr.	21 July 1835
An Act to enable the Mayor, Aldermen, and Citizens of the City of Worcester to grant renewable Leases of the Worcester County Infirmary and of the Land held therewith to the Governors of the said Infirmary, or their Trustees.
Spencer's Estate Act 1835	5 & 6 Will. 4. c. 23 Pr.	21 July 1835
An Act for vesting the settled and unsettled Manors and Estates of Charles Vere Spencer, an Infant, in the Counties of Oxford and Denbigh, in Trustees, in order to effect the Sale thereof, for the Payment of Incumbrances, and for other Purposes.
Earl of Orford's Estate Act 1835	5 & 6 Will. 4. c. 24 Pr.	21 August 1835
An Act for empowering Trustees to sell certain Freehold, Copyhold, and Leasehold Estates in the County of Norfolk, settled under the Will of Horatio Earl of Orford deceased, and for laying out the Money arising therefrom in the Purchase of Lands to be settled to the same Uses; and for the other Purposes therein mentioned.
Wolverhampton Curacy Estate Act 1835	5 & 6 Will. 4. c. 25 Pr.	21 August 1835
An Act to authorize the making of Grants or Leases of Mines within and under Parts of the Lands belonging to the Perpetual Curacy of the Parish of Wolverhampton in the County of Stafford.
Sparrow's Estate Act 1835	5 & 6 Will. 4. c. 26 Pr.	25 August 1835
An Act for vesting the Freehold and Leasehold Estates late belonging to Richard Sparrow of Oakland in the County of Tipperary, Esquire, deceased, in Trustees, to be sold for Payment of his Debts, and applying the Surplus for the Benefit of the Devisees in the Will of the said Deceased named.
Earl Nelson's Estate Act 1835	5 & 6 Will. 4. c. 27 Pr.	31 August 1835
An Act for raising, on the Security of certain Estates in the County of Wilts whereof the Right Honourable Thomas Earl Nelson is Tenant in Tail, a Sum of Money for the Purpose of discharging the Sum of Ten thousand Pounds equitably charged thereon by William Earl Nelson deceased, in favour of his Daughter Charlotte Mary Lady Bridport; and for other Purposes.
Schwabe's Naturalization Act 1835 (Note: This act was not printed by the King's Printer.)	5 & 6 Will. 4. c. 28 Pr.	13 April 1835
An Act for naturalizing Salis Schwabe.
Conyers's Divorce Act 1835	5 & 6 Will. 4. c. 29 Pr.	12 June 1835
An Act to dissolve the Marriage of Charles Conyers junior, Esquire, with Margaret Conyers his now Wife, and to enable him to marry again; and for other Purposes therein mentioned.
Allhusen's Naturalization Act 1835	5 & 6 Will. 4. c. 30 Pr.	12 June 1835
An Act for naturalizing Christian Allhusen.
Cortazzi's Naturalization Act 1835	5 & 6 Will. 4. c. 31 Pr.	12 June 1835
An Act for naturalizing John Cortazzi.
Willert's Naturalization Act 1835	5 & 6 Will. 4. c. 32 Pr.	12 June 1835
An Act for naturalizing Paul Ferdinand Willert.
Magnus's Naturalization Act 1835	5 & 6 Will. 4. c. 33 Pr.	12 June 1835
An Act for naturalizing Louis Magnus.
Miéville's Naturalization Act 1835	5 & 6 Will. 4. c. 34 Pr.	12 June 1835
An Act for naturalizing Frederic Louis Miéville.
Albrecht's Naturalization Act 1835	5 & 6 Will. 4. c. 35 Pr.	12 June 1835
An Act for naturalizing Mendel Albrecht.
Loewe's Naturalization Act 1835	5 & 6 Will. 4. c. 36 Pr.	12 June 1835
An Act for naturalizing David Meyer Loewe.
Moor's Divorce Act 1835	5 & 6 Will. 4. c. 37 Pr.	3 July 1835
An Act to dissolve the Marriage of Major Hassell Richard Moor with Ann his now Wife, and to enable him to marry again; and for other Purposes therein mentioned.
Blenkinsop's Divorce Act 1835	5 & 6 Will. 4. c. 38 Pr.	3 July 1835
An Act to dissolve the Marriage of the Reverend William Thomas Blenkinsop, a Chaplain in the Service of the East India Company on their Madras Establishment, with Clara Jane his now Wife, and to enable him to marry again; and for other Purposes therein mentioned.
Murat's Naturalization Act 1835	5 & 6 Will. 4. c. 39 Pr.	3 July 1835
An Act for naturalizing John Queriol Murat.
Steinthal's Naturalization Act 1835	5 & 6 Will. 4. c. 40 Pr.	3 July 1835
An Act for naturalizing Ludwig Steinthal.
Hallé's Naturalization Act 1835	5 & 6 Will. 4. c. 41 Pr.	3 July 1835
An Act for naturalizing Emanuel Hallé.
Arabet's Naturalization Act 1835	5 & 6 Will. 4. c. 42 Pr.	3 July 1835
An Act for naturalizing Caspar Peter Elias Baron de Arabet,
De la Tour's Naturalization Act 1835	5 & 6 Will. 4. c. 43 Pr.	3 July 1835
An Act for naturalizing Jacques Louis Augusts Joseph Des Champs de la Tour, commonly called Auguste Des Champs de la Tour, and his infant Son.
De Tressan's Naturalization Act 1835	5 & 6 Will. 4. c. 44 Pr.	21 July 1835
An Act for naturalizing Agnes Hemilian de Tressan.
Lambert's Divorce Act 1835	5 & 6 Will. 4. c. 45 Pr.	30 July 1835
An Act to dissolve the Marriage of William Charles Lambert Esquire with Georgiana Charlotte his now Wife, and to enable him to marry again; and for other Purposes therein mentioned.
Bergman's Naturalization Act 1835	5 & 6 Will. 4. c. 46 Pr.	30 July 1835
An Act for naturalizing Henry Christopher Bergman.
Zoller's Naturalization Act 1835	5 & 6 Will. 4. c. 47 Pr.	21 August 1835
An Act for naturalizing John Frederick Zoller.
Malpas's Divorce Act 1835	5 & 6 Will. 4. c. 48 Pr.	25 August 1835
An Act to dissolve the Marriage of Charles Malpas Esquire with Isabella Bowness his now Wife, and to enable him to marry again; and for other Purposes therein mentioned.

=== Sources ===
- The Statutes of the United Kingdom of Great Britain and Ireland, 5 & 6 William IV. 1835. 1835 – via Internet Archive.
- The Statutes of the United Kingdom of Great Britain and Ireland, 5 & 6 William IV. 1835. 1835 – via Google Books.
- A Collection of the Public General Statutes passed in the Fifth and Sixth Year of his Majesty King William the Fourth. 1835 – via Internet Archive.
- A Collection of the Public General Statutes passed in the Fifth and Sixth Year of his Majesty King William the Fourth. 1835 – via Internet Archive.
- Journal of the House of Commons (PDF). Vol. 90. London: His Majesty's Stationery Office. pp. 3–662 – via parliament.uk.
- Chronological Table of and Index to the Statutes. Vol. 1: To the End of the Session 59 Vict. Sess. 2 (1895) (13th ed.). London: Her Majesty's Stationery Office. 1896. pp. 277–281 – via Google Books.

== See also ==
- List of acts of the Parliament of the United Kingdom
