= Madhouses Act 1774 =

Act of the Parliament of Great Britain regulating "madhouses"

- Act of Parliament
- Parliament of Great Britain
- Long title: An Act for regulating Madhouses.
- Citation: 14 Geo. 3. c. 49
- Introduced by: Thomas Townshend (Commons)
- Territorial extent: England and Wales (Note: Section 1.)

Dates
- Royal assent: 20 May 1774
- Commencement: 20 November 1774
- Repealed: 21 August 1871
Other legislation
Amended by	Madhouses Act 1779; Madhouses Act 1786; Madhouse Act 1828
Repealed by	Statute Law Revision Act 1871

Status: Repealed

Text of statute as originally enacted

The Madhouses Act 1774 (14 Geo. 3. c. 49) was an act of the Parliament of Great Britain, which set out a legal framework for regulating "madhouses" (so-called lunatic asylums).

== Background ==
By the mid-eighteenth century, the common methods in the United Kingdom for dealing with the insane were either to keep them in the family home, or to put them in a "madhouse", which was simply a private house whose proprietor was paid to detain their residents, and ran it as a commercial concern with little or no medical involvement. This led to two forms of abuse: the first was the keeping of "legitimately" insane people in atrocious conditions, and the second the detention of those who were falsely claimed to be insane – in effect, private imprisonment.

At this stage, there was no legislation to regulate the incarceration of anyone other than a Chancery lunatic or a pauper; there was only a vaguely defined common law power to "confine a person disordered in mind, who seems disposed to do mischief to himself, or another person".

In a case in the mid-1750s, a woman came to suspect that her son-in-law had committed his wife to a madhouse in Hoxton; with the aid of a justice of the peace, she secured the release of her daughter after obtaining a confession from the husband. A similar case in 1762 saw a man trying to obtain the release of an acquaintance, one Mrs Hawley, who he suspected had been confined in a madhouse. His initial application to Lord Mansfield for a writ of habeas corpus was rejected because he was not a relative and so had no standing, but the judge arranged for a doctor to visit the house and speak to the woman. On his report, a writ was granted; she was brought before the court, and discharged.

A Select Committee of the House of Commons, chaired by Thomas Townshend, was set up in 1763 to study the problem of unlawful detention in private madhouses and focused on the Hawley case. It found that she had been committed to the house solely on the word of her husband, who paid two guineas (two pounds and two shillings) a month for her board, and that she was unable to leave the house or communicate with anybody outside it. The inmates were treated as insane, but the agent who arranged their entry freely admitted that he had not committed a single insane person to the house in the past six years. No-one who would pay was turned away, no physicians attended the inmates, and no register was kept of their names. This was, the committee stated, a common situation; they noted that a number of similar cases could have been studied, and they recommended that some form of legislative intervention was needed. The Commons ordered the committee to prepare a bill, but it appears this was never brought in.

The issue was next addressed in 1773 when Townshend's son, also named Thomas Townshend, sponsored a bill to regulate private madhouses; within seven miles of London, this would be the responsibility of the Royal College of Physicians; and outside that, magistrates in county towns. The bill passed the Commons but was rejected by the Lords.

== Legislative history ==
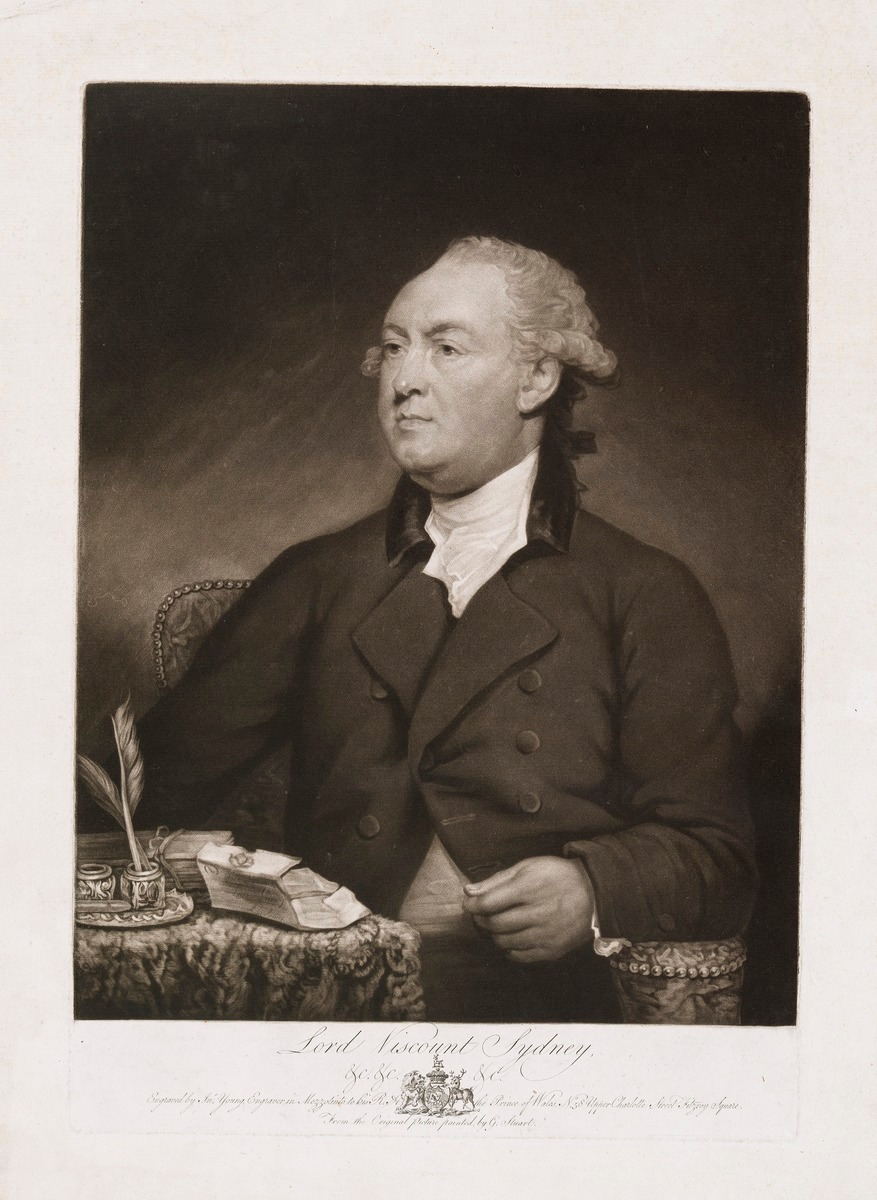
Thomas Townshend (the younger); a contemporary engraving

In 1774, Thomas Townshend again reintroduced the Madhouses Bill. The Bill was presented to the Commons for its first reading on 2 March, and was amended in committee on 23 March. The Lords voted on it on 21 April, and made two amendments (the addition of s.19 and s.31) on 6 May, before the bill returned to the Commons on 10 May. The bill received royal assent on 20 May.

== Provisions ==
The act required that all madhouses be licensed by a committee of the Royal College of Physicians. This license would permit the holder to maintain a single house for accommodating lunatics, and would have to be renewed each year. All houses were to be inspected at least once per year by the committee, who would also keep a central register of all the confined lunatics in order that people could locate them; outside London, the task of inspecting them would fall to the local quarter sessions.

The penalty for "concealing or confining" more than one insane person without a license was set at £500, and every keeper of such a house who took in a patient without an order from a doctor was liable to a fine of £100.

== Implementation ==
Madhouses Act 1779
- Act of Parliament
- Parliament of Great Britain
- Long title: An Act to continue an Act made in the Fourteenth Year of the Reign of His present Majesty, intituled, "An Act for regulating Madhouses," for a further Time therein limited.
- Citation: 19 Geo. 3. c. 15
- Territorial extent: Great Britain

Dates
- Royal assent: 16 March 1779
- Commencement: 26 November 1778 (Note: Start of session.)
- Repealed: 15 July 1828
Other legislation
Amends	Madhouses Act 1774
Repealed by	Madhouse Act 1828
Relates to	Madhouses Act 1786

Status: Repealed

Text of statute as originally enacted

Madhouses Act 1786
- Act of Parliament
- Parliament of Great Britain
- Long title: An Act for making perpetual an Act made in the Fourteenth Year of the Reign of His present Majesty, intituled, "An Act for regulating Madhouses."
- Citation: 26 Geo. 3. c. 91
- Territorial extent: Great Britain

Dates
- Royal assent: 4 July 1786
- Commencement: 24 January 1786
- Repealed: 6 August 1861
Other legislation
Amends	Madhouses Act 1774
Amended by	Madhouse Act 1828
Repealed by	Statute Law Revision Act 1861
Relates to	Madhouses Act 1779

Status: Repealed

Text of statute as originally enacted

The act took effect on 20 November 1774, six months after receiving royal assent, and was originally stated to remain in force for five years and then until the end of the next parliamentary session. It was continued for a further seven years by the Madhouses Act 1779 (19 Geo. 3. c. 15), and then continued indefinitely by the Madhouses Act 1786 (26 Geo. 3. c. 91); it remained in force until repealed by the Madhouse Act 1828.

== Subsequent developments ==
The whole act was repealed by section 1 of the Madhouse Act 1828 (9 Geo. 4. c. 41), which came into force on 1 August 1828 but expired on 16 August 1832. The repeal of that act by the Insane Persons (England) Act 1832 (2 & 3 Will. 4. c. 107) did not contain a saving for the repeals.

The whole act was repealed by section 1 of, and the schedule to, the Statute Law Revision Act 1871 (34 & 35 Vict. c. 116), which came into force on 21 August 1871.

== Bibliography ==
- Annual Register for the year 1774. London: printed for J. Dodsley, 1778. Second edition.
- Roberts, Andrew. The Lunacy Commission

- Section 2: The 1774 Madhouses Act: 14 George 2, chapter 26. A summary and analysis
- Section 2.3: The 1763 Committee on Madhouses and the 1774 Madhouses Act
- Section 7: Chronological and alphabetical bibliographies of lunacy

- Unsworth, Cliver (1991). "Mental Disorder and the Tutelary Relationship: From Pre- to Post-Carceral Legal Order". Journal of Law and Society. 18 (2): 254–278. doi:10.2307/1410140. JSTOR 1410140.
