= County Asylums Act 1808 =

Act of the Parliament of the United Kingdom

- Act of Parliament
- Parliament of the United Kingdom
- Long title: An Act for the better Care and Maintenance of Lunaticks, being Paupers or Criminals in England.
- Citation: 48 Geo. 3. c. 96
- Territorial extent: United Kingdom

Dates
- Royal assent: 23 June 1808
- Commencement: 23 June 1808 (Note: The Acts of Parliament (Commencement) Act 1793.)
- Repealed: 15 July 1828
Other legislation
Amended by	Lunatic Paupers, etc. (England) Act 1811; Pauper, etc., Lunatics (England) Act 1815
Repealed by	County Asylums Act 1828
Relates to	County Asylums Act 1845

Status: Repealed

Text of statute as originally enacted

The County Asylums Act 1808 (48 Geo. 3. c. 96), also known as the Lunatic Paupers or Criminals Act 1808 or Wynn's Act, was an act of the Parliament of the United Kingdom formed mental health law in England and Wales from 1808 to 1828. The act was replaced by the County Asylums Act 1828 (9 Geo. 4. c. 40), which formed mental health law in England and Wales until 1845. Notably, the act established public mental asylums in Britain that could be operated by the county government. It permitted, but did not compel, justices of the peace to provide establishments for the care of pauper lunatics, so that they could be removed from workhouses and prisons.

The act is also known as Mr. Wynn's Act, after Charles Watkin Williams-Wynn, a Welsh member of parliament for Montgomeryshire, who promoted the act.

== Subsequent developments ==
The whole act was repealed by section 1 of the County Asylums Act 1828 (9 Geo. 4. c. 40), which came into force on 15 July 1828.

== See also ==
- County Asylums Act 1828
- County Asylums Act 1845
- List of asylums commissioned in England and Wales
