= County Lunatic Asylums (England) Act 1828 =

Act of the Parliament of the United Kingdom

- Act of Parliament
- Parliament of the United Kingdom
- Long title: An Act to amend the Laws for the Erection and Regulation of County Lunatic Asylums. And more effectually to provide for the care and maintenance of Pauper and Criminal Lunatics in England.
- Citation: 9 Geo. 4. c. 40
- Territorial extent: United Kingdom

Dates
- Royal assent: 15 July 1828
- Commencement: 15 July 1828 (Note: The Acts of Parliament (Commencement) Act 1793.)
- Repealed: 11 October 1832
Other legislation
Amends	Justices Commitment Act 1743
Repeals/revokes	County Asylums Act 1808; Lunatic Paupers, etc. (England) Act 1811; Pauper, etc., Lunatics (England) Act 1815; Custody of Insane Persons Act 1816; Pauper Lunatics (England) Act 1819; Maintenance of Lunatics Act 1824
Repealed by	County Asylums Act 1845
Relates to	Madhouse Act 1828

Status: Repealed

Text of statute as originally enacted

The County Lunatic Asylums (England) Act 1828 (9 Geo. 4. c. 40), also known as the County Asylums Act 1828, was an act of the Parliament of the United Kingdom that addressed concerns with the administration of asylums and the slow creation of county asylums within Britain. It required magistrates to send annual records of admissions, discharges, and deaths to the Home Office; and allowed the Secretary of State to send a Visiting Justice to any county asylum, although the visitor couldn't intervene in how the asylum was run. It also allowed counties to borrow money to build an asylum, but it had to be paid back within 14 years of the initial loan. This was designed to incentivise counties to build asylums, but it did not make it compulsory, a continuation of the County Asylums Act 1808 (48 Geo. 3. c. 96). It also imposed the requirement of a residential medical officer, whose permission was necessary to justify the restraint of a patient.

== Background ==
Issues of mistreatment and abuse, raised in a 1817 select committee report, quickened reform, leading to the act.

At the time of royal assent, nine county asylums had been established in England, and the need for more was growing due to overcrowding in public or charity asylums like St. Luke's Hospital for Lunatics and Bethlem Royal Hospital.

== Provisions ==
=== Repealed enactments ===
Section 1 of the act repealed sections 20 and 21 of the Justices Commitment Act 1743 (17 Geo. 2. c. 5), the County Asylums Act 1808 (48 Geo. 3. c. 96), the Lunatic Paupers, etc. (England) Act 1811 (51 Geo. 3. c. 79), the Pauper, etc., Lunatics (England) Act 1815 (55 Geo. 3. c. 46), the Custody of Insane Persons Act 1816 (56 Geo. 3. c. 117), the Pauper Lunatics (England) Act 1819 (59 Geo. 3. c. 127) and the Maintenance of Lunatics Act 1824 (5 Geo. 4. c. 51).

== Subsequent developments ==
The whole act was repealed by section 1 of the County Asylums Act 1845 (8 & 9 Vict. c. 126), which came into force on 4 August 1845.

== See also ==
- County Asylums Act 1808
- County Asylums Act 1845
