= Madhouse Act 1828 =

Act of the Parliament of the United Kingdom

- Act of Parliament
- Parliament of the United Kingdom
- Long title: An Act to regulate the Care and Treatment of Insane Persons in England.
- Citation: 9 Geo. 4. c. 41
- Territorial extent: United Kingdom

Dates
- Royal assent: 15 July 1828
- Commencement: 1 August 1828 (Note: Section 54.)
- Expired: 16 August 1832 (Note: Section 54. The end of the next session of Parliament after 1 August 1831)
- Repealed: 11 August 1832
Other legislation
Repeals/revokes	See § Repealed enactments
Amended by	Care, etc., of Lunatics Act 1829
Repealed by	Insane Persons (England) Act 1832

Status: Repealed

Text of statute as originally enacted

The Madhouse Act 1828 (9 Geo. 4. c. 41) was an act of the Parliament of the United Kingdom that regulated the licensing of madhouses and the care and treatment of insane persons in England.

== Provisions ==
=== Repealed enactments ===
Section 1 of the act repealed 3 enactments, listed in that section. The repeal did not affect proceedings under any of the repealed acts that had commenced before the passing of the act, which could be continued and proceeded in under the authority of either the repealed acts or this act, as was most expedient.

Citation	Short title	Description	Extent of repeal
14 Geo. 3. c. 49	Madhouses Act 1774	An Act for regulating Madhouses.	The whole act.
19 Geo. 3. c. 15	Madhouses Act 1779	An Act to continue an Act made in the Fourteenth Year of the Reign of His present Majesty, intituled 'An Act for regulating Madhouses,' for a further Time therein limited.	The whole act.
26 Geo. 3. c. 91	Madhouses Act 1786	An Act for making perpetual an Act made in the Fourteenth Year of the Reign of His present Majesty, intituled 'An Act for regulating Madhouses.'	The whole act.

== Subsequent developments ==
The act was amended by the Care, etc., of Lunatics Act 1829 (10 Geo. 4. c. 18).

The whole act was repealed by section 1 of the Insane Persons (England) Act 1832 (2 & 3 Will. 4. c. 107), which came into force on 11 August 1832.

The repeal of the act by the Insane Persons (England) Act 1832 (2 & 3 Will. 4. c. 107) did not contain a saving for the repeals, meaning that the acts repealed by the act were repealed by subsequent statute law revision acts, including the Statute Law Revision Act 1861 (24 & 25 Vict. c. 101) and the Statute Law Revision Act 1871 (34 & 35 Vict. c. 116).
