= List of acts of the Parliament of the United Kingdom from 1828 =

This is a complete list of acts of the Parliament of the United Kingdom for the year 1828.

Note that the first parliament of the United Kingdom was held in 1801; parliaments between 1707 and 1800 were either parliaments of Great Britain or of Ireland). For acts passed up until 1707, see the list of acts of the Parliament of England and the list of acts of the Parliament of Scotland. For acts passed from 1707 to 1800, see the list of acts of the Parliament of Great Britain. See also the list of acts of the Parliament of Ireland.

For acts of the devolved parliaments and assemblies in the United Kingdom, see the list of acts of the Scottish Parliament, the list of acts of the Northern Ireland Assembly, and the list of acts and measures of Senedd Cymru; see also the list of acts of the Parliament of Northern Ireland.

The number shown after each act's title is its chapter number. Acts passed before 1963 are cited using this number, preceded by the year(s) of the reign during which the relevant parliamentary session was held; thus the Union with Ireland Act 1800 is cited as "39 & 40 Geo. 3 c. 67", meaning the 67th act passed during the session that started in the 39th year of the reign of George III and which finished in the 40th year of that reign. Note that the modern convention is to use Arabic numerals in citations (thus "41 Geo. 3" rather than "41 Geo. III"). Acts of the last session of the Parliament of Great Britain and the first session of the Parliament of the United Kingdom are both cited as "41 Geo. 3". Acts passed from 1963 onwards are simply cited by calendar year and chapter number.

All modern acts have a short title, e.g. the Local Government Act 2003. Some earlier acts also have a short title given to them by later acts, such as by the Short Titles Act 1896.

== 9 Geo. 4 ==
The second session of the 8th Parliament of the United Kingdom, which met from 29 January 1828 until 28 July 1828.

This session was also traditionally cited as 9 G. 4.

=== Public general acts ===
Short title	Citation	Royal assent
Long title
Supply Act 1828 (repealed)	9 Geo. 4. c. 1	19 February 1828
An Act for applying a Sum of Money for the Service of the Year One thousand eight hundred and twenty-eight. (Repealed by Statute Law Revision Act 1873 (36 & 37 Vict. c. 91))
Exchequer Bills Act 1828 (repealed)	9 Geo. 4. c. 2	19 February 1828
An Act for raising the Sum of Twelve Millions by Exchequer Bills, for the Service of the Year One thousand eight hundred and twenty-eight. (Repealed by Statute Law Revision Act 1873 (36 & 37 Vict. c. 91))
Marine Mutiny Act 1828 (repealed)	9 Geo. 4. c. 3	21 March 1828
An Act for the regulating of His Majesty's Royal Marine Forces while on Shore. (Repealed by Statute Law Revision Act 1873 (36 & 37 Vict. c. 91))
Mutiny Act 1828 (repealed)	9 Geo. 4. c. 4	21 March 1828
An Act for punishing Mutiny and Desertion; and for the better Payment of the Army and their Quarters. (Repealed by Statute Law Revision Act 1873 (36 & 37 Vict. c. 91))
Duties on Personal Estates, etc. Act 1828 (repealed)	9 Geo. 4. c. 5	26 March 1828
An Act for continuing to His Majesty for One Year certain Duties on Personal Estates, Offices, and Pensions in England, for the Service of the Year One thousand eight hundred and twenty-eight. (Repealed by Statute Law Revision Act 1873 (36 & 37 Vict. c. 91))
Indemnity Act 1828 (repealed)	9 Geo. 4. c. 6	26 March 1828
An Act to indemnify such Persons in the United Kingdom as have omitted to qualify themselves for Offices and Employments, and for extending the Time limited for those Purposes respectively until the Twenty-fifth Day of March One thousand eight hundred and twenty-nine. (Repealed by Promissory Oaths Act 1871 (34 & 35 Vict. c. 48))
Lighting, etc., of Cities, etc. (Ireland) Act 1828 (repealed)	9 Geo. 4. c. 7	26 March 1828
An Act to continue for One Year, and from thence to the End of the then next Session of Parliament, so much of certain Acts of the Parliament of Ireland as relate to the lighting, cleansing, and watching of Cities and Towns, for the lighting, cleansing, and watching of which no particular Provision is made by any Act of Parliament. (Repealed by Statute Law Revision Act 1873 (36 & 37 Vict. c. 91))
Quartering of Soldiers Act 1828 (repealed)	9 Geo. 4. c. 8	3 April 1828
An Act for fixing, until the Twenty-fifth Day of March One thousand eight hundred and twenty-nine, the Rates of Subsistence to be paid to Innkeepers and others on quartering Soldiers. (Repealed by Statute Law Revision Act 1873 (36 & 37 Vict. c. 91))
Sessions of the Peace, Westminster Act 1828 (repealed)	9 Geo. 4. c. 9	3 April 1828
An Act to enable the Justices of the Peace for Westminster to hold their Sessions of the Peace during Term and the Sitting of the Court of King's Bench. (Repealed by Statute Law Revision Act 1861 (24 & 25 Vict. c. 101))
Supply (No. 2) Act 1828 (repealed)	9 Geo. 4. c. 10	3 April 1828
An Act for applying certain Sums of Money to the Service of the Year One thousand eight hundred and twenty-eight. (Repealed by Statute Law Revision Act 1873 (36 & 37 Vict. c. 91))
Use of Fire on Steamboats Act 1828 (repealed)	9 Geo. 4. c. 11	3 April 1828
An Act to exempt Vessels propelled by Steam from the Penalties to which Vessels are liable, under various Acts, for having Fire on Board in the Ports, Harbours, Rivers, Canals, and Lakes of Ireland. (Repealed by Statute Law Revision Act 1873 (36 & 37 Vict. c. 91))
Witnesses' Indemnity (Penryn) Act 1828 (repealed)	9 Geo. 4. c. 12	18 April 1828
An Act to indemnify Witnesses who may give Evidence, before the Lords Spiritual and Temporal, on a Bill to exclude the Borough of Penryn from sending Members to serve in Parliament. (Repealed by Statute Law Revision Act 1873 (36 & 37 Vict. c. 91))
Stamps on Fire Insurances Act 1828 (repealed)	9 Geo. 4. c. 13	9 May 1828
An Act for further regulating the Payment of the Duties under the Management of the Commissioners of Stamps on Insurances from Loss or Damage by Fire. (Repealed by Revenue Act 1869 (32 & 33 Vict. c. 14))
Statute of Frauds Amendment Act 1828 or Lord Tenterden's Act	9 Geo. 4. c. 14	9 May 1828
An Act for rendering a written Memorandum necessary to the Validity of certain Promises and Engagements.
Amendment of Record in Civil Actions Act 1828 (repealed)	9 Geo. 4. c. 15	9 May 1828
An Act to prevent a Failure of Justice by reason of Variances between Records and Writings produced in Evidence in support thereof. (Repealed by Statute Law Revision Act 1890 (53 & 54 Vict. c. 33))
Life Annuities Act 1828 (repealed)	9 Geo. 4. c. 16	9 May 1828
An Act to repeal so much of several Acts as empowers the Commissioners for the Reduction of the National Debt to grant Life Annuities. (Repealed by Statute Law Revision Act 1890 (53 & 54 Vict. c. 33))
Sacramental Test Act 1828 (repealed)	9 Geo. 4. c. 17	9 May 1828
An Act for repealing so much of several Acts as imposes the Necessity of receiving the Sacrament of the Lord's Supper as a Qualification for certain Offices and Employments. (Repealed by Promissory Oaths Act 1871 (34 & 35 Vict. c. 48))
Stamp Duties on Cards and Dice Act 1828 (repealed)	9 Geo. 4. c. 18	9 May 1828
An Act to repeal the Stamp Duties on Cards and Dice made in the United Kingdom, and to grant other Duties in lieu thereof; and to amend and consolidate the Acts relating to such Cards and Dice, and the Exportation thereof. (Repealed by Revenue Act 1862 (25 & 26 Vict. c. 22))
Supply (No. 3) Act 1828 (repealed)	9 Geo. 4. c. 19	9 May 1828
An Act for applying a Sum of Money out of the Consolidated Fund for the Service of the Year One thousand eight hundred and twenty-eight. (Repealed by Statute Law Revision Act 1873 (36 & 37 Vict. c. 91))
Importation of Foreign Wheat Act 1828 (repealed)	9 Geo. 4. c. 20	13 May 1828
An Act for prohibiting, during the present Session of Parliament, the Importation of Foreign Wheat into the Isle of Man; and for levying a Duty on Meal or Flour made of Foreign Wheat imported from the Isle of Man into the United Kingdom. (Repealed by Statute Law Revision Act 1873 (36 & 37 Vict. c. 91))
Passengers in Merchant Vessels Act 1828 (repealed)	9 Geo. 4. c. 21	23 May 1828
An Act to regulate the Carriage of Passengers in Merchants Vessels from the United Kingdom to the Continent and Islands of North America. (Repealed by Merchant Vessels, etc. Act 1835 (5 & 6 Will. 4. c. 53))
Controverted Elections Act 1828 (repealed)	9 Geo. 4. c. 22	23 May 1828
An Act to consolidate and amend the Laws relating to the Trial of controverted Elections or Returns of Members to serve in Parliament. (Repealed by Controverted Elections Act 1844 (7 & 8 Vict. c. 103))
Bank Notes Act 1828 (repealed)	9 Geo. 4. c. 23	19 June 1828
An Act to enable Bankers in England to issue certain unstamped Promissory Notes and Bills of Exchange, upon Payment of a Composition in lieu of the Stamp Duties thereon. (Repealed by Statute Law Revision Act 1873 (36 & 37 Vict. c. 91) and Statute Law Revision Act 1950 (14 Geo. 6. c. 6))
Bills of Exchange (Ireland) Act 1828	9 Geo. 4. c. 24	19 June 1828
An Act to repeal certain Acts, and to consolidate and amend the Laws relating to Bills of Exchange and Promissory Notes in Ireland.
Revenue Solicitors' Act 1828	9 Geo. 4. c. 25	19 June 1828
An Act to authorize the Appointment of Persons to act as Solicitors on behalf of His Majesty in any Court or Jurisdiction in Revenue Matters.
Keeper of Register of Hornings, etc. (Scotland) Act 1828 (repealed)	9 Geo. 4. c. 26	19 June 1828
An Act to regulate the Office of Keeper of the General Register of Hornings and Inhibitions in Scotland. (Repealed by Statute Law Revision Act 1890 (53 & 54 Vict. c. 33))
Receipt Stamps Act 1828 (repealed)	9 Geo. 4. c. 27	19 June 1828
An Act to repeal the Allowances made to Stationers on the Purchase of Stamps for Receipts at the Head Office in London, and to grant an Allowance to Persons purchasing such Stamps to a certain Amount of the Commissioners of Stamps or of the Distributors of Stamps in Great Britain. (Repealed by Inland Revenue Repeal Act 1870 (33 & 34 Vict. c. 99))
Pensions Act Amendment Act 1828 or the Offices Pensions Act 1828 (Note: The bill for this act was the Pensions Act Amendment Bill, previously called the Offices Pensions Bill.) or the Supply Act 1828 (repealed)	9 Geo. 4. c. 28	19 June 1828
An Act to enlarge the Powers granted to His Majesty under an Act passed in the Fifty-seventh Year of His late Majesty, to enable His Majesty to recompense the Service of Persons holding, or who have held, certain high and efficient Civil Offices.} (Repealed by Statute Law Revision Act 1873 (36 & 37 Vict. c. 91))
Circuit Courts (Scotland) Act 1828	9 Geo. 4. c. 29	19 June 1828
An Act to authorize additional Circuit Courts of Justiciary to be held, and to facilitate Criminal Trials in Scotland.
Supply (No. 4) Act 1828 (repealed)	9 Geo. 4. c. 30	19 June 1828
An Act for applying surplus Ways and Means to the Service of the Year One thousand eight hundred and twenty-eight. (Repealed by Statute Law Revision Act 1873 (36 & 37 Vict. c. 91))
Offences Against the Person Act 1828 or Lord Lansdowne's Act (repealed)	9 Geo. 4. c. 31	27 June 1828
An Act for consolidating and amending the Statutes in England relative to Offences against the Person. (Repealed by Criminal Statutes Repeal Act 1861 (24 & 25 Vict. c. 95))
Civil Rights of Convicts Act 1828 (repealed)	9 Geo. 4. c. 32	27 June 1828
An Act for amending the Law of Evidence in certain Cases. (Repealed by Statute Law (Repeals) Act 1981 (c. 19))
Administration of Estates in India Act 1828 (repealed)	9 Geo. 4. c. 33	27 June 1828
An Act to declare and settle the Law respecting the Liability of the Real Estates of British Subjects and others, situate within the Jurisdiction of His Majesty's Supreme Courts in India, as Assets in the Hands of Executors and Administrators, to the Payment of the Debts of their deceased Owners. (Repealed by Statute Law Revision Act 1873 (36 & 37 Vict. c. 91))
Madhouses (Scotland) Act 1828 (repealed)	9 Geo. 4. c. 34	27 June 1828
An Act for altering and amending an Act passed in the Fifty-fifth Year of the Reign of His late Majesty, intituled "An Act to regulate Madhouses in Scotland." (Note: Madhouses (Scotland) Act 1815 (55 Geo. 3. c. 69)) (Repealed by Lunacy (Scotland) Act 1857 (20 & 21 Vict. c. 71))
Protection of Purchasers Against Judgements (Ireland) Act 1828 (repealed)	9 Geo. 4. c. 35	27 June 1828
An Act to protect Purchasers for valuable Consideration in Ireland against Judgments not revived or re-docketed within a limited Time. (Repealed by Statute Law Revision Act 1891 (54 & 55 Vict. c. 67))
Sugar Duties Act 1828 (repealed)	9 Geo. 4. c. 36	27 June 1828
An Act for continuing to His Majesty for One Year certain Duties on Sugar imported into the United Kingdom, for the Service of the Year One thousand eight hundred and twenty-eight. (Repealed by Statute Law Revision Act 1873 (36 & 37 Vict. c. 91))
Cinque Ports Act 1828 (repealed)	9 Geo. 4. c. 37	27 June 1828
An Act to amend an Act of the First and Second Years of His present Majesty, (Note: Cinque Ports Act 1821 (1 & 2 Geo. 4. c. 76)) for preventing Depredations within the Jurisdiction of the Cinque Ports, and for the Adjustment of Salvage; and for giving further Powers to the Deputy Warden of the Cinque Ports and Lieutenant of Dovor Castle. (Repealed by Statute Law (Repeals) Act 1993 (c. 50))
Land Tax Commissioners' Act 1828 (repealed)	9 Geo. 4. c. 38	27 June 1828
An Act for rectifying Mistakes in the Names of the Land Tax Commissioners, and for appointing additional Commissioners, and indemnifying such Persons as have acted without due Authority in Execution of the Acts therein recited. (Repealed by Finance Act 1963 (c. 25))
Salmon Fisheries (Scotland) Act 1828 (repealed)	9 Geo. 4. c. 39	15 July 1828
An Act for the Preservation of the Salmon Fisheries in Scotland. (Repealed by Statute Law (Repeals) Act 1977 (c. 18))
County Lunatic Asylums (England) Act 1828 or the County Asylums Act 1828 (repealed)	9 Geo. 4. c. 40	15 July 1828
An Act to amend the Laws for the Erection and Regulation of County Lunatic Asylums. And more effectually to provide for the care and maintenance of Pauper and Criminal Lunatics in England. (Repealed by County Asylums Act 1845 (8 & 9 Vict. c. 126))
Madhouse Act 1828 or the Madhouses Act 1828 or the Lunatics (England) Act 1828 or the Metropolitan Commissioners in Lunacy Act 1828 (repealed)	9 Geo. 4. c. 41	15 July 1828
An Act to regulate the Care and Treatment of Insane Persons in England. (Repealed by Insane Persons (England) Act 1832 (2 & 3 Will. 4. c. 107))
Church Building Society Act 1828	9 Geo. 4. c. 42	15 July 1828
An Act to abolish Church Briefs, and to provide for the better Collection and Application of voluntary Contributions for the Purpose of enlarging and building Churches and Chapels.
Division of Counties Act 1828 (repealed)	9 Geo. 4. c. 43	15 July 1828
An Act for the better Regulation of Divisions in the several Counties of England and Wales. (Repealed by Justices of the Peace Act 1949 (12, 13 & 14 Geo. 6. c. 101))
Excise Act 1828 (repealed)	9 Geo. 4. c. 44	15 July 1828
An Act to provide for the Execution, throughout the United Kingdom, of the several Laws of Excise relating to Licences and Survey on Tea, Coffee, Cocoa, Pepper, Tobacco, Snuff, Foreign and Colonial Spirits and Wine, notwithstanding the Transfer to the Customs of the Import Duties on any of such Commodities. (Repealed by Customs and Excise Act 1952 (15 & 16 Geo. 6 & 1 Eliz. 2. c. 44))
Distillation of Spirits Act 1828 (repealed)	9 Geo. 4. c. 45	15 July 1828
An Act to amend and to make perpetual, and extend to the whole of the United Kingdom, certain Provisions contained in several Acts for regulating the Rectification, compounding, dealing in, or retailing of Spirits, and for preventing private Distillation, in Scotland; and to provide for the Payment of the Duty on Malt used in making of Spirits from Malt only. (Repealed by Statute Law Revision Act 1873 (36 & 37 Vict. c. 91))
Hotel Keepers Act 1828 (repealed)	9 Geo. 4. c. 46	15 July 1828
An Act to enable certain Hotel Keepers to be licensed to keep Hotels as common Inns, Alehouses, and Victualling Houses, and to sell therein Beer and other exciseable Liquors, for the Residue of the present Year. (Repealed by Statute Law Revision Act 1873 (36 & 37 Vict. c. 91))
Passage Vessel Licences Act 1828 (repealed)	9 Geo. 4. c. 47	15 July 1828
An Act for regulating the Retail of exciseable Articles and Commodities to Passengers on board of Passage Vessels from one Part to another of the United Kingdom. (Repealed by Statute Law Revision Act 1873 (36 & 37 Vict. c. 91))
Duties on Glass Act 1828 (repealed)	9 Geo. 4. c. 48	15 July 1828
An Act to repeal the Excise Duties, and Drawbacks on Plate Glass, Broad Glass, Crown Glass, Bottle Glass, and Glass Bottles, payable in Great Britain and Ireland respectively, and to impose other Duties and to grant other Drawbacks in lieu thereof, throughout the United Kingdom; and to make perpetual, and to extend to the United Kingdom, several Acts relating to certain Duties on Glass. (Repealed by Glass Duties Act 1838 (1 & 2 Vict. c. 44))
Stamp Duties Act 1828 (repealed)	9 Geo. 4. c. 49	15 July 1828
An Act to amend the Laws in force relating to the Stamp Duties on Sea Insurances, on Articles of Clerkship, on Certificates of Writers to the Signet, and of Conveyancers and others, on Licences to Dealers in Gold and Silver Plate, and Pawnbrokers, on Drafts on Bankers, and on Licences for Stage Coaches in Great Britain s and on Receipts in Ireland. (Repealed by Inland Revenue Repeal Act 1870 (33 & 34 Vict. c. 99) and Pawnbrokers Act 1872 (35 & 36 Vict. c. 93))
East India Company (Prize Money) Act 1828 (repealed)	9 Geo. 4. c. 50	15 July 1828
An Act for regulating the Appropriation of certain unclaimed Shares of Prize Money acquired by Soldiers or Seamen in the Service of the East India Company. (Repealed by Statute Law Revision Act 1873 (36 & 37 Vict. c. 91))
Canada Company Amendment Act 1828 (repealed)	9 Geo. 4. c. 51	15 July 1828
An Act to alter and amend an Act (Note: Canada Company Act 1825 (6 Geo. 4. c. 75)) for enabling His Majesty to grant to a Company, to be incorporated by Charter, to be called "The Canada Company," certain Lands in the Province of Upper Canada. (Repealed by Statute Law (Repeals) Act 1977 (c. 18))
Killiney Chapel Act 1828	9 Geo. 4. c. 52	15 July 1828
An Act for erecting a Chapel of Ease at Killiney in the Parish of Monkstown in the County and Diocese of Dublin, and for providing for the due Celebration of Divine Service therein.
Criminal Statutes (Ireland) Repeal Act 1828 (repealed)	9 Geo. 4. c. 53	15 July 1828
An Act to repeal several Acts and Parts of Acts in force in Ireland, relating to Bail in Cases of Felony, and to certain Proceedings in Criminal Cases, and to the Benefit of Clergy, and to Larceny and other Offences connected therewith, and to malicious Injuries to Property. (Repealed by Statute Law Revision Act 1873 (36 & 37 Vict. c. 91))
Criminal Law (Ireland) Act 1828 (repealed)	9 Geo. 4. c. 54	15 July 1828
An Act for improving the Administration of Justice in Criminal Cases in Ireland. (Repealed by Statute Law Revision Act 1964 (c. 79)) (Note: Repealed on 31 July 1964 (date of royal assent) by the Statute Law Revision Act 1964 (c. 79), s.1 & Sch.)
Larceny (Ireland) Act 1828 (repealed)	9 Geo. 4. c. 55	15 July 1828
An Act for consolidating and amending the Laws in Ireland relative to Larceny, and other Offences connected therewith. (Repealed by Criminal Statutes Repeal Act 1861 (24 & 25 Vict. c. 95))
Malicious Injuries to Property (Ireland) Act 1828 (repealed)	9 Geo. 4. c. 56	15 July 1828
An Act for consolidating and amending the Laws in Ireland relative to malicious Injuries to Property. (Repealed by Criminal Statutes Repeal Act 1861 (24 & 25 Vict. c. 95))
Registry of Deeds, etc. (Ireland) Act 1828 (repealed)	9 Geo. 4. c. 57	15 July 1828
An Act to provide for the Regulation of the Public Office for registering Memorials of Deeds, Conveyances, and Wills, in Ireland. (Repealed by Registry of Deeds (Ireland) Act 1832 (2 & 3 Will. 4. c. 87))
Licensing (Scotland) Act 1828 (repealed)	9 Geo. 4. c. 58	15 July 1828
An Act to regulate the granting of Certificates, by Justices of the Peace and Magistrates, authorizing Persons to keep common Inns, Alehouses, and Victualling Houses, in Scotland, in which Ale, Beer, Spirits, Wine, and other Exciseable Liquors may be sold by Retail under Excise Licences; and for the better Regulation of such Houses; and for the Prevention of such Houses being kept without such Certificate. (Repealed by Licensing (Scotland) Act 1903 (3 Edw. 7. c. 25))
Parliamentary Elections (England) Act 1828 (repealed)	9 Geo. 4. c. 59	15 July 1828
An Act to regulate the Mode of taking the Poll at the Election of Members to serve in Parliament for Cities, Boroughs, and Ports in England and Wales. (Repealed by Statute Law Revision Act 1861 (24 & 25 Vict. c. 101))
Importation of Corn Act 1828 (repealed)	9 Geo. 4. c. 60	15 July 1828
An Act to amend the Laws relating to the Importation of Corn. (Repealed by Duties on Corn Act 1842 (5 & 6 Vict. c. 14))
Alehouse Act 1828 (repealed)	9 Geo. 4. c. 61	15 July 1828
An Act to regulate the granting of Licences to Keepers of Inns, Alehouses, and Victualling Houses, in England. (Repealed by Licensing (Consolidation) Act 1910 (10 Edw. 7 & 1 Geo. 5. c. 24))
Linen and Hempen Manufacturers Act 1828	9 Geo. 4. c. 62	15 July 1828
An Act for the Regulation of the Linen and Hempen Manufactures of Ireland.
Constables (Ireland) Act 1828 (repealed)	9 Geo. 4. c. 63	15 July 1828
An Act to amend Two Acts of the Third (Note: Appointment of Constables, etc. (Ireland) Act 1822 (3 Geo. 4. c. 103)) and Fifth (Note: Constables (Ireland) Act 1824 (5 Geo. 4. c. 28)) Years of His present Majesty, for the Appointment of Constables in Ireland. (Repealed by Constabulary (Ireland) Act 1836 (6 & 7 Will. 4. c. 13))
Regent Street Act 1828	9 Geo. 4. c. 64	15 July 1828
An Act to extend the Jurisdiction of the Commissioners acting in the Execution of Two Acts (Note: Regent's Park, Regent Street, etc. Act 1824 (5 Geo. 4. c. 100)) (Note: Regent Street, etc. Act 1825 (6 Geo. 4. c. 38)) for paving and regulating the Regent's Park, together with the new Street from thence to Pall Mall; and to amend the said Acts.
Bank Notes (No. 2) Act 1828 (repealed)	9 Geo. 4. c. 65	15 July 1828
An Act to restrain the Negotiation, in England, of Promissory Notes and Bills under a limited Sum, issued in Scotland or Ireland. (Repealed by Statute Law Revision Act 1963 (c. 30))
Nautical Almanack Act 1828	9 Geo. 4. c. 66	15 July 1828
An Act for repealing the Laws now in force relating to the Discovery of the Longitude at Sea.
Militia Pay Act 1828 (repealed)	9 Geo. 4. c. 67	19 July 1828
An Act to defray the Charge of the Pay, Clothing, and contingent and other Expences of the Disembodied Militia in Great Britain and Ireland; and to grant Allowances in certain Cases to Subaltern Officers, Adjutants, Quartermasters, Surgeon, Assistant Surgeons, Surgeons Mates, and Serjeant Majors of the Militia, until the Twenty-fifth Day of March One thousand eight hundred and twenty-nine. (Repealed by Statute Law Revision Act 1873 (36 & 37 Vict. c. 91))
Retail Brewers Act 1828 (repealed)	9 Geo. 4. c. 68	19 July 1828
An Act to amend an Act of the Fifth Year of His present Majesty, (Note: Licenses to Brew and Sell Beer, etc. Act 1824 (5 Geo. 4. c. 54)) for amending the Laws of Excise relating to Retail Brewers. (Repealed by Statute Law Revision Act 1873 (36 & 37 Vict. c. 91))
Night Poaching Act 1828	9 Geo. 4. c. 69	19 July 1828
An Act for the more effectual Prevention of Persons going armed by Night for the Destruction of Game.
Regent Street, etc. Act 1828 (repealed)	9 Geo. 4. c. 70	19 July 1828
An Act to alter and enlarge the Powers of an Act passed in the Seventh Year of the Reign of His present Majesty, (Note: Regent Street, Carlton Place Act 1826 (7 Geo. 4. c. 77)) for extending to Charing Cross, the Strand, and Places adjacent, the Powers of an Act for making a more convenient Communication from Mary-le-bone Park, and for enabling the Commissioners of His Majesty's Woods, Forests, and Land Revenues to grant Leases of the Scite of Carlton Palace; and for other Purposes relating thereto. (Repealed by Statute Law Revision Act 1873 (36 & 37 Vict. c. 91))
Deputy Warden of the Cinque Ports Act 1828 (repealed)	9 Geo. 4. c. 71	19 July 1828
An Act to empower the Deputy Warden of the Cinque Ports and Lieutenant of Dovor Castle to act for the Lord Warden of the Cinque Ports and Constable of Dovor Castle during the Indisposition of the present Lord Warden. (Repealed by Statute Law Revision Act 1873 (36 & 37 Vict. c. 91))
Bombay Marine Act 1828 (repealed)	9 Geo. 4. c. 72	19 July 1828
An Act to extend the Provisions of the East India Mutiny Act to the Bombay Marine. (Repealed by Statute Law Revision Act 1861 (24 & 25 Vict. c. 101))
Insolvent Debtors (East Indies) Act 1828 (repealed)	9 Geo. 4. c. 73	19 July 1828
An Act to provide for the Relief of Insolvent Debtors in the East Indies, until the First Day of March One thousand eight hundred and thirty-three. (Repealed by Indian Insolvency Act 1848 (11 & 12 Vict. c. 21))
Criminal Law (India) Act 1828 (repealed)	9 Geo. 4. c. 74	25 July 1828
An Act for improving the Administration of Criminal Justice in the East Indies. (Repealed by Statute Law Revision Act 1964 (c. 79))
Holyhead Road Act 1828 or the Holyhead Roads Act 1828 (repealed)	9 Geo. 4. c. 75	25 July 1828
An Act for the further Improvement of the Road from London to Holyhead, and of the Road from London to Liverpool. (Repealed by Holyhead, Liverpool Roads Act 1830 (11 Geo. 4 & 1 Will. 4. c. 67), Holyhead Road Relief Act 1861 (24 & 25 Vict. c. 28) and Statute Law (Repeals) Act 2013 (c. 2))
Customs Act 1828 (repealed)	9 Geo. 4. c. 76	25 July 1828
An Act to amend the Laws relating to the Customs. (Repealed by Statute Law Revision Act 1861 (24 & 25 Vict. c. 101))
Turnpike Roads (England) Act 1828 (repealed)	9 Geo. 4. c. 77	25 July 1828
An Act to amend the Acts for regulating Turnpike Roads. (Repealed by Statute Law (Repeals) Act 1981 (c. 19))
Lunatics' Estates Act 1828 (repealed)	9 Geo. 4. c. 78	25 July 1828
An Act for extending the Acts passed in the Forty-third (Note: Estates of Lunatics Act 1803 (43 Geo. 3. c. 75)) and Fifty-ninth (Note: Common Recoveries, etc. Act 1819 (59 Geo. 3. c. 80)) Years of the Reign of His late Majesty King George the Third, for the Sale and Mortgage of Estates of Persons found Lunatics by Inquisition taken in England and Ireland so as to authorize such Sale and Mortgage for some Purposes; and for rendering Inquisitions on Commissions of Lunacy taken in England available in Ireland, and like Inquisitions taken in Ireland available in England. (Repealed by Infants' Property Act 1830 (11 Geo. 4 & 1 Will. 4. c. 65))
Superannuation, etc. Act 1828 (repealed)	9 Geo. 4. c. 79	25 July 1828
An Act to repeal an Act passed in the Third Year of His present Majesty, (Note: Dead-weight Annuity Act 1822 (3 Geo. 4. c. 51)) for apportioning the Burthen occasioned by the Military and Naval Pensions and Civil Superannuations, by vesting an equal Annuity in Trustees for the Payment thereof. (Repealed by Statute Law Revision Act 1873 (36 & 37 Vict. c. 91))
Bankers' Composition (Ireland) Act 1828	9 Geo. 4. c. 80	25 July 1828
An Act to enable Bankers in Ireland to issue certain unstamped Promissory Notes, upon Payment of a Composition in lieu of the Stamp Duties thereon.
Bank Notes (Ireland) Act 1828 (repealed)	9 Geo. 4. c. 81	25 July 1828
An Act for making Promissory Notes payable, issued by Banks, Banking Companies, or Bankers, in Ireland, at the Places where they are issued. (Repealed by Bank Notes (Ireland) Act 1920 (10 & 11 Geo. 5. c. 24))
Lighting of Towns (Ireland) Act 1828 (repealed)	9 Geo. 4. c. 82	25 July 1828
An Act to make Provision for the lighting, cleansing, and watching of Cities, Towns Corporate, and Market Towns, in Ireland, in certain Cases. (Repealed by Local Government (Ireland) Act 1898 (61 & 62 Vict. c. 37))
Australian Courts Act 1828	9 Geo. 4. c. 83	25 July 1828
An Act to provide for the Administration of Justice in New South Wales and Van Diemen's Land, and for the more effectual Government thereof, and for other Purposes relating thereto.
Slave Trade Act 1828 (repealed)	9 Geo. 4. c. 84	25 July 1828
An Act to continue an Act (Note: Slave Trade Act 1824 (5 Geo. 4. c. 113)) for amending and consolidating the Laws relating to the Abolition of the Slave Trade. (Repealed by Statute Law Revision Act 1861 (24 & 25 Vict. c. 101))
Lands Purchased for Charitable Purposes Act 1828 (repealed)	9 Geo. 4. c. 85	25 July 1828
An Act for remedying a Defect in the Titles of Lands purchased for charitable Purposes. (Repealed by Mortmain and Charitable Uses Act 1888 (51 & 52 Vict. c. 42))
Cinque Ports Pilots Act 1828 (repealed)	9 Geo. 4. c. 86	25 July 1828
An Act to amend an Act (Note: Pilotage Act 1825 (6 Geo. 4. c. 125)) for the Amendment of the Law respecting Pilots and Pilotage, and also for the better Preservation of Floating Lights, Buoys, and Beacons. (Repealed by Merchant Shipping Repeal Act 1854 (17 & 18 Vict. c. 120))
Deserted Children (Ireland) Act 1828 (repealed)	9 Geo. 4. c. 87	25 July 1828
An Act to continue until the Twenty-fifth Day of March One thousand eight hundred and Twenty-nine, and from thence to the End of the then next Session of Parliament, an Act passed in the Sixth Year of the Reign of His present Majesty, (Note: Deserted Children (Ireland) Act 1825 (6 Geo. 4. c. 102)) respecting deserted Children in Ireland. (Repealed by Statute Law Revision Act 1873 (36 & 37 Vict. c. 91))
Butter Trade (Ireland) Act 1828 (repealed)	9 Geo. 4. c. 88	25 July 1828
An Act to repeal certain Provisions in several Acts relating to the Butter Trade in Ireland. (Repealed by Statute Law Revision Act 1873 (36 & 37 Vict. c. 91))
Exchequer Bills Act 1828 (repealed)	9 Geo. 4. c. 89	25 July 1828
An Act for raising the Sum of Sixteen millions and forty-six thousand eight hundred Pounds, by Exchequer Bills, for the Service of the Year One thousand eight hundred and twenty-eight. (Repealed by Statute Law Revision Act 1873 (36 & 37 Vict. c. 91))
National Debt Reduction Act 1828 (repealed)	9 Geo. 4. c. 90	25 July 1828
An Act to amend the Acts for regulating the Reduction of the National Debt. (Repealed by Statute Law Revision Act 1873 (36 & 37 Vict. c. 91))
Advance for Welland Canal, Canada Act 1828 (repealed)	9 Geo. 4. c. 91	25 July 1828
An Act to authorize the Advance of a certain Sum out of the Consolidated Fund for the Completion of the Welland Canal Navigation in Upper Canada. (Repealed by Statute Law Revision Act 1874 (37 & 38 Vict. c. 35))
Savings Bank Act 1828 (repealed)	9 Geo. 4. c. 92	28 July 1828
An Act to consolidate and amend the Laws relating to Savings Banks. (Repealed by Post Office Savings Bank Act 1954 (2 & 3 Eliz. 2. c. 62) and Trustee Savings Banks Act 1954 (2 & 3 Eliz. 2. c. 63))
Delivery of Sugar Out of Bond Act 1828 (repealed)	9 Geo. 4. c. 93	28 July 1828
An Act to allow Sugar to be delivered out of Warehouse to be refined. (Repealed by Statute Law Revision Act 1861 (24 & 25 Vict. c. 101))
Clergy Resignation Bonds Act 1828 (repealed)	9 Geo. 4. c. 94	28 July 1828
An Act for rendering valid Bonds, Covenants, and other Assurances for the Resignation of Ecclesiastical Preferments, in certain specified Cases. (Repealed by Benefices Act 1898 (Amendment) Measure 1923 (14 & 15 Geo. 5 No. 1))
Appropriation Act 1828 (repealed)	9 Geo. 4. c. 95	28 July 1828
An Act to apply the Sums of Money therein mentioned for the Service of the Year One thousand eight hundred and twenty-eight, and to appropriate the Supplies granted in this Session of Parliament. (Repealed by Statute Law Revision Act 1873 (36 & 37 Vict. c. 91))

=== Local acts ===
Short title	Citation	Royal assent
Long title
Merton Rates Act 1828 (repealed)	9 Geo. 4. c. i	21 March 1828
An Act for better assessing and collecting the Poor and other Rates in the Parish of Saint Mary Martin otherwise Merton, in the County of Surrey. (Repealed by Statute Law (Repeals) Act 2008 (c. 12))
St. Mary Wimbledon Rates Act 1828 (repealed)	9 Geo. 4. c. ii	21 March 1828
An Act for better assessing and collecting the Poor and other Rates in the Parish of Saint Mary Wimbledon in the County of Surrey. (Repealed by Statute Law (Repeals) Act 2008 (c. 12))
Truro Roads Act 1828 (repealed)	9 Geo. 4. c. iii	21 March 1828
An Act for making, repairing, and improving certain Roads leading to and from Truro in the County of Cornwall. (Repealed by Truro Turnpike Roads Act 1848 (11 & 12 Vict. c. li))
Newcastle-under-Lyme and Leek Roads Act 1828 (repealed)	9 Geo. 4. c. iv	21 March 1828
An Act for repairing and improving the Road from Newcastle-under-Lyme to Leek, and several Branch Roads, all in the County of Stafford. (Repealed by Newcastle-under-Lyme and Leek Roads Act 1857 (20 & 21 Vict. c. lv))
Road from Hinckley to Melbourne Common (Derbyshire) Act 1828 (repealed)	9 Geo. 4. c. v	21 March 1828
An Act for repairing the Road from Hinckley to Melbourne Common, and other Roads communicating therewith, in the Counties of Leicester and Derby. (Repealed by Hinckley and Melbourne Roads Act 1859 (22 & 23 Vict. c. lxvii))
Beaconsfield and Uxbridge Road Act 1828 (repealed)	9 Geo. 4. c. vi	21 March 1828
An Act for repairing the Road from the West End of the Town of Beaconsfield, in the County of Buchingham, to within Half a Mile of the River Colne, near Uxbridge in the County of Middlesex. (Repealed by Beaconsfield and Red Hill Road Act 1852 (15 & 16 Vict. c. xcvii))
Liverpool and Manchester Railway Act 1828 (repealed)	9 Geo. 4. c. vii	26 March 1828
An Act to enable the Company of Proprietors of the Liverpool and Manchester Railway to alter the Line of the said Railway, and for amending and enlarging the Powers and Provisions of the several Acts relating thereto. (Repealed by Grand Junction Railway Act 1845 (8 & 9 Vict. c. cxcviii))
Bolton and Leigh Railway Act 1828 (repealed)	9 Geo. 4. c. viii	26 March 1828
An Act for amending and enlarging the Powers and Provisions of an Act (Note: Bolton and Leigh Railway Act 1825 (6 Geo. 4. c. xviii)) relating to the Bolton and Leigh Railway. (Repealed by Grand Junction Railway Act 1845 (8 & 9 Vict. c. cxcviii))
Cheltenham and Gloucester Road Act 1828 (repealed)	9 Geo. 4. c. ix	26 March 1828
An Act to enable the Trustees of the Road leading from the Town of Cheltenham in the County of Gloucester towards the City of Gloucester, to form a new Branch to communicate with the said Road in the Parish of Cheltenham. (Repealed by Cheltenham and Gloucester Turnpike Road Act 1851 (14 & 15 Vict. c. xii))
Whitehaven Roads Act 1828	9 Geo. 4. c. x	26 March 1828
An Act for more effectually repairing and improving the Roads leading to and from the Port, Harbour, ana Town of Whitehaven in the County of Cumberland.
Road from Bury to Little Bolton Act 1828 (repealed)	9 Geo. 4. c. xi	26 March 1828
An Act for more effectually repairing the Road from Bury to Little Bolton in the County Palatine of Lancaster. (Repealed by Bury and Bolton Turnpike Road Act 1852 (15 & 16 Vict. c. xci))
Roads from Kingsbridge to Dartmouth Act 1828 (repealed)	9 Geo. 4. c. xii	26 March 1828
An Act for more effectually making, repairing, and maintaining certain Roads from Kingsbridge to Dartmouth, Modbury, Salcombe, and other Places in the South Part of the County of Devon. (Repealed by Roads from Kingsbridge to Dartmouth Act 1834 (4 & 5 Will. 4. c. lxxiii))
Aberbrothock Two Pennies Scots Act 1828 (repealed)	9 Geo. 4. c. xiii	3 April 1828
An Act to continue several Acts for granting a Duty of Two Pennies Scots upon Ale and Beer brewed in the Town of Aberbrothock in the County of Forfar. (Repealed by Statute Law (Repeals) Act 2013 (c. 2))
Gosport Market Act 1828	9 Geo. 4. c. xiv	3 April 1828
An Act to amend an Act of the Fifty-first Year of His late Majesty, (Note: Gosport Market Act 1811 (51 Geo. 3. c. clxxii)) for erecting a new Market Place in the Town or Borough and Manor of Gosport in the County of Southampton.
Hove Chapel of Ease Act 1828	9 Geo. 4. c. xv	3 April 1828
An Act to establish a Chapel of Ease in the Parish of Hove in the County of Sussex.
Roads from Kipping's Cross, Goudhurst Gore and Underden Green Act 1828 (repealed)	9 Geo. 4. c. xvi	3 April 1828
An Act for more effectually repairing and improving the Roads from Kipping's Cross to Willey Green, and from a Place near Goudhurst Gore to Stilebridge, and from Underden Green to Wanshutts Green, all in the County of Kent. (Repealed by Horsmonden and Marden Road Act 1854 (17 & 18 Vict. c. xlviii))
Road from Wadhurst and from Pullen's Hill Act 1828 (repealed)	9 Geo. 4. c. xvii	3 April 1828
An Act for more effectually repairing and improving the Road from Wadhurst to the Turnpike Road at Lamberhurst Doom, both in the County of Sussex; and from the Turnpike Road at Pullen's Hill to West Farleigh Street, both in the County of Kent. (Repealed by Wadhurst and West Farleigh Road Act 1855 (18 & 19 Vict. c. clvi))
Wrotham Heath Roads (Kent) Act 1828	9 Geo. 4. c. xviii	3 April 1828
An Act for more effectually repairing the Road from Footscray, by Wrotham Heath, to Maidstone, and from the said Road into the Road from Mereworth to Hadlow; and for making and maintaining a Road from the said Road at Wrotham Heath to Teston, and from the said Road from Mereworth to Hadlow to Saint Leonard's Street in the Parish of West Malling; all in the County of Kent.
Roads to Join Crewkerne Turnpike Road (Dorset and Somerset) Act 1828 (repealed)	9 Geo. 4. c. xix	3 April 1828
An Act for making and maintaining a Turnpike Road from the Bridport Turnpike Road at Allington, through Broadwindsor and Drimpton in the County of Dorset, to the Crewkerne Turnpike Road at or near Clapton Bridge, and also from Hewish Toll Gate to the Crewkerne Turnpike Road at or near Roundham Corner in the Parish of Crewkerne in the County of Somerset. (Repealed by Bridport and Broadwinsor Road Act 1855 (18 & 19 Vict. c. cxii))
Road from Carlisle to Brampton Act 1828	9 Geo. 4. c. xx	3 April 1828
An Act for making and maintaining a Turnpike Road from the City of Carlisle in the County of Cumberland, by way of Warwick Bridge, to the Market Town of Brampton in the said County.
Harnham Hill, Blandford and Dorchester Road Act 1828 (repealed)	9 Geo. 4. c. xxi	3 April 1828
An Act for more effectually repairing the Roads from the Top of Harnham Hill near New Sarum, through Blandford and Dorchester, to Askerswell Hill, and from Harnham Hill aforesaid to a House called Master Baker's Farm House, in Ike Counties of Wilts and Dorset. (Repealed by Harnham Hill, Blandford and Dorchester Road Act 1835 (5 & 6 Will. 4. c. lxvi))
Bury Gas Act 1828 (repealed)	9 Geo. 4. c. xxii	18 April 1828
An Act for lighting with Gas the Town of Bury, and the Neighbourhood thereof, in the Parish of Bury, in the County Palatine of Lancaster. (Repealed by Bury Gas Act 1846 (9 & 10 Vict. c. iv))
Nottingham and Mansfield Road Act 1828	9 Geo. 4. c. xxiii	18 April 1828
An Act for more effectually repairing, widening, and otherwise improving the Road from the South End of Milton Street in the Town of Nottingham to the West End of Blind Lane in the Town of Mansfield in the County of Nottingham.
Lincoln Gas Act 1828	9 Geo. 4. c. xxiv	9 May 1828
An Act for lighting with Gas the City of Lincoln, and the Bail and Close of Lincoln, in the County of Lincoln.
Cliffe Improvement Act 1828 (repealed)	9 Geo. 4. c. xxv	9 May 1828
An Act for paving, lighting, watching, cleansing, regulating, and improving the Vill and Parish of the Cliffe, near Lewes, in the County of Sussex. (Repealed by East Sussex Act 1981 (c. xxv))
Stalybridge Improvement and Police Act 1828	9 Geo. 4. c. xxvi	9 May 1828
An Act for lighting, watching, and otherwise improving the Town of Stalybridge in the Counties Palatine of Lancaster and Chester, and for regulating the Police thereof; and for establishing and regulating a Market, and erecting a Market Place within the said Town.
Lincoln Improvement Act 1828 or the Lincoln Paving and Lighting Act 1828 (repealed)	9 Geo. 4. c. xxvii	9 May 1828
An Act for paving, lighting, watching, and improving the City of Lincoln, and the Bail and Close of Lincoln, in the County of Lincoln, and for regulating the Police therein. (Repealed by Ministry of Health Provisional Order Confirmation (Lincoln Extension) Act 1920 (10 & 11 Geo. 5. c. cxvii))
Stoke-upon-Trent Watching and Lighting Act 1828 (repealed)	9 Geo. 4. c. xxviii	9 May 1828
An Act for explaining and amending an Act passed in the Sixth Year of His present Majesty's Reign, for watching and lighting the Townships or Vills of Hanley and Shelton, in the Parish of Stoke-upon-Trent in the County of Stafford. (Repealed by Local Government Board's Provisional Order Confirmation (No. 11) Act 1905 (5 Edw. 7. c. cvii))
Canterbury and Whitstable Railway Act 1828	9 Geo. 4. c. xxix	9 May 1828
An Act to authorize the Company of Proprietors of the Canterbury and Whitstable Railway to raise a further Sum of Money for completing the Undertaking; and for enlarging and amending the Powers of the Acts passed for making and maintaining the said Railway and Works connected therewith.
Louth Navigation Act 1828	9 Geo. 4. c. xxx	9 May 1828
An Act for improving and maintaining the Navigation from the River Humber to Altringham in the County of Lincoln, and from thence to Louth in the same County.
Dover Harbour Act 1828 (repealed)	9 Geo. 4. c. xxxi	9 May 1828
An Act for more effectually maintaining and improving the Harbour of Dovor in the County of Kent. (Repealed by Dover Harbour Consolidation Act 1954 (2 & 3 Eliz. 2. c. iv))
High Bridges and Uttoxeter, and Spath and Hanging Bridge Roads Act 1828	9 Geo. 4. c. xxxii	9 May 1828
An Act for more effectually amending, widening, and keeping in repair Two several Districts of Road leading from High Bridges to Uttoxeter, and from the Newcastle Road at Snath, near Uttoxeter, to the Leek Road at or near Hanging Bridge in the County of Stafford.
Beaumaris and Menai Bridge Road Act 1828	9 Geo. 4. c. xxxiii	9 May 1828
An Act for making and maintaining a Road from the Town of Beaumaris to join the London and Holyhead Post Road at or near to the Menai Bridge, all in the County of Anglesey.
Spernal Ash and Birmingham Road Act 1828	9 Geo. 4. c. xxxiv	9 May 1828
An Act for repairing the Road from Spernal Ash in the County of Warwick, through Studley, to Birmingham.
Great Torrington Roads Act 1828 (repealed)	9 Geo. 4. c. xxxv	9 May 1828
An Act for more effectually improving and keeping in repair the Roads leading to and from the Town of Great Torrington in the County of Devon, and for making certain new Lines of Road to communicate with the same. (Repealed by Great Torrington Turnpike Roads Act 1865 (28 & 29 Vict. c. lxxx))
Roads from Cambridge to Chishill and to Royston Act 1828	9 Geo. 4. c. xxxvi	9 May 1828
An Act for more effectually repairing the Roads from the Town of Cambridge to the Wadesmill Turnpike Road, in the Parishes of Great Chishill and Little Chishill, in the County of Essex, and from the said Town of Cambridge to Royston in the County of Cambridge.
North Shields Improvement Act 1828 (repealed)	9 Geo. 4. c. xxxvii	13 May 1828
An Act for paving, lighting, watching, cleansing, regulating, and improving the Town of North Shields in the County of Northumberland. (Repealed by Tyne and Wear Act 1980 (c. xliii))
Hertford Improvement Act 1828	9 Geo. 4. c. xxxviii	13 May 1828
An Act to amend and extend the Provisions of an Act (Note: Hertford Improvement Act 1788 (28 Geo. 3. c. 75)) for paving and improving the Streets and other public Passages and Places within the Borough of Hertford.
Bideford Harbour Act 1828	9 Geo. 4. c. xxxix	13 May 1828
An Act for regulating and fixing the Rates to be paid for Goods imported at and exported from the Quay of Bideford, in the County of Devon, and for Keyage and Keelage of Ships and Vessels in the Harbour of Bideford, and for more easily levying and collecting the same; and also for regulating Ships and Vessels in the said Harbour.
March Drainage Act 1828	9 Geo. 4. c. xl	13 May 1828
An Act for amending Three Acts of the Thirtieth Year of King George the Second, (Note: March, Cambridge, Isle of Ely Drainage Act 1757 (30 Geo. 2. c. 36)) and the Thirty-second (Note: Isle of Ely Drainage Act 1792 (32 Geo. 3. c. 108)) and Thirty-fifth (Note: Isle of Ely Drainage Act 1795 (35 Geo. 3. c. 48)) Years of His late Majesty King George the Third, so far as relates to the draining and preserving certain Fen Lands and Low Grounds within the Township or Hamlet of March, in the Isle of Ely and County of Cambridge, called the Fourth District.
Bristol Markets Act 1828	9 Geo. 4. c. xli	13 May 1828
An Act for removing the present Cattle Market now held in Saint Thomas Street in the City of Bristol, for providing a better and more convenient Market instead thereof, and for rebuilding and enlarging the Wool Hall in Saint Thomas Street.
Ashton-under-Lyne Improvement Act 1828 (repealed)	9 Geo. 4. c. xlii	13 May 1828
An Act for altering and amending an Act passed in the last Session of Parliament, intituled "An Act for lighting, cleansing, watching, and otherwise improving the Town of Ashton-under-Lyne, tn the County Palatine of Lancaster, and for regulating the Police thereof;" (Note: Ashton-under-Lyne Improvement Act 1827 (7 & 8 Geo. 4. c. lxxvii)) and also for regulating the Market, and erecting a Market Place within and for the said Town. (Repealed by Ashton-under-Lyne Improvement Act 1849 (12 & 13 Vict. c. xxxv))
East Greenwich Poor Relief and Improvement Act 1828 (repealed)	9 Geo. 4. c. xliii	13 May 1828
An Act for repealing an Act of the Twenty-sixth Year of the Reign of King George the Second, (Note: East Greenwich Poor Relief, etc. Act 1753 (26 Geo. 2. c. 100)) for the better Relief and Employment of the Poor in the Parish of East Greenwich in the County of Kent, and for repairing the Highways and cleansing the Streets thereof; and for making more effectual Provisions in lieu of the said Act. (Repealed by London Government (Borough of Greenwich) Order in Council 1901 (SR&O 1901/267))
Mildenhall and Littleport Road over River Ouse Act 1828 (repealed)	9 Geo. 4. c. xliv	13 May 1828
An Act for making and maintaining a Road from Beck Fen Lane, in the Parish of Mildenhall in the County of Suffolk, to the South-east End of the Bridge over the River Ouze in the Parish of Littleport in the Isle of Ely and County of Cambridge, and other Roads therein mentioned, in the Counties of Norfolk and Suffolk. (Repealed by Mildenhall and Lakenheath Turnpike Roads Act 1851 (14 & 15 Vict. c. xviii))
Road from Ipswich to Southtown and to Bungay Act 1828 (repealed)	9 Geo. 4. c. xlv	13 May 1828
An Act for repairing the Road leading from Ipswich to South Town, and from the said Road, at or near Beech Lane in the Parish of Darsham, to Bungay in the County of Suffolk. (Repealed by Statute Law (Repeals) Act 2008 (c. 12))
Balby and Worksop Turnpike Road Act 1828 (repealed)	9 Geo. 4. c. xlvi	13 May 1828
An Act for amending and maintaining the Turnpike Road from the Northern End of the Village of Balby in the County of York, to Worksop in the County of Nottingham. (Repealed by Balby and Worksop Road Act 1858 (21 & 22 Vict. c. lxxi))
Hursley and Chilton Pond Turnpike Road Act 1828 (repealed)	9 Geo. 4. c. xlvii	13 May 1828
An Act for repairing the Road from the present Turnpike Road in the Parish of Hursley in the County of Southampton, to Andover, and from thence to Newbury, and from Newbury to Chilton Pond, in the County of Berks. (Repealed by Andover and East Ilsley Road Act 1864 (27 & 28 Vict. c. xliii))
Upottery and Ilminster Roads Act 1828 (repealed)	9 Geo. 4. c. xlviii	13 May 1828
An Act for more effectually repairing the Road from the Honiton Turnpike Road near Yard Farm in the Parish of Upottery in the County of Devon, towards Ilminster, to the Eastern Boundary of the Parish of Buckland Saint Mary in the County of Somerset, and other Roads communicating therewith. (Repealed by Upottery and Ilminster Roads Act 1840 (3 & 4 Vict. c. xxxvii))
Gosport and Bishop's Waltham, and Wickham and Chawton Road Act 1828 or the Roads from Gosport Act 1828	9 Geo. 4. c. xlix	13 May 1828
An Act for more effectually repairing, widening, and improving the Roads from Gosport, through Fareham and Wickham to Bishop's Waltham, and from Wickham aforesaid to Chawton Pond in the Parish of Chawton, all in the County of Southampton.
Ilminster Roads Act 1828 (repealed)	9 Geo. 4. c. l	13 May 1828
An Act for making, amending, widening, and keeping in repair certain Roads passing through or near the Town of Ilminster in the County of Somerset. (Repealed by Ilminster Roads Act 1841 (4 & 5 Vict. c. xix))
Thetford and Newmarket Road Act 1828 (repealed)	9 Geo. 4. c. li	13 May 1828
An Act for more effectually repairing the Road from Christopher's Bridge in the Borough of Thetford in the County of Suffolk, to the North-east End of the Town of Newmarket in the County of Cambridge. (Repealed by Statute Law (Repeals) Act 2008 (c. 12))
Hammersmith Bridge Act 1828 (repealed)	9 Geo. 4. c. lii	23 May 1828
An Act for altering and amending an Act passed in the Fifth Year of His present Majesty, (Note: Hammersmith Bridge Act 1824 (5 Geo. 4. c.cxii)) for building a Bridge over the River Thames at Hammersmith, and for making convenient Roads to communicate therewith. (Repealed by Local Law (Greater London Council and Inner London Boroughs) Order 1965 (SI 1965/540))
Youghal Bridge Act 1828	9 Geo. 4. c. liii	23 May 1828
An Act for the Erection of a Bridge across the River Blackwater, at or near Foxhole and the Town of Youghal in the County of Cork, to the opposite Side in the County of Waterford, and for making the necessary Approaches thereto.
Birmingham Improvement Act 1828 (repealed)	9 Geo. 4. c. liv	23 May 1828
An Act for better paving, lighting, watching, cleansing, and otherwise improving the Town of Birmingham in the County of Warwick, and for regulating the Police and Markets of the said Town. (Repealed by Birmingham Improvement Act 1851 (14 & 15 Vict. c. xciii))
Liverpool Docks Act 1828 (repealed)	9 Geo. 4. c. lv	23 May 1828
An Act to enable the Trustees of the Liverpool Docks to raise a further Sum of Money. (Repealed by Mersey Dock Acts Consolidation Act 1858 (21 & 22 Vict. c. xcii))
Gravesend Town Quay Act 1828	9 Geo. 4. c. lvi	23 May 1828
An Act for rebuilding, or for improving, regulating, and maintaining, the Town Quay of Gravesend in the County of Kent, and the Landing Place belonging thereto.
Portsmouth and Arundel Navigation Act 1828	9 Geo. 4. c. lvii	23 May 1828
An Act for granting further Powers to the Company of Proprietors of the Portsmouth and Arundel Navigation.
Kirkwall Harbour Act 1828	9 Geo. 4. c. lviii	23 May 1828
An Act for maintaining, enlarging, improving, and regulating the Harbour of the Burgh of Kirkwall in Orkney.
Helmsdale Harbour Act 1828	9 Geo. 4. c. lix	23 May 1828
An Act to repair and maintain the Harbour of Helmsdale, and Works connected therewith, in the Parish of Loth and County of Sutherland.
Stockton and Darlington Railway Act 1828 (repealed)	9 Geo. 4. c. lx	23 May 1828
An Act to enable the Company of Proprietors of the Stockton and Darlington Railway to make a Branch therefrom in the Counties of Durham and York, and to amend and enlarge the Powers and Provisions of the several Acts relating thereto. (Repealed by Stockton and Darlington Railway (Consolidation of Acts, Increase of Capital and Purchase of Middlesbrough Dock) Act 1849 (12 & 13 Vict. c. liv))
Clarence Railway Act 1828	9 Geo. 4. c. lxi	23 May 1828
An Act for making and maintaining a Railway from the River Tees, near Haverton Hill in the Parish of Billingham, to a Place called Sim Pasture Farm in the Parish of Heighington, all in the County of Durham, with certain Branches therefrom.
Nantlle Railway Act 1828	9 Geo. 4. c. lxii	23 May 1828
An Act for extending the Time for completing the Nantlle Railway and other Works connected therewith, in the County of Carnarvon.
Thames Tunnel Company Act 1828 (repealed)	9 Geo. 4. c. lxiii	23 May 1828
An Act for enabling the Thames Tunnel Company to raise a further Sum of Money, and for amending the Act (Note: Thames Tunnel Act 1824 (5 Geo. 4. c. clvi)) relating to the said Tunnel. (Repealed by Thames Tunnel Act 1866 (29 & 30 Vict. c. xx))
Swansea Markets Act 1828 (repealed)	9 Geo. 4. c. lxiv	23 May 1828
An Act for establishing Markets at Swansea in the County of Glamorgan. (Repealed by Swansea Municipal Corporation Act 1863 (26 & 27 Vict. c. xiii))
Surrey Coal Trade Act 1828 (repealed)	9 Geo. 4. c. lxv	23 May 1828
An Act to enable His Majesty's Justices of the Peace for the County of Surrey to nominate and appoint Two or more Persons to act as Principal Land Coal Meters within and for the several Parishes and Places therein mentioned in the said County. (Repealed by Surrey Act 1985 (c. iii))
City of Dublin Steam Packet Company Act 1828 (repealed)	9 Geo. 4. c. lxvi	23 May 1828
An Act for regulating and enabling the City of Dublin Steam Packet Company to sue and be sued, and thereby to encourage the Use of Vessels propelled by Steam in the Trade of Ireland. (Repealed by City of Dublin Steam Packet Company Act 1833 (3 & 4 Will. 4. c. cxv))
Road from Hunslet to Leeds Act 1828 (repealed)	9 Geo. 4. c. lxvii	23 May 1828
An Act for making a Turnpike Road from the Township of Hunslet, across the River Aire, to the Township of Leeds, together with a Branch therefrom, all in the West Riding of the County of York. (Repealed by Hunslet and Leeds Turnpike Road Act 1859 (22 & 23 Vict. c. lxxxvi))
Road from Great Grimsby Haven to Irby Act 1828	9 Geo. 4. c. lxviii	23 May 1828
An Act for more effectually repairing the Road from Great Grimsby Haven to Wold Newton Church, and from Nuns Farm to the Mill Field, in the Parish Irby, in the County of Lincoln.
Wakefield and Halifax Road Act 1828 (repealed)	9 Geo. 4. c. lxix	23 May 1828
An Act for repairing and improving the Road from Wakefield to Halifax, with certain Branches therefrom, all in the West Riding of the County of York. (Repealed by Wakefield and Halifax Roads Act 1838 (1 & 2 Vict. c. xliii))
Horsham and Steyning and Beeding Road Act 1828 (repealed)	9 Geo. 4. c. lxx	23 May 1828
An Act for repairing the Roads from Horsham to Steyning, and from thence to the top of Steyning Hill, in the County of Sussex, and from the Bottom of Steyning Hill to Slaughter's Corner in the Parish of Beeding, and from thence to Shoreham Britain the Parish of Old Shoreham, in the said County. (Repealed by Horsham and Steyning and Beeding Road Act 1860 (23 & 24 Vict. c. lxxx))
Chester and Ashton Lane End Road Act 1828	9 Geo. 4. c. lxxi	23 May 1828
An Act for more effectually repairing and maintaining the Road from the City of Chester to the Town of Frodsham in the County of Chester, and from the said Town of Frodsham to Ashton Lane End in the same County.
Newcastle-upon-Tyne and Carlisle Road (Northumberland District) Act 1828 (repealed)	9 Geo. 4. c. lxxii	23 May 1828
An Act for more effectually repairing so much of the Road from the Town of Newcastle-upon-Tyne to the City of Carlisle, as is within the County of Northumberland. (Repealed by Newcastle-upon-Tyne and Carlisle Road (within Northumberland) Act 1863 (26 & 27 Vict. c. cxxv))
Chatteris Ferry and Downham Bridge Road Act 1828	9 Geo. 4. c. lxxiii	23 May 1828
An Act for repairing the Road leading from Chatteris Ferry, through Chatteris and March, to Wisbech Saint Peter's, and from thence to Tid Gate in the Isle of Ely, and from Wisbech aforesaid, through Outwell, to Downham Bridge in the County of Norfolk.
Road from Chester to Northop Act 1828	9 Geo. 4. c. lxxiv	23 May 1828
An Act to alter, amend, and enlarge the Powers and Provisions of several Acts relating to the Road from Chester to Northop in the County of Flint.
Scole Bridge and Bury St. Edmunds Road Act 1828 (repealed)	9 Geo. 4. c. lxxv	23 May 1828
An Act for repairing the Road from Scole Bridge to Bury Saint Edmunds in the County of Suffolk. (Repealed by Statute Law (Repeals) Act 2008 (c. 12))
Main Trust Roads (Carmarthen) Act 1828 (repealed)	9 Geo. 4. c. lxxvi	23 May 1828
An Act for more effectually repairing and otherwise improving several Roads called The Main Trust Roads, all in the County of Carmarthen. (Repealed by Main Trust Roads (Carmarthenshire) Act 1833 (3 & 4 Will. 4. c. xlv))
Road from Chester to Wrexham Act 1828	9 Geo. 4. c. lxxvii	23 May 1828
An Act to alter, amend, and enlarge the Powers and Provisions of several Acts relating to the Road from Chester to Wrexham, in the City and County of Chester and the Counties of Flint and Denbigh.
Beverley and Kexby Bridge Road (Yorkshire) Act 1828	9 Geo. 4. c. lxxviii	23 May 1828
An Act for more effectually repairing and otherwise improving the Road from Beverley to Kesby Bridge in the County of York.
Road from Derby to Hurdloe House and Compton Branch Act 1828	9 Geo. 4. c. lxxix	23 May 1828
An Act for diverting, widening, repairing, and improving the Road from the Town of Derby to the South End of Compton Street next Ashborne, and from Ashborne to Hurdloe House, in the County of Derby, and that Part of the said Road called The Old Road, leading from Hardy's Hill Toll Gate unto Compton.
Lisburn and Monaghan Road Act 1828	9 Geo. 4. c. lxxx	23 May 1828
An Act for more effectually repairing and improving the Road leading from Lisburn in the County of Antrim to the Town of Monaghan.
Roads in Carmarthen Act 1828 (repealed)	9 Geo. 4. c. lxxxi	23 May 1828
An Act for making, repairing, and keeping in repair several Turnpike Roads in the Parishes of Llandilofawr, Llandefeyson, Llandybie, Bettws, and Llanedy, and several other Roads in the County of Carmarthen. (Repealed by Turnpike Trusts in South Wales Act 1844 (7 & 8 Vict. c. 91))
Dumbarton Roads and Bridges Act 1828	9 Geo. 4. c. lxxxii	23 May 1828
An Act for more effectually making, amending, widening, repairing, and maintaining certain Roads and Bridges in the County of Dumbarton.
Birstal and Huddersfield Roads Act 1828	9 Geo. 4. c. lxxxiii	23 May 1828
An Act for amending, diverting, and improving the present Roads, and making and maintaining certain new Roads, between the Towns of Birstal and Huddersfield in the West Riding of the County of York.
Minehead District of Roads Act 1828	9 Geo. 4. c. lxxxiv	23 May 1828
An Act for more effectually repairing the Dunster, Stowey, Watchet, and Crowcombe Districts of the Minehead Roads, in the Counties of Somerset and Devon; and for making and repairing several other Roads communicating with the same Districts of Road, or some of them.
Sandwich and Ramsgate Road and Sandwich Bridge Act 1828	9 Geo. 4. c. lxxxv	23 May 1828
An Act for more effectually repairing the Road from the Town and Port of Sandwich in the County of Kent, to the Towns of Margate and Ramsgate in the Isle of Thanet in the said County; and for reducing for a limited Time the Tolls and Duties payable at Sandwich Bridge.
Banbury and Lutterworth Road Act 1828 (repealed)	9 Geo. 4. c. lxxxvi	23 May 1828
An Act for more effectually repairing and maintaining the Road from Banbury in the County of Oxford, through Daventry and Cottesbach, to Lutterworth in the County of Leicester. (Repealed by Banbury and Lutterworth Road Act 1840 (3 & 4 Vict. c. xxxviii))
Wilsontown Road (Lanarkshire) Act 1828	9 Geo. 4. c. lxxxvii	23 May 1828
An Act for making and maintaining a Road from Wilsontown Iron Works to the Road leading from Edinburgh to Ayr, by West Calder and Allanton in the County of Lanark.
Churchover, Brownsover, Newbold-upon-Avon, Rugby and Bilton Road Act 1828 (repealed)	9 Geo. 4. c. lxxxviii	23 May 1828
An Act for more effectually repairing and maintaining the Roads from Lutterworth Hand on the Wading Street Road, through Churchover, Brownsover, Newbold-upon-Avon, Rugby, and Bilton, in the County of Warwick, to the Turnpike Road between Dunchurch and Hillmorton in the said County. (Repealed by Rugby and Lutterworth Turnpike Road Act 1838 (1 & 2 Vict. c. lxxv))
Great and Little Waldersley Drainage Act 1828	9 Geo. 4. c. lxxxix	23 May 1828
An Act for more effectually draining and improving the Lands and Grounds lying in Great and Little Waldersey in the Parishes of Wisbech Saint Peters and Elm in the Isle of Ely.
Wantage Improvement Act 1828 (repealed)	9 Geo. 4. c. xc	19 June 1828
An Act for lighting, watching, cleansing, paving, and otherwise improving the Town of mintage in the County of Berks. (Repealed by Oxfordshire Act 1985 (c. xxxiv))
Llanelly Railway and Dock Act 1828	9 Geo. 4. c. xci	19 June 1828
An Act for making and maintaining a Railway or Tram Road from Gelly Gille Farm, in the Parish of Llanelly in the County of Carmarthen, to Machynis Pool in the same Parish and County; and for making and maintaining a Wet Dock at the Termination of the said Railway or Tram Road at Machynis Pool aforesaid.
Bridgend Railway Act 1828	9 Geo. 4. c. xcii	19 June 1828
An Act for making and maintaining a Railway or Tram Road from the Dyffryn Llynvi and Pwll Cawl otherwise Porth Cawl Railway, to commence at a certain Point therein in the Parish of Laleston in the County of Glamorgan, and to terminate near to the Town of Bridgend in the same County.
Bristol and Gloucester Railway Act 1828	9 Geo. 4. c. xciii	19 June 1828
An Act for making and maintaining a Railway or Tram Road from or near the City of Bristol to Coalpit Heath in the Parish of Westerleigh in the County of Gloucester.
Avon and Gloucestershire Railway Act 1828	9 Geo. 4. c. xciv	19 June 1828
An Act for making and maintaining a Railway or Tram Road from Rodwall Hill, in the Parish of Mangotsfield in the County of Gloucester, to the River Avon in the Parish of Bitton in the same County.
East India Dock Act 1828 (repealed)	9 Geo. 4. c. xcv	19 June 1828
An Act to consolidate and amend several Acts for the further Improvement of the Port of London, by making Docks and other Works at Blackwall for the Accommodation of East India Shipping. (Repealed by Port of London (Consolidation) Act 1920 (10 & 11 Geo. 5. c. clxxiii))
Ulster Canal Act 1828	9 Geo. 4. c. xcvi	19 June 1828
An Act to amend an Act (Note: Ulster Canal Act 1825 (6 Geo. 4. c. cxciii)) for making and maintaining a Navigable Canal from Lough Erne, in the County of Fermanagh, to the River Blackwater near the Village of Charlemont in the County of Armagh.
Tees Navigation Act 1828	9 Geo. 4. c. xcvii	19 June 1828
An Act to enable the Tees Navigation Company to make a Navigable Cut from the East Side of the River Tees, near Portrack in the County of Durham, into the said River near Newport in the Township and Parish of Acklam, in the North Riding of the County of York.
Aire and Calder Navigation Act 1828	9 Geo. 4. c. xcviii	19 June 1828
An Act to enable the Undertakers of the Navigation of the Rivers Ayre and Calder, in the West Riding of the County of York, to make certain Cuts and Canals, and to improve the said Navigation.
Oldham Church Act 1828	9 Geo. 4. c. xcix	19 June 1828
An Act for amending an Act (Note: Oldham Church, Burial Ground and Church Rates Act 1824 (5 Geo. 4. c. lxiv)) for rebuilding the Church of Oldham in the County Palatine of Lancaster, and for taking down and rebuilding the Chancel and Private Chapels attached to the same.
Staines Bridge Act 1828	9 Geo. 4. c. c	19 June 1828
An Act for building a Bridge over the River Thames at Staines in the County of Middlesex, and for making proper Approaches thereto.
Wells next the Sea and Fakenham Turnpike Road Act 1828 (repealed)	9 Geo. 4. c. ci	19 June 1828
An Act to alter, amend, and enlarge the Powers and Provisions of an Act for making a Turnpike Road from Wells next the Sea to Fakenham in the County of Norfolk, and other Roads connected therewith. (Repealed by Statute Law (Repeals) Act 2008 (c. 12))
Roads, Bridges and Statute Labour in Ross and Cromarty Act 1828 (repealed)	9 Geo. 4. c. cii	19 June 1828
An Act to amend certain Acts for making and maintaining Roads and converting the Statute Labour in the Counties of Ross and Cromarty, and Part of Nairn locally situated in the County of Ross. (Repealed by Ross and Cromartyshire District Roads Act 1847 (10 & 11 Vict. c. lxix))
North End and Hammersmith Bridge Turnpike Road Act 1828	9 Geo. 4. c. ciii	19 June 1828
An Act for making and maintaining a Turnpike Road from North End to Hammersmith Bridge, both in the County of Middlesex.
Roxburgh and Berwick Roads Act 1828	9 Geo. 4. c. civ	19 June 1828
An Act for more effectually making, amending, widening, repairing, and maintaining certain Roads in the Counties of Roxburgh and Berwick.
Road from Northwich to Kelsall Hill (Cheshire) Act 1828	9 Geo. 4. c. cv	19 June 1828
An Act for more effectually amending and improving the Road from Northwich to the Guide Post heretofore upon Delamere Forest (now the Parish of Delamere), near Kellsall Hill in the County Palatine of Chester.
Roads from Tavernspite Act 1828 (repealed)	9 Geo. 4. c. cvi	19 June 1828
An Act for repairing the Roads from Tavernspite to the Towns of Pembroke and Tenby, and to Hubberston Hakin, and from Loveston Mountain to Canaston Bridge, and from the End of Toch Lane, on the said Road from Tavernspite to Hubberston Hakin, to the Road from Loveston Mountain to Canaston Bridge, and from the Parish of Crunwear to Pembroke Dock and Hobbs Point, all in the County of Pembroke. (Repealed by South Wales Turnpike Roads Act 1847 (10 & 11 Vict. c. 72))
Lymington Roads Act 1828	9 Geo. 4. c. cvii	19 June 1828
An Act far more effectually repairing and maintaining several Roads leading from Lymington in the County of Southampton, and the Road to Wilverley Post in the New Forest.
Roads from Watts Cross and from Sevenoaks Common Act 1828	9 Geo. 4. c. cviii	19 June 1828
An Act for repairing, improving, and maintaining in repair the Turnpike Roads from Wat's Cross to Cowden, and from Sevenoaks Common to Crockhurst Hatch Corner, and from Penshurst Town to Southborough, in the County of Kent.
Selkirk Roads Act 1828 (repealed)	9 Geo. 4. c. cix	19 June 1828
An Act for more effectually repairing several Roads leading through the County of Selkirk, and for better making and repairing the said Roads, and other Roads in the said County, and in the Vicinity thereof. (Repealed by Selkirkshire Roads Act 1867 (30 & 31 Vict. c. xlvii))
Road from Godstone to Highgate (Sussex) Act 1828 (repealed)	9 Geo. 4. c. cx	19 June 1828
An Act for more effectually repairing the Road from Godstone, in the County of Surrey, to Highgate in the Parish of East Grinstead in the County of Sussex. (Repealed by Godstone and Highgate Turnpike Trust Liquidation of Debt Act 1850 (13 & 14 Vict. c. lxxxiv))
Southwark Bridge Approaches Act 1828	9 Geo. 4. c. cxi	19 June 1828
An Act to authorize the Relinquishment of the Care and Management of a Road set out by the Southwark Bridge Company to the Trustees of the Surrey and Sussex Roads.
Commercial and East India and Barking Roads Act 1828 or the Commercial Roads Act 1828	9 Geo. 4. c. cxii	19 June 1828
An Act for more effectually repairing and improving the several Roads called the Cannon Street Roads, the Commercial Road, the Horseferry Branch of Road, the East India Dock Road, the Barking Road, and the Shadwell and Mile End Branch of Road, in the Counties of Middlesex and Essex; and for laying down a Stoneway on the said Commercial, East India Dock, and Barking Roads.
Covent Garden Market Act 1828 or the Covent Garden Improvement Act 1828 (repealed)	9 Geo. 4. c. cxiii	27 June 1828
An Act for the Improvement and Regulation of Covent Garden Market. (Repealed by Covent Garden Market Act 1961 (9 & 10 Eliz. 2. c. 49))
Liverpool Docks (No. 2) Act 1828 (repealed)	9 Geo. 4. c. cxiv	27 June 1828
An Act to explain and amend Two Acts, of the Fifty-first Year of His late Majesty, (Note: Liverpool Port and Town Improvement Act 1811 (51 Geo. 3. c. cxliii)) and the Sixth Year of His present Majesty, (Note: Liverpool Improvement Act 1825 (6 Geo. 4. c. clxxxvii)) for the Improvement of the Port, Harbour, and Town of Liverpool; and to authorize the Trustees of the Liverpool Docks to pay for certain Lands and Hereditaments purchased under the said Acts. (Repealed by Mersey Dock Acts Consolidation Act 1858 (21 & 22 Vict. c. xcii))
Bideford Roads Act 1828 (repealed)	9 Geo. 4. c. cxv	27 June 1828
An Act for more effectually improving and keeping in repair the several Roads leading to and from the Town of Bideford in the County of Devon, and for making certain new Lines of Road to communicate with the same. (Repealed by Bideford Roads Act 1854 (17 & 18 Vict. c. ciii))
London Docks Act 1828 (repealed)	9 Geo. 4. c. cxvi	15 July 1828
An Act to consolidate and amend the several Acts for making the London Docks. (Repealed by London and Saint Katharine Docks Act 1864 (27 & 28 Vict. c. clxxviii))
Manchester and Salford Improvement Act 1828	9 Geo. 4. c. cxvii	15 July 1828
An Act to amend several Acts for cleansing, lighting, watching, improving, and regulating the Towns of Manchester and Salford in the County Palatine of Lancaster.
Tralee Harbour Act 1828	9 Geo. 4. c. cxviii	15 July 1828
An Act for making and maintaining a Navigable Cut or Canal from a Point at or near the Blackrock in the Harbour of Tralee, in the County of Kerry, to Croompanrikard, near the Town of Tralee, in the said County; and for otherwise improving the said Harbour of Tralee.
Pembroke Water Act 1828	9 Geo. 4. c. cxix	15 July 1828
An Act for supplying with Water the Town of Pembroke, and the Neighbourhood thereof, within the County of Pembroke.
Southwark and Highgate (Sussex) Road Act 1828 (repealed)	9 Geo. 4. c. cxx	15 July 1828
An Act for more effectually amending the Road leading from the Stones End in Blackman Street, in the Borough of Southwark, in the County of Surrey, to Highgate in the County of Sussex, and several other Roads therein mentioned; and for other Purposes relating thereto. (Repealed by Surrey and Sussex Roads Act 1850 (13 & 14 Vict. c. lxxxv))
Roads from Belfast to Antrim and to Copeland Water Act 1828 (repealed)	9 Geo. 4. c. cxxi	15 July 1828
An Act for repairing and maintaining a Turnpike Road from Belfast to Antrim, and from Belfast to the Copeland Water. (Repealed by Turnpike Trusts Abolition (Ireland) Act 1857 (20 & 21 Vict. c. 16))
Minehead District of Roads (No. 2) Act 1828	9 Geo. 4. c. cxxii	25 July 1828
An Act to rectify a Mistake in an Act of this Session of Parliament, intituled "An Act for more effectually repairing the Dunster, Stowey, Watchet, and Crowcombe Districts of the Minehead Roads, in the Counties of Somerset and Devon, and for making and repairing several other Roads communicating with the same Districts of Road, or some of them." (Note: Minehead District of Roads Act 1828 (9 Geo. 4. c. lxxxiv))

=== Private acts ===
Short title	Citation	Royal assent
Long title
Enabling Francis Browne to convey a messuage, lands and hereditaments at Forston (Dorset) for the purposes of a county lunatic asylum.	9 Geo. 4. c. 1 Pr.	21 March 1828
An Act for enabling Francis John Browne of Frampton, in the County of Dorset, Esquire, to grant and convey a certain capital Messuage or Mansion House, Lands, and Hereditaments, situate at Forston in the Parish of Charminster, in the County of Dorset, for the Purposes of a Lunatic Asylum for the County of Dorset.
Tittensor and Darlaston Inclosure Act 1828	9 Geo. 4. c. 2 Pr.	21 March 1828
An Act for inclosing Lands in the Townships of Tittensor and Darlaston, in the Parish of Stone in the County of Stafford.
Hessay Inclosure Act 1828	9 Geo. 4. c. 3 Pr.	26 March 1828
An Act for inclosing, dividing, and allotting, and for exonerating from Tithes, Lands within the Township or Territories of Hessay, in the Parish of Moor Monkton in the County of the City of York.
Litlington Inclosure Act 1828	9 Geo. 4. c. 4 Pr.	3 April 1828
An Act for inclosing Lands in the Parish of Litlington in the County of Cambridge.
Broughton Inclosure Act 1828	9 Geo. 4. c. 5 Pr.	18 April 1828
An Act for inclosing Lands within the Manor and Township of Broughton in the Parish of Kirkby Ireleth, in the County Palatine of Lancaster.
Keymer Inclosure Act 1828	9 Geo. 4. c. 6 Pr.	18 April 1828
An Act for inclosing Lands in the Manor and Parish of Keymer in the County of Sussex.
Earl of Rosebery's and William Moncrieff's estates: exchanging the estates of Kirkton and Whitelaw (West Lothian) for the estate of New Halls, and investing the surplus price of New Halls in other estates to be entailed.	9 Geo. 4. c. 7 Pr.	9 May 1828
An Act for exchanging the entailed Lands and Estate of Kirkton and Whitelaw, belonging to Archibald John Earl of Rosebery, situated in the County of Linlithgow, for the entailed Lands and Estate of Newhalls, belonging to William Scott Moncrief Esquire, situated in the same County; and for investing the surplus Price of Newhalls in the Purchase of other Lands to be entailed.
Belaugh, Scottow, Little Hautbois and Hoveton St. Peter (Norfolk) Inclosure Act 1828	9 Geo. 4. c. 8 Pr.	9 May 1828
An Act for inclosing Lands in the Parishes of Belaugh, Scottow, Little Hautbois, and Hoveton Saint Peter, in the County of Norfolk.
Carton Inclosure Act 1828	9 Geo. 4. c. 9 Pr.	9 May 1828
An Act for dividing and allotting Lands in the Manor of Carton within the Parish of Boyton, in the County of Wilts.
Holme Inclosure Act 1828	9 Geo. 4. c. 10 Pr.	9 May 1828
An Act for inclosing Lands within the Graveship of Holme in the several Parishes of Kirkburton and Almondbury in the West Riding of the County of York.
Ollerset and Phoside (Derbyshire) Inclosure Act 1828	9 Geo. 4. c. 11 Pr.	9 May 1828
An Act for dividing, allotting, and inclosing the Commons or Waste Lands in the Hamlets of Ollerset and Phoside, in the Parish of Glossop in the County of Derby.
Scriven and Scotton (Yorkshire) inclosure and allotments of commons and Scotton tithes exoneration.	9 Geo. 4. c. 12 Pr.	9 May 1828
An Act for dividing, allotting, and inclosing the several Moors or Commons called Scriven Moor and Scotton Moor, in the Townships of Scriven with Tentergate and Scotton, and the Open Fields within the said Township of Scotton; and for exonerating from Tithes the Lands and Grounds in the said Township of Scotton, within the Honor of Knaresborough, and in the several Parishes of Knaresborough and Farnham in the County of York.
Wiveliscombe Inclosure Act 1828	9 Geo. 4. c. 13 Pr.	13 May 1828
An Act for inclosing Lands in the Parish of Wiveliscombe in the County of Somerset.
Cranbourne Chase (Dorset and Wiltshire) disfranchisement.	9 Geo. 4. c. 14 Pr.	23 May 1828
An Act for disfranchising Cranbourne Chase in the Counties of Dorset and Wilts.
Ousefleet Inclosure Act 1828	9 Geo. 4. c. 15 Pr.	23 May 1828
An Act for inclosing Lands in the Township of Ouse-fleet in the Parish of Whitgift in the County of York.
Axmouth Inclosure Act 1828	9 Geo. 4. c. 16 Pr.	23 May 1828
An Act for inclosing Lands in the Parish of Axmouth in the County of Devon.
Appleton Inclosure Act 1828	9 Geo. 4. c. 17 Pr.	23 May 1828
An Act for dividing, allotting, and laying in severalty Lands in the Parish of Appleton in the County of Berks.
Morwell Down Inclosure Act 1828	9 Geo. 4. c. 18 Pr.	19 June 1828
An Act for inclosing Morwell Down in the Parish of Tavistock in the County of Devon.
Gonville and Caius College, Cambridge and John Dickinson: exchange of estates.	9 Geo. 4. c. 19 Pr.	19 June 1828
An Act for effecting an Exchange between the Master or Keeper and Fellows of Gonville and Caius College in the University of Cambridge and John Dickinson Esquire.
Russ's Estate Act 1828	9 Geo. 4. c. 20 Pr.	19 June 1828
An Act for enabling the Committee or Committees of the Estate of Elizabeth Russ, a Lunatic, to sell Estates in the Parish of Clifton in the County of Gloucester, and in the Parish of Saint Philip and Jacob in the City of Bristol.
Richards's Estate Act 1828	9 Geo. 4. c. 21 Pr.	19 June 1828
An Act to enable the Trustees of the Settlement of the late Joseph Ashton Richards and Eliza his Wife, both deceased, to concur in granting Leases of Coal and other Mines under Lands in the Parish of Oldswinford in the County of Worcester, in respect of One undivided Eighth Part of such Mines.
Bishop of Winchester's Estate Act 1828	9 Geo. 4. c. 22 Pr.	19 June 1828
An Act to enable the Lord Bishop of Winchester to fell Timber on the Estates of the See, and for applying the Money to arise from the Sale thereof to the Purposes of an Act of the First and Second Years of His present Majesty, (Note: Bishop of Winchester's Estate Act 1821 (1 & 2 Geo. 4. c. 5 Pr.)) for providing a Residence for the Bishops of Winchester.
Great Washbourne Inclosure Act 1828	9 Geo. 4. c. 23 Pr.	19 June 1828
An Act for rendering valid the Award of the Commissioner and other Proceedings under an Act of the Forty-ninth Year of King George the Third, intituled "An Act for inclosing Lands in the Parish of Greet Washbourne in the County of Gloucester," (Note: Great Washbourne Inclosure Act 1809 (49 Geo. 3. c. 81 Pr.)) as to certain Lands allotted under the same to the late Henry Fowke Esquire.
Campbell's Estate Act 1828	9 Geo. 4. c. 24 Pr.	19 June 1828
An Act to amend an Act of the Thirty-second Year of the Reign of His late Majesty, (Note: Colin Campbell's Estate Act 1792 (32 Geo. 3. c. 40 Pr.)) for vesting those Parts of the Lands and Estate of Blythswood and others which lie in the County of Lanark in Trustees, for the Purpose of selling or feuing the same; and for other Purposes therein mentioned.
Rowe's Estate Act 1828	9 Geo. 4. c. 25 Pr.	19 June 1828
An Act for vesting an undivided Moiety of certain Estates and Hereditaments in the Counties of Lincoln and Hereford, devised by the Will of Sarah Rowe to separate Uses in strict Settlement, and also the Entirety of the Advowson of Munsley in the County of Hereford, devised as to one Moiety by the said Will of the said Sarah Rowe, and as to the other Moiety by the Will o£ Elizabeth Rowe deceased, to the same Uses as the said undivided Moiety of the said Herefordshire Estates, in Trustees, for the Purpose of selling the same, and investing the Monies arising from such Sale in the Purchase of other Estates, with Powers to pay off Incumbrances.
Breton's Estate Act 1828	9 Geo. 4. c. 26 Pr.	19 June 1828
An Act for vesting Part of the Settled Estates late of Frederick Breton Esquire, deceased, situate in the County of Southampton, in Trustees, to be sold, and for applying the Monies thence arising in the Purchase of other Estates, to be settled to the same Uses.
Butterworth's Estate Act 1828	9 Geo. 4. c. 27 Pr.	19 June 1828
An Act to enable the Trustees of the Will of Joseph Butterworth Esquire, deceased, to effect a Sale to Messieurs Hoare of Two Houses in Mitre Court, Fleet Street, in the City of London.
Richmond (Surrey) Charity Estates Act 1828	9 Geo. 4. c. 28 Pr.	19 June 1828
An Act to amend an Act of the First Year of His present Majesty, (Note: Richmond Charity Estates Act 1820 (1 Geo. 4. c. 13 Pr.)) for enabling the Trustees of certain Charity Estates, situate at Richmond in the County of Surrey, to grant building, repairing, and other Leases thereof; and to repeal certain Parts of such Act; and to direct the Application of the Income of the said Charity Estates.
Fergusson's Estate Act 1828	9 Geo. 4. c. 29 Pr.	19 June 1828
An Act for vesting in Trustees the Lands of Auldcraigoch and others in the County of Ayr, contained in a Deed of Entail made by Sir Adam Fergusson of Kilkerran Baronet, deceased, to sell the same, and apply the Price in Payment of the Debts affecting the Lands and Estate of Drummellan, lying in the same County; and for effectually entailing the said Lands and Estate of Drummellan.
Farquharson's Estate Act 1828	9 Geo. 4. c. 30 Pr.	27 June 1828
An Act for vesting in Catherine Farquharson of Invercauld, or the Heir of Entail in Possession of that Estate, certain detached Parts thereof in Fee Simple, upon entailing certain other Lands equivalent in Value thereto.
Goodrich's Estate Act 1828	9 Geo. 4. c. 31 Pr.	27 June 1828
An Act for vesting the Estates comprised in the Will of the late William Bridger Goodrich Esquire, in Trustees, to be sold, and for applying me Monies arising thereby in discharging the Incumbrances by Mortgage and Bond thereon, and laying out the Residue, under the Direction of the High Court of Chancery, in the Purchase of other Estates, to be settled to the Uses of the said Will.
Rocke's Estate Act 1828	9 Geo. 4. c. 32 Pr.	27 June 1828
An Act for vesting the Freehold and Leasehold Estates late to James Rocke of the City of Bristol, Esquire, deceased, in Trustees, to be sold for Payment of his Debts, and applying the Surplus for the Benefit of the Devisees and Legatees in the Will of the said Deceased named, and of his infant Heir at Law.
Randall's Estate Act 1828	9 Geo. 4. c. 33 Pr.	27 June 1828
An Act for enabling the Trustees under the Will of William Randall Esquire, deceased, to grant Building Leases of Part of the Freehold, Copyhold, and Leasehold Estates thereby devised, and Leases of certain Houses situate in the Parishes of Lambeth, Battersea, Christchurch, and Saint George the Martyr, in the County of Surrey, of Woolwich in the County of Kent, and of Clewer in the County of Berks, or elsewhere in England.
Marsham's Estate Act 1828	9 Geo. 4. c. 34 Pr.	15 July 1828
An Act to give Powers of Sale over Part of the Estates settled on the Marriage of Robert Marsham of Stratton, otherwise Stratton Strawless, in the County of Norfolk, Esquire, with Frances Anne his Wife; and also over Part of the Estates devised by the Will of Robert Marsham, late of Stratton other wise Stratton Strawless aforesaid, Esquire, deceased; for the Purpose of obtaining a more connected and convenient Estate, to be settled to the existing Uses of the said Settlement and Will respectively.
Hardinge's Estate Act 1828	9 Geo. 4. c. 35 Pr.	15 July 1828
An Act for effecting the Sale of certain Estates in the County of Surrey, devised by the Will of the Reverend Henry Hardinge deceased; and certain Estates in the County of Fermanagh in Ireland, devised by the Will of Sir Richard Hardinge Baronet, deceased; and certain Estates in the County of Surrey, comprised in the Settlement made on the Marriage of the Reverend Sir Charles Hardinge Baronet; and for laying out the Money arising from such Sales respectively, under the Direction of the High Court of Chancery, in the Purchase of other Estates, to be settled to the same Uses.
Fisher's Estate Act 1828	9 Geo. 4. c. 36 Pr.	15 July 1828
An Act for enabling Trustees to effect a Sale to Jonathan Brundrett of the Inner Temple, London, Gentleman, of a House in Bell Yard within the Liberty of the Rolls, devised by the Will of Joseph Fisher Gentleman, deceased.
Wynne's Estate Act 1828	9 Geo. 4. c. 37 Pr.	15 July 1828
An Act for enabling Trustees to sell, under the Authority of the High Court of Chancery, the Real Estates devised by the Will of Robert Watkin Wynne Esquire, deceased, or a sufficient Part thereof, for the Purpose of raising Monies to discharge the several Principal Sums and Interest remaining due on the Mortgages, Debts, and Legacies affecting the same Estates.
Bayley's Estate Act 1828	9 Geo. 4. c. 38 Pr.	15 July 1828
An Act for effectuating a Partition, directed by the Court of Chancery, of certain Estates situate in the Parishes of Wybunbury and Barthomley in the County of Chester, devised by the Will of Peter Bayley deceased.
Molyneux's Charities' Estates Act 1828	9 Geo. 4. c. 39 Pr.	15 July 1828
An Act for enabling the Trustees of Mrs. Ann Molyneux's Charities, in Liverpool, to grant Building and Repairing Leases, and for better vesting the Estates in them; for confirming Exchanges, and other Purposes for the Benefit of the Charities.
Lansdale's Estate Act 1828	9 Geo. 4. c. 40 Pr.	15 July 1828
An Act to effect an Exchange of Lands and Tithes situate and arising in the County of Buckingham, belonging to Richard Lansdale Yeoman, for other Lands in the same County, of which the Mayor, Bailiffs, and Burgesses of the Borough of Chepping Wycombe are seised for charitable Purposes.
Campbell's Estate Act 1828	9 Geo. 4. c. 41 Pr.	15 July 1828
An Act for vesting the Estates of John Campbell, late of Otter in the County of Argyle, in Trustees, to sell the same, or such Parts thereof as may be deemed expedient and necessary, and apply the Purchase Money arising by such Sale in Payment of the Debts and Provisions affecting the same; and for granting Power to feu certain Parts of said Entailed Estates.
Swinton and Lucas Estates.	9 Geo. 4. c. 42 Pr.	19 July 1828
An Act for authorizing the Sale of an Estate, during the Life of Anthony Daffy Swinton Gentleman, in certain Hereditaments in the County of Middlesex, now standing settled to the Uses of the Will of Joseph Lucas Esquire, deceased; and for laying out the Money in the Purchase of Estates of Inheritance, to be settled to the same Uses.
Marquis and Marchioness of Londonderry's Estate Act 1828	9 Geo. 4. c. 43 Pr.	25 July 1828
An Act to extend the Power of granting Leases of Parts of the Estates of the Most Honourable Charles William Vane Marquis of Londonderry, and Frances Anne Vane Marchioness of Londonderry his Wife.
Duke of Gordon's Estate Act 1828	9 Geo. 4. c. 44 Pr.	25 July 1828
An Act to enable George Duke of Gordon, or the Heir of Entail in Possession, to sell the Entailed Estate of Durris, and purchase other Lands in lieu thereof.
Walcott Charity Estates Act 1828	9 Geo. 4. c. 45 Pr.	28 July 1828
An Act for confirming a Partition of the Walcott Charity Estates, situate in the Parish of Lambeth in Surrey, by vesting the same in Trustees for the several Parishes of Lambeth aforesaid and Saint Olave Southwark and Saint John Horslydown, in Surrey, and for regulating the said Charities; and for empowering the Trustees of the said Charities, and also the Trustees of a certain other Charity called Hayle's Charity, in Lambeth, to grant Building and Repairing Leases.
Baron de Robeck's Divorce Act 1828 (Note: This act was not printed by the King's Printer.)	9 Geo. 4. c. 46 Pr.	21 March 1828
An Act to dissolve the Marriage of John Michael Henry Fock Baron De Robeck with Mary Margaret Baroness De Robeck his now Wife, and to enable him to marry again; and for other Purposes therein mentioned.
Jacob's Naturalization Act 1828	9 Geo. 4. c. 47 Pr.	18 April 1828
An Act for naturalizing Frederick William Jacob.
Rhayader Inclosure Act 1828	9 Geo. 4. c. 48 Pr.	23 May 1828
An Act for inclosing Lands within the Manor and Borough of Rhayader in the County of Radnor.
Pauli's Naturalization Act 1828	9 Geo. 4. c. 49 Pr.	23 May 1828
An Act for naturalizing Paulus Emilius Pauli.
Klingender's Naturalization Act 1828	9 Geo. 4. c. 50 Pr.	23 May 1828
An Act for naturalizing Frederick Charles Lewis Klingender.
Archbishop of Canterbury's Registrar Act 1828	9 Geo. 4. c. 51 Pr.	19 June 1828
An Act to authorize the Lord Archbishop of Canterbury for the Time being to appoint a Person or Persons to the Office of Registrar of his Prerogative, without a previous Surrender of the existing Grant or Grants of the said Office.
Taylor's Naturalization Act 1828	9 Geo. 4. c. 52 Pr.	15 July 1828
An Act for naturalizing Andrew Taylor.
Daelman's Naturalization Act 1828	9 Geo. 4. c. 53 Pr.	15 July 1828
An Act for naturalizing Peter Daelman.

=== Sources ===
- Simons, N., ed. (1829). "9° Georgii IV". The Statutes of the United Kingdom of Great Britain and Ireland. Vol. The Eleventh. From A.D. 1827, 7 & 8 George IV to A.D. 1829, 10 George IV. London: Eyre and Strahan. pp. 321–664 – via Internet Archive.
- Simons, N., ed. (1829). "9° Georgii IV". The Statutes of the United Kingdom of Great Britain and Ireland. Vol. The Eleventh. From A.D. 1827, 7 & 8 George IV to A.D. 1829, 10 George IV. London: Eyre and Strahan. pp. 321–664 – via Google Books.
- The Statutes of the United Kingdom of Great Britain and Ireland, 9 George IV. 1828. London. 1828 – via Internet Archive.
- Journals of the House of Commons. Vol. 83. London: His Majesty's Stationery Office. pp. 3–558.

== See also ==
- List of acts of the Parliament of the United Kingdom
