= Lunacy Act 1845 =

Act of the Parliament of the United Kingdom

- Act of Parliament
- Parliament of the United Kingdom
- Long title: An Act for the Regulation of the Care and Treatment of Lunatics.
- Citation: 8 & 9 Vict. c. 100
- Territorial extent: United Kingdom

Dates
- Royal assent: 4 August 1845
- Commencement: 4 August 1845 (Note: The Acts of Parliament (Commencement) Act 1793.)
- Repealed: 1 May 1890
Other legislation
Amends	Lunacy Act 1842
Repeals/revokes	Insane Persons (England) Act 1832; Lunatics (England) Act 1833; Lunatics Act 1835; Lunatics Act 1838; Care, etc., of Lunatics Act 1841; Lunatic Asylums Act 1842
Amended by	Lunatic Asylums, etc. Act 1846; Lunatic Asylums Act 1847; Statute Law Revision Act 1875; Statute Law Revision Act 1878; Summary Jurisdiction Act 1884
Repealed by	Lunacy Act 1890
Relates to	County Asylums Act 1845

Status: Repealed

Text of statute as originally enacted

County Asylums Act 1845
- Act of Parliament
- Parliament of the United Kingdom
- Long title: An Act to amend the Laws for the Provision and Regulation of Lunatic Asylums for Counties and Boroughs, and for the Maintenance and Care of Pauper Lunatics, in England.
- Citation: 8 & 9 Vict. c. 126
- Territorial extent: England and Wales (Note: Section 86.)

Dates
- Royal assent: 8 August 1845
- Commencement: 8 August 1845 (Note: Section 1.)
- Repealed: 1 November 1853
Other legislation
Repeals/revokes	County Asylums Act 1828
Repealed by	Lunatic Asylums Act 1853
Relates to	County Asylums Act 1808; Lunacy Act 1845

Status: Repealed

Text of statute as originally enacted

The Lunacy Act 1845 (8 & 9 Vict. c. 100) was an act of the Parliament of the United Kingdom that formed mental health law in England and Wales from 1845 to 1890. The act's most important provision was a change in the status of mentally ill people to patients.

The act was passed through Parliament simultaneously with the County Asylums Act 1845 (8 & 9 Vict. c. 126). The two acts were dependent on each other. The Lunacy Act established the Lunacy Commission and the County Asylums Act set forth most of the provisions as to what was to be monitored within the asylums and helped establish the public network of the county asylums.

== Background ==
Prior to the act, lunacy legislation in England was enshrined in the County Asylums Act 1808 (48 Geo. 3. c. 96), which established institutions for poor and for criminally insane, mentally ill people. The institutions were called asylums and they gave refuge where mental illness could receive proper treatment. The first asylum owing to the County Asylums Act opened at Northampton in 1811. By 1827 however only nine county asylums had opened and many patients were still in gaol as prisoners and criminals. As a consequence of this slow progress the Lunacy Act 1845 created the Lunacy Commission to focus on lunacy legislation. The Act was championed by Anthony Ashley-Cooper, 7th Earl of Shaftesbury.

Shaftesbury was the head of the commission from its founding in 1845 until his death in 1885. The Lunacy Commission was made up of eleven Metropolitan Commissioners. The commission was monumental as it was not only a full-time commission, but it was also salaried for six of its members. The six members of the commission that were full-time and salaried were made up of three members of the legal system and three members of the medical community. The other five members of the commission were all honorary members that simply had to attend board meetings. The duty of the Commission was to establish and carry out the provisions of the act.

== Provisions ==
Section 3 of the act established the Commissioners in Lunacy to inspect plans for asylums on behalf of the Home Secretary. Section 42 of the act required asylums, other than Bethlem Hospital, to be registered with the commission, to have written regulations and to have a resident physician. Under the act, patients lost their right of access to the courts to challenge their detention. Detention could only be reviewed by the commissioners or county visitors.

The commission had many roles in carrying out the act. It established a network of public county institutions. It monitored the conditions in the asylums and the treatment of the patients. It made a point of reaching out to patients in workhouses and prisons and getting them to the proper institutions where they could be treated. It also focused on "single lunatics" who were not connected with any prisons or workhouse but needed psychiatric care. It monitored the treatment and mental condition of patients whom the commission could not remove from prisons and workhouses.

=== Repealed enactments ===
Section 1 of the act repealed the Insane Persons (England) Act 1832 2 & 3 Will. 4. c. 107), the Lunatics (England) Act 1833 (3 & 4 Will. 4. c. 64), the Lunatics Act 1835 (5 & 6 Will. 4. c. 22), the Lunatics Act 1838 (1 & 2 Vict. c. 73), the Care, etc., of Lunatics Act 1841 (5 Vict. c. 4) and the Lunatic Asylums Act 1842 (5 & 6 Vict. c. 87).

== Subsequent developments ==
The importance of these two acts together is that they consolidated lunacy law in England. However, no legislation has ever combined the entirety of lunacy law. Both of these acts were the basis for lunacy law in England until 1890 when both of them were repealed by the Lunacy Act 1890 (53 & 54 Vict. c. 5).

The act was amended several times after its conception, including by the Lunatic Asylums, etc. Act 1846 (9 & 10 Vict. c. 84) and the Lunatic Asylums Act 1847 (10 & 11 Vict. c. 43).

The whole act was repealed by section 1 of, and the first schedule to, the Lunatic Asylums Act 1853 (16 & 17 Vict. c. 97), which came into force on 1 November 1853.

== Children and the Lunacy Act 1845 ==
When the Lunacy Act was passed in 1845, there were many questions raised about what to do with children in poor mental health. Insane children were more common than is commonly appreciated. The confusion arose because the act gave no age limits on patients in the asylums.

Some of the inspections conducted by the Lunacy Commission involved inspecting workhouses where the commission would often find mentally unhealthy children and press for them to be removed. However, many of the asylums were hesitant to admit children. Because of this, some children were admitted under the guise that they were in urgent need of help and constituted a serious danger to themselves and others.

== See also ==
- County Asylums Act 1808
- County Asylums Act 1828
- List of asylums commissioned in England and Wales
