= Insane Persons (England) Act 1832 =

Act of the Parliament of the United Kingdom

- Act of Parliament
- Parliament of the United Kingdom
- Long title: An Act for regulating for Three Years, and from thence until the End of the then next Session of Parliament, the Care and Treatment of Insane Persons in England.
- Citation: 2 & 3 Will. 4. c. 107
- Territorial extent: United Kingdom

Dates
- Royal assent: 11 August 1832
- Commencement: 11 August 1832 (Note: Section 64.)
- Expired: The end of the next session of Parliament after 11 August 1835 (Note: Section 64.)
- Repealed: 4 August 1845
Other legislation
Repeals/revokes	See § Repealed enactments
Amended by	Lunatics (England) Act 1833; Lunatics Act 1835; Lunatics Act 1838; Care, etc., of Lunatics Act 1841; Lunatic Asylums Act 1842
Repealed by	Lunacy Act 1845

Status: Repealed

Text of statute as originally enacted

The Insane Persons (England) Act 1832 (2 & 3 Will. 4. c. 107) was an act of the Parliament of the United Kingdom that consolidated enactments related to the licensing of madhouses and the care and treatment of insane persons in England.

== Provisions ==
=== Repealed enactments ===
Section 1 of the act repealed 2 enactments, listed in that section. Until commissioners, visitors and clerks were appointed under the act, the authority of those appointed under the repealed acts continued as if given by the act, and everything done or directed under the repealed acts or the act remained valid as if the repealed acts had not been repealed.

Citation	Short title	Description	Extent of repeal
9 Geo. 4. c. 41	Madhouse Act 1828	An Act to regulate the Care and Treatment of Insane Persons in England.	The whole act.
10 Geo. 4. c. 18	Care, etc., of Lunatics Act 1829	An Act to explain, amend, and alter the Act of the Ninth Year of the Reign of His present Majesty, for regulating the Care and Treatment of Insane Persons in England.	The whole act.

== Subsequent developments ==
The act was amended by the Lunatics (England) Act 1833 (3 & 4 Will. 4. c. 64).

Section 64 of the act provided that it would continue in force for three years from its passing and until the end of the next session of Parliament. It was continued by the Lunatics Act 1835 (5 & 6 Will. 4. c. 22), the Lunatics Act 1838 (1 & 2 Vict. c. 73) and the Care, etc., of Lunatics Act 1841 (5 Vict. c. 4), and was amended and continued by the Lunatic Asylums Act 1842 (5 & 6 Vict. c. 87).

The whole act was repealed by section 1 of the Lunacy Act 1845 (8 & 9 Vict. c. 100), which came into force on 4 August 1845.
