= Brought to trial =

Stage in legal proceedings where a defendant is tried in court

Brought to trial generally refers to scheduling a legal case for a hearing, or to bring a defendant to court. It has several different or ambiguous meanings and examples used in the law. To bring to trial may refer to bringing a defendant to court when the process is ongoing.

== Political, war, and other infamous crimes ==
Most often, the terms brought to trial, bring to trial, brought to justice, and bring to justice refer to the prosecution at trial of alleged war criminals, as well as political prisoners, and those accused of treason or misprision of treason, sexual assault, and other infamous crimes.

== Speedy trial ==
In some cases, the context of the term actually indicates a speedy trial issue, as guaranteed by the Sixth Amendment to the United States Constitution.

== Related terms ==
A number of related terms and meanings exist:

- "Arraign, litigate, lodge, bring a complaint, bring to view evidence, exhibit, manifest and bring together, [and] accumulate."
- "Lawsuit, suit, suit in law, suit at law, litigation, prosecution, bring a case before the court or bar, [and] bring to justice."
- To "call to the bar, ... take silk, take to the law, bring to the bar, put on trial, pull up, accuse, ... file a claim, [and] inform against."
- When the parties in a mediation or settlement conference can not come to an alternate dispute resolution, the action is brought to trial.

=== In the United Kingdom ===
Schedule 1 of the Interpretation Act 1978 states:

"Committed for trial" means—

(a) in relation to England and Wales, committed in custody or on bail by a magistrates’ court pursuant to section 6 of the Magistrates’ Courts Act 1980, or by any judge or other authority having power to do so, with a view to trial before a judge and jury; [1889]

(b) in relation to Northern Ireland, committed in custody or on bail by a magistrates’ court pursuant to Article 37 of the Magistrates' Courts (Northern Ireland) Order 1981, or by a court, judge, resident magistrate or other authority having power to do so, with a view to trial on indictment. [1st January 1979]

In relation to England and Wales, "sent for trial" means, in relation to England and Wales, sent by a magistrates' court to the Crown Court for trial pursuant to section 51 or 51A of the Crime and Disorder Act 1998.
