= Appointee =

Appointee may refer to:

- a member who is appointed to a position or office is called an appointee; in law, such a term is applied to one who is granted power of appointment of property
- appointee (French: appointé), a foot soldier in the French army, who, for long service and bravery, received more pay than other privates. Such rank is still used in the Swiss Army
- the third most lower rank of the Italian Corps of Carabineers
- the third most lower rank of the Swiss Armed Forces
- a corporate appointee in the United Kingdom, who manages the finances of a vulnerable person
