= Party participation in the mediation process =

Party participation in the mediation process is the crux of the mediation process. When parties agree to a mediation process, they then have the power vested in them to arrive at a mutually acceptable solution to the dispute. The mediator has power over the process, but not the outcome. The mediator should be impartial and have no influence or control over the outcome. The mediation is an endeavour by the parties to reach an agreement, usually to avoid, or in preference to a court based processes.

== Neutrality of the process ==
The success of mediation as a "win/win" alternative dispute resolution method is most often attributed to its qualities as a consensual, voluntary and fair process. Therefore, mediation is framed as a process which is neutral and procedurally fair, designed to increase party participation and self-determination through decision-making and to create a mutually acceptable outcome.

The expectation is for all parties to participate in the mediation process. However, because the participation of the parties and the mediator is voluntary, the parties and or the mediator have the freedom to leave the process at any time.

== Refusal to participate ==
Procedural fairness could become an issue in an employment dispute where a worker refuses to participate in a mediation process, especially if a dismissal was the result. In the instance of legitimate reasons for absence, such as ill health, a representative may be nominated to act in that party's best interests. Parties are expected to act in a civil and courteous manner, to act in a positive way and be prepared to be flexible in order to reach a mutually acceptable agreement. Mediators are expected to facilitate constructive participation by the parties. Party participation is an important indicator since mediation is a voluntary decision and cannot progress without all the parties’ agreement to participatory commitment.

== Results ==
If the case can not be mediated or settled in a conference, then the matter or case may be brought to trial.

== See also ==
- Alternate dispute resolution
- Arbitration
- Brought to trial
- Dispute resolution
- Mediation
- Settlement
- Settlement conference
- Trial (law)
