= Judge's chambers =

Office room used by a judge

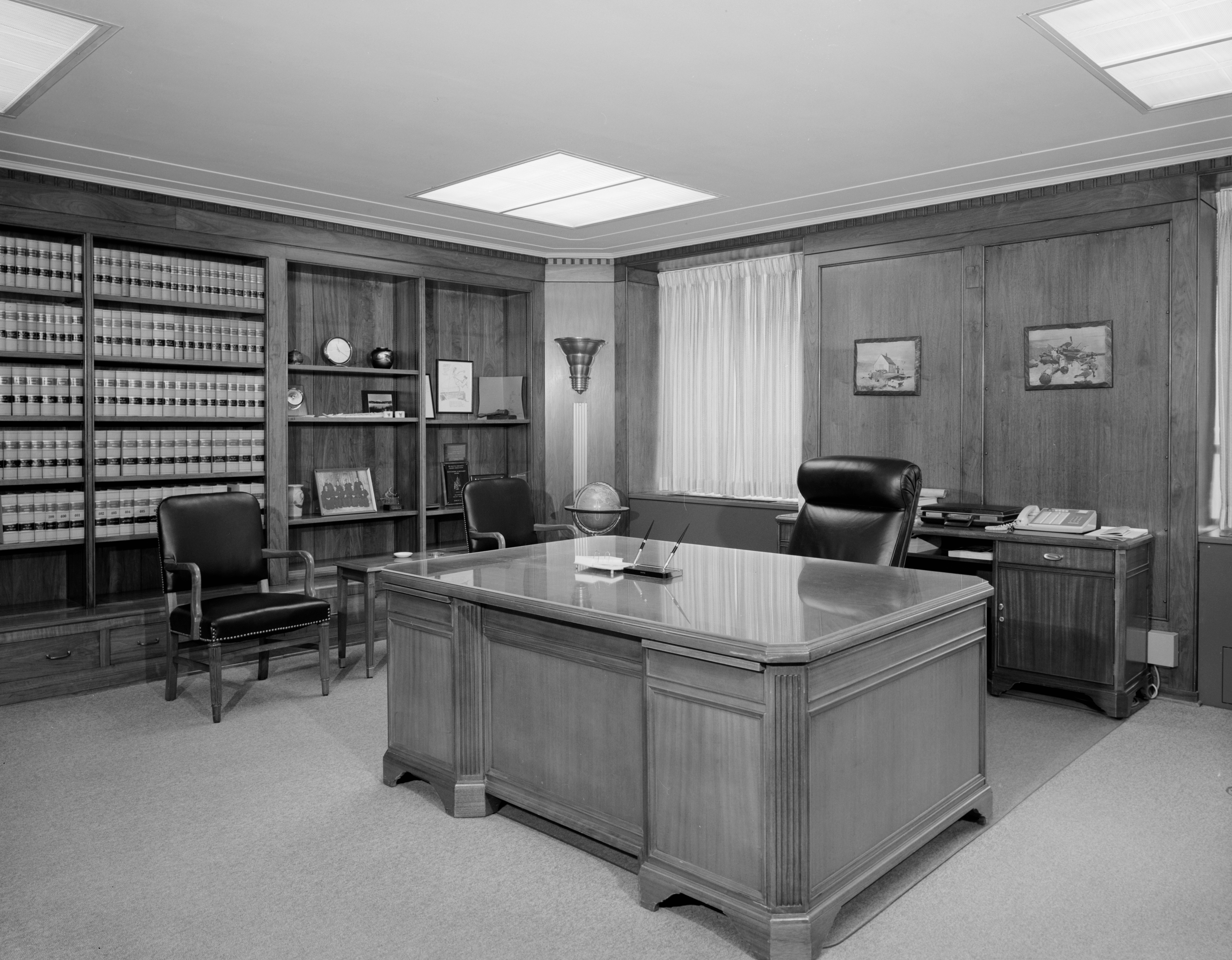
A judge's chambers in a federal courthouse in Seattle, USA

A judge's chambers is the office of a judge, where the judge may hear certain types of cases, instead of in open court.

== Description ==
A judge's chambers is the office of a judge, where certain types of matters can be heard "in chambers", also known as in camera, rather than in open court. Generally, cases heard in chambers are cases, or parts of cases, in which the public and press are not allowed to observe the procedure. Judge's chambers are often located on upper floors of the courthouse, away from the courtrooms, sometimes in groupings of judge's chambers; however, they may also be directly adjacent to the courtroom to which the judge is assigned. In some jurisdictions, a courtroom, rather than the judge's actual chambers, is used to hear matters "in chambers". Such courtrooms may also be called "chambers".

== History ==
In English legal history, there was no such statutory sanction for the process before 1821, though the custom can be traced back to the 17th century. That year, an act of Parliament provided for sittings in chambers between terms, and an act of Parliament of 1822 empowered the sovereign to call upon the judges by warrant to sit in chambers on as many days in vacation as should seem fit; later the Law Terms Act 1830 defined the jurisdiction to be exercised at chambers. The Judges' Chambers Act 1867 was the first act, however, to lay down proper regulations for chamber work, and the Supreme Court of Judicature Act 1873 preserved that jurisdiction and gave power to increase it thereafter.
