= List of acts of the Parliament of the United Kingdom from 1830 =

This is a complete list of acts of the Parliament of the United Kingdom for the year 1830.

Note that the first parliament of the United Kingdom was held in 1801; parliaments between 1707 and 1800 were either parliaments of Great Britain or of Ireland). For acts passed up until 1707, see the list of acts of the Parliament of England and the list of acts of the Parliament of Scotland. For acts passed from 1707 to 1800, see the list of acts of the Parliament of Great Britain. See also the list of acts of the Parliament of Ireland.

For acts of the devolved parliaments and assemblies in the United Kingdom, see the list of acts of the Scottish Parliament, the list of acts of the Northern Ireland Assembly, and the list of acts and measures of Senedd Cymru; see also the list of acts of the Parliament of Northern Ireland.

The number shown after each act's title is its chapter number. Acts passed before 1963 are cited using this number, preceded by the year(s) of the reign during which the relevant parliamentary session was held; thus the Union with Ireland Act 1800 is cited as "39 & 40 Geo. 3 c. 67", meaning the 67th act passed during the session that started in the 39th year of the reign of George III and which finished in the 40th year of that reign. Note that the modern convention is to use Arabic numerals in citations (thus "41 Geo. 3" rather than "41 Geo. III"). Acts of the last session of the Parliament of Great Britain and the first session of the Parliament of the United Kingdom are both cited as "41 Geo. 3". Acts passed from 1963 onwards are simply cited by calendar year and chapter number.

All modern acts have a short title, e.g. the Local Government Act 2003. Some earlier acts also have a short title given to them by later acts, such as by the Short Titles Act 1896.

== 11 Geo. 4 & 1 Will. 4 ==
The fourth session of the 8th Parliament of the United Kingdom, which met from 4 February 1830 until 23 July 1830.

This session was also traditionally cited as 11 Geo. 4, 11 G. 4, 11 Geo. 4 & 1 Gul. 4, 11 Geo. 4 & 1 Wm. 4, 11 Geo. 4 & 1 W. 4, 11 G. 4 & 1 Will. 4, 11 G. 4 & 1 Gul. 4, 1 G. 4 & 1 Wm. 4 or 11 G. 4 & 1. W. 4.

=== Public general acts ===
Short title	Citation	Royal assent
Long title
Transfer of Balance of Fees Act 1830 (repealed)	11 Geo. 4 & 1 Will. 4. c. 1	4 March 1830
An Act to authorize the Transfer of certain Balances in the Hands of the Clerks of the Peace of the several Counties of England and Wales on account of Lunatic Asylum Licences. (Repealed by Statute Law Revision Act 1873 (36 & 37 Vict. c. 91))
Supply Act 1830 (repealed)	11 Geo. 4 & 1 Will. 4. c. 2	4 March 1830
An Act to apply certain Sums of Money, out of the Consolidated Fund, and from the Aids granted for the Year One thousand eight hundred and twenty-nine, to the Service of the Year One thousand eight hundred and thirty. (Repealed by Statute Law Revision Act 1873 (36 & 37 Vict. c. 91))
Exchequer Bills Act 1830 (repealed)	11 Geo. 4 & 1 Will. 4. c. 3	19 March 1830
An Act for raising the Sum of Twelve Millions by Exchequer Bills, for the service of the Year One thousand eight hundred and thirty. (Repealed by Statute Law Revision Act 1873 (36 & 37 Vict. c. 91))
Supply (No. 2) Act 1830 (repealed)	11 Geo. 4 & 1 Will. 4. c. 4	19 March 1830
An Act for appropriating certain Sums to the Service of the Year One thousand eight hundred and thirty. (Repealed by Statute Law Revision Act 1873 (36 & 37 Vict. c. 91))
Jersey, etc., Paupers Removal Act 1830 (repealed)	11 Geo. 4 & 1 Will. 4. c. 5	19 March 1830
An Act to repeal the Provisions of certain Acts relating to the Removal of vagrant and poor Persons born in the Isles of Jersey and Guernsey, and chargeable to Parishes in England; and to make other Provisions in lieu thereof. (Repealed by Poor Removal Act 1845 (8 & 9 Vict. c. 117))
Duties on Personal Estates, etc. Act 1830 (repealed)	11 Geo. 4 & 1 Will. 4. c. 6	23 March 1830
An Act for continuing to His Majesty for One Year certain Duties on Personal Estates, Offices, and Pensions in England, for the Service of the Year One thousand eight hundred and thirty. (Repealed by Statute Law Revision Act 1873 (36 & 37 Vict. c. 91))
Mutiny Act 1830 (repealed)	11 Geo. 4 & 1 Will. 4. c. 7	23 March 1830
An Act for punishing Mutiny and Desertion; and for the better Payment of the Army and their Quarters. (Repealed by Statute Law Revision Act 1873 (36 & 37 Vict. c. 91))
Marine Mutiny Act 1830 (repealed)	11 Geo. 4 & 1 Will. 4. c. 8	23 March 1830
An Act for the Regulation of His Majesty's Royal Marine Forces while on Shore. (Repealed by Statute Law Revision Act 1873 (36 & 37 Vict. c. 91))
Indemnity Act 1830 (repealed)	11 Geo. 4 & 1 Will. 4. c. 9	8 April 1830
An Act to indemnify such Persons in the United Kingdom as have omitted to qualify themselves for Offices and Employments, and for extending the Time limited for those Purposes respectively until the Twenty-fifth Day of March One thousand eight hundred and thirty-one; to permit such Persons in Great Britain as have omitted to make and file Affidavits of the Execution of Indentures of Clerks to Attorneys and Solicitors, to make and file the same on or before the First Day of Hilary Term One thousand eight hundred and thirty-one; and to allow Persons to make and file such Affidavits, although the Persons whom they served shall have neglected to take out their Annual Certificates. (Repealed by Promissory Oaths Act 1871 (34 & 35 Vict. c. 48))
Smugglers' Families Act 1830 (repealed)	11 Geo. 4 & 1 Will. 4. c. 10	8 April 1830
An Act for the Relief of Parishes from the Expenses of maintaining the Wives and Families of Men convicted under the Laws for the Prevention of Smuggling, and sentenced to serve His Majesty in His Naval Service. (Repealed by Statute Law Revision Act 1861 (24 & 25 Vict. c. 101))
Security of Rents, Durham Act 1830 (repealed)	11 Geo. 4 & 1 Will. 4. c. 11	8 April 1830
An Act for extending certain Provisions of an Act of the Eighth Year of Queen Anne, (Note: Landlord and Tenant Act 1709 (8 Ann. c. 18)) for the better Security of Rents, and to prevent Frauds committed by Tenants regarding Executions, to certain Process in use within the County Palatine of Durham and Sadberge. (Repealed by Statute Law Revision (No. 2) Act 1888 (51 & 52 Vict. c. 57))
East Retford Election Act 1830 (repealed)	11 Geo. 4 & 1 Will. 4. c. 12	26 April 1830
An Act to indemnify Witnesses who may give Evidence, before the Lords Spiritual and Temporal, on a Bill to prevent Bribery and Corruption in the Election of Burgesses to serve in Parliament for the Borough of East Retford. (Repealed by Statute Law Revision Act 1873 (36 & 37 Vict. c. 91))
National Debt Act 1830 (repealed)	11 Geo. 4 & 1 Will. 4. c. 13	3 May 1830
An Act for transferring certain Annuities of Four Pounds per Centum per Annum into Annuities of Three Pounds and Ten Shillings or Five Pounds per Centum per Annum. (Repealed by Statute Law Revision Act 1870 (33 & 34 Vict. c. 69))
Markets in Saint Pancras Parish, Middlesex Act 1830 (repealed)	11 Geo. 4 & 1 Will. 4. c. 14	3 May 1830
An Act for removing the Market at present held for the Sale of Hay and Straw from the Haymarket; and for establishing Markets for the Sale of Hay, Straw, and other Articles, in York Square, Clarence Gardens, and Cumberland Market, in the Parish of Saint Pancras in the County of Middlesex. (Repealed by Cumberland Market (St. Pancras) Act 1931 (21 & 22 Geo. 5. c. xxi))
Northern Lighthouses Act 1830 (repealed)	11 Geo. 4 & 1 Will. 4. c. 15	3 May 1830
An Act for relieving, in certain Cases, Vessels entering or sailing from the Port of Berwick-upon-Tweed, from the Duties leviable under Two Acts passed in the Forty-sixth (Note: Cape Rock Lighthouse (Scotland) Act 1806 (46 Geo. 3. c. 132)) and Fifty-fourth (Note: Northern Lighthouse Commissioners Act 1814 (54 Geo. 3. c. 136)) Years of His late Majesty's Reign, relating to the Northern Lighthouses. (Repealed by Statute Law Revision Act 1873 (36 & 37 Vict. c. 91))
Leather Duties Repeal Act 1830 (repealed)	11 Geo. 4 & 1 Will. 4. c. 16	29 May 1830
An Act to repeal the Duties of Excise and Drawbacks on Leather, and the Laws relating thereto. (Repealed by Statute Law Revision Act 1873 (36 & 37 Vict. c. 91))
Excise Laws Relating to Malt Act 1830 (repealed)	11 Geo. 4 & 1 Will. 4. c. 17	29 May 1830
An Act to alter and amend an Act of the Seventh and Eighth Years of His present Majesty, (Note: Excise on Malt Act 1827 (7 & 8 Geo. 4. c. 52)) for consolidating and amending the Laws of Excise on Malt made in the United Kingdom, and for amending the Laws relating to Brewers in Ireland, and the Malt Allowance on Spirits in Scotland and Ireland. (Repealed by Inland Revenue Act 1880 (43 & 44 Vict. c. 20))
Marriage Confirmation Act 1830 (repealed)	11 Geo. 4 & 1 Will. 4. c. 18	29 May 1830
An Act to render valid Marriages solemnized in certain Churches and Chapels. (Repealed by Statute Law (Repeals) Act 1977 (c. 18))
Fever Hospitals (Ireland) Act 1830 (repealed)	11 Geo. 4 & 1 Will. 4. c. 19	29 May 1830
An Act to extend the Powers of Grand Juries in the Execution of an Act of the Fifty-eighth Year of His late Majesty's Reign, (Note: Hospitals (Ireland) Act 1818 (58 Geo. 3. c. 47)) for establishing Fever Hospitals in Ireland. (Repealed by Statute Law Revision Act 1873 (36 & 37 Vict. c. 91))
Pay of the Navy Act 1830 (repealed)	11 Geo. 4 & 1 Will. 4. c. 20	29 May 1830
An Act to amend and consolidate the Laws relating to the Pay of the Royal Navy. (Repealed by Naval Discipline Act 1866 (29 & 30 Vict. c. 109))
Linen Manufacture (Ireland) Act 1830 (repealed)	11 Geo. 4 & 1 Will. 4. c. 21	29 May 1830
An Act to confirm certain Leases of Lands for the Purposes of carrying on the Linen Manufacture of Ireland. (Repealed by Statute Law Revision Act 1873 (36 & 37 Vict. c. 91))
Richmond Lunatic Asylum Act 1830 (repealed)	11 Geo. 4 & 1 Will. 4. c. 22	29 May 1830
An Act for appropriating the Richmond Lunatic Asylum in Dublin to the Purposes of a District Lunatic Asylum. (Repealed by Statute Law (Repeals) Act 1993 (c. 50))
Royal Signature by Commission Act 1830 (repealed)	11 Geo. 4 & 1 Will. 4. c. 23	29 May 1830
An Act to enable His Majesty to appoint certain Persons to affix His Majesty's Royal Signature to Instruments requiring such Signature. (Repealed by Statute Law Revision Act 1873 (36 & 37 Vict. c. 91))
Australian Agricultural Company Act 1830 (repealed)	11 Geo. 4 & 1 Will. 4. c. 24	29 May 1830
An Act to amend an Act (Note: Australian Agricultural Company Act 1824 (5 Geo. 4. c. 86)) for granting certain Powers and Authorities to a Company to be incorporated by Charter, to be called "The Australian Agricultural Company," for the Cultivation and Improvement of Waste Lands in the Colony of New South Wales, and for other Purposes relating thereto. (Repealed by Australian Agricultural Company Act 1912 (2 & 3 Geo. 5. c. xlviii))
Criminal Returns Act 1830 (repealed)	11 Geo. 4 & 1 Will. 4. c. 25	17 June 1830
An Act to repeal an Act of the Fifty-fifth Year of His late Majesty, (Note: Return of Persons Committed, etc. Act 1815 (55 Geo. 3. c. 49)) for procuring Returns of Persons committed, tried, and convicted for Criminal Offences and Misdemeanors. (Repealed by Statute Law Revision Act 1873 (36 & 37 Vict. c. 91))
National Debt Act 1830 (repealed)	11 Geo. 4 & 1 Will. 4. c. 26	17 June 1830
An Act to authorize the issuing of Exchequer Bills for the Payment of the Proprietors of Four Pounds per Centum Annuities in England and Ireland who have signified their Dissent under an Act (Note: National Debt Act 1830 (11 Geo. 4 & 1 Will. 4. c. 13)) passed in the present Session for transferring such Annuities into Three Pounds Ten Shillings per Centum Annuities. (Repealed by Statute Law Revision Act 1873 (36 & 37 Vict. c. 91), Statute Law Revision (No. 2) Act 1888 (51 & 52 Vict. c. 57), Government Annuities Act 1929 (19 & 20 Geo. 5. c. 29) and Statute Law Revision Act 1950 (14 Geo. 6. c. 6))
Lighting, etc., of Parishes (England) Act 1830 (repealed)	11 Geo. 4 & 1 Will. 4. c. 27	17 June 1830
An Act to make Provision for the lighting and watching of Parishes in England and Wales. (Repealed by Lighting and Watching Act 1833 (3 & 4 Will. 4. c. 90))
Supply Act 1830 (repealed)	11 Geo. 4 & 1 Will. 4. c. 28	23 June 1830
An Act to apply a certain Sum of Money out of the Consolidated Fund to the Service of the Year One thousand eight hundred and thirty. (Repealed by Statute Law Revision Act 1873 (36 & 37 Vict. c. 91))
Militia Ballots Suspension Act 1830 (repealed)	11 Geo. 4 & 1 Will. 4. c. 29	23 June 1830
An Act to suspend, until the End of the next Session of Parliament, the making of Lists and the Ballots and Enrolments for the Militia of the United Kingdom. (Repealed by Statute Law Revision Act 1873 (36 & 37 Vict. c. 91))
Census (Great Britain) Act 1830 or the Population Act 1830 (repealed)	11 Geo. 4 & 1 Will. 4. c. 30	23 June 1830
An Act for taking an Account of the Population of Great Britain, and of the Increase or Diminution thereof. (Repealed by Statute Law Revision Act 1873 (36 & 37 Vict. c. 91))
Malt Duty (Ireland) Act 1830 (Note: This was the last act of the reign of King George IV.) (repealed)	11 Geo. 4 & 1 Will. 4. c. 31	23 June 1830
An Act for reducing the Duty on Malt made from Bear or Bigg only, in Ireland, to the same Duty as is now payable thereon in Scotland. (Repealed by Inland Revenue Act 1880 (43 & 44 Vict. c. 20))
Banks (Ireland) Act 1830 (Note: This was the first act of the reign of King William IV.) (repealed)	11 Geo. 4 & 1 Will. 4. c. 32	16 July 1830
An Act to explain Two Acts (Note: Bank of Ireland Act 1781 (21 & 22 Geo. 3. c. 16 (I))) (Note: Bank of Ireland Act 1821 (1 & 2 Geo. 4. c. 72)) of His present Majesty, for establishing an Agreement with the Governor and Company of the Bank of Ireland, for advancing the Sum of Five hundred thousand Pounds, Irish Currency, and for the better Regulation of Copartnerships of certain Bankers in Ireland. (Repealed by Statute Law Revision Act 1963 (c. 30))
Insolvent Debtors (Ireland) Act 1830 (repealed)	11 Geo. 4 & 1 Will. 4. c. 33	16 July 1830
An Act to continue for One Year, and from thence until the End of the then next Session of Parliament, the Acts for the Relief of Insolvent Debtors in Ireland. (Repealed by Statute Law Revision Act 1873 (36 & 37 Vict. c. 91))
Shubenaccadie Canal, Nova Scotia Act 1830 (repealed)	11 Geo. 4 & 1 Will. 4. c. 34	16 July 1830
An Act to authorise the Advance of a certain Sum, out of the Consolidated Fund, for the Completion of the Shubenaccadie Canal in Nova Scotia. (Repealed by Statute Law Revision Act 1874 (37 & 38 Vict. c. 35))
Assessed Taxes Act 1830 (repealed)	11 Geo. 4 & 1 Will. 4. c. 35	16 July 1830
An Act to continue Compositions for Assessed Taxes for a further Term of One Year, and to grant Relief from and alter and repeal the said Duties in certain Cases. (Repealed by Revenue Act 1869 (32 & 33 Vict. c. 14))
Contempt of Court Act 1830 (repealed)	11 Geo. 4 & 1 Will. 4. c. 36	16 July 1830
An Act for altering and amending the Law regarding Commitments by Courts of Equity for Contempts, and the taking Bills pro Confesso. (Repealed by Statute Law Revision Act 1963 (c. 30))
Criminal Law (Scotland) Act 1830	11 Geo. 4 & 1 Will. 4. c. 37	16 July 1830
An Act to amend an Act of the Ninth Year of His late Majesty King George the Fourth, (Note: Circuit Courts (Scotland) Act 1828 (9 Geo. 4. c. 29)) to facilitate Criminal Trials in Scotland, and to abridge the Period now required between the pronouncing of Sentence and Execution thereof, in Cases importing a Capital Punishment.
Insolvent Debtors (England) Act 1830 (repealed)	11 Geo. 4 & 1 Will. 4. c. 38	16 July 1830
An Act to continue and amend the Laws for the Relief of Insolvent Debtors in England. (Repealed by Statute Law Revision Act 1873 (36 & 37 Vict. c. 91))
Transportation Act 1830 (repealed)	11 Geo. 4 & 1 Will. 4. c. 39	16 July 1830
An Act to amend an Act passed in the Fifth Year of His present Majesty, (Note: Transportation Act 1824 (5 Geo. 4. c. 84)) for the Transportation of Offenders from Great Britain; and for punishing Offences committed by Transports kept to labour in the Colonies. (Repealed for England and Wales by Criminal Justice Act 1948 (11 & 12 Geo. 6. c. 58), for Scotland by Criminal Justice (Scotland) Act 1949 (12, 13 & 14 Geo. 6. c. 94) and for Northern Ireland by Statute Law Revision Act 1963 (c. 30))
Executors Act 1830 (repealed)	11 Geo. 4 & 1 Will. 4. c. 40	16 July 1830
An Act for making better Provision for the Disposal of the undisposed of Residues of the Effects of Testators. (Repealed by Law of Property (Amendment) Act 1924 (15 & 16 Geo. 5. c. 5) and Administration of Estates Act 1925 (15 & 16 Geo. 5. c. 23))
Army Pensions Act 1830 (repealed)	11 Geo. 4 & 1 Will. 4. c. 41	16 July 1830
An Act to make further Regulations with respect to Army Pensions. (Repealed by Statute Law (Repeals) Act 1976 (c. 16))
Treasurer of the Navy Act 1830 (repealed)	11 Geo. 4 & 1 Will. 4. c. 42	16 July 1830
An Act to consolidate and amend the several Acts relating to the Office of Treasurer of His Majesty's Navy. (Repealed by Statute Law Revision Act 1874 (37 & 38 Vict. c. 35))
Demise of the Crown Act 1830 (repealed)	11 Geo. 4 & 1 Will. 4. c. 43	16 July 1830
An Act to abolish certain Fees and Stamp Duties chargeable on the Renewal of all Appointments, Commissions, Grants, Pensions, and Patents consequent on the Demise of the Crown. (Repealed by Statute Law (Repeals) Act 1977 (c. 18))
Arms (Ireland) Act 1830 (repealed)	11 Geo. 4 & 1 Will. 4. c. 44	16 July 1830
An Act to regulate, for One Year, the Importation of Arms, Gunpowder, and Ammunition into Ireland, and the making removing, selling, and keeping of Arms, Gunpowder, and Ammunition in Ireland. (Repealed by Arms, etc. (Ireland) Act 1843 (6 & 7 Vict. c. 74))
Customs Act 1830 (repealed)	11 Geo. 4 & 1 Will. 4. c. 45	16 July 1830
An Act to subject to Duties of Customs Goods the Property of the Crown, in Case of Sale after Importation. (Repealed by Customs (Repeal) Act 1833 (3 & 4 Will. 4. c. 50))
Illusory Appointments Act 1830 (repealed)	11 Geo. 4 & 1 Will. 4. c. 46	16 July 1830
An Act to alter and amend the Law relating to Illusory Appointments. (Repealed for England and Wales by Law of Property Act 1925 (15 & 16 Geo. 5. c. 20))
Debts Recovery Act 1830 (repealed)	11 Geo. 4 & 1 Will. 4. c. 47	16 July 1830
An Act for consolidating and amending the Laws for facilitating the Payment of Debts out of Real Estate. (Repealed for England and Wales by Administration of Estates Act 1925 (15 & 16 Geo. 5. c. 23) and for Northern Ireland by Administration of Estates Act (Northern Ireland) 1955 (c. 24 (N.I)))
Duties on Spirits Act 1830 (repealed)	11 Geo. 4 & 1 Will. 4. c. 48	16 July 1830
An Act to impose an additional Duty of Customs on Spirits the Produce of the British Possessions in America. (Repealed by Customs (Repeal) Act 1833 (3 & 4 Will. 4. c. 50))
Excise Act 1830 (repealed)	11 Geo. 4 & 1 Will. 4. c. 49	16 July 1830
An Act to impose additional Duties of Excise on Spirits. (Repealed by Statute Law Revision Act 1875 (38 & 39 Vict. c. 66))
Sugar Duties Act 1830 (repealed)	11 Geo. 4 & 1 Will. 4. c. 50	16 July 1830
An Act for granting to His Majesty, until the Fifth Day of April One thousand eight hundred and thirty-one, certain Duties on Sugar imported into the United Kingdom, for the Service of the Year One thousand eight hundred and thirty. (Repealed by Statute Law Revision Act 1873 (36 & 37 Vict. c. 91))
Beer Licences Act 1830 (repealed)	11 Geo. 4 & 1 Will. 4. c. 51	16 July 1830
An Act to repeal certain of the Duties on Cyder in the United Kingdom, and on Beer and Ale in Great Britain, and to make other Provisions in relation thereto. (Repealed by Customs and Excise Act 1952 (15 & 16 Geo. 6 & 1 Eliz. 2. c. 44))
Militia Pay Act 1830 (repealed)	11 Geo. 4 & 1 Will. 4. c. 52	16 July 1830
An Act to defray the Charge of the Pay, Clothing, and contingent and other Expenses of the Disembodied Militia in Great Britain and Ireland; and to grant Allowances in certain Cases to Subaltern Officers, Adjutants, Paymasters, Quartermasters, Surgeons, Assistant Surgeons, Surgeons Mates, and Serjeant Majors of the Militia, until the Twenty-fifth Day of June One thousand eight hundred and thirty-one. (Repealed by Statute Law Revision Act 1873 (36 & 37 Vict. c. 91))
Government of Quebec Act 1830 (repealed)	11 Geo. 4 & 1 Will. 4. c. 53	16 July 1830
An Act to amend so much of an Act of the Thirty-first Year of His late Majesty, (Note: Clergy Endowments (Canada) Act 1791 (31 Geo. 3. c. 31)) for making more effectual Provision for the Government of the Province of Quebec. (Repealed by Statute Law Revision Act 1874 (37 & 38 Vict. c. 35))
Fisheries (Scotland) Act 1830 (repealed)	11 Geo. 4 & 1 Will. 4. c. 54	16 July 1830
An Act to revive, continue, and amend several Acts relating to the Fisheries. (Repealed for Ireland by Fisheries (Ireland) Act 1842 (5 & 6 Vict. c. 106) and for England and Wales and Scotland by Sea Fish Industry Act 1970 (c. 11))
Bounties on Seizure of Slaves Act 1830 (repealed)	11 Geo. 4 & 1 Will. 4. c. 55	16 July 1830
An Act to reduce the Rate of Bounties payable upon the Seizure of Slaves. (Repealed by Slave Trade Act 1873 (36 & 37 Vict. c. 88))
Endowed Schools (Ireland) Act 1830 (repealed)	11 Geo. 4 & 1 Will. 4. c. 56	16 July 1830
An Act to amend an Act of the Fifty-third Year of King George the Third, (Note: Endowed Schools (Ireland) Act 1813 (53 Geo. 3. c. 107)) for the Appointment of Commissioners for the Regulation of the several Endowed Schools of public and private Foundation in Ireland. (Repealed by Statute Law Revision Act 1890 (53 & 54 Vict. c. 33) and Statute Law Revision Act (Northern Ireland) 1954 (c. 35 (N.I.)))
Costs of Prosecutions (Ireland) Act 1830 (repealed)	11 Geo. 4 & 1 Will. 4. c. 57	16 July 1830
An Act to explain and amend an Act of the Fifty-fifth Year of King George the Third, (Note: Criminal Costs (Dublin) Act 1815 (55 Geo. 3. c. 91)) for the Payment of Costs and Charges to Prosecutors and Witnesses in Cases of Felony in Ireland. (Repealed by Statute Law Revision Act 1874 (37 & 38 Vict. c. 35))
Common Law Courts (England) Act 1830 (repealed)	11 Geo. 4 & 1 Will. 4. c. 58	23 July 1830
An Act for regulating the Receipt and future Appropriation of Fees and Emoluments receivable by Officers of the Superior Courts of Common Law. (Repealed by Civil Procedure Acts Repeal Act 1879 (42 & 43 Vict. c. 59))
Newborough Church, St. Marylebone Chapels, etc. Act 1830	11 Geo. 4 & 1 Will. 4. c. 59	23 July 1830
An Act for endowing the Parish Church of Newborough in the County of Northampton, and Three Chapels, called Portland Chapel, Oxford Chapel, and Welbeck Chapel, situate in the Parish of Saint Mary-le-bone, in the County of Middlesex, and also a Chapel erected on Sunk Island in the River Humber.
Transfer of Trust Estates Act 1830 (repealed)	11 Geo. 4 & 1 Will. 4. c. 60	23 July 1830
An Act for amending the Laws respecting Conveyances and Transfers of Estates and Funds vested in Trustees and Mortgagees; and for enabling Courts of Equity to give Effect to their Decrees and Orders in certain Cases. (Repealed by Trustee Act 1850 (13 & 14 Vict. c. 60))
County Cess. (Ireland) Act 1830 (repealed)	11 Geo. 4 & 1 Will. 4. c. 61	23 July 1830
An Act to regulate the Applotment of County Rates and Cesses in Ireland, in certain Cases. (Repealed by Statute Law Revision Act 1873 (36 & 37 Vict. c. 91))
Exchequer Bills Act 1830 (repealed)	11 Geo. 4 & 1 Will. 4. c. 62	23 July 1830
An Act for raising the Sum of Thirteen millions six hundred and seven thousand six hundred Pounds by Exchequer Bills, for the Service of the Year One thousand eight hundred and thirty. (Repealed by Statute Law Revision Act 1873 (36 & 37 Vict. c. 91))
Appropriation Act 1830 (repealed)	11 Geo. 4 & 1 Will. 4. c. 63	23 July 1830
An Act to apply the Sum of One million five hundred thousand Pounds out of the Consolidated Fund to the Service of the Year One thousand eight hundred and thirty; and to appropriate the Supplies granted in this Session of Parliament. (Repealed by Statute Law Revision Act 1873 (36 & 37 Vict. c. 91))
Beerhouse Act 1830 (repealed)	11 Geo. 4 & 1 Will. 4. c. 64	23 July 1830
An Act to permit the general Sale of Beer and Cyder by Retail in England. (Repealed by Statute Law (Repeals) Act 1993 (c. 50))
Infants' Property Act 1830	11 Geo. 4 & 1 Will. 4. c. 65	23 July 1830
An Act for consolidating and amending the Laws relating to Property belonging to Infants, Femes Coverts, Idiots, Lunatics, and Persons of unsound Mind.
Forgery Act 1830 (repealed)	11 Geo. 4 & 1 Will. 4. c. 66	23 July 1830
An Act for reducing into One Act all such Forgeries as shall henceforth be punished with Death, and for otherwise amending the Laws relative to Forgery. (Repealed by Parochial Registers and Records Measure 1978 (No. 2))
Holyhead, Liverpool Roads Act 1830 (repealed)	11 Geo. 4 & 1 Will. 4. c. 67	23 July 1830
An Act to alter and amend several Acts for the Improvement of the Roads from London to Holyhead, and from London to Liverpool: and for the further Improvement of the said Roads. (Repealed by Statute Law (Repeals) Act 2013 (c. 2))
Carriers Act 1830	11 Geo. 4 & 1 Will. 4. c. 68	23 July 1830
An Act for the more effectual Protection of Mail Contractors, Stage Coach Proprietors, and other common Carriers for Hire, against the Loss of or Injury to Parcels or Packages delivered to them for Conveyance or Custody, the Value and Contents of which shall not be declared to them by the Owners thereof.
Court of Session Act 1830	11 Geo. 4 & 1 Will. 4. c. 69	23 July 1830
An Act for uniting the Benefits of Jury Trial in Civil Causes with the ordinary Jurisdiction of the Court of Session, and for making certain other Alterations and Reductions in the Judicial Establishments of Scotland.
Law Terms Act 1830 (repealed)	11 Geo. 4 & 1 Will. 4. c. 70	23 July 1830
An Act for the more effectual Administration of Justice in England and Wales. (Repealed by Statute Law (Repeals) Act 1986 (c. 12))
Acts of Parliament (Mistaken References) Act 1830 (repealed)	11 Geo. 4 & 1 Will. 4. c. 71	23 July 1830
An Act for correcting mistaken References to Acts of His late Majesty in Acts passed during the present Session of Parliament. (Repealed by Statute Law Revision Act 1963 (c. 30))
Delivery of Sugar out of Bond Act 1830 (repealed)	11 Geo. 4 & 1 Will. 4. c. 72	23 July 1830
An Act to allow, before the Fifth Day of July One thousand eight hundred and thirty-one, Sugar to be delivered out of Warehouse to be refined. (Repealed by Statute Law Revision Act 1873 (36 & 37 Vict. c. 91))
Libels Act 1830 (repealed)	11 Geo. 4 & 1 Will. 4. c. 73	23 July 1830
An Act to repeal so much of an Act of the Sixtieth Year of His late Majesty King George the Third, (Note: Criminal Libel Act 1819 (60 Geo. 3 & 1 Geo. 4. c. 8)) for the more effectual Prevention and Punishment of blasphemous and seditious Libels, as relates to the Sentence of Banishment for the Second Offence; and to provide some further Remedy against the Abuse of publishing Libels. (Repealed by Newspapers, Printers, and Reading Rooms Repeal Act 1869 (32 & 33 Vict. c. 24))
Bribery, East Retford Act 1830 (repealed)	11 Geo. 4 & 1 Will. 4. c. 74	23 July 1830
An Act to prevent Bribery and Corruption in the Election of Burgesses to serve in Parliament for the Borough of East Retford. (Repealed by Ballot Act 1872 (35 & 36 Vict. c. 33))
Supreme Court, Madras Act 1830 (repealed)	11 Geo. 4 & 1 Will. 4. c. 75	23 July 1830
An Act for the Relief of the Sufferers by the Insolvency of Gilbert Ricketts Esquire, formerly Registrar of the Supreme Court of Judicature at Madras. (Repealed by Statute Law Revision Act 1873 (36 & 37 Vict. c. 91))

=== Local acts ===
Short title	Citation	Royal assent
Long title
Wellington District of the Watling Street Road Act 1830 (repealed)	11 Geo. 4 & 1 Will. 4. c. i	19 March 1830
An Act for more effectually improving and maintaining the Wellington District of the Watlington-street Road, in the County of Salop. (Repealed by Watling Street (Shrewsbury and Wellington Districts) Act 1833 (3 & 4 Will. 4. c. xcix))
Great Torrington Roads Act 1830 (repealed)	11 Geo. 4 & 1 Will. 4. c. ii	19 March 1830
An Act to enlarge the Term and Powers of an Act (Note: Great Torrington Roads Act 1828 (9 Geo. 4. c. xxxv)) for more effectually improving the Roads to and from the Town of Great Torrington, in the County of Devon. (Repealed by Great Torrington Turnpike Roads Act 1865 (28 & 29 Vict. c. lxxx))
Roads from Market Harborough to Loughborough Act 1830 (repealed)	11 Geo. 4 & 1 Will. 4. c. iii	19 March 1830
An Act for more effectually repairing and improving the Roads from Market Harborough to Loughborough, and from Filling Gate to the Melton Mowbray Turnpike Road, in the County of Leicester. (Repealed by Market Harborough and Loughborough Road Act 1863 (26 & 27 Vict. c. iv))
Thirsk Turnpike Roads Act 1830	11 Geo. 4 & 1 Will. 4. c. iv	19 March 1830
An Act for repairing certain Turnpike Roads leading to and from Thirsk, in the County of York.
Roads to and from Bridport Act 1830 (repealed)	11 Geo. 4 & 1 Will. 4. c. v	19 March 1830
An Act for better repairing the Second District of Turnpike Roads leading to and from the Town of Bridport, in the County of Dorset, and for making and maintaining several Branch Roads to communicate with the same. (Repealed by Bridport (Second District) Turnpike Trust Act 1862 (25 & 26 Vict. c. xv))
Road from Horsham Act 1830 (repealed)	11 Geo. 4 & 1 Will. 4. c. vi	19 March 1830
An Act for more effectually repairing and improving the Road from Horsham to the Road leading to Guildford, at Aldford Cross Ways, with two Branches therefrom, and for making and maintaining a new Branch of Road to communicate therewith, all in the Counties of Sussex and Surrey. (Repealed by Statute Law (Repeals) Act 2013 (c. 2))
Blidworth and Pinxton Green Road (Nottinghamshire) Act 1830	11 Geo. 4 & 1 Will. 4. c. vii	19 March 1830
An Act for repairing and improving the Road from the Nottingham and Mansfield Turnpike Road, through Kirkby and Pinxton, to Carter-lane, and to the Colliery near Pinxton Green, in the Counties of Nottingham and Derby.
Salford Improvement Act 1830 (repealed)	11 Geo. 4 & 1 Will. 4. c. viii	19 March 1830
An Act for better cleansing, lighting, watching, regulating and improving the Town of Salford, in the County Palatine of Lancaster. (Repealed by Salford Improvement Act 1862 (25 & 26 Vict. c. ccv))
Longtown Roads (Cumberland) Act 1830	11 Geo. 4 & 1 Will. 4. c. ix	23 March 1830
An Act for more effectually repairing the Roads to and from Longtown, and certain other Roads communicating therewith, in the County of Cumberland.
Parishes of St. Giles in the Fields and St. George Bloomsbury Act 1830	11 Geo. 4 & 1 Will. 4. c. x	8 April 1830
An Act for the better regulation of the Affairs of the joint Parishes of Saint Giles-in-the-Fields and Saint George Bloomsbury, in the County of Middlesex, and of the separate Parishes of Saint Giles-in-the-Fields and Saint George Bloomsbury, in the same County.
Ardglass Harbour Act 1830 (repealed)	11 Geo. 4 & 1 Will. 4. c. xi	8 April 1830
An Act to enable the Commissioners of the Harbour of Ardglass, in the County of Down, to make Contracts for Works, and to borrow Money for the Improvement of the said Harbour. (Repealed by Northern Ireland Fishery Harbour Authority Order (Northern Ireland) 1973 (SR (NI) 1973/35))
Axmouth Harbour Act 1830	11 Geo. 4 & 1 Will. 4. c. xii	8 April 1830
An Act for maintaining and governing the Harbour of Axmouth and Works connected therewith, in the Parish of Axmouth, in the County of Devon.
St. Katharine Dock Act 1830 (repealed)	11 Geo. 4 & 1 Will. 4. c. xiii	8 April 1830
An Act to amend and alter two several Acts passed in the sixth (Note: St. Katharine's Dock Act 1825 (6 Geo. 4. c. cv)) and tenth (Note: St. Katharine Dock Act 1829 (10 Geo. 4. c. i)) years of the reign of His present Majesty, for making and constructing certain Wet Docks, Warehouses and other Works in the Parish of Saint Botolph-without-Aldgate, and in the Parish or Precinct of Saint Katharine, near the Tower of London, in the County of Middlesex, and for enlarging and extending the Powers and Provisions of the said Acts. (Repealed by Port of London (Consolidation) Act 1920 (10 & 11 Geo. 5. c. clxxiii))
Liverpool Docks and Harbour Act 1830 (repealed)	11 Geo. 4 & 1 Will. 4. c. xiv	8 April 1830
An Act for extending and amending the several Acts relating to the Docks and Harbour of Liverpool. (Repealed by Mersey Dock Acts Consolidation Act 1858 (21 & 22 Vict. c. xcii))
Liverpool Paving and Sewerage Act 1830 (repealed)	11 Geo. 4 & 1 Will. 4. c. xv	8 April 1830
An Act for the better paving and sewerage of the Town of Liverpool, in the County Palatine of Lancaster, and for settling the Boundaries between the said Town and the Township of Kirkdale, and parts of the Townships of Everton and West Derby. (Repealed by Liverpool Corporation Act 1921 (11 & 12 Geo. 5. c. lxxiv))
Hove Improvement Act 1830 or the Brunswick Town Act 1830 or the Brunswick Square (Hove) Improvement Act 1830 or the Brunswick Square and Brunswick Terrace Improvement Act 1830	11 Geo. 4 & 1 Will. 4. c. xvi	8 April 1830
An Act for paving, lighting, watching, cleansing and otherwise improving Brunswick Square and Brunswick Terrace, and certain Streets and other Public Places upon certain Grounds, late part of a Farm called the Wick Farm, in the Parish of Hove, in the County of Sussex.
Swansea Gas Act 1830 (repealed)	11 Geo. 4 & 1 Will. 4. c. xvii	8 April 1830
An Act for better lighting with Gas the Town of Swansea, in the County of Glamorgan. (Repealed by Swansea Gas Act 1861 (24 & 25 Vict. c. xli))
Road from New Chappel to Brighton Act 1830 (repealed)	11 Geo. 4 & 1 Will. 4. c. xviii	8 April 1830
An Act for more effectually repairing and maintaining the Road from New Chappel, in the County of Surrey, to Ditcheling Bost Hills, in the County of Sussex and from thence to the Town of Brighthelmston, in the same County; and also for making and maintaining a Branch of Road from the town of Ditcheling to Clayton, in the County of Sussex. (Repealed by New Chappel, Lindfield and Brighton Road Act 1862 (25 & 26 Vict. c. lix))
Malmesbury Roads (Wiltshire) Act 1830	11 Geo. 4 & 1 Will. 4. c. xix	8 April 1830
An Act for more effectually repairing and improving the Roads from the Town of Malmesbury to Copped Hall Turnpike, Sutton Benger Church and Dauntsey Gate, in the County of Wilts.
Allesley and Canwell Gate Turnpike Road (Warwickshire, Staffordshire) Act 1830	11 Geo. 4 & 1 Will. 4. c. xx	8 April 1830
An Act for making and maintaining a Turnpike Road from Pickford Brook, in the Parish of Allesley, in the County of Warwick, to Canwell Gate, in the County of Stafford.
Newcastle-upon-Tyne and Alemouth Road Act 1830	11 Geo. 4 & 1 Will. 4. c. xxi	8 April 1830
An Act for more effectually repairing, amending, widening and improving the Road from the West Cowgate, near Newcastle-upon-Tyne, to the Alemouth Turnpike Road, in the County of Northumberland, and for making and maintaining other Roads communicating therewith.
Wakefield and Sheffield Road Act 1830 (repealed)	11 Geo. 4 & 1 Will. 4. c. xxii	8 April 1830
An Act for repairing the Road from Wakefield to Sheffield, in the County of York. (Repealed by Wakefield and Sheffield Road Act 1836 (6 & 7 Will. 4. c. liii))
Manchester and Wilmslow Road Act 1830 (repealed)	11 Geo. 4 & 1 Will. 4. c. xxiii	8 April 1830
An Act for more effectually repairing and improving the Road from Chorlton Row, near Manchester, in the County Palatine of Lancaster, to the Bridge at the Corn Mills at Wilmslow, in the County Palatine of Chester. (Repealed by Manchester and Wilmslow Turnpike Roads Act 1861 (24 & 25 Vict. c. lxxv))
Wool Bridge and Dorchester Road Act 1830	11 Geo. 4 & 1 Will. 4. c. xxiv	8 April 1830
An Act for repairing the Road from Wool Bridge, to the Borough of Dorchester, in the County of Dorset.
Roads from Gainsborough Bridge (Lincolnshire, Nottinghamshire) Act 1830 (repealed)	11 Geo. 4 & 1 Will. 4. c. xxv	8 April 1830
An Act for more effectually repairing and improving the Road from the West end of Gainsburgh Bridge to East Retford, and to Gringley-on-the-Hill, in the County of Nottingham. (Repealed by Gainsburgh Bridge to East Retford and to Gringley-on-the-Hill Roads Act 1861 (24 & 25 Vict. c. vi))
Catterick Bridge and Durham Road Act 1830	11 Geo. 4 & 1 Will. 4. c. xxvi	8 April 1830
An Act for maintaining the Road from Catterick Bridge, in the County of York, by the Towns of Yarm and Stockton, and through the Town of Sedgefield, to the City of Durham.
Road from Nantgaredig and from Brechfâ Act 1830 (repealed)	11 Geo. 4 & 1 Will. 4. c. xxvii	8 April 1830
An Act for more effectually amending, improving and maintaining the Road leading from Nantgareding to Brechfâ, and from Brechfâ to the River Tivy, near Llanlloney Church, and also a Road from Brechfâ aforesaid to Llansawel, all in the County of Carmarthen. (Repealed by Turnpike Trusts in South Wales Act 1844 (7 & 8 Vict. c. 91))
Roads in Brecon, Radnor and Glamorgan Act 1830 (repealed)	11 Geo. 4 & 1 Will. 4. c. xxviii	8 April 1830
An Act for more effectually repairing and improving several Roads in the Counties of Brecon, Radnor and Glamorgan, and for making and maintaining several new Branches of Road to communicate therewith. (Repealed by Turnpike Trusts in South Wales Act 1844 (7 & 8 Vict. c. 91))
Roads from Carmarthen Act 1830 (repealed)	11 Geo. 4 & 1 Will. 4. c. xxix	8 April 1830
An Act for more effectually maintaining and repairing several Roads from Carmarthen to Lampeterpontstephen, so far as relates to the Carmarthen District of Roads, and certain other Roads in the said County of Carmarthen. (Repealed by Turnpike Trusts in South Wales Act 1844 (7 & 8 Vict. c. 91))
Road from Bolton-le-Moors to Blackburn Act 1830	11 Geo. 4 & 1 Will. 4. c. xxx	8 April 1830
An Act for more effectually repairing and improving the Road from Bolton-le-Moors to Blackburn, in the County Palatine of Lancaster, with two Branches of Road therefrom, and for making and maintaining a Branch of Road to or near the Village of Lower Darwen.
Road from Edenfield Chapel to Little Bolton (Lancashire) Act 1830 (repealed)	11 Geo. 4 & 1 Will. 4. c. xxxi	8 April 1830
An Act for more effectually repairing and improving the Road from or near Edenfield Chapel to Little Bolton, and the Road leading from and out of the said Road at Booth Pits to or near Bury Bridge, in the County Palatine of Lancaster, and for making and maintaining three several Branches of Road communicating therewith. (Repealed by Road from Edenfield Chapel to Little Bolton (Lancashire) Act 1839 (2 & 3 Vict. c. xlvii))
Road from Congleton to Thatchmarsh Bottom (Cheshire, Derbyshire) Act 1830 (repealed)	11 Geo. 4 & 1 Will. 4. c. xxxii	8 April 1830
An Act for repairing, amending and maintaining the Road from Congleton, in the County of Chester, to a Branch of the Leek Turnpike Road at Thatchmarsh Bottom, in the Parish of Hartington, in the County of Derby, and from the Lowe to the Havannah Mills, in the said County of Chester. (Repealed by Congleton and Buxton Turnpike Road Act 1866 (29 & 30 Vict. c. lvi))
East India Company and Rajah of Tanjore Act 1830 (repealed)	11 Geo. 4 & 1 Will. 4. c. xxxiii	26 April 1830
An Act to continue an Act of the fifth year of His present Majesty, (Note: East India Company and the Rajah of Tanjore Act 1824 (5 Geo. 4. c. cxvii)) for enabling the Commissioners acting in execution of an Agreement made between the East India Company and the Private Creditors of the late Rajah of Tanjore the better to carry the same into effect. (Repealed by Statute Law (Repeals) Act 2008 (c. 12))
Roads from Radstock Act 1830	11 Geo. 4 & 1 Will. 4. c. xxxiv	26 April 1830
An Act for more effectually repairing and otherwise improving several Roads from Radstock to Buckland, Dinham, Kilmersdon, Babington and Hallatrow, and from Norton Down to Norton Saint Philip, in the County of Somerset.
Merlin's Bridge and Pembroke Ferry Road Act 1830 (repealed)	11 Geo. 4 & 1 Will. 4. c. xxxv	26 April 1830
An Act for improving and maintaining the Road from Merlin's Bridge to Pembroke Ferry, in the County of Pembroke. (Repealed by Turnpike Trusts in South Wales Act 1844 (7 & 8 Vict. c. 91))
Dundee Gas Act 1830	11 Geo. 4 & 1 Will. 4. c. xxxvi	3 May 1830
An Act for incorporating the Dundee Gas-Light Company, and for the better lighting the Town of Dundee by Gas.
Road from Wootton Bassett to the Swindon and Marlborough Road Act 1830	11 Geo. 4 & 1 Will. 4. c. xxxvii	3 May 1830
An Act for more effectually repairing the Road from Wootton Bassett, in the County of Wilts, to the Two-mile Stone in the Turnpike Road leading from Swindon to Marlborough, in the said County.
Haverhill to Redcross Road (Suffolk, Cambridgeshire) Act 1830 (repealed)	11 Geo. 4 & 1 Will. 4. c. xxxviii	3 May 1830
An Act for maintaining the Road from Haverhill, in the County of Suffolk, to Redcross, in the Parish of Great Shelford, in the County of Cambridge. (Repealed by Statute Law (Repeals) Act 2008 (c. 12))
Great Yarmouth and Acle Turnpike Road Act 1830 (repealed)	11 Geo. 4 & 1 Will. 4. c. xxxix	3 May 1830
An Act for making a Turnpike Road from the Bridge over the River Bure at Great Yarmouth to Acle (with certain Branches therefrom), all in the County of Norfolk. (Repealed by Statute Law (Repeals) Act 2008 (c. 12))
Church of St. Augustine, Walton-on-the-Hill Act 1830	11 Geo. 4 & 1 Will. 4. c. xl	29 May 1830 (Note: The date on the King's Printer's copy is incorrectly given as 29 April 1830.)
An Act for endowing a Church in the Township of Everton, in the Parish of Walton-on-the-Hill, in the County Palatine of Lancaster.
Advocates' Widows' Fund Act 1830 (repealed)	11 Geo. 4 & 1 Will. 4. c. xli	29 May 1830
An Act to raise a Fund for Provisions to Widows of the Members of the Faculty of Advocates of Scotland. (Repealed by Advocates' Widows' and Orphans' Fund Order Confirmation Act 1968 (c. xliv))
Glasgow Magistrates and Police Act 1830	11 Geo. 4 & 1 Will. 4. c. xlii	29 May 1830
An Act for extending the Civil and Criminal Jurisdiction of the Magistrates and the Town or Burgh and Dean of Guild Courts of Glasgow, over the Lands of Blythswood and adjacent Lands, and for amending the Acts relating to the Police of the said City.
Ross Improvement Act 1830 (repealed)	11 Geo. 4 & 1 Will. 4. c. xliii	29 May 1830
An Act for paving, cleansing, draining, lighting, watching, regulating and improving the Town of Ross, and for disposing of certain Common and Waste Lands and Rights of Common, within the Parish of Ross, in the County of Hereford. (Repealed by Ross Improvement Act 1865 (28 & 29 Vict. c. cviii))
Stafford Improvement Act 1830 (repealed)	11 Geo. 4 & 1 Will. 4. c. xliv	29 May 1830
An Act for paving, lighting, watching, cleansing, regulating and improving the Streets, Lanes and other Public Passages and Places within the Borough of Stafford, in the County of Stafford. (Repealed by Local Government Board's Provisional Order Confirmation (No. 3) Act 1916 (6 & 7 Geo. 5. c. xxxiv))
Southwark Improvement Act 1830 (repealed)	11 Geo. 4 & 1 Will. 4. c. xlv	29 May 1830
An Act for paving, lighting, cleansing and otherwise improving such parts of Great Dover Street, Trinity Street, Trinity Square, and the Highways, Roads, Streets, Markets and other public Passages and Places leading out thereof or abutting thereon or adjacent thereto, all within the Parishes of Saint Mary Newington and Saint George-the-Martyr Southwark, in the County of Surrey, as do not fall within the Powers and Provisions of any existing Acts of Parliament. (Repealed by London Government (Borough of Southwark) Order in Council 1901 (SR&O 1901/275))
Little Bolton Improvement Act 1830 (repealed)	11 Geo. 4 & 1 Will. 4. c. xlvi	29 May 1830
An Act for more effectually cleansing, paving, lighting, watching, regulating and improving the Township of Little Bolton, in the County Palatine of Lancaster. (Repealed by Borough of Bolton Act 1850 (13 & 14 Vict. c. xl))
Manchester Gas and Improvement Act 1830	11 Geo. 4 & 1 Will. 4. c. xlvii	29 May 1830
An Act to amend several Acts for supplying the Town of Manchester with Gas, and for regulating and improving the same Town.
Southwold Harbour Act 1830 (repealed)	11 Geo. 4 & 1 Will. 4. c. xlviii	29 May 1830
An Act for more effectually improving the Harbour of Southwold, in the County of Suffolk. (Repealed by Pier and Harbour Orders Confirmation (No. 2) Act 1898 (61 & 62 Vict. c. cci))
River Wear and Sunderland Harbour Act 1830 (repealed)	11 Geo. 4 & 1 Will. 4. c. xlix	29 May 1830
An Act for the Improvement and Preservation of the River Wear and Port and Haven of Sunderland, in the County Palatine of Durham. (Repealed by Wear Navigation and Sunderland Dock (Consolidation and Amendment) Act 1922 (12 & 13 Geo. 5. c. lxxxiv))
Sankey Brook Navigation Act 1830	11 Geo. 4 & 1 Will. 4. c. l	29 May 1830
An Act to consolidate and amend the Acts relating to the Sankey Brook Navigation, in the County of Lancaster; and to make a Navigable Canal from the said Navigation at Fidler's Ferry, to communicate with the River Mersey at Widness Wharf, near Westbank, in the Township of Widness, in the said County.
Ellesmere and Chester Canal (Hurleston Reservoir) Act 1830	11 Geo. 4 & 1 Will. 4. c. li	29 May 1830
An Act to enable the United Company of Proprietors of the Ellesmere and Chester Canal to make a Reservoir, and to establish Vessels for the conveyance of Goods from Ellesmere Port, across the River Mersey; and also, to amend and enlarge the Powers of the Act (Note: Ellesmere and Chester Canal Act 1827 (7 & 8 Geo. 4. c. cii)) relating to the said Canal.
Othery, Middlezoy and Weston Zoyland Drainage Act 1830	11 Geo. 4 & 1 Will. 4. c. lii	29 May 1830
An Act for draining, flooding and improving certain low Lands and Grounds within the several Parishes of Othery, Middlezoy and Weston Zoyland, in the County of Somerset.
North Level Commission Act 1830	11 Geo. 4 & 1 Will. 4. c. liii	29 May 1830
An Act for improving the Drainage of the Land lying in the North Level; part of the Great Level of the Fens called Bedford Level, and in Great Portsand in the Manor of Crowland, and for providing a Navigation between Clows Cross and the Nene Outfall Cut.
River Tweed Fisheries Act 1830 (repealed)	11 Geo. 4 & 1 Will. 4. c. liv	29 May 1830
An Act for the more effectual Preservation and Increase of the Breed of Salmon; and for better regulating the Fisheries in the River Tweed, and the Rivers and Streams running into the same, and also within the Mouth or Entrance of the said River. (Repealed by Tweed Fisheries Act 1857 (20 & 21 Vict. c. cxlviii))
Sheffield Water Act 1830	11 Geo. 4 & 1 Will. 4. c. lv	29 May 1830
An Act for better supplying with Water the Town and Parish of Sheffield, in the County of York.
Wigan Branch Railway Act 1830 (repealed)	11 Geo. 4 & 1 Will. 4. c. lvi	29 May 1830
An Act for making and maintaining a Railway from the Borough of Wigan to the Liverpool and Manchester Railway, in the Borough of Newton, in the County Palatine of Lancaster, and collateral Branches to communicate therewith. (Repealed by North Union Railway Act 1834 (4 & 5 Will. 4. c. xxv))
Warrington and Newton Railway Act 1830 (repealed)	11 Geo. 4 & 1 Will. 4. c. lvii	29 May 1830
An Act to enable the Company of Proprietors of the Warrington and Newton Railway to extend the Line of the said Railway, and for repealing, explaining, altering, amending and enlarging some of the Powers and Provisions of the Act (Note: Warrington and Newton Railway Act 1829 (10 Geo. 4. c. xxxvii)) relating thereto. (Repealed by Warrington and Newton Railway Act 1835 (5 & 6 Will. 4. c. viii))
Leicester and Swannington Railway Act 1830	11 Geo. 4 & 1 Will. 4. c. lviii	29 May 1830
An Act for making and maintaining a Railway or Tramroad from the River Soar, near the West Bridge in or near the Borough of Leicester to Swannington, in the County of Leicester, and four Branches therefrom.
Leeds and Selby Railway Act 1830	11 Geo. 4 & 1 Will. 4. c. lix	29 May 1830
An Act for making a Railway from the Town of Leeds to the River Ouse, within the Parish of Selby, in the West Riding of the County of York.
Dundee and Newtyle Railway Act 1830	11 Geo. 4 & 1 Will. 4. c. lx	29 May 1830
An Act to amend an Act (Note: Dundee and Newtyle Railway Act 1826 (7 Geo. 4. c. ci)) for making a Railway from Dundee to Newtyle.
St. Helens and Runcorn Gap Railway Act 1830	11 Geo. 4 & 1 Will. 4. c. lxi	29 May 1830
An Act for making a Railway from the Cowley Hill Colliery, in the Parish of Prescot to Runcorn Gap, in the same Parish (with several Branches therefrom), all in the County Palatine of Lancaster, and for constructing a Wet Dock at the termination of the said Railway at Runcorn Gap aforesaid.
Polloc and Govan Railway Act 1830	11 Geo. 4 & 1 Will. 4. c. lxii	29 May 1830
An Act for making and maintaining a Railway from the Lands of Polloc and Govan to the River Clyde, at the Harbour of Broomielaw, in the County of Lanark, with a Branch to communicate therefrom.
Brighton, Shoreham and Lancing Road and New Shoreham Bridge Act 1830	11 Geo. 4 & 1 Will. 4. c. lxiii	29 May 1830
An Act for more effectually repairing and improving the Road from Brighton to Shoreham, for building a Bridge over the River Adur, at New Shoreham, and for making a Road to Lancing, and a Branch Road therefrom, all in the County of Sussex.
London Bridge Approaches and Fleet Market Removal Act 1830	11 Geo. 4 & 1 Will. 4. c. lxiv	29 May 1830
An Act to make further Provision for defraying the Expenses of making the Approaches to London Bridge, and the removal of Fleet Market.
Kingston-upon-Thames Bridge Act 1830	11 Geo. 4 & 1 Will. 4. c. lxv	29 May 1830
An Act for amending and extending the Provisions of an Act passed in the sixth year of the reign of His present Majesty, (Note: Kingston-upon-Thames Bridge Act 1825 (6 Geo. 4. c. cxxv)) for the rebuilding of Kingston Bridge, and for improving and making suitable Approaches thereto.
Dunham Bridge Act 1830 or the Dunham Bridge over River Trent Act 1830	11 Geo. 4 & 1 Will. 4. c. lxvi	29 May 1830
An Act for building a Bridge over the River Trent, from Dunham, in the County of Nottingham, to the opposite Shore in the County of Lincoln.
Bridge over Wensum at Heigham Act 1830 (repealed)	11 Geo. 4 & 1 Will. 4. c. lxvii	29 May 1830
An Act for building a Bridge over the River Wensum, in the Hamlet of Heigham, and the Parish of Saint Clement, in the County of the City of Norwich. (Repealed by Norwich City Council Act 1984 (c. xxiii))
Stonehouse Mill Pool Bridge Act 1830	11 Geo. 4 & 1 Will. 4. c. lxviii	29 May 1830
An Act for erecting and maintaining a Bridge over Stonehouse Mill Pool, at or near Stonehouse Mills, in the County of Devon.
Clifton Suspension Bridge Act 1830 (repealed)	11 Geo. 4 & 1 Will. 4. c. lxix	29 May 1830
An Act for building a Bridge over the River Avon, from Clifton in the County of Gloucester to the opposite Side of the River in the County of Somerset, and for making convenient Roads and Approaches to communicate therewith. (Repealed by Clifton Suspension Bridge Act 1952 (15 & 16 Geo. 6 & 1 Eliz. 2. c. xli))
Hungerford Market Company Act 1830	11 Geo. 4 & 1 Will. 4. c. lxx	29 May 1830
An Act to incorporate certain Persons, to be called "The Hungerford Market Company," for the re-establishment of a Market for the Sale of Fish, Poultry and Meat, and other articles of general consumption and use, and for other purposes.
Portman Market, Marylebone Act 1830	11 Geo. 4 & 1 Will. 4. c. lxxi	29 May 1830
An Act for establishing a Market in the Parish of Saint Mary-le-Bone, in the County of Middlesex.
Barrington's Hospital, Limerick Act 1830 (repealed)	11 Geo. 4 & 1 Will. 4. c. lxxii	29 May 1830
An Act for the Management and Direction of the Hospital founded by Joseph Barrington and his Sons, in the City of Limerick. (Repealed by Statute Law (Repeals) Act 2013 (c. 2))
Bath Hospital Act 1830	11 Geo. 4 & 1 Will. 4. c. lxxiii	29 May 1830
An Act for altering and amending an Act passed in the twelfth year of the reign of his Majesty King George the Second, (Note: Bath Hospital Act 1738 (12 Geo. 2. c. 31)) for establishing and well-governing an Hospital or Infirmary in the City of Bath, and for constructing Baths therein, and supplying the same with Water from the Hot Baths in the said City.
London Assurance Companies Act 1830 (repealed)	11 Geo. 4 & 1 Will. 4. c. lxxiv	29 May 1830
An Act to enable the London Assurance Companies and their Successors to purchase Annuities upon or for Lives, and also to lend Money or Stock upon Mortgage for the purpose of Investment. (Repealed by London Assurance Act 1891 (54 & 55 Vict. c. cxxvi))
Coventry (Rates in Foleshill) Act 1830 (repealed)	11 Geo. 4 & 1 Will. 4. c. lxxv	29 May 1830
An Act for better assessing and collecting the Poor and other Rates in the Parish of Foleshill, in the County of the City of Coventry. (Repealed by West Midlands Act 1980 (c. xi))
New Sarum Poor Relief Act 1830 (repealed)	11 Geo. 4 & 1 Will. 4. c. lxxvi	29 May 1830
An Act for better assessing and recovering the Rates for the Relief of the Poor within the City of New Sarum, and enlarging the Powers of an Act passed in the tenth year of the reign of his late Majesty King George the Third, intituled, "An Act for consolidating the Rates to be made for the Relief of the Poor of the respective Parishes of Saint Thomas, Saint Edmund and Saint Martin, in the City of New Sarum." (Note: New Sarum (Poor Relief) Act 1770 (10 Geo. 3. c. 81)) (Repealed by Salisbury Poor Relief Act 1868 (31 & 32 Vict. c. cl))
Roads, Bridges and Statute Labour in Peebles Act 1830 (repealed)	11 Geo. 4 & 1 Will. 4. c. lxxvii	29 May 1830
An Act for further regulating the Statute Labour and repairing the Highways and Bridges in the County of Peebles. (Repealed by Peebleshire Roads Act 1864 (27 & 28 Vict. c. cxciii))
Inverness County Roads, Bridges and Ferries Act 1830	11 Geo. 4 & 1 Will. 4. c. lxxviii	29 May 1830
An Act for making and maintaining Roads, Bridges and Ferries, and for converting, regulating and making effectual the Statute Labour in the County of Inverness.
Parish of Barnwell St. Andrew with Barnwell All Saints, Commutation of Tithes Act 1830	11 Geo. 4 & 1 Will. 4. c. lxxix	29 May 1830
An Act to commute for Lands and a Corn Rent, the ancient Compositions in lieu of Tithes, and Glebe Lands payable to the Rector of the Parish of Barnwell Saint Andrew, with Barnwell All Saints annexed, in the County of Northampton.
Hollingrake Letters Patent Act 1830	11 Geo. 4 & 1 Will. 4. c. lxxx	29 May 1830
An Act for prolonging the Term of certain Letters Patent granted to James Hollingrake, for an improved Method of manufacturing Copper or other Metal Rollers, and of casting and forming Metallic Substances into various forms with improved closeness and soundness of Texture.
Wendover and Buckingham Road Act 1830	11 Geo. 4 & 1 Will. 4. c. lxxxi	29 May 1830
An Act for more effectually repairing and improving the Road from Wendover to the Town of Buckingham, in the County of Buckingham.
Roads from Lewes Act 1830	11 Geo. 4 & 1 Will. 4. c. lxxxii	29 May 1830
An Act for more effectually repairing and improving the Roads from Lewes, through Offham to Witch Cross, from the Cliffe near Lewes, through Uckfield to Witch Cross, and from the said Cliffe through Ringmer, Heathfield and Burwash to Hurst Green, all in the County of Sussex.
Hockliffe and Stony Stratford Road Act 1830 (repealed)	11 Geo. 4 & 1 Will. 4. c. lxxxiii	29 May 1830
An Act for more effectually repairing and maintaining the Road between Hockliffe, in the County of Bedford, and Stony Stratford, in the County of Buckingham. (Repealed by Statute Law (Repeals) Act 2013 (c. 2))
Rotherham and Wortley Road Act 1830 (repealed)	11 Geo. 4 & 1 Will. 4. c. lxxxiv	29 May 1830
An Act for altering, improving, diverting and maintaining the Road from Rotherham to the Four-Lane Ends near Wortley, in the West Riding of the County of York. (Repealed by Rotherham and Wortley Road Act 1862 (25 & 26 Vict. c. cxix))
Blackburn and Walton-in-le-Dale Road Act 1830	11 Geo. 4 & 1 Will. 4. c. lxxxv	29 May 1830
An Act for more effectually repairing the Road from Blackburn to Walton Cop, within Walton-in-le-Dale, in the County of Lancaster.
Chard Roads Act 1830	11 Geo. 4 & 1 Will. 4. c. lxxxvi	29 May 1830
An Act for amending an Act of the last Session, intituled, "An Act for more effectually repairing and improving several Roads which lead to and through the Town and Borough of Chard, in the County of Somerset, and for making and maintaining a new Road from Chard to Drempton, in the County of Dorset," (Note: Chard Roads (Somerset) Act 1829 (10 Geo. 4. c. xciii)) and for making and maintaining other Roads communicating with the said Roads, in the Counties of Somerset, Devon and Dorset.
Bradford and Huddersfield Roads Act 1830	11 Geo. 4 & 1 Will. 4. c. lxxxvii	29 May 1830
An Act for completing, improving and maintaining the Road from Wibsey Low Moor, near Bradford, through Brighouse, to Huddersfield, with certain Diversions therefrom, in the West Riding of the County of York.
Whitesheet Hill and Barford Turnpike Road Act 1830	11 Geo. 4 & 1 Will. 4. c. lxxxviii	29 May 1830
An Act for repairing the Turnpike Road, from the top of Whitesheet Hill to the Wilton Turnpike Road, at or near Barford, in the County of Wilts.
Ashbourne, Hatton Moor, Uttoxeter and Hadley Plain Roads Act 1830 (repealed)	11 Geo. 4 & 1 Will. 4. c. lxxxix	29 May 1830
An Act for repairing, altering and improving the Roads from Ashbourne to Sudbury, and from Sudbury to Yoxall Bridge, and from Hatton Moor to Tutbury, and from Uttoxeter to or near the Village of Draycott-in-the-Clay, and from Hadley Plain, on the late Forest or Chase of Needwood, to Callingwood Plain, on the same late Forest or Chase. (Repealed by Ashbourne, Sudbury and Yoxhall Bridge, and Uttoxeter and Callingwood Plain Turnpike Road Act 1863 (26 & 27 Vict. c. xcviii))
Foston Bridge and Witham Common Road (Lincolnshire) Act 1830	11 Geo. 4 & 1 Will. 4. c. xc	29 May 1830
An Act for repairing the Road from Foston Bridge to the Division Stone on Witham Common, in the County of Lincoln.
Road from Temple Normanton and Road from Tupton Nether Green Act 1830 (repealed)	11 Geo. 4 & 1 Will. 4. c. xci	29 May 1830
An Act for more effectually repairing and improving the Road from Temple Normanton to Buntingfield Nook, in the County of Derby, and the Road from Tupton Nether Green to Stubbing Edge Lane, and Knot Cross, in the said County. (Repealed by Tupton and Ashover Road and Birkin Lane Road Act 1862 (25 & 26 Vict. c. cxlvii))
Road from Werneth to Littleborough (Lancashire) Act 1830 (repealed)	11 Geo. 4 & 1 Will. 4. c. xcii	29 May 1830
An Act for improving and maintaining the Road from Werneth to Littleborough, and other Roads communicating therewith, in the County of Lancaster. (Repealed by Road from Dryclough to Rochdale Act 1837 (7 Will. 4 & 1 Vict. c. xxxiv))
Road from Stamford to South Witham Act 1830	11 Geo. 4 & 1 Will. 4. c. xciii	29 May 1830
An Act for more effectually repairing and improving the Road leading from the Town of Stamford to the Division Stone in South Witham, in the County of Lincoln.
Birmingham and Edgehill Road Act 1830	11 Geo. 4 & 1 Will. 4. c. xciv	29 May 1830
An Act for repairing the Road from Birmingham, through Warwick and Warmington, in the County of Warwick, to the utmost limits of the said County, on Edgehill.
Derby, Mansfield and Nuttall Roads Act 1830	11 Geo. 4 & 1 Will. 4. c. xcv	29 May 1830
An Act for more effectually repairing and improving certain Roads between the Towns of Derby, Mansfield and Nutthall, in the Counties of Derby and Nottingham.
Hull and Hedon Turnpike Act 1830	11 Geo. 4 & 1 Will. 4. c. xcvi	29 May 1830
An Act for making and maintaining a new Turnpike Road from the Town of Kingston-upon-Hull, in the County of the said Town, to Hedon, in the County of York.
Tiverton Roads Act 1830 (repealed)	11 Geo. 4 & 1 Will. 4. c. xcvii	29 May 1830
An Act for improving several Roads, and making certain new Roads, in the Counties of Devon and Somerset, leading to and from the Town of Tiverton, and for amending an Act of His present Majesty, (Note: Wiveliscombe Roads Act 1825 (6 Geo. 4. c. xciii)) for repairing several Roads leading from and through the Town of Wiveliscombe. (Repealed by Tiverton Roads Act 1861 (24 & 25 Vict. c. xix))
Ashburton and Totnes Roads Act 1830 (repealed)	11 Geo. 4 & 1 Will. 4. c. xcviii	29 May 1830
An Act for more effectually repairing and improving several Roads leading to and from or near to the Towns of Ashburton and Totnes, in the County of Devon. (Repealed by Ashburton and Totnes Road Act 1835 (5 & 6 Will. 4. c. xxxv))
Tonbridge and Ightham Road Act 1830 (repealed)	11 Geo. 4 & 1 Will. 4. c. xcix	29 May 1830
An Act for amending and improving the Road from Tonbridge to Ightham, and other Roads communicating therewith, in the County of Kent. (Repealed by Tonbridge and Ightham Road Act 1866 (29 & 30 Vict. c. cx))
Cromford Bridge and Langley Mill Road Act 1830	11 Geo. 4 & 1 Will. 4. c. c	29 May 1830
An Act for more effectually repairing and improving the Road from Cromford Bridge to the Turnpike Road at or near Langley Mill, in the County of Derby.
Wareham and Purbeck Roads Act 1830 (repealed)	11 Geo. 4 & 1 Will. 4. c. ci	29 May 1830
An Act for more effectually repairing and improving several Roads leading from the Market Cross, in the Town of Wareham, and in Purbeck, in the County of Dorset. (Repealed by Wareham Turnpike Roads Act 1862 (25 & 26 Vict. c. ix))
Roads in Caithness Act 1830 (repealed)	11 Geo. 4 & 1 Will. 4. c. cii	29 May 1830
An Act for making, repairing, widening and keeping in repair certain Roads and Bridges in the County of Caithness, and for better regulating and rendering more effectual the Statute Labour in the said County, and Conversion Money in lieu thereof. (Repealed by Caithness Roads Act 1860 (23 & 24 Vict. c. cci))
Roads from Saltfleet to Lincoln Act 1830	11 Geo. 4 & 1 Will. 4. c. ciii	29 May 1830
An Act for more effectually repairing and improving the Roads from Saltfleet to the Town of Horncastle, and other Roads therein mentioned, all in the County of Lincoln.
Roads through Cowfold Act 1830	11 Geo. 4 & 1 Will. 4. c. civ	29 May 1830
An Act for more effectually repairing the Roads from Hand Cross, through Cowfold, to Corner House, and from thence to the Turnpike Road from Horsham to Steyning, and from Corner House aforesaid to the Maypole in the Town of Henfield, and certain Branches therefrom, all in the County of Sussex.
Roads from the Wirksworth Turnpike Road Act 1830	11 Geo. 4 & 1 Will. 4. c. cv	29 May 1830
An Act for improving and maintaining the Turnpike Roads from the Wirksworth Turnpike Road, in the Hamlet of Ideridgehay, to the Town of Duffield, and from the Market Place in Wirksworth to the Turnpike Road leading from Derby to Brassington, and from the said Market Place to the Turnpike Road leading from Wirksworth Moor to Matlock Bath, all in the County of Derby.
Walsall and Muckley Corner Road Act 1830	11 Geo. 4 & 1 Will. 4. c. cvi	29 May 1830
An Act for improving and maintaining the Road leading from Walsall to Muckley Corner, near Lichfield, and other Roads in the County of Stafford.
Cork and Waterford Roads Act 1830 or the Waterford Road Act 1830 (repealed)	11 Geo. 4 & 1 Will. 4. c. cvii	29 May 1830
An Act for more effectually repairing several Roads leading from the Bounds of the County of Cork to the City of Waterford. (Repealed by Waterford Road Act 1847 (10 & 11 Vict. c. l))
Turnpike Roads in Peebles Act 1830 (repealed)	11 Geo. 4 & 1 Will. 4. c. cviii	29 May 1830
An Act for more effectually repairing and keeping in repair the Turnpike Roads, in the County of Peebles, for making and maintaining certain new Roads, and for rendering Turnpike certain Parish Roads in the said County. (Repealed by Peebleshire Roads Act 1864 (27 & 28 Vict. c. cxciii))
Queensferry Roads, Linlithgow Act 1830	11 Geo. 4 & 1 Will. 4. c. cix	29 May 1830
An Act for more effectually repairing and keeping in repair the Road from Cramond Bridge to the Town of Queensferry, the Road leading westward therefrom, through Dalmeny to Echline, and the Road from the west end of the said Town of Queensferry, to the Town of Linlithgow, in the County of Linlithgow.
Road from Carlisle to Penrith and to Eamont Bridge Act 1830 (repealed)	11 Geo. 4 & 1 Will. 4. c. cx	29 May 1830
An Act for more effectually repairing the Road from Carlisle to Penrith, and from Penrith to Eamont Bridge, in the County of Cumberland. (Repealed by Carlisle to Penrith and Penrith to Eamont Bridge Road Act 1859 (22 & 23 Vict. c. xxv))
Newcastle, Limerick and Charleville Road Act 1830 (repealed)	11 Geo. 4 & 1 Will. 4. c. cxi	29 May 1830
An Act for improving and repairing the Road leading from Newcastle, in the County of Limerick, to the City of Limerick, and from thence to Charleville, in the County of Cork. (Repealed by Turnpike Trusts Abolition (Ireland) Act 1857 (20 & 21 Vict. c. 16))
Dundalk and Castle Blayney and Carrickmacross Roads Act 1830 (repealed)	11 Geo. 4 & 1 Will. 4. c. cxii	29 May 1830
An Act for repairing and maintaining the Roads from the Town of Dundalk, in the County of Louth, to the Towns of Castle Blayney and Carrickmacross, in the County of Monaghan. (Repealed by Turnpike Trusts Abolition (Ireland) Act 1857 (20 & 21 Vict. c. 16))
Rickmansworth and Pinner Road Act 1830 (repealed)	11 Geo. 4 & 1 Will. 4. c. cxiii	29 May 1830
An Act for more effectually repairing the Road from the Town of Rickmersworth, in the County of Hertford, through the Village of Pinner, to or near the Swan Publichouse, at Sudbury Common, in the Turnpike Road leading from Harrow to London. (Repealed by Annual Turnpike Acts Continuance Act 1868 (31 & 32 Vict. c. 99))
Bromley (Kent) Road Act 1830	11 Geo. 4 & 1 Will. 4. c. cxiv	29 May 1830
An Act to improve the Road through the Town of Bromley, in the County of Kent.
Queensferry Ferry Improvement Act 1830	11 Geo. 4 & 1 Will. 4. c. cxv	17 June 1830
An Act for the further improvement and support of the Passage across the Frith of Forth, called the Queensferry.
Yeovil Improvement Act 1830 (repealed)	11 Geo. 4 & 1 Will. 4. c. cxvi	17 June 1830
An Act for paving, lighting, watching, watering, cleansing, repairing, widening and otherwise improving the Streets, Lanes, and other public Passages and Places within the Town of Yeovil, in the County of Somerset, and for regulating the Police thereof. (Repealed by Borough of Yeovil Extension Act 1854 (17 & 18 Vict. c. cxxv))
Dover Improvement Act 1830 (repealed)	11 Geo. 4 & 1 Will. 4. c. cxvii	17 June 1830
An Act to amend two Acts (Note: Dover Streets Act 1778 (18 Geo. 3. c. 76)) (Note: Dover Improvement Act 1810 (50 Geo. 3. c. xxvi)) of his late Majesty for paving, cleansing, lighting and watching the Town of Dovor, and for removing and preventing Nuisances and Annoyances therein. (Repealed by County of Kent Act 1981 (c. xviii))
Dublin Improvement Act 1830	11 Geo. 4 & 1 Will. 4. c. cxviii	17 June 1830
An Act to enable the Commissioners of Wide Streets to widen and improve certain Ways, Streets and Passages in and about the City and County of Dublin; and to amend and extend the Provisions of two Acts passed in the forty-seventh and fifty-seventh years of the reign of his late Majesty, for improving and rendering more commodious such parts of the County and County of the City of Dublin, as are situate on the South Side of the River Anna Liffey, and West of His Majesty's Castle of Dublin.
Dundee Harbour Act 1830	11 Geo. 4 & 1 Will. 4. c. cxix	17 June 1830
An Act for more effectually maintaining, improving and extending the Harbour of Dundee, in the County of Forfar.
Courtown Harbour Act 1830	11 Geo. 4 & 1 Will. 4. c. cxx	17 June 1830
An Act to amend an Act passed in the fifth year of the reign of His present Majesty for the completing the Harbour of Courtown, near Brenogue Head, in the County of Wexford.
Perth Harbour and Tay Navigation Act 1830 (repealed)	11 Geo. 4 & 1 Will. 4. c. cxxi	17 June 1830
An Act for enlarging, improving and maintaining the Port and Harbour of Perth, for improving the Navigation of the River Tay to the said City, and for other purposes therewith connected. (Repealed by Perth Burgh and Harbour (No. 2) Act 1856 (19 & 20 Vict. c. cxxxviii))
Galway Harbour Act 1830 (repealed)	11 Geo. 4 & 1 Will. 4. c. cxxii	17 June 1830
An Act for making and maintaining a Navigable Cut or Canal from Lough Corrib to the Bay of Galway, and for the improvement of the Harbour of Galway. (Repealed by Galway Harbour and Port Act 1853 (16 & 17 Vict. c. ccvii))
Glasgow Harbour Act 1830 (repealed)	11 Geo. 4 & 1 Will. 4. c. cxxiii	17 June 1830
An Act for improving the Harbour of Port Glasgow, constructing a Wet Dock or Wet Docks adjacent thereto, and for altering the Road leading from Port Glasgow to Glasgow, near the said Harbour. (Repealed by Port Glasgow Harbour Consolidation Act 1864 (27 & 28 Vict. c. cxl))
Macclesfield Water Act 1830 (repealed)	11 Geo. 4 & 1 Will. 4. c. cxxiv	17 June 1830
An Act for better supplying the Inhabitants of the Borough of Macclesfield, in the County of Chester, with Water, and to establish the Rates payable for the same. (Repealed by Macclesfield Borough Waterworks Act 1849 (12 & 13 Vict. c. xxvi))
Garnkirk and Glasgow Railway Act 1830	11 Geo. 4 & 1 Will. 4. c. cxxv	17 June 1830
An Act for amending certain Acts for making the Glasgow and Garnkirk Railway, and for raising a further sum of Money.
Shannon Navigation Act 1830	11 Geo. 4 & 1 Will. 4. c. cxxvi	17 June 1830
An Act for the improvement of the Shannon Navigation from the City of Limerick to Killaloe, by rebuilding the Bridge called Baal's Bridge, in the said City.
Dartmouth Floating Bridge Act 1830	11 Geo. 4 & 1 Will. 4. c. cxxvii	17 June 1830
An Act for establishing a floating Bridge over the Harbour of Dartmouth, from or near to Lower Sand Quay Point to Old Rock, in the County of Devon; and for building Quays and Landing Places, and for making Roads and Approaches thereto, with Branches therefrom.
Glasgow and Milnford of Garscube Road Act 1830	11 Geo. 4 & 1 Will. 4. c. cxxviii	17 June 1830
An Act for maintaining and repairing the Road leading from the City of Glasgow, through Cowcaddens, to the North End of the Bridge over that part of the River of Kelvin called the Milnford of Garscube, and for making, repairing and maintaining the Road leading from Blackquarry Toll Bar, by Possil, to the Bridge across the River Allander at Langbank, in the Counties of Lanark and Stirling.
Spey and Findhorn Bridges Act 1830	11 Geo. 4 & 1 Will. 4. c. cxxix	17 June 1830
An Act for rebuilding the Bridges over the Rivers Spey and Findhorn, for making Accesses thereto, and for making and maintaining certain new Roads in the County of Elgin.
Ashbourne and Belper Bridge Road Act 1830 (repealed)	11 Geo. 4 & 1 Will. 4. c. cxxx	17 June 1830
An Act for more effectually repairing the Road from Ashborne, in the County of Derby, to a Messuage or Public-house in the occupation of John Frost, near Belpar Bridge, in the said County of Derby. (Repealed by Ashbourne and Belper Turnpike Trust Act 1862 (25 & 26 Vict. c. ciii))
Beverley and Kendell House, and Molescroft and Bainton Balk Roads Act 1830	11 Geo. 4 & 1 Will. 4. c. cxxxi	23 June 1830
An Act for repairing and otherwise improving the Road from Beverley, by Molescroft, to Kendell House, and the Road from Molescroft to Bainton Balk, in the County of York.
St. George Bloomsbury Chapel of Ease Act 1830 (repealed)	11 Geo. 4 & 1 Will. 4. c. cxxxii	16 July 1830
An Act for prohibiting Burying and Funeral Service in a Chapel of Ease, intended to be built for the Parish of Saint George, Bloomsbury, in the County of Middlesex. (Repealed by Christ Church, Woburn Square and St. Matthew, Oakley Square Act 1978 (c. ix))
Bute Ship Canal Act 1830	11 Geo. 4 & 1 Will. 4. c. cxxxiii	16 July 1830
An Act for empowering the Marquis of Bute, to make and maintain a Ship Canal commencing near the mouth of the River Taff, in the County of Glamorgan, and terminating near the Town of Cardiff, with other Works to communicate therewith.
Port Crommelin Harbour Act 1830	11 Geo. 4 & 1 Will. 4. c. cxxxiv	16 July 1830
An Act for establishing and maintaining the Harbour of Port Crommelin, in the Bay of Cushendun, in the County of Antrim.
Rye Harbour Act 1830	11 Geo. 4 & 1 Will. 4. c. cxxxv	16 July 1830
An Act to amend an Act passed in the forty-first year of his late Majesty King George the Third, intituled, "An Act for more effectually improving and maintaining the old Harbour of Rye, in the County of Sussex," (Note: Rye Harbour Act 1801 (41 Geo. 3. (U.K.) c. liii)) and to appoint new Commissioners, and to enable the Commissioners to raise additional Funds on the Tolls by way of Mortgage or otherwise.
Kent and Sussex Drainage Act 1830	11 Geo. 4 & 1 Will. 4. c. cxxxvi	16 July 1830
An Act to amend an Act (Note: Kent and Sussex Marsh Lands Drainage Act 1826 (7 Geo. 4. c. cxxii)) of his late Majesty for more effectually draining and preserving certain Marsh Lands or Low Grounds, in the Parishes of Sandhurst, Newenden, Rolvenden, Tenterden, Wittersham, Ebony, Woodchurch, Appledore and Stone, in the County of Kent, and Ticehurst, Salehurst, Bodiam, Ewhurst, Northiam, Beckly, Peasmarsh, Iden and Playden, in the County of Sussex.
Surrey Coal Trade Act 1830 (repealed)	11 Geo. 4 & 1 Will. 4. c. cxxxvii	16 July 1830
An Act, to continue until the fifth day of July one thousand eight hundred and thirty-one, an Act passed in the ninth year of his late Majesty's reign, (Note: Surrey Coal Trade Act 1828 (9 Geo. 4. c. lxv)) to enable his Majesty's Justices of the Peace for the County of Surrey to nominate and appoint two or more persons to act as principal Land Coal Meters, within and for the several places therein mentioned. (Repealed by Surrey Act 1985 (c. iii))
Glasgow and Kilmarnock Road Act 1830	11 Geo. 4 & 1 Will. 4. c. cxxxviii	16 July 1830
An Act for amending and continuing an Act (Note: Renfrew Roads Act 1825 (6 Geo. 4. c. cviii)) for repairing Roads in the County of Renfrew, and for altering the Line of Road between Glasgow and Kilmarnock in the said County.

=== Private acts ===
Short title	Citation	Royal assent
Long title
Kingston and Iford (Sussex) Inclosure Act 1830	11 Geo. 4 & 1 Will. 4. c. 1 Pr.	23 March 1830
An Act for inclosing Lands in the Parishes of Kingston near Lewes, and Iford, in the County of Sussex.
Forest of Neroche Inclosure Act 1830	11 Geo. 4 & 1 Will. 4. c. 2 Pr.	8 April 1830
An Act for inclosing the Forest of Roach otherwise Roche otherwise Neroach otherwise Neroche, in the Parishes of Broadway, Bickenhall, Beercrocombe, Ilton, Barrington, Ashill, Ilminster, Whitelackington, Curland, Donyatt, Isle-Abbotts, Hatch-Beauchamp, and the Tithing of Domett, in the Parish of Buckland Saint Mary, or some or one of them, in the County of Somerset.
St. Michael-upon-Wyre and Lancaster (Lancashire) Inclosure Act 1830	11 Geo. 4 & 1 Will. 4. c. 3 Pr.	8 April 1830
An Act for dividing and inclosing certain Moss and other Grounds in the Manors and Townships of Out Rawcliffe and Middle Rawcliffe and Stalmine-with-Stainall, in the Parishes of Saint Michael-upon-Wyer and Lancaster, in the County Palatine of Lancaster.
Haddenham Inclosure Act 1830	11 Geo. 4 & 1 Will. 4. c. 4 Pr.	8 April 1830
An Act for inclosing Lands and extinguishing Tithes in the Parish of Haddenham, in the County of Buckingham.
Wistow Inclosure Act 1830	11 Geo. 4 & 1 Will. 4. c. 5 Pr.	3 May 1830
An Act for inclosing Lands in the Parish of Wistow, in the County of Huntingdon, and for extinguishing the Tithes in the said Parish.
Arle and Arlestone in Cheltenham (Gloucestershire) Inclosure Act 1830	11 Geo. 4 & 1 Will. 4. c. 6 Pr.	3 May 1830
An Act for inclosing Lands in the Tithings of Arle and Arlestone otherwise Allstone, in the Parish of Cheltenham, in the County of Gloucester, and for discharging from Tithes Lands in the said Tithings.
Stanley St. Leonards and Eastlington (Gloucestershire) Inclosure Act 1830	11 Geo. 4 & 1 Will. 4. c. 7 Pr.	3 May 1830
An Act for inclosing Lands in the Parishes of Stanley Saint Leonard's otherwise Leonard Stanley and Eastington, or one of them, in the County of Gloucester, and for discharging from Tithes Lands in the said Parish of Stanley Saint Leonard's otherwise Leonard Stanley.
Caxton Inclosure Act 1830	11 Geo. 4 & 1 Will. 4. c. 8 Pr.	29 May 1830
An Act for inclosing, and exonerating from Tithes, Lands in the Parish of Caxton, in the County of Cambridge.
Weston Zoyland and Middle Zoy (Somerset) Inclosure Act 1830	11 Geo. 4 & 1 Will. 4. c. 9 Pr.	29 May 1830
An Act for dividing and allotting Lands within the Parishes of Weston Zoyland and Middlezoy, in the County of Somerset.
Whaddon and Nash (Buckinghamshire) Inclosure Act 1830	11 Geo. 4 & 1 Will. 4. c. 10 Pr.	29 May 1830
An Act for inclosing, and exonerating from Tithes, Lands in the Parish of Whaddon, including the Hamlet of Nash, in the County of Buckingham.
Derrythorpe Inclosure Act 1830	11 Geo. 4 & 1 Will. 4. c. 11 Pr.	29 May 1830
An Act for dividing, allotting and inclosing, and for exonerating from Tithes, Lands within the Township or Hamlet of Deddithorpe otherwise Derrythorpe, in the Parish of Althorpe, in the Isle of Axholme, in the County of Lincoln.
Hagley Inclosure Act 1830	11 Geo. 4 & 1 Will. 4. c. 12 Pr.	29 May 1830
An Act for inclosing certain Lands in the Parish of Hagley, in the County of Worcester.
Blacktoft Inclosure Act 1830	11 Geo. 4 & 1 Will. 4. c. 13 Pr.	29 May 1830
An Act for inclosing Lands in the Townships of Blacktoft, Gilberdike and Faxfleet, in the Parish or Parochial Chapelry of Blacktoft and in the Parishes of Eastrington and South Cave, in the East Riding of the County of York.
Great Strickland and Thrimby (Westmorland) Inclosure Act 1830	11 Geo. 4 & 1 Will. 4. c. 14 Pr.	29 May 1830
An Act for inclosing Lands in the Townships of Great Strickland and Thrimby, in the Parish of Morland, in the County of Westmorland.
Standon Inclosure Act 1830	11 Geo. 4 & 1 Will. 4. c. 15 Pr.	29 May 1830
An Act for inclosing Lands in the Parish of Standon, in the County of Hertford.
Kidwelly, St. Mary Kidwelly, St. Ishmael and Pembrey (Carmarthenshire) Inclosure Act 1830	11 Geo. 4 & 1 Will. 4. c. 16 Pr.	29 May 1830
An Act for inclosing Lands within the several Parishes of Kidwelly, Saint Mary in Kidwelly, Saint Ishmael and Pembrey, in the County of Carmarthen.
Monks Risborough Inclosure Act 1830	11 Geo. 4 & 1 Will. 4. c. 17 Pr.	29 May 1830
An Act for inclosing Lands in the Parish of Monks Risborough, in the County of Buckingham.
Kingsbury Episcopi Inclosure Act 1830	11 Geo. 4 & 1 Will. 4. c. 18 Pr.	29 May 1830
An Act for inclosing Lands in the Parish of Kingsbury Episcopi, in the County of Somerset.
Little Addington Inclosure Act 1830	11 Geo. 4 & 1 Will. 4. c. 19 Pr.	29 May 1830
An Act for inclosing Lands in the Parish of Little Addington, in the County of Northampton.
John Williams's Estate Act 1830	11 Geo. 4 & 1 Will. 4. c. 20 Pr.	29 May 1830
An Act for vesting certain parts of the real Estates devised by the Will of John Williams, Esquire, deceased, in the County of Stafford, in Trustees in trust to carry into execution a Contract entered into for sale thereof, and to apply the Money arising from such Sale in manner therein mentioned.
Dunure Estate Act 1830	11 Geo. 4 & 1 Will. 4. c. 21 Pr.	29 May 1830
An Act to vest a part of the entailed Estate of Dunure, and others, in the County of Ayr, in Trustees in fee simple, for the purpose of disposing of, or applying the Lands so vested, or the Price thereof, or the Securities to be granted thereon, towards satisfying the Debts contracted for Money laid out in the improvement of the said entailed Estate.
Bishop of London's Estate Act 1830	11 Geo. 4 & 1 Will. 4. c. 22 Pr.	29 May 1830
An Act for enabling the Bishop of London to grant Building Leases of certain Estates belonging to the said See.
Budgen's Estate Act 1830	11 Geo. 4 & 1 Will. 4. c. 23 Pr.	29 May 1830
An Act for vesting the legal Estate in certain Estates late of Ann Budgen, formerly vested in Elizabeth Pedder, deceased, in Mortgage, in Edward Rawlings, the present Mortgagee and Trustee of the Equity of Redemption thereof.
Marshall's Marriage Settlement Act 1830	11 Geo. 4 & 1 Will. 4. c. 24 Pr.	29 May 1830
An Act to enable the Trustees under the Marriage Settlement of Bourchier Marshall, Clerk, deceased, and Elizabeth his Wife, also deceased, to effect a Sale of the Advowson of the Church of Bow otherwise Nymet Tracey, in the County of Devon.
Highgate School Act 1830	11 Geo. 4 & 1 Will. 4. c. 25 Pr.	17 June 1830
An Act to enable the Wardens and Governors of the Possessions, Revenues and Goods of the Free Grammar School of Sir Roger Cholmeley, Knight, in Highgate, to pull down their present Chapel, and to contribute towards the erection of a new Chapel or Church in Highgate, and for other purposes.
Browne's Estate Act 1830	11 Geo. 4 & 1 Will. 4. c. 26 Pr.	17 June 1830
An Act for the Re-settlement of certain Interests in the Trust Estate of William Browne, deceased, and for other purposes.
Gordon's Estate Act 1830	11 Geo. 4 & 1 Will. 4. c. 27 Pr.	17 June 1830
An Act for settling the entailed Lands and Estates of Gordonstown, and others, in the County of Elgin and Forres, belonging to Sir William Gordon Gordon Cumming, Baronet, or so much thereof as may be necessary, and to apply the price arising therefrom in the payment of the Debts affecting, or that may be made to affect, the said Lands and Estates.
Campbell's Estate Act 1830	11 Geo. 4 & 1 Will. 4. c. 28 Pr.	17 June 1830
An Act to enable Sir William Purves Hume Campbell, of Marchmont, Baronet, and the Heirs of Entail of the Lands and Barony of Greenlaw, in the County of Ber wick, to grant Feus of parts of the said Lands and Barony.
Poore's Estate Act 1830	11 Geo. 4 & 1 Will. 4. c. 29 Pr.	17 June 1830
An Act for exchanging a fee simple Estate belonging to Edward Dyke Poore, Esquire, situate at Ablington, in the County of Wilts, for an Estate under Settlement, devised by the Will of the late Edward Poore, Esquire, situate at North Tidworth, in the same County, and for authorizing the investment of a sum of Money in the purchase of other Lands, to be settled to the like uses.
Hutton's Estate Act 1830	11 Geo. 4 & 1 Will. 4. c. 30 Pr.	17 June 1830
An Act for vesting the Estates in the County of Lincoln, devised by the Will of Mary Hutton, deceased, in Trustees upon trust, to sell the same, and for laying out the Monies arising from such Sales in the purchase of more convenient Estates, to be settled to the same uses.
Marquis of Hastings's Estate Act 1830	11 Geo. 4 & 1 Will. 4. c. 31 Pr.	17 June 1830
An Act for vesting the settled Estates of the Most honourable George Augustus Francis Rawdon Hastings, Marquis of Hastings, situate in Scotland, in the said Marquis in fee.
Alington's and Rowe's Estates Act 1830	11 Geo. 4 & 1 Will. 4. c. 32 Pr.	17 June 1830
An Act for confirming a Partition made by George Marmaduke Alington, and Samuel Rowe, Esquires, of Estates in the County of Lincoln, devised, in undivided moieties, by the respective Wills of Sarah Rowe and Elizabeth Rowe, deceased.
Franklen's Estate Act 1830	11 Geo. 4 & 1 Will. 4. c. 33 Pr.	17 June 1830
An Act for carrying into effect a Contract entered into for the sale of certain Freehold and Leasehold Estates in the Parishes of Merthyr Maur, Saint Brides Major and Coitee, in the County of Glamorgan, the Estate of Richard Franklen, Esquire, to the Right honourable Sir John Nicholl, Knight, and for applying the Money thence arising in the purchase of other Estates, to be settled to the same uses as the Estates sold.
Gordon's Estate Act 1830	11 Geo. 4 & 1 Will. 4. c. 34 Pr.	17 June 1830
An Act for vesting part of the Estates devised by and settled to the uses of the Wills of James Gordon, Esquire, and of his Son James Gordon, Esquire, both deceased, situate in the Counties of Hertford and Somerset, and in the Island of Antigua, in the West Indies, in Trustees, to be sold, and for laying out the Monies thence arising in the purchase of other Estates, and for other purposes.
Duke of Argyll's Estate Act 1830	11 Geo. 4 & 1 Will. 4. c. 35 Pr.	17 June 1830
An Act for empowering George William Duke of Argyll, and his Trustee, to borrow a sum of Money, and to make it a charge on the Estate of Argyll, upon certain conditions.
Hawkins' Estate Act 1830	11 Geo. 4 & 1 Will. 4. c. 36 Pr.	23 June 1830
An Act for authorizing Leases to be granted of such of the Estates, in the County of Cornwall, as were devised by the Will of Sir Christopher Hawkins, Baronet, deceased, to Christopher Henry Thomas Hawkins, an Infant, during his life.
Evelyn's Estate Act 1830	11 Geo. 4 & 1 Will. 4. c. 37 Pr.	23 June 1830
An Act for authorizing the granting of building and other Leases of Freehold Ground and Hereditaments, late the property of Dame Mary Evelyn, deceased, in the Parishes of Saint Paul and Saint Nicholas, Deptford, in the County of Kent.
Pole's Estate Act 1830	11 Geo. 4 & 1 Will. 4. c. 38 Pr.	23 June 1830
An Act for renewing, granting and confirming certain Powers and Authorities to Sir Peter Pole, Baronet, given or limited by the Will of Sir Charles Pole, Baronet, deceased, and an Indenture of Release affecting his Estates in the County of Southampton.
Duke of Buccleuch and Queensberry's Estate Act 1830	11 Geo. 4 & 1 Will. 4. c. 39 Pr.	23 June 1830
An Act for exchanging the Estates in the County of Northampton, of which the Most noble Walter Francis Douglas Montagu, Duke of Buccleuch and Queensberry, is tenant in tail, under the Will of the Most noble John, late Duke of Montagu, deceased, for some of his settled Estates in the Counties of Lancaster and York, of which he is tenant for life, under the Will of the Most noble Elizabeth, late Duchess of Buccleuch and Queensberry, deceased.
Benson's Estate Act 1830	11 Geo. 4 & 1 Will. 4. c. 40 Pr.	16 July 1830
An Act for vesting an Estate at Liverpool, in the County of Lancaster, devised and settled by the Will of Moses Benson, Esquire, deceased, in Trustees, to be sold, and for laying out the Monies arising from such sale in the purchase of Estates to be settled to the same uses.
Warriner's Estate Act 1830	11 Geo. 4 & 1 Will. 4. c. 41 Pr.	16 July 1830
An Act for vesting Estates, of which Gifford Warriner, Esquire, a Lunatic, is tenant in tail, in Trustees, for sale; and also for effecting a Partition of certain parts thereof, and for granting Leases.
Lord Cremorne's Estate Act 1830	11 Geo. 4 & 1 Will. 4. c. 42 Pr.	16 July 1830
An Act to enable the Guardian of the Right honourable Richard Lord Cremorne, an Infant, to carry into effect a Contract entered into for the purchase of Rockcorry Castle, and adjoining Lands, in the County of Monaghan, in Ireland.
Hall's Estate Act 1830	11 Geo. 4 & 1 Will. 4. c. 43 Pr.	16 July 1830
An Act to authorize the granting of Mining and Building Leases of certain parts of the Estates subject to the Trusts of the Will of Benjamin Hall, Esquire, deceased.
Stoke Newington Prebend Act 1830	11 Geo. 4 & 1 Will. 4. c. 44 Pr.	16 July 1830
An Act to authorize the granting of Leases of Lands, parcel of the prebend of Stoke Newton or Newnton, otherwise Newington, in the County of Middlesex, founded in the Cathedral Church of Saint Paul, in London, to the Governor and Company of the New River brought from Chadwell and Amwell to London, and for empowering the Prebendary of the said Prebend, and the Rector of the Rectory or Parsonage of Stoke Newington respectively, to grant Building Leases, and for other purposes.
Buckle's Estate Act 1830	11 Geo. 4 & 1 Will. 4. c. 45 Pr.	16 July 1830
An Act to enable John Buckle, Esquire, or other Committee of the Estate of William Buckle, a Lunatic, for and in the name and on behalf of the said William Buckle, to consent to the exercise of a Power of Sale over Estates settled on the said William Buckle for his life, and which Power is exerciseable with the consent of the said William Buckle.
Mount Sandford's Estate Act 1830	11 Geo. 4 & 1 Will. 4. c. 46 Pr.	16 July 1830
An Act to enable the Devisees under the last Will and Testament of the Right honourable Henry Lord Mount Sandford, deceased, to make Leases of the Lands, Tenements and Hereditaments, lately in the possession of the said Henry Lord Mount Sandford, and devised by his said Will, and also to enable the said Devisees to execute a conveyance to the Rector of Kilkevan, of a certain piece of Ground situate in the Parish of Kilkevan, and County of Roscommon.
Gwyn's Estate Act 1830	11 Geo. 4 & 1 Will. 4. c. 47 Pr.	16 July 1830
An Act for establishing and carrying into execution the Trusts created by the last Will and Testament of John Gwyn, late of the City of Londonderry, merchant, deceased, and for incorporating the Trustees therein named, and for other purposes.
Roan's Charity Act 1830	11 Geo. 4 & 1 Will. 4. c. 48 Pr.	16 July 1830
An Act for the Improvement of the Town of Greenwich, in the County of Kent, and for the better Regulation of Roan's Charity there.
Meltham Inclosure (Amendment) Act 1830	11 Geo. 4 & 1 Will. 4. c. 49 Pr.	16 July 1830
An Act to amend an Act of King George the Third, intituled, "An Act for inclosing Lands in the Manor of Meltham, in the Parish of Almondbury, in the West Riding of the County of York." (Note: Meltham Inclosure Act 1817 (57 Geo. 3. c. 10 Pr.))
William Russell's and Marquess and Marchioness of Londonderry's Estates Act 1830	11 Geo. 4 & 1 Will. 4. c. 50 Pr.	23 July 1830
An Act to effect an exchange of part of the Estates, in the County of Durham, devised by the Will and Codicil of William Russell, Esquire, deceased, for part of the Estates comprized in the settlement made in pursuance of the articles upon the Marriage of the Most honorable Charles William Vane, Marquess of Londonderry, with the Most honorable Frances Anne Vane, Marchioness of Londonderry.
Baron Ellenborough's Divorce Act 1830 (Note: This act was not printed by the King's Printer)	11 Geo. 4 & 1 Will. 4. c. 51 Pr.	8 April 1830
An Act to dissolve the Marriage of the Right honourable Edward Baron Ellenborough with the Right honourable Jane Elizabeth Baroness Ellenborough his now Wife, and to enable him to marry again, and for other purposes therein mentioned.
Fructuozo's Naturalization Act 1830	11 Geo. 4 & 1 Will. 4. c. 52 Pr.	8 April 1830
An Act for naturalizing John Anthony Fructuozo.
Muskett's Divorce Act 1830	11 Geo. 4 & 1 Will. 4. c. 53 Pr.	3 May 1830
An Act to dissolve the Marriage of Joseph Salisbury Muskett, Esquire, with Mary Muskett, his now Wife, and to enable him to marry again, and for other purposes.
Charminster Inclosure Act 1830	11 Geo. 4 & 1 Will. 4. c. 54 Pr.	29 May 1830
An Act for inclosing Lands within the Parish of Charminster, in the County of Dorset.
D'Oyly's Divorce Act 1830	11 Geo. 4 & 1 Will. 4. c. 55 Pr.	29 May 1830
An Act to dissolve the Marriage of John Hadley D'Oyly, Esquire, with Charlotte, his now Wife, and to enable him to marry again, and for other purposes.
Wallis's Divorce Act 1830	11 Geo. 4 & 1 Will. 4. c. 56 Pr.	29 May 1830
An Act to dissolve the Marriage of Thomas Wallis, Esquire, with Charlotte Augusta Amelia, his now Wife, and to enable him to marry again, and for other purposes.
De Chapeaurouge's Naturalization Act 1830	11 Geo. 4 & 1 Will. 4. c. 57 Pr.	29 May 1830
An Act for naturalizing Philip Augustus De Chapeaurouge.
Welsh Iron and Coal Mining Company (Dissolution) Act 1830	11 Geo. 4 & 1 Will. 4. c. 58 Pr.	17 June 1830
An Act for dissolving a certain Partnership Company known by the name of The Welsh Iron and Coal-Mining Company, and for enabling the Directors and Trustees thereof to dispose of the Estate and Effects of the Concern, and divide the surplus, after payment of Debts and Expenses, amongst the Shareholders of the Capital Stock therein, and for other purposes.
Shakerley's Divorce Act 1830	11 Geo. 4 & 1 Will. 4. c. 59 Pr.	17 June 1830
An Act to dissolve the Marriage of Charles Peter Shakerley, Esquire, of the Parish of Egham, in the County of Surrey, with Laure Angelique Rosalbe Shakerley his now Wife, and to enable him to marry again, and for other purposes therein mentioned.
Hamerton's Divorce Act 1830	11 Geo. 4 & 1 Will. 4. c. 60 Pr.	17 June 1830
An Act to dissolve the Marriage of William Medows Hamerton, Esquire, with Isabella Frances his now Wife, and to enable him to marry again, and for other purposes.
Humbert's Naturalization Act 1830	11 Geo. 4 & 1 Will. 4. c. 61 Pr.	17 June 1830
An Act for naturalizing Francis Joseph Humbert.
Boydell's Divorce Act 1830	11 Geo. 4 & 1 Will. 4. c. 62 Pr.	16 July 1830
An Act to dissolve the Marriage of Samuel Boydell with Jane Boydell Boydell his now Wife, and to enable him to marry again, and for other purposes.
Mildmay's Divorce Act 1830	11 Geo. 4 & 1 Will. 4. c. 63 Pr.	16 July 1830
An Act to dissolve the Marriage of Captain Edward Saint John Mildmay, with Marianne Catherine, his now Wife, and to enable him to marry again, and for other purposes therein mentioned.
Bayley's Divorce Act 1830	11 Geo. 4 & 1 Will. 4. c. 64 Pr.	16 July 1830
An Act to dissolve the Marriage of James Bayley, Esquire, with Louisa, his Wife, and to enable him to marry again, and for other purposes.
George Smith's Naturalization Act 1830	11 Geo. 4 & 1 Will. 4. c. 65 Pr.	16 July 1830
An Act for naturalizing George Smith.
John Smith's Naturalization Act 1830	11 Geo. 4 & 1 Will. 4. c. 66 Pr.	16 July 1830
An Act for naturalizing John Christopher Smith.

=== Sources ===
- 11 George IV and 1 William IV - 1830 – via Internet Archive.
- The Statutes of the United Kingdom of Great Britain and Ireland. 11 Geo. IV & 1 Will. IV. 1830 – via Google Books.
- 11 George IV and 1 William IV - 1830 – via Internet Archive.
- Journal of the House of Commons. Vol. 85. London: His Majesty's Stationery Office. pp. 3–658 – via British History Online.
- Chronological Table of and Index to the Statutes. Vol. 1: To the End of the Session 59 Vict. Sess. 2 (1895) (13th ed.). London: Her Majesty's Stationery Office. 1896. pp. 257–260 – via Google Books.

== 1 Will. 4 ==
The 9th Parliament of the United Kingdom, which met from 26 October 1830 until 22 April 1831.

This session was also traditionally cited as 1 Gul. 4, 1 Wm. 4 or 1 W. 4.

=== Public general acts ===
Short title	Citation	Royal assent
Long title
Supply Act 1830 (repealed)	1 Will. 4. c. 1	10 December 1830
An Act to apply the Sum of Three Millions out of the Consolidated Fund to the Service of the Year One thousand eight hundred and thirty. (Repealed by Statute Law Revision Act 1874 (37 & 38 Vict. c. 35))
Regency Act 1830 (repealed)	1 Will. 4. c. 2	23 December 1830
An Act to provide for the Administration of the Government in case the Crown should descend to Her Royal Highness the Princess Alexandrina Victoria, Daughter of His late Royal Highness the Duke of Kent, being under the Age of Eighteen Years, and for the Care and Guardianship of Her Person. (Repealed by Statute Law Revision Act 1874 (37 & 38 Vict. c. 35))
Law Terms (Explanation) Act 1830 (repealed)	1 Will. 4. c. 3	23 December 1830
An Act to amend an Act of the last Session, (Note: Law Terms Act 1830 (11 Geo. 4 & 1 Will. 4. c. 70)) for the better Administration of Justice, so far as relates to the Essoign and General Return Days of each Term, and to substitute other Provisions in lieu thereof; and to declare the Law with regard to the Duration of the Terms in certain Cases. (Repealed by Supreme Court of Judicature (Consolidation) Act 1925 (15 & 16 Geo. 5. c. 49))
Colonial Offices Act 1830 (repealed)	1 Will. 4. c. 4	23 December 1830
An Act to render valid Acts done by the Governor of any of His Majesty's Plantations after the Expiration of his Commission by the Demise of His late Majesty, and to extend the Period within which the Patents of Governors of Colonies shall on any future Demise of the Crown become vacant, and to provide for the longer Duration of the Patents of Governors after the Demise of the Crown. (Repealed by Statute Law (Repeals) Act 1973 (c. 39))
Appropriation Act 1830 (repealed)	1 Will. 4. c. 5	23 December 1830
An Act to apply the Sum of One million eight hundred and fifty thousand Pounds out of the Consolidated Fund to the Service of the Year One thousand eight hundred and thirty; and to appropriate the Supplies granted in this Session of Parliament. (Repealed by Statute Law Revision Act 1874 (37 & 38 Vict. c. 35))
Commissions, etc., Continuance Act 1830 (repealed)	1 Will. 4. c. 6	23 December 1830
An Act to continue for the Term of Six Calendar Months all such Commissions, Appointments, Grants, or Patents of Offices or Employments, Civil or Military, as were in force at the Time of the Demise of His late Majesty King George the Fourth, and as have not been superseded, determined, or made void during the Reign of His present Majes (Repealed by Statute Law Revision Act 1874 (37 & 38 Vict. c. 35))

=== Local acts ===
Short title	Citation	Royal assent
Long title
Highgate, Chipping Barnet and South Mimms Roads Act 1830	1 Will. 4. c. i	23 December 1830
An Act for more effectually repairing and otherwise improving the Road from Highgate in the County of Middlesex, through Whetstone, to Chipping Barnet in the County of Hertford, and the Road from Chipping Barnet to the Thirteen Mile Stone near Gannick Corner in the Parish of South Mims in the said County of Middlesex.
Marchwiel and Whitchurch (Salop.), Bangor and Malpas, and Redbrook and Hampton Roads Act 1830	1 Will. 4. c. ii	23 December 1830
An Act for repairing, amending, and maintaining the Roads from Marchwiel, through Bangor, Worthenbury, and Hanmer, to Whitchurch, and from Bangor to Malpas, and from Redbrook to Hampton, in the Counties of Denbigh, Flint, Chester, and Salop.

=== Private acts ===
Short title	Citation	Royal assent
Long title
Piddlehinton Inclosure Act 1830	1 Will. 4. c. 1 Pr.	23 December 1830
An Act for dividing, allotting, and inclosing Lands within the Parish of Piddlehinton in the County of Dorset.

=== Sources ===
- The Statutes of the United Kingdom of Great Britain and Ireland, 1 William IV. 1831. London. 1831 – via Internet Archive.
- The Statutes of the United Kingdom of Great Britain and Ireland, 1 William IV. 1831. London. 1831 – via Google Books.
- Journal of the House of Commons. Vol. 86. London: His Majesty's Stationery Office. pp. 5–518.

== See also ==
- List of acts of the Parliament of the United Kingdom
