= Plaint number =

A plaint number is "an old-fashioned term for a claim number".

It was formerly used in the British court system. The term continues to be used in Australia, and searches for court records in Australian use the plaint number.

Claims under administrative law for medical malpractice or other professional misconduct may also use a plaint number.

== See also ==
- Allocation questionnaire
- Docket
- Lawsuit
- Mental health courts
