= Contingent liability =

Financial losses that an entity might incur from an uncertain future event

In accounting, contingent liabilities are liabilities that may be incurred by an entity depending on the outcome of an uncertain future event such as the outcome of a pending lawsuit. These liabilities are not recorded in a company's accounts and shown in the balance sheet when both probable and reasonably estimable as 'contingency' or 'worst case' financial outcome. A footnote to the balance sheet may describe the nature and extent of the contingent liabilities. The likelihood of loss is described as probable, reasonably possible, or remote. The ability to estimate a loss is described as known, reasonably estimable, or not reasonably estimable. It may or may not occur.

== Classification ==
According to International Monetary Fund's Government Finance Statistics Manual, contingent liabilities shall be classified as:

- Explicit contingent liabilities
  - Guarantees
    - One-off guarantees
      - Loan and other debt instrument guarantees (publicly guaranteed debt)
      - Other one-off guarantees
  - Other explicit contingent liabilities
- Implicit contingent liabilities
  - Net implicit obligations for future social security benefits
  - Other implicit contingent liabilities

== Examples ==
- Outstanding lawsuits
- Claims against the company not acknowledged as debts
- Legal liability
- Liquidated damages
- Tort
- Unliquidated damages
- Destruction by Flood
- product warranty
- Income Tax Disputed
- Sales Tax Disputed
- Financial guarantees given
