= In open court =

Legal terminology

In open court is a legal term in the United States defined by the appearance by a party or their attorney in a public court session such as during a public trial. Normally, the public may be present at trials, hearings and similar routine matters.

== United States constitutional law ==
Under Article III, Section 3 of the United States Constitution:

No Person shall be convicted of Treason unless on the Testimony of two Witnesses to the same overt Act, or on Confession in open Court

— U.S. Const., Art. III, § 3 (emphasis added).

In the United States, the constitution guarantees criminal defendants the right to a "speedy and public trial" under the Sixth and the Fourteenth Amendments. The Sixth Amendment also grants the defendant the right to appear on his or her own behalf requiring leave of the Court in complex criminal cases, and standby counsel may still be required by the judge.

== Distinguishing rules ==
Many courts dealing with minors, such as the New York Surrogate's Court, Probate Court, Family court, juvenile court, or widow's and orphan's court do not normally hold sessions in open court.

Appearance in open court is distinguished from an appearance in a judge's chambers.

== See also ==
- Admission
- Jurisdiction
- Open court principle
- Settlement conference
