= Corporate appointeeship =

Corporate appointeeship is the name given in the United Kingdom (UK) to the process of an accredited organisation becoming the designated appointee to a person who is unable to manage their finances. Corporate appointees are often Local government or local authorities in the UK and firms of solicitors or consumer advocate organisations that provide an appointeeship service when a suitable family member or friend is unavailable or lacking to take over the daily money management services and responsibilities of the person in need of an appointee.

A county council or similar authority will be appointed under certain circumstances:

The Corporate Appointee will administer your finances on your behalf if you:

- Lack capacity to manage your own finances and/or are physically disabled
- Your income consists of benefits and you have no other major assets or income
- There is no other close family member or friend willing to take on this role.

Due to the lack of resources that local authorities have in the UK and the fact that money management services are not statutory services, many councils now outsource corporate appointeeship to organisations across the England.

Corporate appointees need to be approved by the Department for Work and Pensions, as the appointee is responsible for receiving benefit entitlement payments on behalf of the individual representing. Corporate appointee services have been extended by Daily Money Management companies across the UK which has served to highlight the lack of financial protection that often leads to the financial abuse of vulnerable individuals unable to manage their finances.

== Procedure ==
The procedure for appointing such a corporate entity to handle a person's finances is complicated and can be contested; the process must be followed carefully, and while retaining a private attorney is not always necessary, at a minimum, a social worker should be contacted. After a social worker completes a care assessment, they can recommend a Corporate Appointee.

If a county or borough council takes on the application, then they complete the "forms for the Department for Work and Pensions (DWP), [and] notify the DWP...."

== See also ==
- Allocation questionnaire, a similar legal form process in the UK
- Conservator of a Conservatorship, in the United States, a person appointed by a court or regulatory authority to supervise a person or entity's financial affairs
- Conservator (religion), a judge appointed by the Pope to protect the personae miserabiles
- Public administrator, as similar position in the United States, but for decedent's estates
