= Liquidated damages =

Damages agreed for a delay in a contract

Liquidated damages, also referred to as liquidated and ascertained damages (LADs), are damages whose amount the parties designate during the formation of a contract for the injured party to collect as compensation upon a specific breach (e.g., late performance). This is most applicable where the damages are intangible.

An average of the likely costs which may be incurred in dealing with a breach may be used. Authority for the proposition that averaging is the appropriate approach may be taken from the case of English Hop Growers v Dering, 2 KB 174, CA (1928).

Damages which are not certain or depend on unresolved contigencies may be referred to as unliquidated damages, and when damages are not predetermined/assessed in advance, then the amount recoverable is said to be "at large" (to be agreed or determined by a court or tribunal in the event of breach).

The purpose of a liquidated damages clause is to increase certainty and avoid the legal costs of determining actual damages later if the contract is breached. Thus, they are most appropriate when (a) the parties can agree in advance on reasonable compensation for breach, but (b) the court would have a difficult time determining fair compensation at the time of breach. Under the common law, liquidated damages may not be set so high that they are penalty clauses rather than fair compensation.

== Common law ==
Generally, at common law, a liquidated damages clause will not be enforced if its purpose is to punish the party in breach rather than to compensate the injured party, in which case it is referred to as a penal or penalty clause. One reason for this is that the enforcement of the term would, in effect, require an equitable order of specific performance. However, courts sitting in equity will seek to achieve a fair result and will not enforce a term that will lead to the unjust enrichment of the enforcing party.

For a liquidated damages clause to be upheld, two conditions must be met.

1. The amount of the damages identified must roughly approximate the damages likely to fall upon the party seeking the benefit of the term as assessed at the time when the agreement of contract was entered into.
2. The damages must be sufficiently uncertain at the time the contract is made that such a clause will likely save both parties the future difficulty of estimating damages.

Damages which are sufficiently uncertain may be referred to as unliquidated damages, and may be so categorized because they are not mathematically calculable or are subject to a contingency.

Contracts in the NEC3 family use the term 'low service damages' (optional clause X.17) and generally include a Low Service Damages Schedule.

Contracts under common law require there to have been some attempt to create an equal or reasonably proportionate quota between the damages made and the actual loss. Parties must not lose sight of the principal compensation and they must keep the time of execution and the difficulty of the calculations in mind when drafting the contract.

Example

Anna Abbot agrees to lease a store-front to Bob Benson, from which Benson intends to sell jewellery. If Abbot breaches the contract by refusing to lease the store-front at the appointed time, it will be difficult to determine what profits Benson will have lost because the success of newly created small businesses is highly uncertain. This, therefore, would be an appropriate circumstance for Benson to insist upon a liquidated damages clause in case Abbot fails to perform.

=== The definition and scope extended ===
In Australia, the definition of liquidated damages applies to the situations where upon the failure of a primary stipulation, imposes a detriment to the first party or a benefit to the second party by a secondary stipulation collateral to the primary stipulation (i.e. it does not have to be a breach).

=== Uniform Commercial Code ===
In the United States, Section 2-718(1) of the Uniform Commercial Code provides that, in contracts for the sale of goods:

Damages for breach by either party may be liquidated in the agreement but only at an amount which is reasonable in the light of the anticipated or actual harm caused by the breach, the difficulties of proof of loss, and the inconvenience or nonfeasibility of otherwise obtaining an adequate remedy. A term fixing unreasonably large liquidated damages is void as a penalty.

This largely mirrors the common law rule, which applies to other types of contracts under the law of most US states.

=== Case law ===
In the case of construction contracts, courts have occasionally refused to enforce liquidated damages provisions, choosing to follow the doctrine of concurrent delay when both parties have contributed to the overall delay of the project.

In the 2015 case of Unaoil Ltd v Leighton Offshore PTE Ltd., a Memorandum of Understanding (MoU) between the two parties detailed plans for Leighton to sub-contract work to Unaoil if they won a bid for a construction and engineering contract. The MoU included an agreement on liquidated damages. The MoU was amended on two occasions after it had been agreed, including an amendment to the amount to be paid to Unaoil. The High Court found that although the liquidated damages clause may have been based on a genuine pre-estimate of loss at the time the MoU was agreed, it had not been reviewed or amended at the times when the agreement was amended and therefore was unenforceable. The ruling means that when a contract is being amended, particularly if the amendment is relevant to the value of the contract, any liquidated damages clauses should be reviewed and amended if necessary.

In Australia, questions regarding the interaction between liquidated damages clauses and claims for actual damages have arisen in construction disputes. In Cappello v Hammond & Simonds NSW Pty Ltd [2020] NSWSC 1021, the Supreme Court of New South Wales considered whether a nominal liquidated damages provision of $1 per day prevented an owner from recovering actual losses arising from delay.

Historically, the English courts would not allow claims for liquidated damages to be set off against claims based on unliquidated damages, but case law following Hanak v. Green [1958] 2 QB 9 has established equitable principles which allow for set-off in such circumstances.

=== The law applied to bank and credit card charges ===
==== United Kingdom ====
UK bank and credit card customers were being charged as much as £39 for a single transaction taking them over their credit limit. Consumers argued these charges were well beyond the cost of sending a computerised letter.

In 2007 the Office of Fair Trading investigated the charges being imposed on customers of credit card companies. In its report, the OFT claimed these charges were unlawful under UK law as they amounted to a penalty. It said it would be prepared to investigate any charge over £12, though this was not intended to indicate that £12 is a fair and acceptable charge. The OFT said it would be up to a court to determine such an amount based on the established legal precedent that the only recoverable cost would be actual costs incurred.

The credit card companies did not produce evidence of their actual costs to the OFT, instead insisting their charges are in line with clear policy and information provided to customers.

Receipt of liquidated damages and intimately linked with the purpose of the profit-making apparatus, is a capital receipt. The amount received by the assessee towards compensation for sterilization of the profit earning source is not in the ordinary course of business. Hence, it is a capital receipt in the hands of the assessee.

In 2009 the Supreme Court ruled (see Office of Fair Trading v Abbey National plc) that terms in bank account contracts were not capable of being penal, bar those applicable to NatWest Bank customers between 2001 and 2003. The court ruled that the charges were a charge for a service, and not a penalty for damages for breaching a contract term.

==== Australia ====
In 2012, the High Court of Australia allowed an appeal against findings of the Federal Court of Australia that 'exception fees' imposed by the ANZ Bank could not constitute an unenforceable penalty. The High Court found that fees were not incapable of being characterised as penalties merely because they were not charged upon breach of contract.

Conversely, in 2014, the federal court (Gordon J) described $35 late payment fees by ANZ Banking Group to customers who failed to make their monthly minimum credit card repayment as being “extravagant, exorbitant and unconscionable” and ordered for these fees to be reimbursed. ANZ appealed.

In 2015, the full court overturned Justice Gordon's first instance judgment that credit card late payment fees charged by ANZ to its customers constituted penalties at law and equity (and were therefore largely unenforceable). The decision otherwise upholds Justice Gordon's findings that honour, dishonour and overlimit fees charged by ANZ were not penalties, unconscionable or unfair. While the decision is very fact specific, it represented a major setback for other class actions based on penalties. Paciocco appealed to the High Court.

The last chapter of the bank fees saga took place in July 2016 where the High Court dismissed the appeal for leave and held that the full court was correct to characterise the loss provision costs, regulatory capital costs and collection costs as affecting the legitimate interests of the Bank. The Court asserted that the fact that those categories of costs could not be recovered in an action for damages did not alter that conclusion. Further, neither the fact that the late payment fees were not genuine pre-estimates of damage nor the fact that the amounts charged were disproportionate to the actual loss suffered by itself rendered the late payment fees penalties. High Court

== Other legal systems ==
=== Civil law ===
Civil law systems generally impose less severe restrictions on liquidated damages. For example, Article 1226 of the French Civil Code provides for clause pénale, a variant of liquidated damages which combines compensatory and coercive elements. Judges may adjust excessive contract penalties, but such clauses are not generally void as a matter of French law.

Article 420-1 of the Civil Code of Japan provides an even firmer basis to uphold contractual penalties:

1. The parties may agree on the amount of the liquidated damages with respect to the failure to perform the obligation. In such case, the court may not increase or decrease the amount thereof.
2. The liquidated damages shall not preclude the demand for performance or the exercise of the cancellation right.
3. Any penalty is presumed to constitute liquidated damages.

In the U.S. state of Louisiana, which follows a civil law system, liquidated damages are referred to as "stipulated damages". Prior to 1 January 1985, Louisiana law used the term “penal clause” under former article 2117 of the Civil Code. Stipulated damages create a secondary obligation for the purpose of enforcing the principal obligation. The aggrieved party may demand either the stipulated damages or performance of the principal obligation, but may not demand both except for delay. Stipulated damages may not be modified by the court (and will therefore be enforced) "unless they are so manifestly unreasonable as to be contrary to public policy".

=== Islamic law ===
Islamic law prohibits gharar (uncertainty) in contracts, and liquidated damages provisions are a favored mechanism to overcome uncertainty regarding contractual damages.

== Insurance ==
It is possible to arrange insurance cover to provide payment in the event that liquidated damages become due.

== See also ==
- Penalty clause
- Penalties in English law
- Punitive Damages

== See also ==
Cavendish Square Holding BV v Talal El Makdessi [2015] UKSC 67, Supreme Court (UK)

- Unspecified claim
- Penal bond
