= Doctrine of concurrent delay =

Contract law theory

The doctrine of concurrent delay is a contract law theory used to eliminate delay damages, under the premise that where both parties to the contract caused delays to the overall project, neither party can recover damages for that period of time when both parties were at fault.
