= Unspecified claim =

An unspecified claim is a tort claim "where the amount to be awarded is left to the Court to determine."

Examples of unspecified claims are unspecified damages for personal injuries, such as from a motor vehicle accident (MVA) or medical malpractice.

Unspecified claim was previously known in the common law, especially in England and Wales and Pakistan, as an unliquidated claim.

In United Kingdom tax law, an unspecified claim is also any unspecified tax liability.

Under New York civil practice, "stating a specific sum in (a) personal injury complaint" is normally barred. Technically, it is not strictly prohibited, but it prevents adding additional damages to jury instructions. However, under a recent New York Court of Appeals case, stating a specific sum is mandatory in Court of claims practice, so an unspecified claim "can lead to the loss of the claimant's whole case". Federal judge Walter Rivera used this reasoning when ruling in a parallel case in court filing found on nycourts.gov; “The failure to bring a late claim application before the expiration of the relevant statute of limitations would preclude the Court from considering the application because the failure to file a late claim application within the proscribed time period is a jurisdictional defect and the Court is without discretionary power to grant nunc pro tunc relief".

== See also ==
- Liquidated damages
- Valid claim
