= South Wales Turnpike Trusts Act 1844 =

Act of the Parliament of the United Kingdom

South Wales Turnpike Trusts Act 1844 (Note: This short title was conferred on this act by section 1 of the South Wales Turnpike Roads Amendment Act 1882 (45 & 46 Vict. c. 67).)
- Act of Parliament
- Parliament of the United Kingdom
- Long title: An Act to consolidate and amend the Laws relating to Turnpike Trusts in South Wales.
- Citation: 7 & 8 Vict. c. 91
- Territorial extent: Wales (Note: Section 2.)

Dates
- Royal assent: 9 August 1844
- Commencement: 9 August 1844 (Note: The Acts of Parliament (Commencement) Act 1793.)
- Repealed: 5 November 1993
Other legislation
Amends	See § Repealed enactments
Repeals/revokes	See § Repealed enactments
Amended by	Turnpike Trusts (South Wales) Act 1845; South Wales Turnpike Roads Act 1847; Statute Law Revision Act 1874 (No. 2); Statute Law Revision Act 1878; South Wales Turnpike Roads Amendment Act 1882
Repealed by	Statute Law (Repeals) Act 1993

Status: Repealed

Text of statute as originally enacted

The South Wales Turnpike Trusts Act 1844 (7 & 8 Vict. c. 91) was an act of the Parliament of the United Kingdom that consolidated enactments related to turnpike trusts in South Wales.

== Background ==
From the late 1830s, farmers and agricultural labourers in west and mid Wales carried out a sustained campaign of attacks on turnpike toll-gates, known as the Rebecca Riots, in protest at the multiplicity of tolls levied by the numerous small turnpike trusts then operating in the region and at the wider burden of rents, tithes and rates falling on tenant farmers during a period of agricultural depression.

In response, Her Majesty issued a Commission on 7 October 1843 directing the Commissioners to inquire into the state of the laws administered in South Wales regulating the maintenance and repair of turnpike roads, highways and bridges. The Commissioners reported on 6 March 1844, recommending that the debts then chargeable upon the several turnpike trusts in South Wales should be ascertained and redeemed, that the numerous separate trusts in each county should be consolidated and placed under uniform management, and that the laws relating to the collection and application of tolls should be revised and amended.

== Provisions ==
=== Repealed enactments ===
Sections 65 and 66 of the act repealed part of 2 enactments, listed in those sections, as far as they related to the counties of Glamorgan, Brecknock, Radnor, Carmarthen, Pembroke and Cardigan.

Citation	Short title	Description	Extent of repeal
3 Geo. 4. c. 126	Turnpike Roads Act 1822	An Act to amend the general Laws now in being for regulating Turnpike Roads in that Part of Great Britain called England.	So much of the act as required the Trustees or Commissioners of every turnpike road to examine, audit and settle the accounts of their Treasurers, Clerks and Surveyors at the general annual meeting, and to transmit a statement of the debts, revenues and expenditure of the trust to the Clerk of the Peace, as far as it related to the said counties.
3 & 4 Will. 4. c. 80	Turnpike Trusts Returns Act 1833	An Act requiring the annual Statements of Trustees or Commissioners of Turnpike Roads to be transmitted to the Secretary of State, and afterwards laid before Parliament.	So much of the act as required the Clerks to Trustees or Commissioners to transmit copies of the annual statements to a Secretary of State, and as fixed the day for holding the general annual meeting, as far as it related to the said counties.

== Subsequent developments ==
The act was amended by the Turnpike Trusts (South Wales) Act 1845 (8 & 9 Vict. c. 61), which made further provision for the consolidation of turnpike trusts in South Wales, and by the South Wales Turnpike Roads Act 1847 (10 & 11 Vict. c. 72), which further amended the laws relating to turnpike roads in South Wales. The act was later amended by the South Wales Turnpike Roads Amendment Act 1882 (45 & 46 Vict. c. 67), section 1 of which conferred on the act its short title.

The whole act was repealed by section 1(1) of, and part XV of schedule 1 to, the Statute Law (Repeals) Act 1993, which came into force on 5 November 1993.
