= Allocation questionnaire =

An allocation questionnaire is a form used in English legal practice. After a claim is made, if a defence is filed each party is required to complete and return an allocation questionnaire to the court so that the judge may properly allocate the claim to a track and give further directions towards a final hearing.

== Forms on the Internet ==
Sample allocation questionnaires are available on the Internet. The official UK Courts web site has many forms available, including the allocation questionnaire. The actual form is available, as of March 2007, as a pdf file.

The Citizens Advice Bureau provides a generic legal advice web site with information about the words and phrases used in small claims procedure in UK Courts.

== The form itself ==
The allocation questionnaire is a Pivotal Point in the judicial process requesting the following information:

- Whether you wish to have a month to settle the case.
- What is the location or venue of the case, and why it is chosen.
- Whether any pre-action protocols applied, and whether these were complied with.
- What is the amount of the claim in dispute.
- Who you will call as lay or expert witnesses.
- Whether the case should be considered small claims, or another track.
- How long you think the trial will take.
- How much your costs will be (in Pounds sterling).

== Tracks ==
There are four tracks:

1. Small claims - any claim up to £10,000 and certain personal injury and tenant claims under £1,000.
2. Fast track - disputes involving between £10,000 and £25,000.
3. Intermediate track - disputes valued at between £25,000 and £100,000, and which could be heard in under three days, and requiring no more than two expert witnesses
4. Multi-track - for cases where the value of the claim or the complexity of the evidence and/or legal issues to be decided means the claim is not suitable for the other tracks. All Part 8 proceedings are allocated to the Multi-track.

The Woolf Report had recommended allocation cases to different tracks in 1999.

== See also ==
- Interrogatories
- Unspecified claim
- Settlement conference
- Small claims court
