= Law Terms Act 1830 =

Act of the Parliament of the United Kingdom

Law Terms Act 1830 (Note: The citation of this act by this short title was authorised by section 1 of, and the first schedule to, the Short Titles Act 1896. Due to the repeal of those provisions it is now authorised by section 19(2) of the Interpretation Act 1978.)
- Act of Parliament
- Parliament of the United Kingdom
- Long title: An Act for the more effectual Administration of Justice in England and Wales.
- Citation: 11 Geo. 4. & 1 Will. 4. c. 70
- Territorial extent: United Kingdom

Dates
- Royal assent: 23 July 1830
- Commencement: 12 October 1830 (Note: Section 39.)
- Repealed: 2 May 1986
Other legislation
Amended by	Law Terms (Explanation) Act 1830; Bankruptcy Repeal and Insolvent Court Act 1869; Statute Law Revision Act 1873; Civil Procedure Acts Repeal Act 1879; Statute Law Revision Act 1890; Supreme Court of Judicature (Consolidation) Act 1925; Criminal Justice Act 1948; Statute Law Revision Act 1963; Courts Act 1971
Repealed by	Statute Law (Repeals) Act 1986

Status: Repealed

Text of statute as originally enacted

The Law Terms Act 1830 (11 Geo. 4. & 1 Will. 4. c. 70) was an act of the Parliament of the United Kingdom that made various changes to the court system of England and Wales.

== Provisions ==
Section 8 of the act granted direct appeal from the Court of Common Pleas to the Court of Exchequer Chamber, rather than indirectly through the King's Bench.

Section 14 of the act abolished the independent jurisdiction of the courts of session of the County Palatine of Chester.

== Subsequent developments ==
Sections 1 and 4, section 6, from "provided" to the end, and sections 7 and 8, except as to criminal proceedings, and sections 11, 13, 19, 29 and 27, of the act were repealed by section 2 of, and part I of the schedule to, the Civil Procedure Acts Repeal Act 1879 (42 & 43 Vict. c. 59), which came into force on 15 August 1879.

In section 15 of the act, the words from " save and except " onwards, were repealed by section 1 of, and the schedule to, the Statute Law Revision Act 1963, which came into force on 31 July 1963.

Section 15 of the act was repealed by section 56 of, and part IV of schedule 11 to, the Courts Act 1971, which came into force on 1 January 1972.

In a report dated 27 September 1985, the Law Commission and the Scottish Law Commission said that section 32 was the only provision that had not been repealed. They said that local consultation had confirmed it was obsolete and unnecessary. They recommended the whole act be repealed.

The whole act was repealed by section 1(1) of, and group 1 of part I of schedule 1 to, the Statute Law (Repeals) Act 1986, which came into force on 2 May 1986.

== Bibliography ==
- Cornish, W. R.; Clark, G. de N. (1989). Law and Society in England 1750-1950. London: Sweet & Maxwell. p. 75. ISBN 0421311509.
- Yates, Joseph Brooks (1856). The Rights and Jurisdiction of the County Palatine of Chester, the Earls Palatine, the Chamberlain, and Other Officers. Charles Simms & Co.
