= Settlement conference =

A settlement or pre-trial conference is a meeting between opposing sides of a lawsuit at which the parties attempt to reach a mutually agreeable resolution of their dispute without having to proceed to a trial. Such a conference may be initiated through either party, usually by the conveyance of a settlement offer; or it may be ordered by the court as a precedent (preliminary step) to holding a trial. Each party, the plaintiff and the defendant, is usually represented at the settlement conference by their own counsel or attorney. Conferences are frequently conducted by a judge or other neutral party, in the form of a mediation.

== Case conference ==
In many courts in the common law system, a case conference may be used to settle a case.

In some courts, the rules require that before certain types of motions or petitions will be heard by the judge, the lawyers must "meet and confer" to try to resolve the matter.

== Foreclosure Pre-foreclosure Settlement Conferences ==
On December 1, 2008, the New York State Unified Court System began sending notices to borrowers in default who have high cost mortgages, whose mortgages were being foreclosed prior to September 1, 2008, offering voluntary settlement conferences. Borrowers with high cost mortgages whose mortgages entered or are entering into foreclosure from September 2008 on, will be required to attend a mandatory settlement conference prior to foreclosure proceedings. High cost loans are considered to have excessive fees, risk-based sub-prime percentage rates, negative amortizing payment options, and other features which may or may not be considered predatory lending practices.

On December 15, 2009, Governor David Paterson signed into law an expanded version of the mandatory settlement conference legislation. Section 3408 of the Civil Practice Law and Rules of New York now provides that the court shall hold a mandatory settlement conference for all loans for one to four family homes within sixty days following the date proof of service is filed with the county clerk. The new law also provides that both the defendant homeowner and the plaintiff lender negotiate in good faith during their mandated settlement conference. The plaintiff lender is required to have a representative or attorney appear at the settlement conference with the authority to fully negotiate and settle the matter.

The foreclosure proceedings are effectively stopped until the referee or judicial hearing officer (JHO) in the settlement conference determines that the settlement conferences are concluded, either because the parties have successfully modified the home loan or obtained some other foreclosure alternative or the referee has determined that one of the parties has not satisfied its requirements under the law. Settlement conferences do not produce formal dispositions but may facilitate loan modifications and stop foreclosure. The referee or JHO will make a recommendation to the judge overseeing the foreclosure proceedings once the settlement conference is concluded.

== See also ==
- Allocation questionnaire for the paperwork used to set up the settlement conference for small claims matters in England
- In open court
