= Pay of the Navy Act 1830 =

Act of the Parliament of the United Kingdom

- Act of Parliament
- Parliament of the United Kingdom
- Long title: An Act to amend and consolidate the Laws relating to the Pay of the Royal Navy.
- Citation: 11 Geo. 4 & 1 Will. 4. c. 20
- Introduced by: Thomas Frankland Lewis MP (Commons)
- Territorial extent: United Kingdom

Dates
- Royal assent: 29 May 1830
- Commencement: 29 May 1830 (Note: Section 1.)
- Repealed: 10 September 1866
Other legislation
Amends	See § Repealed enactments
Repeals/revokes	See § Repealed enactments
Amended by	Navy Pay Act 1834; Navy Pay Act 1841; Navy Pay Act 1850; Navy Pay Act 1852; Admiralty, &c. Acts Repeal Act 1865
Repealed by	Naval Discipline Act 1866
Relates to	Treasurer of the Navy Act 1830

Status: Repealed

History of passage through Parliament

Records of Parliamentary debate relating to the statute from Hansard

Text of statute as originally enacted

The Pay of the Navy Act 1830 (11 Geo. 4 & 1 Will. 4. c. 20) was an act of the Parliament of the United Kingdom that consolidated and amended statutes relating to the pay of the Royal Navy.

== Passage ==
The Navy Pay Bill had its first reading in the House of Commons on 30 March 1830, presented by Thomas Frankland Lewis MP. The bill had its second reading in the House of Commons on 26 April 1830 and was committed to a committee of the whole house, which met and reported on 4 May 1830, with amendments. The amended bill was considered on 10 May 1830 and was re-committed to a committee of the whole house, which met and reported on 10 May 1830, with amendments. The amended bill had its third reading in the House of Commons on 10 May 1830 and passed, with amendments.

The amended bill had its first reading in the House of Lords on 11 May 1830. The bill had its second reading in the House of Lords on 12 May 1830 and was committed to a committee of the whole house, which met and reported on 13 May 1830, without amendments. The bill had its third reading in the House of Lords on 14 May 1830 and passed, without amendments.

The bill was granted royal assent on 29 May 1830.

== Provisions ==
=== Repealed enactments ===
Section 1 of the act repealed 20 enactments, listed in that section, effective from the passing of the act.

Section 1 of the act also provided that all penalties and offences committed under the repealed acts before their repeal could still be prosecuted under the repealed acts, and provided that the repeals would not revive any repealed acts.

Citation	Short title	Description	Extent of repeal
1 G. 1. c. 25	Navy, etc. Act 1714	An Act passed in the First Year of the Reign of His late Majesty King George the Second, intituled An Act to prevent Desertion by Seamen and others, and to preserve the Stores belonging to His Majesty's Royal Navy; and also for explaining an Act for the better preventing the Embezzlement of His Majesty's Stores of War, and preventing Cheats, Frauds, and Abuses in paying Seamen's Wages; and for reviving and continuing an Act for the more effectual Suppression of Piracy.	As relates to the Punishment of Persons who shall counterfeit the Hand or Hands of the Comptroller, Clerk of the Acts, Surveyor or Commissioner of the Navy, or of the signing or vouching Officers of His Majesty's Navy, Ships, or Yards, to any Bill, Ticket, or other Paper.
14 G. 2. c. 38	Navy Act 1740	An Act passed in the Fourteenth Year of the Reign of His late Majesty King George the Second, intituled An Act for the Encouragement and Increase of Seamen, and for the better and speedier manning His Majesty's Fleet.	The whole act.
31 G. 2. c. 10	Navy Act 1757	An Act passed in the Thirty-first Year of the Reign of His late Majesty King George the Second, intituled An Act for the Encouragement of Seamen employed in the Royal Navy, and for establishing a regular Method for the punctual, frequent, and certain Payment of their Wages, and for enabling them more easily and readily to remit the same for the Support of their Wives and Families, and for preventing Frauds and Abuses attending such Payments.	The whole act.
32 G. 3. c. 33 (Note: Incorrectly cited as "32 G. 3. c. 23")	Navy Act 1792	An Act passed in the Thirty-second Year of His late Majesty King George the Third, intituled An Act for explaining and amending an Act passed in the Thirty-first Year of the Reign of His late Majesty King George the Second, intituled An Act for the Encouragement of Seamen employed in the Royal Navy, and for establishing a regular Method for the punctual, frequent, and certain Payment of their Wages, and for enabling them more easily and readily to remit the same for the Support of their Wives and Families, and for preventing Frauds and Abuses attending such Payments; and for extending the Benefits thereof to Petty Officers and Seamen, Non-commissioned Officers of Marines, and Marines, serving or who may have served on board any of His Majesty's Ships.	The whole act.
32 G. 3. c. 67	Marines Act 1792	An Act passed in the said Thirty-second Year of the Reign of His late Majesty King George the Third, intituled An Act for extending certain Acts relating to Petty Officers and Seamen, Non-commissioned Officers of Marines, and Marines, serving or who may have served on board any of His Majesty's Ships, and relating to the Payment of Wages and Prize Money to such Persons.	The whole act.
35 G. 3. c. 28	Navy and Marines Act 1795	Two Acts passed in the Thirty-third Year of the Reign of His late Majesty King George the Third, the one intituled An Act to enable such of His Majesty's Seamen, Non-commissioned Officers of Marines, and Marines, serving in His Majesty's Navy, to allot Part of their Pay for the Maintenance of their Wives and Families, and the other intituled An Act for establishing a more easy and expeditious Method for the punctual and frequent Payment of the Wages and Pay of certain Officers belonging to His Majesty's Navy.	The whole act.
35 G. 3. c. 94	Navy Pay Act 1795	Two Acts passed in the Thirty-third Year of the Reign of His late Majesty King George the Third, the one intituled An Act to enable such of His Majesty's Seamen, Non-commissioned Officers of Marines, and Marines, serving in His Majesty's Navy, to allot Part of their Pay for the Maintenance of their Wives and Families, and the other intituled An Act for establishing a more easy and expeditious Method for the punctual and frequent Payment of the Wages and Pay of certain Officers belonging to His Majesty's Navy.	The whole act.
35 G. 3. c. 95	Navy Pay (No. 2) Act 1795	An Act passed in the Thirty-fifth Year of the Reign of His Majesty, intituled An Act to enable Lieutenants, Gunners, and Carpenters to allot Part of their Pay or Prize Money for the Maintenance of their Wives and Families.	The whole act.
37 G. 3. c. 53	Navy Pay, etc. Act 1797	An Act passed in the Thirty-seventh Year of the Reign of His said Majesty, intituled An Act for carrying into execution His Majesty's Order in Council of the Third Day of May One thousand seven hundred and ninety-seven, for an Increase of Pay and Provisions to the Seamen and Marines serving in His Majesty's Navy, and to amend so much of an Act made in the Thirty-fifth Year of the Reign of His present Majesty as enables Petty Officers and Seamen, Non-commissioned Officers of Marines, and Marines, to allot Part of their Pay for the Maintenance of their Wives, Children, or Mothers.	The whole act.
46 G. 3. c. 127	Navy Act 1806	An Act passed in the Forty-sixth Year of the Reign of His said Majesty King George the Third, intituled An Act to extend and consolidate the Provisions of the several Acts relating to the Pay of His Majesty's Navy, to enable Petty Officers, Seamen, and Marines serving in His Majesty's Navy to allot Part of their Pay for the Maintenance of their Wives and Families.	The whole act.
49 G. 3. c. 45	Compassionate List of the Navy, etc. Act 1809	Two Acts passed in the Forty-ninth Year of the Reign of His said Majesty King George the Third, the one intituled An Act for more conveniently paying of Allowances on the Compassionate List of the Navy, and Half Pay to Officers of the Royal Marines, and the other intituled An Act to amend the several Acts respecting the Payment of Wages and Prize Money, and Allotment of Wages, to Persons serving in His Majesty's Royal Navy.	The whole act.
49 G. 3. c. 108	Wages and Prize Money, etc., in the Navy Act 1809	Two Acts passed in the Forty-ninth Year of the Reign of His said Majesty King George the Third, the one intituled An Act for more conveniently paying of Allowances on the Compassionate List of the Navy, and Half Pay to Officers of the Royal Marines, and the other intituled An Act to amend the several Acts respecting the Payment of Wages and Prize Money, and Allotment of Wages, to Persons serving in His Majesty's Royal Navy.	The whole act.
53 G. 3. c. 85	Maintenance of Seamen in Foreign Parts Act 1813	An Act passed in the Fifty-third Year of the Reign of His said Majesty King George the Third, intituled An Act for amending an Act passed in the Thirty-first Year of His late Majesty King George the Second, for the Support of their Wives and Families, and for preventing Frauds and Abuses attending such Payments.	The whole act.
55 G. 3. c. 60	Wills, etc., of Seamen, etc. Act 1815	An Act passed in the Fifty-fifth Year of the Reign of his said Majesty King George the Third, intituled An Act to repeal several Acts relating to the Execution of Letters of Attorney and Wills of Petty Officers, Seamen, and Marines in His Majesty's Navy, and to make more Provisions respecting the same.	The whole act.
56 G. 3. c. 101	Naval Officers' Half Pay Act 1816	An Act passed in the Fifty-sixth Year of the Reign of His late Majesty King George the Third, intituled An Act for enabling the Officers in His Majesty's Navy, and their Representatives, to draw for and receive their Half Pay, and for transferring the Duty of making certain Payments from the Clerks of the Checque at His Majesty's Dock Yards to the Clerks of the Treasurer of the Navy at the same Yards.	The whole act.
57 G. 3. c. 20	Pay of Naval Officers Act 1817	An Act passed in the Fifty-seventh Year of the Reign of His said Majesty King George the Third, intituled An Act for making further Regulations in respect to the Pay of the Officers of the Royal Navy in certain Cases therein mentioned.	The whole act.
59 G. 3. c. 119	Allowance to Navy Agents Act 1819	An Act passed in the Fifty-ninth Year of the Reign of His said Majesty King George the Third, intituled An Act to explain and amend an Act passed in the Thirty-first Year of His Majesty King George the Second, for the Encouragement of Seamen employed in the Royal Navy, to relate to certain Allowances to Navy Agents.	The whole act.
1 & 2 G. 4. c. 49	Navy Pay, etc. Act 1821	An Act passed in the Second Year of the Reign of His present Majesty, intituled An Act for making further Regulations in respect to the Payment of Promotion Bills of Petty Officers, Seamen, and Marines in His Majesty's Royal Navy, and for explaining and Provisions of an Act made in the Fifty-fifth Year of His late Majesty King George the Third, relative to the Payment of Wages of Petty Officers, Seamen, and Marines in His Majesty's Navy.	The whole act.
6 G. 4. c. 18	Navy Pay Act 1825	An Act passed in the Sixth Year of the Reign of His present Majesty, intituled An Act to make further Provision for the Payment of the Crews of His Majesty's Ships and Vessels.	The whole act.
10 G. 4. c. 14	Naval Officers' Widows' Charity Act 1829	An Act passed in the Tenth Year of the Reign of His present Majesty, intituled An Act for repealing several Acts relating to Greenwich Hospital.	The whole act.

== Subsequent developments ==
The act was amended by the Navy Pay Act 1834 (4 & 5 Will. 4. c. 25) and the Navy Pay Act 1852 (15 & 16 Vict. c. 46).

The act was substantially repealed by section 1 of, and the schedule to, the Naval Prize Acts Repeal Act 1864 (27 & 28 Vict. c. 23), which came into force on 1 January 1865.

The whole act was repealed by the Naval Discipline Act 1866 (29 & 30 Vict. c. 109), which came into force on 10 September 1866.
