= Naval Officers' Widows' Charity Act 1829 =

Act of the Parliament of the United Kingdom

- Act of Parliament
- Parliament of the United Kingdom
- Long title: An Act for repealing several Acts relating to the Charity for the Relief of the Poor Widows of Commissioned and Warrant Officers in the Royal Navy, and for substituting other Provisions in lieu thereof.
- Citation: 10 Geo. 4. c. 14
- Territorial extent: United Kingdom

Dates
- Royal assent: 14 May 1829
- Commencement: 1 January 1830 (Note: Section 1.)
- Repealed: 29 May 1830
Other legislation
Amends	See § Repealed enactments
Repeals/revokes	See § Repealed enactments
Repealed by	Pay of the Navy Act 1830
Relates to	Navy and Victualling Departments Act 1829

Status: Repealed

Text of statute as originally enacted

The Naval Officers' Widows' Charity Act 1829 (10 Geo. 4. c. 14) was an act of the Parliament of the United Kingdom that consolidated enactments related to the charity for the relief of poor widows of officers of the Royal Navy.

== Provisions ==
=== Repealed enactments ===
Section 1 of the act repealed 3 enactments, listed in that section.

Citation	Short title	Description	Extent of repeal
6 Geo. 2. c. 25	Supply, etc. Act 1732	An Act for enabling His Majesty to apply Five Hundred Thousand Pounds, out of the Sinking Fund, for the Service of the Year One Thousand Seven Hundred and Thirty-three; and for the further Disposition of the said Fund, by paying off One Million of South Sea Annuities; and for enabling His Majesty, out of the Monies arisen by Sale of Lands in the Island of St. Christopher, to pay the Sum of Eighty Thousand Pounds for the Marriage Portion of the Princess Royal, and Ten Thousand Pounds to the Trustees for establishing the Colony of Georgia in America; and for making good all Deficiencies and Charges by taking of Broad Pieces into the Mint, out of the Coinage Duty; and for appropriating the Supplies granted in this Session of Parliament; and for issuing to the Sub-dean, Treasurer, and Steward, of the Collegiate Church of St. Peter, Westminster, out of the Monies reserved for building Fifty New Churches within the Cities of London and Westminster, and the Suburbs thereof, and for making Provisions for the Ministers of the same, Four Thousand Pounds for the Repair of the said Collegiate Church, and Twelve Hundred Pounds for finishing the Dormitory belonging thereunto.	As relates to the Pensions of Widows of Officers of the Royal Navy.
16 Geo. 3. c. 49	Appropriation Act 1776	An Act for granting to His Majesty a certain Sum of Money out of the Sinking Fund, and for applying certain Monies therein mentioned for the Service of the Year One thousand seven hundred and seventy-six; and for further appropriating the Supplies granted in this Session of Parliament; for giving further Relief to the Widows of Commission and Warrant Officers of the Royal Navy; and for making, forth Duplicates of Exchequer Bills, Lottery Tickets, Certificates, Receipts, Annuity Orders, and other Orders, lost, burnt, or destroyed.	As relates to the Pensions of Widows of Officers of the Royal Navy.
49 Geo. 3. c. 45	Compassionate List of the Navy, etc. Act 1809	An Act for more conveniently paying of Allowances on the Compassionate List of the Navy, and of Half Pay to Officers of the Royal Marines.	As relates to the Pensions of Widows of Officers of the Royal Navy.

== Subsequent developments ==
The whole act was repealed by section 1 of the Pay of the Navy Act 1830 (11 Geo. 4 & 1 Will. 4. c. 20), which came into force on 29 May 1830.
