= List of acts of the Parliament of Great Britain from 1796 =

This is a complete list of acts of the Parliament of Great Britain for the year 1796.

For acts passed until 1707, see the list of acts of the Parliament of England and the list of acts of the Parliament of Scotland. See also the list of acts of the Parliament of Ireland.

For acts passed from 1801 onwards, see the list of acts of the Parliament of the United Kingdom. For acts of the devolved parliaments and assemblies in the United Kingdom, see the list of acts of the Scottish Parliament, the list of acts of the Northern Ireland Assembly, and the list of acts and measures of Senedd Cymru; see also the list of acts of the Parliament of Northern Ireland.

The number shown after each act's title is its chapter number. Acts are cited using this number, preceded by the year(s) of the reign during which the relevant parliamentary session was held; thus the Union with Ireland Act 1800 is cited as "39 & 40 Geo. 3. c. 67", meaning the 67th act passed during the session that started in the 39th year of the reign of George III and which finished in the 40th year of that reign. Note that the modern convention is to use Arabic numerals in citations (thus "41 Geo. 3" rather than "41 Geo. III"). Acts of the last session of the Parliament of Great Britain and the first session of the Parliament of the United Kingdom are both cited as "41 Geo. 3".

Acts passed by the Parliament of Great Britain did not have a short title; however, some of these acts have subsequently been given a short title by acts of the Parliament of the United Kingdom (such as the Short Titles Act 1896).

== 36 Geo. 3 ==
Continuing the sixth session of the 17th Parliament of Great Britain, which met from 29 October 1795 until 19 May 1796.

This session was also traditionally cited as 36 G. 3.

=== Public acts ===
Short title	Citation	Royal assent
Long title
Royal Exchange Assurance Act 1796 (repealed)	36 Geo. 3. c. 26	7 March 1796
An act to explain and enlarge the powers contained in the charter of the Royal Exchange Assurance of houses and goods from fire. (Repealed by Royal Exchange Assurance Act 1901 (1 Edw. 7. c. x))
London Assurance Act 1796 (repealed)	36 Geo. 3. c. 27	7 March 1796
An act to explain and enlarge the powers contained in the charter of the London Assurance of houses and goods from fire. (Repealed by Statute Law Revision Act 1948 (11 & 12 Geo. 6. c. 62))
Marine Mutiny Act 1796 (repealed)	36 Geo. 3. c. 28	7 March 1796
An act for the regulation of his Majesty's marine forces while on shore. (Repealed by Statute Law Revision Act 1871 (34 & 35 Vict. c. 116))
Exchequer Bills Act 1796 (repealed)	36 Geo. 3. c. 29	7 March 1796
An act for raising a sum of money, by loans or exchequer bills, for the service of the year one thousand seven hundred and ninety-six. (Repealed by Statute Law Revision Act 1871 (34 & 35 Vict. c. 116))
Exchequer Bills (No. 2) Act 1796 (repealed)	36 Geo. 3. c. 30	7 March 1796
An act for raising a further sum of money, by loans or exchequer bills, for the service of the year one thousand seven hundred and ninety-six. (Repealed by Statute Law Revision Act 1871 (34 & 35 Vict. c. 116))
Loans or Exchequer Bills Act 1796 (repealed)	36 Geo. 3. c. 31	7 March 1796
An act for enabling his Majesty to raise the sum of two millions five hundred thousand pounds for the uses and purposes therein mentioned. (Repealed by Statute Law Revision Act 1871 (34 & 35 Vict. c. 116))
Indemnity to Governors of West Indies Act 1796 (repealed)	36 Geo. 3. c. 32	7 March 1796
An act for indemnifying governors, lieutenant governors, and persons acting as such, in the West India islands, who have permitted the importation and exportation of goods and commodities in foreign bottoms. (Repealed by Statute Law Revision Act 1871 (34 & 35 Vict. c. 116))
Eau Brink Act 1796 or the Bedford Level (Drainage) Act 1796	36 Geo. 3. c. 33	7 March 1796
An act for extending the term of the tax on lands, and tolls on goods, wares, and merchandizes, granted by an act passed in the thirty-fifth year of the reign of his present Majesty, intituled, "An act for improving the drainage of the middle and south levels part of the great level of the fens called Bedford Level, and the low lands adjoining, or near to the said levels; as also the lands adjoining or near to the river Ouze, in the county of Norfolk, draining through the same to sea by the harbour of King's Lynn, in the said county; and for altering and improving the navigation of the said river Ouze, from or near a place called Eau Brink, in the parish of Wiggenhall Saint Mary, in the said county to the said harbour of King's Lynn; and for improving and preserving the navigation of the several rivers communicating with the said river Ouze." (Note: Eau Brink Act 1795 (35 Geo. 3. c. 77))
Thames and Severn Canal Act 1796	36 Geo. 3. c. 34	7 March 1796
An act to enable the company of proprietors of the Thames and Severn canal navigation to raise a certain sum of money for discharging some arrears of interest, and other debts relating thereto, and to maintain and support the said navigation.
Saint Bride's Church, City Act 1796 (repealed)	36 Geo. 3. c. 35	7 March 1796
An act to enable the trustees for executing an act passed in the thirty-second year of the reign of his present Majesty, (Note: Saint Bride Church Act 1792 (32 Geo. 3. c. 64)) for repairing, altering, and improving the parish church of Saint Bridget, otherwise Saint Bride, in the city of London; and for providing a workhouse for the same; to raise a further sum of money for completing the purposes of the said act. (Repealed by Statute Law (Repeals) Act 2013 (c. 2))
Quartering of Soldiers Act 1796 (repealed)	36 Geo. 3. c. 36	7 March 1796
An act for encreasing the rates of subsistence to be paid to innkeepers and others on quartering soldiers. (Repealed by Statute Law Revision Act 1871 (34 & 35 Vict. c. 116))
Courts (Newfoundland) Act 1796 (repealed)	36 Geo. 3. c. 37	7 March 1796
An act for further continuing an act made in the thirty-third year of the reign of his present Majesty, intituled, "An act for establishing courts of judicature in the island of Newfoundland and the islands adjacent." (Note: Courts (Newfoundland) Act 1793 (33 Geo. 3. c. 76)) (Repealed by Statute Law Revision Act 1871 (34 & 35 Vict. c. 116))
Poor (Shropshire) etc. Act 1796 (repealed)	36 Geo. 3. c. 38	7 March 1796
An act for rendering effectual an act of the thirty-second year of his present Majesty, for the better relief and employment of the poor of the parishes of Montgomery and Pool, and the places united therewith, in the counties of Montgomery and Salop. (Repealed by Montgomery and Pool Poor Relief Act 1825 (6 Geo. 4. c. cxxiii))
Game Act 1796 (repealed)	36 Geo. 3. c. 39	24 March 1796
An act to amend an act, made in the second year of the reign of his present Majesty, intituled, "An act for the better preservation of the game in that part of Great Britain, called England." (Note: Game Act 1762 (2 Geo. 3. c. 19)) (Repealed by Partridges Act 1799 (39 Geo. 3. c. 34))
Continuance of Laws Act 1796 (repealed)	36 Geo. 3. c. 40	24 March 1796
An act to continue several laws relating to the giving further encouragement to the importation of naval stores from the British colonies in America; to the encouragement of the silk manufactures; and for taking off several duties on merchandize exported, and reducing other duties; to the preventing the clandestine running of goods, and the danger of infection thereby; to the encouraging the growth of coffee in his Majesty's plantations in America; to the free importation of cochineal and indigo; to the granting a bounty on certain species of British and Irish linens exported, and taking off the duties on the importation of foreign raw linen yarns, made of flax; to the importing salt from Europe into the province of Quebec in America; to the encouraging the manufacture of leather, by lowering the duty payable upon the importation of oak bark, when the price of such bark shall exceed a certain rate; to the more effectual encouragement of the manufactures of flax and cotton in Great Britain; to the allowing the importation of rape seed, and other seeds used for extracting oil, whenever the prices of middling British rape feed shall be above a certain limit; to the allowing a drawback of the duties on rum shipped as stores, to be consumed on board merchant ships in their voyages; to the clandestine running of uncustomed goods, and preventing frauds relating to the customs; to the further punishment of persons going armed or disguised, in defiance of the laws of customs or excise; to the free importation of certain raw hides and skins from Ireland, and the British plantations in America; and to the duties on spirits made in Scotland, and imported into England. (Repealed by Statute Law Revision Act 1871 (34 & 35 Vict. c. 116))
Militia Pay Act 1796 (repealed)	36 Geo. 3. c. 41	24 March 1796
An act for defraying the charge of the pay and cloathing of the militia, in that part of Great Britain called England, for one year beginning the twenty-fifth day of March one thousand seven hundred and ninety-six. (Repealed by Statute Law Revision Act 1871 (34 & 35 Vict. c. 116))
Warwick and Birmingham Canal Act 1796 (repealed)	36 Geo. 3. c. 42	24 March 1796
An act for enabling the company of proprietors of the Warwick and Birmingham canal navigation to finish and complete the same; and for amending the act of parliament, passed in the thirty-third year of the reign of his present Majesty, (Note: Warwick and Birmingham Canal Act 1793 (33 Geo. 3. c. 38)) for making the said canal. (Repealed by Grand Union Canal Act 1943 (6 & 7 Geo. 6. c. v))
Ramsgate (Improvement) Act 1796 (repealed)	36 Geo. 3. c. 43	24 March 1796
An act to enlarge the powers of an act, passed in the twenty-fifth year of the reign of his present Majesty, intituled, "An act for the better paving, cleansing, repairing, lighting, and watching, the highways, streets, and lanes, of, and in the vill of Ramsgate, in the county of Kent, and for removing and preventing annoyances therein, and for erecting a market house, and holding a publick market in the said vill." (Note: Ramsgate (Streets) Act 1785 (25 Geo. 3. c. 34)) (Repealed by Ramsgate Improvement Act 1838 (1 & 2 Vict. c. lxx))
Kennet and Avon Canal Act 1796	36 Geo. 3. c. 44	24 March 1796
An act to vary and alter the line of the canal, authorised to be made by an act passed in the thirty-fourth year of the reign of his present Majesty, intituled, "An act for making a navigable canal from the river Kennet, at or near the town or Newbury, in the county of Berks, to the river Avon, at or near the city of Bath; and also certain navigable cuts therein described;" (Note: Kennet and Avon Canal Act 1794 (34 Geo. 3. c. 90)) and to amend the said act; and also to make a certain navigable cut therein described.
Deal Improvement Act 1796 (repealed)	36 Geo. 3. c. 45	24 March 1796
An act to amend and render more effectual an act, passed in the thirty-first year of the reign of his present Majesty, intituled, "An act for repairing, paving, and cleansing, the highways, streets, and lanes, within the town and borough of Deal, in the county of Kent, and for removing and preventing encroachments, obstructions, nuisances and annoyances therein." (Note: Deal Improvement Act 1791 (31 Geo. 3. c. 64)) (Repealed by Deal Improvement Act 1812 (52 Geo. 3. c. lxxiii))
Grand Western Canal Act 1796	36 Geo. 3. c. 46	24 March 1796
An act for making a navigable canal from the river Exe, near the town of Topsham, in the county of Devon, to the river Tone, near the town of Taunton, in the county of Somerset; and for cleansing and making navigable a certain part of the said river Tone; and for making certain cuts from the said canal.
Dorset and Wiltshire Canal Act 1796	36 Geo. 3. c. 47	24 March 1796
An act for making a navigable canal from or near Gain's Cross, in the parish of Shillington Okeford, in the county of Dorset, to communicate with the Kennet and Avon canal, at or near Widbrook; in the county of Wilts, and also a certain navigable branch from the intended canal.
Somerset Canal Act 1796	36 Geo. 3. c. 48	24 March 1796
An act to vary and alter the line of a canal authorised to be made by an act, passed in the thirty-fourth year of the reign of his present Majesty, intituled, "An act for making and maintaining a navigable canal, with certain railways and stone roads, from several collieries in the county of Somerset, to communicate with the intended Kennet and Avon canal, in the parish of Bradford, in the county of Wilts," (Note: Somersetshire Coal Canal Act 1794 (34 Geo. 3. c. 86)) and to alter and amend the said act.
Folkestone Improvement Act 1796 (repealed)	36 Geo. 3. c. 49	24 March 1796
An act for paving, repairing, and cleansing the highways, streets, and lanes, in the town of Folkestone, and liberty thereof, in the county of Kent, and for removing and preventing nuisances and annoyances therein. (Repealed by Folkestone Improvement Act 1855 (18 & 19 Vict. c. cxlvii))
Wakefield Improvement Act 1796	36 Geo. 3. c. 50	24 March 1796
An act for lighting and watching the streets, and other publick passages and places, within the town of Wakefield in the county of York and for more effectually cleansing the same and removing and preventing obstructions, nuisances, and annoyances therein.
Beccles Improvement Act 1796	36 Geo. 3. c. 51	24 March 1796
An act for paving, lighting, cleaning, and otherwise improving, the streets, and other publick passages and places, within the town of Beccles, in the county of Suffolk.
Legacy Duty Act 1796 (repealed)	36 Geo. 3. c. 52	26 April 1796
An act for repealing certain duties on legacies and shares of personal estates, and for granting other duties thereon, in certain cases. (Repealed by Statute Law Revision Act 1888 (51 & 52 Vict. c. 3))
Exportation Act 1796 (repealed)	36 Geo. 3. c. 53	26 April 1796
An act for indemnifying all persons who have been concerned in advising or carrying into execution an order of his Majesty in council respecting the exportation of rock salt; for preventing suits in consequence of the same; for authorising his Majesty to prohibit the exportation or carrying coastwise of rock salt; and for making further provisions relative thereto. (Repealed by Statute Law Revision Act 1861 (24 & 25 Vict. c. 101))
Game (Scotland) Act 1796 (repealed)	36 Geo. 3. c. 54	26 April 1796
An act to amend an act, made in the thirteenth year of the reign of his present Majesty, intituled, "An act for the more effectual preservation of the game in that part of Great Britain called Scotland;" (Note: Game (Scotland) Act 1772 (13 Geo. 3. c. 54)) and for repealing and amending several of the laws now in being relative thereto. (Repealed by Partridges Act 1799 (39 Geo. 3. c. 34))
Free Ports Act 1796 (repealed)	36 Geo. 3. c. 55	26 April 1796
An act for making the port of Scarborough, in the island of Tobago, a free port under certain regulations and restrictions. (Repealed by Statute Law Revision Act 1861 (24 & 25 Vict. c. 101))
Bounties Act 1796 (repealed)	36 Geo. 3. c. 56	26 April 1796
An act for amending an act, made in this present session of parliament, intituled, "An act for allowing bounties for a limited time on the importation into Great Britain of any wheat, wheat flour, Indian corn, Indian meal, or rye, in British ships, or other ships the property of persons of any kingdom or state in amity with his Majesty, or on the delivery of the same out of warehouse for home consumption." (Note: Bounties Act 1795 (36 Geo. 3. c. 21)) (Repealed by Statute Law Revision Act 1871 (34 & 35 Vict. c. 116))
Indemnity Act 1796 (repealed)	36 Geo. 3. c. 57	26 April 1796
An act to indemnify such persons as have omitted to qualify themselves for offices and employments; and to indemnify justices of the peace, or others, who have omitted to register or deliver in their qualifications within the time limited by law, and for giving further time for those purposes; and to indemnify members and officers, in cities, corporations, and borough towns, whose admissions have been omitted to be stamped according to law, or having been stamped, have been lost or mislaid, and for allowing them time to provide admissions duly stamped; to give further time to such persons as have omitted to make and file affidavits of the execution of indentures of clerks to attornies and solicitors; and for indemnifying deputy-lieutenants and officers of the militia, who have neglected to transmit descriptions of their qualifications to the clerks of the peace within the time limited by law, and for allowing further time for that purpose. (Repealed by Promissory Oaths Act 1871 (34 & 35 Vict. c. 48))
Trade with America Act 1796 (repealed)	36 Geo. 3. c. 58	26 April 1796
An act to continue the laws now in force for regulating the trade between the subjects of his Majesty's dominions and the inhabitants of the territories belonging to the United States of America, so far as the same relate to the trade and commerce carried on between this kingdom and the inhabitants of the countries belonging to the said United States. (Repealed by Statute Law Revision Act 1871 (34 & 35 Vict. c. 116))
Controverted Elections Act 1796 (repealed)	36 Geo. 3. c. 59	26 April 1796
An act for the more effectual execution of several acts of parliament, made for the trials of controverted elections, or returns of members to serve in parliament. (Repealed by Controverted Elections Act 1828 (9 Geo. 4. c. 22))
Metal Button Act 1796 (repealed)	36 Geo. 3. c. 60	26 April 1796
An act to regulate the making and vending of metal buttons; and to prevent the purchasers thereof from being deceived in the real quality of such buttons. (Repealed by Statute Law Revision Act 1871 (34 & 35 Vict. c. 116), Summary Jurisdiction Act 1884 (47 & 48 Vict. c. 43), Statute Law Revision Act 1887 (50 & 51 Vict. c. 59), Public Authorities Protection Act 1893 (56 & 57 Vict. c. 61), Statute Law Revision Act 1948 (11 & 12 Geo. 6. c. 62) and Statute Law Revision Act 1953 (2 & 3 Eliz. 2. c. 5))
Coal Trade (London) Act 1796 (repealed)	36 Geo. 3. c. 61	26 April 1796
An act for further continuing and amending the several acts passed for preventing the frauds and abuses committed in the admeasurement of coals, within the city and liberty of Westminster, and that part of the duchy of Lancaster adjoining thereto, and the several parishes of Saint Giles in the Fields, and Saint Mary-le-bone, and such part of the parish of Saint Andrew, Holborn, as lies in the county of Middlesex. (Repealed by London, Westminster, Middlesex, Surrey, Kent and Essex Coal Trade Act 1807 (47 Geo. 3 Sess. 2. c. lxviii))
Crown Lands in Northamptonshire (Grant to Earl of Westmorland) Act 1796 (repealed)	36 Geo. 3. c. 62	26 April 1796
An act to enable his Majesty to grant to John earl of Westmorland, his heirs and assigns, in fee simple, all the estate, right, title, and interest, remaining in his Majesty, in and upon the hayes or walks of Sulehay Fermes and Shortwood, and Morehay, in the forest of Rockingham, in the county of Northampton, upon a full and adequate consideration to be paid for the same. (Repealed by Statute Law (Repeals) Act 1978 (c. 45))
Crown Lands in Northamptonshire (Grant to Earl of Exeter) Act 1796 (repealed)	36 Geo. 3. c. 63	26 April 1796
An act to enable his Majesty to grant to Henry earl of Exeter, his heirs and assigns, in fee simple, all the estate, right, title, and interest, remaining in his Majesty, in and upon the haye or walk of Westhay, in the forest of Rockingham, in the county of Northampton, upon a full and adequate consideration to be paid for the same. (Repealed by Statute Law (Repeals) Act 1978 (c. 45))
Finch Hatton's Estate Act 1796 (repealed)	36 Geo. 3. c. 64	26 April 1796
An act to enable his Majesty to grant to George Finch Hatton, esquire, his heirs and assigns, in fee simple, all the estate, right, title, and interest, remaining in his Majesty, in and upon the lawn of Benefield, and the bailiwick of Rockingham, in the forest of Rockingham, in the county of Northampton upon a full and adequate consideration to be paid for the same. (Repealed by Rockingham and Gretton Inclosure and Deforestation Act 1832 (2 & 3 Will. 4. c. 22 Pr.))
Saint Paul, Covent Garden (Church Rebuilding) Act 1796 (repealed)	36 Geo. 3. c. 65	26 April 1796
An act for the rebuilding the parish church of Saint Paul, Covent-Garden, within the liberty of Westminster, in the county of Middlesex, and the vestry rooms belonging thereto; for repairing and reinstating the iron rails inclosing the scite of the said church, and the gates leading thereto; and for making several regulations relating to the said parish. (Repealed by Parish of St. Paul Covent Garden Act 1829 (10 Geo. 4. c. lxviii))
Maidstone, Kent (Watching) Act 1796 (repealed)	36 Geo. 3. c. 66	26 April 1796
An act for enabling the commissioners for executing an act passed in the thirty-first year of the reign of his present Majesty, intituled, "An act for widening, improving, regulating, paving, cleansing, and lighting the streets, lanes, and other publick passages and places, within the King's town of Maidstone, in the county of Kent; for removing and preventing encroachments, obstructions, nuisances, and annoyances therein; for better supplying the said town with water, and for repairing the highways within the parish of Maidstone," (Note: Maidstone Improvement Act 1791 (31 Geo. 3. c. 62)) to raise a further sum of money for completing the purposes of the said act. (Repealed by Local Government Supplemental Act 1866 (No. 4) (29 & 30 Vict. c. 107))
Tavistock Canal Act 1796	36 Geo. 3. c. 67	26 April 1796
An act for making and maintaining a navigation for Morwellham Quay, in the parish of Tavistock, in the county of Devon, to Tamerton bridge, in the parish of North Tamerton, in the county of Cornwall, and also a certain collateral cut from Powlston Bridge, in the parish of Liston, in the said county of Devon, to Richgrove mill, in the parish of Saint Stephen, near to the borough of Launceston, in the said county of Cornwall.
Aberdeenshire Canal Act 1796	36 Geo. 3. c. 68	26 April 1796
An act for making and maintaining a navigable canal from the harbour of Aberdeen, in the parish of Aberdeen, or Saint Nicolas, into the river Don, at or near the south end of the bridge over the same (adjacent to the royal burgh of Inverurie) in the parish of Kintore, all within the county of Aberdeen, North Britain.
Glamorganshire Canal Act 1796 (repealed)	36 Geo. 3. c. 69	26 April 1796
An act to amend an act of the thirtieth year of his present Majesty, (Note: Glamorganshire Canal Act 1790 (30 Geo. 3. c. 82)) for making and maintaining a navigable canal from Merthyr Tidvile, to and through a place called the Bank, near the town of Cardiff, in the county of Glamorgan, and for extending the said canal to a place called the Lower Layer, below the said town. (Repealed by Mid Glamorgan County Council Act 1987 (c. vii))
Leominster Canal Act 1796	36 Geo. 3. c. 70	26 April 1796
An act to enable the Leominster canal navigation to finish and complete the same.
Ellesmere and Chester Canal Act 1796 (repealed)	36 Geo. 3. c. 71	26 April 1796
An act to explain and amend an act passed in the thirty-third year of the reign of his present Majesty, intituled, "An act for making and maintaining a navigable canal, from the river Severn at Shrewsbury, in the county of Salop, to the river Mersey, at or near Netherpool, in the county of Chester, and also for making and maintaining certain collateral cuts from the said intended canal;" (Note: Ellesmere and Chester Canal Act 1793 (33 Geo. 3. c. 91)) and for varying and altering certain parts of the Whitchurch line of the said canal and collateral cuts, and for extending the same from Franckton common to Sherryman's bridge, in the parish of Whitchurch, in the said county of Salop, and for making and maintaining several other branches and collateral cuts to communicate therewith. (Repealed by Ellesmere and Chester Canals Unification Act 1813 (53 Geo. 3. c. lxxx) and Ellesmere and Chester Canal Act 1827 (7 & 8 Geo. 4. c. cii))
Ramsey (Huntingdonshire) Drainage, etc. Act 1796	36 Geo. 3. c. 72	26 April 1796
An act for dividing, allotting, enclosing, draining, and preserving certain commons and waste grounds, called the Hern Common, and Gore Common, within the manor and parish of Ramsey, in the county of Huntingdon, and for repealing an act made in the thirtieth year of the reign of his late majesty King George the Second, intituled, "An act for draining and preserving certain fen lands and low grounds in the several parishes of Ramsey, Bury, Wistow, Warboys, Farceitt, Standground, and Water Newton, in the county of Huntingdon, and of Doddington, in the isle of Ely, and county of Cambridge," (Note: Isle of Ely Drainage Act 1757 (30 Geo. 2. c. 33)) and for making more effectual provision for those purposes.
Bedford Level Act 1796	36 Geo. 3. c. 73	26 April 1796
An act for laying an additional tax upon the lands within the North Level, part of the great level of the fens, called Bedford Level, and on Portsand, otherwise Great Porsand, in the county of Lincoln, for the further support and preservation of the principal banks and works of the said North Level.
National Debt Act 1796 (repealed)	36 Geo. 3. c. 74	14 May 1796
An act for raising the sum of seven millions five hundred thousand pounds, by way of annuities. (Repealed by Statute Law Revision Act 1870 (33 & 34 Vict. c. 69))
Metropolitan Justices Act 1796 (repealed)	36 Geo. 3. c. 75	14 May 1796
An act for further continuing for a limited time, an act made in the thirty-second year the reign of his present Majesty, intituled, "An act for the more effectual administration of the office of a justice of the peace in such parts of the counties of Middlesex and Surrey, as lie in and near the metropolis, and for the more effectual prevention of felonies." (Note: Middlesex Justices Act 1792 (32 Geo. 3. c. 53)) (Repealed by Metropolitan Police Magistrates Act 1802 (42 Geo. 3. c. 76))
Merchandise in Neutral Ships Act 1796 (repealed)	36 Geo. 3. c. 76	14 May 1796
An act to indemnify all persons who have acted in consequence of orders in council, issued since the twenty-second day of November one thousand seven hundred and ninety-five, for the admission of certain articles of merchandize in neutral ships; and to authorise the issuing orders in council for the like purpose, for a limited time. (Repealed by Goods in Neutral Ships Act 1802 (42 Geo. 3. c. 80))
Mackerel Fishery Act 1796 (repealed)	36 Geo. 3. c. 77	14 May 1796
An act to explain and amend an act made in the last session of parliament, intituled, "An act for the encouragement of the mackarel fishery." (Note: Mackerel Fishery Act 1795 (35 Geo. 3. 54)) (Repealed by Sea Fisheries Act 1868 (31 & 32 Vict. c. 45))
Customs Act 1796 (repealed)	36 Geo. 3. c. 78	14 May 1796
An act for charging the duty on mahogany imported by weight. (Repealed by Statute Law Revision Act 1861 (24 & 25 Vict. c. 101))
Customs (No. 2) Act 1796 (repealed)	36 Geo. 3. c. 79	14 May 1796
An act for reducing the duty payable on black lead imported into this kingdom. (Repealed by Statute Law Revision Act 1861 (24 & 25 Vict. c. 101))
Stamps Act 1796 (repealed)	36 Geo. 3. c. 80	14 May 1796
An act for repealing the stamp duties on licences to sell gloves and mittens by retail. (Repealed by Statute Law Revision Act 1871 (34 & 35 Vict. c. 116))
Importation Act 1796 (repealed)	36 Geo. 3. c. 81	14 May 1796
An act for allowing the importation of melasses from any country in British ships or vessels, and in ships or vessels belonging to any state in amity with his Majesty, for a limited time. (Repealed by Statute Law Revision Act 1871 (34 & 35 Vict. c. 116))
Landing of Merchandise Act 1796 (repealed)	36 Geo. 3. c. 82	14 May 1796
An act more effectually to prevent the landing of goods, wares, and merchandize, without the presence of the proper officer; to authorise officers of the customs to convey wines laying on the quays to his Majesty's warehouse within a certain time after the landing there of; and to require the owners of ships, vessels, and boats, licensed by the admiralty, to give security to redeliver their licences, in case any such ships, vessels, or boats, shall be lost, broken up, or otherwise disposed of. (Repealed by Customs Law Repeal Act 1825 (6 Geo. 4. c. 105))
Curates, etc. Act 1796 (repealed)	36 Geo. 3. c. 83	14 May 1796
An act for the further support and maintenance of curates within the church of England, and for making certain regulations respecting the appointment of such curates, and the admission persons to cures augmented by Queen Anne's bounty, with respect to the avoidance of other benefices. (Repealed by Statute Law Revision Act 1871 (34 & 35 Vict. c. 116))
Post Horse Duties Act 1796 (repealed)	36 Geo. 3. c. 84	14 May 1796
An act for further continuing, for a limited time, an act made in the twenty-seventh year of the reign of his present Majesty, intituled, "An act to enable the lord high treasurer, or commissioners of the treasury for the time being, to let to farm the duties granted by an act, made in the twenty-fifth year of his present Majesty's reign, (Note: Duties on Post Horses, etc. Act 1785 (25 Geo. 3. c. 51)) on horses let to hire for travelling post, and by time, to such persons as should be willing to contract for the same." (Note: Post Horse Duties Act 1787 (27 Geo. 3. c. 26)) (Repealed by Statute Law Revision Act 1871 (34 & 35 Vict. c. 116))
Mills Act 1796 (repealed)	36 Geo. 3. c. 85	14 May 1796
An act for the better regulation of mills. (Repealed by Statute Law Revision Act 1960 (8 & 9 Eliz. 2. c. 56))
Sale of Butter Act 1796 (repealed)	36 Geo. 3. c. 86	14 May 1796
An act to prevent abuses and frauds in the packing, weight, and sale of butter; and to repeal certain acts relating thereto. (Repealed by Butter and Cheese Trade Act 1844 (7 & 8 Vict. c. 48))
Pawnbrokers Act 1796	36 Geo. 3. c. 87	14 May 1796
An act for regulating the trade or business of pawnbrokers.
Hay and Straw Act 1796 (repealed)	36 Geo. 3. c. 88	14 May 1796
An act to regulate the buying and selling of hay and straw; and for repealing so much of two acts, made in the second year of the reign of King William and Queen Mary, (Note: London Streets, etc. Act 1690 (2 Will. & Mar. Sess. 2. c. 8)) and in the thirty-first year of the reign of King George the Second, (Note: Sale of Hay and Straw and of Cattle, London Act 1757 (31 Geo. 2. c. 40)) as relate to the buying and selling of hay and straw, within the limits therein mentioned. (Repealed by Theft Act 1968 (c. 60))
Land Tax Act 1796 (repealed)	36 Geo. 3. c. 89	14 May 1796
An act for assessing the commissioners, clerks, and other officers of the duties on salt, for their salaries and the profits of their respective offices, to the land tax in the parish of Saint Martin in the Fields, within the city and liberty of Westminster, notwithstanding the said office has been removed into Somerset Place, within the duchy liberty in the Strand, in the county of Middlesex. (Repealed by Statute Law Revision Act 1871 (34 & 35 Vict. c. 116))
Bank of England Stock Act 1796 (repealed)	36 Geo. 3. c. 90	14 May 1796
An act for the relief of persons equitably and beneficially entitled to or interested in the several stocks and annuities transferrable at the bank of England. (Repealed by Infants, Lunatics, etc. Act 1825 (6 Geo. 4. c. 74))
Million Bank Act 1796 (repealed)	36 Geo. 3. c. 91	14 May 1796
An act for dissolving a certain partnership, society, or undertaking called the Million Bank, and for dividing the joint stock and funds belonging thereto, amongst the members thereof. (Repealed by Statute Law Revision Act 1948 (11 & 12 Geo. 6. c. 62))
London Militia Act 1796 (repealed)	36 Geo. 3. c. 92	14 May 1796
An act for amending and reducing into one act of parliament two several acts, passed in the thirty-fourth (Note: City of London Militia Act 1794 (34 Geo. 3. c. 81)) and thirty-fifth (Note: City of London Militia Act 1795 (35 Geo. 3. c. 27)) years of his present Majesty, for the better ordering the militia of the city of London; and for the further regulating of the trained bands, or militia, of the said city. (Repealed by Militia (City of London) Act 1820 (1 Geo. 4. c. 100))
Swansea Harbour Act 1796 (repealed)	36 Geo. 3. c. 93	14 May 1796
An act to amend and render more effectual an act, made in the thirty-first year of his present Majesty, (Note: Swansea Harbour Act 1791 (31 Geo. 3. c. 83)) for repairing, enlarging, and preserving the harbour of Swansea, in the county of Glamorgan and for making improvements in the lights at the Mumbles. (Repealed by Swansea Harbour Act 1854 (17 & 18 Vict. c. cxxvi))
Northam Bridge and Approaches Act 1796 (repealed)	36 Geo. 3. c. 94	14 May 1796
An act for building a bridge over the river Itchin, at or near Northam, within the liberties of the town, and county of the town of Southampton, and for making a road from the said town to the said bridge, and from thence to communicate with the road leading from West End to Botley, in the county of Southampton. (Repealed by Southampton Corporation Act 1928 (18 & 19 Geo. 5. c. cviii))
Warwick and Napton Canal Act 1796	36 Geo. 3. c. 95	14 May 1796
An act for authorising the company of proprietors of the Warwick and Braunston canal navigation to vary the course of a certain part of the said canal, and for amending and altering the act made in the thirty-fourth year of the reign of his present Majesty, (Note: Warwick and Napton Canal Act 1794 (34 Geo. 3. c. 38)) for making the said canal.
Ellesmere and Chester Canal (No. 2) Act 1796 (repealed)	36 Geo. 3. c. 96	14 May 1796
An act to explain and amend an act, passed in the thirty-third year of the reign of his present Majesty, intituled, "An act for making and maintaining a navigable canal from the river Severn, at Shrewsbury, in the county of Salop, to the river Mersey, at or near Netherpool, in the county of Chester; and also for making and maintaining certain collateral cuts from the said intended canal;" and for varying and altering certain parts of the course of the said canal and collateral cuts between Ruabon and Chester, and for making and maintaining several other branches and collateral cuts to communicate therewith. (Repealed by Ellesmere and Chester Canals Unification Act 1813 (53 Geo. 3. c. lxxx) and Ellesmere and Chester Canal Act 1827 (7 & 8 Geo. 4. c. cii))
Duchy of Lancaster Act 1796	36 Geo. 3. c. 97	14 May 1796
An act to enable his Majesty, in right of his duchy of Lancaster, to make a grant of certain lands, for the purpose of carrying into execution an act, passed in the thirty-second year of the reign of his present Majesty, intituled, "An act for making and maintaining a navigable canal from Kirkby Kendal, in the county of Westmorland, to West Houghton, in the county palatine of Lancaster; and also a navigable branch from the said intended canal, at or near Borwick, to or near Warton Cragg; and also another navigable branch from, at, or near Gale Moss, by Chorley, to or near Duxbury, in the said county palatine of Lancaster." (Note: Westmoreland Canals Act 1792 (32 Geo. 3. c. 101))
Great Grimsby (Lincoln) Harbour Act 1796 or the Grimsby Haven Act 1796 (repealed)	36 Geo. 3. c. 98	14 May 1796
An act for widening, deepening, enlarging, altering, and improving the haven of the town and port of Great Grimsby, in the county of Lincoln. (Repealed by Grimsby Docks Act 1845 (8 & 9 Vict. c. ccii) and Manchester, Sheffield and Lincolnshire Railway Act 1849 (12 & 13 Vict. c. lxxxi))
Everton, etc. (Nottinghamshire) Drainage, etc. Act 1796 (repealed)	36 Geo. 3. c. 99	14 May 1796
An act for the more effectually embanking, draining, preserving, and improving certain low lands and grounds, lying and being in the several parishes or townships of Everton, Scaftworth, Grindley on the Hill, Misterton, and Walkeringham, in the county of Nottingham. (Repealed by Everton, Scaftworth, Gringley-on-the-Hill, Misterton and Walkeringham Drainage Act 1801 (41 Geo. 3. (U.K.) c. cxxxvi) and Everton, &c. Drainage Act 1860 (23 & 24 Vict. c. cliv))
Marshland, Norfolk (Drainage) Act 1796	36 Geo. 3. c. 100	14 May 1796
An act for draining and improving, and for inclosing, dividing, and allotting, certain tracts of common and waste lands, called Marshland Smeeth, and Marshland Fen, lying within the country of Marshland, in the county of Norfolk; and for stinting and regulating the stocking, feeding, and depasturing of the said smeeth and fen, until the inclosure, division, and allotment thereof.
Gainsborough Inclosure Act 1796	36 Geo. 3. c. 101	14 May 1796
An act for dividing, allotting, inclosing, draining, embanking, and improving the open and common fields, ings, meadows, pastures, and other commonable lands and waste grounds, within the several townships of Morton, Walkerith, East Stockwith, Bliton, Wharton, Pilham, and Gilby, in the several parishes of Gainsburgh, Bliton, and Pilham, in the county of Lincoln.
Lincoln Poor Relief Act 1796 (repealed)	36 Geo. 3. c. 102	14 May 1796
An act for the better relief and employment of the poor of the several parishes within the city of Lincoln, and county of the same city, and of the parish of Saint Margaret, part whereof lies within the said city, and the other part in the close of Lincoln, in the county of Lincoln. (Repealed by Statute Law (Repeals) Act 2013 (c. 2))
Saint Martin Outwich Church, City Act 1796 (repealed)	36 Geo. 3. c. 103	14 May 1796
An act for re-building the parish church of Saint Martin Outwich, in Threadneedle-street, within the city of London. (Repealed by Statute Law (Repeals) Act 2013 (c. 2))
Lottery Act 1796 (repealed)	36 Geo. 3. c. 104	18 May 1796
An act for granting to his Majesty a certain sum of money, to be raised by a lottery. (Repealed by Statute Law Revision Act 1871 (34 & 35 Vict. c. 116))
National Debt (No. 2) Act 1796 (repealed)	36 Geo. 3. c. 105	18 May 1796
An act for granting to his Majesty the sum of 200,000l. to be issued and paid to the governor and company of the bank of England, to be by them placed to the account of the commissioners for the reduction of the national debt. (Repealed by Statute Law Revision Act 1861 (24 & 25 Vict. c. 101))
Drawback Act 1796 (repealed)	36 Geo. 3. c. 106	18 May 1796
An act to amend an act, made in the last session of parliament, (Note: Drawback (No. 2) Act 1795 (35 Geo. 3. c. 110)) intituled, "An act to amend an act made in the thirty-second year of the reign of his present Majesty, (Note: Customs (No. 2) Act 1792 (32 Geo. 3. c. 43)) intituled, 'An act for regulating the allowance of the drawback and payment of the bounty on the exportation of sugar, and for permitting the importation of sugar and coffee into the Bahama and Bermuda islands in foreign ships; and for reducing the bounty on refined sugars exported in any other than British ships.'" (Repealed by Statute Law Revision Act 1871 (34 & 35 Vict. c. 116))
Longitude at Sea Act 1796 (repealed)	36 Geo. 3. c. 107	18 May 1796
An act for continuing the encouragement and reward of persons making certain discoveries for finding the longitude at sea, or making other useful discoveries and improvements in navigation, and for making experiments relating thereto. (Repealed by Statute Law Revision Act 1871 (34 & 35 Vict. c. 116))
Continuance of Laws (No. 2) Act 1796 (repealed)	36 Geo. 3. c. 108	18 May 1796
An act to continue several laws, therein-mentioned, relating to the better encouragement of the making of sail cloth in Great Britain, to the encouraging the manufacture of British sail cloth, and securing the duties on foreign fail cloth imported; to securing the duties upon foreign made sail cloth, and charging foreign made sails with a duty; and to the allowing a bounty on the exportation of British made cordage. (Repealed by Statute Law Revision Act 1871 (34 & 35 Vict. c. 116))
Aliens Act 1796 (repealed)	36 Geo. 3. c. 109	18 May 1796
An act further to continue an act, made in the thirty-third year of the reign of his present Majesty, intituled, "An act for establishing regulations respecting aliens arriving in this kingdom, or resident therein, in certain cases." (Note: Aliens Act 1793 (33 Geo. 3. c. 4)) (Repealed by Statute Law Revision Act 1871 (34 & 35 Vict. c. 116))
Customs (No. 3) Act 1796 (repealed)	36 Geo. 3. c. 110	18 May 1796
An act for permitting the carrying coastwise of lime, limestone, dung, and other articles of manure, without taking out sufferance, transire, or let-pass. (Repealed by Customs Law Repeal Act 1825 (6 Geo. 4. c. 105))
Combination of Workmen Act 1796 (repealed)	36 Geo. 3. c. 111	18 May 1796
An act to prevent unlawful combinations of workmen employed in the paper manufactory. (Repealed by Combinations of Workmen Act 1825 (6 Geo. 4. c. 129))
Registry of Ships Act 1796 (repealed)	36 Geo. 3. c. 112	18 May 1796
An act for authorising his Majesty to order the registering, and the granting certificates of registry, to certain ships and vessels, the property of his Majesty's subjects, which had belonged to, or been in possession of, the enemy, and concerning which doubts have arisen whether they are entitled to be registered according to the existing laws in that behalf. (Repealed by Statute Law Revision Act 1871 (34 & 35 Vict. c. 116))
Importation (No. 2) Act 1796 (repealed)	36 Geo. 3. c. 113	18 May 1796
An act for allowing the importation of arrow root from the British plantations; and also of linseed cakes and rape cakes, from any foreign country, in British-built ships, owned, navigated, and registered according to law, without payment of duty. (Repealed by Statute Law Revision Act 1861 (24 & 25 Vict. c. 101))
Families of Militiamen, etc. Act 1796 (repealed)	36 Geo. 3. c. 114	18 May 1796
An act to explain and amend an act, passed in the thirty-third year of his present Majesty's reign, (Note: Families of Militiamen Act 1793 (33 Geo. 3. c. 8)) intituled, "An act to provide for the families of persons chosen by lot to serve in the militia of this kingdom, and of substitutes serving therein; and to explain and amend an act of parliament, passed in the twenty-sixth year of his present Majesty, (Note: Militia Act 1786 (26 Geo. 3. c. 107)) intituled, 'An act for amending and reducing into one act of parliament, the laws relating to the militia, in that part of Great Britain called England.'" (Repealed by Relief of Families of Militiamen Act 1803 (43 Geo. 3. c. 47))
Manning of the Navy Act 1796 (repealed)	36 Geo. 3. c. 115	18 May 1796
An act to enforce the due execution of an act, passed in the last session of parliament, intituled, "An act for raising a certain number of men, in the several counties in England, for the service of his Majesty's navy." (Note: Manning of the Navy Act 1795 (35 Geo. 3. c. 5)) (Repealed by Statute Law Revision Act 1871 (34 & 35 Vict. c. 116))
Militia Allowances Act 1796 (repealed)	36 Geo. 3. c. 116	18 May 1796
An act for making allowances in certain cases to subaltern officers of the militia, in time of peace. (Repealed by Statute Law Revision Act 1871 (34 & 35 Vict. c. 116))
Window Duties Act 1796 (repealed)	36 Geo. 3. c. 117	18 May 1796
An act to exempt dairies and rooms used solely for making, keeping, and drying cheese and butter, from the duties on windows and lights. (Repealed by House Tax Act 1803 (43 Geo. 3. c. 161))
Fish Act 1796 (repealed)	36 Geo. 3. c. 118	18 May 1796
An Act to authorise the sale of fish at Billingsgate by retail. (Repealed by Sea Fisheries Act 1868 (31 & 32 Vict. c. 45))
East India Merchants (Purchase of Land in City, etc.) Act 1796 (repealed)	36 Geo. 3. c. 119	18 May 1796
An act to enable the united company of merchants of England, trading to the East Indies to purchase certain houses and ground contiguous to the East India house, and to widen the north end of Lime-street. (Repealed by Statute Law (Repeals) Act 2008 (c. 12))
East India Company Act 1796 (repealed)	36 Geo. 3. c. 120	18 May 1796
An act to enable the East India company to perform an engagement entered into by them, with William Sabatier, gent, respecting the importation of cotton from the East Indies. (Repealed by Statute Law Revision Act 1871 (34 & 35 Vict. c. 116))
Whitby Harbour Act 1796 (repealed)	36 Geo. 3. c. 121	18 May 1796
An act for further continuing the duty of one farthing per chalder on coals, granted by an act passed in the first year of the reign of Queen Anne, (Note: Whitby Piers Act 1702 (1 Ann. c. 13)) and revived and continued by two acts, passed in the eighth year of the reign of King George the Second, (Note: Whitby Harbour Act 1734 (8 Geo. 2. c. 10)) and in the sixth year of the reign of his present Majesty, (Note: Whitby Harbour Act 1766 (6 Geo. 3. c. 81)) for improving and repairing the piers and harbour of Whitby, in the county of York. (Repealed by Whitby Piers and Harbour Act 1827 (7 & 8 Geo. 4. c. lxxviii))
National Debt (No. 3) Act 1796 (repealed)	36 Geo. 3. c. 122	19 May 1796
An act for granting annuities to satisfy certain navy, victualling, and transport bills. (Repealed by Statute Law Revision Act 1870 (33 & 34 Vict. c. 69))
Duties on Wines, etc. Act 1796 (repealed)	36 Geo. 3. c. 123	19 May 1796
An act for granting to his Majesty additional duties on foreign wines and British sweets, and on foreign wines sold by auction. (Repealed by Statute Law Revision Act 1861 (24 & 25 Vict. c. 101))
Duties on Dogs Act 1796 (repealed)	36 Geo. 3. c. 124	19 May 1796
An act for granting to his Majesty certain duties on dogs. (Repealed by House Tax Act 1803 (43 Geo. 3. c. 161))
Duty on Hats Act 1796 (repealed)	36 Geo. 3. c. 125	19 May 1796
An Act for the better collection of duty on hats. (Repealed by Statute Law Revision Act 1861 (24 & 25 Vict. c. 101))
Appropriation Act 1796 (repealed)	36 Geo. 3. c. 126	19 May 1796
An act for granting to his Majesty a certain sum of money out of the consolidated fund, for the service of the year one thousand seven hundred and ninety-six; and for further appropriating the supplies granted in this session of parliament. (Repealed by Statute Law Revision Act 1871 (34 & 35 Vict. c. 116))
East India Merchants (Land for Warehouses etc.) Act 1796 (repealed)	36 Geo. 3. c. 127	19 May 1796
An act for enabling the united company of merchants of England trading to the East Indies, to purchase ground for warehouses upon, and to make a new street from Petticoat lane to White street, instead of Gravel lane in Petticoat lane. (Repealed by Statute Law (Repeals) Act 2008 (c. 12))
Farnborough and Sevenoaks Road Act 1796 (repealed)	36 Geo. 3. c. 128	18 December 1795
An act to continue the term of two acts passed in the twenty-second year of the reign of King George the Second, (Note: Farnborough and Sevenoaks Road Act 1748 (22 Geo. 2. c. 4)) and the thirteenth year of his present Majesty, (Note: Farnborough and Sevenoaks Road Act 1773 (13 Geo. 3. c. 92)) for repairing and widening the road leading from The Well, at the north west end of the town or village of Farnborough, (Note: Farnborough, Kent.) in the county of Kent, to a place called Riverhill, in the parish of Sevenoaks, (Note: Sevenoaks, Kent.) in the said county. (Repealed by Farnborough and Sevenoaks Road Act 1816 (56 Geo. 3. c. xxxiv))
Wadesmill and Royston Road Act 1796 (repealed)	36 Geo. 3. c. 129	18 December 1795
An act for enlarging the term and powers of three acts of the sixth (Note: Hertfordshire Roads Act 1732 (6 Geo. 2. c. 24)) and sixteenth (Note: Hertfordshire Roads Act 1742 (16 Geo. 2. c. 16)) years of his late Majesty, and the second year of his present Majesty, (Note: Hertford Roads Act 1762 (2 Geo. 3. c. 48)) for repairing the roads leading from Wades Mill in the county of Hertford, to Barley and Royston, in the said county. (Repealed by Roads from Wadesmill to Barley and Royston Act 1821 (1 & 2 Geo. 4. c. xvii) and Annual Turnpike Acts Continuance Act 1872 (35 & 36 Vict. c. 85))
North Shields to Newcastle Road Act 1796 (repealed)	36 Geo. 3. c. 130	24 December 1795
An act for continuing the term of certain acts for repairing the road from North Shields in the county of Northumberland, to the town of Newcastle upon Tyne. (Repealed by Road from North Shields to Newcastle-upon-Tyne Act 1831 (1 & 2 Will. 4. c. lxxii))
Dean Forest Roads Act 1796 (repealed)	36 Geo. 3. c. 131	24 December 1795
An act for amending, widening, improving, and keeping in repair, several roads in and through his Majesty's forest of Dean, and the waste lands thereto belonging, in the county of Gloucester, and for turning, altering, and changing the course of the said roads, and for making several new roads in the said forest to lead to certain places in and near the same; and also for amending, widening, and keeping in repair, certain roads leading from the said forest to and through several parts of the parish of Newland, adjoining the said forest, and also leading from the bottom of a place called The Viney Hill in the said forest, to and through certain parts of the parishes of Lidney and Awre, adjoining the said forest, in the said county of Gloucester. (Repealed by Forest of Dean Roads Act 1817 (57 Geo. 3. c. lxvi), Forest of Dean Roads Act 1827 (7 & 8 Geo. 4. c. xii) and Forest of Dean Roads Act 1838 (1 & 2 Vict. c. xxxviii))
Kincardine (County) Roads Act 1796 (repealed)	36 Geo. 3. c. 132	7 March 1796
An act for making and repairing the roads from the bridge of Dee southward, through the county of Kincardine, to or near to the town of Stonehaven, and from thence by Inverbervie and by Laurence Kirk, to the lower and upper bridges over the river Northesk; and for making effectual the statute labour in the said county, and levying conversion money in lieu of labour in certain cases, and otherwise regulating, making, and repairing, high roads and bridges in the said county of Kinkardine. (Repealed by Roads in Kincardine Act 1817 (57 Geo. 3. c. lii))
Coventry Roads Act 1796 (repealed)	36 Geo. 3. c. 133	7 March 1796
An act for enlarging the term and powers of two acts, passed in the twenty-seventh year of the reign of his late majesty King George the Second, (Note: Leicester and Warwick Roads Act 1754 (27 Geo. 2. c. 42)) and in the sixteenth year of the reign of his present Majesty, (Note: Leicester Roads Act 1776 (16 Geo. 3. c. 81)) for repairing the road from the city of Coventry to Warwick, and from Coventry to Martyn's Gutter, (Note: Martyn's Gutter is a stream, also known as Mardon Sich, which formed the boundary between the parishes of Stivichall and Stoneleigh. 52°22′45″N 1°30′56″W) and also several other roads therein mentioned, so far as the said acts relate to the said road from Coventry to Warwick, and from Coventry to Martyn's Gutter. (Repealed by Coventry Roads Act 1817 (57 Geo. 3. c. iv))
Perth and Queensferry Roads Act 1796 (repealed)	36 Geo. 3. c. 134	7 March 1796
An act for continuing and enlarging the term and powers of two acts made in the twenty-sixth year of the reign of his late majesty King George the Second, (Note: Perth Roads Act 1753 (26 Geo. 2. c. 91)) and the twelfth year of his present Majesty, (Note: Fife Roads Act 1772 (12 Geo. 3. c. 83)) in as far as respects the road from North Queensferry, in the county of Fife, to the town of Perth, and more effectually making, repairing, and keeping in repair, the said road and the landing places at the Queensferry. (Repealed by Road from North Queensferry to Perth Act 1809 (49 Geo. 3. c. xxxi))
Southampton Portsmouth and Sheet Bridge Roads Act 1796 (repealed)	36 Geo. 3. c. 135	7 March 1796
An act to continue the term and powers of an act passed in the twelfth year of the reign of his present majesty King George the Third, (Note: Southampton Roads Act 1772 (12 Geo. 3. c. 108)) for repairing, altering, and keeping in repair, the roads from Sheet Bridge to Portsmouth, and from Petersfield, to the Alton turnpike road, near Rapley, in the county of Southampton. (Repealed by Sheetbridge and Portsmouth Roads Act 1825 (6 Geo. 4. c. lxxxvii))
Wearmouth and Tyne Bridge Road Act 1796 (repealed)	36 Geo. 3. c. 136	7 March 1796
An act for making and maintaining a convenient carriage road from Wearmouth Bridge to Tyne Bridge, with a branch from the said road to the town of South Shields, all in the county of Durham. (Repealed by Wearmouth Bridge and Tyne Bridge Road Act 1818 (58 Geo. 3. c. xxix) and Wearmouth Bridge and Tyne Bridge Road Act 1839 (2 & 3 Vict. c. xxii))
Blackburn and Addingham Road Act 1796 (repealed)	36 Geo. 3. c. 137	7 March 1796
An act for more effectually repairing the road from Colne to Blackburn, in the county of Lancaster. (Repealed by Blackburn, Addingham and Cocking End Road Act 1810 (50 Geo. 3. c. xxxvi))
Leeds and Harrogate Road Act 1796 (repealed)	36 Geo. 3. c. 138	7 March 1796
An act for continuing the term, and altering and enlarging the powers of three several acts, passed in the twenty-fifth (Note: Yorkshire Roads (No. 3) Act 1751 (25 Geo. 2. c. 58)) and twenty-ninth (Note: Yorkshire Roads Act 1756 (29 Geo. 2. c. 71)) years of the reign of his late majesty King George the Second, and the seventeenth year of the reign of his present Majesty, (Note: Yorks Roads (No. 3) Act 1777 (17 Geo. 3. c. 78)) for repairing certain roads therein mentioned, so far as the same acts relate to the road from the town of Leeds, through Harwood, to the south-west corner of the inclosures of Harrowgate, in the west riding of the county of York. (Repealed by Road from Leeds to Harrogate Act 1839 (2 & 3 Vict. c. xxxii))
Perth Roads Act 1796 (repealed)	36 Geo. 3. c. 139	7 March 1796
An act for amending and rendering more effectual two acts, made in the twenty-ninth (Note: Perth Roads Act 1789 (29 Geo. 3. c. 17)) and thirty-third (Note: Perth Roads Act 1793 (33 Geo. 3. c. 158)) years of the reign of his present Majesty, for repairing certain roads in the county of Perth. (Repealed by Roads and Bridges in Perthshire Act 1811 (51 Geo. 3. c. cxcviii))
Slough Roads Act 1796 (repealed)	36 Geo. 3. c. 140	24 March 1796
An act to enlarge the term and powers of three acts passed in the thirteenth year of King George the First, (Note: Cranford to Maidenhead Road Act 1726 (13 Geo. 1. c. 31)) the seventeenth year of King George the Second, (Note: Maidenhead Road Act 1743 (17 Geo. 2. c. 19)) and the seventh year of his present Majesty, (Note: Bucks Roads Act 1766 (7 Geo. 3. c. 61)) for repairing the road from Cranford Bridge, in the county of Middlesex, to that end of Maidenhead Bridge, which lies in the county of Bucks, and for amending the road from Slough to a certain place in Eton, and from Langley Broom to Datchet Bridge, in the county of Buckingham. (Repealed by Cranford Bridge and Maidenhead, Slough and Eton Roads Act 1809 (49 Geo. 3. c. lvii) and Cranford Bridge and Maidenhead Bridge Road Act 1826 (7 Geo. 4. c. cxxxii))
Old Stratford and Dunchurch Road Act 1796 (repealed)	36 Geo. 3. c. 141	24 March 1796
An act for enlarging the term of an act made in the fifteenth year of his present Majesty, (Note: Old Stratford to Dunchurch Road Act 1775 (15 Geo. 3. c. 73)) for repairing the road from Old Stratford in the county of Northampton, to Dunchurch in the county of Warwick. (Repealed by Old Stratford and Dunchurch Road Act 1822 (3 Geo. 4. c. xci), Annual Turnpike Acts Continuance Act 1875 (38 & 39 Vict. c. cxciv) and Statute Law (Repeals) Act 2013 (c. 2))
Little Yarmouth and Blytheburgh Road Act 1796 (repealed)	36 Geo. 3. c. 142	24 March 1796
An act for amending and keeping in repair the road from the turnpike road in Little Yarmouth to the turnpike road at Blythburgh, and also the road from Brampton to Halesworth, in the county of Suffolk. (Repealed by Little Yarmouth and Blythburgh, and Brampton and Halesworth Roads Act 1832 (2 & 3 Will. 4. c. liii))
Crossford Bridge and Altrincham Road Act 1796 (repealed)	36 Geo. 3. c. 143	24 March 1796
An act for repairing and amending the road leading from Crossford Bridge within Stretford, in the county palatine of Lancaster, to Altrincham in the county palatine of Chester. (Repealed by Road from Crossford Bridge to Altrincham (Cheshire) Act 1827 (7 & 8 Geo. 4. c. xcv))
Blackburn Roads Act 1796 (repealed)	36 Geo. 3. c. 144	24 March 1796
An act for continuing the term and altering and enlarging the powers of an act, passed in the sixteenth year of the reign of his present Majesty, intituled, "An act for repairing and widening the road from the market cross in the township of Clitheroe, to Salford Bridge in the town of Blackburne, in the county palatine of Lancaster." (Note: Blackburn Roads Act 1776 (16 Geo. 3. c. 75)) (Repealed by Road from Clitheroe to Blackburn Act 1808 (48 Geo. 3. c. xxxiii) and Road from Clitheroe to Blackburn Act 1819 (59 Geo. 3. c. li))
Altrincham and Warrington Roads Act 1796 (repealed)	36 Geo. 3. c. 145	24 March 1796
An act for enlarging the term and powers of two several acts, passed in the twenty-sixth year of the reign of his late majesty King George the Second, (Note: Cheshire Roads Act 1753 (26 Geo. 2. c. 62)) and in the fourteenth year of the reign of his present Majesty, (Note: Cheshire Roads Act 1774 (14 Geo. 3. c. 100)) for repairing and widening the roads from Henshall's Smithy upon Cranage Green, through the town of Nether Knutsford, and by the south guide post in Mere and Bucklow Hill, to the town of Altrincham, in the county palatine of Chester, and from the said guide post to Warrington in the county of Lancaster, and from Bucklow Hill aforesaid to Penny's Lane near Northwich in the said county of Chester. (Repealed by Road from Cranage Green to Altrincham Act 1820 (1 Geo. 4. c. xxv))
Wolverhampton Roads Act 1796 (repealed)	36 Geo. 3. c. 146	26 April 1796
An act for enlarging the term and powers of certain acts of parliament, made for repairing the several roads in the counties of Stafford, Worcester, and Warwick, so far as relates to the road leading from a place called Streetway in the county of Stafford, though Wolverhampton to Wordsley Green Gate, and other roads therein mentioned. (Repealed by Dudley, Birmingham, Wolverhampton and Streetway District Roads Act 1829 (10 Geo. 4. c. lxxix))
Bala and Dolgelly Roads Act 1796 (repealed)	36 Geo. 3. c. 147	26 April 1796
An act for continuing and enlarging the term and powers of an act, passed in the seventeenth year of his present Majesty's reign, (Note: Merioneth, Montgomery, Denbigh and Salop Roads Act 1777 (17 Geo. 3. c. 100)) for repairing and widening several roads leading to and from the towns of Bala and Dolgelley, in the county of Merioneth, and other roads therein mentioned, in the counties of Montgomery, Denbigh, and Salop, and for repairing several other roads in the counties of Merioneth and Denbigh. (Repealed by Roads in Merioneth, Montgomery, Denbigh and Salop Act 1819 (59 Geo. 3. c. xcviii) and Llanrwst Roads Act 1837 (7 Will. 4 & 1 Vict. c. xxxv))
Macclesfield and Congleton Road Act 1796 (repealed)	36 Geo. 3. c. 148	26 April 1796
An act for altering, widening, improving, and keeping in repair, the road leading from Macclesfield, by Broken Cross, to Congleton, all in the county palatine of Chester. (Repealed by Macclesfield to Congleton Road Act 1817 (57 Geo. 3. c. lxxv) and Macclesfield to Congleton Road Act 1840 (3 & 4 Vict. c. xxxii))
Bolton and St. Helens Road Act 1796 (repealed)	36 Geo. 3. c. 149	14 May 1796
An act for continuing the term, and altering and enlarging the powers of an act, passed in the twenty-eighth year of the reign of his present Majesty, intituled, "An act for enlarging the term of an act made in the second year of the reign of his present Majesty, for repairing and widening the roads from a certain place near Bolton in the Moors, to Leigh, and thence to the guide post near Golbourne Dale, and to the south end of Newton Bridge, and from the said guide post to Winwick, and from Newton, by Parr Stocks, to the guide post in Parr, in the county palatine of Lancaster, and for making more effectual provision for repairing and widening the said roads, except from the said guide post near Golbourne Dale to Winwick." (Note: Lancaster Roads Act 1788 (28 Geo. 3. c. 113)) (Repealed by Bolton-le-Moors and Parr Roads Act 1829 (10 Geo. 4. c. lxxxv))
Nottinghamshire Roads Act 1796 (repealed)	36 Geo. 3. c. 150	14 May 1796
An act to enlarge the term and powers of an act, passed in the fourteenth year of the reign of his present Majesty, intituled, "An act for repairing and widening the several roads near the towns of Hockerton, Kirklington, Southwell, Normanton, and Winkbourne, in the county of Nottingham," (Note: Notts Roads Act 1774 (14 Geo. 3. c. 101)) and for amending, widening, and keeping in repair, the road branching out of one of the said roads, in the village of Kirklington, to the Street Gate road, and the Newark and Southwell turnpike road at Great Bridge, all in the county of Nottingham. (Repealed by Roads near Hockerton (Nottinghamshire) Act 1818 (58 Geo. 3. c. vii) and Annual Turnpike Acts Continuance Act 1873 (36 & 37 Vict. c. 90))
Bedford and Woburn Road Act 1796 (repealed)	36 Geo. 3. c. 151	18 May 1796
An act to continue the term and alter and enlarge the powers of an act passed in the seventeenth year of the reign of his present Majesty, intituled, "An act for repairing and widening the road from Stall Gate Close, at the south west end of the town of Bedford, to the town of Ampthill, and from the said town of Ampthill, to Wobourn Park, in the county of Bedford, and also the road branching out of the same, in Kempton Field, to the turnpike road leading from Hitchin to the said town of Bedford," (Note: Bedford Roads Act 1777 (17 Geo. 3. c. 94)) except so far as the same relates to the road leading from the south end of Ridgemont Town to the entrance of Woburn Park, at a place called The Red Lodges; and for making and maintaining a road from the south end of Ridgemont Town aforesaid through Husborn Crawley, to the north end of the town of Woburn, and for discontinuing the said part of the said road leading from the south end of Ridgemont to The Red Lodges aforesaid, and also for discontinuing the highway from thence, through the said park, to where it joins the road leading from Woburn to Eversholt, all in the said county of Bedford. (Repealed by Bedford and Woburn Road Act 1840 (3 & 4 Vict. c. c))
Nottingham Roads Act 1796	36 Geo. 3. c. 152	19 May 1796
An act for raising, maintaining, and keeping in repair, the road from the north end of the bridge, commonly called The Old Trent Bridge, to the west end of Saint Mary's church yard, by way of Hollow Stone, in the parish of Saint Mary, in the town of Nottingham, and for erecting and maintaining such and so many flood bridges upon the said road as may be necessary to carry off the flood water, and for widening and improving the entrance into the town of Nottingham by way of Hollow Stone.

=== Private acts ===
Short title	Citation	Royal assent
Long title
Rich's Estate Act 1796	36 Geo. 3. c. 7 Pr.	7 March 1796
An act to exonerate the estate of sir Charles Rich baronet, and dame Mary Frances his wife, situate in the county of Surrey, from certain annuities, or annual sums, payable during the life and for the benefit of sir George Rich baronet, upon the terms therein mentioned.
Alvescot Inclosure Act 1796	36 Geo. 3. c. 8 Pr.	7 March 1796
An act for dividing, allotting, and inclosing, the common fields, common meadows, common pastures, downs, and all other commonable lands, within the manor and parish of Alvescot, in the county of Oxford.
Awre Inclosure Act 1796	36 Geo. 3. c. 9 Pr.	7 March 1796
An act for dividing and inclosing the open and common fields, common meadows, common pastures, waste, and other commonable lands, within the tything of Awre, in the parish of Awre, in the county of Gloucester.
Reymerstone, Letton, &c. Inclosure Act 1796	36 Geo. 3. c. 10 Pr.	7 March 1796
An act for dividing, allotting, and inclosing, certain commons and waste lands, and open fields, within the several parishes of Reymerstone, Letton, Cranworth, and Southbergh, alias Barrow, in the county of Norfolk.
Dunton Bassett Inclosure Act 1796	36 Geo. 3. c. 11 Pr.	7 March 1796
An act for dividing, allotting, and inclosing, the open and common fields, meadows, and other commonable grounds and places, of and within the parish, lordship, and liberties of Dunton Basset, in the county of Leicester.
Great Woolstone Inclosure Act 1796	36 Geo. 3. c. 12 Pr.	7 March 1796
An act for dividing and inclosing the open and common fields, common pastures, common meadows, and other commonable lands and grounds, in the parish of Great Woolstone, in the county of Buckingham.
Rothwell Haigh Inclosure Act 1796	36 Geo. 3. c. 13 Pr.	7 March 1796
An act to obviate a doubt touching the validity of certain parts of an award, made in pursuance of an act of the twenty-fifth year of his present Majesty, for dividing and inclosing a certain open tract of land, called Rothwell Haigh, within Rothwell, in the west riding of the county of York.
Northwold Inclosure Act 1796	36 Geo. 3. c. 14 Pr.	7 March 1796
An act for dividing, allotting, and inclosing the common fields, whole year lands, half year lands, commons, fen grounds, and waste lands, within the parish of Northwold, in the county of Norfolk.
Nether Wallop Inclosure Act 1796	36 Geo. 3. c. 15 Pr.	7 March 1796
An act for dividing, allotting, and inclosing, the open and common fields, common downs, waste lands, and other commonable places, in the parish of Nether Wallop, in the county of Southampton.
Basing and Mapplederwell Inclosure Act 1796	36 Geo. 3. c. 16 Pr.	7 March 1796
An act for dividing, allotting, and inclosing, the open and common fields, waste lands, moors, and other commonable places, within the several parishes of Basing and Mapplederwell, in the county of Southampton.
Kedewen, Hopton, &c. Inclosure Act 1796	36 Geo. 3. c. 17 Pr.	7 March 1796
An act for dividing and inclosing the commonable lands and waste grounds within the manors of Kedewen, Hopton, and Overgorther, in the county of Montgomery.
Lubbren's Naturalization Act 1796	36 Geo. 3. c. 18 Pr.	7 March 1796
An act for naturalizing John Diederich Lubbren.
Gordon's Naturalization Act 1796	36 Geo. 3. c. 19 Pr.	7 March 1796
An act for naturalizing Maria Gordon, otherwise Allan, spiniter.
Rebenack's Naturalization Act 1796	36 Geo. 3. c. 20 Pr.	7 March 1796
An act for naturalizing John Frederick Rebenack.
Corthym's Naturalization Act 1796	36 Geo. 3. c. 21 Pr.	7 March 1796
An act for naturalizing Henry Augustus Corthym.
Runkel's Naturalization Act 1796	36 Geo. 3. c. 22 Pr.	7 March 1796
An act for naturalizing John Juftus Runkel.
Reimer's Naturalization Act 1796	36 Geo. 3. c. 23 Pr.	7 March 1796
An act for naturalizing Henry Christian Reimer.
Earl Temple's Estate Act 1796	36 Geo. 3. c. 24 Pr.	24 March 1796
An act to enable the right honourable Richard Grenville Nugent Temple, commonly called Earl Temple, and the right honourable Anna Eliza Brydges, spinster, commonly called Lady Anna Eliza Brydges, to make settlements on the marriage in tended between them, notwithstanding their respective minorities.
Honeywood's Estate Act 1796	36 Geo. 3. c. 25 Pr.	24 March 1796
An act for enabling the trustees for sale of certain estates of sir John Honywood baronet, which stood settled on him as tenant for life, unimpeachable for waste, to sell the same estates with the timber and underwood standing, and for allowing him to receive the amount of such timber and underwood at a fair valuation, and for debarring him from falling timber, or committing waste, on the lands hereafter to be purchased.
Elcombe and Uffcott Inclosure Act 1796	36 Geo. 3. c. 26 Pr.	24 March 1796
An act for dividing, allotting, and inclosing, certain open and common fields, common meadows, common pastures, common downs, and other commonable and waste lands, lying and being in that part of the manor of Elcombe which is situate within the parish of Wroughton, and within the tything of Uffcot, in the parish of Broad Hinton, in the county of Wilts.
Somersham Heath Inclosure Act 1796	36 Geo. 3. c. 27 Pr.	24 March 1796
An act for dividing a certain heath, called Somersham Heath, in the county of Huntingdon, and for dividing and inclosing such parts of the said heath as shall be allotted to the parishes of Woodhurst, Somersham, and Pidley with Fenton, and also the open fields and commonable lands within the said parishes.
Kimberworth Inclosure Act 1796	36 Geo. 3. c. 28 Pr.	24 March 1796
An act for dividing and inclosing the common fields, undivided inclosures, commons, and waste grounds, within the township of Kimberworth, in the parish of Rotheram, in the west riding of the county of York.
King's Sedgemoor Inclosure Act 1796	36 Geo. 3. c. 29 Pr.	24 March 1796
An act for dividing, allotting, and inclosing, a certain parcel or tract of commonable ground, formerly part of King's Sedgmoor, lying in the parish of Butleigh, in the county of Somerset.
Woolavington Inclosure Act 1796	36 Geo. 3. c. 30 Pr.	24 March 1796
An act for dividing and allotting the open and commonable pastures, and for exchanging, allotting, and improving, the open and commonable arable lands, within the parish of Woollavington, in the county of Somerset.
Tysoe Inclosure Act 1796	36 Geo. 3. c. 31 Pr.	24 March 1796
An act for dividing and inclosing the open and common fields, and common or commonable meadows, pastures, lands, and grounds, and common or waste land, within the parish of Tysoe, in the county of Warwick.
Cheswardine Inclosure Act 1796	36 Geo. 3. c. 32 Pr.	24 March 1796
An act for dividing, allotting, and inclosing, the commons and waste lands, within the parish of Cheswardine, in the county of Salop.
Gateford and Shireoaks Inclosure Act 1796	36 Geo. 3. c. 33 Pr.	24 March 1796
An act for dividing and inclosing the open fields, commons, and waste grounds, within the townships of Gateford and Shireoaks, in the parish of Worksop, in the county of Nottingham.
Beighton Inclosure Act 1796	36 Geo. 3. c. 34 Pr.	24 March 1796
An act for dividing and inclosing the commons and waste lands, within the manor and parish of Beighton, in the county of Derby.
Blunham and Northill Inclosure Act 1796	36 Geo. 3. c. 35 Pr.	24 March 1796
An act for dividing and inclosing the several open and common fields, meadows, pastures, waste lands, and other commonable lands and grounds, in the parishes of Blunham and Northill, in the county of Bedford.
Granborough Inclosure Act 1796	36 Geo. 3. c. 36 Pr.	24 March 1796
An act for dividing and inclosing the open and common fields, common meadows, common pastures, and other commonable lands and grounds, within the parish of Grandborough, in the county of Buckingham.
Macclesfield Inclosure Act 1796	36 Geo. 3. c. 37 Pr.	24 March 1796
An act for dividing, allotting, and inclosing, the com mons and waste grounds within the manor and borough of Macclesfield in the county of Chester.
Little Brickhill Inclosure Act 1796	36 Geo. 3. c. 38 Pr.	24 March 1796
An act for dividing, inclosing, and allotting, the open and common fields, common meadows, common pastures, lammas grounds, waste lands, and other commonable lands and grounds, in the parish of Little Brickhill, in the county of Bucks.
Cumwhitton and Cumrew Inclosure Act 1796	36 Geo. 3. c. 39 Pr.	24 March 1796
An act for dividing and inclosing the moors, commons, and waste grounds, in the manors and parishes of Cumwhitton and Cumrew, within and parcel of the barony of Gilsland, in the county of Cumberland.
Thornton, Farmanby, &c. Inclosure Act 1796	36 Geo. 3. c. 40 Pr.	24 March 1796
An act for dividing and inclosing the commons and waste grounds in the several townships of Thornton, Farmanby, Ellerburn, and Kingthorp, within the parishes of Thornton, Ellerburn, and Pickering, in the north riding of the county of York, and for making a compensation in lieu of the tythes thereof, and of ancient inclosed lands in the same townships.
Balsall Inclosure Act 1796	36 Geo. 3. c. 41 Pr.	24 March 1796
An act for dividing, allotting, and inclosing, the several commons and waste lands, within the manor and hamlet of Balsall, in the parish of Hampton in Arden, in the county of Warwick.
Sneinton Inclosure Act 1796	36 Geo. 3. c. 42 Pr.	24 March 1796
An act for dividing, allotting, and inclosing the open fields, meadows, pastures, commons, and waste lands, within the parish of Snenton in the county of Nottingham.
Barton Mills Inclosure Act 1796	36 Geo. 3. c. 43 Pr.	24 March 1796
An act for dividing, allotting, and inclosing, the whole year or every year lands, half year, and other commonable lands and grounds, within the parish of Little Barton, otherwise Barton Mills, in the county of Suffolk.
Norton Inclosure Act 1796	36 Geo. 3. c. 44 Pr.	24 March 1796
An act for dividing and inclosing the open and common fields, meadows, pastures, waste lands, and other commonable lands and grounds, in the parish of Norton, in the county of Hertford.
Pertenhall Inclosure Act 1796	36 Geo. 3. c. 45 Pr.	24 March 1796
An act for dividing and inclosing the common and open fields, meadows, commonable lands, and waste grounds, in the parish of Pertenhall, in the county of Bedford.
Hibaldstow Inclosure Act 1796	36 Geo. 3. c. 46 Pr.	24 March 1796
An act for dividing and inclosing the open common fields, meadows, pastures, leys, and other commonable lands and waste grounds, in the lordship of Hibalstowe, in the county of Lincoln.
Mullins's Divorce Act 1796	36 Geo. 3. c. 47 Pr.	24 March 1796
An act to dissolve the marriage of William Townsend Mullins esquire, with Frances Elizabeth Sage his now wife, and to enable him to marry again, and for other purposes therein mentioned.
Mitchel's Naturalization Act 1796	36 Geo. 3. c. 48 Pr.	24 March 1796
An act for naturalizing David Mitchel.
Garrels' Naturalization Act 1796	36 Geo. 3. c. 49 Pr.	24 March 1796
An act for naturalizing Herman Jacob Garrels.
Egerton's Estate Act 1796	36 Geo. 3. c. 50 Pr.	26 April 1796
An act for carrying into execution an agreement entered into by William Egerton esquire, for the sale of the sum of twenty thousand pounds, and interest, advanced upon an assignment of the Chester canal navigation, with its appurtenances, together with the said security for the same, and to enable the trustees appointed by the will of Samuel Egerton esquire, deceased, to convey and dispose of the said sums and security, and to lay out the money arising from the sale thereof upon the trusts of the said will.
Barrett's Exchange Act 1796	36 Geo. 3. c. 51 Pr.	26 April 1796
An act for effectuating an exchange of certain lands in the several parishes of Ickham, in the county of Kent, and Saint Margaret, in the city of Canterbury, between the guardians of the poor of the city of Canterbury and Thomas Barret, of Lee in the county of Kent, esquire.
Madden's and Leslie's, &c. Estate Act 1796	36 Geo. 3. c. 52 Pr.	26 April 1796
An act for effectuating a partition of certain estates in the county of Leicester belonging to Samuel Madden esquire, and Catherine his wife, and Charles Leslie the younger, esquire, and Ann his wife, in their own rights, and to Samuel Pipe Walferstan esquire, and John Moore clerk, as trustees under the wills of Alicia Dorothea Charnel, and Anna Maria Charnel spinsters, both deceased, and for other purposes.
Elliott's Estate Act 1796	36 Geo. 3. c. 53 Pr.	26 April 1796
An act to enable and empower trustees to sell certain copyhold estates belonging to Catherine Dallman Elliott, an infant, and to lay out the money arising from the sale thereof in the purchase of other lands and hereditaments, to be settled to the use of the said infant.
Wilkinson's Estate Act 1796	36 Geo. 3. c. 54 Pr.	26 April 1796
An act for vesting the real estates devised by the will of John Wilkinson, late of Whitby in the county of York, esquire, deceased, in trustees, in trust, to be sold, and for applying the money arising therefrom, or a sufficient part thereof, in discharge of his debts affecting the same estates, in aid of his personal estate, and for placing out at interest the residue thereof, under the direction of the court of chancery, upon the trusts declared by the said will of such real estate.
Sir John Sheffield's Estate Act 1796	36 Geo. 3. c. 55 Pr.	26 April 1796
An act for vesting certain manors, messuages, farms, lands, tenements, and hereditaments, situate within Weardley, Eccup, and Harewood, in the west riding of the county of York, (part of the settled estates of sir John Sheffield baronet), in Edward Lascelles the elder, esquire, for his life, with certain remainders over, discharged of and from the several uses, entail, and trusts, to which the same now stand limited, and for settling the manor or reputed manor of Eccup, and divers messuages, lands, and hereditaments, within Eccup, Addle, Cookeridge, East Breary, and West Breary, in the said county of York, and also divers messuages, lands, and hereditaments, in the county of Lincoln, respectively, belonging to the said Edward Lascelles the elder and Edward Lascelles the younger, of much greater value in lieu thereof, and by way of exchange to the like uses, entail and trusts.
Leacroft's Estate Act 1796	36 Geo. 3. c. 56 Pr.	26 April 1796
An act for effectuating a partition of the estates of Thomas Leacroft esquire, and John Leacroft gentleman, in the lordship or liberty of Litchurch, in the county of Derby.
Medows's Estate Act 1796	36 Geo. 3. c. 57 Pr.	26 April 1796
An act to enable Evelyn Philip Medows esquire, and others after his death, to grant building leases of certain estates in the parish of Whitechapel, in the county of Middlesex.
Swale's Estate Act 1796	36 Geo. 3. c. 58 Pr.	26 April 1796
An act for vesting the estates in the county of Cambridge, devised by John Swale esquire, in trustees, to be sold at the same time with certain estates of John Swale esquire, the son, and for applying part of the monies to arise from the sale of the first mentioned estates in discharging legacies, and for laying out the residue in the purchase of estates to be settled to the same uses.
Lyth Rectory Act 1796	36 Geo. 3. c. 59 Pr.	26 April 1796
An act for vesting the rectory of Lyth in trustees, for the purpose of completing the sale thereof.
Forest of Rockingham Act 1796	36 Geo. 3. c. 60 Pr.	26 April 1796
An act for setting out lands in lieu of, and compensation for, the rights of common in or upon the woodlands, and other lands and grounds, in the bailiwick of Clive, otherwise Cliffe, in the forest of Rockingham, in the county of Northampton, and for extinguishing such common rights.
Barrington Inclosure Act 1796	36 Geo. 3. c. 61 Pr.	26 April 1796
An act for dividing and allotting the common and open fields, meadows, commonable lands, and waste grounds, within the parish of Barrington, in the county of Cambridge.
Ridgmont Inclosure Act 1796	36 Geo. 3. c. 62 Pr.	26 April 1796
An act for dividing and inclosing the common and open fields, common meadows, commons, and waste lands, within the parish of Ridgemont, in the county of Bedford.
Houghton Regis Inclosure Act 1796	36 Geo. 3. c. 63 Pr.	26 April 1796
An act for dividing and allotting the common and open fields, common meadows, commons, and waste lands, within the parish of Houghton Regis, in the county of Bedford.
Cartmel Inclosure Act 1796	36 Geo. 3. c. 64 Pr.	26 April 1796
An act for improving, dividing, and inclosing, the commons, waste grounds, and mosses, in the parish of Cartmel, in the county palatine of Lancaster.
Maulden Inclosure Act 1796	36 Geo. 3. c. 65 Pr.	26 April 1796
An act for dividing and inclosing the open and common fields, common meadows, commonable lands, commons, and waste grounds, within the parish of Maulden, in the county of Bedford.
Sherington Inclosure Act 1796	36 Geo. 3. c. 66 Pr.	26 April 1796
An act for dividing and inclosing the open and common fields, meadows lands, commons, and commonable places, in the parish of Sherington, in the county of Buckingham.
Walcote Inclosure Act 1796	36 Geo. 3. c. 67 Pr.	26 April 1796
An act for dividing, allotting, and inclosing, the open fields and commonable places of Walcott, in the parish of Misterton, in the county of Leicester.
Hull Inclosure Act 1796	36 Geo. 3. c. 68 Pr.	26 April 1796
An act for dividing, allotting, inclosing, and improving the open fields, common and waste grounds, within the several townships of West Ella, Kirk Ella, and Willerby in the county of the town of Kingston-upon-Hull, and within that part of Willerby, which lies in the county of York.
Ellough, Worlingham and North Cove Inclosure Act 1796	36 Geo. 3. c. 69 Pr.	26 April 1796
An act for dividing and inclosing the heaths, fen grounds, commons and waste lands, within the parishes of Ellough, Worlingham Saint Mary, otherwise Great Worlingham, Worlingham Saint Peter, otherwise Little Worlingham, and North Cove, in the county of Suffolk.
Mirfield Inclosure Act 1796	36 Geo. 3. c. 70 Pr.	26 April 1796
An act for dividing and inclosing the commons, common fields, and other commonable lands and grounds, within the parish of Mirfield, in the county of York.
Marston Moretaine Inclosure Act 1796	36 Geo. 3. c. 71 Pr.	26 April 1796
An act for dividing and inclosing the open and common fields, and other commonable lands, within the parish of Marston Moretaine, in the county of Bedford.
Barnwood, &c. Inclosure Act 1796	36 Geo. 3. c. 72 Pr.	26 April 1796
An act for dividing, allotting, and inclosing, the open fields and meadows, commonable and intermixed lands and waste grounds, within the several parishes of Barnwood, Matson, Saint Mary de Lode, Saint Catherine, and Saint Michael, and within the south hamlet and vill of Wotton, all in the county of Gloucester.
Handley Inclosure Act 1796	36 Geo. 3. c. 73 Pr.	26 April 1796
An act for dividing and allotting the open and common arable fields, and extinguishing the right of pasturage upon a piece of land called Hayne's Close, within the parish of Hanley otherwise Handley, otherwise Sixpenny Hanley, in the county of Dorset.
Scredington Inclosure Act 1796	36 Geo. 3. c. 74 Pr.	26 April 1796
An act for dividing and inclosing the open fields, meadows, halfyear's land, commons, and waste grounds, within the manor and parish of Scredington, in the county of Lincoln.
Whitfield Inclosure Act 1796	36 Geo. 3. c. 75 Pr.	26 April 1796
An act for dividing and inclosing certain open common fields, wastes, and common ground, in the parish, liberties, and precincts of Whitfield, in the county of Northampton.
Hambleton Inclosure Act 1796	36 Geo. 3. c. 76 Pr.	26 April 1796
An act for dividing and inclosing the several open common fields, and other commonable lands and waste grounds, within the township of Hambleton, in the parish of Brayton, in the west riding of the county of York.
Shadwell's Divorce Act 1796	36 Geo. 3. c. 77 Pr.	26 April 1796
An act to dissolve the marriage of Lancelot Shadwell esquire, barrister at law, with Elizabeth Sophia Whitmore his now wife, and to enable him to marry again, and for other purposes therein mentioned.
Baron de Feilitzsch's Naturalization Act 1796	36 Geo. 3. c. 78 Pr.	26 April 1796
An act for naturalizing Frederick Lewis Ernest baron de Feilitzsch.
Leuven's Naturalization Act 1796	36 Geo. 3. c. 79 Pr.	26 April 1796
An act for naturalizing Arnold John Gevers Leuven.
Fawkes' Estate Act 1796	36 Geo. 3. c. 80 Pr.	14 May 1796
An act for vesting certain detached parts of the settled estates of Walter Fawkes esquire, in trustees, to be sold, and for laying out the money arising by sale thereof in the purchase of manors, or other hereditaments, lying nearer to and more convenient to be enjoyed with, the mansion house at Farnley Hall, and the bulk of the settled estates, to the like uses as such detached parts stand limited.
Vicar of Blackburn's Leases Act 1796	36 Geo. 3. c. 81 Pr.	14 May 1796
An act to enable the vicar of the parish of Blackburn, in the county of Lancaster, to grant a lease or leases, with powers of renewal, of part of the glebe lands belonging to the said vicarage.
Newnham's and Sir John Shelley's Exchange Act 1796	36 Geo. 3. c. 82 Pr.	14 May 1796
An act to enable trustees to convey part of the settled estates of John Newnham esquire, deceased, in the county of Sussex, unto sir John Shelley baronet, his heirs and assigns, in exchange for certain messuages and lands in the same county.
Hammond's Estate Act 1796	36 Geo. 3. c. 83 Pr.	14 May 1796
An act for vesting part of the settled estates of William Parker Hamond esquire, in the county of Middlesex, in trustees, to be sold, for discharging incumbrances, and for laying out the residue of the money arising by such sale in the purchase of other lands and hereditaments, to be settled to the same uses, and for enabling the said trustees, and the said William Parker Hamond, to grant leases of part of the said estates for the purpose of building.
Powell's Estate Act 1796	36 Geo. 3. c. 84 Pr.	14 May 1796
An act for making a partition and division of divers messuages, lands, and hereditaments, in the several counties of Carmarthen and Glamorgan, devised by the will of William Powell esquire, deceased, and now held in undivided moieties, and for settling and assuring the specific and entire messuages, lands, and hereditaments, which upon such partition, are respectively allotted to be held in severalty, for, or in lieu of, each of the said undivided moieties, to the several uses, and subject to the several charges and incumbrances now subsisting upon, or affecting, such undivided moieties respectively.
Mansell's Estate Act 1796	36 Geo. 3. c. 85 Pr.	14 May 1796
An act for vesting certain detached parts of the real estate late of sir Edward Vaughan Mansell baronet, deceased, situate in the county of Carmarthen, in trustees, in trust to be sold, and to apply the money, to arise from such sale, in the reduction of the several mortgages, or other incumbrances subsisting upon, or affecting, such real estate, and also for enabling such trustees to demise the mines, veins, or seams of coal, lying under the residue of such real estate, in such manner, and with such consent, as therein is mentioned.
Duke of Newcastle's Estate Act 1796	36 Geo. 3. c. 86 Pr.	14 May 1796
An act to impower the guardians of the most noble Henry duke of Newcastle, an infant, to charge his settled estates with certain sums of money for the purposes therein mentioned, and to grant building and other leases, and make exchanges or sales of certain parts of the said estates, and for other purposes.
Marquis of Hertford's, Lord Wm Gordon's, &c. Estates Act 1796	36 Geo. 3. c. 87 Pr.	14 May 1796
An act for confirming several purchases, conveyances, and settlements, made of the estates of the most honourable Francis marquis of Hertford and Isabella Ann marchioness of Hertford, his wife, lord William Gordon and Frances his wife, Hugo Meynell and Elizabeth his wife, Henry Hervey Aston and Harriot his wife, and sir John Ramsden and dame Louisa Susanna his wife.
Weston Inclosure Act 1796	36 Geo. 3. c. 88 Pr.	14 May 1796
An act for dividing and inclosing the open arable fields, pastures, meadows, commons, and waste grounds, within the parish of Weston, in the county of Nottingham.
Tilney and Islington Inclosure Act 1796	36 Geo. 3. c. 89 Pr.	14 May 1796
An act for dividing, allotting, and inclosing, the commons and waste lands within the several parishes of Tilney All Saints, Tilney Saint Lawrence, and Islington, in the county of Norfolk.
Twyford Inclosure Act 1796	36 Geo. 3. c. 90 Pr.	14 May 1796
An act for dividing, allotting, and inclosing, the open fields, meadow, pasture, and other commonable and waste lands, in the lordship or liberties of Twyford, in the county of Leicester.
Hampton Poyle Inclosure Act 1796	36 Geo. 3. c. 91 Pr.	14 May 1796
An act for dividing, allotting, and inclosing, the common fields, common meadows, common pastures, and all other commonable lands, within the parish of Hampton Poyle, in the county of Oxford.
Old Malton Inclosure Act 1796	36 Geo. 3. c. 92 Pr.	14 May 1796
An act for altering, varying, and amending an act, passed in the thirty-fourth year of the reign of his present Majesty, (Note: Old Malton Inclosure Act 1794 (34 Geo. 3. c. 47 Pr.)) for dividing, inclosing, draining, and improving, the open fields, ings, pastures, commons, and waste grounds, within the manor and parish of Old Malton, in the north riding of the county of York.
Farnworth and Kersley Inclosure Act 1796	36 Geo. 3. c. 93 Pr.	14 May 1796
An act for dividing, allotting, and inclosing, certain commons and waste lands within the manors or lordships of Farnworth and Kerley, in the parish of Dean, in the county palatine of Lancaster.
Tattershall, &c, Inclosure and Drainage Act 1796	36 Geo. 3. c. 94 Pr.	14 May 1796
An act for dividing and inclosing the open and common fields, marsh, meadow, and moor grounds, and other commonable and waste lands, in the parish of Tattershall and townships of Tattershall Thorpe, and Kirkby super Bane, in the county of Lincoln, and for more effectually embanking and draining the said marsh and meadow grounds, and certain other low lands and grounds, in the said parish of Tattershall, and township of Tattershall Thorpe, abutting on the river Witham and river Bane, in the said county of Lincoln.
Barwick-in-Elmet Inclosure Act 1796	36 Geo. 3. c. 95 Pr.	14 May 1796
An act for dividing and inclosing the several open fields, ings, commons, and waste grounds, within the parish of Barwick in Elmet, in the county of York.
Caistor Inclosure Act 1796	36 Geo. 3. c. 96 Pr.	14 May 1796
An act for dividing, allotting, and inclosing, the open and common fields, common pastures, and such other commonable lands and waste grounds, as are within, and solely belonging to, the lordship of Caistor, in the county of Lincoln.
Luddington and Garthorpe Inclosure Act 1796	36 Geo. 3. c. 97 Pr.	14 May 1796
An act for dividing, inclosing, and improving, all the open common fields, meadows, pasture lands, commons, and waste grounds, in the townships of Luddington and Garthorpe, in the parish of Luddington, in the county of Lincoln.
Gringley-on-the-Hill Inclosure Act 1796	36 Geo. 3. c. 98 Pr.	14 May 1796
An act for dividing, allotting, and inclosing, the open fields, meadows, commons, and waste grounds, within the parish of Gringley upon the Hill, in the county of Nottingham.
Sharrington Inclosure Act 1796	36 Geo. 3. c. 99 Pr.	14 May 1796
An act for dividing, allotting, and inclosing, the whole year lands, half year or shack lands, commons, and waste grounds, within the parish of Sharrington, in the county of Norfolk.
Ufford Inclosure Act 1796	36 Geo. 3. c. 100 Pr.	14 May 1796
An act to divide, allot, improve, and inclose, the open fields, meadows, commons, wastes, and heath grounds, and other open and uninclosed lands, in the parish of Ufford, with Ashton and Bainton, in the county of Northampton.
Stoke Rochford Inclosure Act 1796	36 Geo. 3. c. 101 Pr.	14 May 1796
An act for dividing allotting and inclosing the open fields, pastures, commons, and waste lands, within the parishes of North Stoke and South Stoke, otherwise Stoke Rochford, in the county of Lincoln.
Tarrington Inclosure Act 1796	36 Geo. 3. c. 102 Pr.	14 May 1796
An act for dividing, allotting, and inclosing, the open fields, meadows, and pastures, in the parish of Tarrington, in the county of Hereford.
East Bridgford Inclosure Act 1796	36 Geo. 3. c. 103 Pr.	14 May 1796
An act for dividing and inclosing the open arable fields, common pastures, commons, waste, and other uninclosed lands grounds, and within the manor or lordship, and parish of East Bridgford, in the county of Nottingham.
Farrer's Divorce Act 1796	36 Geo. 3. c. 104 Pr.	14 May 1796
An act to dissolve the marriage of Henry Farrer esquire, with Mary Goldsmith his now wife, and to enable him to marry again, and for other purposes therein mentioned.
Jones's Divorce Act 1796	36 Geo. 3. c. 105 Pr.	14 May 1796
An act to dissolve the marriage of the reverend William Brook Jones clerk, with Elizabeth his now wife, and to enable him to marry again, and for other purposes therein mentioned.
Moorsom's Divorce Act 1796	36 Geo. 3. c. 106 Pr.	14 May 1796
An act for dissolving the marriage of Richard Moorsom gentleman, with Elizabeth his now wife, late Elizabeth Clark, and for enabling him to marry again, and for other purposes therein mentioned.
Biscoe's Divorce Act 1796	36 Geo. 3. c. 107 Pr.	14 May 1796
An act to dissolve the marriage of Joseph Seymour Biscoe esquire, with Susanna Harriot Hope his now wife, and to enable him to marry again, and for other purposes therein mentioned.
Christie's Divorce Act 1796	36 Geo. 3. c. 108 Pr.	14 May 1796
An act to dissolve the marriage of James Christie esquire, with Elizabeth Leslie his now wife, and to enable him to marry again, and for other purposes therein mentioned.
Howard's Naturalization Act 1796	36 Geo. 3. c. 109 Pr.	14 May 1796
An act for naturalizing Robert Howard, John Howard, and Mary Thomas otherwise Mary Howard.
Bollmann's Naturalization Act 1796	36 Geo. 3. c. 110 Pr.	14 May 1796
An act for naturalizing Christian Henry Bollmann.
Bichner's Naturalization Act 1796	36 Geo. 3. c. 111 Pr.	14 May 1796
An act for naturalizing Otto Bichner.
Longcot Inclosure Act 1796	36 Geo. 3. c. 112 Pr.	18 May 1796
An act for dividing, allotting, and inclosing, the open common fields, common meadows, common pastures, and other commonable and waste lands and grounds, within the hamlet or township of Longcot, in the parish of Shrivenham, in the county of Berks.
Little Casterton Inclosure Act 1796	36 Geo. 3. c. 113 Pr.	18 May 1796
An act for dividing, allotting, and inclosing, the open and common fields, meadows, pastures, commonable lands, and waste grounds, within the parish of Little Casterton, in the county of Rutland.
Lenton and Radford Inclosure Act 1796 (repealed)	36 Geo. 3. c. 114 Pr.	18 May 1796
An act for dividing and inclosing the forest, commons, and waste lands, within the liberties or townships of Lenton and Radford, in the county of Nottingham. (Repealed by Statute Law (Repeals) Act 1995 (c. 44))
Guiseley Common Inclosure Act 1796	36 Geo. 3. c. 115 Pr.	18 May 1796
An act for dividing and inclosing a common call Guiseley Common, and other waste grounds, within the manor and township of Guiseley, in the west riding of the county of York.
Falck's Naturalization Act 1796	36 Geo. 3. c. 116 Pr.	18 May 1796
An act for naturalizing John Christopher Falck.
Foley's Estate Act 1796	36 Geo. 3. c. 117 Pr.	19 May 1796
An act for enabling the honourable Andrew Foley, the surviving trustee of two terms, of ninety-nine years, and one hundred and one years, created by the will of Thomas lord Foley, his late father, deceased, to grant leases, of some parts of the estates comprized in those terms, and also to renew leases and copyhold grants made to, or in trust for, the said Thomas lord Foley, deceased, or one of those under whom he derived a title; also to make exchanges of some parts of the premises comprized in the said term of ninety-nine years, and likewise to enable the said Andrew Foley to fell certain detached parts of the hereditaments and premises comprized in the said term of one hundred and one years, and to lay out the money to arise by such sale in the purchase of other estates, to be settled to the same uses.
Johnstone's Estate Act 1796	36 Geo. 3. c. 118 Pr.	19 May 1796
An act for vesting certain plantations and estates in the inland of Grenada, late of sir James Johnstone baronet, in trustees, to raise money by mortgage for repairing the damage done thereto in the late insurrections.
Hastings' Naturalization Act 1796	36 Geo. 3. c. 119 Pr.	19 May 1796
An act for naturalizing Marian Hastings.

=== Sources ===
- Pickering, Danby, ed. (1795). "Anno regni tricesimo sexto Georgii III". The Statutes at Large. Vol. 40. pp. 628–858 – via Google Books.
- Journals of the House of Commons. Vol. 51. London: His Majesty's Stationery Office. 1803. pp. 3–793 – via Google Books.
- Chronological Table of and Index to the Statutes. Vol. 1: To the End of the Session 59 Vict. Sess. 2 (1895) (13th ed.). London: Her Majesty's Stationery Office. 1896. pp. 158–159 – via Google Books.

== 37 Geo. 3 ==
The first session of the 18th Parliament of Great Britain, which met from 27 September 1796 until 20 July 1797.

This session was also traditionally cited as 37 G. 3.

=== Public acts ===
Short title	Citation	Royal assent
Long title
Duties on Malt, etc. Act 1796 (repealed)	37 Geo. 3. c. 1	2 November 1796
An act for continuing and granting to his Majesty certain duties upon malt, mum, cyder, and perry, for the service of the year one thousand seven hundred and ninety-seven. (Repealed by Statute Law Revision Act 1871 (34 & 35 Vict. c. 116))
Land Tax (No. 2) Act 1796 (repealed)	37 Geo. 3. c. 2	2 November 1796
An act for granting an aid to his Majesty by a land tax, to be raised in Great Britain, for the service of the year one thousand seven hundred and ninety-seven. (Repealed by Statute Law Revision Act 1871 (34 & 35 Vict. c. 116))
Militia Act 1796 (repealed)	37 Geo. 3. c. 3	11 November 1796
An act for providing an augmentation to the militia, to be trained and exercised in the manner therein directed; and for enabling his Majesty to cause the same to be embodied, in case of necessity, for the defence of these kingdoms. (Repealed by Militia Act 1802 (42 Geo. 3. c. 90))
Manning of the Army and Navy Act 1796 (repealed)	37 Geo. 3. c. 4	11 November 1796
An act for raising a certain number of men, in the several counties in England, for the service of his Majesty's army and navy. (Repealed by Statute Law Revision Act 1871 (34 & 35 Vict. c. 116))
Manning of the Army and Navy (Scotland) Act 1796 (repealed)	37 Geo. 3. c. 5	11 November 1796
An act for raising a certain number of men in the several counties, stewartries, royal burghs, and towns, in that part of Great Britain called Scotland, for the service of bis Majesty's army and navy. (Repealed by Statute Law Revision Act 1871 (34 & 35 Vict. c. 116))
Provisional Cavalry Act 1796 (repealed)	37 Geo. 3. c. 6	11 November 1796
An act for enabling his Majesty to raise a provisional force of cavalry, to be embodied, in case of necessity, for the defence of these kingdoms. (Repealed by Statute Law Revision Act 1871 (34 & 35 Vict. c. 116))
Exportation and Importation Act 1796 (repealed)	37 Geo. 3. c. 7	11 November 1796
An act to continue for a limited time, and amend an act made in the last session of parliament, intituled, "An act to prohibit the exportation of corn, meal, flour, and potatoes, and to permit the importation of corn, and other articles of provision, for a limited time, in any ships whatever, without payment of duty;" (Note: Exportation and Importation (No. 2) Act 1795 (36 Geo. 3. c. 3)) and for permitting wheat, wheat flour, and meal, imported, in order to obtain the bounties granted by an act of the last session of parliament, but which have not been found fit for making bread, to be used in the manufacture of starch, hair powder, and blue, or in the distillation of low wines and spirits. (Repealed by Statute Law Revision Act 1871 (34 & 35 Vict. c. 116))
Importation (No. 3) Act 1796 (repealed)	37 Geo. 3. c. 8	11 November 1796
An act to continue for a limited time an act made In the thirty-fifth year of the reign of his present Majesty, (Note: Importation (No. 2) Act 1795 (35 Geo. 3. c. 100)) for permitting the importation of organzined thrown silk, flax, and flax feed, into this kingdom, in ships or vessels belonging to any kingdom or state in amity with his Majesty. (Repealed by Statute Law Revision Act 1871 (34 & 35 Vict. c. 116))
National Debt (No. 4) Act 1796 (repealed)	37 Geo. 3. c. 9	12 November 1796
An Act for granting annuities to satisfy certain navy, victualling, transport, and exchequer bills. (Repealed by Statute Law Revision Act 1870 (33 & 34 Vict. c. 69))
National Debt (No. 5) Act 1796 (repealed)	37 Geo. 3. c. 10	23 December 1796
An act for raising the sum of eighteen million by way of annuities. (Repealed by Statute Law Revision Act 1870 (33 & 34 Vict. c. 69))
Indemnity (No. 2) Act 1796 (repealed)	37 Geo. 3. c. 11	23 December 1796
An act to indemnify such persons as have omitted to qualify themselves for offices and employments; and to indemnify justices of the peace, or others, who have omitted to register or deliver in their qualifications within the time limited by law, and for giving further time for those purposes; and to indemnify members and officers, in cities, corporations and borough towns, whose admissions have been omitted to be stamped according to law, or having been stamped, have been lost or mislaid, and for allowing them time to provide admissions duly stamped; to give further time to such persons as have omitted to make and file affidavits of the execution of indentures of clerks to attornies and solicitors; and for indemnifying deputy lieutenants and officers of the militia, who have neglected to transmit descriptions of their qualifications to the clerks of the peace within the time limited by law, and for allowing further time for that purpose. (Repealed by Promissory Oaths Act 1871 (34 & 35 Vict. c. 48))
Merchandise in Neutral Ships Act 1796 (repealed)	37 Geo. 3. c. 12	23 December 1796
An act to continue several acts, made in the thirty-fifth (Note: Shipping Act 1795 (35 Geo. 3. c. 80)) and thirty-sixth (Note: Merchandise in Neutral Ships Act 1796 (36 Geo. 3. c. 76)) years of his present Majesty'a reign, respecting the admission of certain articles of merchandize in neutral ships, and the issuing of orders in council for that purpose for a limited time. (Repealed by Statute Law Revision Act 1871 (34 & 35 Vict. c. 116))
Dudley Canal Act 1796 (repealed)	37 Geo. 3. c. 13	23 December 1796
An act to enable the company of proprietors of the Dudley canal navigation, to raise a further sum of money for completing the said navigation; and for amending the several acts relating thereto. (Repealed by Birmingham and Dudley Canal Consolidation Act 1846 (9 & 10 Vict. c. cclxix))
Excise Act 1796 (repealed)	37 Geo. 3. c. 14	28 December 1796
An act for granting to his Majesty additional duties of excise on auctions, bricks, cocoa nuts, British and foreign spirits, and tea. (Repealed by Statute Law Revision Act 1861 (24 & 25 Vict. c. 101))
Customs Act 1796 (repealed)	37 Geo. 3. c. 15	28 December 1796
An act for granting to his Majesty certain duties of customs, on goods, wares, and merchandize, imported into, exported from, or brought and carried coastwise, within Great Britain, except wine, and except coals, when brought or carried coastwise; and for applying the money to arise by virtue of an act passed in the last session of parliament, intituled, "An act for the reduction of the drawbacks and bounties now allowed on the exportation of sugar;" (Note: Drawbacks and Bounties Act 1795 (36 Geo. 3. c. 18)) towards defraying the encreased charge occasioned by any loan granted, or stock created, by any act or acts passed in the last session of parliament. (Repealed by Statute Law Revision Act 1861 (24 & 25 Vict. c. 101))
Stage Coach Duties Act 1796 (repealed)	37 Geo. 3. c. 16	28 December 1796
An act for granting to his Majesty an additional duty on stage coaches. (Repealed by Statute Law Revision Act 1861 (24 & 25 Vict. c. 101))
Duties on Distilleries (Scotland), etc. Act 1796 (repealed)	37 Geo. 3. c. 17	28 December 1796
An act for granting to his Majesty certain additional duties on distilleries in Scotland, and on the exportation of British-made spirits from England to Scotland, and from Scotland to England. (Repealed by Statute Law Revision Act 1861 (24 & 25 Vict. c. 101))
Postage Act 1796 (repealed)	37 Geo. 3. c. 18	28 December 1796
An act for altering certain rates of postage for conveyance of letters in England and Scotland respectively, and of packets to and from Great Britain, from and to Portugal and the British colonies in America respectively; and for setting apart at the receipt of the exchequer, for a certain period, out of the revenues of the post office, the annual sum of forty thousand pounds, towards defraying the increased charge occasioned by any loan raised, or slock created, by any act or acts passed in the thirty-fifth year of the reign of his present Majesty. (Repealed by Statute Law Revision Act 1861 (24 & 25 Vict. c. 101))
Stamps (No. 2) Act 1796 (repealed)	37 Geo. 3. c. 19	28 December 1796
An act for the more effectually securing the stamp duties on indentures, leases, bonds, and other deeds. (Repealed by Inland Revenue Repeal Act 1870 (33 & 34 Vict. c. 99))
National Debt (No. 6) Act 1796 (repealed)	37 Geo. 3. c. 20	28 December 1796
An act for extending the time limited by an act of this session, (Note: National Debt (No. 4) Act 1796 (37 Geo. 3. c. 6)) for delivering in navy, victualling, transport, and exchequer bills. (Repealed by Statute Law Revision Act 1870 (33 & 34 Vict. c. 69))
Cape of Good Hope Trade Act 1796 (repealed)	37 Geo. 3. c. 21	28 December 1796
An act authorizing his Majesty, for a limited time, to make regulations respecting the trade and commerce to and from the Cape of Good Hope. (Repealed by Statute Law Revision Act 1871 (34 & 35 Vict. c. 116))
Militia (No. 2) Act 1796 (repealed)	37 Geo. 3. c. 22	30 December 1796
An act to explain and amend an act, made in this present session of parliament, intituled, "An act for providing an augmentation to the militia, to be trained and exercised in the manner therein directed; and for enabling his Majesty to cause the same to be embodied, in case of necessity, for the defence of these kingdoms." (Note: Militia Act 1796 (37 Geo. 3. c. 3)) (Repealed by Militia Act 1802 (42 Geo. 3. c. 90))
Provisional Cavalry (No. 2) Act 1796 (repealed)	37 Geo. 3. c. 23	30 December 1796
An act to explain and amend an act, made in this present session of parliament, intituled, "An act for enabling his Majesty to raise a provisional force of cavalry, to be embodied in case of necessity, for the defence of these kingdoms." (Note: Provisional Cavalry Act 1796 (37 Geo. 3. c. 6)) (Repealed by Statute Law Revision Act 1871 (34 & 35 Vict. c. 116))
Manning of the Army and Navy (No. 2) Act 1796 (repealed)	37 Geo. 3. c. 24	30 December 1796
An act to explain and amend an act made in this present session of parliament, intituled, "An act for raising a certain number of men in the several counties in England, for the service of his Majesty's army and navy." (Note: Manning of the Army and Navy Act 1796 (37 Geo. 3. c. 4)) (Repealed by Statute Law Revision Act 1871 (34 & 35 Vict. c. 116))
Militia (Tower Hamlets) Act 1796 (repealed)	37 Geo. 3. c. 25	30 December 1796
An act for the better raising and ordering the militia forces of the Tower Hamlets, in the county of Middlesex. (Repealed by Territorial Army and Militia Act 1921 (11 & 12 Geo. 5. c. 37))
Navy Victualling and Transport Bills Act 1796 (repealed)	37 Geo. 3. c. 26	30 December 1796
An act to provide for the more speedy payment of all navy, victualling, and transport bills, that shall be issued in future. (Repealed by Statute Law Revision Act 1861 (24 & 25 Vict. c. 101))
Loans to Grenada and Saint Vincent Traders Act 1796 (repealed)	37 Geo. 3. c. 27	30 December 1796
An act for allowing further time for the payment of instalments to become due on certain sums advanced by way of loan, pursuant to an act of the thirty-fifth year of the reign of his present Majesty, intituled, "An act for enabling his Majesty to direct the issue of exchequer bills to a limited amount, for the purposes, and in the manner therein mentioned;" (Note: Relief of Traders of Grenada, etc. Act 1795 (35 Geo. 3. c. 127)) and for granting further relief to persons connected with and trading to the islands of Grenada and St. Vincent. (Repealed by Statute Law Revision Act 1871 (34 & 35 Vict. c. 116))

=== Private acts ===
Short title	Citation	Royal assent
Long title
Testolini's Naturalization Act 1796	37 Geo. 3. c. 1 Pr.	25 October 1796
An act for naturalizing Gaetano Testolini.
Astor's Naturalization Act 1796	37 Geo. 3. c. 2 Pr.	11 November 1796
An act for naturalizing George Astor.
Horn's Naturalization Act 1796	37 Geo. 3. c. 3 Pr.	11 November 1796
An act for naturalizing Nicholas Horn.
Opie's Divorce Act 1796	37 Geo. 3. c. 4 Pr.	23 December 1796
An act to dissolve the marriage of John Opie esquire, with Mary Bunn, his now wife, and to enable him to marry again, and for other purposes therein mentioned.
Aller Inclosure Act 1796	37 Geo. 3. c. 5 Pr.	23 December 1796
An act for dividing, and allotting, the open and commonable pastures, and for exchanging, allotting, and improving, the open and commonable arable lands, within the parish of Aller, in the county of Somerset.
South Normanton Inclosure Act 1796	37 Geo. 3. c. 6 Pr.	23 December 1796
An act for dividing and enclosing the several commons and waste grounds, within the manor and parish of South Normanton, in the county of Derby.
Gruneisen's Naturalization Act 1796	37 Geo. 3. c. 7 Pr.	23 December 1796
An act for naturalizing Charles Gruneisen.
Ravelli's Naturalization Act 1796	37 Geo. 3. c. 8 Pr.	23 December 1796
An act for naturalizing Anthony Ravelli.
Naturalization of Abram, Henry and Louis Borel and Stephen Azemar Act 1796	37 Geo. 3. c. 9 Pr.	23 December 1796
An act for naturalizing Abraham Henry Borel, Henry Borel, Louis Borel, and Stephen Azemar.
Naturalization of John Steinberg and Charles Blaurock Act 1796	37 Geo. 3. c. 10 Pr.	23 December 1796
An act for naturalising John Frederick Steinberg and Charles Blaurock.
Choumert's Naturalization Act 1796	37 Geo. 3. c. 11 Pr.	23 December 1796
An act for naturalizing George Choumert.
De Gruyter Vink's Naturalization Act 1796	37 Geo. 3. c. 12 Pr.	23 December 1796
An act for naturalizing Wynand Adriaen de Gruyter Vink.
Hinrichs' Naturalization Act 1796	37 Geo. 3. c. 13 Pr.	23 December 1796
An act for naturalizing Ulrich Anthony Hinrichs.

=== Sources ===
- Pickering, Danby, ed. (1797). "Anno regni tricesimo septimo Georgii III". The Statutes at Large. Vol. 41. pp. 1–191 – via Google Books.
- Pickering, Danby, ed. (1797). "Anno regni tricesimo septimo Georgii III". The Statutes at Large. Vol. 41. Cambridge, Printed by J. Bentham. pp. 1–191 – via Internet Archive.
- Journals of the House of Commons. Vol. 52. London: His Majesty's Stationery Office. 1803. pp. 7–756 – via Google Books.
- Chronological Table of and Index to the Statutes. Vol. 1: To the End of the Session 59 Vict. Sess. 2 (1895) (13th ed.). London: Her Majesty's Stationery Office. 1896. pp. 159–162 – via Google Books.

== See also ==
- List of acts of the Parliament of Great Britain
