= List of acts of the Parliament of the United Kingdom from 1827 =

This is a complete list of acts of the Parliament of the United Kingdom for the year 1827.

Note that the first parliament of the United Kingdom was held in 1801; parliaments between 1707 and 1800 were either parliaments of Great Britain or of Ireland). For acts passed up until 1707, see the list of acts of the Parliament of England and the list of acts of the Parliament of Scotland. For acts passed from 1707 to 1800, see the list of acts of the Parliament of Great Britain. See also the list of acts of the Parliament of Ireland.

For acts of the devolved parliaments and assemblies in the United Kingdom, see the list of acts of the Scottish Parliament, the list of acts of the Northern Ireland Assembly, and the list of acts and measures of Senedd Cymru; see also the list of acts of the Parliament of Northern Ireland.

The number shown after each act's title is its chapter number. Acts passed before 1963 are cited using this number, preceded by the year(s) of the reign during which the relevant parliamentary session was held; thus the Union with Ireland Act 1800 is cited as "39 & 40 Geo. 3 c. 67", meaning the 67th act passed during the session that started in the 39th year of the reign of George III and which finished in the 40th year of that reign. Note that the modern convention is to use Arabic numerals in citations (thus "41 Geo. 3" rather than "41 Geo. III"). Acts of the last session of the Parliament of Great Britain and the first session of the Parliament of the United Kingdom are both cited as "41 Geo. 3". Acts passed from 1963 onwards are simply cited by calendar year and chapter number.

All modern acts have a short title, e.g. the Local Government Act 2003. Some earlier acts also have a short title given to them by later acts, such as by the Short Titles Act 1896.

== 7 & 8 Geo. 4 ==
Continuing the first session of the 8th Parliament of the United Kingdom, which met from 14 November 1826 until 2 July 1827.

This session was also traditionally cited as 7 & 8 G. 4.

=== Public general acts ===
Short title	Citation	Royal assent
Long title
Mutiny Act 1827 (repealed)	7 & 8 Geo. 4. c. 4	21 March 1827
An Act for punishing Mutiny and Desertion; and for the better Payment of the Army and their Quarters. (Repealed by Statute Law Revision Act 1873 (36 & 37 Vict. c. 91))
Marine Mutiny Act 1827 (repealed)	7 & 8 Geo. 4. c. 5	21 March 1827
An Act for the regulating of His Majesty's Royal Marine Forces while on Shore. (Repealed by Statute Law Revision Act 1873 (36 & 37 Vict. c. 91))
Postage Act 1827 (repealed)	7 & 8 Geo. 4. c. 6	21 March 1827
An Act for granting to His Majesty Rates of Postage on the Conveyance of Letters and Packets to and from Saint Domingo and Cuba. (Repealed by Post Office (Repeal of Laws) Act 1837 (7 Will. 4 & 1 Vict. c. 32))
Duties on Personal Estates Act 1827 (repealed)	7 & 8 Geo. 4. c. 7	2 April 1827
An Act for continuing to His Majesty for One Year certain Duties on Personal Estates, Offices, and Pensions in England, and also certain Duties on Sugar imported into the United Kingdom, for the Service of the Year One thousand eight hundred and twenty seven. (Repealed by Statute Law Revision Act 1873 (36 & 37 Vict. c. 91))
Pensions Act 1827 (repealed)	7 & 8 Geo. 4. c. 8	2 April 1827
An Act for more conveniently paying the Pensions of Widows of Officers of the Royal Marines. (Repealed by Admiralty Act 1832 (2 & 3 Will. 4. c. 40))
Ounce Thread Manufacture Act 1827 (repealed)	7 & 8 Geo. 4. c. 9	2 April 1827
An Act to repeal an Act of the Twenty eighth Year of His late Majesty, (Note: Manufacture of Ounce Thread Act 1788 (28 Geo. 3. c. 17)) for the better Regulation of the Manufacture of Ounce Thread. (Repealed by Statute Law Revision Act 1873 (36 & 37 Vict. c. 91))
Duke and Duchess of Clarence's Annuity Act 1827 (repealed)	7 & 8 Geo. 4. c. 10	2 April 1827
An Act to enable His Majesty to make further Provision for their Royal Highnesses the Duke and Duchess of Clarence. (Repealed by Statute Law Revision Act 1873 (36 & 37 Vict. c. 91))
Payment of Creditors (Scotland) Act 1827 (repealed)	7 & 8 Geo. 4. c. 11	2 April 1827
An Act to continue, until the Twenty fifth Day of July One thousand eight hundred and twenty eight, an Act of the Fifty fourth Year of His late Majesty, (Note: Payment of Creditors (Scotland) Act 1814 (54 Geo. 3. c. 137)) for rendering the Payment of Creditors more equal and expeditious in Scotland. (Repealed by Statute Law Revision Act 1873 (36 & 37 Vict. c. 91))
Public Works Loans (Ireland) Act 1827 (repealed)	7 & 8 Geo. 4. c. 12	2 April 1827
An Act to amend an Act of the First Year of His present Majesty, (Note: Public Works Loans (Ireland) Act 1820 (1 Geo. 4. c. 81)) for the Advance of Money for carrying on Public Works in Ireland. (Repealed by Statute Law Revision Act 1873 (36 & 37 Vict. c. 91))
Indemnity Act 1827 (repealed)	7 & 8 Geo. 4. c. 13	12 April 1827
An Act to indemnify such Persons in the United Kingdom as have omitted to qualify themselves for Offices and Employments, and for extending the Time limited for those Purposes respectively. (Repealed by Promissory Oaths Act 1871 (34 & 35 Vict. c. 48))
Quartering of Soldiers Act 1827 (repealed)	7 & 8 Geo. 4. c. 14	12 April 1827
An Act for fixing, until the Twenty fifth Day of March One thousand eight hundred and twenty eight, the Rates of Subsistence to be paid to Innkeepers and others on quartering Soldiers. (Repealed by Statute Law Revision Act 1873 (36 & 37 Vict. c. 91))
Bills of Exchange, etc. Act 1827 (repealed)	7 & 8 Geo. 4. c. 15	12 April 1827
An Act for declaring the Law in relation to Bills of Exchange and Promissory Notes becoming payable on Good Friday or Christmas Day. (Repealed for Ireland by Bills of Exchange (Ireland) Act 1828 (9 Geo. 4. c. 24) and for England and Wales and Scotland by Bills of Exchange Act 1882 (45 & 46 Vict. c. 61))
Supply Act 1827 (repealed)	7 & 8 Geo. 4. c. 16	12 April 1827
An Act for applying certain Sums of Money for the Service of the Year One thousand eight hundred and twenty seven. (Repealed by Statute Law Revision Act 1873 (36 & 37 Vict. c. 91))
Distress (Costs) Act 1827 (repealed)	7 & 8 Geo. 4. c. 17	28 May 1827
An Act to extend the Provisions of an Act made in the Fifty-seventh Year of King George the Third, (Note: Distress (Costs) Act 1817 (57 Geo. 3. c. 93)) for regulating the Costs of certain Distresses. (Repealed by Statute Law (Repeals) Act 1995 (c. 44))
Spring Guns Act 1827 (repealed)	7 & 8 Geo. 4. c. 18	28 May 1827
An Act to prohibit the setting of Spring Guns, Man Traps, and other Engines calculated to destroy human Life, or inflict grievous bodily Harm. (Repealed by Criminal Statutes Repeal Act 1861 (24 & 25 Vict. c. 95))
Passenger Vessels Act 1827 (repealed)	7 & 8 Geo. 4. c. 19	28 May 1827
An Act to repeal an Act of the Sixth Year of His present Majesty, (Note: Passenger Vessels Act 1825 (6 Geo. 4. c. 116)) for regulating Vessels carrying Passengers to Foreign Parts. (Repealed by Statute Law Revision Act 1873 (36 & 37 Vict. c. 91))
Fraudulent Bankrupts (Scotland) Act 1827 (repealed)	7 & 8 Geo. 4. c. 20	28 May 1827
An Act to regulate the Prosecution of fraudulent Bankrupts in Scotland. (Repealed by Statute Law (Repeals) Act 1973 (c. 39))
Postage (No. 2) Act 1827 (repealed)	7 & 8 Geo. 4. c. 21	28 May 1827
An Act to amend the Laws relating to the Duties of Postage in Great Britain and Ireland. (Repealed by Post Office (Repeal of Laws) Act 1837 (7 Will. 4 & 1 Vict. c. 32))
Insolvent Debtors (Ireland) Act 1827 (repealed)	7 & 8 Geo. 4. c. 22	14 June 1827
An Act to continue for One Year, and until the End of the then next Session of Parliament, the Acts for the Relief of Insolvent Debtors in Ireland. (Repealed by Statute Law Revision Act 1873 (36 & 37 Vict. c. 91))
Roads, etc. (Ireland) Act 1827 (repealed)	7 & 8 Geo. 4. c. 23	14 June 1827
An Act to continue for One Year, and until the End of the then next Session of Parliament, an Act of the Sixth Year of His present Majesty, (Note: Repair of Roads and Bridges (Ireland) Act 1825 (6 Geo. 4. c. 101)) for providing for the repairing, maintaining, and keeping in repair certain Roads and Bridges in Ireland. (Repealed by Statute Law Revision Act 1873 (36 & 37 Vict. c. 91))
Turnpike Roads (England) Act 1827 (repealed)	7 & 8 Geo. 4. c. 24	14 June 1827
An Act to amend the Acts for regulating Turnpike Roads in England. (Repealed by Statute Law (Repeals) Act 1981 (c. 19))
Resignation Bonds Act 1827 (repealed)	7 & 8 Geo. 4. c. 25	14 June 1827
An Act for the Relief of certain Spiritual Persons, and Patrons of Ecclesiastical Preferments, from certain Penalties; and rendering valid certain Bonds, Covenants, or other Assurances for the Resignation of Ecclesiastical Preferments. (Repealed by Statute Law Revision Act 1873 (36 & 37 Vict. c. 91))
Youghal Rectory Act 1827	7 & 8 Geo. 4. c. 26	14 June 1827
An Act for disappropriating, disuniting, and divesting the Rectory and Rectorial Tithes of the Parish of Youghal from and out of the Bishopric of the Diocese of Cloyney in Ireland, whereby the Incumbent of such Rectory should have the actual Core of Souls in the said Parish.
Criminal Statutes Repeal Act 1827 or the Criminal Statutes (England) Repeal Act 1827 (repealed)	7 & 8 Geo. 4. c. 27	21 June 1827
An Act for repealing various Statutes in England relative to the Benefit of Clergy, and to Larceny and other Offences connected therewith, and to malicious Injuries to Property, and to Remedies against the Hundred. (Repealed by Statute Law Revision Act 1873 (36 & 37 Vict. c. 91))
Criminal Law Act 1827 (repealed)	7 & 8 Geo. 4. c. 28	21 June 1827
An Act for further improving the Administration of Justice in Criminal Cases in England. (Repealed by Criminal Law Act 1967 (c. 58))
Larceny Act 1827 (repealed)	7 & 8 Geo. 4. c. 29	21 June 1827
An Act for consolidating and amending the Laws in England relative to Larceny and other Offences connected therewith. (Repealed by Criminal Statutes Repeal Act 1861 (24 & 25 Vict. c. 95))
Malicious Injuries to Property (England) Act 1827 or the Malicious Injuries to Property Act 1827 (repealed)	7 & 8 Geo. 4. c. 30	21 June 1827
An Act for consolidating and amending the Laws in England relative to malicious Injuries to Property. (Repealed by Criminal Statutes Repeal Act 1861 (24 & 25 Vict. c. 95))
Remedies Against the Hundred (England) Act 1827 (repealed)	7 & 8 Geo. 4. c. 31	21 June 1827
An Act for consolidating and amending the Laws in England relative to Remedies against the Hundred. (Repealed by Riot (Damages) Act 1886 (49 & 50 Vict. c. 38))
Destruction of Dwelling Houses (Ireland) Act 1827 (repealed)	7 & 8 Geo. 4. c. 32	21 June 1827
An Act to explain and amend an Act passed in the Seventh Year of the Reign of His present Majesty, intituled "An Act to prevent the wilful and malicious Destruction of Dwelling Houses in Ireland." (Note: Destruction of Dwelling Houses (Ireland) Act 1826 (7 Geo. 4. c. 60)) (Repealed by Criminal Statutes (Ireland) Repeal Act 1828 (9 Geo. 4. c. 53))
Millbank Penitentiary Act 1827 (repealed)	7 & 8 Geo. 4. c. 33	21 June 1827
An Act for the further Regulation of the General Penitentiary at Millbank. (Repealed by Millbank Prison Act 1843 (6 & 7 Vict. c. 26))
Minister's Money (Ireland) Act 1827 (repealed)	7 & 8 Geo. 4. c. 34	21 June 1827
An Act to amend the Acts relating to the Provision of Ministers in Cities and Corporate Towns in Ireland. (Repealed by Statute Law Revision Act 1861 (24 & 25 Vict. c. 101))
London and Holyhead and Liverpool Roads Act 1827 (repealed)	7 & 8 Geo. 4. c. 35	21 June 1827
An Act for the further Improvement of the Road from London to Holyhead, and of the Road from London to Liverpool. (Repealed by Holyhead Road Act 1828 (9 Geo. 4. c. 75), Holyhead, Liverpool Roads Act 1830 (11 Geo. 4 & 1 Will. 4. c. 67) and Statute Law (Repeals) Act 2013 (c. 2))
Deserted Children (Ireland) Act 1827 (repealed)	7 & 8 Geo. 4. c. 36	21 June 1827
An Act to continue until the First Day of January One thousand eight hundred and Twenty eight, and from thence until the End of the then next Session of Parliament, an Act passed in the Sixth Year of the Reign of His present Majesty, (Note: Deserted Children (Ireland) Act 1825 (6 Geo. 4. c. 102)) respecting deserted Children in Ireland. (Repealed by Statute Law Revision Act 1873 (36 & 37 Vict. c. 91))
Corrupt Practices at Elections Act 1827 (repealed)	7 & 8 Geo. 4. c. 37	21 June 1827
An Act to make further Regulations for preventing corrupt Practices at Elections of Members to serve in Parliament, and for diminishing the Expence of such Elections. (Repealed by Corrupt Practices Prevention Act 1854 (17 & 18 Vict. c. 102))
Presentments by Constables Act 1827 (repealed)	7 & 8 Geo. 4. c. 38	21 June 1827
An Act for discontinuing certain Presentments by Constables. (Repealed by Statute Law Revision Act 1873 (36 & 37 Vict. c. 91))
Rates of Carriage of Goods Act 1827 (repealed)	7 & 8 Geo. 4. c. 39	21 June 1827
An Act to repeal such Parts of Two Acts of King William and Queen Mary, (Note: Highways, etc. Act 1691 (3 Will. & Mar. c. 12)) and of King George the Second, (Note: Highways Act 1747 (21 Geo. 2. c. 28)) as relate to the settling the Rates of the Carriage of Goods. (Repealed by Statute Law Revision Act 1873 (36 & 37 Vict. c. 91))
Glass Duties Act 1827 (repealed)	7 & 8 Geo. 4. c. 40	21 June 1827
An Act to continue, until the Tenth Day of October One thousand eight hundred and thirty, an Act (Note: Excise (No. 4) Act 1819 (59 Geo. 3. c. 104)) relating to Duties of Excise on Crown, flint, and Phial Glass, and to alter certain Laws of Excise relating to Flint Glass. (Repealed by Glass Duties Act 1838 (1 & 2 Vict. c. 44))
Exchequer Bills Act 1827 (repealed)	7 & 8 Geo. 4. c. 41	21 June 1827
An Act for raising the Sum of Thirteen millions eight hundred thousand Pounds by Exchequer Bills, for the Service of the Year One thousand eight hundred and twenty seven. (Repealed by Statute Law Revision Act 1873 (36 & 37 Vict. c. 91))
Supply (No. 2) Act 1827 (repealed)	7 & 8 Geo. 4. c. 42	21 June 1827
An Act for granting and applying certain Sums of Money for the Service of the Year One thousand eight hundred and twenty seven. (Repealed by Statute Law Revision Act 1873 (36 & 37 Vict. c. 91))
Union of Parishes (Ireland) Act 1827 or the Union of Parishes Act 1827	7 & 8 Geo. 4. c. 43	23 June 1827
An Act to consolidate and amend the Laws in force in Ireland for Unions and Divisions of Parishes, and for uniting or disappropriating Appropriate Parishes or Parts of Parishes; and to make further Provision with respect to the erecting Chapels of Ease, and making Perpetual Cures.
Prerogative Court, etc. (Ireland) Act 1827 (repealed)	7 & 8 Geo. 4. c. 44	23 June 1827
An Act to provide for the Payment of a Salary (in lieu of Fees) to the Judge of the Prerogative Court and Court of Faculties in Ireland. (Repealed by Statute Law Revision Act 1873 (36 & 37 Vict. c. 91))
Articles of Clerkship, etc., Inrolment Act 1827 (repealed)	7 & 8 Geo. 4. c. 45	23 June 1827
An Act to allow, until the Twenty fourth Day of October One thousand eight hundred and twenty seven the Inrolment of certain Articles of Clerkship and Assignments thereof. (Repealed by Statute Law Revision Act 1873 (36 & 37 Vict. c. 91))
General Register House, Edinburgh Act 1827 (repealed)	7 & 8 Geo. 4. c. 46	23 June 1827
An Act for the better enabling the Commissioners appointed by an Act passed in the Third Year of His present Majesty (Note: Fees in Office of Lord Register of Scotland Act 1822 (3 Geo. 4. c. 62)) to complete the Buildings of His Majesty's General Register House at Edinburgh. (Repealed by Statute Law Revision Act 1861 (24 & 25 Vict. c. 101))
Advances for Public Works Act 1827 (repealed)	7 & 8 Geo. 4. c. 47	23 June 1827
An Act for the further Amendment and Extension of the Powers of the several Acts authorizing Advances for carrying on Public Works. (Repealed by Public Works Loans Act 1875 (38 & 39 Vict. c. 89))
Alehouses (England) Act 1827 (repealed)	7 & 8 Geo. 4. c. 48	23 June 1827
An Act to continue until the First Day of June One thousand eight hundred and twenty eight, and from thence to the End of the then next Session of Parliament, an Act of the Third Year of His present Majesty, (Note: Licensing of Ale Houses Act 1822 (3 Geo. 4. c. 77)) for regulating the Manner of licensing Alehouses in England. (Repealed by Statute Law Revision Act 1873 (36 & 37 Vict. c. 91))
Game Certificates (United Kingdom) Act 1827 (repealed)	7 & 8 Geo. 4. c. 49	23 June 1827
An Act to exempt Persons who have procured Game Certificates in Great Britain from the Duty on Game Certificates in Ireland, and to authorize Persons who have paid Duty on Game Certificates in Ireland to kill Game in Great Britain, upon paying the additional Duty only. (Repealed by Game Licences Act 1860 (23 & 24 Vict. c. 90))
Militia Pay Act 1827 (repealed)	7 & 8 Geo. 4. c. 50	23 June 1827
An Act to defray the Charge of the Pay, Clothing, and contingent and other Expences of the Disembodied Militia in Great Britain and Ireland; and to grant Allowances in certain Cases to Subaltern Officers, Adjutants, Quarter Masters, Surgeons, Assistant Surgeons, Surgeons Mates, and Serjeant Majors of Militia, until me Twenty fifth Day of March One thousand eight hundred and Twenty eight. (Repealed by Statute Law Revision Act 1873 (36 & 37 Vict. c. 91))
Exchequer, Equity Side (Ireland), etc. Act 1827 (repealed)	7 & 8 Geo. 4. c. 51	23 June 1827
An Act for further amending an Act passed in the Fourth Year of His present Majesty's Reign, (Note: Court of Exchequer (Ireland) Act 1823 (4 Geo. 4. c. 70)) for the better Administration of Justice in the Equity Side of the Court of Exchequer in Ireland. (Repealed by Statute Law Revision Act 1873 (36 & 37 Vict. c. 91))
Excise on Malt Act 1827 (repealed)	7 & 8 Geo. 4. c. 52	2 July 1827
An Act to consolidate and amend certain Laws relating to the Revenue of Excise on Malt made in the United Kingdom; and for amending the Laws relating to Brewers in Ireland, and to the Allowance in respect of the Malt Duty on Spirits made in Scotland and Ireland from Malt only. (Repealed by Inland Revenue Act 1880 (43 & 44 Vict. c. 20))
Excise Management Act 1827 (repealed)	7 & 8 Geo. 4. c. 53	2 July 1827
An Act to consolidate and amend the Laws relating to the Collection and Management of the Revenue of Excise throughout Great Britain and Ireland. (Repealed by Customs and Excise Act 1952 (15 & 16 Geo. 6 & 1 Eliz. 2. c. 44) and House of Commons Disqualification Act 1957 (5 & 6 Eliz. 2. c. 20))
Slave Trade (Treaty with Sweden) Act 1827 (repealed)	7 & 8 Geo. 4. c. 54	2 July 1827
An Act to carry into Effect the Treaty with Sweden relative to the Slave Trade. (Repealed by Slave Trade Act 1873 (36 & 37 Vict. c. 88))
Board of Stamps in Great Britain and Ireland Act 1827 (repealed)	7 & 8 Geo. 4. c. 55	2 July 1827
An Act to consolidate the Boards of Stamps in Great Britain and Ireland. (Repealed by Inland Revenue Regulation Act 1890 (53 & 54 Vict. c. 21))
Customs Act 1827 (repealed)	7 & 8 Geo. 4. c. 56	2 July 1827
An Act to amend the Laws relating to the Customs. (Repealed by Customs (Repeal) Act 1833 (3 & 4 Will. 4. c. 50))
Importation of Corn Act 1827 (repealed)	7 & 8 Geo. 4. c. 57	2 July 1827
An Act to permit, until the First Day of May One thousand eight hundred and twenty eight, certain Corn, Meal, and Flour to be entered for Home Consumption. (Repealed by Statute Law Revision Act 1873 (36 & 37 Vict. c. 91))
Average Price of Corn Act 1827 (repealed)	7 & 8 Geo. 4. c. 58	2 July 1827
An Act to make Provision for ascertaining from time to time the Average Prices of British Corn. (Repealed by Importation of Corn Act 1828 (9 Geo. 4. c. 60))
Manor Courts (Ireland) Act 1827 (repealed)	7 & 8 Geo. 4. c. 59	2 July 1827
An Act for further amending the Laws for the Recovery of Small Debts, and the Proceedings for that Purpose, in the Manor Courts in Ireland. (Repealed by Statute Law Revision Act 1873 (36 & 37 Vict. c. 91))
Compositions for Tithes (Ireland) Act 1827 (repealed)	7 & 8 Geo. 4. c. 60	2 July 1827
An Act to amend the Acts for the establishing of Compositions for Tithes in Ireland. (Repealed by Statute Law Revision Act 1873 (36 & 37 Vict. c. 91))
Butter Trade (Ireland) Act 1827 (repealed)	7 & 8 Geo. 4. c. 61	2 July 1827
An Act to amend the Laws for the Regulation of the Butter Trade in Ireland. (Repealed by Statute Law Revision Act 1873 (36 & 37 Vict. c. 91), Statute Law Revision (No. 2) Act 1888 (51 & 52 Vict. c. 57), Statute Law Revision (No. 2) Act 1890 (53 & 54 Vict. c. 51) and Repeal of Unnecessary Laws Act (Northern Ireland) 1953 (c. 5 (N.I.)))
Clergy Reserves (Canada) Act 1827 (repealed)	7 & 8 Geo. 4. c. 62	2 July 1827
An Act to authorize the Sale of a Part of the Clergy Reserves in the Provinces of Upper and Lower Canada. (Repealed by Statute Law Revision Act 1874 (37 & 38 Vict. c. 35))
Mutiny (No. 2) Act 1827 (repealed)	7 & 8 Geo. 4. c. 63	2 July 1827
An Act to explain so much of an Act of the present Session of Parliament, (Note: Mutiny Act 1827 (7 & 8 Geo. 4. c. 4)) for punishing Mutiny and Desertion, as relates to the Transportation of Offenders. (Repealed by Statute Law Revision Act 1873 (36 & 37 Vict. c. 91))
Costs on Private Bills Act 1827 (repealed)	7 & 8 Geo. 4. c. 64	2 July 1827
An Act to establish a Taxation of Costs on Private Bills in the House of Lords. (Repealed by House of Lords Costs Taxation Act 1849 (12 & 13 Vict. c. 78))
Admiralty Act 1827 (repealed)	7 & 8 Geo. 4. c. 65	2 July 1827
An Act to explain and remove Doubts touching the Admiralty. (Repealed by Defence (Transfer of Functions) (No. 1) Order 1964 (SI 1964/488))
Crown Lands Act 1827 (repealed)	7 & 8 Geo. 4. c. 66	2 July 1827
An Act to extend an Act of the Fifty sixth Year of His late Majesty, (Note: Marylebone Park Paving, etc. Act 1816 (56 Geo. 3. c. 128)) for enabling His Majesty to grant small Portions of Land as Sites for Public Buildings, or to be used as Cemeteries. (Repealed by Statute Law Revision Act 1861 (24 & 25 Vict. c. 101))
Petty Sessions (Ireland) Act 1827 (repealed)	7 & 8 Geo. 4. c. 67	2 July 1827
An Act for the better Administration of Justice at the holding of Petty Sessions by Justices of the Peace in Ireland. (Repealed by Statute Law Revision Act 1874 (37 & 38 Vict. c. 35))
Crown Lands (Ireland) Act 1827 (repealed)	7 & 8 Geo. 4. c. 68	2 July 1827
An Act for the Management and Improvement of the Land Revenues of the Crown in Ireland, and for other Purposes relating thereto. (Repealed by Statute Law Revision Act 1873 (36 & 37 Vict. c. 91))
Distresses (Ireland) Act 1827 (repealed)	7 & 8 Geo. 4. c. 69	2 July 1827
An Act to provide for the Relief of Persons aggrieved by unlawful or excessive Distresses in Ireland. (Repealed by Statute Law Revision Act 1873 (36 & 37 Vict. c. 91))
Exchequer Bills and Appropriation Act 1827 (repealed)	7 & 8 Geo. 4. c. 70	2 July 1827
An Act for enabling His Majesty to raise the Sum of Five hundred thousand Pounds by Exchequer Bills, and for appropriating the Supplies granted in this Session of Parliament. (Repealed by Statute Law Revision Act 1873 (36 & 37 Vict. c. 91))
Imprisonment for Debt Act 1827 (repealed)	7 & 8 Geo. 4. c. 71	2 July 1827
An Act to prevent Arrests upon Mesne Process where the Debt or Cause of Action is under Twenty Pounds; and to regulate the Practice of Arrests. (Repealed by Administration of Justice Act 1965 (c. 2))
Church Building Act 1827 (repealed)	7 & 8 Geo. 4. c. 72	2 July 1827
An Act to amend the Acts for building and promoting the building of additional Churches in populous Parishes. (Repealed by Isle of Man (Church Building and New Parishes) Act 1897 (60 & 61 Vict. c. 33), New Parishes Measure 1943 (No. 1) and Statute Law (Repeals) Act 1974 (c. 22))
Administration of Justice, New South Wales, etc. Act 1827 or the New South Wales Constitution Act 1828 (repealed)	7 & 8 Geo. 4. c. 73	2 July 1827
An Act to continue, until the Thirty first Day of December One thousand eight hundred and twenty nine, an Act of the Fourth Year of His present Majesty, (Note: Justice (New South Wales) Act 1823 (4 Geo. 4. c. 96)) for the better Administration of Justice in New South Wales and Van Diemen's Land. (Repealed by Statute Law Revision Act 1873 (36 & 37 Vict. c. 91))
Slave Trade (Convention with Brazil) Act 1827 (repealed)	7 & 8 Geo. 4. c. 74	2 July 1827
An Act to carry into Execution a Convention between His Majesty and the Emperor of Brazil, for the Regulation and final Abolition of the African Slave Trade. (Repealed by Slave Trade Act 1873 (36 & 37 Vict. c. 88))
Land Tax Commissioners Act 1827 (repealed)	7 & 8 Geo. 4. c. 75	23 June 1827
An Act to appoint Commissioners for carrying into Execution several Acts, granting an Aid to His Majesty by a Land Tax to be raised in Great Britain, and continuing to His Majesty certain Duties on Personal Estates, Offices, and Pensions, in England. (Repealed by Finance Act 1963 (c. 25))

=== Local acts ===
Short title	Citation	Royal assent
Long title
St. John's Church in Oulton (Yorkshire, West Riding) Act 1827	7 & 8 Geo. 4. c. i	21 March 1827
An Act for building a Church or Chapel of Ease within the Township of Oulton-cum-Woodlesford, in the Parish of Rothwell in the West Riding of the County of York.
Birmingham and Liverpool Junction Canal Navigation Act 1827 (repealed)	7 & 8 Geo. 4. c. ii	21 March 1827
An Act to enable the Company of Proprietors of the Birmingham and Liverpool Junction Canal Navigation to alter the Line of the said Navigation; and to make certain Branches therefrom, in the Counties of Stafford and Salop. (Repealed by Ellesmere and Chester Canal Company Act 1845 (8 & 9 Vict. c. ii))
Nantlle Railway Act 1827	7 & 8 Geo. 4. c. iii	21 March 1827
An Act for enabling the Company of Proprietors of the Nantlle Railway to raise a further Sum of Money, for completing the said Railway and other Works.
Temple Normanton and Tibshelf Turnpike Road (Derbyshire) Act 1827	7 & 8 Geo. 4. c. iv	21 March 1827
An Act for making and maintaining a Turnpike Road from Temple Normanton, in the Parish of Chesterfield, to the Mansfield and Tibshelf Turnpike Road, at or near Tibshelf Side Gate, in the County of Derby.
Ashcott and Rowberrow Hill Road (Somerset) Act 1827 (repealed)	7 & 8 Geo. 4. c. v	21 March 1827
An Act for making and maintaining a Road from Chappel's Corner, in the Parish of Ashcott, to join the Bristol Turnpike Road at or near Rowberrow Hill, all in the County of Somerset. (Repealed by Wedmore Turnpike Road Act 1852 (15 & 16 Vict. c. cxxxi))
Godley Lane Head and Northowram Road (Yorkshire, West Riding) Act 1827 (repealed)	7 & 8 Geo. 4. c. vi	21 March 1827
An Act for making and maintaining a Turnpike Road from Godley Lane Head, near Halifax, to Northowram Green, in the West Riding of the County of York. (Repealed by Godley Lane Head and Northowram Road Act 1856 (c.lxxxiii))
North Lincolnshire Roads Act 1827	7 & 8 Geo. 4. c. vii	21 March 1827
An Act for more effectually repairing and improving the Roads from the North-west Parts of the County of Lincoln, through Nettleham Fields, Wragby Lane, and Baumber Fields, to the North-east Part of the said County, and other Roads therein described in the said County, and in the City of Lincoln.
Road from Cosham to Chichester Act 1827	7 & 8 Geo. 4. c. viii	21 March 1827
An Act for more effectually repairing, widening, and improving the Road from Cosham in the County of Southampton to the City of Chichester.
Road through Salford and Eccles Act 1827 (repealed)	7 & 8 Geo. 4. c. ix	21 March 1827
An Act for more effectually repairing and maintaining the Road from Hulme across the River Irwell, through Salford to Eccles, in the County Palatine of Lancaster, and a Branch of Road communicating therewith. (Repealed by Hulme and Eccles Turnpike Road Act 1848 (11 & 12 Vict. c. cxlv))
Essex Prisons Act 1827 (repealed)	7 & 8 Geo. 4. c. x	2 April 1827
An Act for enabling the Justices of the Peace for the County of Essex to raise Money for defraying certain Expences incurred under an Act, passed in the First Year of the Reign of His present Majesty, intituled "An Act for building an additional Gaol for the County of Essex, and for enlarging, improving, and altering the existing Prisons for the same County;" (Note: Essex Gaols Act 1821 (1 & 2 Geo. 4. c. cii)) and for amending the said Act, and for extending the Powers thereof, and for other Purposes relating thereto. (Repealed by Statute Law (Repeals) Act 2008 (c. 12))
Canterbury and Whitstable Railway Act 1827	7 & 8 Geo. 4. c. xi	2 April 1827
An Act to authorize the Company of Proprietors of the Canterbury and Whitstable Railway to vary the Line of the Railway, to raise a further Sum of Money tor completing their Works, and to alter and enlarge the Powers of the Act (Note: Canterbury and Whitstable Railway Act 1825 (6 Geo. 4. c. cxx)) passed for making and maintaining the said Railway.
Forest of Dean Roads Act 1827 (repealed)	7 & 8 Geo. 4. c. xii	2 April 1827
An Act for more effectually repairing several Roads in and through His Majesty's Forest of Dean, and the Waste Lands thereto belonging, in the County of Gloucester, and in the Parishes of Newland, Awre, and Lydney, in the said County; and for making and maintaining several new Roads in and adjoining the said Forest. (Repealed by Forest of Dean Roads Act 1838 (1 & 2 Vict. c. xxxviii))
Road from Foxley Hatch to Reigate Act 1827 (repealed)	7 & 8 Geo. 4. c. xiii	2 April 1827
An Act for more effectually repairing and maintaining the Road from Foxley Hatch in the Parish of Croydon into the Town of Reigate in the County of Surrey. (Repealed by Croydon and Reigate Turnpike Road Act 1850 (13 & 14 Vict. c. xlix))
Barnstaple Roads Act 1827 (repealed)	7 & 8 Geo. 4. c. xiv	2 April 1827
An Act for more effectually improving and keeping in Repair the several Roads leading to and from the Town of Barnstaple in the County of Devon; and for making certain new Lines of Road to communicate with the same. (Repealed by Barnstaple Roads Act 1841 (4 & 5 Vict. c. xxi))
Roads from Watling Street, Birches Brook and Ball's Hill (Salop.) Act 1827 (repealed)	7 & 8 Geo. 4. c. xv	2 April 1827
An Act for more effectually repairing and improving the Roads from the Buck's Head at Watling Street to Beckbury and the New Inn, and from the Birches Brook to the Hand Post in the Parish of Kemberton; and for making a new Branch of Road from a Place called Ball's Hill in the Parish of Dawley, adjoining or near to the said Roads, to or near to a Place called Lawley in the Parish of Wellington; all in the County of Salop. (Repealed by Statute Law (Repeals) Act 2013 (c. 2))
Gloucester, Birdlip Hill and Crickley Hill Roads Act 1827 (repealed)	7 & 8 Geo. 4. c. xvi	2 April 1827
An Act for more effectually repairing the Roads from the City of Gloucester to the Top of Birdlip Hill, and from the Foot of the said Hill to the Top of Crickley Hill, in the County of Gloucester. (Repealed by Statute Law (Repeals) Act 2013 (c. 2))
Alford and Boston Road Act 1827 (repealed)	7 & 8 Geo. 4. c. xvii	2 April 1827
An Act for repairing the Road from Alford to Boston, and from thence to Cowbridge in the Township of Frithville, in the County of Lincoln. (Repealed by Alford and Boston Road Act 1855 (18 & 19 Vict. c. lxxxii))
Penryn and Redruth Roads Act 1827 (repealed)	7 & 8 Geo. 4. c. xviii	2 April 1827
An Act for more effectually amending and widening the Roads from Penryn to Redruth in the County of Cornwall; and for building a Bridge over Penryn River. (Repealed by Truro and Redruth Turnpike Roads Act 1849 (12 & 13 Vict. c. xliv))
Shillingford and Reading Road Act 1827 (repealed)	7 & 8 Geo. 4. c. xix	2 April 1827
An Act for more effectually repairing and improving the Road from Shillingford in the County of Oxford, through Wallingford and Pangborne, to Reading in the County of Berks; and for repairing and maintaining a Bridge over the River Thames at or near Shillingford Ferry. (Repealed by Shillingford, Wallingford and Reading Road Act 1852 (15 & 16 Vict. c. lxxix))
Heckbridge and Wentbridge Railway Act 1827	7 & 8 Geo. 4. c. xx	12 April 1827
An Act to amend and enlarge the Powers and Provisions of an Act (Note: Heckbridge and Wentbridge Railway Act 1826 (7 Geo. 4. c. xlvi)) relating to the Heckbridge and Wentbridge Railway.
Liverpool and Manchester Railway Act 1827 (repealed)	7 & 8 Geo. 4. c. xxi	12 April 1827
An Act for amending and enlarging the Powers and Provisions of an Act (Note: Liverpool and Manchester Railway Act 1826 (7 Geo. 4. c. xlix)) relating to the Liverpool and Manchester Railway. (Repealed by Grand Junction Railway Act 1845 (8 & 9 Vict. c. cxcviii))
Sun Fire Office Company Act 1827 or the Sun Fire Office Act 1827 (repealed)	7 & 8 Geo. 4. c. xxii	12 April 1827
An Act to remove Doubts as to the Validity of Life Annuities granted or purchased by the Sun Fire Office Company. (Repealed by Sun Insurance Office Act 1891 (54 & 55 Vict. c. xcvii))
St. John Horselydown Rectory Act 1827	7 & 8 Geo. 4. c. xxiii	12 April 1827
An Act for providing a further Maintenance for the Rector of the Parish of Saint John Horslydown, within the Town and Borough of Southwark, in the County of Surrey.
Birmingham Coal Company Act 1827	7 & 8 Geo. 4. c. xxiv	12 April 1827
An Act to enable the Birmingham Coal Company to sue and be sued in the Name of their Secretary, or One of the Members of the said Company.
Road from Chapel-en-le-Frith to Enterclough Bridge Act 1827 (repealed)	7 & 8 Geo. 4. c. xxv	12 April 1827
An Act for more effectually repairing and maintaining the Road from Chapel-en-le-Frith to or near to Enterclough Bridge in the County of Derby, and other Roads therein mentioned, in the said County of Derby, and in the County Palatine of Chester. (Repealed by Chapel-en-le-Frith Turnpike Roads Act 1854 (17 & 18 Vict. c. clxv))
Warwick and Paddle Brook and Stratford-upon-Avon Roads Act 1827	7 & 8 Geo. 4. c. xxvi	12 April 1827
An Act for repairing the Roads from Warwick to Paddle Brook in the Parish of Stretton-on-the-Fosse, and from Warwick to Stratford-upon-Avon, in the Counties of Warwick and Worcester.
Nottingham and Derby, and Lenton and Sawley Ferry Roads Act 1827	7 & 8 Geo. 4. c. xxvii	12 April 1827
An Act for more effectually repairing and otherwise improving the Road from the East End of Chapel Bar in Nottingham to the New China Works near Derby, and from the Guide Post in the Parish of Lenton to Sawley Ferry, all in the Counties of Nottingham and Derby.
Roads from Bury to Blackburn and Branches Act 1827 (repealed)	7 & 8 Geo. 4. c. xxviii	12 April 1827
An Act for more effectually amending, widening, and maintaining the Roads from the Town of Bury, through Haslingden, to Blackburn and Whalley, and also from Portfield to Padiham, and for making repairing and improving other Roads to communicate therewith, all in the County Palatine of Lancaster. (Repealed by Roads from Bury to Blackburn and Branches Act 1831 (1 Will. 4. c. xxxvii))
Norwich Poor Relief Act 1827 (repealed)	7 & 8 Geo. 4. c. xxix	28 May 1827
An Act to alter and amend an Act of the Tenth Year of Queen Anne, intituled "An Act for erecting a Workhouse in the City and County of the City of Norwich, for the better Employment and maintaining of the Poor there." (Note: Norwich Poor Act 1711 (10 Ann. c. 15)) (Repealed by Norwich Poor Relief Act 1831 (1 & 2 Will. 4. c. li))
London Bridge Act 1827	7 & 8 Geo. 4. c. xxx	28 May 1827
An Act to amend and enlarge the Powers of an Act passed in the Fourth Year of the Reign of His present Majesty, (Note: Rebuilding of London Bridge Act 1823 (4 Geo. 4. c. 50)) for the rebuilding of London Bridge, and for improving and making suitable Approaches thereto.
Bure Bridge (Norfolk) Act 1827	7 & 8 Geo. 4. c. xxxi	28 May 1827
An Act for erecting a Bridge over the River Bure, from Runham to Great Yarmouth, in the County of Norfolk.
Clyde Bridge opposite Jamaica Street, Glasgow Act 1827 (repealed)	7 & 8 Geo. 4. c. xxxii	28 May 1827
An Act for explaining and amending Three Acts (Note: Clyde Bridge Act 1758 (32 Geo. 2. c. 62)) (Note: Glasgow (Improvement) Act 1768 (8 Geo. 3. c. 16)) (Note: Clyde Navigation Act 1774 (14 Geo. 3. c. 103)) for building a Bridge across the River Clyde, from the City of Glasgow to the Village of Gorbals; and for repairing, widening, and enlarging the Old Bridge across the said River, from the said City to the said Village; and for other Purposes therein mentioned. (Repealed by Glasgow Bridges Act 1845 (8 & 9 Vict. c. cxxxiii))
Westminster and Middlesex Sewers Act 1827	7 & 8 Geo. 4. c. xxxiii	28 May 1827
An Act to empower the Commissioners of Sewers for the City and Liberty of Westminster and Part of the County of Middlesex to purchase certain Premises situate at the Corner of Sun Court in Curzon Street, in the Parish of Saint George Hanover Square, in the said City and Liberty; and for other Purposes relating thereto.
Peterhead Harbours Act 1827 (repealed)	7 & 8 Geo. 4. c. xxxiv	28 May 1827
An Act for more effectually enlarging and improving the Harbours of Peterhead in the County of Aberdeen. (Repealed by Peterhead Harbours Act 1873 (36 & 37 Vict. c. clvii))
Drogheda Port and Harbour Act 1827	7 & 8 Geo. 4. c. xxxv	28 May 1827
An Act to continue and amend Four Acts (Note: Port of Drogheda Act 1790 (30 Geo. 3. c. 39 (I))) (Note: Borough of Drogheda Act 1797 (37 Geo. 3. c. 56 (I))) (Note: Drogheda Harbour Act 1808 (48 Geo. 3. c. cvi)) (Note: Drogheda Harbour Act 1810 (50 Geo. 3. c. x)) for the Improvement of the Port and Harbour of Drogheda, in the County of the Town of Drogheda, and the Counties at Louth and Meath.
Harrington and Toxteth Park Water Act 1827 (repealed)	7 & 8 Geo. 4. c. xxxvi	28 May 1827
An Act to extend the Powers of an Act of His present Majesty, (Note: Liverpool Water Act 1822 (3 Geo. 4. c. lxxvii)) for supplying the Town of Liverpool in the County Palatine of Lancaster with Water, to Harrington and Toxteth Park in the said County. (Repealed by Liverpool Corporation Act 1921 (11 & 12 Geo. 5. c. lxxiv))
Leek Water Act 1827 (repealed)	7 & 8 Geo. 4. c. xxxvii	28 May 1827
An Act for better regulating the Supply of Water in the Town of Leek in the County of Stafford. (Repealed by Staffordshire Potteries Water Board (Leek Urban) Order 1972 (SI 1972/525))
Portsea Island Waterworks Act 1827	7 & 8 Geo. 4. c. xxxviii	28 May 1827
An Act for enabling the Company of Proprietors of the Portsea Island Waterworks to raise a further Sum of Money; and for other Purposes relating to the said Undertaking.
Lambeth, Camberwell and Newington Improvement Act 1827 (repealed)	7 & 8 Geo. 4. c. xxxix	28 May 1827
An Act to explain, amend, and enlarge the Powers and Provisions of an Act made in the last Session of Parliament, intituled "An Act for lighting, watching, cleansing, and otherwise improving the Camberwell New Road, the Lambeth Wyke Estate, and other Places in the Vicinity thereof, in the Parishes of Lambeth, Camberwell, and Newington, in the County of Surrey." (Note: Lambeth, Camberwell and Newington Improvement Act 1826 (7 Geo. 4. c. xxxv)) (Repealed by London Government (Borough of Camberwell) Order in Council 1901 (SR&O 1901/213), London Government (Borough of Lambeth) Order in Council 1901 (SR&O 1901/219) and London Government (Borough of Southwark) Order in Council 1901 (SR&O 1901/275))
Company of Merchants of the City of Edinburgh Act 1827	7 & 8 Geo. 4. c. xl	28 May 1827
An Act to amend an Act for enlarging the Powers of the Company of Merchants of the City of Edinburgh.
Glastonbury Navigation and Canal Act 1827	7 & 8 Geo. 4. c. xli	28 May 1827
An Act for improving and supporting the Navigation of the River Brue, from the Mouth thereof, at its Junction with the River Parrett, to Cripps's House, and for making and constructing a Canal from thence to the Town of Glastonbury in the County of Somerset.
Norwich and Lowestoft Navigation Act 1827	7 & 8 Geo. 4. c. xlii	28 May 1827
An Act for making and maintaining a navigable Communication for Ships and other Vessels between the City of Norwich and the Sea, at or near Lowestoft in the County of Suffolk.
Glasgow Improvement Act 1827	7 & 8 Geo. 4. c. xliii	28 May 1827
An Act for forming a Carriage Road or Drive round the Park or Public Green of Glasgow; and for the better Regulation of the Fire Places and Chimnies of Steam Engines and other Works in the said City and Suburbs.
Golden Square (Westminster) Improvement Act 1827	7 & 8 Geo. 4. c. xliv	28 May 1827
An Act for more effectually improving Golden Square, in the Parish of Saint James Westminster, in the County of Middlesex.
Kentish Town Improvement Act 1827 (repealed)	7 & 8 Geo. 4. c. xlv	28 May 1827
An Act for paving, gravelling, and otherwise improving certain Streets and Places on the East Side of Kentish Town in the Parish of Saint Pancras in the County of Middlesex. (Repealed by London Government (Borough of St. Pancras) Order in Council 1901 (SR&O 1901/274))
Sheffield Markets Act 1827 (repealed)	7 & 8 Geo. 4. c. xlvi	28 May 1827
An Act for removing the Corn, Hay, and Cattle Markets of the Town of Sheffield in the West Riding of the County of York; for erecting a Corn Exchange, and improving the Market Places and regulating the Fairs and Markets of the said Town, and erecting a Bridge there over the River Dun. (Repealed by Sheffield Markets Act 1847 (10 & 11 Vict. c. xlv))
Bedford Level Drainage Act 1827 or the South Level Act 1827 or the South Level Drainage and Navigation Act 1827	7 & 8 Geo. 4. c. xlvii	28 May 1827
An Act for improving the Drainage of Part of the South Level of the Fens within the Great Level commonly called Bedford Level, and the Navigation of the Rivers passing through the same, in the Counties of Cambridge, Suffolk, and Norfolk, and in the Isle of Ely.
Sinfin Moor (Derbyshire) Drains, Bridges and Highways Act 1827	7 & 8 Geo. 4. c. xlviii	28 May 1827
An Act for maintaining and repairing the public Drains, Bridges, and Highways, on certain Extra-parochial Lands formerly called Sinfin Moor, in the County of Derby.
Washingborough Inclosure Act 1827	7 & 8 Geo. 4. c. xlix	28 May 1827
An Act for dividing, inclosing, and exonerating from Tithes the Open and Common Fields, Meadows, Pastures, Fens, Ings, and Waste Lands in the Parish of Washingborough in the County of Lincoln, and Township of Heighington in the same Parish;and also for embanking, draining, and improving certain Lands within the same Parish and Township.
Road from Cavendish Bridge to Hulland Ward (Derbyshire) Act 1827 (repealed)	7 & 8 Geo. 4. c. l	28 May 1827
An Act for more effectually repairing and otherwise improving the Road from the North Side of Cavendish Bridge in the County of Derby to the Town of Derby, and from the said Town to the Guide Post on Hulland Ward in the same County. (Repealed by Cavendish Bridge and Hulland Ward Roads Act 1855 (18 & 19 Vict. c. clxviii))
Roads from Carlisle to Edinburgh and Glasgow Act 1827	7 & 8 Geo. 4. c. li	28 May 1827
An Act for amending, improving, and maintaining in Repair the Road between the Point at which the great Roads from the City of Carlisle to the Cities of Edinburgh and Glasgow respectively separate, and Westlinton Bridge in the County of Cumberland.
Speenhamland and Marlborough Road Act 1827	7 & 8 Geo. 4. c. lii	28 May 1827
An Act for more effectually repairing the Road from Speenhamland in the County of Berks, to Marlborough in the County of Wilts, so far as relates to the Marlborough District of the said Road.
Whitby and Middleton Road Act 1827	7 & 8 Geo. 4. c. liii	28 May 1827
An Act for more effectually repairing and maintaining the Road from Whitby to Middleton, in the County of York.
Road from Dunchurch to Dustan (Warwickshire, Northamptonshire) Act 1827	7 & 8 Geo. 4. c. liv	28 May 1827
An Act for repairing the Road from Dunchurch to Hillmorton in the County of Warwick, and from thence to Saint James's End in the Parish of Duston in the County of Northampton.
Road from Hollinwood to Littleborough (Lancashire) Act 1827 (repealed)	7 & 8 Geo. 4. c. lv	28 May 1827
An Act for making and maintaining a Road from Hollinwood to Littleborough, and other Roads communicating therewith, in the County of Lancaster. (Repealed by Road from Werneth to Littleborough (Lancashire) Act 1830 (11 Geo. 4 & 1 Will. 4. c. xcii))
Spalding and Tydd Goat Road Act 1827	7 & 8 Geo. 4. c. lvi	28 May 1827
An Act for repairing the Road from the High Bridge in Spalding to Tydd Goat in the County of Lincoln, and other Roads in the same County.
Road from Bawtry Bridge to Hainton (Lincolnshire) Act 1827	7 & 8 Geo. 4. c. lvii	28 May 1827
An Act for more effectually amending and improving the Road from Bawtry Bridge in the County of Nottingham to Hainton in the County of Lincoln, and other Roads therein mentioned.
Rotherham and Swinton Turnpike Road (Yorkshire, West Riding) Act 1827 (repealed)	7 & 8 Geo. 4. c. lviii	28 May 1827
An Act for amending, repairing, and maintaining the Turnpike Road from Rotherham to Swinton, in the West Riding of the County of York. (Repealed by Annual Turnpike Acts Continuance Act 1869 (32 & 33 Vict. c. 90))
Road from Blackburn and from Old Accrington Act 1827 (repealed)	7 & 8 Geo. 4. c. lix	28 May 1827
An Act for repairing the Road from Blackburn in the County Palatine of Lancaster to Addingham and Cocking End in the West Riding of the County of York; and for making and maintaining a new Road from Old Accrington to the Burnley and Rochdale Turnpike Road in Habergham Eaves in the said County of Lancaster, and a Branch therefrom. (Repealed by Blackburn and Addingham Turnpike Road Act 1856 (19 & 20 Vict. c. lviii))
Alconbury Hill and Norman Cross Roads (Lincolnshire) Act 1827	7 & 8 Geo. 4. c. lx	28 May 1827
An Act for continuing the Term and altering and enlarging the Powers of several Acts (Note: Alconbury Hill and Norman Cross Roads (Huntingdonshire) Act 1798 (38 Geo. 3. c. xlviii)) (Note: Alconbury Hill and Peterborough Road Act 1819 (59 Geo. 3. c. xxiv)) for repairing the Roads from the Stone Pillar on Alconbury Hill to Wansford Bridge, and from Norman Cross to Peterborough Bridge, all in the County of Huntingdon.
Romsey, Stockbridge and Wallop Roads Act 1827 (repealed)	7 & 8 Geo. 4. c. lxi	28 May 1827
An Act for more effectually repairing the Roads leading from Romsey to Stockbridge and Wallop, and other Roads therein mentioned, in the County of Southampton. (Repealed by Romsey, Stockbridge and Wallop Turnpike Roads Act 1852 (15 & 16 Vict. c. liv))
Road from Frodsham to Appleton (Cheshire) Act 1827	7 & 8 Geo. 4. c. lxii	28 May 1827
An Act for more effectually repairing and improving the Road from Frodsham to the South End of Wilderspool Causeway, within Appleton, in the County Palatine of Chester; and for making and maintaining a certain Extension or new Branch of Road to communicate therewith.
Rochdale, Bamford, Birtle and Bury Road Act 1827 (repealed)	7 & 8 Geo. 4. c. lxiii	28 May 1827
An Act for more effectually repairing the Road from Rochdale through Bamford and Birtle to Bury, and several other Roads therein mentioned, all in the County Palatine of Lancaster. (Repealed by Rochdale and Bury Turnpike Road Act 1850 (13 & 14 Vict. c. lxxxvii))
Standedge and Oldham Road Act 1827 (repealed)	7 & 8 Geo. 4. c. lxiv	28 May 1827
An Act for more effectually repairing and improving the Road from Standedge in Saddleworth in the County of York, to Oldham in the County of Lancaster, and other Roads in the said County of York, and for making and maintaining Two new Branches to communicate therewith. (Repealed by Standedge and Oldham Road Act 1863 (26 & 27 Vict. c. cl))
Kilcullen and Carlow Road Act 1827	7 & 8 Geo. 4. c. lxv	28 May 1827
An Act for more effectually repairing the Road leading from the Town of Kilcullen in the County of Kildare to the Town of Carlow.
Dublin, Slane and Drogheda Road Act 1827 (repealed)	7 & 8 Geo. 4. c. lxvi	28 May 1827
An Act for repairing and improving the Road from Dublin, by Ashbourne, to Slane and Drogheda. (Repealed by Dublin, Ashbourne, Slane and Drogheda Roads Act 1849 (12 & 13 Vict. c. lxviii))
Road from Barton Waterside House (Lincolnshire) Act 1827	7 & 8 Geo. 4. c. lxvii	28 May 1827
An Act for repairing the Road from Barton Waterside House, to Riseham Hedge Corner, and other Roads in the County of Lincoln, connected therewith.
Manchester and Hyde Lane Bridge Road Act 1827 (repealed)	7 & 8 Geo. 4. c. lxviii	28 May 1827
An Act for more effectually repairing and otherwise improving the Road from the End of Ardwick Green near Manchester, in the County Palatine of Lancaster, to Hyde Lane Bridge, in the County Palatine of Chester. (Repealed by Manchester and Mottram Road Act 1833 (3 & 4 Will. 4. c. xviii))
Road from Ealand to Leeds Act 1827 (repealed)	7 & 8 Geo. 4. c. lxix	28 May 1827
An Act for repairing the Road leading from Ealand to the Town of Leeds, in the West Riding of the County of York. (Repealed by Leeds and Ealand Road Act 1861 (24 & 25 Vict. c. lxxxviii))
Road from Buckstones to Barkisland and Elland Bridge (Yorkshire) Act 1827 (repealed)	7 & 8 Geo. 4. c. lxx	28 May 1827
An Act for more effectually making, amending, and improving the Road from Buck Stones to Barkisland School, at the Highway leading from Ripponden to Stainland; and for making and maintaining an Extension of the said Road to join the Halifax and Huddersfield Turnpike Road at the South End of Elland Bridge, and a Branch therefrom; all in the West Riding of the County of York. (Repealed by Buckstones and Elland, and Sykehouse and Stainland Roads Act 1838 (1 & 2 Vict. c. xxxix))
Northampton and Cold Brayfield Road Act 1827	7 & 8 Geo. 4. c. lxxi	28 May 1827
An Act for making and maintaining a Road from the Town of Northampton, in the County of Northampton, to Cold Brayfield, in the County of Buckingham.
Barnsdale and Thwaite Gate, and Leeds and Wakefield Roads Act 1827 (repealed)	7 & 8 Geo. 4. c. lxxii	28 May 1827
An Act to alter, amend, and enlarge the Powers and Provisions of an Act (Note: Barnsdale and Thwaite Gate Turnpike Road Act 1819 (59 Geo. 3. c. lxxxi)) relating to the Road from Barnsdale through Pontefract, to Thwaite Gate, near Leeds, and also of an Act (Note: Road from Leeds to Wakefield Act 1821 (1 & 2 Geo. 4. c. v)) relating to the Road from Leeds to Wakefield, in the West Riding of the County of York. (Repealed by Barnsdale and Leeds Turnpike Road Act 1856 (19 & 20 Vict. c. xliii))
Road from Creed to Ruan Lanehorne (Cornwall) Act 1827	7 & 8 Geo. 4. c. lxxiii	28 May 1827
An Act for more effectually improving the Road from Creed to Ruan Lanehorne, and from Dennis Water to Trethim Mill, in the County of Cornwall.
Road from Loughborough to Cavendish Bridge Act 1827 (repealed)	7 & 8 Geo. 4. c. lxxiv	28 May 1827
An Act for more effectually repairing the Road from the South East End of the Town of Loughborough, in the County of Leicester, commencing at South Field Lane, to the South End of Cavendish Bridge, in the same County, (Repealed by Annual Turnpike Acts Continuance Act 1884 (47 & 48 Vict. c. 52))
Thames Watermen and Lightermen Act 1827 (repealed)	7 & 8 Geo. 4. c. lxxv	14 June 1827
An Act for the better Regulation of the Watermen and Lightermen on the River Thames, between Yantlet Creek and Windsor. (Repealed by Watermen's and Lightermen's Amendment Act 1859 (22 & 23 Vict. c. cxxxiii))
Edinburgh Improvement Act 1827	7 & 8 Geo. 4. c. lxxvi	14 June 1827
An Act for carrying into Effect certain Improvements within the City of Edinburgh and adjacent to the same.
Ashton-under-Lyne Improvement Act 1827 (repealed)	7 & 8 Geo. 4. c. lxxvii	14 June 1827
An Act for lighting, cleansing, watching, and otherwise improving the Town of Ashton-under-Lyne in the County Palatine of Lancaster, and for regulating the Police thereof. (Repealed by Ashton-under-Lyne Improvement Act 1849 (12 & 13 Vict. c. xxxv))
Whitby Piers and Harbour Act 1827	7 & 8 Geo. 4. c. lxxviii	14 June 1827
An Act for the more effectual repairing, maintaining, and improving the Piers and Harbour of the Town and Port of Whitby, in the County of York.
Boston Port and Harbour Act 1827	7 & 8 Geo. 4. c. lxxix	14 June 1827
An Act to extend and enlarge the Powers of an Act passed in the Fifty second Year of His late Majesty (Note: Boston Port and Harbour Act 1812 (52 Geo. 3. c. cv)) for improving the Port and Harbour of Boston in the County of Lincoln.
Ardglass Harbour Act 1827 (repealed)	7 & 8 Geo. 4. c. lxxx	14 June 1827
An Act for maintaining and improving the Harbour of Ardglass in the County of Down. (Repealed by Northern Ireland Fishery Harbour Authority Order (Northern Ireland) 1973 (SR&O(NI) 1973/35))
Trent and Mersey Canal Act 1827 (repealed)	7 & 8 Geo. 4. c. lxxxi	14 June 1827
An Act for enabling the Company of Proprietors of the Navigation from the Trent to the Mersey to make Two Branches or Cuts from and out of the same Navigation, and for further amending the Acts (Note: Trent and Mersey Canal Act 1766 (6 Geo. 3. c. 96)) (Note: Trent and Mersey Canal Act 1770 (10 Geo. 3. c. 102)) (Note: Trent and Mersey Canal Act 1775 (15 Geo. 3. c. 20)) (Note: Trent and Mersey Canal Act 1776 (16 Geo. 3. c. 32)) (Note: Trent and Mersey Canal Act 1783 (23 Geo. 3. c. 33)) (Note: Caldon Canal Act 1797 (37 Geo. 3. c. 36)) (Note: Trent and Mersey Canal Act 1797 (37 Geo. 3. c. 81)) (Note: Trent and Mersey Canal (Railways) Act 1802 (42 Geo. 3. c. xxv)) (Note: Trent and Mersey Canal Act 1809 (49 Geo. 3. c. lxxiii)) (Note: Trent and Mersey Navigation Act 1823 (4 Geo. 4. c. lxxxvii)) (Note: Macclesfield Canal Act 1826 (7 Geo. 4. c. xxx)) of the said Company. (Repealed by Trent and Mersey Canal Act 1831 (1 Will. 4. c. lv))
Nottingham Water Act 1827 (repealed)	7 & 8 Geo. 4. c. lxxxii	14 June 1827
An Act for more effectually supplying with Water the Inhabitants of the Town and County of the Town of Nottingham, and the Neighbourhood thereof. (Repealed by Nottingham Waterworks Act 1845 (8 & 9 Vict. c. xix))
Shrewsbury Water Act 1827 (repealed)	7 & 8 Geo. 4. c. lxxxiii	14 June 1827
An Act for supplying with Water the Town and Suburbs of Shrewsbury, in the County of Salop. (Repealed by Shrewsbury Waterworks Act 1856 (19 & 20 Vict. c. xlii))
Huddersfield Water Act 1827	7 & 8 Geo. 4. c. lxxxiv	14 June 1827
An Act for supplying with Water the Town and Neighbourhood of Huddersfield, in the West Riding of the County of York.
Nene Outfall Act 1827	7 & 8 Geo. 4. c. lxxxv	14 June 1827
An Act for improving the Outfall of the River Nene, and the Drainage of the Lands discharging their Waters into the Wisbech River, and the Navigation of the said Wisbech River from the upper End of Kinderley's Cut to the Sea; and for embanking the Salt Marshes and Dare Sands lying between the said Cut and the Sea.
Carlisle Improvement Act 1827	7 & 8 Geo. 4. c. lxxxvi	14 June 1827
An Act for watching regulating and improving the City of Carlisle, and the Suburbs thereof.
Glasgow, Paisley and Ardrossan Canal and Railway Act 1827	7 & 8 Geo. 4. c. lxxxvii	14 June 1827
An Act to amend an Act of the Forty sixth Year of the Reign of His late Majesty, (Note: Glasgow, Paisley and Ardrossan Canal Act 1806 (46 Geo. 3. c. lxxv)) incorporating the Glasgow, Paisley, and Ardrossan Canal Company; and to empower the said Company to form a Railway from Johnstone in the County of Renfrew to Ardrossan in the County of Ayr, and certain Branch Railways communicating therewith.
Garnkirk and Glasgow Railway Act 1827	7 & 8 Geo. 4. c. lxxxviii	14 June 1827
An Act for altering and amending the Garnkirk and Glasgow Railway Act. (Note: Garnkirk and Glasgow Railway Act 1826 (7 Geo. 4. c. ciii))
St. Marylebone Parish Act 1827 (repealed)	7 & 8 Geo. 4. c. lxxxix	14 June 1827
An Act for removing Doubts as to the Legality of the Erection of the Portico of the Parish Church of the Parish of Saint Mary-le-bone in the County of Middlesex; for declaring the whole of the Site of Trinity Church to be within the said Parish; and for altering the Boundary between the said Parish and the Parish of Saint Pancras. (Repealed by London Government (Borough of St. Marylebone) Order in Council 1901 (SR&O 1901/272))
Exbury and Lepe Church Act 1827	7 & 8 Geo. 4. c. xc	14 June 1827
An Act for substituting a Building lately erected by William Mitford Esquire, deceased, as the future Church or Chapel of Exbury and Lepe in the County of Southampton, in lieu of the present Church or Chapel, and for other Purposes relating thereto.
St. John Hampstead Parish Church Act 1827	7 & 8 Geo. 4. c. xci	14 June 1827
An Act for providing the Inhabitants of the Parish of Saint John Hampstead, in the County of Middlesex, with increased Accommodation for attending Divine Service.
Wisbech Chapel of Ease Act 1827	7 & 8 Geo. 4. c. xcii	14 June 1827
An Act for erecting and endowing a Chapel of Ease in the Parish of Wisbech Saint Peter's in the Isle of Ely, in the County of Cambridge.
Dundee Two Pennies Scots Act 1827 (repealed)	7 & 8 Geo. 4. c. xciii	14 June 1827
An Act for enlarging the Term and Powers granted by several Acts (Note: Dundee Beer Duties Act 1707 (c. 80 (S))) (Note: Dundee Beer Duties Act 1730 (4 Geo. 2. c. 11)) (Note: Dundee Beer Duties Act 1746 (20 Geo. 2. c. 17)) (Note: Dundee Beer Duties Act 1776 (16 Geo. 3. c. 16)) (Note: Dundee Two Pennies Scots Act 1802 (42 Geo. 3. c. xxvii)) for levying a Duty of Two Pennies Scots upon every Pint of Ale and Beer brewed or vended within the Town of Dundee, and the Liberties and Suburbs thereof, and for amending the said Acts. (Repealed by Statute Law (Repeals) Act 2013 (c. 2))
River Dun Drainage Act 1827	7 & 8 Geo. 4. c. xciv	14 June 1827
An Act for draining embanking and protecting certain Low Lands lying on the North Side of the River Dun, in the West Riding of the County of York.
Road from Crossford Bridge to Altrincham (Cheshire) Act 1827	7 & 8 Geo. 4. c. xcv	14 June 1827
An Act for more effectually repairing and otherwise improving the Road from Crossford Bridge in the County Palatine of Lancaster, to Altrincham in the County Palatine of Chester.
Stirling and Drymen Bridge Road Act 1827	7 & 8 Geo. 4. c. xcvi	14 June 1827
An Act for altering and maintaining the Road from Stirling to Drymen Bridge, in the Counties of Stirling and Perth.
Redrow and Peathill Roads (Stirlingshire) Act 1827	7 & 8 Geo. 4. c. xcvii	14 June 1827
An Act for amending an Act of the Fourth Year of the Reign of His present Majesty, (Note: Roads from Redrow to Peathill (Stirlingshire) Act 1823 (4 Geo. 4. c. cxii)) for making and repairing certain Roads from Redrow to Peathill in the County of Stirling; and for making and maintaining certain new Roads connected therewith.
Roads in Glamorgan Act 1827 (repealed)	7 & 8 Geo. 4. c. xcviii	14 June 1827
An Act for the better and more effectually repairing and otherwise improving the Roads in the County of Glamorgan. (Repealed by Turnpike Trusts in South Wales Act 1844 (7 & 8 Vict. c. 91))
Roads from York and from Grimston Act 1827	7 & 8 Geo. 4. c. xcix	14 June 1827
An Act for repairing the Road from the City of York to Kexby Bridge, and from Grimston to the Upper End of Stone Dale, in the County of York.
Wooton-under-edge and Wickwar Roads (Gloucestershire, Wiltshire) Act 1827 (repealed)	7 & 8 Geo. 4. c. c	14 June 1827
An Act for making and maintaining a Turnpike Road from Wooton-under-Edge through Kingswood to Wickwar, and Branch Roads therefrom, all in the Counties of Gloucester and Wilts. (Repealed by Kingswood District of Roads Act 1854 (17 & 18 Vict. c. xxi))
Callington Roads (Cornwall) Act 1827	7 & 8 Geo. 4. c. ci	14 June 1827
An Act for repairing and improving certain Roads leading to and from Callington in the County of Cornwall.
Ellesmere and Chester Canal Act 1827	7 & 8 Geo. 4. c. cii	21 June 1827
An Act to amend and enlarge the Powers and Provisions of the several Acts (Note: Chester Canal Act 1772 (12 Geo. 3. c. 75)) (Note: Chester Canal Act 1777 (17 Geo. 3. c. 67)) (Note: Chester Canal Act 1778 (18 Geo. 3. c. 21)) (Note: Ellesmere and Chester Canal Act 1793 (33 Geo. 3. c. 91)) (Note: Ellesmere and Chester Canal Act 1796 (36 Geo. 3. c. 71)) (Note: Ellesmere and Chester Canal (No. 2) Act 1796 (36 Geo. 3. c. 96)) (Note: Ellesmere and Chester Canal Act 1801 (41 Geo. 3. (U.K.) c. lxx)) (Note: Ellesmere and Chester Canal Act 1802 (42 Geo. 3. c. xx)) (Note: Ellesmere Canal, Railway and Water Supply Act 1804 (44 Geo. 3. c. liv)) (Note: Ellesmere Canal (Whitchurch Extension) Act 1810 (50 Geo. 3. c. xxiv)) (Note: Ellesmere and Chester Canals Unification Act 1813 (53 Geo. 3. c. lxxx)) relating to the Ellesmere and Chester Canal Navigation.
Portrush Harbour Act 1827	7 & 8 Geo. 4. c. ciii	21 June 1827
An Act for improving the Harbour of Portrush in the County of Antrim.
Dunbar Harbour, Improvement and Water Act 1827	7 & 8 Geo. 4. c. civ	21 June 1827
An Act for the further Improvement and Maintenance of the Harbour of Dunbar, and other Public Works within the Burgh of Dunbar, and for the better supplying the said Burgh with Water.
Kinross and Fife Drainage and Water Supply Act 1827	7 & 8 Geo. 4. c. cv	21 June 1827
An Act for recovering, draining, and preserving certain Lands in the Parishes of Kinross, Orwell, and Portmoak, in the County of Kinross, and in the Parishes of Ballingry, Auchterderran, and Kinglassie, in the County of Fife; and for the better supplying with Water the Mills, Manufactories, Bleachfields, and other Works situated on or near the River of Leven in the said County of Fife.
Parish of Ramsgate Act 1827	7 & 8 Geo. 4. c. cvi	21 June 1827
An Act for separating the Town or Vill of Ramsgate in the County of Kent from the Parish of Saint Laurence, and making the same a distinct Parish; and for completing the new Church now building therein; and for other Purposes relating thereto; and for altering and amending an Act of His late Majesty (Note: Ramsgate Chapel of Ease Act 1790 (30 Geo. 3. c. 64)) for establishing a Chapel therein.
Staines Parish Church, Burial Ground and Rates Act 1827	7 & 8 Geo. 4. c. cvii	21 June 1827
An Act for taking down and rebuilding the Parish Church of Staines in the County of Middlesex; for providing an additional Burial Ground; and for equalizing the Church Rates of the said Parish.
Stratford Langthorne Abbey (Roads and Bridges Maintenance) Act 1827 (repealed)	7 & 8 Geo. 4. c. cviii	21 June 1827
An Act to enable the Persons interested in the Lands and Hereditaments, heretofore Parcel of the Possessions of the Monastery or Abbey of Stratford Langthorne in the County of Essex, to raise Money for repairing and maintaining the Bridges and other Works, liable to be repaired and maintained by such Persons. (Repealed by West Ham Local Board of Health Act 1876 (39 & 40 Vict. c. ccxx))
Ayr (County) Turnpike Roads Act 1827 (repealed)	7 & 8 Geo. 4. c. cix	21 June 1827
An Act for repairing and keeping in Repair the Turnpike Roads in the County of Ayr; for making and maintaining certain New Roads; for rendering Turnpike certain Parish Roads; and for regulating the Statute Labour in the said County. (Repealed by Ayrshire Roads Act 1847 (10 & 11 Vict. c. ccxiii))
Christ Church Doncaster Act 1827	7 & 8 Geo. 4. c. cx	23 June 1827
An Act for erecting a Church in the Parish of Doncaster in the West Riding of the County of York.
Cambridge Gaol Act 1827 (repealed)	7 & 8 Geo. 4. c. cxi	23 June 1827
An Act for building a new Gaol for the Town of Cambridge, and for other Purposes connected therewith. (Repealed by Statute Law (Repeals) Act 2008 (c. 12))
Leith Municipal Government Act 1827 or the Leith Police Act 1827 (repealed)	7 & 8 Geo. 4. c. cxii	2 July 1827
An Act to provide for the Municipal Government of the Town and Suburbs of Leith; for the further Administration of Justice; and for the Regulation of the Police therein. (Repealed by Leith Municipal and Police Act 1848 (11 & 12 Vict. c. cxxiii))

=== Private acts ===
Short title	Citation	Royal assent
Long title
Hampton Inclosure Act 1827	7 & 8 Geo. 4. c. 1 Pr.	21 March 1827
An Act for inclosing Lands in the Township of Hampton in the Parish of Malpas in the County of Chester.
Ham Inclosure Act 1827	7 & 8 Geo. 4. c. 2 Pr.	21 March 1827
An Act for inclosing Lands in the Parish of Ham in the County of Wilts.
Stainsby and Heath Inclosure Act 1827	7 & 8 Geo. 4. c. 3 Pr.	21 March 1827
An Act for dividing, allotting, and inclosing the several Commons und Waste Grounds, within the Manor of Stainsby and Heath, in the Parishes of Ault Hucknall and Heath, in the County of Derby.
See of Bath and Wells Estate Act 1827	7 & 8 Geo. 4. c. 4 Pr.	2 April 1827
An Act to carry into Execution a Contract entered into between the Lord Bishop of Bath and Wells, and Rickard Beadon Enquire for the Sale of the Manor of Wiveliscombe alias Wilscombe in tho County of Somerset, unto tho said Richard Beadon; and for applying the Money to arise from such Sale in the Purchase of Other Estates, to be settled in lieu thereof.
Wright's Estate Act 1827	7 & 8 Geo. 4. c. 5 Pr.	2 April 1827
An Act to give Powers of Sale over Part of the Estates devised by the Will of John Wright, formerly of Lombard Street in the City of London, Banker, and afterwards of Esher in the County of Surrey Esquire, for the Purpose of obtaining a more connected and convenient Estate, to be settled to the existing Uses of his Will.
Stewart's Estate Act 1827	7 & 8 Geo. 4. c. 6 Pr.	2 April 1827
An Act for vesting in Fee Simple in Sir George Stewart of Grandtully, Baronet, or the Heir of Entail in Possession, certain Parts of the entailed Estate of Grandtully in the County of Perth, upon entailing certain other Lands in the said County, equivalent in Value thereto; and in feuing certain other Parts of the said entailed Estate.
Thursford and Kettkestone Inclosure Act 1827	7 & 8 Geo. 4. c. 7 Pr.	12 April 1827
An Act for dividing, allotting, and inclosing Lands within the Parishes of Thursford and Kettkestone in the County of Norfolk.
Hedley's Estate Act 1827	7 & 8 Geo. 4. c. 8 Pr.	28 May 1827
An Act for vesting an undivided Part belonging to James Hedley, an Infant, of real Estates devised by Mary Stocks spinster, in Trustees, to be sold; and for applying the purchase Money thence arising for the Benefit of the Infant.
Hulme's Estate Act 1827	7 & 8 Geo. 4. c. 9 Pr.	28 May 1827
An Act to enable the Trustees of the Estates devised by William Hulme esquire, to appropriate certain parts of accumulated Funds arising from the said estates in the purchase of Advowsons; and for other the purposes therein mentioned.
Exeter Cathedral Estate Act 1827	7 & 8 Geo. 4. c. 10 Pr.	28 May 1827
An Act for vesting in the Dean and Chapter of the Cathedral Church of Saint Peter in Exeter, certain Messuages and Lands situate within the Close of the said Cathedral Church, belonging to the Archdeaconries of Totnes, Barnstaple, and Cornwall, founded in the said Cathedral Church, in consideration of certain perpetual yearly Sums to be payable to the said several Archdeacons and their Successors and for enabling the said Dean and Chapter to grant Leases of the same Premises.
Cauvin's Hospital Edinburgh Act 1827	7 & 8 Geo. 4. c. 11 Pr.	28 May 1827
An Act to explain and modify the Trust Settlement of the late Louis Cauvin, for the Endowment and Maintenance of an Hospital for the Support and Education of Boys.
Lord and Lady Saye and Sele's, &c. Estate Act 1827	7 & 8 Geo. 4. c. 12 Pr.	28 May 1827
An Act for discharging Estates of Lord and Lady Say and Sele, and the Honourable William Thomas Twistleton Fiennes, Sir Culling Smith Baronet, and Culling Eardley Smith Esquire, and the Honourable Selena Childers, and John Walbanke Childers Esquire, from a perpetual Rent of Two thousand Pounds, extending over such Estates, and charging a Part of each divided Estate with a Rent equal to its Portion of the said Rent of Two thousand Pounds.
Westkirkby Inclosure Act 1827	7 & 8 Geo. 4. c. 13 Pr.	28 May 1827
An Act for inclosing, dividing, and allotting Lands within the Township of Westkirkby in the Parish of Westkirkby in the County Palatine of Chester.
Shepley Inclosure Act 1827	7 & 8 Geo. 4. c. 14 Pr.	28 May 1827
An Act for inclosing Lands in the Township of Shepley, in the Parish of Kirkburton in the West Riding of the County of York.
Beckley Inclosure Act 1827	7 & 8 Geo. 4. c. 15 Pr.	28 May 1827
An Act for inclosing Lands in the Parish of Beckley in the County of Oxford.
Bentley and Arksey Inclosure Act 1827	7 & 8 Geo. 4. c. 16 Pr.	28 May 1827
An Act for dividing, allotting, and inclosing, and for exonerating from Tithes, Lands within the Townships of Bentley and Arksey in the Parish of Arksey in the West Riding of the County of York.
Huntingdon's Estate Act 1827	7 & 8 Geo. 4. c. 17 Pr.	28 May 1827
An Act for rendering more eflfectual Two several Acts of the Forty fifth and the Forty seventh Years of the Reign of His late Majesty King George the Third, intituled, respectively, "An Act for inclosing and draining certain Lands in the Parishes of Winterton, East Somerton, and West Somerton, in the County of Norfolk;" (Note: Winterton and East and West Somerton Inclosure and Drainage Act 1805 (45 Geo. 3. c. viii)) and "An Art for inclosing and draining certain Lands in the Parish of Martham in the County of Norfolk;" (Note: Martham Inclosure and Drainage Act 1807 (47 Geo. 3 Sess. 1. c. xxxix)) so far as regards the Estates of John Barker Huntingdon Esquire.
Great Grimsby Inclosure Act 1827 (repealed)	7 & 8 Geo. 4. c. 18 Pr.	28 May 1827
An Act for dividing, inclosing, and exonerating from Tithes Lands in the Parish of Great Grimsby in the County of Lincoln. (Repealed by Humberside Act 1982 (c. iii))
Ruscombe Inclosure Act 1827	7 & 8 Geo. 4. c. 19 Pr.	28 May 1827
An Act for inclosing Lands in the Parish of Ruscombe in the County of Berks.
Burwardsley Inclosure Act 1827	7 & 8 Geo. 4. c. 20 Pr.	28 May 1827
An Act for inclosing, dividing, and allotting Lands in the Township of Burwardesley otherwise Burwardsley in the Parish of Bunbury in the County Palatine of Chester.
Grappenhall Tithes Act 1827	7 & 8 Geo. 4. c. 21 Pr.	28 May 1827
An Act to commute for a Corn Rent the Tithes and Dues payable to the Rector of the Parish and Parish Church of Grappenhall in the County Palatine of Chester.
Eversfield's Estate Act 1827	7 & 8 Geo. 4. c. 22 Pr.	14 June 1827
An Act to enable Trustees to grant Building Leases of Lands in the several parishes of St. Leonard's Hollington, St. Mary of the Castle of Hastings Maudlin, St. Mary Magdalen, St. Michael near Hastings, and Horsham, in the county of Sussex, part of the Estates devised by the Will of Charles Eversfield esquire, and to sell the same Lands, and also two detached Farms in the parishes of Hollington and Horsham aforesaid, other part of the same Estates; and for laying out the Money arising by such Sale in the purchase of other Estates, to be settled to the same uses.
Leech's Estate Act 1827	7 & 8 Geo. 4. c. 23 Pr.	14 June 1827
An Act for enabling the Trustees of the undivided Moiety, late of John Leech deceased, in certain Land in the town of Manchester, to concur with the Parties entitled to the other Moiety thereof; in making Partition thereof and to sell all or any part of the said Land in the said town of Manchester, in consideration of perpetual Chief Rents to be reserved issuing out of such Land.
Blackall's Estate and Cutler Boulter's Charity Act 1827	7 & 8 Geo. 4. c. 24 Pr.	14 June 1827
An Act to effect an Exchange of Estates in the county of Oxford, between John Blackall esquire and the Trustees of Cutler Boulter's Charity, near the city of Oxford.
Marquess of Bute's Estate Act 1827	7 & 8 Geo. 4. c. 25 Pr.	14 June 1827
An Act for vesting in Fee Simple in John Crichton Marquess of Bute and Earl of Dumfries, and his Heirs and Assigns, certain Parts of the entailed Estate of the late William Earl of Dumfries and Stair, situated in the County of Wigton, upon entailing certain other Lands belonging to him, situated in the County of Ayr, in lieu of the Lands so to be vested.
Moncreiffe's Estate Act 1827	7 & 8 Geo. 4. c. 26 Pr.	14 June 1827
An Act for vesting in Trustees the Lands of Dunkirk or West Park, of Moncreiffe in the County of Perth, contained in a Deed of Entail made by Sir William Moncreiffe of Moncreiffe Baronet, deceased, to sell the same, and apply the Price obtained therefor in Payment of the Debts that affect or may be made to affect the same.
Duke of Dorset's Estate Act 1827	7 & 8 Geo. 4. c. 27 Pr.	14 June 1827
An Act for vesting certain real Estates, late of the Most Noble John Frederick Duke of Dorset, deceased, situate in the borough town and parish of East Grinstead, in the county of Sussex, in Trustees, upon trust to sell the same, and to lay out the Money thence arising in the Purchase of other Estates, to be settled to the same Uses as the Estates so sold.
Mary Vessey's, Henry Machin's and Elizabeth Reynold's Estates Act 1827	7 & 8 Geo. 4. c. 28 Pr.	14 June 1827
An Act for confirming a Partition made by Mary Vessey spinster, and Henry Machin esquire, with Elizabeth Reynolds widow, of the Manor of Howell, and divers Messuages, Farms, Lands, Tenements, and Hereditaments, situate in Howell and Asgarby, or one of them, in the county of Lincoln.
Gabriel Powell's Estate Act 1827	7 & 8 Geo. 4. c. 29 Pr.	14 June 1827
An Act for vesting part of the Estates devised by the Will of Gabriel Powell esquire, deceased, in Trustees, to be sold, and for investing the Money to arise from such Sale in the Purchase of other Estates, to be settled to the same Uses.
Enabling Robert Oliver and Sarah Shepley, and their issue, to grant building leases of land in Middlesex, devised by the will of Henry Barker.	7 & 8 Geo. 4. c. 30 Pr.	14 June 1827
An Act to enable Robert Oliver Esquire, and Sarah Shepley his Wife, and the Survivor of them, and their Issue, to grant Building Leases of a Moiety of certain Lands and Premises in the County of Middlesex, devised by the Will of Henry Barker deceased.
Harrow School Estates Act 1827	7 & 8 Geo. 4. c. 31 Pr.	14 June 1827
An Act for confirming certain Leases granted under an Act passed in the Forty third Year of the Reign of His late Majesty King George the Third, intituled "An Act for enabling the Keepers and Governors of the Possessions, Revenues, and Goods of the Free Grammar School of John Lyon, within the Tomn of Harrrow-on-the-Hill in the County of Middlesex, in grant Building Leases of certain of the Grounds and Estates of the said John Lyon;" (Note: John Lyon's Estate Act 1803 (43 Geo. 3. c. 104 Pr.)) and for amending the same Act.
Vesting an estate at Teddesley Hay (Staffordshire) in trustees, to be sold for the discharge of a mortgage.	7 & 8 Geo. 4. c. 32 Pr.	14 June 1827
An Act for vesting an Estate in the Extra-parochial Place of Teddesley, otherwise Teddesley Hay, in the County of Stafford, in Trustees, to be sold, and for applying the Purchase Money in discharge of a Mortgage affecting said Estate.
Sheffield Town Trustees Act 1827	7 & 8 Geo. 4. c. 33 Pr.	14 June 1827
An Act for facilitating the Execution of certain Trusts for Charitable and Public Purposes, within the Town of Sheffield in the County of York.
Little Houghton, Brafield-on-the-Green and Cooknoe (Northampton) inclosure.	7 & 8 Geo. 4. c. 34 Pr.	14 June 1827
An Act for inclosing Lands in the several Parishes of Little Houghton, Brafield-on-the-Green, and Cooknoe, otherwise Cogenhoe, in the County of Northampton.
Penge Inclosure Act 1827	7 & 8 Geo. 4. c. 35 Pr.	14 June 1827
An Act for dividing, allotting, inclosing, and exonerating from Tithes, Lands in the Hamlet of Penge, in the Parish of Battersea in the County of Surrey.
Langford Inclosure Act 1827	7 & 8 Geo. 4. c. 36 Pr.	14 June 1827
An Act for inclosing and exonerating from Tithes Lands in the Parish of Langford in the County of Bedford.
Nowton Inclosure Act 1827	7 & 8 Geo. 4. c. 37 Pr.	14 June 1827
An Act for inclosing Lands in the Pariah of Nowton in the County of Suffolk.
Englefield Inclosure Act 1827	7 & 8 Geo. 4. c. 38 Pr.	14 June 1827
An Act for extending and enlarging the Powers of an Act of the Forty ninth Year of His late Majesty, (Note: Englefield Inclosure Act 1809 (49 Geo. 3. c. 39 Pr.)) for inclosing Lands in the Manor and Parish of Englefield in the County of Berks.
Tangley Inclosure Act 1827	7 & 8 Geo. 4. c. 39 Pr.	14 June 1827
An Act for inclosing Lands in the Parisb of Tangley in the County of Southampton.
Beaumont and Kirkandrews-upon-Eden (Cumberland): abolition of tithes and provision of compensation.	7 & 8 Geo. 4. c. 40 Pr.	14 June 1827
An Act for abolishing the Great and Small Tithes belonging to the Rectory of the united Parishes of Beaumont and Kirkandrews-upon-Eden, in the County of Cumberland and Diocese of Carlisle, and for making Compensation in lieu thereof.
Stoke-upon-Trent Rectory Act 1827	7 & 8 Geo. 4. c. 41 Pr.	21 June 1827
An Act to authorize a Sale to the respective Land Owners of all Tithes and Rectorial Dues belonging to the Rectory of Stoke-upon-Trent in the County of Stafford; for endowing Two new Churches; and for other Purposes.
See of Durham's Estate Act 1827	7 & 8 Geo. 4. c. 42 Pr.	21 June 1827
An Act for vesting certain Estates belonging to the See of Durham in Trustees for Sale, and for applying the Purchase Monies in the Purchase of Freehold and Copyhold Estates to be annexed to the said See, and for other Purposes.
Bulwer's Estate Act 1827	7 & 8 Geo. 4. c. 43 Pr.	21 June 1827
An Act to authorize the Trustees of the Manors and Hereditaments devised and settled by the Will of William Earle Bulwer Esquire, to raise Money to discharge Incumbrances affecting the same.
Campbell's Estate Act 1827	7 & 8 Geo. 4. c. 44 Pr.	21 June 1827
An Act to empower the Judges of the Court of Session in Scotland to sell such Part of the entailed Lands and Estate in the County of Argyle, now belonging to Charles Campbell Esquire of Combie, as shall be sufficient for the Payment of the Debts and Burdens affecting the same.
Vicar of Saint Werburgh's Estate Act 1827	7 & 8 Geo. 4. c. 45 Pr.	21 June 1827
An Act to confirm an Exchange made of certain Parts of the Lands belonging to the Vicar of Saint Werburgh in the County of Derby.
Earl of Moray's Estate Act 1827	7 & 8 Geo. 4. c. 46 Pr.	21 June 1827
An Act for settling and securing the Lands of Letham and Cullelo, in the County of Fife, to and in favour of Francis Earl of Moray, and the respective Series of Heirs under Two Deeds of Entail made by Charles Earl of Moray and Francis Earl of Moray respectively, and under the Conditions and Limitations contained therein; and for vesting in lieu thereof the Lands of Restalrig in the County of Mid-Lothian, and the Mill Lands of Aberdour in the said County of Fife, in the said Francis Earl of Moray, and his Heirs and Assignees, in Fee Simple.
David Griffith's Estate Act 1827	7 & 8 Geo. 4. c. 47 Pr.	21 June 1827
An Act to authorize the leasing of Mines and Hereditaments in the parish of Llangonoyd in the county of Glamorgan, devised and settled by the Will of David Griffith.
Duke of Beaufort's and Marquis of Worcester's Estates Act 1827	7 & 8 Geo. 4. c. 48 Pr.	21 June 1827
An Act for confirming a Lease granted by the Most Noble Henry Charles Duke of Beaufort, and the Right Honourable Henry Somerset commonly called Marquis of Worcester, of Lands and Hereditaments in the parish of Swansea in the county of Glamorgan.
See of Bangor Estate Act 1827	7 & 8 Geo. 4. c. 49 Pr.	21 June 1827
An Act for carrying into effect an Agreement for Sale of certain Messuages or Tenements and Parcels of Ground in the parish of St. Andrew Holborn in the county of Middlesex, Part of the Possessions of the See of Bangor, and for applying the Money arising therefrom in manner therein mentioned.
Archbishop of Canterbury's Estate Act 1827	7 & 8 Geo. 4. c. 50 Pr.	21 June 1827
An Act to explain and amend certain Acts passed in the Forty seventh (Note: See of Canterbury's Estate Act 1807 (47 Geo. 3 Sess. 2. c. cxxviii)) and Fifty first (Note: See of Canterbury's Estates (Deal and Cliffe) Act 1811 (51 Geo. 3. c. cxxxvi)) Years of the Reign of His late Majesty, and in the First (Note: See of Canterbury's Estates Act 1820 (1 Geo. 4. c. 48 Pr.)) and Fifth (Note: See of Canterbury Estates Act 1824 (5 Geo. 4. c. 37 Pr.)) Years of the Reign of His present Majesty, for enabling the Archbishop of Canterbury to grant Building and Repairing Leases.
Robert Nicholas's Estate Act 1827	7 & 8 Geo. 4. c. 51 Pr.	21 June 1827
An Act for vesting in Trustees for Sale, the Estates devised by the Will of the late Robert Nicholas Esquire.
Dame Jane Saint John Mildmay's Estate Act 1827	7 & 8 Geo. 4. c. 52 Pr.	21 June 1827
An Act to authorize the granting of Building Leases of the Settled Estate of Dame Jane St. John Mildmay, in the parish of St. Mary Islington in the county of Middlesex, and for other purposes.
George Tayler's Estate Act 1827	7 & 8 Geo. 4. c. 53 Pr.	21 June 1827
An Act for vesting certain Estates devised and settled by the Will of George Tayler deceased, in Trustees, to complete the Sale thereof to Simon Tayler gentleman, and for laying out the Purchase Money in the Purchase of other Estates, to be settled to the same Uses.
Bishop of London's Estate Act 1827	7 & 8 Geo. 4. c. 54 Pr.	21 June 1827
An Act for enabling the Bishop of London and his Successors to grant Licences to demise the Copyholds within the manor of Fulham in the county of Middlesex, for building upon and improving the same.
Bainbrigge's Estate Act 1827	7 & 8 Geo. 4. c. 55 Pr.	21 June 1827
An Act for confirming a Partition made by Mary Bainbrigge Spinster, with the Reverend Richard Fawcett Clerk and Anna Maria his Wife, and others, of an Estate situate in the Township of Headingley-cum-Burley in the Parish of Leeds in the County of York.
John Craven's and Frederick Bowman's Estates Act 1827	7 & 8 Geo. 4. c. 56 Pr.	21 June 1827
An Act for vesting certain Estates in the parishes of St. Mary Matfellon otherwise Whitechapel, and St. Botolph Aldgate, in the county of Middlesex, belonging to John Craven esquire, a Lunatic, and Frederick Bowman esquire, late Co-partners in Trade, and also certain other Estates in the parish of St. Mary Matfellon otherwise Whitechapel aforesaid, belonging exclusively to the said John Craven, in Trustees, for the purpose of effecting a Partition; and also for the purpose of effecting Sales, granting Building Leases, and making Improvements.
Bishop of Carlisle's Estate Act 1827	7 & 8 Geo. 4. c. 57 Pr.	21 June 1827
An Act to enable the Lord Bishop of Carlisle to grant a Lease, with Powers of Renewal, of Hereditaments in the parish of Lambeth in the county of Surrey, and to authorize the granting of Sub-leases for building thereon and for other purposes.
Hospital of Saint Mary Magdalene, Newcastle-upon-Tyne Act 1827	7 & 8 Geo. 4. c. 58 Pr.	21 June 1827
An Act for enabling the Master and Brethren of the Hospital of Saint Mary Magdelene, within the Town and County of Newcastle-upon-Tyne, to erect a Chapel on Part of their Possessions in the said Town, and for regulating the Performance of Divine Service therein; and also for carrying into Effect an Exchange between the said Master and Brethren and Ralph Naters Esquire; and also for enabling the said Master and Brethren to grant Building, Repairing, and other Leases of their Estates.
Samuel Pullin's and James Rhodes's Estates Act 1827	7 & 8 Geo. 4. c. 59 Pr.	21 June 1827
An Act for confirming certain Articles of Agreement between Samuel Pullin Esquire and James Rhodes Esquire, and for authorizing the granting of Building Leases of Freehold and Copyhold Ground in the Parish of Saint Mary Islington, pursuant to the said Articles, and for other Purposes.
Kent Life Assurance and Annuity Institution or Company (Amendment) Act 1827	7 & 8 Geo. 4. c. 60 Pr.	21 June 1827
An Act to alter and amend an Act passed in the Fifth Year of His present Majesty, (Note: Kent Life Assurance and Annuity Institution or Company Act 1824 (5 Geo. 4. c. 40 Pr.)) for dissolving a certain Partnership called 'The Kent Life Assurance and Annuity Institution or Company,' and for satisfying the Engagements entered into on behalf of the same Institution, und dividing the Surplus of the Capital belonging to the same Institution amongst the Holders of Shares of the same Capital.
William Hickey's Charity Estates Act 1827	7 & 8 Geo. 4. c. 61 Pr.	23 June 1827
An Act to amend and enlarge the Powers of an Act of the Fifty seventh Year of His late Majesty King George the Third, (Note: William Hickey's Charity Estates Act 1817 (57 Geo. 3. c. 16 Pr.)) for enabling the Trustees of the Charity Estates of William Hickey deceased, situate at Richmond in the County of Surrey, to grant Building and Repairing Leases Thereof.
Jameson's Divorce Act 1827 (Note: This act was not printed by the King's Printer.)	7 & 8 Geo. 4. c. 62 Pr.	12 April 1827
An Act to dissolve the Marriage of Andrew Jameson Esquire with Catherine his Wife, and to enable him to marry again; and for other Purposes therein mentioned.
Dufton Inclosure Act 1827	7 & 8 Geo. 4. c. 63 Pr.	28 May 1827
An Act for inclosing Lands within the Manor and Parish of Dufton in the County of Westmorland.
Exhall Inclosure Act 1827	7 & 8 Geo. 4. c. 64 Pr.	28 May 1827
An Act for inclosing Lands in the Parish of Exhall in the County of the City of Coventry.
Barron Grahame's Divorce Act 1827	7 & 8 Geo. 4. c. 65 Pr.	14 June 1827
An Act to dissolve the Marriage of Barron Grahame with Caroline Keissling his Wife, and to enable him to marry again; and for other Purposes therein mentioned.
Turner's Nullity of Marriage Act 1827	7 & 8 Geo. 4. c. 66 Pr.	14 June 1827
An Act to declare void an alleged Marriage between Ellen Turner, an Infant, and Edward Gibbon Wakefield.
Meyer's Naturalization Act 1827	7 & 8 Geo. 4. c. 67 Pr.	14 June 1827
An Act for naturalizing Morns Sigismund Meyer.
Wolff's Naturalization Act 1827	7 & 8 Geo. 4. c. 68 Pr.	14 June 1827
An Act for naturalizing the Reverend Joseph Wolff.
Woolsey's Naturalization Act 1827	7 & 8 Geo. 4. c. 69 Pr.	14 June 1827
An Act for naturalizing George Muirson Woolsey.
Peckham Inclosure Act 1827	7 & 8 Geo. 4. c. 70 Pr.	21 June 1827
An Act for inclosing, allotting, dividing, and laving in severalty the Common Fields and Common Meadows of Peckham in the County of Surrey.
Stansbury's Naturalization Act 1827	7 & 8 Geo. 4. c. 71 Pr.	21 June 1827
An Act for naturalizing Joseph Stansbury.
Melly's Naturalization Act 1827	7 & 8 Geo. 4. c. 72 Pr.	21 June 1827
An Act far naturalizing Andrew Melly.

=== Sources ===
- Simons, N., ed. (1829). "7° & 8° Georgii IV". The Statutes of the United Kingdom of Great Britain and Ireland. Vol. The Eleventh. From A.D. 1827, 7 & 8 George IV to A.D. 1829, 10 George IV. London: Eyre and Strahan. pp. 1–318 – via Internet Archive.
- Simons, N., ed. (1829). "7° & 8° Georgii IV". The Statutes of the United Kingdom of Great Britain and Ireland. Vol. The Eleventh. From A.D. 1827, 7 & 8 George IV to A.D. 1829, 10 George IV. London: Eyre and Strahan. pp. 1–318 – via Google Books.
- The Statutes of the United Kingdom of Great Britain and Ireland, 7 & 8 George IV. 1827. London. 1827 – via Internet Archive.
- The Statutes of the United Kingdom of Great Britain and Ireland, 7 & 8 George IV. 1827. London. 1827 – via Internet Archive.
- Journals of the House of Commons. Vol. 82. London: His Majesty's Stationery Office. pp. 7–610 – via Google Books.

== See also ==
- List of acts of the Parliament of the United Kingdom
