= Banking Act 1979 =

Act of the Parliament of the United Kingdom

Banking Act 1979 (Note: Section 52(1).)
- Act of Parliament
- Parliament of the United Kingdom
- Long title: An Act to regulate the acceptance of deposits in the course of a business; to confer functions on the Bank of England with respect to the control of institutions carrying on deposit-taking businesses; to give further protection to persons who are depositors with such institutions; to make provision with respect to advertisements inviting the making of deposits; to restrict the use of names and descriptions associated with banks and banking; to prohibit fraudulent inducement to make a deposit; to amend the Consumer Credit Act 1974 and the law with respect to instruments to which section 4 of the Cheques Act 1957 applies; to repeal certain enactments relating to banks and banking; and for purposes connected therewith.
- Citation: 1979 c. 37
- Introduced by: Nigel Lawson (Commons)
- Territorial extent: United Kingdom (Note: Section 52(2).)

Dates
- Royal assent: 4 April 1979
- Commencement: 1 October 1979 (Note: Section 52(4). The Banking Act 1979 (Commencement No. 1) Order 1979 (SI 1979/938).)
- Repealed: 15 July 1987
Other legislation
Amends	Bank Charter Act 1844; Inland Revenue Act 1880
Repeals/revokes	Protection of Depositors Act 1963; Protection of Depositors Act (Northern Ireland) 1964
Amended by	Statute Law (Repeals) Act 1981; Bankruptcy (Scotland) Act 1985; Housing (Consequential Provisions) Act 1985; Credit Unions (Northern Ireland) Order 1985; Building Societies Act 1986; Financial Services Act 1986; Banking Act 1987; Statute Law (Repeals) Act 2004
Repealed by	Banking Act 1987 s108(2)

Status: Partially repealed

Text of statute as originally enacted

Revised text of statute as amended

Text of the Banking Act 1979 as in force today (including any amendments) within the United Kingdom, from legislation.gov.uk.

The Banking Act 1979 (c. 37) is an act of the Parliament of the United Kingdom that was enacted in the wake of the secondary banking crisis of 1973–1975 to extend the Bank of England's regulatory powers over lenders (banks) and to provide protections for their depositors.

== Subsequent developments ==
The act was substantially repealed by the Banking Act 1987.

== See also ==
- UK banking law
- UK public service law
