= Inland Revenue Act 1880 =

Act of the Parliament of the United Kingdom

Inland Revenue Act 1880 (Note: Section 1.)
- Act of Parliament
- Parliament of the United Kingdom
- Long title: An Act to repeal the duties on Malt, to grant and alter certain duties of Inland Revenue, and to amend the Laws in relation to certain other duties.
- Citation: 43 & 44 Vict. c. 20
- Territorial extent: United Kingdom

Dates
- Royal assent: 12 August 1880
- Commencement: 12 August 1880 (Note: The Acts of Parliament (Commencement) Act 1793.)
- Repealed: 5 November 1993
Other legislation
Amends	See § Repealed enactments
Repeals/revokes	See § Repealed enactments
Amended by	Statute Law Revision Act 1894; Licensing (Scotland) Act 1903; Statute Law Revision Act 1950; Customs and Excise Act 1952; Statute Law Revision Act 1963; Banking Act 1979; Billiards (Abolition of Restrictions) Act 1987
Repealed by	Statute Law (Repeals) Act 1993

Status: Repealed

Text of statute as originally enacted

The Inland Revenue Act 1880 (43 & 44 Vict. c. 20) was an act of the Parliament of the United Kingdom that repealed the duties on malt, granted and altered certain duties of inland revenue, and amended the laws in relation to certain other duties.

== Provisions ==
=== Repealed enactments ===
Section 49 of the act repealed 33 enactments, listed in the second schedule to the act.

Citation		Description	Extent of repeal
1 Geo. 1. Stat. 2. c. 2	Malt Duties, etc. Act 1714	An Act for charging and continuing the duties on malt, &c.	The whole act.
33 Geo. 2. c. 7	Malt Duties, etc. Act 1759	An Act for granting to His Majesty several duties upon malt, and for raising the sum of eight millions by way of annuities and a lottery to be charged on the said duties, &c.	The whole act.
56 Geo. 3. c. 58	Beer Act 1816	An Act to repeal an Act made in the fifty-first year of His present Majesty for allowing the manufacture and use of a liquor prepared from sugar for colouring porter.	Sections two and three so far as they relate to brewers.
1 & 2 Geo. 4. c. 22	Beer Duties Act 1821	An Act for altering and amending the laws of excise for securing the payment of the duties on beer and ale brewed in Great Britain.	The whole act.
3 Geo. 4. c. 30	Duty on Beer or Bigg Malt Act 1822	An Act for reducing, during the continuance of the present duty on malt, the duty on malt made from bear or bigg only in Scotland.	The whole act.
6 Geo. 4. c. 58	Duties on Beer, Malt, etc. Act 1825	An Act for providing equivalent rates of excise duties, allowances, and drawbacks on beer and malt, &c.	The whole act.
6 Geo. 4. c. 81	Excise Licences Act 1825	An Act to repeal several duties payable on excise licences in Great Britain and Ireland, and to impose other duties in lieu thereof; and to amend the laws for granting excise licences.	Sections two and twenty-six, so far as they relate to brewers and maltsters or makers of malt.
7 & 8 Geo. 4. c. 52	Excise on Malt Act 1827	An Act to consolidate and amend certain laws relating to the revenue of excise on malt, &c.	The whole act.
11 Geo. 4 & 1 Will. 4. c. 17	Excise Laws Relating to Malt Act 1830	An Act to alter and amend an Act of the seventh and eighth years of His present Majesty for consolidating and amending the laws of excise on malt, &c.	The whole act.
11 Geo. 4 & 1 Will. 4. c. 31	Malt Duty (Ireland) Act 1830	An Act for reducing the duty on malt made from bear or bigg only, in Ireland, to the same duty as is now payable thereon in Scotland.	The whole act.
11 Geo. 4 & 1 Will. 4. c. 51	Beer Licences Act 1830	An Act to repeal certain of the duties on cyder in the United Kingdom, and on beer and ale in Great Britain, and to make other provisions in relation thereto.	The whole act, except sections twenty-two, twenty-three, and twenty-four.
1 & 2 Will. 4. c. 55	Illicit Distillation (Ireland) Act 1831	An Act to consolidate and amend the laws for suppressing the illicit making of malt and distillation of spirits in Ireland.	Sections one to eight inclusive, and sections seventeen to twenty-one inclusive, twenty-six, twenty-seven, twenty-eight, thirty, thirty-eight, forty-eight, and fifty-one so far as they relate to malt or corn or grain making into malt.
7 Will. 4 & 1 Vict. c. 49	Malt Duties Act 1837	An Act to amend certain laws of excise relating to the duties on malt made in the United Kingdom.	The whole act.
5 & 6 Vict. c. 30	Roasted Malt for Colouring Beer Act 1842	An Act to provide regulations for preparing and using roasted malt in colouring beer.	The whole act.
10 & 11 Vict. c. 5	Sugar in Brewing Act 1847	An Act to allow the use of sugar in the brewing of beer.	The whole act.
17 & 18 Vict. c. 27	Excise Act 1854	An Act for granting certain additional rates and duties of excise.	The whole act.
17 & 18 Vict. c. 30	Sugar Duties Act 1854	An Act for granting certain duties of excise on sugar made in the United Kingdom.	The whole act.
18 & 19 Vict. c. 94	Excise Act 1855	An Act to impose increased rates of duty of excise on spirits distilled in the United Kingdom, to allow malt, sugar, and molasses to be used duty free in the distilling of spirits, &c.	The whole act.
19 & 20 Vict. c. 34	Excise Duties Act 1856	An Act to grant allowances of excise duty on malt in stock, to alter and regulate certain drawbacks and allowances in respect of malt duty, &c.	The whole act.
22 & 23 Vict. c. 18	Income Tax Act 1859	An Act for granting to Her Majesty additional rates of income tax, and to reduce the period of credit allowed for payment of the excise duty on malt.	Section seven.
23 & 24 Vict. c. 113	Excise Act 1860	An Act to grant duties of excise on chicory and on licences to dealers in sweets or made wines; also to reduce the excise duty on hops and the period of credit allowed for payment of the duty on malt, &c.	Section two, sections twenty-two to thirty-two inclusive, and section thirty-three so far as it relates to malt.
23 & 24 Vict. c. 114	Spirits Act 1860	An Act to reduce into one Act and to amend the excise regulations relating to the distilling, rectifying, and dealing in spirits.	Sections fifty-two, sixty-one, and sixty-two, and section sixty-three so far as it relates to malt.
24 & 25 Vict. c. 91	Revenue (No. 2) Act 1861	An Act to amend the laws relating to the Inland Revenue.	Section seven.
25 & 26 Vict. c. 22	Revenue Act 1862	An Act to continue certain duties of Customs and Inland Revenue for the service of Her Majesty, and to grant, alter, and repeal certain other duties.	Sections three to eleven inclusive, and Schedule B.
26 & 27 Vict. c. 3	Excise Duty on Malt Act 1863	An Act to extend the credit for payment of a portion of the excise duty on malt.	The whole act.
27 & 28 Vict. c. 9	Malt for Feeding Animals Act 1864	An Act to allow the making of malt duty free to be used in feeding animals.	The whole act.
27 & 28 Vict. c. 56	Revenue (No. 2) Act 1864	An Act for granting to Her Majesty certain stamp duties, and to amend the laws relating to the Inland Revenue.	Sections eight, ten, and eleven.
28 & 29 Vict. c. 66	Excise Duty on Malt Act 1865	An Act to allow the charging of the excise duty on malt according to the weight of the grain used.	The whole act.
29 & 30 Vict. c. 64	Inland Revenue Act 1866	An Act to amend the laws relating to the Inland Revenue.	Sections one to six inclusive.
30 & 31 Vict. c. 90	Revenue Act 1867	An Act to alter certain duties, and to amend the laws relating to the Inland Revenue.	Sections fifteen and sixteen.
33 & 34 Vict. c. 32	Customs and Inland Revenue Act 1870	An Act to grant certain duties of Customs and Inland Revenue, and to repeal and alter other duties of Customs and Inland Revenue.	Sections six, eight, and nine.
37 & 38 Vict. c. 16	Customs and Inland Revenue Act 1874	An Act to grant certain duties of Customs and Inland Revenue, to repeal and alter other duties, and to amend the laws relating to Customs and Inland Revenue.	Sections thirteen to eighteen inclusive.
38 & 39 Vict. c. 23	Customs and Inland Revenue Act 1875	An Act to grant certain duties of Customs and Inland Revenue, to alter other duties, and to amend the laws relating to Customs and Inland Revenue.	Section seven.

== Subsequent developments ==
Section 36 of the act was repealed by section 1(1) of, and the first schedule to, the Statute Law Revision Act 1950 (14 Geo. 6. c. 6), which came into force on 23 May 1950.

Sections 2 to 46 and 48 to 56 of the act were repealed by section 320(1) of, and part I of the twelfth schedule to, the Customs and Excise Act 1952 (15 & 16 Geo. 6 & 1 Eliz. 2 c. 44), which came into operation on 1 January 1953. Section 57 was repealed by section 51(2) of, and schedule 7 to, the Banking Act 1979. Section 47 was repealed by section 1 of the Billiards (Abolition of Restrictions) Act 1987.

The first 3 entries in schedule 3 to the act were repealed by section 1 of, and the schedule to, the Statute Law Revision Act 1963, which came into force on 31 July 1963.

The whole act was repealed by section 1(1) of, and group 1 of part IX of schedule 1 to, the Statute Law (Repeals) Act 1993, which came into force on 5 November 1993.
