= Excise on Malt Act 1827 =

Act of the Parliament of the United Kingdom

- Act of Parliament
- Parliament of the United Kingdom
- Long title: An Act to consolidate and amend certain Laws relating to the Revenue of Excise on Malt made in the United Kingdom; and for amending the Laws relating to Brewers in Ireland, and to the Allowance in respect of the Malt Duty on Spirits made in Scotland and Ireland from Malt only.
- Citation: 7 & 8 Geo. 4. c. 52
- Territorial extent: Great Britain (in part); Ireland (in part); (Note: Section 82.)

Dates
- Royal assent: 2 July 1827
- Commencement: 10 October 1827
- Repealed: 12 August 1880
Other legislation
Amended by	Excise Laws Relating to Malt Act 1830
Repealed by	Inland Revenue Act 1880

Status: Repealed

Text of statute as originally enacted

The Excise on Malt Act 1827 (7 & 8 Geo. 4. c. 52) was an act of the Parliament of the United Kingdom that consolidated enactments related to excise of malt made in the United Kingdom.

== Provisions ==
Section 80 of the act repealed "all Laws Powers Authorities Rules Regulations Restrictions Exceptions Provisions Clauses Matters and Things provided for or contained in any Act or Acts in force at or immediately before the Commencement of this Act relating to the Revenue of Excise on Malt made in any Part of the United Kingdom of Great Britain and Ireland or relating to Permits for the Removal of Malt or to any Matter or Thing expressly provided for by this Act which is or are repugnant to or inconsistent with the several Matters Clauses Provisions and Regulations of this Act or any of them".

== Subsequent developments ==
The whole act was repealed by section 49 of, and the second schedule to, the Inland Revenue Act 1880 (43 & 44 Vict. c. 20), which came into force on 12 August 1880.
