= Dundee Police and Improvement Consolidation Act 1882 =

Act of the Parliament of the United Kingdom

Dundee Police and Improvement Consolidation Act 1882 (Note: Section 1.)
- Act of Parliament
- Parliament of the United Kingdom
- Long title: An Act to amend and consolidate the Dundee Police and other Acts; to enable the Dundee Police Commissioners to create and issue debenture stock; and for other purposes.
- Citation: 45 & 46 Vict. c. 185
- Territorial extent: Scotland (Note: Section 5.)

Dates
- Royal assent: 10 August 1882
- Commencement: 10 August 1882 (Note: The Acts of Parliament (Commencement) Act 1793.)

Other legislation
- Amends: See § Repealed enactments
- Repeals/revokes: See § Repealed enactments

Status: Current legislation

Text of statute as originally enacted

Text of the Dundee Police and Improvement Consolidation Act 1882 as in force today (including any amendments) within the United Kingdom, from legislation.gov.uk.

The Dundee Police and Improvement Consolidation Act 1882 (45 & 46 Vict. c. 185) is an act of the Parliament of the United Kingdom that consolidated enactments relating to the policing, sanitation and civic improvement of the burgh of Dundee, and empowered the Dundee Police Commissioners to issue debenture stock.

The act recited that the burgh had, in 1851, adopted the Police of Towns (Scotland) Act 1850 (3 & 4 Will. 4. c. 77) (with the exception of its water-supply clauses), and that this adoption had subsequently been amended and extended by a series of general and local acts. It provided that these enactments (the "special acts") should, as regards the burgh, be repealed and their provisions consolidated, altered, extended and amended, and that various provisions of the General Police and Improvement (Scotland) Act 1862 (25 & 26 Vict. c. 101) should be incorporated with the new act.

== Provisions ==
=== Repealed enactments ===
Section 3 of the act repealed 8 acts, listed in that section.

Citation	Short title	Description	Extent of repeal
13 & 14 Vict. c. 33	Police of Towns (Scotland) Act 1850	An Act to make more effectual provision for regulating the police of towns and populous places in Scotland, and for paving, draining, cleansing, lighting and improving the same.	The act, as regards the burgh.
19 & 20 Vict. c. 103	Nuisances Removal (Scotland) Act 1856	An Act to make better provision for the removal of nuisances, regulation of lodging houses, and the health of towns in Scotland.	The act, as regards the burgh.
23 & 24 Vict. c. 96	Police of Towns (Scotland) Amendment Act 1860	The Police of Towns (Scotland) Amendment Act, 1860.	The act, as regards the burgh.
28 & 29 Vict. c. 60	Dundee Roads Act 1865	An Act to transfer the statute labour roads in the burgh of Dundee to the commissioners of police of the said burgh, and to provide for the management and maintenance of the said roads.	The whole act.
30 & 31 Vict. c. 79	General Police and Improvement (Scotland) Act 1862 Order Confirmation (Dundee) Act 1867	An Act to confirm certain Provisional Orders under the General Police and Improvement (Scotland) Act, 1862, relating to the burgh of Dundee.	The whole act.
25 & 26 Vict. c. 101	General Police and Improvement (Scotland) Act 1862	An Act to make more effectual provision for regulating the police of towns and populous places in Scotland, and for lighting, cleansing, paving, draining, supplying water to and improving the same, and also for promoting the public health thereof.	The clauses adopted by the burgh, as regards the burgh.
34 & 35 Vict. c. 153	Dundee Police and Improvement Act 1871	An Act for the improvement of the burgh of Dundee and the police thereof; and for constructing new, and widening, altering, improving and diverting existing streets in said burgh; and for constructing sewers and other works, and for other purposes.	The act, except sections eight and nine, Branch XII, and the schedules annexed thereto.
41 & 42 Vict. c. 94	Dundee Street Tramways, Turnpike Roads and Police Act 1878	An Act to authorise the construction of tramways in the burgh of Dundee, and for the transference of the turnpike roads within the burgh to the Police Commissioners, and the abolition of tolls, and for other purposes.	Branches III, IV and V, and section four.
