= Invergordon Town Hall =

Municipal building in Invergordon, Scotland

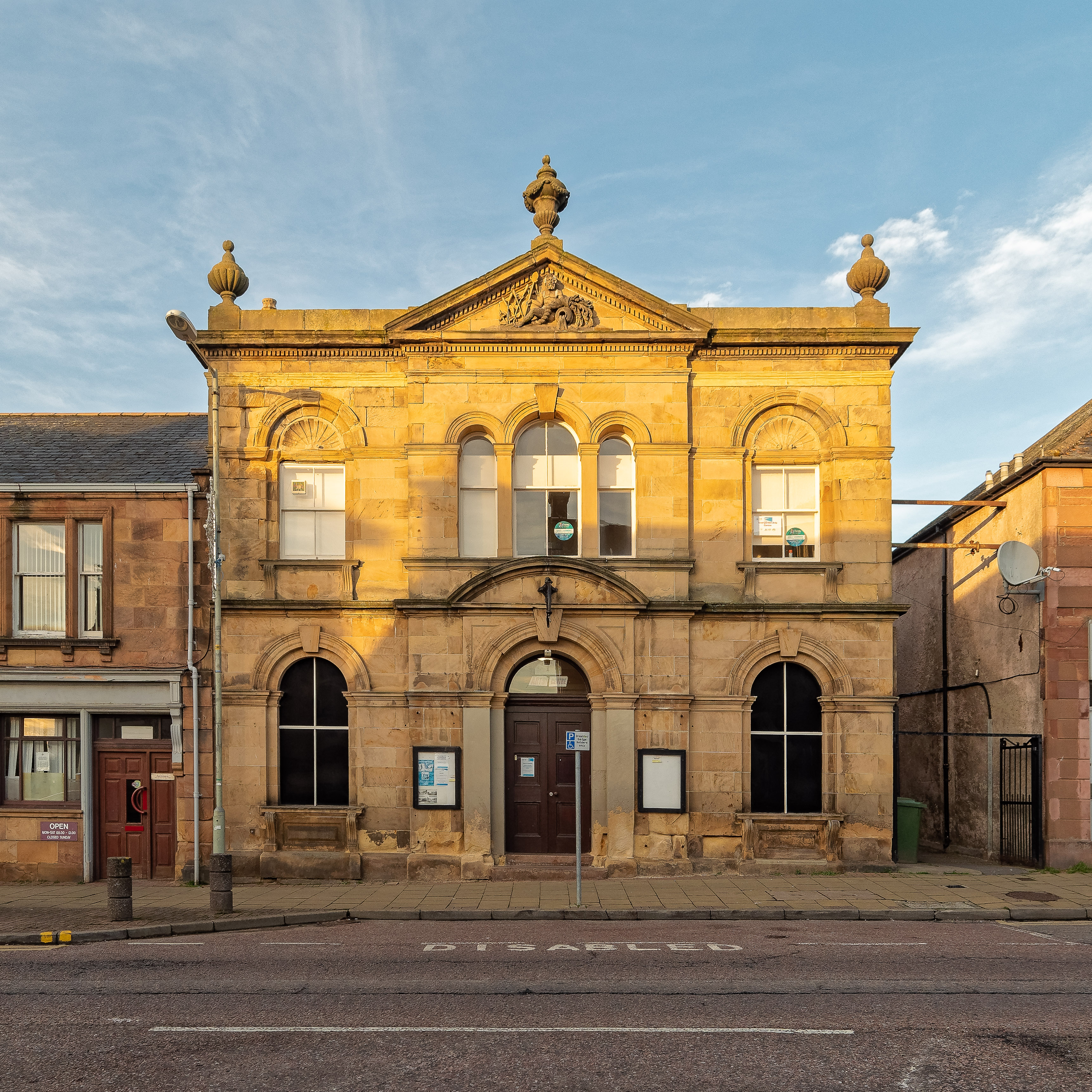
- Invergordon Town Hall

- Shown in Highland
- 57.6885°N 4.1698°W
- Location: High Street, Invergordon

History
- Built: 1871

Site notes
- Architect: William Cumming Joass
- Architectural style: Italianate style

Listed Building – Category B
- Official name: High Street, former Town Hall and Playhouse Cinema
- Designated: 21 August 1983
- Reference no.: LB35077

Invergordon Town Hall is a municipal building in the High Street in Invergordon in the Highland area of Scotland. The structure, which is used as a community events venue, is a Category B listed building.

== History ==
Following significant population growth, largely associated with development of the harbour, the area became a police burgh in 1863. In this context, the new council established its burgh chambers on the south side of the High Street at No. 56 and met there for the first time on 24 August 1864. Within a few years, council leaders decided that they also needed a community events venue; the site they selected for the new town hall was on the north side of the High Street. The new town hall was designed by William Cumming Joass in the Italianate style, built in ashlar stone and was completed in 1871.

The design involved a symmetrical main frontage with three bays facing onto the High Street. The central bay, which was slightly projected forward, featured a round headed doorway with a fanlight, an architrave and a keystone flanked by pilasters supporting a segmental pediment; on the first floor, there was a prominent Venetian window which was surmounted by modillioned pediment with a carving depicting Neptune in the tympanum. The outer bays were fenestrated by round headed windows with architraves and keystones on the ground floor and by shell headed windows with architraves on the first floor. At roof level, there a modillioned cornice, a small parapet and three urns. The carving depicting Neptune was sculpted by D. and A. Davidson. Internally, the principal room was the main assembly hall.

The town hall was initially used for concerts and theatre performances but, in 1934, it was leased to the Invergordon Picture House Company and a programme of conversion works were carried out, to a design by Alexander Ross & Son, so that it could be used as a cinema. It was also used as a Bingo Hall from the late 1960s. In the late 1960s, it was also the venue for a packed public meeting at which the managing director of British Aluminium, Ronald Utiger, talked about the potential local impact of a proposed aluminium smelter. Following local government re-organisation in 1975, it passed into the ownership of Ross and Cromarty District Council; it closed as a cinema in 1984 and was converted for use as an arts centre in 1988. Following the creation of unitary authorities in 1996, it passed into the ownership of the Highland Council. In January 2019, the council announced that, in the context of the significant cost of future refurbishment work which it estimated would be at least £200,000, it would consult on the possible disposal of the building. The building was generating limited income from its use as a community events venue but it was inadequate to cover operating costs. Accordingly, although a community group was formed to consider options, the group was unable to develop a viable proposal and, in June 2021, council officers recommended disposal of the building.

== See also ==
- List of listed buildings in Invergordon, Highland
