= List of listed buildings in Invergordon, Highland =

This is a list of listed buildings in the parish of Invergordon in Highland, Scotland.

== List ==
Name	Location	Date Listed	Grid Ref. (Note: Sometimes known as OSGB36, the grid reference (where provided) is based on the British national grid reference system used by the Ordnance Survey. • "Guide to National Grid". Ordnance Survey. • "Get-a-map". Ordnance Survey.)	Geo-coordinates	Notes	LB Number (Note: Historic Environment Scotland assign a unique alphanumeric identifier to each designated site in Scotland, for listed buildings this always begins with "LB", for example "LB12345".)	Image
High Street Anchor Bar				57°41′18″N 4°10′13″W	Category B	35076	Upload Photo
High Street, Former Town Hall And Playhouse Cinema				57°41′19″N 4°10′12″W	Category B	35077	Upload another image
High Street, Burgh Chambers				57°41′17″N 4°10′14″W	Category C(S)	35081	Upload Photo
Invergordon Parish Church (Church Of Scotland) and Church Hall, Castle Road				57°41′24″N 4°10′11″W	Category B	35072	Upload another image See more images
89-91, High Street "Drumbuie"				57°41′19″N 4°10′06″W	Category B	35078	Upload Photo
153, High Street				57°41′20″N 4°09′51″W	Category C(S)	35079	Upload Photo
86, High Street				57°41′18″N 4°10′05″W	Category B	35083	Upload Photo
60, High Street Royal Bank Of Scotland				57°41′17″N 4°10′13″W	Category B	35080	Upload Photo
84, High Street Commercial Bar				57°41′18″N 4°10′06″W	Category B	35082	Upload Photo
13 High Street, Allewyn				57°41′18″N 4°10′25″W	Category B	35074	Upload Photo
15-17 High Street				57°41′18″N 4°10′24″W	Category B	35075	Upload Photo
Firth View, 55 Shore Road				57°41′14″N 4°10′04″W	Category B	35084	Upload another image
64 Clyde Street				57°41′16″N 4°10′07″W	Category C(S)	35073	Upload Photo
Shore Road, Former Grain Store, Mechanical Spare Parts Warehouse And Service Depot				57°41′17″N 4°09′58″W	Category B	35085	Upload Photo

== Key ==
The scheme for classifying buildings in Scotland is:

- Category A: "buildings of national or international importance, either architectural or historic; or fine, little-altered examples of some particular period, style or building type."
- Category B: "buildings of regional or more than local importance; or major examples of some particular period, style or building type, which may have been altered."
- Category C: "buildings of local importance; lesser examples of any period, style, or building type, as originally constructed or moderately altered; and simple traditional buildings which group well with other listed buildings."

In March 2016 there were 47,288 listed buildings in Scotland. Of these, 8% were Category A, and 50% were Category B, with the remaining 42% being Category C.

== See also ==
- List of listed buildings in Highland
