= Cheryl Paul =

Scottish broadcast journalist

Cheryl Paul is a Scottish broadcast journalist, currently working with STV News.

Born in Staffordshire, she moved to Invergordon in the Scottish Highlands aged 9 where her parents ran a hotel. After attending Invergordon Academy she joined the family business. Aged 19, she married Nick, an offshore oil IT specialist, moved to Aberdeen and worked as a secretary for oil-related companies. After joining BBC Radio Aberdeen (an opt-out of BBC Radio Scotland) as a newsroom assistant, she became a reporter and read the travel and weather.

After Radio Aberdeen and a stint on Aberdeen Journals Ltd. and later, Aberdeen Independent, in 1997, she joined Grampian Television (now STV North) as a reporter. Currently, Paul is the station's business correspondent, working mainly for the Northern Scotland edition of the nightly regional news programme, STV News at Six.

From time to time, she has also co-presented the main edition of the programme.
