= Invergordon =

Town in Scotland

Coordinates: 57.68792°N 4.15704°W

Invergordon: Scottish Gaelic: Inbhir Ghòrdain / An Rubha
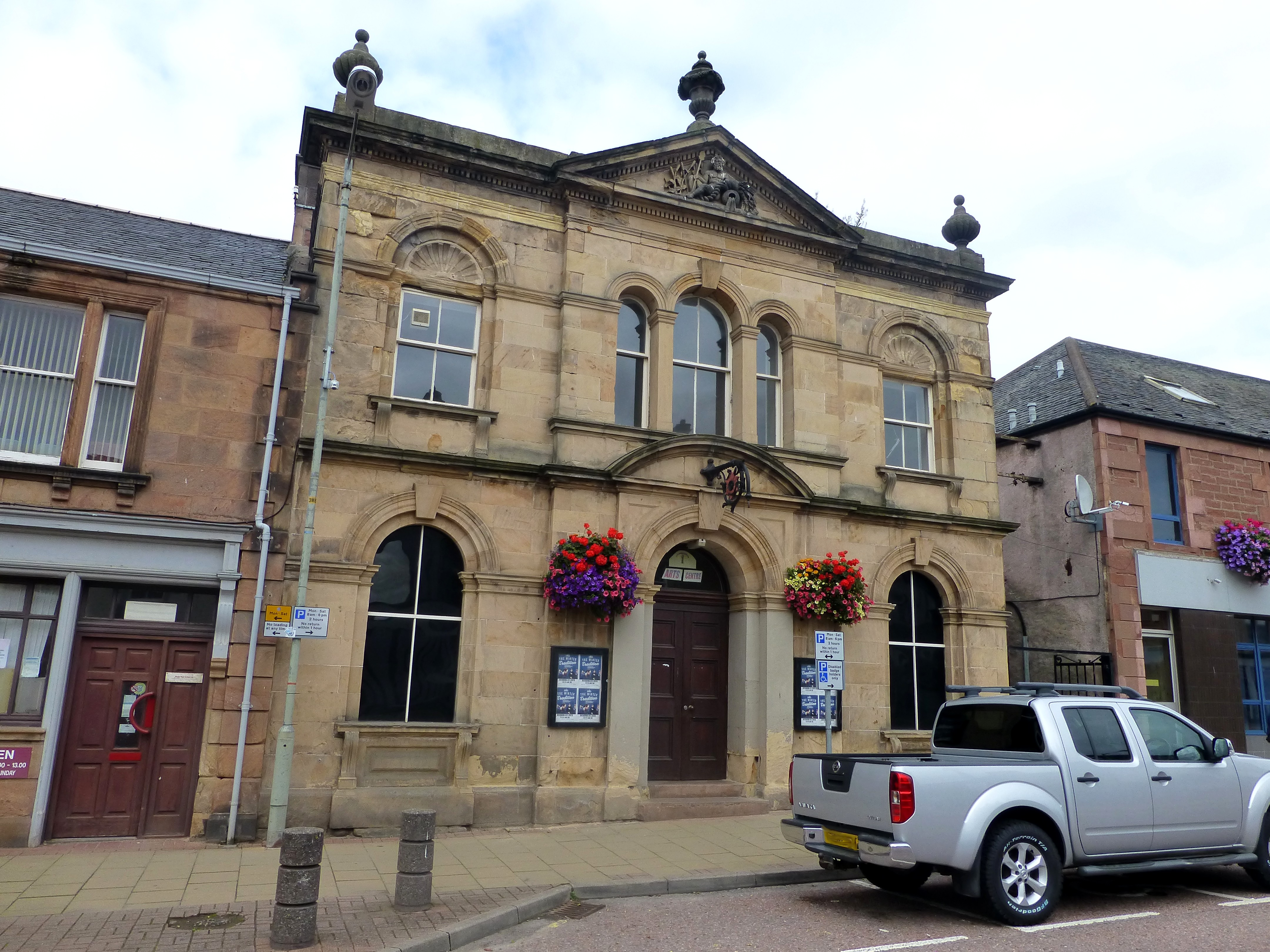
- Invergordon Town Hall

- Location within the Ross and Cromarty area
- Population: 3,799 (2022)
- OS grid reference: NH715685
  - Edinburgh: 125 mi (201 km)
  - London: 456 mi (734 km)
- Council area: Highland
- Lieutenancy area: Ross and Cromarty
- Country: Scotland
- Sovereign state: United Kingdom
- Post town: INVERGORDON
- Postcode district: IV18
- Dialling code: 01349
- Police: Scotland
- Fire: Scottish
- Ambulance: Scottish
- UK Parliament: Caithness, Sutherland and Easter Ross
- Scottish Parliament: Caithness, Sutherland and Ross

Invergordon (/ˌɪnvərˈɡɔːrdən/; Scottish Gaelic: Inbhir Ghòrdain or An Rubha) is a historic port town in Easter Ross, in Ross and Cromarty, Highland, Scotland. It lies in the parish of Rosskeen, and is approximately 125 miles (201 km) north-northeast of Edinburgh, 126 miles (203 km) north of Glasgow, and 15 miles (24 km) north of Inverness. It had a population of 3,799 in 2022.

== History ==
The town built up around the harbour which was established in 1828. The area became a police burgh in 1863 and Invergordon Town Hall was completed in 1871.

The Invergordon Grain Distillery, operated by Philippines-owned whisky giant Whyte & Mackay, was established in 1959. Connected to the distillery was the Invergordon Distillery Pipe Band which was formed in 1964.

In 1971, the British Aluminium Company, which was 47% owned by Reynolds Metals, opened an aluminium smelter at Invergordon.

== Naval base ==
The naval institute was designed in 1914 by Edinburgh architect Stewart Kaye in anticipation of the First World War. The naval base was the venue for the Invergordon Mutiny of 1931. Remains of the naval base are evidenced in the tank farm lying behind the town centre; the port used to contain fuel oil and water supplies for naval ships (see Inchindown oil tanks).

One German bomb hit one of the tanks during the Second World War when a large flying boat base occupied much of the northerly coast of the Cromarty Firth. The naval base closed in 1956 (though the Oil Fuel Depot was retained in service until 1991). On 27–28 May 1957 the Royal Navy held a fleet review in the waters off the town.

Since 1978, the former naval base has been used as a deep water port which has been visited by many large cruise liners and allows disembarkation for coach tours in the northern Highlands. In the summer of 2017, the port was visited by the new aircraft carrier HMS Queen Elizabeth during her sea trials. On 19 June 2021 the last of the Batch-2 River-class offshore patrol vessels, HMS Spey, was commissioned at a ceremony at the former naval base. The Royal Marines Band Service was at the ceremony providing musical support.

== Culture ==
Invergordon has a number of painted murals. There is a mural trail, designed to integrate local community groups, opened by Anne, Princess Royal in 2007.

== Infrastructure ==
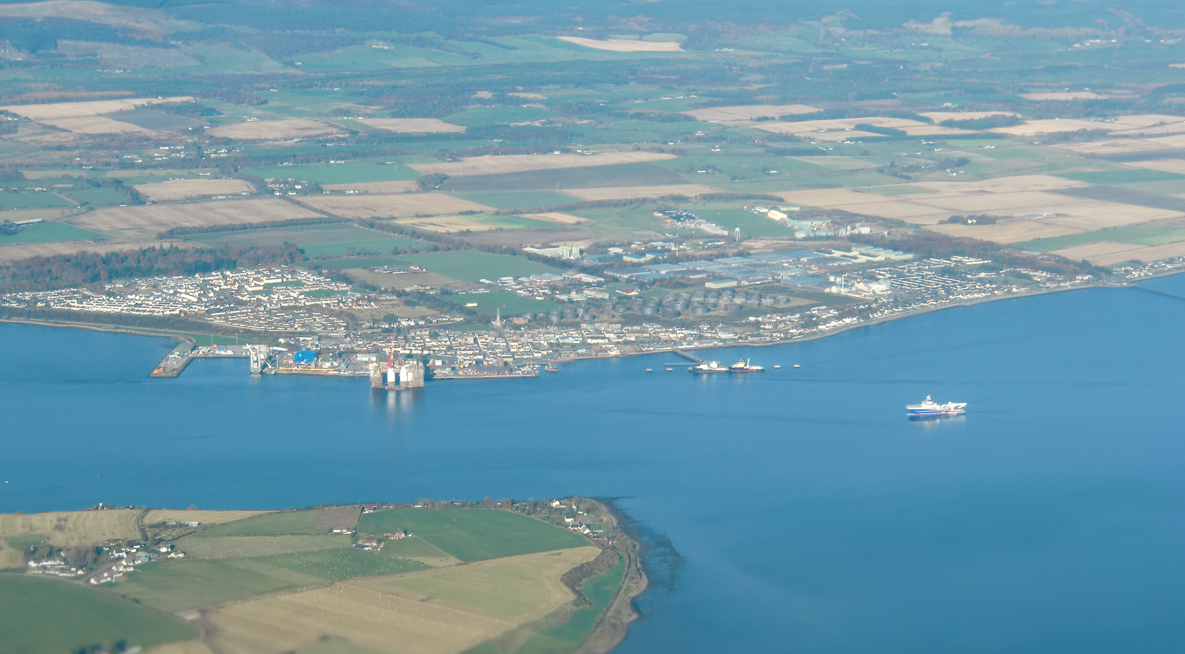
Aerial photo of Invergordon

The town is served by Invergordon railway station which lies on the Far North Line, and is in close proximity to the A9 trunk road.

As of 2012, there is a controversial scheme for a waste incinerator at the Cromarty Firth Industrial Park in Invergordon, which the Scottish government are now reviewing following protests by the local community. The £43 million plant would be built by Combined Power and Heat (Highlands) Ltd.

== Education ==
Invergordon has one secondary school, Invergordon Academy, which is fed by four primary schools, Newmore Primary School, Park Primary School, South Lodge Primary School and Milton Primary School.

In 2013 the Highland Council announced plans for a new "super school" to serve Ross-shire with the preferred option being that it be built in Invergordon. This has seen much protest by locals and is currently under review. If it went ahead Alness and Tain academies would close and there would also be a change to the local primary schools.

== In popular culture ==
In Season 3 of Amazon Prime motoring series The Grand Tour, Jeremy Clarkson, James May and Richard Hammond visited Invergordon as part of their journey along the NC500.

== Notable residents ==
- Jimmy Andrews (1927–2012), footballer
- Robert Brough (1872–1905), painter
- John D. Burgess (1934–2005), award winning bagpipe player
- Allan Cameron (1917–2011), curler
- Bryan Gunn (born 1963), footballer
- James MacBain (1828–1892), Australian politician
- William Mackenzie(1870–1942), Scottish poet
- Rob MacLean (born 1958), football commentator
- Admiral of the Fleet Sir John Julian Robertson Oswald
- Cheryl Paul, newsreader
- Sir Charles Ross (1872–1942), inventor of the Ross Rifle
- William Ramsay Smith (1859–1937), doctor and activist for Indigenous Australian rights
- David Sutherland (1933–2023), comic book artist and illustrator best known for illustrating comic strips in The Beano such as The Bash Street Kids and Dennis the Menace and Gnasher.
- Luke Stoltman (born 1984), five-time winner of Scotland's Strongest Man, 2021 Europe's Strongest Man, 2024 Europe's Strongest Man and 2025 Britain's Strongest Man
- Tom Stoltman (born 1994), brother of Luke Stoltman, World's strongest man winner 2021, 2022 and 2024
