= W. A. MacKenzie =

Scottish poet, artist and journalist

William Andrew Mackenzie (1870—1942) was a Scottish poet, editor, artist and journalist, born in Invergordon, Scotland and educated at Marischal College, Aberdeen, later moving to London.

During World War One, Mackenzie served in France, Belgium and Italy, rising from the rank of Private to Captain. He was awarded the Military Cross for his bravery in combat.

Other positions held included being the Secretary of the Royal Society of Arts and Secretary General of Save the Children International (1920—1939).

Mackenzie authored several detective novels featuring his recurring character Sir Nigel Lacaita ('The Bite Of The Leech', 'The Black Butterfly', 'The Drexel Dream'). His locked-room mystery novel Flower o' the Peach was republished in 2026 as part of Serling Lake's 'Impossible Crime Classics' series. He also wrote poems and contributed to Punch.

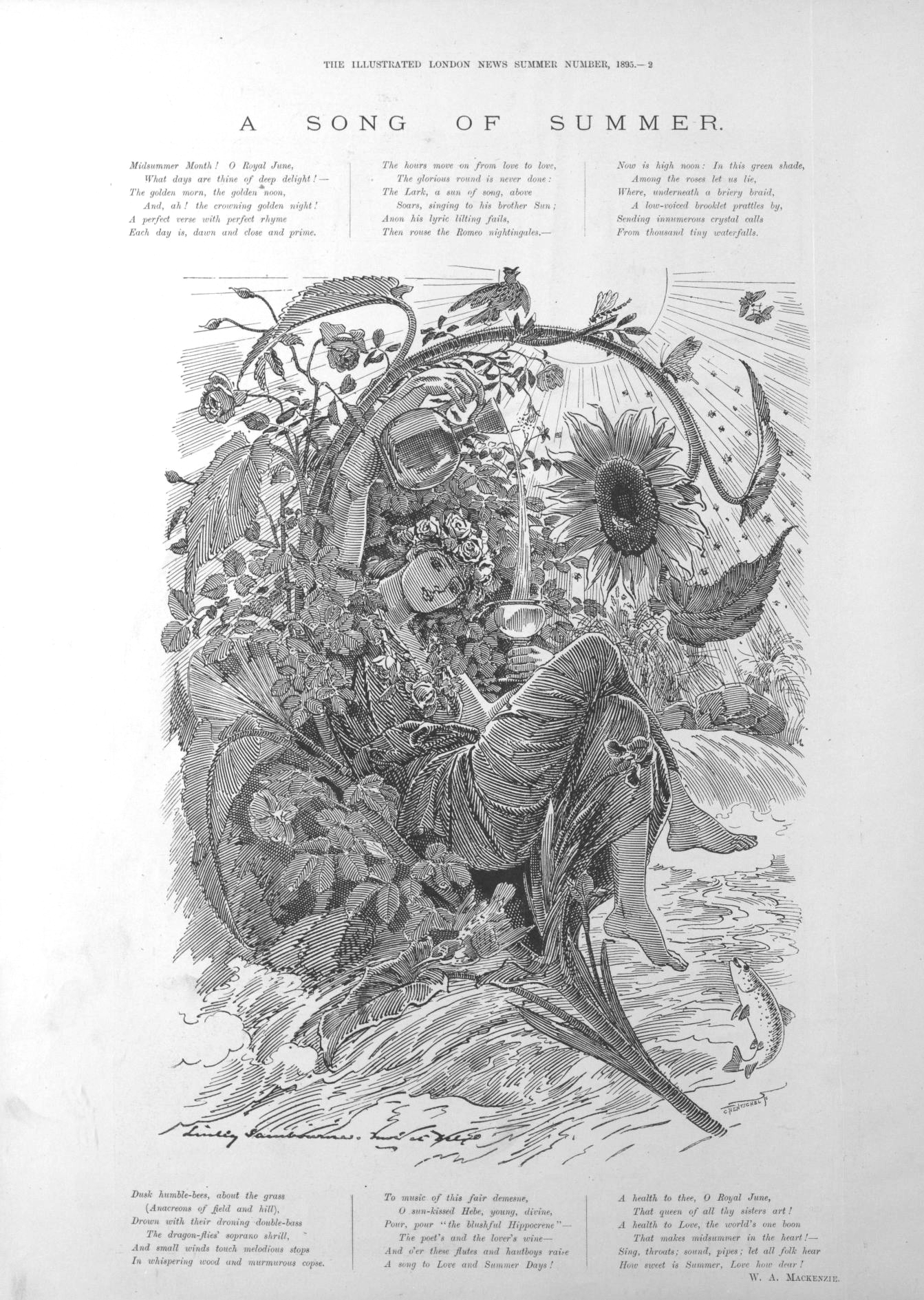
'A Song of Summer'
