= Town Councils (Scotland) Act 1900 =

Act of the Parliament of the United Kingdom

Town Councils (Scotland) Act 1900 (Note: Section 1.)
- Act of Parliament
- Parliament of the United Kingdom
- Long title: An Act to consolidate and amend the Law relating to the Election and Proceedings of Town Councils in Scotland.
- Citation: 63 & 64 Vict. c. 49
- Territorial extent: Scotland

Dates
- Royal assent: 8 August 1900
- Commencement: 1 January 1901 (Note: Section 2.)
- Repealed: 16 May 1975
Other legislation
Amends	See § Repealed enactments
Repeals/revokes	See § Repealed enactments
Amended by	Town Councils (Scotland) Act 1903; Local Government (Scotland) Act 1947; Gas Act 1948
Repealed by	Local Government (Scotland) Act 1973

Status: Repealed

Text of statute as originally enacted

The Town Councils (Scotland) Act 1900 (63 & 64 Vict. c. 49) was an act of the Parliament of the United Kingdom that consolidated enactments related to the election and proceedings of town councils in Scotland.

== Provisions ==
=== Repealed enactments ===
Section 3 of the act repealed 17 enactments, listed in the first schedule to the act.

Citation	Short title	Description	Extent of repeal
3 Geo. 4. c. 91	Royal Burghs (Scotland) Act 1822	An Act for regulating the mode of accounting for the common good and revenues of the Royal burghs of Scotland.	The whole act.
3 & 4 Will. 4. c. 76	Royal Burghs (Scotland) Act 1833	An Act to alter and amend the laws for the election of magistrates and councils of the Royal burghs in Scotland.	The whole act.
3 & 4 Will. 4. c. 77	Parliamentary Burghs (Scotland) Act 1833	An Act to provide for the appointment and election of magistrates and councillors for the several burghs and towns of Scotland which are now returning or contributing to return members to Parliament, and are not Royal burghs.	The whole act.
15 & 16 Vict. c. 32	Burghs (Scotland) Act 1852	An Act to alter and amend certain provisions in the laws relating to the number and election of magistrates and councillors in the burghs in Scotland.	The whole act.
19 & 20 Vict. c. 58	Burgh Voters Registration (Scotland) Act 1856	An Act to amend the law for the registration of persons entitled to vote in the election of members to serve in Parliament for burghs in Scotland.	Section 32.
23 & 24 Vict. c. 47	Burgesses (Scotland) Act 1860	An Act to amend the law relative to the legal qualifications of councillors, and the admission of burgesses in Royal burghs in Scotland.	The whole act.
24 & 25 Vict. c. 36	Boundaries of Burghs Extension (Scotland) Act 1861	An Act to amend the Boundaries of Burghs Extension (Scotland) Act.	The whole act.
31 & 32 Vict. c. 108	Municipal Elections Amendment (Scotland) Act 1868	The Municipal Elections Amendment (Scotland) Act, 1868	The whole act.
33 & 34 Vict. c. 92	Municipal Elections Amendment (Scotland) Act 1870	The Municipal Elections Amendment (Scotland) Act, 1870.	The whole act.
35 & 36 Vict. c. 33	Ballot Act 1872	The Ballot Act, 1872.	Subsection (2) of section twenty-two.
39 & 40 Vict. c. 12	Burgesses Qualification (Scotland) Act 1876	An Act to assimilate the law of Scotland to that of England respecting the creation of burgesses.	The whole act.
39 & 40 Vict. c. 25	Burgh Wards (Scotland) Act 1876	An Act to amend the law of Scotland in regard to the division of burghs into wards.	The whole act.
44 & 45 Vict. c. 13	Municipal Elections Amendment (Scotland) Act 1881	The Municipal Elections Amendment (Scotland) Act, 1881.	The whole act.
48 & 49 Vict. c. 9	Municipal Voters Relief Act 1885	The Municipal Voters Relief Act, 1885.	The whole act as regards Scotland.
55 & 56 Vict. c. 55	Burgh Police (Scotland) Act 1892	The Burgh Police (Scotland) Act, 1892.	Section eleven, from the words "and where not divided," to the word "rearrangement," and the words "and wards" wherever they occur; section thirteen, the words "or of the wards of a burgh"; section fourteen; section twenty-four; section twenty-six, the word "herein-after" where first occurring, and from the words "and he shall preside" to end of section; sections twenty-eight to forty-one inclusive; section forty-four, sections fifty to fifty-four inclusive; section fifty-five, subsection (2); sections sixty-one to seventy-two inclusive; Schedule IX., Schedule X.
57 & 58 Vict. c. 18	Burgh Police (Scotland) Act 1892, Amendment Act 1894	The Burgh Police (Scotland) Act 1892, Amendment Act, 1894.	The whole act.
57 & 58 Vict. c. 58	Local Government (Scotland) Act 1894	The Local Government (Scotland) Act, 1894.	The words "or municipal" and "municipal" where they occur in section eleven; subsection six of section thirteen; and in section fifteen, the words "and burgh commissioners for town council or town councillors."

== Subsequent developments ==
The whole act was repealed by section 237(1) of, and schedule 29 to, the Local Government (Scotland) Act 1973 (c. 65), which came into force on 16 May 1975.
