= List of acts of the Parliament of the United Kingdom from 1833 =

This is a complete list of acts of the Parliament of the United Kingdom for the year 1833.

The first parliament of the United Kingdom was held in 1801; parliaments between 1707 and 1800 were either parliaments of Great Britain or of Ireland). For acts passed up until 1707, see the list of acts of the Parliament of England and the list of acts of the Parliament of Scotland. For acts passed from 1707 to 1800, see the list of acts of the Parliament of Great Britain. See also the list of acts of the Parliament of Ireland.

For acts of the devolved parliaments and assemblies in the United Kingdom, see the list of acts of the Scottish Parliament, the list of acts of the Northern Ireland Assembly, and the list of acts and measures of Senedd Cymru; see also the list of acts of the Parliament of Northern Ireland.

The number shown after each act's title is its chapter number. Acts passed before 1963 are cited using this number, preceded by the year(s) of the reign during which the relevant parliamentary session was held; thus the Union with Ireland Act 1800 is cited as "39 & 40 Geo. 3 c. 67", meaning the 67th act passed during the session that started in the 39th year of the reign of George III and which finished in the 40th year of that reign. The modern convention is to use Arabic numerals in citations (thus "41 Geo. 3" rather than "41 Geo. III"). Acts of the last session of the Parliament of Great Britain and the first session of the Parliament of the United Kingdom are both cited as "41 Geo. 3". Acts passed from 1963 onwards are simply cited by calendar year and chapter number.

All modern acts have a short title, e.g. the Local Government Act 2003. Some earlier acts also have a short title given to them by later acts, such as by the Short Titles Act 1896.

== 3 & 4 Will. 4 ==
The first session of the 11th Parliament of the United Kingdom, which met from 29 January 1833 until 29 August 1833.

This session was also traditionally cited as 3 & 4 Gul. 4, 3 & 4 Wm. 4 or 3 & 4 W. 4.

=== Public general acts ===
Short title	Citation	Royal assent
Long title
Supply Act 1833 (repealed)	3 & 4 Will. 4. c. 1	29 March 1833
An Act to apply certain Sums to the Service of the Year One thousand eight hundred and thirty-three. (Repealed by Statute Law Revision Act 1874 (37 & 38 Vict. c. 35))
Exchequer Bills Act 1833 (repealed)	3 & 4 Will. 4. c. 2	29 March 1833
An Act for raising the Sum of Twelve Millions by Exchequer Bills, for the Service of the Year One thousand eight hundred and thirty-three. (Repealed by Statute Law Revision Act 1874 (37 & 38 Vict. c. 35))
Duties on Sugar, etc. Act 1833 (repealed)	3 & 4 Will. 4. c. 3	29 March 1833
An Act for continuing to His Majesty until the Fifth Day of April One thousand eight hundred and thirty-four certain Duties on Sugar imported into the United Kingdom, and for One Year certain Duties on Personal Estates, Offices, and Pensions in England, for the Service of the Year One thousand eight hundred and thirty-three. (Repealed by Statute Law Revision Act 1874 (37 & 38 Vict. c. 35))
Local Disturbances, etc. (Ireland) Act 1833 (repealed)	3 & 4 Will. 4. c. 4	2 April 1833
An Act for the more effectual Suppression of local Disturbances and dangerous Associations in Ireland. (Repealed by Statute Law Revision Act 1874 (37 & 38 Vict. c. 35))
Mutiny Act 1833 (repealed)	3 & 4 Will. 4. c. 5	20 April 1833
An Act for punishing Mutiny and Desertion; and for the better Payment of the Army and their Quarters. (Repealed by Statute Law Revision Act 1874 (37 & 38 Vict. c. 35))
Marine Mutiny Act 1833 (repealed)	3 & 4 Will. 4. c. 6	20 April 1833
An Act for the Regulation of His Majesty's Royal Marine Forces while on Shore. (Repealed by Statute Law Revision Act 1874 (37 & 38 Vict. c. 35))
Indemnity Act 1833 (repealed)	3 & 4 Will. 4. c. 7	6 May 1833
An Act to indemnify such Persons in the United Kingdom as have omitted to qualify themselves for Offices and Employments, and for extending the Time limited for those Purposes respectively until the Twenty-fifth Day of March One thousand eight hundred and thirty-four; to permit such Persons in Great Britain as have omitted to make and file Affidavits of the Execution of Indentures of Clerks to Attornies and Solicitors to make and file the same on or before the First Day of Hilary Term One thousand eight hundred and thirty-four, and to allow Persons to make and file such Affidavits, although the Persons whom they served shall have neglected to take out their Annual Certificates. (Repealed by Promissory Oaths Act 1871 (34 & 35 Vict. c. 48))
Quays, etc., Between the Tower and London Bridge Act 1833 (repealed)	3 & 4 Will. 4. c. 8	6 May 1833
An Act to amend an Act (Note: Quays, etc., Between Tower and London Bridge Act 1832 (2 & 3 Will. 4. c. 66)) for the Conveyance of certain Premises situate between London Bridge and the Tower of London. (Repealed by Statute Law (Repeals) Act 1993 (c. 50))
Seamen's Hospital Society Act 1833	3 & 4 Will. 4. c. 9	6 May 1833
An Act for incorporating the Members of a Society, commonly called "The Seaman's Hospital Society," and their Successors, as therein is mentioned and provided; and for the better enabling and empowering them to carry on the charitable and useful Designs of the same Society.
Customs Act 1833 (repealed)	3 & 4 Will. 4. c. 10	17 May 1833
An Act to reduce the Duty payable on Cotton Wool imported into the United Kingdom. (Repealed by Statute Law Revision Act 1861 (24 & 25 Vict. c. 101))
Excise Duties, etc., on Tiles Repeal Act 1833 (repealed)	3 & 4 Will. 4. c. 11	17 May 1833
An Act for repealing the Duties and Drawbacks of Excise on Tiles. (Repealed by Statute Law Revision Act 1874 (37 & 38 Vict. c. 35))
Duties on Personal Estates Repeal Act 1833 (repealed)	3 & 4 Will. 4. c. 12	17 May 1833
An Act to repeal the Duties on Personal Estates continued by an Act of the present Session of Parliament. (Note: Duties on Sugar, etc. Act 1833 (3 & 4 Will. 4. c. 3)) (Repealed by Statute Law Revision Act 1874 (37 & 38 Vict. c. 35))
Public Revenue (Scotland) Act 1833	3 & 4 Will. 4. c. 13	17 May 1833
An Act to provide for the Execution of the Duties performed by the Barons of Exchequer in Scotland in relation to the Public Revenue, and to place the Management of the Assessed Taxes and Land Tax in Scotland under the Commissioners for the Affairs of Taxes.
Savings Bank Act 1833 (repealed)	3 & 4 Will. 4. c. 14	10 June 1833
An Act to enable Depositors in Savings Banks, and others, to purchase Government Annuities through the Medium of Savings Banks; and to amend an Act of the Ninth Year of His late Majesty, (Note: Savings Bank Act 1828 (9 Geo. 4. c. 92)) to consolidate and amend the Laws relating to Savings Banks. (Repealed by Post Office Savings Bank Act 1954 (2 & 3 Eliz. 2. c. 62) and Trustee Savings Banks Act 1954 (2 & 3 Eliz. 2. c. 63))
Dramatic Copyright Act 1833 (repealed)	3 & 4 Will. 4. c. 15	10 June 1833
An Act to amend the Laws relating to Dramatic Literary Property. (Repealed by Copyright Act 1911 (1 & 2 Geo. 5. c. 46))
Duties on Soap Act 1833 (repealed)	3 & 4 Will. 4. c. 16	10 June 1833
An Act to repeal the Duties, Allowances, and Drawbacks of Excise on Soap, and to grant other Duties, Allowances, and Drawbacks, in lieu thereof. (Repealed by Statute Law Revision Act 1861 (24 & 25 Vict. c. 101))
Manufacturers of Stone Blue Act 1833 (repealed)	3 & 4 Will. 4. c. 17	10 June 1833
An Act for repealing Part of an Act of the Twenty-sixth Year of King George the Third, (Note: Duties on Starch Act 1786 (26 Geo. 3. c. 51)) for better securing the Duties on Starch, and for preventing Frauds on the said Duties; and for making other Provisions in lieu thereof. (Repealed by Statute Law Revision Act 1861 (24 & 25 Vict. c. 101))
Supply Act 1833 (repealed)	3 & 4 Will. 4. c. 18	18 June 1833
An Act to apply the Sum of Six Millions out of the Consolidated Fund to the Service of the Year One thousand eight hundred and thirty-three. (Repealed by Statute Law Revision Act 1874 (37 & 38 Vict. c. 35))
Police Magistrates, Metropolis Act 1833 (repealed)	3 & 4 Will. 4. c. 19	18 June 1833
An Act for the more effectual Administration of Justice in the Office of a Justice of the Peace in the several Police Offices established in the Metropolis, and for the more effectual Prevention of Depredations on the River Thames and its Vicinity, for Three Years. (Repealed by Metropolitan Police Courts Act 1839 (2 & 3 Vict. c. 71))
Stafford Election Act 1833 (repealed)	3 & 4 Will. 4. c. 20	18 June 1833
An Act to indemnify Witnesses who may give Evidence before either House of Parliament touching the Charge of Bribery in the Election of Burgesses to serve in Parliament for the Borough of Stafford. (Repealed by Statute Law Revision Act 1874 (37 & 38 Vict. c. 35))
Militia Ballots Suspension Act 1833 (repealed)	3 & 4 Will. 4. c. 21	28 June 1833
An Act to suspend until the End of the next Session of Parliament the making of Lists and the Ballots and Enrolments for the Militia of the United Kingdom. (Repealed by Statute Law Revision Act 1874 (37 & 38 Vict. c. 35))
Sewers Act 1833 (repealed)	3 & 4 Will. 4. c. 22	28 June 1833
An Act to amend the Laws relating to Sewers. (Repealed by Land Drainage Act 1930 (20 & 21 Geo. 5. c. 44))
Stamps Act 1833 (repealed)	3 & 4 Will. 4. c. 23	28 June 1833
An Act to reduce the Stamp Duties on Advertisements, and on certain Sea Insurances; to repeal the Stamp Duties on Pamphlets, and on Receipts for Sums under Five Pounds; and to exempt Insurances on Farming Stock from Stamp Duties. (Repealed by Inland Revenue Repeal Act 1870 (33 & 34 Vict. c. 99))
Government Annuities Act 1833 (repealed)	3 & 4 Will. 4. c. 24	9 July 1833
An Act to amend an Act of the Tenth Year of His late Majesty, (Note: National Debt Act 1829 (10 Geo. 4. c. 27)) for regulating the Reduction of the National Debt. (Repealed by Government Annuities Act 1929 (19 & 20 Geo. 5. c. 29))
Exchequer Bills (No. 2) Act 1833 (repealed)	3 & 4 Will. 4. c. 25	9 July 1833
An Act for raising the Sum of Fifteen millions seven hundred and fifty-two thousand six hundred and fifty Pounds by Exchequer Bills, for the Service of the Year One thousand eight hundred and thirty-three. (Repealed by Statute Law Revision Act 1874 (37 & 38 Vict. c. 35))
River Liffey, Dublin Act 1833 (repealed)	3 & 4 Will. 4. c. 26	28 June 1833
An Act to repeal so much of an Act passed in the Parliament of Ireland in the Thirty-fourth Year of His Majesty King George the Third (Note: River Anna Liffey Fire Prevention Act 1794 (34 Geo. 3. c. 8 (I))) as imposes Fines on the Masters of Vessels lying in the River Liffey for having Fires on board. (Repealed by Statute Law Revision Act 1874 (37 & 38 Vict. c. 35))
Real Property Limitation Act 1833 (repealed)	3 & 4 Will. 4. c. 27	24 July 1833
An Act for the Limitation of Actions and Suits relating to Real Property, and for simplifying the Remedies for trying the Rights thereto. (Repealed for England and Wales by Limitation Act 1939 (2 & 3 Geo. 6. c. 21) and for Northern Ireland by Statute Law Revision Act 1874 (37 & 38 Vict. c. 35), Real Property Limitation Act 1874 (37 & 38 Vict. c. 57), Civil Procedure Acts Repeal Act 1879 (42 & 43 Vict. c. 59), Statute Law Revision (No. 2) Act 1890 (53 & 54 Vict. c. 51), Statute Law Revision Act (Northern Ireland) 1954 (c. 35 (N.I.)), Administration of Estates Act (Northern Ireland) 1955 (c. 24 (N.I.)) and Statute of Limitations Act (Northern Ireland) 1958 (c. 10 (N.I.)))
Woollen Trade Act 1833 (repealed)	3 & 4 Will. 4. c. 28	24 July 1833
An Act to repeal an Act of the Thirteenth Year of His Majesty King George the First, (Note: Woollen Manufacture Act 1726 (13 Geo. 1. c. 23)) for the better Regulation of the Woollen Trade. (Repealed by Statute Law Revision Act 1874 (37 & 38 Vict. c. 35))
Army (Artillery, &c.,) Pensions Act 1833 (repealed)	3 & 4 Will. 4. c. 29	24 July 1833
An Act to make further Provisions with respect to the Payment of Pensions granted for Service in the Royal Artillery, Engineers, and other Military Corps under the Controul of the Master General and Board of Ordnance, and with respect to Deductions hereafter to be made from Pensions granted by the Commissioners of Chelsea Hospital. (Repealed by Statute Law (Repeals) Act 2008 (c. 12))
Poor Rate Exemption Act 1833 (repealed)	3 & 4 Will. 4. c. 30	24 July 1833
An Act to exempt from Poor and Church Rates all Churches, Chapels, and other Places of Religious Worship. (Repealed by Rating and Valuation (Miscellaneous Provisions) Act 1955 (4 & 5 Eliz. 2. c. 9) and Statute Law (Repeals) Act 1975 (c. 10))
Sunday Observance Act 1833	3 & 4 Will. 4. c. 31	24 July 1833
An Act to enable the Election of Officers of Corporations and other Public Companies now required to be held on the Lord;'s Day to be held on the Saturday next preceding, or on the Monday next ensuing.
Loans for Public Works Act 1833 (repealed)	3 & 4 Will. 4. c. 32	24 July 1833
An Act to amend the several Acts authorizing Advances for carrying on Public Works. (Repealed by Public Works Loans Act 1875 (38 & 39 Vict. c. 89))
Roads, etc. (Scotland) Act 1833 (repealed)	3 & 4 Will. 4. c. 33	24 July 1833
An Act to amend Three Acts (Note: Highland Roads (Scotland) Act 1819 (59 Geo. 3. c. 135)) (Note: Military Roads, etc. (Scotland) Act 1823 (4 Geo. 4. c. 56)) (Note: Highland Roads (Scotland) Act 1824 (5 Geo. 4. c. 38)) passed for maintaining and keeping in repair the Military and Parliamentary Roads and Bridges in the Highlands of Scotland, and to improve certain Lines of Communication in the Counties of Inverness and Ross. (Repealed by Statute Law Revision Act 1874 (37 & 38 Vict. c. 35))
Assessed Taxes Act 1833 (repealed)	3 & 4 Will. 4. c. 34	24 July 1833
An Act to continue, until the Fifth Day of April One thousand eight hundred and thirty-five, Compositions for the Assessed Taxes. (Repealed by Revenue Act 1869 (32 & 33 Vict. c. 14))
Inclosure and Drainage (Rates) Act 1833	3 & 4 Will. 4. c. 35	24 July 1833
An Act to remedy certain Defects as to the Recovery of Rates and Assessments made by Commissioners and other Persons under divers Inclosure and Drainage Acts after the Execution of the final Awards of the said Commissioners.
Commissioners of Lunacy Act 1833 (repealed)	3 & 4 Will. 4. c. 36	24 July 1833
An Act to diminish the Inconvenience and Expence of Commissions in the Nature of Writs De lunatieo inquirendo; and to provide for the better Care and Treatment of Idiots, Lunatics, and Persons of unsound Mind, found such by Inquisition. (Repealed by Lunacy Regulation Act 1853 (16 & 17 Vict. c. 70))
Church Temporalities (Ireland) Act 1833 or the Church Temporalities Act 1833 (repealed)	3 & 4 Will. 4. c. 37	14 August 1833
An Act to alter and amend the Laws relating to the Temporalities of the Church in Ireland. (Repealed by Statute Law Revision Act 1874 (37 & 38 Vict. c. 35))
Forest of Dean Act 1833 (repealed)	3 & 4 Will. 4. c. 38	14 August 1833
An Act to extend to the Twenty-first Day of January One thousand eight hundred and thirty-four, and to the End of the then next Session of Parliament, the Time for carrying into execution an Act of the First and Second Years of His present Majesty, for ascertaining the Boundaries of the Forest of Dean, and for inquiring into the Rights and Privileges claimed by Free Miners of the Hundred of Saint Briavels, and for other Purposes. (Repealed by Statute Law Revision Act 1874 (37 & 38 Vict. c. 35))
Assessed Taxes (No. 2) Act 1833 (repealed)	3 & 4 Will. 4. c. 39	14 August 1833
An Act to reduce certain of the Duties on Dwelling Houses, and to repeal other Duties of Assessed Taxes. (Repealed by Revenue Act 1869 (32 & 33 Vict. c. 14))
Poor Removal Act 1833 (repealed)	3 & 4 Will. 4. c. 40	14 August 1833
An Act to repeal certain Acts relating to the Removal of poor Persons born in Scotland and Ireland, and chargeable to Parishes in England, and to make other Provisions in lieu thereof, until the First Day of May One thousand eight hundred and thirty-six, and to the End of the then next, Session of Parliament. (Repealed by Poor Removal Act 1845 (8 & 9 Vict. c. 117))
Judicial Committee Act 1833	3 & 4 Will. 4. c. 41	14 August 1833
An Act for the better Administration of Justice in His Majesty’s Privy Council.
Civil Procedure Act 1833 (repealed)	3 & 4 Will. 4. c. 42	14 August 1833
An Act for the further Amendment of the Law, and the better Advancement of Justice. (Repealed by Administration of Justice Act 1965 (c. 2))
Holyhead Road Act 1833	3 & 4 Will. 4. c. 43	14 August 1833
An Act for transferring to the Commissioners of His Majesty's Woods and Forests the several Powers now vested in the Holyhead Road Commissioners, and for discharging the last-mentioned Commissioners from the future Repairs and Maintenance of the Roads, Harbours, and Bridges now under their Care and Management.
Criminal Law Act 1833 (repealed)	3 & 4 Will. 4. c. 44	14 August 1833
An Act to repeal so much of Two Acts of the Seventh and Eighth Years (Note: Larceny Act 1827 (7 & 8 Geo. 4. c. 29)) and the Ninth Year (Note: Larceny (Ireland) Act 1828 (9 Geo. 4. c. 55)) of King George the Fourth as inflicts the Punishment of Death upon Persons breaking, entering, and stealing in a Dwelling House; also for giving Power to the Judges to add to the Punishment of Transportation for Life in certain Cases of Forgery, and in certain other Cases. (Repealed by Statute Law Revision Act 1874 (37 & 38 Vict. c. 35))
Marriages at Hamburg Act 1833 (repealed)	3 & 4 Will. 4. c. 45	14 August 1833
An Act to declare valid Marriages solemnized at Hamburgh since the Abolition of the British Factory there. (Repealed by Foreign Marriage (Amendment) Act 1988 (c. 44))
Burgh Police (Scotland) Act 1833 (repealed)	3 & 4 Will. 4. c. 46	14 August 1833
An Act to enable Burghs in Scotland to establish a general System of Police. (Repealed by Burgh Police (Scotland) Act 1892 (55 & 56 Vict. c. 55))
Court of Bankruptcy (England) Act 1833 (repealed)	3 & 4 Will. 4. c. 47	28 August 1833
An Act to authorize His Majesty to give further Powers to the Judges of the Court of Bankruptcy, and to direct the Times of sitting of the Judges and Commissioners of the said Court. (Repealed by Bankrupt Law Consolidation Act 1849 (12 & 13 Vict. c. 106))
London Hackney Carriages Act 1833 (repealed)	3 & 4 Will. 4. c. 48	28 August 1833
An Act to amend an Act of the Second and Third Years of His present Majesty, (Note: Stage Carriages Act 1832 (2 & 3 Will. 4. c. 120)) relating to Stage Carriages in Great Britain; and also to explain and amend an Act of the First and Second Years of His present Majesty, relating to Hackney Carriages used in the Metropolis. (Repealed by Statute Law Revision Act 1959 (7 & 8 Eliz. 2. c. 68))
Quakers and Moravians Act 1833 (repealed)	3 & 4 Will. 4. c. 49	28 August 1833
An Act to allow Quakers and Moravians to make Affirmation in all Cases where an Oath is or shall be required. (Repealed by Statute Law (Repeals) Act 1977 (c. 18))
Customs (Repeal) Act 1833 (repealed)	3 & 4 Will. 4. c. 50	28 August 1833
An Act to repeal the several Laws relating to the Customs. (Repealed by Statute Law Revision Act 1960 (8 & 9 Eliz. 2. c. 56))
Customs, etc. Act 1833 (repealed)	3 & 4 Will. 4. c. 51	28 August 1833
An Act for the Management of the Customs. (Repealed by Customs (Repeal) Act 1845 (8 & 9 Vict. c. 84))
Customs, etc. (No. 2) Act 1833 (repealed)	3 & 4 Will. 4. c. 52	28 August 1833
An Act for the general Regulation of the Customs. (Repealed by Customs (Repeal) Act 1845 (8 & 9 Vict. c. 84))
Customs, etc. (No. 3) Act 1833 (repealed)	3 & 4 Will. 4. c. 53	28 August 1833
An Act for the Prevention of Smuggling. (Repealed by Customs (Repeal) Act 1845 (8 & 9 Vict. c. 84))
Customs, etc. (No. 4) Act 1833 (repealed)	3 & 4 Will. 4. c. 54	28 August 1833
An Act for the Encouragement of British Shipping and Navigation. (Repealed by Customs (Repeal) Act 1845 (8 & 9 Vict. c. 84))
Customs, etc. (No. 5) Act 1833 (repealed)	3 & 4 Will. 4. c. 55	28 August 1833
An Act for the registering of British Vessels. (Repealed by Customs (Repeal) Act 1845 (8 & 9 Vict. c. 84))
Customs, etc. (No. 6) Act 1833 (repealed)	3 & 4 Will. 4. c. 56	28 August 1833
An Act for granting Duties of Customs. (Repealed by Customs (Repeal) Act 1845 (8 & 9 Vict. c. 84))
Customs, etc. (No. 7) Act 1833 (repealed)	3 & 4 Will. 4. c. 57	28 August 1833
An Act for the warehousing of Goods. (Repealed by Customs (Repeal) Act 1845 (8 & 9 Vict. c. 84))
Customs, etc. (No. 8) Act 1833 (repealed)	3 & 4 Will. 4. c. 58	28 August 1833
An Act to grant certain Bounties and Allowances of Customs. (Repealed by Customs (Repeal) Act 1845 (8 & 9 Vict. c. 84))
Customs, etc. (No. 9) Act 1833 (repealed)	3 & 4 Will. 4. c. 59	28 August 1833
An Act to regulate the Trade of the British Possessions Abroad. (Repealed by Customs (Repeal) Act 1845 (8 & 9 Vict. c. 84))
Customs, etc. (No. 10) Act 1833 (repealed)	3 & 4 Will. 4. c. 60	28 August 1833
An Act for regulating the Trade of the Isle of Man. (Repealed by Customs (Repeal) Act 1845 (8 & 9 Vict. c. 84))
Customs, etc. (No. 11) Act 1833 (repealed)	3 & 4 Will. 4. c. 61	28 August 1833
An Act to admit Sugar without Payment of Duty to be refined for Exportation. (Repealed by Customs (Repeal) Act 1845 (8 & 9 Vict. c. 84))
Militia Pay Act 1833 (repealed)	3 & 4 Will. 4. c. 62	28 August 1833
An Act to defray the Charge of the Pay, Clothing, and contingent and other Expences of the Disembodied Militia in Great Britain and Ireland; and to grant Allowances in certain Cases to Subaltern Officers, Adjutants, Paymasters, Quartermasters, Surgeons, Assistant Surgeons, Surgeons Mates, and Serjeant Majors of the Militia, until the First Day of July One thousand eight hundred and thirty-four. (Repealed by Statute Law Revision Act 1874 (37 & 38 Vict. c. 35))
Apprentices Act 1833 (repealed)	3 & 4 Will. 4. c. 63	28 August 1833
An Act to render valid Indentures of Apprenticeship allowed only by Two Justices acting for the County in which the Parish from which such Apprentices shall be bound, and for the County in which the Parish into which such Apprentices shall be bound, shall be situated; and also for remedying defective Executions of Indentures by Corporations. (Repealed by Poor Law Act 1927 (17 & 18 Geo. 5. c. 14))
Lunatics (England) Act 1833 (repealed)	3 & 4 Will. 4. c. 64	28 August 1833
An Act to amend an Act of the Second and Third Year of His present Majesty, (Note: Insane Persons (England) Act 1832 (2 & 3 Will. 4. c. 107)) for regulating the Care and Treatment of Insane Persons in England. (Repealed by Lunacy Act 1845 (8 & 9 Vict. c. 100))
Woolwich Dockyard Act 1833	3 & 4 Will. 4. c. 65	28 August 1833
An Act to enable the Commissioners for executing the Office of Lord High Admiral of the United Kingdom to acquire certain Lands at Woolwich in the County of Kent, for better securing His Majesty's Docks there, and for the Improvement of the same.
Duties of Package, etc., London Act 1833 (repealed)	3 & 4 Will. 4. c. 66	28 August 1833
An Act to authorize the Commissioners of His Majesty's Treasury to purchase the Duties of Package, Scavage, Balliage, and Porterage belonging to the Corporation of London. (Repealed by Statute Law Revision Act 1874 (37 & 38 Vict. c. 35))
Writs of Execution Act 1833 (repealed)	3 & 4 Will. 4. c. 67	28 August 1833
An Act to amend an Act of the Second Year of His present Majesty, (Note: Process in Courts of Law at Westminster Act 1832 (2 & 3 Will. 4. c. 39)) for the Uniformity of Process in Personal Actions in His Majesty's Courts of Law at Westminster. (Repealed by Civil Procedure Acts Repeal Act 1879 (42 & 43 Vict. c. 59))
Licensing (Ireland) Act 1833 (repealed)	3 & 4 Will. 4. c. 68	28 August 1833
An Act to amend the Laws relating to the Sale of Wine, Spirits, Beer, and Cider by Retail in Ireland. (Repealed for Northern Ireland by Licensing Act (Northern Ireland) 1971 (c. 13 (N.I.)))
Crown Lands Act 1833 (repealed)	3 & 4 Will. 4. c. 69	28 August 1833
An Act to extend and enlarge the Powers of the Commissioners of His Majesty’s Woods, Forests, Land Revenues, Works, and Buildings, in relation to the Management and Disposition of the Land Revenue of the Crown of Scotland. (Repealed by Statute Law Revision Act 1950 (14 Geo. 6. c. 6))
Public Notaries Act 1833 (repealed)	3 & 4 Will. 4. c. 70	28 August 1833
An Act to alter and amend an Act of the Forty-first Year Of His Majesty King George the Third, (Note: Public Notaries Act 1801 (41 Geo. 3. (U.K.) c. 79)) for the better Regulation of Public Notaries in England. (Repealed by Courts and Legal Services Act 1990 (c. 41))
Assizes Act 1833 (repealed)	3 & 4 Will. 4. c. 71	28 August 1833
An Act for the Appointment of convenient Places for the holding of Assizes in England and Wales. (Repealed by Supreme Court of Judicature (Consolidation) Act 1925 (15 & 16 Geo. 5. c. 49))
Slave Trade Act 1833 (repealed)	3 & 4 Will. 4. c. 72	28 August 1833
An Act for carrying into effect Two Conventions with the King of the French for suppressing the Slave Trade. (Repealed by Slave Trade Act 1873 (36 & 37 Vict. c. 88))
Slavery Abolition Act 1833 (repealed)	3 & 4 Will. 4. c. 73	28 August 1833
An Act for the Abolition of Slavery throughout the British Colonies; for promoting the Industry of the manumitted Slaves and for compensating the Persons hitherto entitled to the Services of such Slaves. (Repealed by Statute Law (Repeals) Act 1998 (c. 43))
Fines and Recoveries Act 1833	3 & 4 Will. 4. c. 74	28 August 1833
An Act for the abolition of fines and recoveries, and for the substitution of more simple modes of assurance.
Cholera Prevention Act 1833 (repealed)	3 & 4 Will. 4. c. 75	28 August 1833
An Act to continue until the End of the next Session of Parliament Two Acts (Note: Cholera Prevention (England) Act 1832 (2 & 3 Will. 4. c. 10)) (Note: Cholera Prevention (Scotland) Act 1832 (2 & 3 Will. 4. c. 11)) for the Prevention, as far as may be possible, of the Disease called the Cholera, or Spasmodic or Indian Cholera, in England and Scotland. (Repealed by Statute Law Revision Act 1874 (37 & 38 Vict. c. 35))
Royal Burghs (Scotland) Act 1833 or the Royal Burghs Reform Act 1833 (repealed)	3 & 4 Will. 4. c. 76	28 August 1833
An Act to alter and amend the Laws for the Election of the Magistrates and Councils of the Royal Burghs in Scotland. (Repealed by Town Councils (Scotland) Act 1900 (63 & 64 Vict. c. 49))
Parliamentary Burghs (Scotland) Act 1833 (repealed)	3 & 4 Will. 4. c. 77	28 August 1833
An Act to provide for the Appointment and Election of Magistrates and Councillors for the several Burghs and Towns of Scotland which now return or contribute to return Members to Parliament and are not Royal Burghs. (Repealed by Town Councils (Scotland) Act 1900 (63 & 64 Vict. c. 49))
Grand Jury (Ireland) Act 1833	3 & 4 Will. 4. c. 78	28 August 1833
An Act to amend the Laws relating to Grand Juries in Ireland.
Trial of Offences (Ireland) Act 1833 (repealed)	3 & 4 Will. 4. c. 79	28 August 1833
An Act to provide for the more impartial Trial of Offences in certain Cases in Ireland. (Repealed by Statute Law Revision Act 1874 (37 & 38 Vict. c. 35))
Turnpike Trusts Returns Act 1833 (repealed)	3 & 4 Will. 4. c. 80	28 August 1833
An Act requiring the Annual Statements of Trustees or Commissioners of Turnpike Roads to be transmitted to the Secretary of State, and afterwards laid before Parliament. (Repealed by Statute Law (Repeals) Act 1981 (c. 19))
Buckingham Palace Act 1833 (repealed)	3 & 4 Will. 4. c. 81	28 August 1833
An Act to authorize the Application of Part of the Land Revenue of the Crown for providing Fixtures, Furniture, Fittings, and Decorations for Buckingham Palace. (Repealed by Statute Law Revision Act 1874 (37 & 38 Vict. c. 35))
Separatists' Affirmations Act 1833 (repealed)	3 & 4 Will. 4. c. 82	28 August 1833
An Act to allow the People called Separatists to make a solemn Affirmation and Declaration instead of an Oath. (Repealed by Statute Law Revision Act 1890 (53 & 54 Vict. c. 33))
Bank Notes Act 1833 (repealed)	3 & 4 Will. 4. c. 83	28 August 1833
An Act to compel Banks issuing Promissory Notes payable to Bearer on Demand to make Returns of their Notes in Circulation, and to authorize Banks to issue Notes payable in London for less than Fifty Pounds. (Repealed by Statute Law (Repeals) Act 1973 (c. 39))
Lord Chancellor's Offices Act 1833 (repealed)	3 & 4 Will. 4. c. 84	28 August 1833
An Act to provide for the Performance of the Duties of certain Offices connected with the Court of Chancery which have been abolished. (Repealed by Crown Office Act 1890 (53 & 54 Vict. c. 2))
Government of India Act 1833 renamed to the Saint Helena Act 1833	3 & 4 Will. 4. c. 85	28 August 1833
An Act for effecting an Arrangement with the East India Company, and for the better Government of His Majesty’s Indian Territories, till the Thirtieth Day of April One thousand eight hundred and fifty-four.
Crown Lands (Scotland) Act 1833 (repealed)	3 & 4 Will. 4. c. 86	28 August 1833
An Act to provide for the Payment of certain ancient Grants and Allowances formerly paid out of the Civil List Revenues. (Repealed by Statute Law Revision Act 1950 (14 Geo. 6. c. 6))
Inclosure Act 1833 (repealed)	3 & 4 Will. 4. c. 87	28 August 1833
An Act for remedying a Defect in Titles to Messuages, Lands, Tenements, and Hereditaments allotted, sold, divided, or exchanged under Acts of Inclosure, in consequence of the Award not having been inrolled, or not having been inrolled within the time limited by the several Acts; and for authorizing the Appointment of new Commissioners in certain Cases where the same shall have been omitted. (Repealed by Statute Law Revision Act 1950 (14 Geo. 6. c. 6))
Merchant Seamen Act 1833 (repealed)	3 & 4 Will. 4. c. 88	28 August 1833
An Act to continue for Seven Years, and from thence to the End of the then next Session of Parliament, an Act of the Fifty-ninth Year of King George the Third, (Note: Wages of Merchant Seamen Act 1819 (59 Geo. 3. c. 58)) for facilitating the Recovery of the Wages of Seamen in the Merchants Service. (Repealed by Merchant Seamen Act 1835 (5 & 6 Will. 4. c. 19))
Metropolitan Police Act 1833 (repealed)	3 & 4 Will. 4. c. 89	28 August 1833
An Act to authorize the Issue of a Sum of Money out of the Consolidated Fund towards the Support of the Metropolitan Police. (Repealed by Police Rate Act 1868 (31 & 32 Vict. c. 67))
Lighting and Watching Act 1833 (repealed)	3 & 4 Will. 4. c. 90	28 August 1833
An Act to repeal an Act of the Eleventh Year of His late Majesty King George the Fourth, for the lighting and watching of Parishes in England and Wales, (Note: Lighting, etc., of Parishes (England) Act 1830 (11 Geo. 4 & 1 Will. 4. c. 27)) and to make other Provisions in lieu thereof. (Repealed by Parish Councils Act 1957 (5 & 6 Eliz. 2. c. 42))
Juries (Ireland) Act 1833 (repealed)	3 & 4 Will. 4. c. 91	28 August 1833
An Act for consolidating and amending the Laws relative to Jurors and Juries in Ireland. (Repealed by Statute Law Revision (No. 2) Act 1888 (51 & 52 Vict. c. 57))
County Infirmaries (Ireland) Act 1833 (repealed)	3 & 4 Will. 4. c. 92	28 August 1833
An Act to explain and amend the Provisions of certain Acts for the erecting and establishing Public Infirmaries, Hospitals, and Dispensaries in Ireland. (Repealed by Statute Law Revision Act 1874 (37 & 38 Vict. c. 35), Statute Law Revision (No. 2) Act 1888 (51 & 52 Vict. c. 57), Statute Law Revision (No. 2) Act 1890 (53 & 54 Vict. c. 51), Statute Law Revision Act 1891 (54 & 55 Vict. c. 67) and Health Services Act (Northern Ireland) 1948 (c. 3 (N.I.)))
China Trade Act 1833 (repealed)	3 & 4 Will. 4. c. 93	28 August 1833
An Act to regulate the Trade to China and India. (Repealed by British Subjects in China Act 1843 (6 & 7 Vict. c. 80), Statute Law Revision Act 1874 (37 & 38 Vict. c. 35), Statute Law Revision (No. 2) Act 1888 (51 & 52 Vict. c. 57), Public Authorities Protection Act 1893 (56 & 57 Vict. c. 61) and Statute Law Revision Act 1950 (14 Geo. 6. c. 6))
Chancery Regulation Act 1833 or the Court of Chancery (England) Act 1833 (repealed)	3 & 4 Will. 4. c. 94	28 August 1833
An Act for the Regulation of the Proceedings and Practice of certain Offices of the High Court of Chancery in England. (Repealed by Statute Law Revision (No. 2) Act 1888 (51 & 52 Vict. c. 57))
Land Tax Commissioners (Appointment) Act 1833 (repealed)	3 & 4 Will. 4. c. 95	28 August 1833
An Act to appoint additional Commissioners for executing the Acts for granting an Aid by a Land Tax, and for continuing the Duties on Personal Estates, Offices, and Pensions. (Repealed by Statute Law Revision Act 1950 (14 Geo. 6. c. 6))
Appropriation Act 1833 (repealed)	3 & 4 Will. 4. c. 96	29 August 1833
An Act to apply the Sum of Six Millions out of the Consolidated Fund to the Service of the Year One thousand eight hundred and thirty-three; and to appropriate the Supplies granted in this Session of Parliament. (Repealed by Statute Law Revision Act 1874 (37 & 38 Vict. c. 35))
Stamps, etc. Act 1833 (repealed)	3 & 4 Will. 4. c. 97	29 August 1833
An Act to prevent the selling and uttering of forged Stamps, and to exempt from Stamp Duty artificial Mineral Waters in Great Britain, and to allow a Drawback on the Exportation of Gold and Silver Plate manufactured in Ireland. (Repealed by Statute Law (Repeals) Act 1973 (c. 39))
Bank of England Act 1833 or the Bank Charter Act 1833 (repealed)	3 & 4 Will. 4. c. 98	29 August 1833
An Act for giving to the Corporation of the Governor and Company of the Bank of England certain Privileges for a limited Period, under certain Conditions. (Repealed by Statute Law (Repeals) Act 1973 (c. 39))
Fines Act 1833 (repealed)	3 & 4 Will. 4. c. 99	29 August 1833
An Act for facilitating the Appointment of Sheriffs, and the more effectual Audit and passing of their Accounts; and for the more speedy Return and Recovery of Fines Issues, forfeited Recognizances, Penalties, and Deodands; and to abolish certain Offices in the Court of Exchequer. (Repealed by Constitutional Reform Act 2005 (c. 4))
Composition for Tithes (Ireland) Act 1833 (repealed)	3 & 4 Will. 4. c. 100	29 August 1833
An Act for the Relief of the Owners of Tithes in Ireland, and for the Amendment of an Act passed in the last Session of Parliament, (Note: Composition for Tithes (Ireland) Act 1832 (2 & 3 Will. 4 c. 119)) intituled "An Act to amend Three Acts passed respectively in the Fourth, (Note: Composition for Tithes (Ireland) Act 1823 (4 Geo. 4. c. 99)) Fifth, (Note: Composition for Tithes (Ireland) Act 1824 (5 Geo. 4. c. 63)) and in the Seventh and Eighth (Note: Compositions for Tithes (Ireland) Act 1827 (7 & 8 Geo. 4. c. 60)) Years of the Reign of His late Majesty King George the Fourth, providing for the establishing of Compositions for Tithes in Ireland, and to make such Compositions permanent." (Repealed by Statute Law Revision Act 1874 (37 & 38 Vict. c. 35))
Tea Duties Act 1833 (repealed)	3 & 4 Will. 4. c. 101	29 August 1833
An Act to provide for the Collection and Management of the Duties on Tea. (Repealed by Customs Amendment Act 1859 (22 & 23 Vict. c. 37))
Marriages by Roman Catholics (Ireland) Act 1833 (repealed)	3 & 4 Will. 4. c. 102	29 August 1833
An Act to repeal certain penal Enactments made in the Parliament of Ireland against Roman Catholic Clergymen for celebrating Marriages contrary to the Provisions of certain Acts made in the Parliament of Ireland. (Repealed by Statute Law Revision Act 1874 (37 & 38 Vict. c. 35))
Labour of Children, etc., in Factories Act 1833 or the Factory Act 1833 or Althorp's Act (repealed)	3 & 4 Will. 4. c. 103	29 August 1833
An Act to regulate the Labour of Children and young Persons in the Mills and Factories of the United Kingdom. (Repealed by Factory and Workshop Act 1878 (41 & 42 Vict. c. 16))
Administration of Estates Act 1833 (repealed)	3 & 4 Will. 4. c. 104	29 August 1833
An Act to render Freehold and Copyhold Estates Assets for the Payment of Simple and Contract Debts. (Repealed for England and Wales by Administration of Estates Act 1925 (15 & 16 Geo. 5. c. 23))
Dower Act 1833 (repealed)	3 & 4 Will. 4. c. 105	29 August 1833
An Act for the Amendment of the Law relating to Dower. (Repealed for England and Wales by Administration of Estates Act 1925 (15 & 16 Geo. 5. c. 23))
Inheritance Act 1833	3 & 4 Will. 4. c. 106	29 August 1833
An Act for the Amendment of the Law of Inheritance.

=== Local acts ===
Short title	Citation	Royal assent
Long title
Broxtowe Hundred Damages Compensation Act 1833 (repealed)	3 & 4 Will. 4. c. i	29 March 1833 (Note: The date of royal assent of this act is incorrectly printed as 29 March 1832 in the King's Printer's copy. The act received royal assent on 29 March 1833.)
An Act for raising Money to pay Compensation for Damages committed within the Hundred of Broxtowe in the County of Nottingham during the late Riots and Tumults therein. (Repealed by Statute Law (Repeals) Act 1995 (c. 44))
Bosmere and Claydon Poor Relief Act 1833 (repealed)	3 & 4 Will. 4. c. ii	29 March 1833
An Act for repealing an Act passed in the Fourth Year of the Reign of His Majesty King George the Third (Note: Bosmere and Claydon, Suffolk (Poor Relief) Act 1764 (4 Geo. 3. c. 57)) for the better Relief and Employment of the Poor in the Hundred of Bosmere and Claydon in the County of Suffolk, and for granting more effectual Powers instead thereof. (Repealed by Statute Law (Repeals) Act 2013 (c. 2))
Congleton and Buglawton Gas Act 1833	3 & 4 Will. 4. c. iii	29 March 1833
An Act for lighting with Gas the Borough of Congleton and the Township of Buglawton within the Parish of Astbury in the County of Chester.
Clarence Railway Act 1833	3 & 4 Will. 4. c. iv	29 March 1833
An Act to enable the Clarence Railway Company to make certain additional Branch Railways; and to amend and enlarge the Powers of the several Acts for making and maintaining the said Railway.
Saltash Roads Act 1833 (repealed)	3 & 4 Will. 4. c. v	29 March 1833
An Act for more effectually repairing and improving several Roads in the Counties of Cornwall and Devon, leading to the Borough of Saltash in the County of Cornwall, and for making a new Branch and Deviations of Roads to communicate therewith. (Repealed by Saltash Road Act 1866 (29 & 30 Vict. c. cix))
Dunsford and Cherry Brook Road (Devon) Act 1833	3 & 4 Will. 4. c. vi	29 March 1833
An Act for repairing the Road from Reedy Gate in the Parish of Dunsford, through Moretonhampstead to Cherry Brook in the Forest of Dartmoore in the County of Devon.
Darly Moor and Ellaston Road (Derbyshire) Act 1833	3 & 4 Will. 4. c. vii	29 March 1833
An Act for repairing the Road from Darly Moor in the County of Derby to Ellaston in the County of Stafford, and from thence to the Turnpike Road between Leek in the same County and Ashborne in the County of Derby.
Rochdale and Bury Road Act 1833 (repealed)	3 & 4 Will. 4. c. viii	29 March 1833
An Act for repairing and maintaining the Road from the Guide Post near Sudden Bridge in the Parish of Rochdale to Bury, and a Branch therefrom, all in the County Palatine of Lancaster. (Repealed by Sudden Bridge and Bury Roads Act 1864 (27 & 28 Vict. c. xxiv))
York and Scarborough, and Spittle House and Scarborough Roads Act 1833	3 & 4 Will. 4. c. ix	29 March 1833
An Act for repairing the Roads from near Monk Bridge near York, to New Malton, and from thence to Scarborough, and from Spittle House to Scarborough, all in the County of York.
Ipswich and Debenham, and Hemingston and Otley Bottom Roads Act 1833 (repealed)	3 & 4 Will. 4. c. x	29 March 1833
An Act for more effectually repairing and improving the Roads from Ipswich to Helmingham and to Debenham, and from Hemingston to Otley Bottom, in the County of Suffolk. (Repealed by Statute Law (Repeals) Act 2008 (c. 12))
Roads from Swell Wold, Cheltenham and Winchcomb Act 1833 (repealed)	3 & 4 Will. 4. c. xi	29 March 1833
An Act for more effectually repairing the Roads from Swell Wold to the Turnpike Road leading from Tewkesbury to Stow, and from Cheltenham to Sedgborough, and from Winchcomb to the said Turnpike Road from Tewkesbury to Stow; and also for making a new Branch from the said Road in Winchcomb to the Turnpike Road leading from Cheltenham to London at Andoversford in the Parish of Dowdeswell, in the County of Gloucester. (Repealed by Winchcomb Roads Act 1865 (28 & 29 Vict. c. clxxi))
Wendover and Oak Lane, and River Colne and Beaconsfield Roads Act 1833	3 & 4 Will. 4. c. xii	29 March 1833
An Act for more effectually repairing and improving the Roads from Wendover to the End of Oak Lane, and from the River Colne for Half a Mile towards Beaconsfield, in the County of Bucks.
Barnsley and Cudworth Bridge Road Act 1833 (repealed)	3 & 4 Will. 4. c. xiii	29 March 1833
An Act for repairing and improving the Road from Barnsley to Cudworth Bridge, and from thence into the Turnpike Road leading from Wakefield to Doncaster, and other Roads connected therewith, all in the West Riding of the County of York. (Repealed by Annual Turnpike Acts Continuance Act 1870 (33 & 34 Vict. c. 73))
Helston Roads Act 1833 (repealed)	3 & 4 Will. 4. c. xiv	29 March 1833
An Act for making repairing and improving certain Roads leading to and from Helston in the County of Cornwall. (Repealed by Helston Turnpike Roads Act 1865 (28 & 29 Vict. c. x))
Norwich and Watton Road Act 1833 (repealed)	3 & 4 Will. 4. c. xv	29 March 1833
An Act for more effectually repairing the Road from the City of Norwich to the Windmill in the Town of Watton in the County of Norfolk, and for making a new Branch of Road to communicate therewith. (Repealed by Statute Law (Repeals) Act 2008 (c. 12))
Wellesbourne Mountford and Stratford-upon-Avon Road Act 1833	3 & 4 Will. 4. c. xvi	29 March 1833
An Act for repairing the Road from Wellsbourn Mountfort to Stratford-upon-Avon in the County of Warwick.
Bishop's Waltham and Owlesbury Road (Hampshire) Act 1833	3 & 4 Will. 4. c. xvii	29 March 1833
An Act for making and maintaining a Road from Bishop's Waltham to join the Botley and Winchester Road at or near Fisher's Pond in the Parish of Owslebury in the County of Southampton.
Manchester and Mottram Road Act 1833 (repealed)	3 & 4 Will. 4. c. xviii	2 April 1833
An Act for more effectually repairing and improving the Road from the End of Ardwick Green near Manchester in the County Palatine of Lancaster to Mottram in Longdendale in the County Palatine of Chester. (Repealed by Manchester, Hyde and Mottram Road Act 1858 (21 & 22 Vict. c. xxxvii))
Thornset and Disley Road Act 1833 (repealed)	3 & 4 Will. 4. c. xix	2 April 1833
An Act for more effectually making and maintaining a Road from Thornset in the County of Derby to Furnace Colliery within Disley in the County of Chester, and for making and maintaining several Additions thereto. (Repealed by Thornset Turnpike Roads Act 1864 (27 & 28 Vict. c. xxxvii))
Stretton-upon-Dunsmore Parish Church Act 1833	3 & 4 Will. 4. c. xx	20 April 1833
An Act for taking down the Parish Church of Stretton-upon-Dunsmore in the County of Warwick and Diocese of Lichfield and Coventry, and building a new Church in lieu thereof.
Cheltenham Sewerage, Cleansing and Draining Act 1833	3 & 4 Will. 4. c. xxi	20 April 1833
An Act for the better Sewage, cleansing, and draining of the Town of Cheltenham in the County of Gloucester.
Moses Gate District of Road (Lancashire) Act 1833 (repealed)	3 & 4 Will. 4. c. xxii	20 April 1833
An Act for more effectually repairing and improving the Road from Bolton to Kearsley called the Moses Gate District of Road, and a Branch thereout from Stone Clough to Pilkington, all in the County of Lancaster. (Repealed by Moses Gate and Ringley Road Act 1865 (28 & 29 Vict. c. cccxxxvi))
Goudhurst Roads Act 1833	3 & 4 Will. 4. c. xxiii	20 April 1833
An Act to rectify a Mistake in an Act of the last Session of Parliament, (Note: Roads to and through Goudhurst Act 1832 (2 & 3 Will. 4. c. lxxiv)) for more effectually repairing and improving certain Roads leading to and through the Town of Goudhurst in the County of Kent.
Bicester and Aylesbury Road Act 1833 (repealed)	3 & 4 Will. 4. c. xxiv	20 April 1833
An Act for repairing the Road from Bicester in the County of Oxford to Aylesbury in the County of Buckingham. (Repealed by Annual Turnpike Acts Continuance Act 1875 (38 & 39 Vict. c. cxciv))
Flint, Holywell and Mostyn Districts of Road Act 1833 (repealed)	3 & 4 Will. 4. c. xxv	20 April 1833
An Act for more effectually repairing and improving the several Roads comprising the Flint, Holywell, and Mostyn Districts of Roads in the County of Flint, and for making new Deviations and Extensions of Roads to communicate with the said Districts. (Repealed by Flint, Holywell and Mostyn Roads Act 1863 (26 & 27 Vict. c. xxx))
Road from Pant Evan Brook to Abergele Act 1833 (repealed)	3 & 4 Will. 4. c. xxvi	20 April 1833
An Act for the more effectually repairing and maintaining the Turnpike Road from Pant Evan Brook in the County of Flint to Abergele in the County of Denbigh, and thence to Conway Ferry House in the County of Carnarvon. (Repealed by St. Asaph and Conway Turnpike Road Act 1863 (26 & 27 Vict. c. xix))
Denbigh and Mold Road and Branch Act 1833	3 & 4 Will. 4. c. xxvii	20 April 1833
An Act for repairing and maintaining the Roads from Denbigh to the Northop and Holywell Road, and from Afon Wen to Mold, and also a Branch of Road leading from Northop to Mold, near a Place called Black Brook, and extending over Rhydgoleû Bridge, by Rhûal, to a certain Bridge called Pontnewydd, in the Counties of Denbigh and Flint.
Cranbrook and Sandhurst, and Benenden and Rolvenden Cross Roads Act 1833	3 & 4 Will. 4. c. xxviii	20 April 1833
An Act for repairing and maintaining the Roads from the Turnpike Road at Golford Green in the Parish of Cranbrooke to the Turnpike Road in the Parish of Sandhurst, and from the Village of Benenden to the Bull Inn at Rolvenden Cross in the County of Kent.
River Rother and Channel of Appledore Drainage Act 1833	3 & 4 Will. 4. c. xxix	6 May 1833
An Act to amend Two Acts (Note: Kent and Sussex Marsh Lands Drainage Act 1826 (7 Geo. 4. c. cxxii)) (Note: Kent and Sussex Drainage Act 1830 (11 Geo. 4 & 1 Will. 4. c. cxxxvi)) for more effectually draining and preserving certain Marsh Lands or Low Grounds in the Counties of Kent and Sussex, draining into the River Rother and Channel of Appledore.
Newbold-upon-Stour Parish Act 1833	3 & 4 Will. 4. c. xxx	6 May 1833
An Act for making the Hamlets of Newbold and Armscott a separate Parish from the Parish of Tredington in the County and Diocese of Worcester; and for building a Church and providing a Churchyard and Parsonage House at Newbold.
Exeter and Parish of St. David Water Act 1833	3 & 4 Will. 4. c. xxxi	6 May 1833
An Act for better supplying with Water the City and County of the City of Exeter, and such Part of the Parish of Saint David as is situated in the County of Devon.
Exeter Water Act 1833	3 & 4 Will. 4. c. xxxii	6 May 1833
An Act for more effectually supplying with Water the City and County of the City of Exeter and Places adjacent thereto.
St. Giles, Camberwell, Rates Act 1833 (repealed)	3 & 4 Will. 4. c. xxxiii	6 May 1833
An Act to alter and amend an Act of the Fifty-third Year of His late Majesty King George the Third, (Note: St. Giles Camberwell Parochial Rates, Workhouse, Cemetery, &c. Act 1813 (53 Geo. 3. c. clxii)) for better assessing and collecting the Poor and other Rates in the Parish of Saint Giles, Camberwell, in the County of Surrey, and regulating the Affairs thereof, and for other Purposes relating thereto. (Repealed by London Government (Borough of Camberwell) Order in Council 1901 (SR&O 1901/213))
Grand Junction Railway Act 1833 (repealed)	3 & 4 Will. 4. c. xxxiv	6 May 1833
An Act for making a Railway from the Warrington and Newton Railway at Warrington in the County of Lancaster to Birmingham in the County of Warwick, to be called the Grand Junction Railway. (Repealed by London and North Western Railway Act 1846 (9 & 10 Vict. c. cciv))
Whitby and Pickering Railway Act 1833	3 & 4 Will. 4. c. xxxv	6 May 1833
An Act for making a Railway from Whitby to Pickering in the North Riding of the County of York.
London and Birmingham Railway Act 1833 (repealed)	3 & 4 Will. 4. c. xxxvi	6 May 1833
An Act for making a Railway from London to Birmingham. (Repealed by London and North Western Railway Act 1846 (9 & 10 Vict. c. cciv))
Roads in Cardiganshire Act 1833 (repealed)	3 & 4 Will. 4. c. xxxvii	6 May 1833
An Act for maintaining and improving several Roads in the County of Cardigan. (Repealed by Turnpike Trusts in South Wales Act 1844 (7 & 8 Vict. c. 91))
Egham Hill and Bagshot Road Act 1833 (repealed)	3 & 4 Will. 4. c. xxxviii	6 May 1833
An Act for more effectually repairing the Road from the Twenty Mile Stone on Egham Hill in the County of Surrey to a Place called Basingstone, (Note: The Basing Stone was located near the former Jolly Farmer public house, at the junction of the A30 and A325 roads.) near the Town of Bagshot in the Parish of Windlesham in the same County. (Repealed by Statute Law (Repeals) Act 2013 (c. 2))
Norwich and New Buckenham Road Act 1833 (repealed)	3 & 4 Will. 4. c. xxxix	6 May 1833
An Act for more effectually repairing, altering, widening, and otherwise improving the Road from Ber Street Gates in the City of Norwich to New Buckenham in the County of Norfolk. (Repealed by Statute Law (Repeals) Act 2008 (c. 12))
Chester, Neston and Woodside Ferry District of Roads Act 1833	3 & 4 Will. 4. c. xl	6 May 1833
An Act for improving certain Roads within the County Palatine of Chester, called The Chester, Neston, and Woodside Ferry District of Roads.
Upton, Great Kington and Wellesbourne Hastings Road (Warwickshire) Act 1833	3 & 4 Will. 4. c. xli	6 May 1833
An Act for repairing the Road from Upton in Ratley to Great Kington and Wellesbourne Hastings in the County of Warwick.
Roads from Hertford and Ware Act 1833	3 & 4 Will. 4. c. xlii	6 May 1833
An Act for more effectually repairing the several Roads leading from the Towns of Hertford and Ware and other Places in the County of Hertford.
Lewes to Brighton Road Act 1833	3 & 4 Will. 4. c. xliii	6 May 1833
An Act for more effectually repairing the Road from Lewes to Brighthelmstone (Note: Brighthelmstone is now known as Brighton.) in the County of Sussex.
Roads from Hodges to Cuckfield Act 1833	3 & 4 Will. 4. c. xliv	6 May 1833
An Act for more effectually repairing the Roads from Hodges to Beadles Hill and Cuckfield, and from Beadles Hill to Lindfield, all in the County of Sussex.
Main Trust Roads (Carmarthenshire) Act 1833 (repealed)	3 & 4 Will. 4. c. xlv	6 May 1833
An Act for repairing and improving several Roads called the Main Trust Roads, all in the County of Carmarthen, and making a new Piece of Road to communicate therewith from the Confines of the said County to King's Moor in the County of Pembroke. (Repealed by Turnpike Trusts in South Wales Act 1844 (7 & 8 Vict. c. 91))
London and Greenwich Railway Act 1833	3 & 4 Will. 4. c. xlvi	17 May 1833
An Act for making a Railway from London to Greenwich.
Taunton Improvement Act 1833 (repealed)	3 & 4 Will. 4. c. xlvii	17 May 1833
An Act for better regulating the Market, and cleansing the Streets, and preventing Nuisances in the Town of Taunton in the County of Somerset; and for amending Two several Acts of His late Majesty King George the Third (Note: Taunton (Improvements) Act 1769 (9 Geo. 3. c. 44)) (Note: Taunton Market Act 1817 (57 Geo. 3. c. lxv)) relative thereto. (Repealed by Taunton Corporation Act 1931 (21 & 22 Geo. 5. c. cii))
Wangford (Suffolk) Poor Relief Act 1833 (repealed)	3 & 4 Will. 4. c. xlviii	17 May 1833
An Act to alter and enlarge the Powers of several Acts (Note: Wangford, Suffolk (Poor Relief) Act 1764 (4 Geo. 3. c. 91)) (Note: Wangford (Suffolk) Poor Relief Act 1812 (52 Geo. 3. c. xii)) passed for the better Relief and Employment of the Poor in the Hundred of Wang ford in the County of Suffolk. (Repealed by Statute Law (Repeals) Act 2013 (c. 2))
Mutford and Lothingland (Suffolk) Poor Relief Act 1833 (repealed)	3 & 4 Will. 4. c. xlix	17 May 1833
An Act to alter amend and enlarge the Powers of an Act passed in the Fourth Year of the Reign of His Majesty King George the Third, intituled "An Act for the better Relief and Employment of the Poor in the Hundred of Mutford and Lothingland in the County of Suffolk." (Note: Mutford and Lothingland, Suffolk (Poor Relief) Act 1764 (4 Geo. 3. c. 89)) (Repealed by Local Government Board's Provisional Order Confirmation (Poor Law) Act 1892 (55 & 56 Vict. c. cciii))
Walton-upon-Trent Bridge Act 1833	3 & 4 Will. 4. c. l	17 May 1833
An Act for building a Bridge over the River Trent, from Walton upon Trent in the County of Derby to Barton under Needwood in the County of Stafford.
Gravesend and Milton Improvement Act 1833 (repealed)	3 & 4 Will. 4. c. li	17 May 1833
An Act for paving cleansing, lighting, watching, and improving the Town and Parishes of Gravesend and Milton in the County of Kent, and for removing and preventing Nuisances and Annoyances therein. (Repealed by Gravesend Improvement Act 1856 (19 & 20 Vict. c. xxvi))
Llanelly Railway and Dock Act 1833	3 & 4 Will. 4. c. lii	17 May 1833
An Act to alter amend and enlarge the Powers of an Act passed in the Ninth Year of the Reign of His late Majesty King George the Fourth, (Note: Llanelly Railway and Dock Act 1828 (9 Geo. 4. c. xci)) for making and maintaining a Railway or Tramroad from Gelly Gille Farm in the Parish of Llanelly in the County of Carmarthen to Machynis Pool in the same Parish and County, and for making and maintaining a Wet Dock at the Termination of the said Railway or Tramroad at Machynis Pool aforesaid.
Ockley and Warnham Road Act 1833 (repealed)	3 & 4 Will. 4. c. liii	17 May 1833
An Act for repairing and maintaining the Road from Stone Street Hatch at Ockley in the County of Surrey to Warnham in the County of Sussex. (Repealed by Statute Law (Repeals) Act 2013 (c. 2))
Tunstall and Bosley, and Great Chell and Shelton Roads (Staffordshire, Cheshire) Act 1833	3 & 4 Will. 4. c. liv	17 May 1833
An Act for more effectually repairing the Road from Tunstall in the County of Stafford to Bosley in the County of Chester, and from Great Chell to Shelton in the said County of Stafford, and for making a new Line and Diversion of Road to communicate therewith.
Roads from Gloucester City Act 1833 (repealed)	3 & 4 Will. 4. c. lv	17 May 1833
An Act for more effectually repairing the Roads leading from the City of Gloucester towards the City of Hereford, and also towards Newent and Newnham in the County of Gloucester, Ledbury in the County of Hereford, and Upton-upon-Severn in the County of Worcester. (Repealed by Statute Law (Repeals) Act 2013 (c. 2))
West Auckland and Elishaw Road (Durham, Northumberland) Act 1833	3 & 4 Will. 4. c. lvi	17 May 1833
An Act for more effectually repairing the Road from the North End of the Road, called "The Coal Road," near West Auckland in the County of Durham, to the Elsdon Road near Elishaw in the County of Northumberland.
Manchester and Salter's Brook Roads Amendment Act 1833	3 & 4 Will. 4. c. lvii	17 May 1833
An Act to amend an Act passed in the Seventh Year of the Reign of His late Majesty King George the Fourth, (Note: Manchester and Salters Brook Roads Act 1826 (7 Geo. 4. c. xvi)) for repairing the Roads from Manchester to Salter's Brook, and for making several Roads to communicate therewith; and also for making a certain new Extension or Diversion of the said Roads instead of a certain Extension or Diversion by the said Act authorized to be made.
Roads from Ledbury (Herefordshire, Gloucestershire) Act 1833	3 & 4 Will. 4. c. lviii	17 May 1833
An Act for more effectually repairing the several Roads leading from the Borough of Ledbury, in the County of Hereford, and the Road from the Parish of Bromesberrow to the Road from Gloucester to Worcester, and for making several Roads to communicate therewith.
Hurdsfield and Chapel-en-le-Frith Road (Derbyshire) Act 1833 (repealed)	3 & 4 Will. 4. c. lix	17 May 1833
An Act for more effectually repairing the Road from the Canal Bridge in Hurdsfield in the County of Chester to the Turnpike Road at Randle Carr Lane Head in Fernilee in the County of Derby, leading to Chapel-in-the-Frith in the same County. (Repealed by Macclesfield and Chapel-en-le-Frith Turnpike Road Act 1866 (29 & 30 Vict. c. lxxiv))
Baldock and Bourn Bridge Road Act 1833	3 & 4 Will. 4. c. lx	17 May 1833
An Act for more effectually repairing the Road from the Turnpike Road in Baldock in the County of Hertford to the Turnpike Road at or near Bourn Bridge in the County of Cambridge.
Ross and Abergavenny Road Act 1833	3 & 4 Will. 4. c. lxi	17 May 1833
An Act for repairing and improving the Road between the Towns of Ross and Abergavenny by Broad Oak and Skenfrith, and certain Roads connected therewith, leading to Grosmont and other Places, and for making and maintaining certain Branches of Road to communicate therewith, all in the Counties of Hereford and Monmouth.
York Improvement and Markets Act 1833	3 & 4 Will. 4. c. lxii	10 June 1833
An Act for improving and enlarging the Market Places within the City of York, and rendering the Approaches thereto more commodious; and for regulating and maintaining the several Markets and Fairs held within the same City and the Suburbs thereof; and for amending an Act of His late Majesty, (Note: York Improvement Act 1825 (6 Geo. 4. c. cxxvii)) for paving, lighting, watching, and improving the said City; and other Purposes.
Imperial Continental Gas Association Act 1833 (repealed)	3 & 4 Will. 4. c. lxiii	10 June 1833
An Act for granting certain Powers to a Company called "The Imperial Continental Gas Association." (Repealed by Imperial Continental Gas Association Act 1853 (16 & 17 Vict. c. cxc))
Faculty of Procurators of Glasgow Widows Fund Act 1833 (repealed)	3 & 4 Will. 4. c. lxiv	10 June 1833
An Act for the better establishing and securing a Fund for providing Annuities to the Widows and Children of the Members of the Faculty of Procurators of Glasgow. (Repealed by Statute Law (Repeals) Act 1998 (c. 43))
Edinburgh Life Assurance Company Act 1833 (repealed)	3 & 4 Will. 4. c. lxv	10 June 1833
An Act to enable the Edinburgh Life Assurance Company to sue and be sued in the Name of their Manager, Secretary, or a limited Number of their ordinary Directors, to hold Property, and for other Purposes relating thereto. (Repealed by Edinburgh Life Assurance Company Act 1845 (8 & 9 Vict. c. lxxvi))
Economic Life Assurance Society Act 1833	3 & 4 Will. 4. c. lxvi	10 June 1833
An Act to enable The Economic Life Assurance Society to sue and be sued in the Name of any one of the Directors or Trustees of the said Society.
Rye Harbour Act 1833	3 & 4 Will. 4. c. lxvii	10 June 1833
An Act to alter and amend the Powers of several Acts (Note: Rye Harbour Act 1797 (37 Geo. 3. c. 130)) (Note: Rye Harbour Act 1801 (41 Geo. 3. (U.K.) c. liii)) (Note: Rye Harbour Act 1830 (11 Geo. 4 & 1 Will. 4. c. cxxxv)) passed relating to the Harbour of Rye in the County of Sussex, and for granting further Powers for improving and completing the said Harbour and the Navigation thereof.
Birkenhead Improvement Act 1833 (repealed)	3 & 4 Will. 4. c. lxviii	10 June 1833
An Act for paving, lighting, watching, cleansing, and otherwise improving the Township or Chapelry of Birkenhead in the County Palatine of Chester, and for regulating the Police thereof, and for establishing a Market within the said Township. (Repealed by Birkenhead Corporation Act 1881 (44 & 45 Vict. c. cliii))
Leicester and Swannington Railway Act 1833	3 & 4 Will. 4. c. lxix	10 June 1833
An Act to enable the Company of Proprietors of the Leicester and Swannington Railway to execute additional Works and Branches, and for altering and amending the Powers of the Act (Note: Leicester and Swannington Railway Act 1830 (11 Geo. 4. c. lviii)) relating to the said Railway.
Stratford and Moreton Railway (Shipston-upon-Stour Branch) Act 1833	3 & 4 Will. 4. c. lxx	10 June 1833
An Act for enabling the Stratford and Moreton Railway Company to make a new Branch of Railway to Shipston-upon-Stour in the County of Worcester.
Coleorton Railway Act 1833	3 & 4 Will. 4. c. lxxi	10 June 1833
An Act for making and maintaining a Railway from the Termination of the Leicester and Swannington Railway in the Township of Swannington in the County of Leicester to the Ashby-de-la-Zouch Railway in the Township of Worthington in the said County, and a Branch Railway therefrom.
Fens Drainage Act 1833	3 & 4 Will. 4. c. lxxii	10 June 1833
An Act for altering and amending several Acts passed for the Drainage and Improvement of the Lands lying in the North Level, Part of the Great Level of the Fens called Bedford Level, and in Great Portsand and in the Manor of Crowland; and for providing additional Funds for such Drainage and Improvement by the Nene Outfall Cut to Sea.
Road from Great Faringdon to Burford (Berkshire, Oxfordshire) Act 1833	3 & 4 Will. 4. c. lxxiii	10 June 1833
An Act for repairing the Road from the Town of Great Farringdon in the County of Berks to Burford in the County of Oxford.
Warrington and Wigan Road (Lancashire) Act 1833	3 & 4 Will. 4. c. lxxiv	10 June 1833
An Act for more effectually repairing and otherwise improving the Road from Warrington to Wigan in the County Palatine of Lancaster.
Roads through Huntley from Gloucester Act 1833 (repealed)	3 & 4 Will. 4. c. lxxv	10 June 1833
An Act for repairing and improving the Roads through Huntley from Gloucester towards Ross in the County of Hereford, and to and from Mitcheldean, and through Westbury-upon-Severn to Newnham and Littledean, in the County of Gloucester. (Repealed by Huntley Roads (Gloucestershire, Herefordshire) Act 1866 (29 & 30 Vict. c. c))
Haddon and Bentley (Derbyshire) Road Act 1833 (repealed)	3 & 4 Will. 4. c. lxxvi	10 June 1833
An Act for maintaining and improving the Turnpike Road from the Guide Post below Haddon, out of the Bakewell Turnpike Road, into the Bentley and Ashbourne Turnpike Road, in the County of Derby. (Repealed by Haddon and Bentley Road Act 1865 (28 & 29 Vict. c. ccvii))
Whitchurch (Hampshire) and Aldermaston Road Act 1833	3 & 4 Will. 4. c. lxxvii	10 June 1833
An Act for repairing and widening the Road from Whitchurch in the County of Southampton to the Extremity of the Parish of Aldermaston in the County of Berks.
Roads from Warminster and from Frome and from Woolverton Act 1833 (repealed)	3 & 4 Will. 4. c. lxxviii	10 June 1833
An Act for better repairing the Roads from Warminster and from Frome to the Bath Road, and from Woolverton to the Trowbridge Road, in the Counties of Wilts and Somerset, and for making certain new Lines of Road branching out of such Roads to and towards Bath. (Repealed by Black Dog Road Act 1853 (16 & 17 Vict. c. lxxi))
Road from Axwell Park Gate to Shotley Bridge (Durham) Act 1833 (repealed)	3 & 4 Will. 4. c. lxxix	10 June 1833
An Act to make and maintain a Turnpike Road from the Gateshead and Hexham Turnpike Road at or near to Axwell Park Gate, on the River Derwent, in the Township of Winlaton in the Parish of Ryton in the County of Durham, to the Village of Shotley Bridge in the said County of Durham. (Repealed by Derwent and Shotley Bridge Road Act 1866 (29 & 30 Vict. c. vii))
Brougham and Penrith Road Act 1833	3 & 4 Will. 4. c. lxxx	10 June 1833
An Act for more effectually repairing the Road from the East End of a Close called Lord's Close, in the Parish of Brougham in the County of Westmoreland, by way of Brougham Bridge, into the Town of Penrith in the County of Cumberland.
Storrington and Walberton Road (Sussex) Act 1833	3 & 4 Will. 4. c. lxxxi	10 June 1833
An Act for more effectually repairing the Road from Storrington to Ball's Hut in Walberton in the County of Sussex.
Road from Offham to Ditchling (Sussex) Act 1833	3 & 4 Will. 4. c. lxxxii	10 June 1833
An Act for repairing the Road from Offham to Ditchelling in the County of Sussex.
Tadcaster Bridge and Hob Moor Lane Road Act 1833	3 & 4 Will. 4. c. lxxxiii	10 June 1833
An Act for repairing maintaining and improving the Road from Tadcaster Bridge within the County of the City of York to Hob Moor Lane End.
Rochdale and Edenfield Road Act 1833 (repealed)	3 & 4 Will. 4. c. lxxxiv	10 June 1833
An Act for more effectually repairing and improving the Road from Rochdale to Edenfield in the Parish of Bury, all in the County Palatine of Lancaster. (Repealed by Rochdale and Edenfield Road Act 1866 (29 & 30 Vict. c. lxxix))
New North Road Act 1833 (repealed)	3 & 4 Will. 4. c. lxxxv	10 June 1833
An Act for continuing certain Powers to the Trustees of the New North Road, leading from the South End of Highbury Place, Islington, to Haberdashers Walk in the Parish of Saint Leonard Shoreditch, in the County of Middlesex. (Repealed by New North Road Act 1849 (12 & 13 Vict. c. lxvi))
Aylesbury and Thame Road Act 1833 (repealed)	3 & 4 Will. 4. c. lxxxvi	10 June 1833
An Act for repairing the Road from Aylesbury in the County of Buckingham to Thame in the County of Oxford, and the Roads leading from the Town of Thame to Shillingford, Postcomb and Bicester, in the said County of Oxford. (Repealed by Thame Roads Act 1838 (1 & 2 Vict. c. xlvi))
Rugby Bridge and Hinckley Road Act 1833	3 & 4 Will. 4. c. lxxxvii	10 June 1833
An Act for more effectually repairing the Road from Rugby Bridge in the County of Warwick to the Town of Hinckley in the County of Leicester.
Brimington, Chesterfield and High Moors Roads (Derbyshire) Act 1833 (repealed)	3 & 4 Will. 4. c. lxxxviii	10 June 1833
An Act for more effectually repairing the Roads from Birmington and Chesterfield in the County of Derby to the High Moors in the Parish of Brampton, in the said County. (Repealed by Chesterfield, Dunstone and High Moors Turnpike Act 1865 (28 & 29 Vict. c. ccxv))
Bodmin Roads Act 1833 (repealed)	3 & 4 Will. 4. c. lxxxix	10 June 1833
An Act for amending an Act of His late Majesty King George the Fourth, (Note: Bodmin Roads Act 1829 (10 Geo. 4. c. xix)) for more effectually making and repairing certain Roads leading to and from Bodmin, and other Roads therein mentioned, in the County of Cornwall; and for making and maintaining a new Road communicating therewith. (Repealed by Bodmin Roads Act 1835 (5 & 6 Will. 4. c. cv))
Cheltenham and Gloucester Road Act 1833	3 & 4 Will. 4. c. xc	10 June 1833
An Act to amend so much of Two Acts (Note: Road from Cheltenham to Gloucester Act 1825 (6 Geo. 4. c. cxlvii)) (Note: Cheltenham and Gloucester Road Act 1828 (9 Geo. 4. c. ix)) for repairing the Road leading from Cheltenham towards the City of Gloucester, and for making a new Branch to communicate with the same, as relates to the Priority of certain Mortgages granted on the Tolls thereof.
Fyfield and St. John's Bridge, and Kingston Bagpuize and Newbridge Roads Act 1833	3 & 4 Will. 4. c. xci	10 June 1833
An Act for repairing the Roads from Fyfield in the County of Berks to Saint John's Bridge in the County of Gloucester, and from Kingston Bagpuze to Newbridge in the said County of Berks.
Swindon, Calne and Cricklade Roads Act 1833 (repealed)	3 & 4 Will. 4. c. xcii	10 June 1833
An Act for more effectually repairing the Roads leading from Swindon to the Centre of Christian Malford Bridge, from Calne to Lyneham Green, and from the Direction Post in Long Leaze Lane, near Lydiard Marsh to Cricklade, in the County of Wilts. (Repealed by Swindon, Calne and Cricklade Turnpike Roads Act 1866 (29 & 30 Vict. c. cxviii))
Kingston-upon-Hull and Beverley, and Newland Bridge and Cottingham Roads (Yorkshire, East Riding) Act 1833	3 & 4 Will. 4. c. xciii	10 June 1833
An Act for maintaining the Roads from the Town of Kingston-upon-Hull to the Town of Beverley in the East Riding of the County of York, and from Newland Bridge to the West End of the Town of Gottingham in the same Riding.
Chepstow and Abergavenny Road Act 1833	3 & 4 Will. 4. c. xciv	10 June 1833
An Act for improving the Communication between the Towns of Chepstow and Abergavenny in the County of Monmouth.
Clarence Railway (No. 2) Act 1833	3 & 4 Will. 4. c. xcv	18 June 1833
An Act to enable the Clarence Railway Company to make an Extension of the Line of their Railway.
Wiggenhall St. Mary Magdalen Drainage Act 1833	3 & 4 Will. 4. c. xcvi	18 June 1833
An Act for draining and preserving certain Fen Lands and Low Grounds in the Parish of Wiggenhall Saint Mary Magdalen in the County of Norfolk, and other Purposes.
Butterton Moor End and Buxton and Ashbourne Turnpike Road Act 1833 (repealed)	3 & 4 Will. 4. c. xcvii	18 June 1833
An Act for more effectually repairing and improving the Road from Butterton Moor End to the Turnpike Road leading from Buxton to Ashborne, and other Roads therein mentioned, in the Counties of Stafford and Derby, and for making several Diversions or new Lines of Road to communicate therewith. (Repealed by Butterton Moor End Turnpike Roads Act 1866 (29 & 30 Vict. c. xxii))
Roads from Bury St. Edmunds to Newmarket and to Brandon Act 1833 (repealed)	3 & 4 Will. 4. c. xcviii	18 June 1833
An Act for more effectually repairing the Road from Bury Saint Edmunds to Newmarket in the Counties of Suffolk and Cambridge. (Repealed by Statute Law (Repeals) Act 2008 (c. 12))
Watling Street (Shrewsbury and Wellington Districts) Act 1833 (repealed)	3 & 4 Will. 4. c. xcix	18 June 1833
An Act for improving the Shrewsbury District and the Wellington District of the Watling Street Road in the County of Salop. (Repealed by Statute Law (Repeals) Act 2013 (c. 2))
Kentish Town and Upper Holloway Road Act 1833	3 & 4 Will. 4. c. c	28 June 1833
An Act for continuing certain Powers to the Trustees of the Road from Kentish Town to Upper Holloway in the County of Middlesex.
Gravesend Quay Act 1833	3 & 4 Will. 4. c. ci	28 June 1833
An Act for amending an Act passed in the Ninth Year of the Reign of His late Majesty King George the Fourth, intituled "An Act for rebuilding, or for improving, regulating, and maintaining, the Town Quay of Gravesend in the County of Kent, and the Landing Place belonging thereto;" (Note: Gravesend Town Quay Act 1828 (9 Geo. 4. c. lvi)) and for building a Pier or Jetty adjoining thereto.
Haverfordwest Bridge over River Dungleddau Act 1833 (repealed)	3 & 4 Will. 4. c. cii	28 June 1833
An Act for erecting a Bridge over the River Dungleddan within the Town and County of Haverfordwest and the Liberties thereof. (Repealed by Dyfed Act 1987 (c. xxiv))
Haverfordwest Water Act 1833	3 & 4 Will. 4. c. ciii	28 June 1833
An Act for supplying with Water the Town and County of Haverfordwest and the Liberties thereof.
Lewes Water Act 1833 (repealed)	3 & 4 Will. 4. c. civ	28 June 1833
An Act for better supplying with Water the Town and Borough of Lewes, and the Neighbourhood thereof, in the County of Sussex. (Repealed by Lewes Waterworks Act 1868 (31 & 32 Vict. c. xiii))
Herne Parish Improvement Act 1833 (repealed)	3 & 4 Will. 4. c. cv	28 June 1833
An Act for paving, cleansing, lighting, watching, repairing, and improving a certain Portion of the Parish of Herne in the County of Kent. (Repealed by Local Government Board's Provisional Orders Confirmation (Eastbourne, &c.) Act 1880 (43 & 44 Vict. c. cxxxii))
Edinburgh Improvement Act 1833	3 & 4 Will. 4. c. cvi	28 June 1833
An Act to explain and amend an Act passed in the First and Second Year of the Reign of His present Majesty, (Note: Edinburgh Improvement Act 1831 (1 & 2 Will. 4. c. xlv)) intituled "An Act to alter and amend an Act passed in the Seventh and Eighth Year of the Reign of His late Majesty, (Note: Edinburgh Improvement Act 1827 (7 & 8 Geo. 4. c. lxxvi)) intituled 'An Act for carrying into effect certain Improvements within the City of Edinburgh and adjacent to the same.'"
Forehoe Poor Relief Act 1833 (repealed)	3 & 4 Will. 4. c. cvii	28 June 1833
An Act for amending several Acts of the Sixteenth, (Note: Forehoe Poor Relief Act 1776 (16 Geo. 3. c. 9)) Twenty-third, (Note: Forehoe, Norfolk (Borrowing Powers of Guardians) Act 1783 (23 Geo. 3. c. 29)) Twenty-ninth, (Note: Forehoe, Norfolk (Guardians' Borrowing Powers) Act 1789 (29 Geo. 3. c. 4)) and Fifty-fourth (Note: Forehoe Poor Relief Act 1814 (54 Geo. 3. c. xliv)) Years of His late Majesty King George the Third, for the better Relief and Employment of the Poor within the Hundred of Forehoe in the County of Norfolk. (Repealed by Statute Law (Repeals) Act 2013 (c. 2))
Lanark and Hamilton Gaol, Court Houses and Public Offices Act 1833	3 & 4 Will. 4. c. cviii	28 June 1833
An Act for erecting and maintaining a Gaol, Court Houses, and Public Offices for the Burgh of Lanark and the Upper Ward of the County of Lanark; and also for erecting and maintaining a Gaol, Court Houses, and Public Offices for the Burgh of Hamilton and Middle Ward of the said County.
Haddingtonshire Roads Act 1833 (repealed)	3 & 4 Will. 4. c. cix	28 June 1833
An Act for repairing, amending, and maintaining the Turnpike Roads in the County of Haddington, for rendering Turnpike certain Statute Labour and Parish Roads, and for more effectually collecting and applying the Statute Labour in the said County. (Repealed by Haddingtonshire Roads Act 1863 (26 & 27 Vict. c. ccxv))
Bishop of Ely's Estate and Estate of the Society of Judges and Serjeants at Law Act 1833	3 & 4 Will. 4. c. cx	9 July 1833
An Act for confirming and carrying into effect Agreements between the Bishop of Ely and the Society of Judges and Serjeants at Law, for vesting in the said Society the Fee Simple of Serjeants Inn, Chancery Lane, and between the Parish of Saint Dunstan in the West and the said Society; and for other Purposes.
Ancholme Drainage Act 1833	3 & 4 Will. 4. c. cxi	9 July 1833
An Act to alter and amend Three several Acts made in the Seventh (Note: River Ancholme Navigation and Drainage Act 1766 (7 Geo. 3. c. 98)) and Forty-second (Note: River Ancholme Drainage and Navigation Act 1802 (42 Geo. 3. c. cxvi)) Years of the Reign of King George the Third and the Sixth Year of the Reign of His late Majesty King George the Fourth, (Note: Ancholme Drainage and Navigation Act 1825 (6 Geo. 4. c. clxv)) for draining Lands within the Level of Ancholme in the County of Lincoln, and making certain Parts of the River Ancholme navigable.
Carlow, Kilkenny and Tipperary Roads Act 1833 (repealed)	3 & 4 Will. 4. c. cxii	9 July 1833
An Act for more effectually repairing several Roads in the Counties of Carlow, Kilkenny, and Tipperary, and also the Road from the Town of Clonmel, through the County of Waterford, to the Cross Roads of Knocklofty, in the said County of Tipperary. (Repealed by Turnpike Trusts Abolition (Ireland) Act 1857 (20 & 21 Vict. c. 16))
Maryport Harbour and Improvement Act 1833 (repealed)	3 & 4 Will. 4. c. cxiii	24 July 1833
An Act for better preserving the Harbour of Maryport, and for lighting and otherwise improving the Township of Maryport in the County of Cumberland. (Repealed by Maryport Improvement and Harbour Act 1866 (29 & 30 Vict. c. ccxlv))
Monkland and Kirkintilloch Railway Act 1833	3 & 4 Will. 4. c. cxiv	24 July 1833
An Act for making Two Branch Railways from the Monkland and Kirkintilloch Railway; and for altering, amending, and enlarging the Powers of an Act of the Fifth Year of His late Majesty (Note: Monkland and Kirkintilloch Railway Act 1824 (5 Geo. 4. c. xlix)) for making the said Railway.
City of Dublin Steam Packet Company Act 1833 (repealed)	3 & 4 Will. 4. c. cxv	24 July 1833
An Act to amend an Act passed in the Ninth Year of the Reign of His late Majesty, (Note: City of Dublin Steam Packet Company Act 1828 (9 Geo. 4. c. lxvi)) for regulating and enabling the City of Dublin Steam Packet Company to sue and be sued. (Repealed by Statute Law (Repeals) Act 2013 (c. 2))
Greenock and Renfrew, and Greenock and Kelly Bridge Roads Act 1833	3 & 4 Will. 4. c. cxvi	24 July 1833
An Act for renewing and extending the Terms of the Acts relating to the Greenock and Renfrew and Greenock and Kelly Bridge Roads in the County of Renfrew.
Troopers Fund (or St. George's Fund Society) Act 1833 (repealed)	3 & 4 Will. 4. c. cxvii	14 August 1833
An Act for dissolving "The Saint George's Fund Society," otherwise called "The Troopers Fund," in the Royal Regiment of Horse Guards, and for distributing the Fund. (Repealed by Statute Law (Repeals) Act 2013 (c. 2))
Blackfriars Bridge Act 1833	3 & 4 Will. 4. c. cxviii	14 August 1833
An Act for raising a Sum of Money for the Repair of Blackfriars Bridge.
Hyde Court of Requests Act 1833 (repealed)	3 & 4 Will. 4. c. cxix	14 August 1833
An Act for the more easy and speedy Recovery of Small Debts within the Township of Hyde, and other Places therein mentioned, in the County Palatine of Chester. (Repealed by County Courts Act 1846 (9 & 10 Vict. c. 95))
Hurdsfield and Chapel-en-le-Frith Road (No. 2) Act 1833 (repealed)	3 & 4 Will. 4. c. cxx	14 August 1833
An Act to rectify a Mistake in an Act of this Session of Parliament, (Note: Hurdsfield and Chapel-en-le-Frith Road (Derbyshire) Act 1833 (3 & 4 Will. 4. c. lix)) for more effectually repairing the Road from the Canal Bridge in Hurdsfield in the County of Chester to the Turnpike Road at Randle Carr Lane Head in Fernilee in the County of Derby, leading to Chapel in the Frith in the same County. (Repealed by Macclesfield and Chapel-en-le-Frith Turnpike Road Act 1866 (29 & 30 Vict. c. lxxiv))
Thames Tunnel Company Act 1833	3 & 4 Will. 4. c. cxxi	28 August 1833
An Act to amend the Acts (Note: Thames Tunnel Act 1824 (5 Geo. 4. c. clvi)) (Note: Thames Tunnel Company Act 1828 (9 Geo. 4. c. lxiii)) relating to the Thames Tunnel Company, and to extend the Powers thereby given for raising Money for the Completion of the said Tunnel.
City of Edinburgh Creditors Act 1833 (repealed)	3 & 4 Will. 4. c. cxxii	29 August 1833
An Act to appoint Trustees for the Creditors of the City of Edinburgh. (Repealed by Debt of City of Edinburgh, etc. Act, 1838 (1 & 2 Vict. c. 55))

=== Private acts ===
Short title	Citation	Royal assent
Long title
Hanging Langford Inclosure Act 1833	3 & 4 Will. 4. c. 1 Pr.	29 March 1833
An Act for dividing, allotting, and inclosing Lands in the Tithing of Hanging Langford, within the Parish of Steeple Langford in the County of Wilts.
Crakehall Inclosure Act 1833	3 & 4 Will. 4. c. 2 Pr.	29 March 1833
An Act for inclosing Lands in the Township of Crakehall in the Parish of Bedale in the North Riding of the County of York.
Englefield's Estate Act 1833	3 & 4 Will. 4. c. 3 Pr.	20 April 1833
An Act for enabling the Trustees of the Will of the late Sir Henry Charles Englefield Baronet, deceased, to sell the undivided Moiety of the Estate called the Wharram Percy Estate, in the County of York, thereby devised.
Sir John Soane's Museum Act 1833	3 & 4 Will. 4. c. 4 Pr.	20 April 1833
An Act for settling and preserving Sir John Soane's Museum, Library, and Works of Art, in Lincoln's Inn Fields in the County of Middlesex, for the Benefit of the Public, and for establishing a sufficient Endowment for the due Maintenance of the same.
Corpus Christi College and Pembroke Hall, Cambridge Act 1833	3 & 4 Will. 4. c. 5 Pr.	10 June 1833
An Act for effecting an Exchange between the Master or Keeper and Fellows or Scholars of Corpus Christi College in the University of Cambridge, and the Master or Keeper, Fellows and Scholars of Pembroke Hall in the same University.
Hamilton's Estate Act 1833	3 & 4 Will. 4. c. 6 Pr.	10 June 1833
An Act for vesting and securing the Lands of Muirhouse in the County of Lanark in General John Hamilton of Dalzell, and the Heirs under a Deed of Entail of the said Estate of Dalzell in said County, made by James Hamilton Esquire, of Rosehall, under the Conditions and Limitations therein contained; and for disentailing, in lieu thereof, certain detached Parts of the said Entailed Estate; and also for vesting other Parts of the said Entailed Estate in a Trustee, to sell the same, and apply the Price thereof, or the Securities to be granted thereon, for Payment of Debts contracted by the said General John Hamilton for Money laid out in the Improvement of the said Entailed Estate.
Morris's Estate Act 1833	3 & 4 Will. 4. c. 7 Pr.	10 June 1833
An Act to enable the Reverend Richard Morris and Mary Ann his Wife, during their joint Lives, and the said Mary Ann Morris in case she shall survive the said Richard Morris, and after her Decease the Guardians of Martha Sophia Hogg Spinster, during her Infancy, to grant Leases of Part of the Estates devised by the Will of James Hogg deceased, for the Purpose of building upon and otherwise improving the same.
Estates of the Reverend Vincent and Jane Edwards and the devisees of Richard Edwards: vesting certain estates in trustees for sale, other estates to be purchased and settled in lieu.	3 & 4 Will. 4. c. 8 Pr.	10 June 1833
An Act for vesting the undivided Moieties of certain Estates of the Reverend Vincent Edwards and Jane his Wife, and their Issue, and of the Devisees of Richard Edwards deceased, in Trustees, for Sale, and for laying out the Monies to be produced by such Sale in the Purchase of other Estates, to be settled to the same Uses.
Wisbech St. Mary (Cambridgeshire) Inclosure Act 1833	3 & 4 Will. 4. c. 9 Pr.	10 June 1833
An Act for inclosing, dividing, and allotting the Commons, Droves, and Waste Lands in the Parish of Wisbech Saint Mary's in the Isle of Ely in the County of Cambridge.
Middleton by Winksworth Inclosure Act 1833	3 & 4 Will. 4. c. 10 Pr.	10 June 1833
An Act for dividing, allotting, and inclosing Lands in the Township of Middleton by Wirksworth in the County of Derby.
Ganerew Inclosure Act 1833	3 & 4 Will. 4. c. 11 Pr.	10 June 1833
An Act for inclosing Lands in the Parish of Ganerew in the County of Hereford.
Elkstone Inclosure Act 1833	3 & 4 Will. 4. c. 12 Pr.	10 June 1833
An Act for inclosing Lands in the Parish of Elkstone in the County of Gloucester.
West Moor, East Moor and Middle Moor (Somerset) Inclosure Act 1833	3 & 4 Will. 4. c. 13 Pr.	10 June 1833
An Act for inclosing certain Moors or Commons called West Moor, East Moor, and Middle Moor, in the County of Somerset.
Great Givendale Inclosure Act 1833	3 & 4 Will. 4. c. 14 Pr.	10 June 1833
An Act for inclosing Lands in the Township of Great Givendale in the East Riding of the County of York.
Oakington Inclosure Act 1833	3 & 4 Will. 4. c. 15 Pr.	10 June 1833
An Act for inclosing Lands in the Parish of Oakington in the County of Cambridge, and for commuting the Tithes of the said Parish.
Lakenheath Inclosure Act 1833	3 & 4 Will. 4. c. 16 Pr.	10 June 1833
An Act for inclosing Lands within the Parish of Lakenheath in the County of Suffolk.
Yardley Inclosure Act 1833	3 & 4 Will. 4. c. 17 Pr.	10 June 1833
An Act for inclosing Lands in the Parish of Yardley in the County of Worcester, and for commuting the Tithes of the said Parish.
Murton's Estate Act 1833	3 & 4 Will. 4. c. 18 Pr.	18 June 1833
An Act for confirming a Partition of Farms and Lands in the County of Kent, devised by the Will of William Murton, late of Tunstall in the same County, deceased.
Vere's and Robinson's Estates Act 1833	3 & 4 Will. 4. c. 19 Pr.	18 June 1833
An Act for effecting an Exchange of Estates in the County of Lincoln between Elizabeth Vere Widow and James Vere Esquire and William Robinson.
Little Salkeld Inclosure Act 1833	3 & 4 Will. 4. c. 20 Pr.	18 June 1833
An Act for inclosing Lands within the Manor of Little Salkeld in the Parish of Addingham in the County of Cumberland.
Leeds Oil Gaslight Company (Dissolution) Act 1833	3 & 4 Will. 4. c. 21 Pr.	28 June 1833
An Act for dissolving the Corporation of The Leeds Oil Gas Light Company, and for vesting the Estate and Effects of the Company in Trustees, to be sold for the Benefit of the Parties interested therein; and for finally settling and adjusting the Company's Concerns.
Charles Petley's and Others' Estates Act 1833	3 & 4 Will. 4. c. 22 Pr.	28 June 1833
An Act for enabling Charles Robert Carter Petley Esquire and others to grant Building and Repairing Leases of Lands and Premises in the Parishes of Saint Dunstan Stebonheath otherwise Stepney and Saint Matthew Bethnal Green in the County of Middlesex.
Stockton Blue Coat School's Estate Act 1833	3 & 4 Will. 4. c. 23 Pr.	28 June 1833
An Act to enable the Trustees of the Blue Coat Charity School at Stockton in the County of Durham to sell and dispose of certain Lands and Hereditaments belonging to the said Charity, and to purchase and acquire other Lands in lieu thereof, and also the Reversion of the Lands held by them for Lives.
Ann Thorneycroft's Estate Act 1833	3 & 4 Will. 4. c. 24 Pr.	28 June 1833
An Act for vesting certain Estates of which Ann Thornycroft Spinster was Mortgagee in Fee in the Reverend Robert Clowes Clerk, the surviving Executor of her Will, subject to the subsisting Equities of Redemption.
Loughor Inclosure Act 1833	3 & 4 Will. 4. c. 25 Pr.	28 June 1833
An Act for dividing, allotting, and inclosing the Commonable and Waste Lands in the Borough of Loughor in the Manor of Loughor in the County of Glamorgan.
Viscount Fitzwilliam's Estate Act 1833	3 & 4 Will. 4. c. 26 Pr.	9 July 1833
An Act to grant further Power to lease certain Parts of the Devised Estates of the Right Honourable Richard late Viscount Fitzwilliam deceased, situate in the City of Dublin and the Neighbourhood thereof.
Thellusson's Estate Act 1833	3 & 4 Will. 4. c. 27 Pr.	14 August 1833
An Act for enabling and directing the Trustees acting under the Will of Peter Thellusson Esquire, deceased, to grant certain Leases of the Estates subject to the Trusts of the said Will; and for other Purposes.
Maurice's Estate Act 1833	3 & 4 Will. 4. c. 28 Pr.	14 August 1833
An Act to vest Part of the Estates devised by the Will of the Reverend Robert Maurice, late of Blandford Forum in the County of Dorset, Clerk, deceased, in Trustees, for Sale; and for investing the Monies to arise from such Sale in the Purchase of other Estates, to be settled to the subsisting Uses of the said Will.
St. George's Chapel, Limerick Act 1833	3 & 4 Will. 4. c. 29 Pr.	14 August 1833
An Act to enable the Lord Bishop of Limerick to sell and dispose of Saint George's Chapel in the City of Limerick, and the Land on which the same is built (heretofore Part of the Estate of the Earl of Limerick), and to apply the Proceeds of such Sale in the Erection of a new Chapel.
Cruikshank's Estate Act 1833	3 & 4 Will. 4. c. 30 Pr.	28 August 1833
An Act to invest Parts of the Entailed Estate of Langley Park in the County of Forfar, belonging to James Cruikshank Esquire, in Trustees, in Fee Simple, for the Purpose of selling the Lands so vested, and applying the Price thereof, or the Loans to be raised on Securities to be granted thereon and on the said Entailed Estate, towards Extinction of Debts affecting or that may be made to affect the Fee of the said Estate.
Anichini's Naturalization Act 1833 (Note: This act was not printed by the King's Printer)	3 & 4 Will. 4. c. 31 Pr.	29 March 1833
An Act for naturalizing Pompey Anichini.
Schuster's Naturalization Act 1833	3 & 4 Will. 4. c. 32 Pr.	29 March 1833
An Act for naturalizing Leo Schuster.
Lindon's Naturalization Act 1833	3 & 4 Will. 4. c. 33 Pr.	29 March 1833
An Act for naturalizing William Lindon.
Behrends' Naturalization Act 1833	3 & 4 Will. 4. c. 34 Pr.	29 March 1833
An Act for naturalizing John George Behrends.
Pein's Naturalization Act 1833	3 & 4 Will. 4. c. 35 Pr.	20 April 1833
An Act for naturalizing Edward Pein.
De Arroyave's Naturalization Act 1833	3 & 4 Will. 4. c. 36 Pr.	20 April 1833
An Act for naturalizing Anselmo de Arroyave.
Sturcke's Naturalization Act 1833	3 & 4 Will. 4. c. 37 Pr.	20 April 1833
An Act for naturalizing Claus Sturcke.
Mathiessen's Naturalization Act 1833	3 & 4 Will. 4. c. 38 Pr.	6 May 1833
An Act for naturalizing William Matthiessen.
Wortley Inclosure Act 1833	3 & 4 Will. 4. c. 39 Pr.	17 May 1833
An Act for inclosing Lands in the Township of Wortley in the Parish of Leeds in the West Riding of the County of York.
Bepton Inclosure Act 1833	3 & 4 Will. 4. c. 40 Pr.	10 June 1833
An Act for inclosing Lands in the Parish of Bepton in the County of Sussex.
Leisler's Naturalization Act 1833	3 & 4 Will. 4. c. 41 Pr.	10 June 1833
An Act for naturalizing John Leisler.
Lemmé's Naturalization Act 1833	3 & 4 Will. 4. c. 42 Pr.	28 June 1833
An Act for naturalizing John Louis Lemmé.
Willis's Divorce Act 1833	3 & 4 Will. 4. c. 43 Pr.	24 July 1833
An Act to dissolve the Marriage of John Walpole Willis Esquire with the Right Honourable Lady Mary Isabelle his now Wife, and to enable him to marry again; and for other Purposes therein mentioned.

=== Sources ===
- 3 & 4 William IV - 1833. 1833 – via Internet Archive.
- A Collection of the Public General Statutes passed in the Third and Fourth Year of the Reign of His Majesty King William the Fourth, 1833. London: Eyre and Spottiswoode. 1833 – via Google Books.
- Simons, N., ed. (1835). The Statutes of the United Kingdom of Great Britain and Ireland. Vol. 13: From A.D. 1833, 3 & 4 Will. IV—To A.D. 1835, 5 & 6 Will. IV. Both inclusive. London: Eyre and Spottiswoode – via Google Books.
- Journal of the House of Commons. Vol. 88. London: His Majesty's Stationery Office. 1833. pp. 3–735 – via Internet Archive.

== See also ==
- List of acts of the Parliament of the United Kingdom
