= Aberdeen Independent =

Former Aberdonian Newspaper

The Aberdeen Independent was a free newspaper delivered to houses in the Aberdeen area from 1996 to 2008. Despite the name, it was not connected to the nationally available Independent.

The newspaper was founded in 1996 by Bill Alder. The paper published for 12 years and was named best free newspaper eight times by the Scottish Newspaper Society. The newspaper closed in June 2008, leaving the Aberdeen Citizen as the city's only free newspaper.
