= Police burgh =

Scottish burgh governed by a "police system"

A police burgh was a Scottish burgh which had adopted a "police system" for governing the town. They existed from 1833 to 1975.

== The 1833 act ==
Burgh Police (Scotland) Act 1833
- Act of Parliament
- Parliament of the United Kingdom
- Long title: An Act to enable Burghs in Scotland to establish a general System of Police.
- Citation: 3 & 4 Will. 4. c. 46
- Territorial extent: United Kingdom

Dates
- Royal assent: 14 August 1833
- Commencement: 14 August 1833 (Note: Section 1.)
- Repealed: 15 May 1893
Other legislation
Amended by	Police (Scotland) Act 1850; Statute Law Revision Act 1890
Repealed by	Burgh Police (Scotland) Act 1892
Relates to	Police (Scotland) Act 1857

Status: Repealed

Text of statute as originally enacted

The first police burghs were created under the Burgh Police (Scotland) Act 1833 (3 & 4 Will. 4. c. 46). This act enabled existing royal burghs, burghs of regality, and burghs of barony to adopt powers of paving, lighting, cleansing, watching, supplying with water and improving their communities.

This preceded the Municipal Corporations Act 1835 (5 & 6 Will. 4. c. 76), which introduced a similar reform in England and Wales, by two years.

=== Forming a police burgh ===
In order for the act to be adopted in any burgh, an application by householders in the town had to be made for a poll to be held. If three-quarters of qualified voters were in favour, the act would come into force in the burgh. Inhabitants were also free to choose which parts of the act to adopt.

=== Boundaries ===
Boundaries for the police burgh were to be set out, which could be extended up to 1,000 yards (910 m) in any direction from the limits of the existing burgh. Contiguous burghs were allowed to unite for police burgh purposes. The boundaries agreed were recorded in the sheriff court books for the county.

=== Commissioners ===
A body of elected police commissioners was to administer the police burgh, between five and twenty-one in number. The chief magistrate of the existing burgh was to be, ex officio, a commissioner. Commissioners were to be elected annually.

=== Powers and duties ===
The commissioners could, on applying the relevant sections of the act, collect and apply sums of money for the purposes of:

- employing collectors, clerks, constables, surveyors, police officers, watchmen, etc.
- purchasing lands
- lighting streets by gas or other means
- paving and cleansing streets
- distributing water and gas
- preventing infectious diseases

== Parliamentary burghs ==
Parliamentary Burghs (Scotland) Act 1833 (Note: The citation of this act by this short title was authorised by section 1 of, and the first schedule to, the Short Titles Act 1896. Due to the repeal of those provisions it is now authorised by section 19(2) of the Interpretation Act 1978.)
- Act of Parliament
- Parliament of the United Kingdom
- Long title: An Act to provide for the Appointment and Election of Magistrates and Councillors for the several Burghs and Towns of Scotland which now return or contribute to return Members to Parliament and are not Royal Burghs.
- Citation: 3 & 4 Will. 4. c. 77
- Territorial extent: United Kingdom

Dates
- Royal assent: 28 August 1833
- Commencement: 5 November 1833 (Note: Section 1. The first Tuesday of November next.)
- Repealed: 1 January 1901
Other legislation
Amended by	Burgh Police, etc. (Scotland) Act 1847
Repealed by	Town Councils (Scotland) Act 1900
Relates to	Representation of the People (Scotland) Act 1832

Status: Repealed

Text of statute as originally enacted

A further act was passed, Parliamentary Burghs (Scotland) Act 1833 (3 & 4 Will. 4. c. 77) later in 1833 to extend local government to the thirteen burghs newly enfranchised by the Reform Act 1832 (2 & 3 Will. 4. c. 45). The inhabitants were permitted to elect magistrates and councillors and adopt a “general system of police”. The burghs thus created municipalities were:

Burgh	County
Airdrie	Lanarkshire
Cromarty	Cromartyshire
Falkirk	Stirlingshire
Greenock	Renfrewshire
Hamilton	Lanarkshire
Kilmarnock	Ayrshire
Leith	Midlothian
Musselburgh	Midlothian
Oban	Argyllshire
Paisley	Renfrewshire
Peterhead	Aberdeenshire
Portobello	Midlothian
Port Glasgow	Renfrewshire

50

== Changes in legislation ==
Burgh Police, etc. (Scotland) Act 1847
- Act of Parliament
- Parliament of the United Kingdom
- Long title: An Act to amend an Act to enable Burghs in Scotland to establish a general System of Police, and another Act for providing for the Appointment and Election of Magistrates and Councillors for certain Burghs and Towns of Scotland.
- Citation: 10 & 11 Vict. c. 39
- Territorial extent: United Kingdom

Dates
- Royal assent: 21 June 1847
- Commencement: 15 November 1847
- Repealed: 15 May 1893
Other legislation
Amends	Burgh Police (Scotland) Act 1833; Parliamentary Burghs (Scotland) Act 1833
Amended by	Police (Scotland) Act 1850; Statute Law Revision Act 1875
Repealed by	Burgh Police (Scotland) Act 1892

Status: Repealed

Text of statute as originally enacted

The Burgh Police, etc. (Scotland) Act 1847 (10 & 11 Vict. c. 39) – also known as the General Police (Scotland) Act 1847 – reduced the majority of householders required to adopt the police system from three quarters to two thirds. It also allowed the parliamentary burghs to adopt the burgh police act, and to levy for money to carry out municipal government.

Police (Scotland) Act 1850
- Act of Parliament
- Parliament of the United Kingdom
- Long title: An Act to make more effectual Prevision for regulating the Police of Towns and populous Places in Scotland and for paving, draining, cleansing, lighting, and improving the same.
- Citation: 13 & 14 Vict. c. 33
- Territorial extent: United Kingdom

Dates
- Royal assent: 15 July 1850
- Commencement: 15 July 1850 (Note: The Acts of Parliament (Commencement) Act 1793.)
- Repealed: 15 May 1893
Other legislation
Amends	Burgh Police (Scotland) Act 1833; Burgh Police, etc. (Scotland) Act 1847
Amended by	Dundee Police and Improvement Consolidation Act 1882
Repealed by	Burgh Police (Scotland) Act 1892
Relates to	Glasgow Police Act 1800

Status: Repealed

Text of statute as originally enacted

The Police (Scotland) Act 1850 (13 & 14 Vict. c. 33) – also known as the Police of Towns (Scotland) Act 1850 or Lock's Act – repealed much of the earlier legislation. It also made it easier for police burghs to be created. Any "populous place" was now allowed to adopt a police system and become a burgh. A populous place was defined as any town, village, place or locality not already a burgh and with a population of 1,200 inhabitants or upwards. At the same time, a poll in favour of adopting the act now needed only a simple majority.

General Police and Improvement (Scotland) Act 1862 (Note: Section 2.)
- Act of Parliament
- Parliament of the United Kingdom
- Long title: An Act to make more effectual Provision for regulating the Police of Towns and populous Places in Scotland, and for lighting, cleansing, paving, draining, supplying Water to and improving the same, and also for promoting the Public Health thereof.
- Citation: 25 & 26 Vict. c. 101
- Territorial extent: United Kingdom

Dates
- Royal assent: 7 August 1862
- Commencement: 7 August 1862
- Repealed: 23 July 1866
Other legislation
Amended by	Public Health (Scotland) Act 1867; Statute Law Revision Act 1875; Dundee Police and Improvement Consolidation Act 1882
Repealed by	Glasgow Police Act 1866
Relates to	Glasgow Police Act 1800

Status: Repealed

Text of statute as originally enacted

The General Police and Improvement (Scotland) Act 1862 (25 & 26 Vict. c. 101) set out again the powers of police burghs. It also introduced a system by which commissioners of burghs could apply to the county sheriff for an extension of the burgh boundaries.

Burgh Police (Scotland) Act 1892
- Act of Parliament
- Parliament of the United Kingdom
- Long title: An Act for regulating the Police and Sanitary Administration of towns and populous places, and for facilitating the union of Police and Municipal Administration in burghs in Scotland.
- Citation: 55 & 56 Vict. c. 55
- Territorial extent: United Kingdom

Dates
- Royal assent: 28 June 1892
- Commencement: 15 May 1893
- Repealed: 31 December 1982
Other legislation
Repeals/revokes	Burgh Police (Scotland) Act 1833; Burgh Police, etc. (Scotland) Act 1847; Police (Scotland) Act 1850
Amended by	Burgh Police (Scotland) Act 1893; Burgh Police (Scotland) Act 1892 Amendment Act 1894; Town Councils (Scotland) Act 1900; Licensing (Scotland) Act 1903; Burgh Police (Scotland) Act 1903; Dogs Act 1906; Special Constables Act 1923; Food and Drugs (Adulteration) Act 1928; Administration of Justice (Scotland) Act 1933; Local Government (Scotland) Act 1947; Criminal Justice Act 1948; Gas Act 1948; Statute Law Revision Act 1950; Rivers (Prevention of Pollution) (Scotland) Act 1951; Police (Scotland) Act 1956; Clean Air Act 1956; Local Government (Scotland) Act 1966; Sewerage (Scotland) Act 1968; Consumer Credit Act 1974; Indecent Displays (Control) Act 1981; Forgery and Counterfeiting Act 1981
Repealed by	Local Government (Scotland) Act 1973; Local Government (Scotland) Act 1978

Status: Repealed

Text of statute as originally enacted

Burgh Police (Scotland) Act 1892 Amendment Act 1894
- Act of Parliament
- Parliament of the United Kingdom
- Long title: An Act to amend the Burgh Police (Scotland) Act, 1892.
- Citation: 57 & 58 Vict. c. 18
- Territorial extent: United Kingdom

Dates
- Royal assent: 20 July 1894
- Commencement: 20 July 1894
- Repealed: 1 January 1901
Other legislation
Amends	Burgh Police (Scotland) Act 1892
Repealed by	Town Councils (Scotland) Act 1900

Status: Repealed

Text of statute as originally enacted

The Burgh Police (Scotland) Act 1892 (55 & 56 Vict. c. 55), which came into effect on 15 May 1893, superseded all earlier general and police acts in burghs. Each burgh was now united as a single body corporate for police and municipal purposes – in some cases, a previous royal burgh or burgh of barony or regality had continued to exist alongside the police burgh. Any remaining burghs of barony or regality that had not adopted the police acts were implicitly dissolved. Populous places that could become a burgh were now to have a population of 2,000 or more – though where a place with a lower population resolved to adopt the act, it was at the county sheriff’s discretion to allow or refuse such an application. Police commissioners were now to be retitled councillors, headed by a magistrate under whatever title was customary in the burgh.

The Town Councils (Scotland) Act 1900 (63 & 64 Vict. c. 49) retitled the governing body of a burgh as "the provost, magistrates, and councillors" of the burgh. In certain burghs the title lord provost was to be continued.

Burgh Police (Scotland) Act 1903
- Act of Parliament
- Parliament of the United Kingdom
- Long title: An Act to amend the Law relating to the Administration of Burghs in Scotland.
- Citation: 3 Edw. 7. c. 33
- Territorial extent: Scotland

Dates
- Royal assent: 14 August 1903
- Commencement: 15 May 1904 (Note: Section 102.)
- Repealed: 13 December 1982
Other legislation
Amends	Burgh Police (Scotland) Act 1892
Amended by	Private Legislation Procedure (Scotland) Act 1936; Local Government (Scotland) Act 1947; Town and Country Planning (Scotland) Act 1947; Local Government Act 1948; Housing (Scotland) Act 1950; Food and Drugs (Scotland) Act 1956; Housing (Scotland) Act 1966; Sewerage (Scotland) Act 1968
Repealed by	Local Government (Scotland) Act 1973; Local Government (Scotland) Act 1978

Status: Repealed

Text of statute as originally enacted

The Burgh Police (Scotland) Act 1903 (3 Edw. 7. c. 33) amended the 1892 act and included a number of provisions relating to building within a burgh. The burgh was to maintain a register of plans and petitions (in modern terms a register of planning permissions). Permitted developments were to be issued building warrants by the town council, and the burgh surveyor was empowered to enforce the warrants and rectify unauthorised building. New powers were given to town councils in relation to the maintenance of footpaths and public rubbish bins, and the placing of advertisement hoardings and scaffolding. Minimum standards were set for the height and internal space of new buildings and on overcrowding, and for the width of streets. Powers were given to the burgh to make new streets and openings. Also included in the Act were various sundry powers and duties including the compulsory lighting of vehicles, licensing for billiard halls and ice cream shops, prohibition on betting in the street, powers on controlling milk supply, and penalties for littering.

The Local Government (Scotland) Act 1929 (19 & 20 Geo. 5. c. 25) divided burghs, royal or police, into "large" and "small" burghs.

== See also ==
- List of burghs in Scotland
