= 1974 Nairn District Council election =

Nairn District Council election

7 May 1974	1977 →

All 10 seats to Nairn District Council 6 seats needed for a majority

	First party	Second party
Party	Independent	SNP
Seats won	6	4
Popular vote	1,053	375
Percentage	73.7%	26.3%
Council Control after election
Independent

Elections to Nairn District Council were held on 7 May 1974, on the same day as the other Scottish local government elections. This was the first election to the district council following the implementation of the Local Government (Scotland) Act 1973.

The election used the 10 wards created by the Formation Electoral Arrangements in 1974. Each ward elected one councillor using first-past-the-post voting.

Independent candidates took control of the council after winning a majority – six – of seats. Nairn was considered an intermediate district in terms of its partisanship as 60 per cent of councillors were not affiliated to a political party. The remaining four seats were won by the Scottish National Party (SNP).

== Background ==
Prior to 1974, the area that was to become Nairn was made up of the County of Nairn which included the burgh of Nairn. This was a small burgh so the burgh council had limited powers which included some control over planning as well as local taxation, building control, housing, lighting and drainage with the rest of the local government responsibility falling to the county council. Although the County of Moray and the County of Nairn remained as separate entities, they had been combined for most but not all purposes as a result of the Local Government (Scotland) Act 1929 and the Local Government (Scotland) Act 1947.

Following the recommendations in the Wheatly Report, the old system of counties and burghs – which had resulted in a mishmash of local government areas in which some small burghs had larger populations but far fewer responsibilities than some large burghs and even counties – was to be replaced by a new system of regional and district councils. The Local Government (Scotland) Act 1973 implemented most of the recommendations in the Wheatly Report. The County of Nairn was placed into the Nairn district within the Highland region.

== Results ==
1974 Nairn District Council election result 1974
Party	Seats	Gains	Losses	Net gain/loss	Seats %	Votes %	Votes	+/−
Independent	6			N/A	60.0	73.7	1,053	N/A
SNP	4			N/A	40.0	26.3	375	N/A

== Aftermath ==
Nairn, like the other seven districts in Highland, saw more independent candidates elected than political parties. Independents took six seats and the Scottish National Party (SNP) won the remaining four seats. Independents also controlled the regional council which held its first election on the same day. Across Scotland, Labour won the most votes, the most seats and the most councils of any party.
