= Scottish referendum =

Scottish referendum may refer to any one of several referendums in Scotland:

- 1920 Scottish licensing referendum
- 1979 Scottish devolution referendum
- 1997 Scottish devolution referendum
- 2014 Scottish independence referendum
- Proposed second Scottish independence referendum
