= Licensing (Scotland) Act 1959 =

Act of the Parliament of the United Kingdom

Licensing (Scotland) Act 1959 (Note: Section 201(1).)
- Act of Parliament
- Parliament of the United Kingdom
- Long title: An Act to consolidate certain enactments which relate to licensing in Scotland and to matters connected therewith, with corrections and improvements made under the Consolidation of Enactments (Procedure) Act, 1949.
- Citation: 7 & 8 Eliz. 2. c. 51
- Territorial extent: Scotland (Note: Section 201(2).)

Dates
- Royal assent: 9 July 1959
- Commencement: 1 January 1960 (Note: Section 201(3).)
- Repealed: 1 July 1977
Other legislation
Amends	See § Repealed enactments
Repeals/revokes	See § Repealed enactments
Amended by	Law Reform (Miscellaneous Provisions) (Scotland) Act 1966; Statute Law (Repeals) Act 1974
Repealed by	Licensing (Scotland) Act 1976
Relates to	Licensing Act 1953

Status: Repealed

Text of statute as originally enacted

The Licensing (Scotland) Act 1959 (7 & 8 Eliz. 2. c. 51) was an act of the Parliament of the United Kingdom that consolidated enactments relating to licensing in Scotland.

== Provisions ==
=== Repealed enactments ===
Section 200(1) of the act repealed 18 enactments, listed in the twelfth schedule to the act.

Citation	Short title	Extent of repeal
34 & 35 Vict. c. 112	Prevention of Crimes Act 1871	In section ten the words "any lodging-house, beer-house, public house, or other house or place where intoxicating liquors are sold, or" and the words "for the sale of any intoxicating liquors, or".
3 Edw. 7. c. 25	Licensing (Scotland) Act 1903	Sections one to sixty-nine; in section seventy, the words "or on any licensed premises", wherever they occur; section seventy-two; sections seventy-four to ninety; section ninety-one except so far as applying in relation to offences under section seventy; sections ninety-two and ninety-three; section ninety-four except so far as applying in relation to offences under section seventy; sections ninety-five to one hundred; sections one hundred and one to one hundred and five except so far as applying in relation to offences under section seventy; section one hundred and six; section one hundred and seven except the definitions of "constable" and "magistrate" contained therein; section one hundred and ten; the First to the Twelfth Schedules.
3 & 4 Geo. 5. c. 33	Temperance (Scotland) Act 1913	The whole act.
11 & 12 Geo. 5. c. 42	Licensing Act 1921	The whole act.
13 & 14 Geo. 5. c. 28	Intoxicating Liquor (Sale to Persons under Eighteen) Act 1923	The whole act.
24 & 25 Geo. 5. c. 26	Licensing (Permitted Hours) Act 1934	The whole act.
1 Edw. 8 & 1 Geo. 6. c. 37	Children and Young Persons (Scotland) Act 1937	Section seventeen.
5 & 6 Geo. 6. c. 21	Finance Act 1942	In section ten, in subsection (1), the words "this and" and "and in the Sixth Schedule to this Act" and subsections (2) to (7). Part II of the Sixth Schedule.
7 & 8 Geo. 6. c. 23	Finance Act 1944	Section nine.
9 & 10 Geo. 6. c. 64	Finance Act 1946	Section thirteen.
10 & 11 Geo. 6. c. 43	Local Government (Scotland) Act 1947	Section three hundred and sixty-five.
11 & 12 Geo. 6. c. 65	Representation of the People Act 1948	Section sixty-three and, in the Seventh Schedule, the amendments of the Licensing (Scotland) Act, 1903, the Temperance (Scotland) Act, 1913, the Licensing Act, 1921 and the Licensing (Permitted Hours) Act, 1934.
12, 13 & 14 Geo. 6. c. 59	Licensing Act 1949	The whole act, except subsection (1) of section four, subsection (4) of section forty-two and subsection (1) of section forty-three.
15 & 16 Geo. 6. c. 44	Customs and Excise Act 1952	In section one hundred and fifty-one, in subsection (2), paragraph (b) and the proviso.
15 & 16 Geo. 6 & 1 Eliz. 2. c. 65	Licensed Premises in New Towns Act 1952	The whole act.
2 & 3 Eliz. 2. c. 11	Licensing (Seamen's Canteens) Act 1954	The whole act.
4 & 5 Eliz. 2. c. 37	Licensing (Airports) Act 1956	The whole act.
4 & 5 Eliz. 2. c. 42	Occasional Licences and Young Persons Act 1956	The whole act.

== Subsequent developments ==
Section 200(1) of, and schedule 12 to, the act were repealed by section 1 of, and part XI of the schedule to, the Statute Law (Repeals) Act 1974, which came into force on 27 June 1974.

The whole act was repealed by section 136(2) of, and schedule 8 to, the Licensing (Scotland) Act 1976, which came into force on 1 July 1977.
