= 1980 Nairn District Council election =

1980 Scottish local government election

| ← 1977 | 1 May 1980 | 1984 → |

All 10 seats to Nairn District Council 6 seats needed for a majority

| | First party | Second party |
|---|---|---|
| Party | Independent | SNP |
| Seats won | 10 | 0 |
| Seat change | ▲2 | ▼2 |
| Popular vote | 1,045 | 55 |
| Percentage | 95.0% | 5.0% |
| Swing | ▲48.6% | ▼48.6% |
Council Control before election
Independent
Council Control after election
Independent

Elections to the Nairn District Council took place in May 1980, alongside elections to the councils of Scotland's other districts.

== Aggregate results ==
Nairn District Election Result 1980
| Party | Seats | Gains | Losses | Net gain/loss | Seats % | Votes % | Votes | +/− |
|---|---|---|---|---|---|---|---|---|
| Independent | 10 | 2 | 0 | ▲2 | 100.0 | 95.0 | 1,045 | ▲48.6 |
| SNP | 0 | 0 | 2 | ▼2 | 0.0 | 5.0 | 55 | ▼48.6 |
