= 1984 Nairn District Council election =

1984 Scottish local election

← 1980	3 May 1984	1988 →

All 10 seats to Nairn District Council 6 seats needed for a majority

	First party	Second party
Party	Independent	Labour
Seats won	9	1
Seat change	▼1	▲1
Popular vote	1,225	400
Percentage	74.1%	24.2%
Swing	▼20.9%	New
Council Control before election
Independent
Council Control after election
Independent

Elections to the Nairn District Council took place in May 1984, alongside elections to the councils of Scotland's other districts.

== Aggregate results ==
Nairn District Election Result 1984
Party	Seats	Gains	Losses	Net gain/loss	Seats %	Votes %	Votes	+/−
Independent	9	0	▼1	▼1		74.1	1,225	▼20.9
Labour	1	▲1	0	▲1		24.2	400	New
SNP	0	0	0	0	0.0	1.7	28	▼3.3
