= 1977 Nairn District Council election =

1977 Scottish local government election

← 1974	7 May 1977	1980 →

All 10 seats to Nairn District Council 6 seats needed for a majority

	First party	Second party
Party	Independent	SNP
Seats won	8	2
Seat change	▲2	▼2
Popular vote	456	527
Percentage	46.4%	53.6%
Swing	▼27.3%	▲27.3%
Council Control before election
Independent
Council Control after election
Independent

Elections to the Nairn District Council took place in May 1977, alongside elections to the councils of Scotland's other districts.

== Aggregate results ==
Nairn District Election Result 1977
Party	Seats	Gains	Losses	Net gain/loss	Seats %	Votes %	Votes	+/−
Independent	8			▲2	80.0	46.4	456	▼27.3
SNP	2			▼2	20.0	53.6	527	▲27.3
