= Local Government (Scotland) Act 1947 =

Act of the Parliament of the United Kingdom

Local Government (Scotland) Act 1947 (Note: Section 382(1).)
- Act of Parliament
- Parliament of the United Kingdom
- Long title: An Act to consolidate with amendments the enactments relating to authorities for the purposes of local government in Scotland.
- Citation: 10 & 11 Geo. 6. c. 65
- Territorial extent: Scotland (Note: Section 382(2).)

Dates
- Royal assent: 31 July 1947
- Commencement: 1 October 1947
Other legislation
| Amends | Children and Young Persons (Scotland) Act 1937 |
| Repeals/revokes | Burial Grounds (Scotland) Act 1857; Boundaries of Burghs Extension (Scotland) Act 1857; Poor Law (Scotland) No. 1 Act 1861; Poor Law (Scotland) No. 1 Act 1861; Magistrates (Scotland) Act 1870; Borough Funds Act 1872; Local Taxation Returns (Scotland) Act 1881; Municipal Elections (Scotland) Act 1890; Local Authorities Loans (Scotland) Act 1891; Local Authorities Loans (Scotland) Act, 1891, Amendment Act 1893; Burgh Police (Scotland) Act 1893; Local Government (Scotland) Act, 1894, Amendment Act 1895; Municipal Elections (Scotland) Act 1897; County Councils (Bills in Parliament) Act 1903; Town Councils (Scotland) Act 1903; Qualification of Women (County and Town Councils) (Scotland) Act 1907; Polling Districts (County Councils) Act 1908; County, Town and Parish Councils (Qualification) (Scotland) Act 1914; Local Government (Adjustments) (Scotland) Act 1914; Public Authorities and Bodies (Loans) Act 1916; Mental Deficiency and Lunacy (Amendment) Act 1919; Town Councils (Scotland) Act 1923; Local Authorities Loans (Scotland) Act 1924; Education (Scotland) Act 1925; Allotments (Scotland) Act 1926; Public Health (Water and Sewerage) (Scotland) Act 1935; Education (Scotland) Act 1936; Local Government Amendment (Scotland) Act 1939 |
| Amended by | Local Government Act 1948; National Assistance Act 1948; Representation of the People Act 1948; Representation of the People Act 1949; Housing (Scotland) Act 1950; Diseases of Animals Act 1950; Licensing (Scotland) Act 1959; Local Authorities (Expenditure on Special Purposes) (Scotland) Act 1961; Education (Scotland) Act 1963; Public Works Loans Act 1964; Local Government (Scotland) Act 1966; National Loans Act 1968; Sewerage (Scotland) Act 1968; Statute Law (Repeals) Act 1973; Local Government (Scotland) Act 1973; Statute Law (Repeals) Act 1976; Inshore Fishing (Scotland) Act 1984; Debtors (Scotland) Act 1987 |
| Relates to | Town and Country Planning (Scotland) Act 1947 |

Status: Partially repealed

Text of statute as originally enacted

Text of the Local Government (Scotland) Act 1947 as in force today (including any amendments) within the United Kingdom, from legislation.gov.uk.

The Local Government (Scotland) Act 1947 (10 & 11 Geo. 6. c. 65) is an act of the Parliament of the United Kingdom, that reformed local government in Scotland, on 1 October 1947.

Section 1 of the act reads:

For the purposes of local government, Scotland shall be divided into counties, counties of cities, large burghs and small burghs, and the landward area of every county shall, save as provided in this Part of this Act, be divided into districts.

The umbrella organisation for district councils in Scotland at this time was the Scottish Association of District Councils. Notable presidents of this body included the playwright Robert McLellan who was elected in 1962 and presided at the moment when Westminster announced its intention to institute the review local government in Scotland which would eventually lead to Lord Wheatley's abolition of district councils in the early 1970s.

== New local government areas ==
Section 2 defines the new local government areas. From Schedule 1:

=== Counties ===
- Aberdeen
- Angus
- Argyll
- Ayr
- Banff
- Berwick
- Bute
- Caithness
- Clackmannan
- Dumfries
- Dumbarton
- East Lothian
- Fife
- Inverness
- Kincardine
- Kinross
- Kirkcudbright
- Lanark
- Midlothian
- Moray
- Nairn
- Orkney
- Peebles
- Perth
- Renfrew
- Ross and Cromarty
- Roxburgh
- Selkirk
- Stirling
- Sutherland
- West Lothian
- Wigtown
- Zetland

=== Counties of cities ===
- Aberdeen
- Dundee
- Edinburgh
- Glasgow

=== Large burghs ===
- Airdrie
- Arbroath
- Ayr
- Clydebank
- Coatbridge
- Dumbarton
- Dumfries
- Dunfermline
- Falkirk
- Greenock
- Hamilton
- Inverness
- Kilmarnock
- Kirkcaldy
- Motherwell and Wishaw
- Paisley
- Perth
- Port Glasgow
- Rutherglen
- Stirling

=== Small burghs ===
- Aberchirder
- Aberfeldy
- Aberlour
- Abernethy
- Alloa
- Alva
- Alyth
- Annan
- Ardrossan
- Armadale
- Auchterarder
- Auchtermuchty
- Ballater
- Banchory
- Banff
- Barrhead
- Bathgate
- Biggar
- Blairgowrie and Rattray
- Bo'ness
- Bonnyrigg and Lasswade
- Brechin
- Bridge of Allan
- Buckhaven and Methil
- Buckie
- Burghead
- Burntisland
- Callander
- Campbeltown
- Carnoustie
- Castle Douglas
- Cockenzie and Port Seton
- Coldstream
- Coupar Angus
- Cove and Kilcreggan
- Cowdenbeath
- Crail
- Crieff
- Cromarty
- Cullen
- Culross
- Cumnock and Holmhead
- Cupar
- Dalbeattie
- Dalkeith
- Darvel
- Denny and Dunipace
- Dingwall
- Dollar
- Dornoch
- Doune
- Dufftown
- Dunbar
- Dunblane
- Dunoon
- Duns
- East Linton
- Elgin
- Elie and Earlsferry
- Ellon
- Eyemouth
- Falkland
- Findochty
- Forfar
- Forres
- Fort William
- Fortrose
- Fraserburgh
- Galashiels
- Galston
- Gatehouse
- Girvan
- Gourock
- Grangemouth
- Grantown-on-Spey
- Haddington
- Hawick
- Helensburgh
- Huntly
- Innerleithen
- Inveraray
- Inverbervie
- Invergordon
- Inverkeithing
- Inverurie
- Irvine
- Jedburgh
- Johnstone
- Keith
- Kelso
- Kilrenny, Anstruther Easter and Anstruther Wester
- Kilsyth
- Kilwinning
- Kinghorn
- Kingussie
- Kinross
- Kintore
- Kirkcudbright
- Kirkintilloch
- Kirkwall
- Kirriemuir
- Ladybank
- Lanark
- Langholm
- Largs
- Lauder
- Laurencekirk
- Lerwick
- Leslie
- Leven
- Linlithgow
- Loanhead
- Lochgelly
- Lochgilphead
- Lochmaben
- Lockerbie
- Lossiemouth and Branderburgh
- Macduff
- Markinch
- Maybole
- Melrose
- Millport
- Milngavie
- Moffat
- Monifieth
- Montrose
- Musselburgh
- Nairn
- New Galloway
- Newburgh
- Newmilns and Greenholm
- Newport
- Newton Stewart
- North Berwick
- Oban
- Oldmeldrum
- Peebles
- Penicuik
- Peterhead
- Pitlochry
- Pittenweem
- Portknockie
- Portsoy
- Prestonpans
- Prestwick
- Queensferry
- Renfrew
- Rosehearty
- Rothes
- Rothesay
- Saltcoats
- Sanquhar
- Selkirk
- St Andrews
- St. Monance
- Stewarton
- Stonehaven
- Stornoway
- Stranraer
- Stromness
- Tain
- Tayport
- Thurso
- Tillicoultry
- Tobermory
- Tranent
- Troon
- Turriff
- Whitburn
- Whithorn
- Wick
- Wigtown

The local government divisions established by the 1947 act were abolished by the Local Government (Scotland) Act 1973.

=== Repealed enactments ===
Section 381 of the act repealed 178 enactments, listed in the fourteenth schedule to the act.

| Citation | Short title | Extent of repeal |
|---|---|---|
| 6 Geo. 4. c. 22 | Jurors (Scotland) Act 1825 | In section two, the words " all " magistrates of royal burghs." |
| 8 & 9 Vict. c. 83 | Poor Law (Scotland) Act 1845 | In section nine, the words from " and also by a summons " to the end of the section. |
| 8 & 9 Vict. c. 83 | Poor Law (Scotland) Act 1845 | Sections ten to thirteen, so far as unrepealed. |
| 8 & 9 Vict. c. 83 | Poor Law (Scotland) Act 1845 | Sections sixteen and seventeen. |
| 8 & 9 Vict. c. 83 | Poor Law (Scotland) Act 1845 | In section thirty, the words from the beginning of the section to " provided always that ". |
| 8 & 9 Vict. c. 83 | Poor Law (Scotland) Act 1845 | Section thirty-three. |
| 8 & 9 Vict. c. 83 | Poor Law (Scotland) Act 1845 | Section forty-six. |
| 8 & 9 Vict. c. 83 | Poor Law (Scotland) Act 1845 | Section fifty-three. |
| 8 & 9 Vict. c. 83 | Poor Law (Scotland) Act 1845 | In section sixty-two, the words from " and for the more " to the end of the section, so far as unrepealed. |
| 8 & 9 Vict. c. 83 | Poor Law (Scotland) Act 1845 | Section eighty-seven. |
| 17 & 18 Vict. c. 80 | Registration of Births, Deaths and Marriages (Scotland) Act 1854 | In section fifty, the words from " and it shall be lawful " to "sheriff may direct." |
| 17 & 18 Vict. c. 80 | Registration of Births, Deaths and Marriages (Scotland) Act 1854 | In section fifty-one, the words " out of the assessment to " be levied as hereinbefore " directed " and the word "which" where that word second occurs. |
| 17 & 18 Vict. c. 91 | Lands Valuation (Scotland) Act 1854 | In section three, the words from " and every such assessor shall " be removable " to the end of the section. |
| 17 & 18 Vict. c. 91 | Lands Valuation (Scotland) Act 1854 | In section eighteen, the words after the words "the just "amount thereof" to the end of the section. |
| 17 & 18 Vict. c. 91 | Lands Valuation (Scotland) Act 1854 | Section thirty-one. |
| 17 & 18 Vict. c. 91 | Lands Valuation (Scotland) Act 1854 | Section thirty-six, so far as unrepealed. |
| 18 & 19 Vict. c. 68 | Burial Grounds (Scotland) Act 1855 | In section fourteen, the words from "and the proportion " to "in manner after-mentioned ". |
| 18 & 19 Vict. c. 68 | Burial Grounds (Scotland) Act 1855 | In section, twenty-six, the words from "to be levied " to the end of the section. |
| 18 & 19 Vict. c. 68 | Burial Grounds (Scotland) Act 1855 | In section twenty-seven, the words from ."and to .charge " to the end of the section. |
| 18 & 19 Vict. c. 68 | Burial Grounds (Scotland) Act 1855 | Sections twenty-nine and thirty. |
| 20 & 21 Vict. c. 42 | Burial Grounds (Scotland) Act 1857 | The whole Act, so far a unrepealed. |
| 20 & 21 Vict. c. 70 | Boundaries of Burghs Extension (Scotland) Act 1857 | The whole act. |
| 20 & 21 Vict. c. 71 | Lunacy (Scotland) Act 1857 | In section fifty-two, the words from " and all the powers " to the end of the section. |
| 20 & 21 Vict. c. 71 | Lunacy (Scotland) Act 1857 | In section fifty-three, the words from " and it shall be lawful " to the end of the section. |
| 20 & 21 Vict. c. 71 | Lunacy (Scotland) Act 1857 | Section fifty-seven. |
| 20 & 21 Vict. c. 71 | Lunacy (Scotland) Act 1857 | In section sixty-one, the words from "on the security" to " any part thereof ", the words from " in such district " to, " within the same", and the words from " and every such security " to the end of the section. |
| 20 & 21 Vict. c. 71 | Lunacy (Scotland) Act 1857 | Sections sixty-two to sixty-seven. |
| 20 & 21 Vict. c. 71 | Lunacy (Scotland) Act 1857 | In section sixty-eight, the words from " and it shall be the duty " to " respectively ". |
| 20 & 21 Vict. c. 71 | Lunacy (Scotland) Act 1857 | Section seventy-two. |
| 20 & 21 Vict. c. 71 | Lunacy (Scotland) Act 1857 | Section seventy-four. |
| 20 & 21 Vict. c. 71 | Lunacy (Scotland) Act 1857 | Schedule (K). |
| 20 & 21 Vict. c. 72 | Police (Scotland) Act 1857 | Sections two and three. |
| 20 & 21 Vict. c. 72 | Police (Scotland) Act 1857 | In section four, the words from the beginning of the section to " Secretary of State," the words " on not less than ten or more " than twenty days' notice," the words " according to the "rules," and the words "as " aforesaid." |
| 20 & 21 Vict. c. 72 | Police (Scotland) Act 1857 | In section twenty-eight, the word " such," the words " as may be " allowed by the rules to be " established under this Act." and the words " out of the " police assessments to be made " and levied by them in terms " of this Act." |
| 20 & 21 Vict. c. 72 | Police (Scotland) Act 1857 | Sections twenty-nine to thirty-three. |
| 20 & 21 Vict. c. 72 | Police (Scotland) Act 1857 | Sections forty to forty-three. |
| 20 & 21 Vict. c. 72 | Police (Scotland) Act 1857 | Section fifty. |
| 20 & 21 Vict. c. 72 | Police (Scotland) Act 1857 | In section fifty-four, the words from " provided always that " in " to the end of the section. |
| 20 & 21 Vict. c. 73 | Smoke Nuisance (Scotland) Act 1857 | In section twelve, the words from "to be levied " to the end of the section. . |
| 21 & 22 Vict. c. 90 | Medical Act 1858 | In section thirty-six, the words "or as a medical officer of " health ". |
| 22 & 23 Vict. c. 66 | Sale of Gas Act 1859 | Section seven. |
| 23 & 24 Vict. c. 79 | Sheriff Court Houses (Scotland) Act 1860 | Section twelve. |
| 23 & 24 Vict. c. 79 | Sheriff Court Houses (Scotland) Act 1860 | In section fifteen, the words from ."as herein provided " to the end of the section. |
| 23 & 24 Vict. c. 79 | Sheriff Court Houses (Scotland) Act 1860 | Sections nineteen to twenty-one. |
| 23 & 24 Vict. c. 79 | Sheriff Court Houses (Scotland) Act 1860 | Sections twenty-three to twenty-five. |
| 23 & 24 Vict. c. 79 | Sheriff Court Houses (Scotland) Act 1860 | In section twenty-six, the words " on .bonds or mortgage", and the words from " any sum not " exceeding" to the end of the section. |
| 23 & 24 Vict. c. 79 | Sheriff Court Houses (Scotland) Act 1860 | Sections twenty-seven and twenty-eight. |
| 23 & 24 Vict. c. 85 | Registration of Births, Deaths and Marriages (Scotland) Act 1860 | In section eight, the words from "and the cost" to "first " recited Act ", and the word " aforesaid." |
| 24 & 25 Vict. c. 18 | Poor Law (Scotland) No. 1 Act 1861 | The whole act. |
| 24 & 25 Vict. c. 69 | Tramways (Scot land) Act 1861 | In section eight, the words " on "the credit ; of such tolls and revenues ", the words from "and to grant" to " notwithstanding", and the words from "Provided that" to the end of the section. |
| 25 & 26 Vict. c. 54 | Lunacy (Scotland) Act 1862 | Section ten. |
| 25 & 26 Vict. c. 54 | Lunacy (Scotland) Act 1862 | Sections twelve and thirteen. |
| 26 & 27 Vict. c. 108 | Vaccination (Scotland) Act 1863 | In section six, the words from " including any share " to the end of the section. |
| 26 & 27 Vict. c. 108 | Vaccination (Scotland) Act 1863 | In section sixteen, the, words from " and the sums " to the end of the section. |
| 26 & 27 Vict. c. 108 | Vaccination (Scotland) Act 1863 | Section twenty-eight |
| 29 & 30 Vict. c. 51 | Lunacy (Scotland) Act 1866 | In section twenty-seven, the words from " on the security " to the end of the section. |
| 31 & 32 Vict. c. 82 | County General Assessment (Scotland) Act 1868 | The whole Act, so far a unrepealed. |
| 33 & 34 Vict. c. 37 | Magistrates (Scotland) Act 1870 | The whole Act, so far a unrepealed. |
| 33 & 34 Vict. c. 42 | Burgh Customs (Scotland) Act 1870 | In section two, the words from " but not exceeding " to " boundaries of such burgh ", and the words from " and such rate " to " leviable within such burgh." |
| 33 & 34 Vict. c. 78 | Tramways Act 1870 | In section twenty, the words " and take up at interest on the "credit of such local . rate ", and the words from " and for " the purpose of securing " to " and the local authority ". |
| 33 & 34 Vict. c. 78 | Tramways Act 1870 | In section forty-three, the words " out Of the "tike rate " and " on " the security of the same ". |
| 33 & 34 Vict. c. 78 | Tramways Act 1870 | In section forty-four, the words from " may pay " to "for such purposes |
| 34 & 35 Vict. c. 56 | Dogs Act 1871 | In section five, the words " and "local rate," and the words " and the rate mentioned in the " third column." |
| 34 & 35 Vict. c. 56 | Dogs Act 1871 | In the Schedule, the entries in the third column so far as relating to the town council or the police commissioners. |
| 34 & 35 Vict. c. 96 | Pedlars Act 1871 | In section twenty, in proviso 6, the words " in aid of the county general assessment" and the words "in aid of the police funds." |
| 34 & 35 Vict. c. 96 | Pedlars Act 1871 | In section twenty-one, the words " police assessment levied for " support of the police of the ", and the words " in aid of such " assessment." |
| 35 & 36 Vict. c. 33 | Ballot Act 1872 | In section fourteen, the words " municipal or ". |
| 35 & 36 Vict. c. 33 | Ballot Act 1872 | Sections twenty to twenty-two. |
| 35 & 36 Vict. c. 33 | Ballot Act 1872 | In section twenty-four, the words "and municipal" wherever those words occur, and the words " or at a municipal election ". |
| 35 & 36 Vict. c. 33 | Ballot Act 1872 | In section twenty-nine, paragraph (b) in the definition of the expression " Municipal " Corporation Acts ", and paragraph (b) in the definition of the expression " municipal election ". |
| 35 & 36 Vict. c. 33 | Ballot Act 1872 | In the First Schedule, in Part II, paragraphs 64 and 65. |
| 35 & 36 Vict. c. 33 | Ballot Act 1872 | In the Second Schedule, the note regarding the form of nomination paper in a municipal election. |
| 35 & 36 Vict. c. 91 | Borough Funds Act 1872 | The whole Act, so far a unrepealed. |
| 38 & 39 Vict. c. 17 | Explosives Act 1875 | In section seventy, the words from "In a borough " to " borough " rate ", the words from ." In " any place " to " county rate ", and the words from "and the " local rate " to the end of the section. |
| 38 & 39 Vict. c. 17 | Explosives Act 1875 | In section seventy-two, the words from "acquire any land" to "to them and", the words from "Such sums shall be "applied " to " out of the local "rate", the words "on the " security of the local rate " and the words from " Any such " loan" to "to include any " right over land ", except so far as relates to harbour authorities. |
| 38 & 39 Vict. c. 17 | Explosives Act 1875 | In section one hundred and nine, subsection (11), except so far as relates to harbour authorities. |
| 38 & 39 Vict. c. 17 | Explosives Act 1875 | In section one hundred and eleven, paragraphs (a) and (c), and the words from " the rates or " assessments " to -the end of the section, except so far as relates to harbour authorities. |
| 38 & 39 Vict. c. 17 | Explosives Act 1875 | In section one hundred and twelve, the words from" provided that" to the end of the section. |
| 39 & 40 Vict. c. 49 | Burghs Gas Supply (Scotland) Act 1876 | In section five, the words from " and in the event of " to the end of the section. |
| 39 & 40 Vict. c. 49 | Burghs Gas Supply (Scotland) Act 1876 | In section six, the words from the beginning of the section to " powers of this Act ". |
| 39 & 40 Vict. c. 49 | Burghs Gas Supply (Scotland) Act 1876 | Section eight. |
| 39 & 40 Vict. c. 49 | Burghs Gas Supply (Scotland) Act 1876 | Sections ten to thirteen. |
| 39 & 40 Vict. c. 49 | Burghs Gas Supply (Scotland) Act 1876 | Sections fifteen to seventeen. |
| 39 & 40 Vict. c. 49 | Burghs Gas Supply (Scotland) Act 1876 | In section eighteen, the words from " and may purchase " to " for these purposes ". |
| 39 & 40 Vict. c. 49 | Burghs Gas Supply (Scotland) Act 1876 | Section nineteen. |
| 39 & 40 Vict. c. 49 | Burghs Gas Supply (Scotland) Act 1876 | In section twenty-seven, the words " on mortgage ", and the words from " and to grant" to the end of the section. |
| 39 & 40 Vict. c. 49 | Burghs Gas Supply (Scotland) Act 1876 | Sections twenty-eight to thirtyone. |
| 39 & 40 Vict. c. 49 | Burghs Gas Supply (Scotland) Act 1876 | In section thirty-two, in paragraph 1, the words " or mortgagee ", and the words " or " interest on a mortgage", paragraph 2, in paragraph 3, the words " or mortgagees" and the words " or interest on "mortgages,"-and paragraph 4. |
| 39 & 40 Vict. c. 49 | Burghs Gas Supply (Scotland) Act 1876 | In section thirty-three, the words " whether ", " principal ", and " or interest ". |
| 39 & 40 Vict. c. 49 | Burghs Gas Supply (Scotland) Act 1876 | Sections thirty-four and thirty-five. |
| 39 & 40 Vict. c. 49 | Burghs Gas Supply (Scotland) Act 1876 | In section thirty-eight, the words " under the provisions and ". |
| 39 & 40 Vict. c. 49 | Burghs Gas Supply (Scotland) Act 1876 | Sections thirty-nine and forty. |
| 39 & 40 Vict. c. 49 | Burghs Gas Supply (Scotland) Act 1876 | In section forty-one, the words " required by this Act ". |
| 39 & 40 Vict. c. 49 | Burghs Gas Supply (Scotland) Act 1876 | Schedules (C), (D) and (E). |
| 39 & 40 Vict. c. 75 | Rivers Pollution Prevention Act 1876 | In section eight, the paragraph commencing " Any expenses " incurred ". |
| 39 & 40 Vict. c. 75 | Rivers Pollution Prevention Act 1876 | In section fourteen, the words from the beginning of the section to " such order and ". |
| 39 & 40 Vict. c. 75 | Rivers Pollution Prevention Act 1876 | Section fifteen. |
| 39 & 40 Vict. c. 75 | Rivers Pollution Prevention Act 1876 | In section twenty-one, subsections (3), (8) and (g). |
| 40 & 41 Vict. c. 53 | Prisons (Scotland) Act 1877 | Sections twenty-four and twenty-five. |
| 40 & 41 Vict. c. 53 | Prisons (Scotland) Act 1877 | In section fifty-five, the words from " as one loan " to the end of the section. |
| 40 & 41 Vict. c. 53 | Prisons (Scotland) Act 1877 | Section fifty-six. |
| 40 & 41 Vict. c. 53 | Prisons (Scotland) Act 1877 | Section sixty. |
| 40 & 41 Vict. c. 53 | Prisons (Scotland) Act 1877 | Section sixty-three. |
| 40 & 41 Vict. c. 68 | Destructive Insects Act 1877 | In section four, the words from " the expenses incurred " to " local rate ". |
| 41 & 42 Vict. c. 8 | Public Parks (Scotland), Act 1878 | In section five, the words from the beginning of the section to " Provided that," and the words " in terms of this section ". |
| 41 & 42 Vict. c. 8 | Public Parks (Scotland), Act 1878 | Section seven. |
| 41 & 42 Vict. c. 8 | Public Parks (Scotland), Act 1878 | Section thirteen. |
| 41 & 42 Vict. c. 8 | Public Parks (Scotland), Act 1878 | In section fourteen, the words from " on the security ", where first occurring, to the end of the section. |
| 41 & 42 Vict. c. 8 | Public Parks (Scotland), Act 1878 | Section fifteen. |
| 41 & 42 Vict. c. 8 | Public Parks (Scotland), Act 1878 | Sections sixteen to twenty. |
| 41 & 42 Vict. c. 8 | Public Parks (Scotland), Act 1878 | Sections twenty-two to twenty-four. |
| 41 & 42 Vict. c. 8 | Public Parks (Scotland), Act 1878 | In section twenty-seven, the words from " The Lands Clauses ", where those words first occur, to " 1860 " and the words from " sell "to " inner house thereof." |
| 41 & 42 Vict. c. 49 | Weights and Measures Act 1878 | Section fifty so far as relating to a local rate. |
| 41 & 42 Vict. c. 49 | Weights and Measures Act 1878 | Section fifty-one. |
| 41 & 42 Vict. c. 49 | Weights and Measures Act 1878 | Fourth Schedule so far as relating to a local rate. |
| 41 & 42 Vict. c. 51 | Roads and Bridges (Scotland) Act 1878 | Section thirty-four. |
| 41 & 42 Vict. c. 51 | Roads and Bridges (Scotland) Act 1878 | In section forty-nine, the words from " and to the clerk" to " district respectively", and the words from " and each " district committee " to the end of the section. |
| 41 & 42 Vict. c. 51 | Roads and Bridges (Scotland) Act 1878 | Section fifty. |
| 41 & 42 Vict. c. 51 | Roads and Bridges (Scotland) Act 1878 | Section fifty-two. |
| 41 & 42 Vict. c. 51 | Roads and Bridges (Scotland) Act 1878 | Sections fifty-four and fifty-five. |
| 41 & 42 Vict. c. 51 | Roads and Bridges (Scotland) Act 1878 | In section fifty-eight, the words from "at a meeting" to "of " the meeting ", the words from " and many require " to "of the same ", and the words from " and the expense " to " fifty " years ". |
| 41 & 42 Vict. c. 51 | Roads and Bridges (Scotland) Act 1878 | Section seventy-four. |
| 41 & 42 Vict. c. 51 | Roads and Bridges (Scotland) Act 1878 | In section seventy-five, the words from " on the security" to " respective boundaries", the word " such " occurring between the words " off " and " debts ", and the words from " and such " moneys may be borrowed " to the end of the section. |
| 41 & 42 Vict. c. 51 | Roads and Bridges (Scotland) Act 1878 | Sections seventy-six to seventy-nine. |
| 41 & 42 Vict. c. 51 | Roads and Bridges (Scotland) Act 1878 | Section eighty-two. |
| 41 & 42 Vict. c. 51 | Roads and Bridges (Scotland) Act 1878 | Section eighty-six. |
| 41 & 42 Vict. c. 51 | Roads and Bridges (Scotland) Act 1878 | In section eighty-seven, the words " in aid of the assessment " authorised to be imposed by " this Act", and the words " under the provisions of this Act". |
| 41 & 42 Vict. c. 51 | Roads and Bridges (Scotland) Act 1878 | In section eighty-eight, in subsection (3), the words from " and after hearing " to the end of the subsection, and subsection (6). |
| 41 & 42 Vict. c. 51 | Roads and Bridges (Scotland) Act 1878 | In section ninety, in subsection (2), the words from " and after " hearing" to the end of the subsection, and subsection (5). |
| 41 & 42 Vict. c. 51 | Roads and Bridges (Scotland) Act 1878 | In section ninety-three, the words from " on the security " to the end of the section. |
| 41 & 42 Vict. c. 51 | Roads and Bridges (Scotland) Act 1878 | Sections one hundred and five and one hundred and six. |
| 41 & 42 Vict. c. 51 | Roads and Bridges (Scotland) Act 1878 | Section one hundred and ten. |
| 41 & 42 Vict. c. 51 | Roads and Bridges (Scotland) Act 1878 | Sections one hundred and seventeen and one hundred and eighteen. |
| 41 & 42 Vict. c. 51 | Roads and Bridges (Scotland) Act 1878 | Schedule (B) No. 1. |
| 41 & 42 Vict. c. 51 | Roads and Bridges (Scotland) Act 1878 | Schedule (B) No. 2. |
| 44 & 45 Vict. c. 6 | Local Taxation Returns (Scotland) Act 1881 | The whole act. |
| 45 & 46 Vict. c. 56 | Electric Lighting Act 1882 | Section seven. |
| 45 & 46 Vict. c. 56 | Electric Lighting Act 1882 | In section eight, the words from " on such security " to " stock " as aforesaid ", excepting so far as the section relates to gas commissioners. |
| 46 & 47 Vict. c. 52 | Bankruptcy Act 1883 | In section thirty-two, in subsection (1), paragraph (d), and in paragraph (e),the words " school board ". |
| 46 & 47 Vict. c. 52 | Bankruptcy Act 1883 | In section thirty-four, the words "councillor" and "school "board". |
| 47 & 48 Vict. c. 42 | Sheriff Court Houses (Scotland) Amendment Act 1884 | In section six, the words from " and in the case ", where those words first occur, to " police " assessment levied therein ". |
| 48 & 49 Vict. c. 10 | Election (Hours of Poll) Act 1885 | The whole Act, except so far as relates to parliamentar elections. |
| 49 & 50 Vict. c. 51 | Poor Law Loans and Relief (Scotland) Act 1886 | Sections one to three. |
| 49 & 50 Vict. c. 51 | Poor Law Loans and Relief (Scotland) Act 1886 | The Schedule. |
| 50 & 51 Vict. c. 39 | Lunacy Districts (Scotland) Act 1887 | Section three. |
| 50 & 51 Vict. c. 39 | Lunacy Districts (Scotland) Act 1887 | In section five, the words from " and all assessments " to the end of the section. |
| 50 & 51 Vict. c. 42 | Public Libraries Consolidation (Scotland) Act 1887 | In section two, the words from " library rate " to " execution ". |
| 50 & 51 Vict. c. 42 | Public Libraries Consolidation (Scotland) Act 1887 | In section six, the words " on " the security of the library " rate to be afterwards levied ". |
| 50 & 51 Vict. c. 42 | Public Libraries Consolidation (Scotland) Act 1887 | Sections seven to nine. |
| 50 & 51 Vict. c. 42 | Public Libraries Consolidation (Scotland) Act 1887 | In section ten, the word " appropriate ", the words from " any " lands " to " herein provided ", and the words from " upon the " land " to " purchased ". |
| 50 & 51 Vict. c. 42 | Public Libraries Consolidation (Scotland) Act 1887 | Sections eleven to thirteen. |
| 50 & 51 Vict. c. 42 | Public Libraries Consolidation (Scotland) Act 1887 | In section fourteen, the words from "at interest" to " purposes thereof ", and the words from " and on repayment " to the end of the section. |
| 50 & 51 Vict. c. 42 | Public Libraries Consolidation (Scotland) Act 1887 | Sections fifteen and sixteen. |
| 50 & 51 Vict. c. 42 | Public Libraries Consolidation (Scotland) Act 1887 | In section thirty, the words from " shall provide " to " levied by " them and ". |
| 52 & 53 Vict. c. 50 | Local Government (Scotland) Act 1889 | Sections three to six. |
| 52 & 53 Vict. c. 50 | Local Government (Scotland) Act 1889 | Sections eight to ten, so far as unrepealed. |
| 52 & 53 Vict. c. 50 | Local Government (Scotland) Act 1889 | In section fourteen, the words from " Provided also that if " to the end of the section. |
| 52 & 53 Vict. c. 50 | Local Government (Scotland) Act 1889 | Section fifteen. |
| 52 & 53 Vict. c. 50 | Local Government (Scotland) Act 1889 | In section sixteen, in subsection (2), paragraphs (b) and (d). |
| 52 & 53 Vict. c. 50 | Local Government (Scotland) Act 1889 | Sections twenty-five to twenty-seven, so far as unrepealed. |
| 52 & 53 Vict. c. 50 | Local Government (Scotland) Act 1889 | Part V, so far as unrepealed. |
| 52 & 53 Vict. c. 50 | Local Government (Scotland) Act 1889 | In section thirty-seven, subsections (3) to (6). |
| 52 & 53 Vict. c. 50 | Local Government (Scotland) Act 1889 | Section thirty-eight. |
| 52 & 53 Vict. c. 50 | Local Government (Scotland) Act 1889 | In section thirty-nine, the words from the beginning of the section to " (that is to say) ", and subsections (2) to (6). |
| 52 & 53 Vict. c. 50 | Local Government (Scotland) Act 1889 | In section forty-one, the words from the beginning of the section to the end of paragraph (e), in paragraph (f), the words " without prejudice to the provisions of sections twenty-five " and twenty-six of this Act ", and paragraph (g). |
| 52 & 53 Vict. c. 50 | Local Government (Scotland) Act 1889 | Sections forty-three and forty-four. |
| 52 & 53 Vict. c. 50 | Local Government (Scotland) Act 1889 | Sections forty-nine to fifty-two, so far as unrepealed. |
| 52 & 53 Vict. c. 50 | Local Government (Scotland) Act 1889 | Section fifty-four. |
| 52 & 53 Vict. c. 50 | Local Government (Scotland) Act 1889 | In section fifty-five, subsection (3). |
| 52 & 53 Vict. c. 50 | Local Government (Scotland) Act 1889 | Sections fifty-six and fifty-seven |
| 52 & 53 Vict. c. 50 | Local Government (Scotland) Act 1889 | Sections fifty-nine to sixty-five. |
| 52 & 53 Vict. c. 50 | Local Government (Scotland) Act 1889 | In section sixty-seven, in subsection (1), the words from " on " the security " to " provisions " of this Act; and ", and subsections (2) to (6). |
| 52 & 53 Vict. c. 50 | Local Government (Scotland) Act 1889 | Section sixty-eight, so far as unrepealed. |
| 52 & 53 Vict. c. 50 | Local Government (Scotland) Act 1889 | Sections seventy-one and seventy-two. |
| 52 & 53 Vict. c. 50 | Local Government (Scotland) Act 1889 | In section seventy-three, subsections (1) to (5), and sub-section (7). |
| 52 & 53 Vict. c. 50 | Local Government (Scotland) Act 1889 | Sections seventy-four to seventy-six. |
| 52 & 53 Vict. c. 50 | Local Government (Scotland) Act 1889 | Section eighty-one. |
| 52 & 53 Vict. c. 50 | Local Government (Scotland) Act 1889 | Sections eighty-three and eighty-four. |
| 52 & 53 Vict. c. 50 | Local Government (Scotland) Act 1889 | Sections eighty-nine to ninety-six. |
| 52 & 53 Vict. c. 50 | Local Government (Scotland) Act 1889 | Sections ninety-eight to one hundred and one. |
| 52 & 53 Vict. c. 50 | Local Government (Scotland) Act 1889 | Section one hundred and four. |
| 52 & 53 Vict. c. 50 | Local Government (Scotland) Act 1889 | In section one hundred and five, the words from " The expression " parish " to "ninety-one, " and any Acts amending the " same ", and the definitions of the expressions "Summary " Jurisdiction Acts ", " rate-payer ", " owner ", " costs ", " rate " and pension ". |
| 52 & 53 Vict. c. 50 | Local Government (Scotland) Act 1889 | Sections, one hundred and nineteen to one hundred and twenty-one. |
| 52 & 53 Vict. c. 50 | Local Government (Scotland) Act 1889 | The Schedule. |
| 52 & 53 Vict. c. 72 | Infectious Diseases (Notification) Act 1889 | Section nine. |
| 52 & 53 Vict. c. 72 | Infectious Diseases (Notification) Act 1889 | In section eleven, the words from the beginning of the section to " or parochial office ". |
| 53 & 54 Vict. c. 11 | Municipal Elections (Scotland) Act 1890 | The whole act. |
| 53 & 54 Vict. c. 13 | Electric Lighting (Scotland) Act 1890 | In the Schedule, the entries in the fourth, fifth, sixth and seventh columns, excepting the entries in those columns relating to gas commissioners. |
| 53 & 54 Vict. c. 55 | Elections (Scotland) (Corrupt and Illegal Practices) Ac 1890 | Sections forty-four and forty-five. |
| 53 & 54 Vict. c. 55 | Elections (Scotland) (Corrupt and Illegal Practices) Ac 1890 | In section fifty-two, subsection (2). |
| 53 & 54 Vict. c. 71 | Bankruptcy Act 1890 | In section nine, the words from " It is hereby declared " to the end of the section. |
| 54 & 55 Vict. c. 32 | Roads and Streets in Police Burghs (Scotland) Act 1891 | In section six, the words from " out of the rate " to the end of the section. |
| 54 & 55 Vict. c. 34 | Local Authorities Loans (Scotland) Act 1891 | The whole act. |
| 54 & 55 Vict. c. 52 | Public Health (Scotland) Amendment Act 1891 | Section six. |
| 55 & 56 Vict. c. 12 | Roads and Bridges (Scotland) Amendment Act 1892 | Section three. |
| 55 & 56 Vict. c. 31 | Small Holdings Act 1892 | In section three, subsection (1). |
| 55 & 56 Vict. c. 31 | Small Holdings Act 1892 | In section sixteen, in subsection (1), the words from " Provided " that " to the end of the subsection. |
| 55 & 56 Vict. c. 31 | Small Holdings Act 1892 | In section eighteen, subsection (2). |
| 55 & 56 Vict. c. 31 | Small Holdings Act 1892 | In section nineteen, the words from " in accordance with " in subsection (1) to the end of the section. |
| 55 & 56 Vict. c. 31 | Small Holdings Act 1892 | In section twenty-one, subsection (8). |
| 55 & 56 Vict. c. 43 | Military Lands Act 1892 | Section four. |
| 55 & 56 Vict. c. 43 | Military Lands Act 1892 | Section seven, so far as relating to a local authority. |
| 55 & 56 Vict. c. 43 | Military Lands Act 1892 | In section twenty-five, subsection (2), and in subsection (3), the words from " may borrow in " like manner " to " 1889 ", the words "in like manner as they ", where those words second occur, and the words " under section " fourteen " to the end of the subsection. |
| 55 & 56 Vict. c. 54 | Allotments (Scotland) Act 1892 | In section three, subsection (1) |
| 55 & 56 Vict. c. 54 | Allotments (Scotland) Act 1892 | Section eleven. |
| 55 & 56 Vict. c. 55 | Burgh Police (Scotland) Act 1892 | In section four, subsections (1), (14), (15), (16), (18) and (26), and in subsection (30), the words from " (1) The duty " to " of land (3) ". |
| 55 & 56 Vict. c. 55 | Burgh Police (Scotland) Act 1892 | Sections seven to thirteen. |
| 55 & 56 Vict. c. 55 | Burgh Police (Scotland) Act 1892 | Sections sixteen to nineteen. |
| 55 & 56 Vict. c. 55 | Burgh Police (Scotland) Act 1892 | In section twenty, the words from the beginning of the section to " management is transferred ". |
| 55 & 56 Vict. c. 55 | Burgh Police (Scotland) Act 1892 | Sections twenty-one to twenty-three. |
| 55 & 56 Vict. c. 55 | Burgh Police (Scotland) Act 1892 | Sections twenty-five and twenty-six. |
| 55 & 56 Vict. c. 55 | Burgh Police (Scotland) Act 1892 | In section twenty-seven, subsection (1). |
| 55 & 56 Vict. c. 55 | Burgh Police (Scotland) Act 1892 | In section forty-two, the words from " but without prejudice " to the end of the section. |
| 55 & 56 Vict. c. 55 | Burgh Police (Scotland) Act 1892 | Section forty-three. |
| 55 & 56 Vict. c. 55 | Burgh Police (Scotland) Act 1892 | Section forty-five, so far as unrepealed. |
| 55 & 56 Vict. c. 55 | Burgh Police (Scotland) Act 1892 | Sections forty-six to forty-nine. |
| 55 & 56 Vict. c. 55 | Burgh Police (Scotland) Act 1892 | In section fifty-five, subsections (1), (3) and (4), subsection (5), so far as unrepealed, and in subsection (6), the words " by " the sheriff wherever those words occur. |
| 55 & 56 Vict. c. 55 | Burgh Police (Scotland) Act 1892 | Sections fifty-seven to fifty-nine. |
| 55 & 56 Vict. c. 55 | Burgh Police (Scotland) Act 1892 | Sections seventy-three to seventy-seven. |
| 55 & 56 Vict. c. 55 | Burgh Police (Scotland) Act 1892 | In section ninety-seven, the words " out of the burgh general " assessment". |
| 55 & 56 Vict. c. 55 | Burgh Police (Scotland) Act 1892 | In section one hundred and three, the words " out of the burgh " general assessment". |
| 55 & 56 Vict. c. 55 | Burgh Police (Scotland) Act 1892 | In section one hundred and forty-nine, the words from " out of " the " to the end of the section. |
| 55 & 56 Vict. c. 55 | Burgh Police (Scotland) Act 1892 | In section one hundred and fifty, the words " out of the burgh " general assessment". |
| 55 & 56 Vict. c. 55 | Burgh Police (Scotland) Act 1892 | In section one hundred and fifty-one, the words " levied under " this Act" where first occurring, and the words " out of " the assessments levied under " this Act ". |
| 55 & 56 Vict. c. 55 | Burgh Police (Scotland) Act 1892 | In section one hundred and fifty-four, the words from " and " they may re-sell" to "for " such purposes", and the words from" and the expense", where those words first occur, to "to be levied", where those words first occur, and the words from " and the expense ", where those words second occur, to the end of the section. |
| 55 & 56 Vict. c. 55 | Burgh Police (Scotland) Act 1892 | In section one hundred and fifty-eight, the words from " and " shall form " to the end of the section. |
| 55 & 56 Vict. c. 55 | Burgh Police (Scotland) Act 1892 | In section two hundred and one, the words from the beginning of the section, to "as herein" after provided ". |
| 55 & 56 Vict. c. 55 | Burgh Police (Scotland) Act 1892 | Sections two hundred and two to two hundred and six. |
| 55 & 56 Vict. c. 55 | Burgh Police (Scotland) Act 1892 | In section two hundred and thirteen, the words, " out of the " burgh general assessment ". |
| 55 & 56 Vict. c. 55 | Burgh Police (Scotland) Act 1892 | Section two hundred and twenty-six. |
| 55 & 56 Vict. c. 55 | Burgh Police (Scotland) Act 1892 | In section two hundred and thirty-six, the words from " and " on the security " to " general " sewer rates " where first occurring, and the words from " and " to assign " to the end of the section. |
| 55 & 56 Vict. c. 55 | Burgh Police (Scotland) Act 1892 | In section two hundred and fifty, the words " or police assessment books ". |
| 55 & 56 Vict. c. 55 | Burgh Police (Scotland) Act 1892 | In section two hundred and seventy-eight, the words from " on the security of where those words first occur, to " one " or more thereof", and the words from " And where in " to " money on the security of the " burgh general assessment ". |
| 55 & 56 Vict. c. 55 | Burgh Police (Scotland) Act 1892 | In section two hundred and eighty-one, the words "to be " confirmed in the manner " herein provided ". |
| 55 & 56 Vict. c. 55 | Burgh Police (Scotland) Act 1892 | In section three hundred and six, the words from " Provided " always ", where those words first occur, to the end of the section. |
| 55 & 56 Vict. c. 55 | Burgh Police (Scotland) Act 1892 | In section three hundred and eight, the words from " levied " under " to " 1878, ". |
| 55 & 56 Vict. c. 55 | Burgh Police (Scotland) Act 1892 | In section three hundred and fourteen, the words from " and " sell the lands " to the end of the section. |
| 55 & 56 Vict. c. 55 | Burgh Police (Scotland) Act 1892 | In section three hundred and fifteen, the words " a public " hall " to " court-hall and ", the words from " or may " acquire" to " and fitting " up ", the words from " upon " the security " to " improvement assessment ", and the words " as hereinafter provided " with regard to the borrowing " of money ". |
| 55 & 56 Vict. c. 55 | Burgh Police (Scotland) Act 1892 | In section three hundred and sixteen, the words from " The " Commissioners may from " time to time repeal " to the end of the section. |
| 55 & 56 Vict. c. 55 | Burgh Police (Scotland) Act 1892 | Sections three hundred and seventeen to three hundred and twenty-four. |
| 55 & 56 Vict. c. 55 | Burgh Police (Scotland) Act 1892 | Sections three hundred and thirty-six to three hundred and thirty-eight. |
| 55 & 56 Vict. c. 55 | Burgh Police (Scotland) Act 1892 | Section three hundred and thirty-nine, so far as relating to provisions of the Act repealed by this Act. |
| 55 & 56 Vict. c. 55 | Burgh Police (Scotland) Act 1892 | Section three hundred and forty, so far as unrepealed. |
| 55 & 56 Vict. c. 55 | Burgh Police (Scotland) Act 1892 | In section three hundred and forty-one, the words " Out of " the burgh general assessment", where those words first occur, the words from " or, " if the Commissioners" to " being established to their " satisfaction ", and the words from " out of the burgh ", where those words second occur, to " assessment as aforesaid ". |
| 55 & 56 Vict. c. 55 | Burgh Police (Scotland) Act 1892 | Sections three hundred and forty-two to three hundred and forty-five. |
| 55 & 56 Vict. c. 55 | Burgh Police (Scotland) Act 1892 | Sections three hundred and forty-eight to three hundred and sixty. |
| 55 & 56 Vict. c. 55 | Burgh Police (Scotland) Act 1892 | Section three hundred and sixty-three. |
| 55 & 56 Vict. c. 55 | Burgh Police (Scotland) Act 1892 | In section three hundred and sixty-nine, the words from " in " the same way ", where they first occur, to the end of the section. |
| 55 & 56 Vict. c. 55 | Burgh Police (Scotland) Act 1892 | Sections three hundred and seventy and three hundred and seventy-one. |
| 55 & 56 Vict. c. 55 | Burgh Police (Scotland) Act 1892 | Section three hundred and seventy-three. |
| 55 & 56 Vict. c. 55 | Burgh Police (Scotland) Act 1892 | In section three hundred and seventy-four, the words " and " take up", the words from " or for repayment " to " the " lenders thereof", and the words from " Provided always " that in " to the end of the section. |
| 55 & 56 Vict. c. 55 | Burgh Police (Scotland) Act 1892 | Section three hundred and seventy-five. |
| 55 & 56 Vict. c. 55 | Burgh Police (Scotland) Act 1892 | Sections three hundred and seventy-seven to three hundred -and seventy-nine. |
| 55 & 56 Vict. c. 55 | Burgh Police (Scotland) Act 1892 | In section four hundred and fifty-five, in paragraph (4), the words " out of the burgh general " assessment ". |
| 55 & 56 Vict. c. 55 | Burgh Police (Scotland) Act 1892 | Sections four hundred and sixty to four hundred and sixty-two. |
| 55 & 56 Vict. c. 55 | Burgh Police (Scotland) Act 1892 | Section five hundred and eighteen. |
| 55 & 56 Vict. c. 55 | Burgh Police (Scotland) Act 1892 | Schedule VIII. |
| 56 & 57 Vict. c. 8 | Local Authorities Loans (Scotland) Act, 1891, Amendment Act 1893 | The whole act. |
| 56 & 57 Vict. c. 25 | Burgh Police (Scotland) Act 1893 | The whole act. |
| 56 & 57 Vict. c. 32 | Barbed Wire Act 1893 | Section five. |
| 57 & 58 Vict. c. 20 | Public Libraries (Scotland) Act 1894 | In section three, in subsection (1), the words from " either (a) " to the end of the subsection. |
| 57 & 58 Vict. c. 24 | Wild Birds Protection Act 1894 | Section six. |
| 57 & 58 Vict. c. 57 | Diseases of Animals Act 1894 | In section thirty-three, subsections (2) and (4). |
| 57 & 58 Vict. c. 57 | Diseases of Animals Act 1894 | In section forty, subsection (1). |
| 57 & 58 Vict. c. 57 | Diseases of Animals Act 1894 | In section forty-two, in subsection (1), the words " at interest on " the credit of the local rate ", and the words from " and may " secure" to the end of the subsection, and subsections (2) to (5). |
| 57 & 58 Vict. c. 57 | Diseases of Animals Act 1894 | In section sixty, in subsection (1), the words " and the local " rate", the word " respectively ", in paragraph (a), the words from " and a rate " to " within the burgh ", in paragraph (b), the words from " and " a rate " to the end of that paragraph, and subsection (7). |
| 57 & 58 Vict. c. 57 | Diseases of Animals Act 1894 | Section sixty-two. |
| 57 & 58 Vict. c. 57 | Diseases of Animals Act 1894 | In section sixty-four, in sub. section (4), in paragraph (b), the words from " in aid of " to " rates of the county," and in paragraph (d), the words " in " aid of the police funds ", |
| 57 & 58 Vict. c. 58 | Local Government (Scotland) Act 1894 | Sections eight to ten. |
| 57 & 58 Vict. c. 58 | Local Government (Scotland) Act 1894 | Sections thirteen to twenty, so far as unrepealed. |
| 57 & 58 Vict. c. 58 | Local Government (Scotland) Act 1894 | Section twenty-three. |
| 57 & 58 Vict. c. 58 | Local Government (Scotland) Act 1894 | In section twenty-four, in subsection (1), paragraphs (a) and (d), and in subsection (2), the word " let," the words " or " exchange," wherever those words occur, and the words " the power of letting for more " than a year and ". |
| 57 & 58 Vict. c. 58 | Local Government (Scotland) Act 1894 | Sections twenty-seven and twenty-eight. |
| 57 & 58 Vict. c. 58 | Local Government (Scotland) Act 1894 | In section twenty-nine, the words from " and the expense" to " special parish rate ". |
| 57 & 58 Vict. c. 58 | Local Government (Scotland) Act 1894 | In section thirty, subsections (1) to (5), and (7) to (9). |
| 57 & 58 Vict. c. 58 | Local Government (Scotland) Act 1894 | Section thirty-one. |
| 57 & 58 Vict. c. 58 | Local Government (Scotland) Act 1894 | Sections thirty-three to thirty-five. |
| 57 & 58 Vict. c. 58 | Local Government (Scotland) Act 1894 | Sections thirty-seven to forty-one, so far as unrepealed. |
| 57 & 58 Vict. c. 58 | Local Government (Scotland) Act 1894 | In section forty-two, subsection (3). |
| 57 & 58 Vict. c. 58 | Local Government (Scotland) Act 1894 | Sections forty-three and forty-four. |
| 57 & 58 Vict. c. 58 | Local Government (Scotland) Act 1894 | Section forty-six. |
| 57 & 58 Vict. c. 58 | Local Government (Scotland) Act 1894 | In section forty-eight, subsection (2). |
| 57 & 58 Vict. c. 58 | Local Government (Scotland) Act 1894 | Sections forty-nine to fifty-three. |
| 57 & 58 Vict. c. 58 | Local Government (Scotland) Act 1894 | In section fifty-four, the words from " the expression ' municipal register ' " to " assistant " secretary ", the words from " the expression ' burghal parish ' " to " not comprised " within the boundaries of a " burgh ", and the words from " the expression ' ecclesiastical ' " to the end of the section. |
| 57 & 58 Vict. c. 58 | Local Government (Scotland) Act 1894 | Schedule II. |
| 57 & 58 Vict. c. 58 | Local Government (Scotland) Act 1894 | Schedule III. |
| 57 & 58 Vict. c. 58 | Local Government (Scotland) Act 1894 | Schedule IV. |
| 58 & 59 Vict. c. 1 | Local Government (Scotland) Act, 1894, Amendment Act 1895 | The whole act. |
| 58 & 59 Vict. c. 36 | Fatal Accidents Inquiry (Scotland) Act 1895 | In section four, in subsection (9), the words "as a charge upon " the general purposes rate," and the words from "as a " charge upon the burgh " to " police assessment." |
| 59 & 60 Vict. c. 48 | Light Railways Act 1896 | In section sixteen, in subsection (1), the words from " in the case "of a county " to the end of the subsection, in subsection (2), the words " in manner "authorised by the order", and subsection (4). |
| 59 & 60 Vict. c. 48 | Light Railways Act 1896 | Section seventeen. |
| 59 & 60 Vict. c. 48 | Light Railways Act 1896 | In section twenty-six, in subsection (5), the words from " imposed along with ", where those words first occur, to " parish, as the case may be ", the words from " imposed along " with", where those words second occur, to " assessment, " as the ease may be ", and the words " in the manner authorised by the order ". |
| 59 & 60 Vict. c. 48 | Light Railways Act 1896 | Third Schedule. |
| 60 & 61 Vict. c. 31 | Cleansing of Persons Act 1897 | In section one, the words from " and any expenses " to the end of the subsection. |
| 60 & 61 Vict. c. 34 | Municipal Elections (Scotland) Act 1897 | The whole act. |
| 60 & 61 Vict. c. 38 | Public Health (Scotland) Act 1897 | Section four. |
| 60 & 61 Vict. c. 38 | Public Health (Scotland) Act 1897 | In section six, the words from " and require answers " to the end of the section. |
| 60 & 61 Vict. c. 38 | Public Health (Scotland) Act 1897 | Section seven. |
| 60 & 61 Vict. c. 38 | Public Health (Scotland) Act 1897 | In section eight, the words " to " act as a commissioner or " commissioners", and the words from " and the Board " to the end of the section. |
| 60 & 61 Vict. c. 38 | Public Health (Scotland) Act 1897 | Sections nine and ten. |
| 60 & 61 Vict. c. 38 | Public Health (Scotland) Act 1897 | Sections thirteen and fourteen. |
| 60 & 61 Vict. c. 38 | Public Health (Scotland) Act 1897 | In section fifteen, the words from the beginning of the section to "such salaries fixed; and", the word " said ", where that word second occurs between the words "the "and "medical", the words from " The medical " officer may " to " sanction of " the Board ", and the words from " The medical officer and " to the end of the section. |
| 60 & 61 Vict. c. 38 | Public Health (Scotland) Act 1897 | In section thirty-four, the words from " on the security " to the end of the section. |
| 60 & 61 Vict. c. 38 | Public Health (Scotland) Act 1897 | Section thirty-eight. |
| 60 & 61 Vict. c. 38 | Public Health (Scotland) Act 1897 | In section thirty-nine, the words from " out of the assessments " to " 1878, for ". |
| 60 & 61 Vict. c. 38 | Public Health (Scotland) Act 1897 | In section ninety-three, the words from " as hereinafter" to " printed ". |
| 60 & 61 Vict. c. 38 | Public Health (Scotland) Act 1897 | Section one hundred and thirteen. |
| 60 & 61 Vict. c. 38 | Public Health (Scotland) Act 1897 | In section one hundred and twenty-two, subsections (1), (2) and (3), in subsection (4), the words from " out of the assessments " to " 1878 ", and subsection (5). |
| 60 & 61 Vict. c. 38 | Public Health (Scotland) Act 1897 | Section one hundred and thirty-one. |
| 60 & 61 Vict. c. 38 | Public Health (Scotland) Act 1897 | Sections one hundred and thirty-three to one hundred and thirty-six, so far as unrepealed. |
| 60 & 61 Vict. c. 38 | Public Health (Scotland) Act 1897 | Section one hundred and thirty-eight. |
| 60 & 61 Vict. c. 38 | Public Health (Scotland) Act 1897 | In section one hundred and thirty-nine, the words from " and on " the security " to " case may " be ", where those words first occur, and the words from " and to assign " to the end of the section. |
| 60 & 61 Vict. c. 38 | Public Health (Scotland) Act 1897 | In section one hundred and forty-one, the words " and on the " security of the public health " general assessments ", and the words from " and to assign " to the end of the section. |
| 60 & 61 Vict. c. 38 | Public Health (Scotland) Act 1897 | Section one hundred and forty-two. |
| 60 & 61 Vict. c. 38 | Public Health (Scotland) Act 1897 | Section one hundred and forty-three. |
| 60 & 61 Vict. c. 38 | Public Health (Scotland) Act 1897 | In section one hundred and forty-four, the words from " and " may by agreement " to " with-"out their district" and the words from " They may also with " to the end of the section. |
| 60 & 61 Vict. c. 38 | Public Health (Scotland) Act 1897 | Section one hundred and forty-seven. |
| 60 & 61 Vict. c. 38 | Public Health (Scotland) Act 1897 | Section one hundred and fifty-two. |
| 60 & 61 Vict. c. 38 | Public Health (Scotland) Act 1897 | Sections one hundred and fifty-nine and one hundred and sixty. |
| 60 & 61 Vict. c. 38 | Public Health (Scotland) Act 1897 | Section one hundred and sixty-seven. |
| 60 & 61 Vict. c. 38 | Public Health (Scotland) Act 1897 | Sections one hundred and eighty-three to one hundred and eighty-eight. |
| 60 & 61 Vict. c. 38 | Public Health (Scotland) Act 1897 | In section one hundred and ninety, the words from "or of "the Local" to " 1891, as " amended ". |
| 60 & 61 Vict. c. 38 | Public Health (Scotland) Act 1897 | In section one hundred and ninety-one, the words " and standing " joint committees ". |
| 60 & 61 Vict. c. 38 | Public Health (Scotland) Act 1897 | Second Schedule. |
| 62 & 63 Vict. c. 38 | Telegraph Act 1899 | In section two, in subsection (1), the words from " defray the " expenses " to " and may ", the words from " in accordance " with " to " borough rate ", and in subsection (2), the words from " and the town council or " commissioners thereof " to the end of the subsection. |
| 62 & 63 Vict. c. 44 | Small Dwellings Acquisition Act 1899 | In section nine, subsection (3). |
| 62 & 63 Vict. c. 44 | Small Dwellings Acquisition Act 1899 | In section twelve, in subsection (1), in paragraph (a), the words from " Provided that " to the end of the paragraph, subsection (2), and in subsection (4), the words from " in like " manner " to the end of the subsection. |
| 63 & 64 Vict. c. 28 | Inebriates Amendment (Scotland) Act 1900 | In section one, in subsection (1), the words from " in the same " manner " to the end of the subsection, in subsection (2), the words " on the security of " the said assessment", and the words from " in the same " manner " to the end of the subsection. |
| 63 & 64 Vict. c. 49 | Town Councils (Scotland) Act 1900 | In section four, subsections (1), (2), (4), (5), (7), (10) to (12) and (14) to (19). |
| 63 & 64 Vict. c. 49 | Town Councils (Scotland) Act 1900 | Sections five and six. |
| 63 & 64 Vict. c. 49 | Town Councils (Scotland) Act 1900 | In section eight, the words from " and except in " to the end of the section. |
| 63 & 64 Vict. c. 49 | Town Councils (Scotland) Act 1900 | Sections nine to twenty-three, so far as unrepealed. |
| 63 & 64 Vict. c. 49 | Town Councils (Scotland) Act 1900 | Sections thirty-three to forty-six. |
| 63 & 64 Vict. c. 49 | Town Councils (Scotland) Act 1900 | Sections forty-eight to ninety-three. |
| 63 & 64 Vict. c. 49 | Town Councils (Scotland) Act 1900 | Sections ninety-six, so far as unrepealed, to one hundred and seven. |
| 63 & 64 Vict. c. 49 | Town Councils (Scotland) Act 1900 | Sections one hundred and nine to one hundred and seventeen. |
| 63 & 64 Vict. c. 49 | Town Councils (Scotland) Act 1900 | Schedules II to VI. |
| 1 Edw. 7. c. 24 | Burgh Sewerage Drainage and Water Supply (Scotland) Act 1901 | Sections one and two, so far as unrepealed. |
| 1 Edw. 7. c. 24 | Burgh Sewerage Drainage and Water Supply (Scotland) Act 1901 | Section three. |
| 1 Edw. 7. c. 24 | Burgh Sewerage Drainage and Water Supply (Scotland) Act 1901 | Section four, so far as unrepealed. |
| 1 Edw. 7. c. 24 | Burgh Sewerage Drainage and Water Supply (Scotland) Act 1901 | In section five, the words from " Provided that all " to the end of the section. |
| 2 Edw. 7. c. 35 | Electric Lighting (Scotland) Act 1902 | In section one, the words from " Provided that " to the end of the section. |
| 3 Edw. 7. c. 9 | County Councils (Bills in Parliament) Act 1903 | The whole act. |
| 3 Edw. 7. c. 25 | Licensing (Scotland) Act 1903 | In section eight, in subsection (4), the words from " and, save " as " to the end of the subsection, and in subsection (6) the words from " For the " purpose " to " referred to " therein ". |
| 3 Edw. 7. c. 33. | Burgh Police (Scotland) Act 1903 | In section three, the words " The " Burgh Police (Scotland) Act, "1893". |
| 3 Edw. 7. c. 33. | Burgh Police (Scotland) Act 1903 | Section twenty-two. |
| 3 Edw. 7. c. 33. | Burgh Police (Scotland) Act 1903 | Section thirty-six. |
| 3 Edw. 7. c. 33. | Burgh Police (Scotland) Act 1903 | In section thirty-eight, paragraphs (1) and (2). |
| 3 Edw. 7. c. 33. | Burgh Police (Scotland) Act 1903 | Section forty-two. |
| 3 Edw. 7. c. 33. | Burgh Police (Scotland) Act 1903 | In section forty-four, the words from " The town council may " defray" to the end of the section. |
| 3 Edw. 7. c. 33. | Burgh Police (Scotland) Act 1903 | Sections forty-six to forty-nine. |
| 3 Edw. 7. c. 33. | Burgh Police (Scotland) Act 1903 | Section fifty-five. |
| 3 Edw. 7. c. 33. | Burgh Police (Scotland) Act 1903 | Section fifty-six, so far as relating to burgh prosecutors, burgh surveyors, treasurers and collectors. |
| 3 Edw. 7. c. 33. | Burgh Police (Scotland) Act 1903 | In section sixty, the words from " and the town council" to the end of the section. |
| 3 Edw. 7. c. 33. | Burgh Police (Scotland) Act 1903 | In section sixty-two, the words from " The said compensation " to the end of the section. |
| 3 Edw. 7. c. 33. | Burgh Police (Scotland) Act 1903 | Sections ninety-four to ninety-six. |
| 3 Edw. 7. c. 33. | Burgh Police (Scotland) Act 1903 | In section one hundred and three, paragraph (10). |
| 3 Edw. 7. c. 33. | Burgh Police (Scotland) Act 1903 | In section one hundred and four, in subsection (2), paragraph (a), in paragraph (g), the words from " and any expenditure " to the end of the paragraph, and paragraphs (r), (c), (v) and (w). |
| 3 Edw. 7. c. 33. | Burgh Police (Scotland) Act 1903 | In the Schedule, in Column No. II the words "Sec. II" and the words from " After " to "by special order ". |
| 3 Edw. 7. c. 34 | Town Councils (Scotland) Act 1903 | The whole Act, so far a unrepealed. |
| 6 Edw. 7. c. 14 | Alkali, &c. Works Regulation Act 1906 | Section twenty-four. |
| 7 Edw. 7. c. 27. | Advertisements Regulation Act 1907 | In section three, subsection (6). |
| 7 Edw. 7. c. 27. | Advertisements Regulation Act 1907 | In section six, subsection (4). |
| 7 Edw. 7. c. 40. | Notification of Births Act 1907 | In section one, subsection (6). |
| 7 Edw. 7. c. 41 | Whale Fisheries (Scotland) Act 1907 | Section seven. |
| 7 Edw. 7. c. 48 | Qualification of Women (County and Town Councils) (Scotland) Act 1907 | The whole Act, so far a unrepealed. |
| 8 Edw. 7. c. 13 | Polling Districts (County Councils) Act 1908 | The whole act. |
| 8 Edw. 7. c. 48 | Post Office Act 1908 | In section forty-nine, in subsection (8), in paragraph (d), the words from " in the same " manner " to the end of the paragraph, and paragraph (g). |
| 8 Edw. 7. c. 62 | Local Government (Scotland) Act 1908 | In section one, the words " and " the Local Government (Scotland) Act, 1894, Amendment " Act, 1895." |
| 8 Edw. 7. c. 62 | Local Government (Scotland) Act 1908 | In section three, in subsection (1), the words from " and subject "to" to "such committee; " and ", and the words from "but " subject always " to the end of the subsection, and subsections (2) to (7). |
| 8 Edw. 7. c. 62 | Local Government (Scotland) Act 1908 | In section four, the words from "subject to the" to "the-" principal Act ".. |
| 8 Edw. 7. c. 62 | Local Government (Scotland) Act 1908 | Section six. |
| 8 Edw. 7. c. 62 | Local Government (Scotland) Act 1908 | Section nine. |
| 8 Edw. 7. c. 62 | Local Government (Scotland) Act 1908 | In section ten, the words from the beginning of the section to " made thereunder", subsection (2), and in subsection (3), the words from " and " county or " to " general improvement rate ". |
| 8 Edw. 7. c. 62 | Local Government (Scotland) Act 1908 | In section eleven, in subsection (4), the words " out of the road " rate ". |
| 8 Edw. 7. c. 62 | Local Government (Scotland) Act 1908 | Section fourteen. |
| 8 Edw. 7. c. 62 | Local Government (Scotland) Act 1908 | Sections sixteen and seventeen. |
| 8 Edw. 7. c. 62 | Local Government (Scotland) Act 1908 | In section nineteen, the words " including the provisions " relating to assessment and " borrowing ". |
| 8 Edw. 7. c. 62 | Local Government (Scotland) Act 1908 | In section twenty, subsection (1), and in subsection (2), the words " and the fifteenth day of " April ", and the words from " and section fifty " to the end of the subsection. |
| 8 Edw. 7. c. 62 | Local Government (Scotland) Act 1908 | Section twenty-three. |
| 8 Edw. 7. c. 62 | Local Government (Scotland) Act 1908 | In section twenty-eight, in subsection (2), the words from " section one hundred " to the end of the subsection. |
| 9 Edw. 7. c. 30 | Cinematograph Act 1909 | In section six, the words from " and the expenses " to the end of the section. |
| 9 Edw. 7. c. 30 | Cinematograph Act 1909 | In section eight, in subsection (3), the words from " and the " expression ' borough fund ' " to the end of the subsection. |
| 9 Edw. 7. c. 34 | Electric Lighting Act 1909 | Section twenty-one. |
| 9 Edw. 7. c. 44 | Housing, Town Planning, &c, Act 1909 | First Schedule as applied by any enactment. |
| 1 & 2 Geo. 5. c. 52 | Rag Flock Act 1911 | In section one, in subsection (6), paragraph (c), and in subsection (8), paragraph (c). |
| 1 & 2 Geo. 5. c. 53 | House Letting and Rating (Scotland) Act 1911 | In section seven, in subsection (7), the words from " and in case of "doubt" to the end of the subsection. |
| 1 & 2 Geo. 5. c. 55 | National Insurance Act 1911 | In section sixty-four, in subsection (2), the words from " and any expenses " to the end of the subsection. |
| 1 & 2 Geo. 5. c. 55 | National Insurance Act 1911 | In section eighty, in subsection (4), the words from " Provided "that" to "Act of 1889", and subsections (12) and (13). |
| 2 & 3 Geo. 5. c. 3 | Shops Act 1912 | In section thirteen, in subsection (3), the words from " in the "case of the council of a " borough " to " special county " purposes ". |
| 2 & 3 Geo. 5. c. 3 | Shops Act 1912 | In section sixteen, the words from " and the costs " to the end of the section. |
| 2 & 3 Geo. 5. c. 3 | Shops Act 1912 | In section twenty, the words from "and the expenses" to "any " such expenses ". |
| 2 & 3 Geo. 5. c. 19 | Light Railways Act 1912 | In section five, subsection (5). |
| 3 & 4 Geo. 5. c. 17 | Fabrics (Misdescription) Act 1913 | In section five, in subsection (3), the words from " in the case of " the council of a borough " to " special county purposes ". |
| 3 & 4 Geo. 5. c. 17 | Fabrics (Misdescription) Act 1913 | In section seven, subsection (3), and the words from " Provided "that" to the end of the section. |
| 3 & 4 Geo. 5. c. 20 | Bankruptcy (Scotland) Act 1913 | In section one hundred and eighty-three, subsection (2). |
| 3 & 4 Geo. 5. c. 20 | Bankruptcy (Scotland) Act 1913 | In section one hundred and eighty-four, subsection (a). |
| 3 & 4 Geo. 5. c. 26 | Highlands and Islands (Medical Service) Grant Act 1913 | In section three, in subsection (3), the words "on the security of " any rate for any purpose ". |
| 3 & 4 Geo. 5. c. 32 | Ancient Monuments Consolidation and Amendment Act 1913 | In section twenty-one, in subsection (2), the words from " in " the case of any other county "council" to "as a borough " rate ", and the words from " in the case of a county "council" to the end of the subsection.'. |
| 3 & 4 Geo. 5. c. 32 | Ancient Monuments Consolidation and Amendment Act 1913 | In section twenty-three, in sub-section (2), the words from " and the expenses " to " general " improvement assessment", |
| 3 & 4 Geo. 5. c. 33 | Temperance (Scotland) Act 1913 | In section five, in subsection (4), the words from " and any " expenses " to the end of the subsection. |
| 3 & 4 Geo. 5. c. 37 | National Insurance Act 1913 | In section forty-one, in subsection (1), the words from " in "terms of" to "the principal "Act", and subsection (2). |
| 3 & 4 Geo. 5. c. 38 | Mental Deficiency and Lunacy (Scotland) Act 1913 | In section twenty-seven, in subsection (2), the words from " and such payments " to the end of the subsection. |
| 3 & 4 Geo. 5. c. 38 | Mental Deficiency and Lunacy (Scotland) Act 1913 | In section thirty, subsection (2). |
| 3 & 4 Geo. 5. c. 38 | Mental Deficiency and Lunacy (Scotland) Act 1913 | In section sixty-eight, in subsection (4), the word " let ", and the words from " and shall " apply " to the end of the subsection, and in subsection (7), the words " and section sixty-"two", the words "with the " consent of the Board ", and the words from " on the " security " to the end of the subsection. |
| 4 & 5 Geo. 5. c. 31 | Housing Act 191 | In section one, in subsection (2), the words from " Any expenses " to " 1890 ", the words " the like", and the words " as they have for the " purposes of that Part of that " Act-". |
| 4 & 5 Geo. 5. c. 39 | County, Town and Parish Councils (Qualification) (Scotland) Act 1914 | The whole act. |
| 4 & 5 Geo. 5. c. 46 | Milk and Dairies (Scotland) Act 1914 | Section ten, so far as unrepealed. |
| 4 & 5 Geo. 5. c. 46 | Milk and Dairies (Scotland) Act 1914 | Section twenty-three. |
| 4 & 5 Geo. 5. c. 46 | Milk and Dairies (Scotland) Act 1914 | Section twenty-six. |
| 4 & 5 Geo. 5. c. 46 | Milk and Dairies (Scotland) Act 1914 | Section thirty. |
| 4 & 5 Geo. 5. c. 53 | Special Constables (Scotland) Act 1914 | In section two, the words " and " the county police rate ", and the words " and the burgh " general assessment respectively ". |
| 4 & 5 Geo. 5. c. 74 | Local Government (Adjustments) (Scotland) Act 1914 | The whole act. |
| 5 & 6 Geo. 5. c. 64 | Notification of Births (Extension) Act 1915 | In section two, in subsection (2), the words from the beginning of the subsection to " principal " Act ". |
| 5 & 6 Geo. 5. c. 91 | Midwives (Scotland) Act 1915 | Section twenty-five. |
| 6 & 7 Geo. 5. c. 12 | Local Government (Emergency Provisions) Act 1916 | In section thirteen, subsection (1). |
| 6 & 7 Geo. 5. c. 12 | Local Government (Emergency Provisions) Act 1916 | In section twenty-two, in subsection (1), the words from " and references to the Local " to the end of the subsection, and subsection (2). |
| 6 & 7 Geo. 5. c. 43 | War Charities Act 1916 | In section two, subsection (7). |
| 6 & 7 Geo. 5. c. 43 | War Charities Act 1916 | In section eleven, in paragraph (e), the words from " and " shall" to the end of the paragraph. |
| 6 & 7 Geo. 5. c. 69 | Public Authorities and Bodies (Loans) Act 1916 | The whole act. |
| 7 & 8 Geo. 5. c. 64 | Representation of the People Act 1918 | In section forty-three, in subsection (8), the words from "Provided that" to the end of the subsection, and in subsection (11), the words from " Provided that " to the end of the subsection. |
| 7 & 8 Geo. 5. c. 64 | Representation of the People Act 1918 | In the Sixth Schedule, in paragraph 8, the words from " The " Local Government " to " word " hereinafter," and the words from " The Town Councils " to " member of Parliament ". |
| 8 & 9 Geo. 5. c. 48 | Education (Scotland) Act 1918 | Sections three and thirty-two. |
| 8 & 9 Geo. 5. c. 48 | Education (Scotland) Act 1918 | Third Schedule. |
| 9 & 10 Geo. 5. c. 46 | Police Act 191 | In section thirteen, subsection (2). |
| 9 & 10 Geo. 5. c. 60 | Housing, Town Planning, &c. (Scotland) Act 1919 | Section forty-seven. |
| 9 & 10 Geo. 5. c. 72 | Rats and Mice (Destruction) Act 1919 | In section five, subsection (3). |
| 9 & 10 Geo. 5. c. 72 | Rats and Mice (Destruction) Act 1919 | In section nine, in paragraph (b), of subsection (1), the words from " (ii) the expenses" to the end of the paragraph. |
| 9 & 10 Geo. 5. c. 85 | Mental Deficiency and Lunacy (Amendment) Act 1919 | The whole Act, so far a unrepealed. |
| 9 & 10 Geo. 5. c. 99 | Housing (Additional Powers) Act 1919 | Section eight. |
| 10 & 11 Geo. 5. c. 41 | Census Act 1920 | In section seven, the words from " in the case of a county " council" to the end of the section. |
| 10 & 11 Geo. 5. c. 41 | Census Act 1920 | In section nine, in subsection (2), the words from " and any " expenses " to the end of the section. |
| 10 & 11 Geo. 5. c. 45 | Public Libraries (Scotland) Act 1920 | In section one, in subsection (1), the words from " section eight " to " threepence, and ", and the words " as part of the accounts " of the rating authority, or ". |
| 10 & 11 Geo. 5. c. 80 | Air Navigation Act 1920 | In section nineteen, in paragraph (a) of subsection (1), the words from " and the expenses ", where those words first occur, to " general purposes rate ", the words from " notwithstanding " to " 1889 ", and the words from " and the expenses ", where those words second occur, to "of that assessment", and in paragraph (b), the words from " on the security of the "general" to "Act, 1889", and the words from " on the " security of the public " to the end of the paragraph. |
| 11 & 12 Geo. 5. c. 31 | Police Pensions Act 1921 | In section twenty-two, subsection (5). |
| 11 & 12 Geo. 5. c. 55 | Railways Act 1921 | In section seventy-eight, subsection (6), so far as relating to local authorities. |
| 11 & 12 Geo. 5. c. 55 | Railways Act 1921 | In section eighty-three, paragraph (c). |
| 11 & 12 Geo. 5. c. 64 | Poor Law Emergency Provisions (Scotland) Act 1921 | In section two, in subsection (1), the words from the commencement of the subsection to " in " that section ", and the words from " on the security " to " in " the parish ", and subsections (2) and (3). |
| 11 & 12 Geo. 5. c. 64 | Poor Law Emergency Provisions (Scotland) Act 1921 | In section three, in subsection (4), proviso (ii.) |
| 12 & 13 Geo. 5. c. 35 | Celluloid and Cinematograph Film Act 1922 | In section four, subsection (2). |
| 12 & 13 Geo. 5. c. 35 | Celluloid and Cinematograph Film Act 1922 | In section ten, in subsection (1), the words from " and the " expenses " to the end of the subsection. |
| 12 & 13 Geo. 5. c. 46 | Electricity (Supply) Act 1922 | In section two, the words " or " by a local authority ". |
| 12 & 13 Geo. 5. c. 46 | Electricity (Supply) Act 1922 | In section five, in subsection (1), the words from " (a) in cases " to " Minister of Health, or ", and in subsection (2) .paragraphs (a) and (c), and the words from " Section twenty-one " to the end of the subsection. |
| 12 & 13 Geo. 5. c. 46 | Electricity (Supply) Act 1922 | Section twenty-nine. |
| 12 & 13 Geo. 5. c. 46 | Electricity (Supply) Act 1922 | In section thirty, in paragraph (c) of subsection (2), the words from " to the Local Government "Act" to "1875", the word "respectively", and the words from " to the Local Government " (Scotland) " to the end of the paragraph, and paragraph (d). |
| 12 & 13 Geo. 5. c. 52 | Allotments (Scotland) Act 1922 | Section eighteen. |
| 12 & 13 Geo. 5. c. 54 | Milk and Dairies (Amendment) Act 1922 | In section fourteen, in paragraph (f), the words from " and any " expense " to the end of the paragraph, and in paragraph (h), the words from " Any expenses incurred " to " of that " assessment." |
| 13 & 14 Geo. 5. c. 13 | Rent Restrictions (Notices of Increase) Act 1923 | In section three, subsection (6). |
| 13 & 14 Geo. 5. c. 24 | Housing, &c. Act 1923 | In section two, in subsection (6), the words from " under Part III " of the principal Act " to the end of the subsection. |
| 13 & 14 Geo. 5. c. 32 | Rent and Mortgage Interest Restrictions Act 1923 | In section eighteen, subsection (4). |
| 13 & 14 Geo. 5. c. 41 | Town Councils (Scotland) Act 1923 | The whole act. |
| 14 & 15 Geo. 5. c. 36 | Local Authorities Loans (Scotland) Act 1924 | The whole act. |
| 15 & 16 Geo. 5. c. 15 | Housing (Scotland) Act 1925 | Section sixty-six, so far as unrepealed. |
| 15 & 16 Geo. 5. c. 15 | Housing (Scotland) Act 1925 | In section sixty-eight, subsections (2) (as substituted by the Housing (Scotland) Act, 1930), and (3). |
| 15 & 16 Geo. 5. c. 15 | Housing (Scotland) Act 1925 | In section sixty-nine, subsection (2). |
| 15 & 16 Geo. 5. c. 15 | Housing (Scotland) Act 1925 | In section seventy, in subsection (1), the words from " and that " to the end of the subsection. |
| 15 & 16 Geo. 5. c. 15 | Housing (Scotland) Act 1925 | Section ninety-three. |
| 15 & 16 Geo. 5. c. 15 | Housing (Scotland) Act 1925 | Section ninety-five. |
| 15 & 16 Geo. 5. c. 15 | Housing (Scotland) Act 1925 | In section ninety-six, in subsection (1), the words from " and the expenses " to the end of the subsection, and subsection (2). |
| 15 & 16 Geo. 5. c. 15 | Housing (Scotland) Act 1925 | Section ninety-nine. |
| 15 & 16 Geo. 5. c. 15 | Housing (Scotland) Act 1925 | Section one hundred and one. |
| 15 & 16 Geo. 5. c. 50 | Theatrical Employers Registration Act 1925 | In section twelve, in subsection (2), the words from "in the case " of the council of a county " borough " to the end of the subsection. |
| 15 & 16 Geo. 5. c. 50 | Theatrical Employers Registration Act 1925 | In section fourteen, subsection (2). |
| 15 & 16 Geo. 5. c. 82 | Roads and Streets in Police Burghs (Scotland) Act 1925 | In section two, the words from "on the security" to "Act " 1878 ". |
| 15 & 16 Geo. 5. c. 89 | Education (Scotland) Act 1925 | The whole act. |
| 16 Geo. 5. c. | Allotments (Scotland) Act 1926 | The whole act. |
| 16 & 17 Geo. 5. c. 45 | Fertilisers and Feeding Stuffs Act 1926 | In section seventeen, subsection (3) |
| 16 & 17 Geo. 5. c. 45 | Fertilisers and Feeding Stuffs Act 1926 | In section twenty-eight, in paragraph (b), the words from " and " the expenses " to the end of the paragraph, and paragraph (c). |
| 16 & 17 Geo. 5. c. 47 | Rating (Scotland) Act 1926 | Section one. |
| 16 & 17 Geo. 5. c. 47 | Rating (Scotland) Act 1926 | Sections three and four. |
| 16 & 17 Geo. 5. c. 47 | Rating (Scotland) Act 1926 | Section seven. |
| 16 & 17 Geo. 5. c. 47 | Rating (Scotland) Act 1926 | Section nine. |
| 16 & 17 Geo. 5. c. 47 | Rating (Scotland) Act 1926 | In section eleven, the words from " and section three " to the end of the section. |
| 16 & 17 Geo. 5. c. 47 | Rating (Scotland) Act 1926 | In section twelve, subsection (8). |
| 16 & 17 Geo. 5. c. 47 | Rating (Scotland) Act 1926 | In section fourteen, subsection (4). |
| 16 & 17 Geo. 5. c. 47 | Rating (Scotland) Act 1926 | Sections fifteen to seventeen. |
| 16 & 17 Geo. 5. c. 47 | Rating (Scotland) Act 1926 | Sections nineteen to twenty-four. |
| 16 & 17 Geo. 5. c. 47 | Rating (Scotland) Act 1926 | Section twenty-five, so far as unrepealed. |
| 16 & 17 Geo. 5. c. 47 | Rating (Scotland) Act 1926 | Sections twenty-seven and twenty-eight. |
| 16 & 17 Geo. 5. c. 47 | Rating (Scotland) Act 1926 | In section twenty-nine, in subsection (1), the definitions of " agricultural lands and heritages," " agricultural rates " grant ", " compensation ", " education rate " lunacy "rate", "parish council "parish rates", and "rating " authority ", and subsections (3) to (5). |
| 16 & 17 Geo. 5. c. 47 | Rating (Scotland) Act 1926 | Second Schedule. |
| 16 & 17 Geo. 5. c. 56 | Housing (Rural Workers) Act 1926 | In section eight, in paragraph (g), the words from " and any expenses " to "of that Act," and the words from "in like " manner ".where those words second occur, to the end of the paragraph. |
| 17 & 18 Geo. 5. c. 17 | Midwives and Maternity Homes (Scotland) Act 1927 | In section eight, the words from the beginning of the section to " such joint committee, and". |
| 18 & 19 Geo. 5. c. 29 | Slaughter of Animals (Scotland) Act 1928 | In section seven, in paragraph (c), the words from " shall be " defrayed " to " Provided "that" and the words "such " expenses ". |
| 18 & 19 Geo. 5. c. 31 | Food and Drugs (Adulteration) Act 1928 | Section twenty-six, and in section thirty-five, paragraph (A). |
| 19 & 20 Geo. 5. c. 25 | Local Government (Scotland) Act 1929 | In section two, subsection (2). |
| 19 & 20 Geo. 5. c. 25 | Local Government (Scotland) Act 1929 | In section three, subsection (2). |
| 19 & 20 Geo. 5. c. 25 | Local Government (Scotland) Act 1929 | In section five, subsections (5) and (7). |
| 19 & 20 Geo. 5. c. 25 | Local Government (Scotland) Act 1929 | In section six, subsections (1), (2) and (4). |
| 19 & 20 Geo. 5. c. 25 | Local Government (Scotland) Act 1929 | Sections seven to nine. |
| 19 & 20 Geo. 5. c. 25 | Local Government (Scotland) Act 1929 | In section ten, subsections (4), (5), (7) and (8). |
| 19 & 20 Geo. 5. c. 25 | Local Government (Scotland) Act 1929 | In section eleven, subsections (1) to (3), (7), (9) and (10). |
| 19 & 20 Geo. 5. c. 25 | Local Government (Scotland) Act 1929 | Section twelve, so far as unrepealed. |
| 19 & 20 Geo. 5. c. 25 | Local Government (Scotland) Act 1929 | Sections thirteen to seventeen. |
| 19 & 20 Geo. 5. c. 25 | Local Government (Scotland) Act 1929 | In section eighteen, subsection (1) to (5). |
| 19 & 20 Geo. 5. c. 25 | Local Government (Scotland) Act 1929 | Section nineteen. |
| 19 & 20 Geo. 5. c. 25 | Local Government (Scotland) Act 1929 | Sections twenty-one to twenty-three. |
| 19 & 20 Geo. 5. c. 25 | Local Government (Scotland) Act 1929 | Section twenty-five. |
| 19 & 20 Geo. 5. c. 25 | Local Government (Scotland) Act 1929 | In section twenty-six, subsections (1) to (7). |
| 19 & 20 Geo. 5. c. 25 | Local Government (Scotland) Act 1929 | Section thirty-three. |
| 19 & 20 Geo. 5. c. 25 | Local Government (Scotland) Act 1929 | Sections thirty-five to forty. |
| 19 & 20 Geo. 5. c. 25 | Local Government (Scotland) Act 1929 | Sections forty-two and forty-three. |
| 19 & 20 Geo. 5. c. 25 | Local Government (Scotland) Act 1929 | Third Schedule. |
| 19 & 20 Geo. 5. c. 25 | Local Government (Scotland) Act 1929 | Fourth Schedule. |
| 19 & 20 Geo. 5. c. 33 | Bridges Act 1929 | In section eight, subsection (1), and in subsection (2), the words from " as a highway authority", where those words first occur, to the end of the subsection. |
| 20 & 21 Geo. 5. c. 40 | Housing (Scotland) Act 1930 | In section thirty-nine, in subsection (3), the words from " in "accordance with " to the "end of the subsection. |
| 20 & 21 Geo. 5. c. 43 | Road Traffic Act 1930 | In section one hundred and nineteen, subsection (2), and in subsection (3), the words from " and any sum " to the end of the subsection. |
| 21 & 22 Geo. 5. c. 17 | Local Authorities (Publicity) Act 1931 | In section one, in subsection (1), the words from " Provided "that" to the end of the subsection, and in subsection (3), the words from " and in "Scotland " to the end of the subsection. |
| 22 & 23 Geo. 5. c. 28 | Public Health (Cleansing of Shellfish) Act 1932 | In section three, in paragraph (b), the words from " (3) Any expenses " to " 1897," and the words "in accordance with" to the end of the paragraph. |
| 22 & 23 Geo. 5. c. 49 | Town and Country Planning (Scotland) Act 1932 | In section thirty-seven, in subsection (1), the words from " and " the costs incurred " to the end of the subsection, and subsection (2). |
| 22 & 23 Geo. 5. c. 49 | Town and Country Planning (Scotland) Act 1932 | In section forty-eight, in subsection (1), the words from the beginning of the subsection to " Provided that ", and in subsection (2), the words from " in " accordance with " to the end of the subsection. |
| 22 & 23 Geo. 5. c. 49 | Town and Country Planning (Scotland) Act 1932 | In section forty-nine, the words " Any expenses incurred under " this Act by ", the word " by", where that word second occurs, and the words from " shall be "defrayed" to "and such " council ". |
| 24 & 25 Geo. 5. c. 28 | Gas Undertakings Act 1934 | In section thirty-four, the words " (given with the concurrence of " the Board of Trade) ", and the words " under the provisions " and ". |
| 24 & 25 Geo. 5. c. 52 | Poor Law (Scotland) Act 1934 | In section seven, in subsection (5), the words from " and the " provisions " to the end of the subsection. |
| 25 & 26 Geo. 5. c. 36 | Public Health (Water and Sewerage) (Scotland) Act 1935 | The whole act. |
| 25 & 26 Geo. 5. c. 41 | Housing (Scotland) Act 1935 | In section seventy-six, subsection (3). |
| 25 & 26 Geo. 5. c. 41 | Housing (Scotland) Act 1935 | In section seventy - nine, subsections (2) and (3). |
| 25 & 26 Geo. 5. c. 47 | Restriction of Ribbon Development Act 1935 | In section twenty-five, in subsection (12), the words from and the provisions" to the end of the subsection. |
| 26 Geo. 5. & 1 Edw. 8. c. 32 | National Health Insurance Act 1936 | Section one hundred and ninety-four. |
| 26 Geo. 5. & 1 Edw. 8. c. 42 | Education (Scotland) Act 1936 | The whole act. |
| 26 Geo. 5. & 1 Edw. 8. c. 48 | Health Resorts and Watering Places Act 1936 | In section One, in subsection (1), the words from " and (b) expend" to "value of the "borough or district", and in subsection (2), paragraph (b). |
| 26 Geo. 5. & 1 Edw. 8. c. 52 | Private Legislation Procedure (Scotland) Act 1936 | In section eleven, subsections (1) to (5). |
| 1 Edw. 8. & 1 Geo. 6. c. 5 | Trunk Roads Act 1936 | In section twelve, subsection (15). |
| 1 Edw. 8. & 1 Geo. 6. c. 28 | Harbours, Piers and Ferries (Scotland) Act 1937 | In section twenty-one, in subsection (1), the words from " and " the provisions " to the end of the subsection. |
| 1 Edw. 8. & 1 Geo. 6. c. 37 | Children and Young Persons (Scotland) Act 1937 | In section thirty-five, in subsection (1), the words from " and " shall not " to the end of the subsection, and subsection (2). |
| 1 Edw. 8. & 1 Geo. 6. c. 37 | Children and Young Persons (Scotland) Act 1937 | In section one hundred and one, in subsection (3), the words from " Provided that " to the end of the subsection. |
| 1 Edw. 8. & 1 Geo. 6. c. 37 | Children and Young Persons (Scotland) Act 1937 | In section one hundred and two, subsection (2). |
| 1 Edw. 8. & 1 Geo. 6. c. 46 | Physical Training and Recreation Act 1937 | In section ten, in subsection (5), the words, from " or any offices" to "their business", and the words " or offices ", wherever they occur, in subsection (7), the words from " and the provisions " to the end of the subsection, and subsection (8). |
| 1 & 2 Geo. 6. c. 6 | Air Raid Precautions Act 1937 | In section thirteen, in subsection (10), the words from " and the provisions " to the end of the subsection, and subsection (11). |
| 1 & 2 Geo. 6. c. 72 | Fire Brigades Act 1938 | In section twenty-eight, in subsection (16), the words from the beginning of the subsection to "Provided that", and in subsection (17), the words from " and the provisions " to the end of the subsection. |
| 2 & 3 Geo. 6. c. 13 | Cancer Act 193 | In section seven, paragraphs (d) and (e). |
| 2 & 3 Geo. 6. c. 28 | Local Government Amendment (Scotland) Act 1939 | The whole act. |
| 2 & 3 Geo. 6. c. 31 | Civil Defence Act 1939 | In section ninety-one, subsection (32), and in subsection (33), the words from " and the pro-" visions " to the end of the subsection. |
| 6 & 7 Geo. 6. c. 44 | Rent of Furnished Houses Control (Scotland) Act 1943 | In section four, subsection (3). |
| 8 & 9 Geo. 6. c. 33 | Town and Country Planning (Scotland) Act 1945 | In section sixty, subsection (1), in subsection (2), the words from " in accordance with" to the end of the subsection, and subsection (3). |
| 8 & 9 Geo. 6. c. 37 | Education (Scotland) Act 1945 | Sections forty-four and eighty-seven, and Fourth Schedule so far as it amends sections three, twelve, fourteen and seventeen of the Local Government (Scotland) Act, 1929. |
| 9 & 10 Geo. 6. c. 62 | Water (Scotland) Act 1946 | In section thirty-nine, the words from " subject to " to " Act " 1929 ", and the proviso. |
| 9 & 10 Geo. 6. c. 62 | Water (Scotland) Act 1946 | Sections forty and forty-one. |
| 9 & 10 Geo. 6. c. 62 | Water (Scotland) Act 1946 | In section forty-two, in subsection (1), in paragraph (d), the words from " so however " to "determine." |
| 9 & 10 Geo. 6. c. 62 | Water (Scotland) Act 1946 | In section forty-five, the words from the beginning to "the " commencement of this Act ", so far as these words relate to a local authority providing a supply of water under a public general Act, and the words from " or where the authority " to the end of the section. |
| 9 & 10 Geo. 6. c. 71 | Police (Scotland) Act 1946 | In section eleven, in subsection (4), the words from " and section " to the end of the subsection. |
| 9 & 10 Geo. 6. c. 72 | Education (Scotland) Act 1946 | In section eighty-two, subsection (3) |
| 9 & 10 Geo. 6. c. 72 | Education (Scotland) Act 1946 | In section eighty-seven, the words from "and shall" to the end of the section. |
| 10 & 11 Geo. 6. c. 27 | National Health Service (Scotland) Act 1947 | In section fifty-three, subsection (6), and in subsection (7), the words from " subject to" to "Act, 1929" and proviso (ii); the Fifth Schedule except paragraph 6; and the Eleventh Schedule, so far as relating to subsection (4) of section fourteen of the Local Government (Scotland) Act, 1929. |

== Subsequent developments ==
Section 377(7) of the act was repealed by section 1(1) of, and part XIII of schedule 1 to, the Statute Law (Repeals) Act 1973, which came into force on 18 July 1973.

== See also ==
- Counties of Scotland
- List of local government areas in Scotland 1930 - 1975
