= Licensing (Scotland) Act 1903 =

Act of the Parliament of the United Kingdom

Licensing (Scotland) Act 1903 (Note: Section 108.)
- Act of Parliament
- Parliament of the United Kingdom
- Long title: An Act to consolidate with Amendments the Laws relating to Licensing in Scotland.
- Citation: 3 Edw. 7. c. 25
- Territorial extent: Scotland (Note: Section 108.)

Dates
- Royal assent: 14 August 1903
- Commencement: 1 January 1904 (Note: Section 109.)
- Repealed: 1 April 1983 (Note: The Civic Government (Scotland) Act 1982 (Commencement) Order 1983.)
Other legislation
Amends	See § Repealed enactments
Repeals/revokes	See § Repealed enactments
Amended by	Temperance (Scotland) Act 1913; Statute Law Revision Act 1950; Licensing (Scotland) Act 1959; Statute Law (Repeals) Act 1976
Repealed by	Civic Government (Scotland) Act 1982

Status: Repealed

Text of statute as originally enacted

The Licensing (Scotland) Act 1903 (3 Edw. 7. c. 25) was an act of the Parliament of the United Kingdom that consolidated enactments related to licensing in Scotland.

== Provisions ==
=== Repealed enactments ===
Sections 110 of the act repealed 18 enactments, listed in parts I and II of the twelfth schedule to the act.

Part I
Citation	Short title	Extent of repeal
9 Geo. 4. c. 58	Licensing (Scotland) Act 1828	The whole act.
16 & 17 Vict. c. 67	Licensing (Scotland) Act 1853	The whole act.
25 & 26 Vict. c. 35	Public Houses Acts Amendment (Scotland) Act 1862	The whole act.
39 & 40 Vict. c. 26	Publicans' Certificates (Scotland) Act 1876	The whole act.
40 & 41 Vict. c. 3	Publicans' Certificates (Scotland) Act (1876) Amendment Act 1877	The whole act.
43 & 44 Vict. c. 20	Inland Revenue Act 1880	Section 44, so far as applicable to Scotland.
44 & 45 Vict. c. 58	Army Act 1881	Section 174, so far as applicable to Scotland.
50 & 51 Vict. c. 38	Public Houses Hours of Closing (Scotland) Act 1887	The whole act.
55 & 56 Vict. c. 55	Burgh Police (Scotland) Act 1892	Section 515.
60 & 61 Vict. c. 50	Licensing Amendment (Scotland) Act 1897	The whole act.
63 & 64 Vict. c. 28	Inebriates Amendment (Scotland) Act 1900	Section 2.
1 Edw. 7. c. 27	Intoxicating Liquors (Sale to Children) Act 1901	The whole act, so far as applicable to Scotland.

Part II
Citation	Short title	Extent of repeal
29 & 30 Vict. c. cclxxiii	Glasgow Police Act 1866	Sub-section (31) of section 149. In section 237, the words "be intoxicated while on duty, or if," and the word "he," where first occurring.
25 & 26 Vict. c. cciii	Aberdeen Police and Waterworks Act 1862	Section 146, the words "every person who is drunk in any street or public place, and is guilty of any riotous or indecent behaviour therein, and"
40 & 41 Vict. c. cxciii	Greenock Police Act 1877	Section 416, the word "drunk."
42 & 43 Vict. c. cxxxii	Edinburgh Municipal and Police Act 1879	Sub-section (6) of section 247 as amended. Sub-section (4) of section 248.
55 & 56 Vict. c. ccxxxv	Dundee Extension and Improvement Act 1892	Section 85.
55 & 56 Vict. c. 55	Burgh Police (Scotland) Act 1892	Sub-section (11) of section 380. Sub-section (24) of section 381.

== Subsequent developments ==
Section 27(2) of the act was repealed by section 1(1) of, and the first schedule to, the Statute Law Revision Act 1950 (14 Geo. 6. c. 6), which came into force on 23 May 1950.

The greater part of the act was repealed by section 200(1) of, and the twelfth schedule to, the Licensing (Scotland) Act 1959 (7 & 8 Eliz. 2. c. 51), which came into force on 1 January 1960.

The whole act was repealed by section 137(8) of, and schedule 4 to, the Civic Government (Scotland) Act 1982.
