= Temperance polls in Scotland =

Act of the Parliament of the United Kingdom

Temperance (Scotland) Act 1913 (Note: Section 16(1).)
- Act of Parliament
- Parliament of the United Kingdom
- Long title: An Act to promote Temperance in Scotland by conferring on the electors in prescribed areas control over the grant and renewal of certificates; by securing a later hour of opening for licensed premises; by amending the law relating to clubs; and by other provisions incidental thereto.
- Citation: 3 & 4 Geo. 5. c. 33
- Territorial extent: Scotland

Dates
- Royal assent: 15 August 1913
- Commencement: 1 June 1920 (Note: Section 1.)
- Repealed: 1 January 1960
Other legislation
Amends	Licensing (Scotland) Act 1903
Amended by	Local Government (Scotland) Act 1947
Repealed by	Licensing (Scotland) Act 1959

Status: Repealed

Text of statute as originally enacted

The Temperance (Scotland) Act 1913 was an act of the Parliament of the United Kingdom under which voters in small local areas in Scotland were enabled to hold a poll to vote on whether their area remained "wet" or went "dry" (that is, whether alcoholic drinks should be permitted or prohibited). The decision was made on a simple majority of votes cast.

== Background ==
The act was a result of the strong temperance movement in Scotland prior to the beginning of the First World War. Brewers and publicans formed defence committees to fight temperance propaganda, and publicans became unwilling to spend money on improvements to their premises in case the district was declared to be "dry". The whole act was repealed by section 201(1) of, and the twelfth schedule to, the Licensing (Scotland) Act 1959, which came into force on 1 January 1960, and incorporated the same provisions as the 1913 Act and consolidated Scottish licensing law. These provisions and the local polls were abolished by the Licensing (Scotland) Act 1976.

There was resistance from the House of Lords to the passing of the act, leading to threats to use the (relatively new) Parliament Act 1911 (1 & 2 Geo. 5. c. 13) to pass it. In the end, these threats pressured the Lords to pass the act.

== 1920 referendums ==
The first opportunity to petition for a poll on local prohibition was in June 1920. In order for a poll to be called, there had to be a petition signed by 10% of the registered voters in a burgh, parish or ward. The first batch of polls were then held alongside municipal elections in November and December, the first being in Glasgow on 2 November.

The conditions required to prohibit the sale of alcohol in an area were strict. Three options appeared on the poll: no change, a 25% reduction in licences to sell alcohol, and the abolition of all existing licences. In order for prohibition to be implemented, that option required the support of at least 55% support of voters, and at least 35% of everyone registered to vote in the constituency. However, if this option was not successful, all votes for "no licence" would be counted towards the 25% reduction tally. The prohibition was also limited. There was no prescription of the manufacture of alcoholic beverages, nor of their wholesale, or their consumption in private. Local authorities were still permitted to license hotels and restaurants, providing that alcohol was only consumed with a meal.

Although temperance campaigners initially hoped to hold polls in at least 1,000 of the 1,200 licensing districts of Scotland, ultimately there were 584 successful petitions. By the end of polling, in late-December, 60% of votes had been cast for "no change", 38% for "no licence", and 2% for the reduction of licences. About 40 districts voted in favour of prohibition, including Airdrie, Cambuslang, Kilsyth, Kirkintilloch, Parkinch, Stewarton and Whitehead. Glasgow was a particular target for the prohibitionists. At the 1920 poll, a majority of voters plumped for "no licence" in eleven wards, but due to the turnout and supermajority requirements, it was only successful in four.

== Repeal attempts ==
In many newly dry districts, new polls were sponsored by licensees at the earliest possibility, three years later. 257 polls were held, in total, the majority being a second attempt at prohibition. The next big wave came in 1927, when 113 were held, following which, prohibition remained in place in only seventeen wards. Among these was Lerwick, where alcohol remained prohibited until 1947.

Between 1913 and 1965, 1,131 polls were held under the act and the same provisions in the 1959 act, with the vast majority (1,079) held before 1930. The holding of votes continued to tail off during the 1930s and 1940s. By 1970, there were still 16 districts with prohibition, but just one or two new polls held annually, until the polling system was formally abolished in 1976.

== Subsequent developments ==
The whole act was repealed by section 200(1) of, and the twelfth schedule to, the Licensing (Scotland) Act 1959 (7 & 8 Eliz. 2. c. 51), which came into force on 1 January 1960.
