= Emily Miller =

Emily Miller may refer to:

- Emily Huntington Miller (1833–1913), American author, poet and educator
- Emily J. Miller, American conservative political pundit.
- Emily Miller (police officer) (1871–1962), Scottish nurse and police officer
- Emily Miller (wife of Joel Miller from the Last of Us)
- Emily Miller, founder of Rebelle Rally
