= James Smart (police officer) =

British police officer (1804–1870)

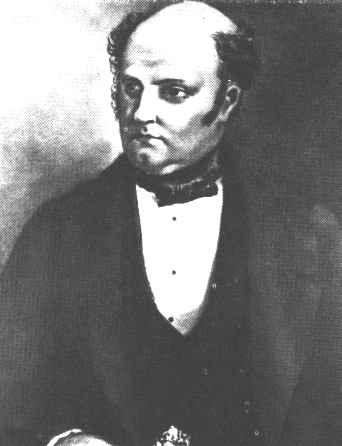

Chief Constable of the City of Glasgow Police (Note: As Chief Superintendent of the City of Glasgow Police from 18 December 1848 to 1862.)
- In office 18 December 1848 – 27 May 1870
- Monarch: Victoria
- Prime Minister: Lord John Russell; The Earl of Derby; The Earl of Aberdeen; Viscount Palmerston; Benjamin Disraeli; William Ewart Gladstone
- Home Secretary: Sir George Grey; Spencer Horatio Walpole; Viscount Palmerston; T. H. S. Sotheron-Estcourt; Sir George Cornewall Lewis; The Earl of Cranbrook; The Baron Aberdare
- Preceded by: Henry Miller (Note: Office vacant between 4 December 1848 and 18 December 1848.)
- Succeeded by: Alexander McCall

Personal details
- Born: 22 March 1804 Glasgow, Scotland
- Died: 27 May 1870 (aged 66) Glasgow, Scotland
- Resting place: Southern Necropolis
- Children: 5

James Smart (22 March 1804 – 27 May 1870) was a British police officer who served as head of the City of Glasgow Police from 1848 until his death in 1870, first as chief superintendent before being designated as Glasgow's first chief constable in 1862.

Smart served as superintendent of the Burgh of Calton from 1835 until its amalgamation into Glasgow in 1846 and as assistant superintendent of Glasgow's Eastern Division Glasgow from 1846 to 1848 in which he was praised for his handling of the Glasgow bread riots of 1848.

== Early life and career ==
Smart was born on 22 March 1804 (Note: The Glasgow Police Museum states that Smart was born on 22 March 1805 but in The First Chief Constable (1993) by Alistair L. Goldsmith his birth year is given as 1804. The book later states that he died at the age of 66 on 27 May 1870 which would make the 1804 date correct.) in Cathcart, Glasgow. He worked in England as a traveller selling tea until his employer went out of business. Smith then joined the Metropolitan Police and served between December 1830 and March 1831. Smith resigned his position and returned to Glasgow to take up employment with his old boss, who again became bankrupt within half a year of him working in the police. He became a patrolman in the Burgh of Gorbals Police in October 1831, before being promoted to sergeant in August 1832 and then lieutenant. He resigned from Burgh of Gorbals Police in June 1835 after being appointed superintendent of the Burgh of Calton. In December 1839, Smart unsuccessfully applied to serve as Superintendent of the City of Dundee Police. He retained his position as head of Calton's police force following its amalgamation into the city of Glasgow, along with Gorbals and Anderston in 1846 as assistant superintendent of Glasgow's Eastern Division.

On 6 March 1848, bread riots occurred in Glasgow leading to warehouse windows being smashed and firearms and other weapons being stolen from gun-smiths. The Glasgow Herald described the city as being in a "state of utmost apparent security" and the following day Smart, escorted by a group of pensioners armed with firearms approached the mob. The mob reportedly began to "hoot and groan" and throw stones at Smart and the pensioners. The pensioners were then ordered by Smart to charge at the mob to disperse them but they possibly misunderstood the orders and fired at the crowd instead. The riot led to three people receiving fatal wounds and four people being injured. The Glasgow Herald reported that it was soon acknowledged that Smart's "firmness had prevented the riot attaining even more formidable proportions" with Sheriff Sir Archibald Alison stating that "his conduct was not only unexceptionable but highly meritorious in the trying circumstances".

== City of Glasgow Police ==
The bread riots led to the resignation of Glasgow's Chief Superintendent William Pearce who had received complaints over the way in which he dealt with the crowds. He was succeeded by Assistant Superintendent Cameron for an interim period of 14 days before he was succeeded by Henry Miller. Miller who had previously served as Glasgow's Chief Superintendent between 1836 and 1844, took nine weeks' sick-leave after his health deteriorated before he resigned on 4 December 1848. Smart was appointed to the vacant position on 18 December 1848.

In 1849, Queen Victoria, Prince Albert and the Prince of Wales visited Glasgow on route to Balmoral Castle. It was the city's first royal visit since James VI and I visited the city in 1617 with an estimated 400,000 people cheering along the route which was well marshalled by the city's police force.

On 28 August 1850, Smart discontinued the practice of night constables calling the hours and half hours with the exception of five and half past five. On 26 May 1856, he ordered that superior officers in the force no longer arrange excise commissions so that they could focus their attentions on the prevention of illicit distillation. Smart requested that the Scottish Office produce criminal statistics from 1857 which he used to make "repeated representations to his Police Board bemoaning the carelessness of the public affecting his crime figures". The Glasgow Police Act 1862 (25 & 26 Vict. c. cciv) designated Smart as Glasgow's first Chief Constable; previously only county police officers could use the title.

Smart did not support the lighting of stairs being the legal responsibility of home owners as many did so by breaking the law and so in 1864, after unsuccessfully trying to convince local authority representatives that they should carry out the task, he flooded the police courts with 17,472 cases to prove how impractical the existing system was. Following this the board would take on the responsibility of lighting the people of Glasgow's stairs. Smart also ensured that allegations against the police were thoroughly investigated such as in 1865 when a complaint was made when a group of young boys were detained for allegedly purposefully damaging a butcher's van.

Smart oversaw Glasgow's last public hanging, that of Dr Edward William Pritchard who was convicted in 1865 of poisoning his wife and mother-in-law. The hanging resulted in a great deal of interest with Smart writing to the River Trustees expressing his concern that the "crowds of people will be very great" and warning that if people were allowed to congregate on the Hutchesontown Bridge it would result in the bridge having to be blocked off by city police officers.

The Glasgow Police Act 1866 resulted in changes to the structure of the police force through the creation of specialist departments such as cleaning, public health and lighting in which these jobs would be carried out by non-policemen instead of by police officers which had previously been the case. These changes, which would remain in place until the 1900s, meant that Smart could focus his attention on ways to improve the force which included the introduction of mounted police through the use of hired horses and policemen with cavalry experience. Additionally, he mandated that magnetic telegraphs be installed between police and fire stations.

== Death and legacy ==
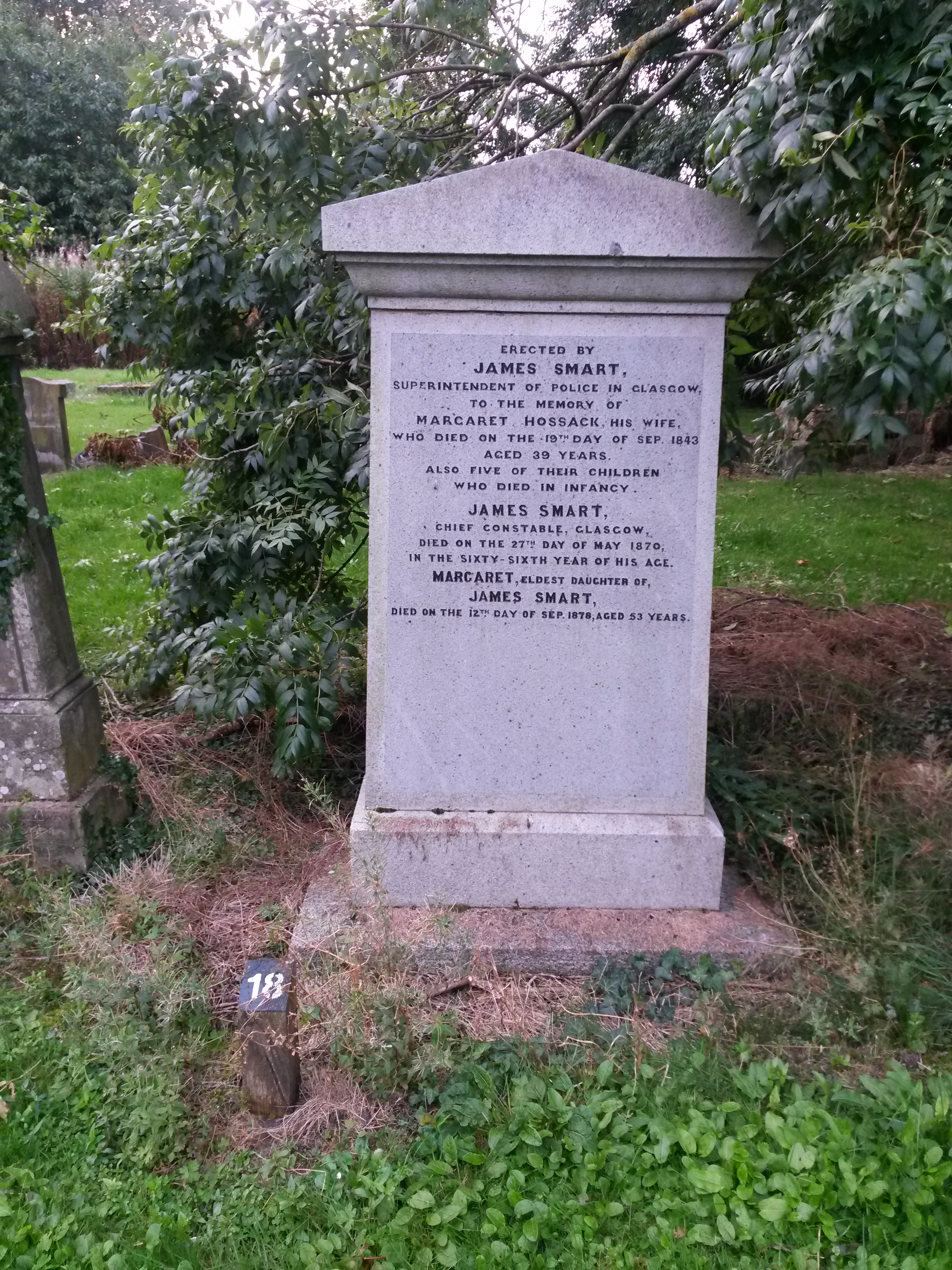
Smart's grave at the Southern Necropolis

Smart's health began declining in the late 1860s. In the middle of 1869, he was diagnosed with a "cancerous condition of the stomach” and his health had deteriorated to the point that Alexander McCall, superintendent of Glasgow's Central Division, had to deputise in his absence. Smart did not recover from his condition and died in his home at Canning Place, Glasgow, on 27 May 1870 at the age of 66. His wife had pre-deceased him, but he was survived by a son and four daughters. He was buried at the Southern Necropolis in Glasgow. His protégé McCall was the favoured candidate to succeed him described in the same report as Smart's funeral as being an intelligent and polite young man with "plenty of vigour and resources as has more than once been shown by the way he has handled notorious criminal cases". The police authority concurred with this view and appointed McCall as Glasgow's Chief Constable with him serving in the position until his own death on 29 March 1888.

On 28 June 1972, the inaugural James Smart Memorial Lecture was given by Lord Fraser at the University of Glasgow under the chairmanship of Alick Buchanan-Smith. The 2003 lecture about global terrorism was given by the Director-General of MI5 Eliza Manningham-Buller. At the 2009 lecture, Director of Public Prosecutions Keir Starmer described Smart as "one of the founding fathers of the Scottish Police". The 44th lecture was given by Cabinet Secretary for Justice Michael Matheson at the 2016 Scottish International Policing Conference. The 2016 lecture also saw the James Smart Memorial Medal being awarded to Andrew Flanagan, Phil Gormley, Paul Ponsaers, Iain McLeod, Nick Fyfe and Paddy Tomkins. The 50th anniversary lecture was given by former Chief Constable of Lancashire Constabulary Andy Rhodes on 3 August 2022.

== Sources ==
- Goldsmith, Alistair L. (1993). The First Chief Constable. Strathclyde Police.
- McGowan, John (30 November 2022). Policing the Metropolis of Scotland: A History of Police in The City & County of Edinburgh, 1833-1901 (Volume I). Turlough Publishers.
