= George Rodgers (VC) =

Recipient of the Victoria Cross

- Born: January 1829; Glasgow, Scotland
- Died: 9 March 1870 (aged 41); Glasgow
- Burial place: Southern Necropolis
- Military career
- Allegiance: United Kingdom
- Branch: British Army
- Rank: Private
- Units: 71st Regiment of Foot
- Conflicts: Crimean War; Indian Mutiny; Umbeyla Campaign
- Awards: Victoria Cross

George Rodgers VC (January 1829 – 9 March 1870) was a Scottish recipient of the Victoria Cross, the highest and most prestigious award for gallantry in the face of the enemy that can be awarded to British and Commonwealth forces.

== Details ==
Rodgers was about 29 years old, and a private in the 71st Regiment (later The Highland Light Infantry), British Army during the Indian Mutiny when the following deed took place on 16 June 1858 at Marar, Gwalior for which he was awarded the VC:

For daring conduct at Marar, Gwalior, on the 16th of June, 1858, in attacking by himself a party of seven Rebels, one of whom he killed. This was remarked as a valuable service, the party of Rebels being well armed and strongly posted in the line of advance of a detachment of the 71st Regiment.

Rodgers returned to Glasgow and died in a domestic accident. He visited his sister in order to get an alcoholic drink but was refused and told to lie down in her flat. Some time later Rodgers got up and found a bottle of sulphuric acid and thinking it was alcohol, drank it, causing his death. He was buried in a common grave in Glasgow's Southern Necropolis.

== The medal ==
His Victoria Cross is displayed at the Museum of The Royal Highland Fusiliers, Glasgow, Scotland.
