= City of Glasgow Police =

Former police force of Glasgow, Scotland

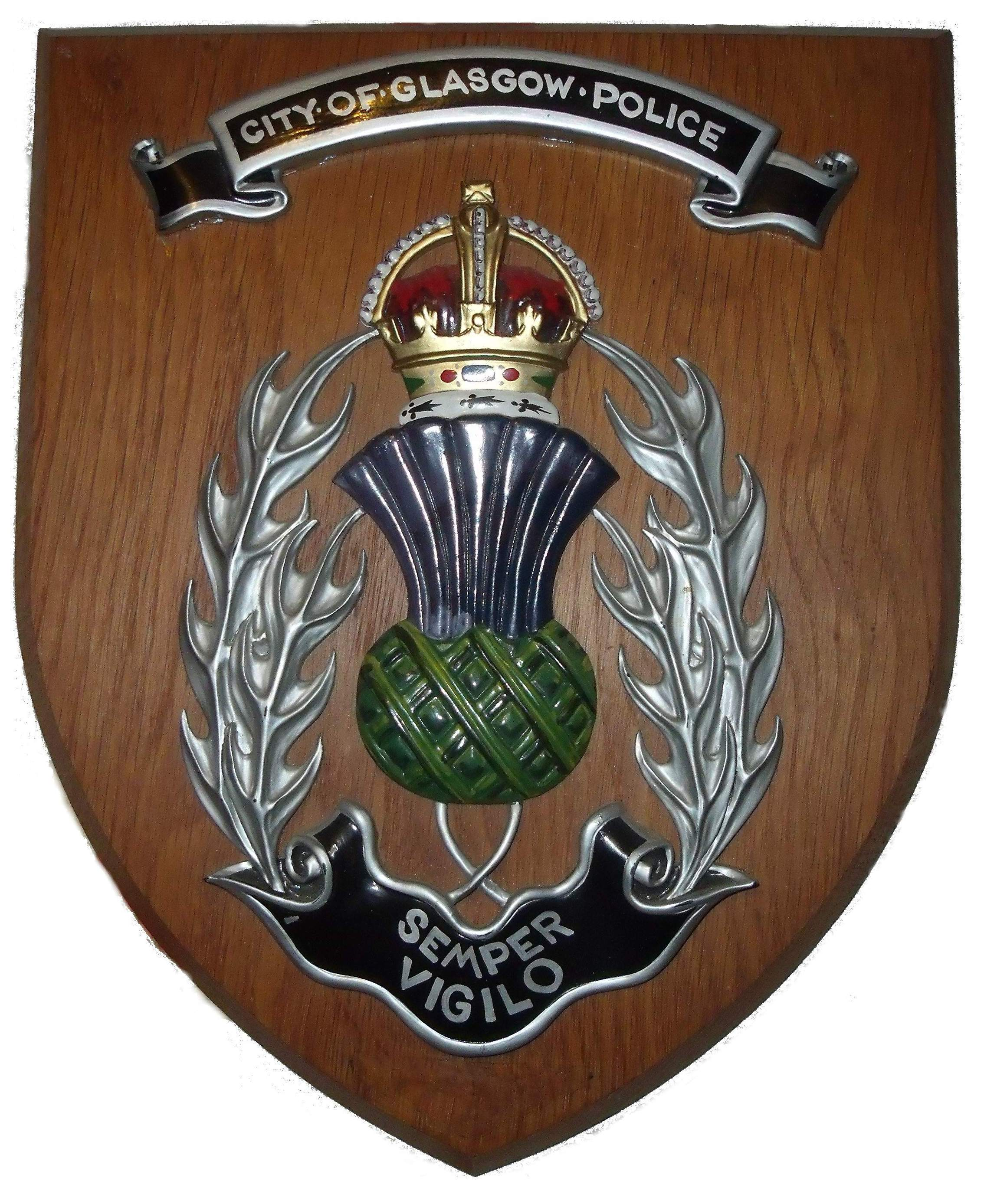
- City of Glasgow Police Badge
- Motto: Semper Vigilo

Agency overview
- Formed: 1800
- Dissolved: 16 May 1975
- Superseding agency: Strathclyde Police

Jurisdictional structure
- Operations jurisdiction: Glasgow City

Operational structure
- Headquarters: Glasgow

The City of Glasgow Police or Glasgow City Police was the police organisation covering the city and royal burgh of Glasgow, from 1800 to 1893, and the county of city of Glasgow, from 1893 to 1975. In the 17th century, Scottish cities used to hire watchmen to guard the streets at night, augmenting a force of unpaid citizen constables. On 30 June 1800 the authorities of Glasgow successfully petitioned the British Government to pass the Glasgow Police Act 1800 establishing the City of Glasgow Police. It served Glasgow from 1800 to 1975, when it was amalgamated into Strathclyde Police.

It is sometimes described as the first modern-style municipal police force, although due to the original Glasgow Police's small size and varied duties in 1779, they also fought fires, called the hours, and swept the streets, similar to the older city watchmen. This title was previously claimed by the London Metropolitan Police. However, following formal enforcement action by the Advertising Standards Authority, the Metropolitan Police gave a written undertaking never to repeat this claim again.

== Beginnings ==
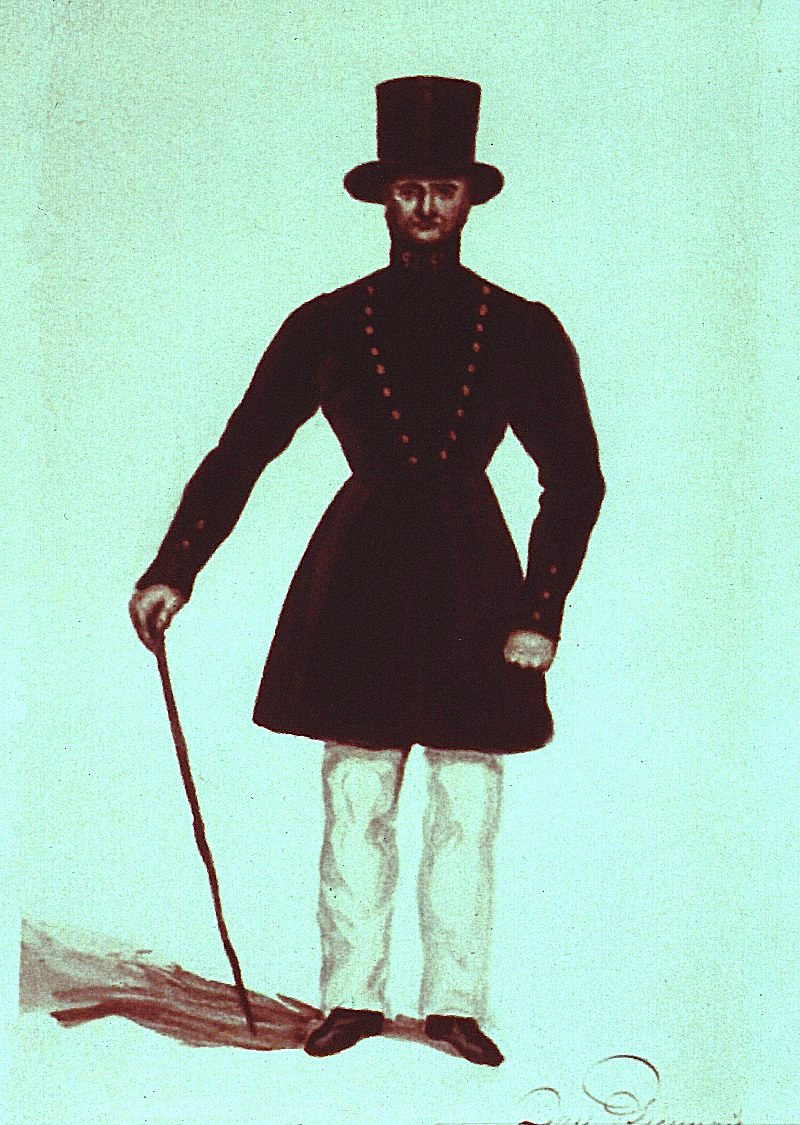
City of Glasgow Constable, 1800

In 1779, bailies (magistrates) of the Glasgow Corporation appointed James Buchanan as inspector and established a police force of eight police officers. This force failed through lack of finance in 1781. In 1788 six bailies proposed to establish a police force and obtain an act of Parliament to empower them to levy a rate from householders to finance the force.

The bailies displayed vision and innovation in setting out their proposals insisting that the force would be run by a watch committee of elected citizens, known as commissioners. The force would wear uniforms with numbered badges with 'Police' inscribed on them and each member would lodge £50 to guarantee their good conduct. The force of eight would provide twenty-four-hour patrols (supplementing the police watchmen who were on static points throughout the night) to prevent crime and detect offenders.

The policemen they envisaged would not be mere watchmen and what they had written down was the concept of "Preventive Policing", 40 years before Sir Robert Peel established preventive policing in the Metropolitan area of London in 1829. In February 1789 this force of truly professional police took to the streets.

During the following eleven years, Glasgow City fathers tried to get their Police Bill before Parliament, but without success. In the meantime, the small, pioneering, Glasgow police force, led by the Master of Police, Richard Marshall, was struggling to maintain its existence due to lack of the finance that the bill would have provided. In 1790 the force failed and the City had again to rely on a City Guard of citizens. During the summer of 1800, the Glasgow Police Bill was debated in Parliament and on 30 June 1800, the Glasgow Police Act 1800 (39 & 40 Geo. 3. c. lxxxviii) received royal assent.

== City of Glasgow Police established by act of Parliament ==
On 29 September 1800, John Stenhouse, a city merchant, was appointed Master of Police and he set about organising and recruiting the force. He appointed three sergeants and six police constables, dividing them into sections of one sergeant and two police constables to each section. On 15 November, the Glasgow Police mustered in the Session House of the Laigh Kirk, Trongate, for the first time. There were three reliefs. One sergeant and two police officers were on duty in the police office for twenty-four hours. The other section on patrol duty and the third section was entitled to rest for twenty-four hours. The sixty-eight watchmen were also there in their long brown coats with their personal numbers painted on their backs. Each carried a lantern and long stave. They would man fixed points within the city while the police officers patrolled to prevent crime.

It was from these modest beginnings that the Glasgow Police embarked on more than 200 years of service to the City.

== 19th century ==
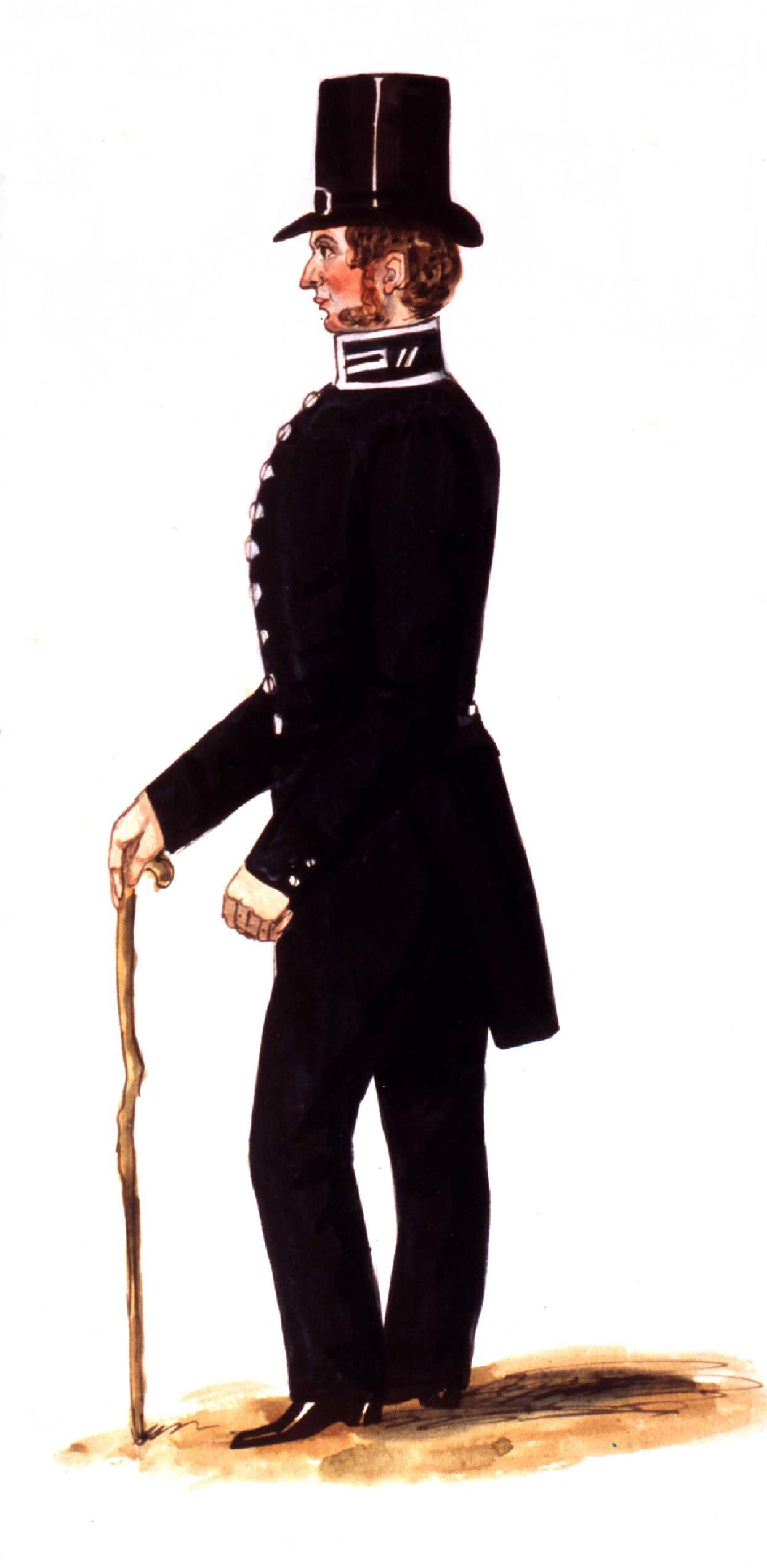
City of Glasgow Constable, 1846

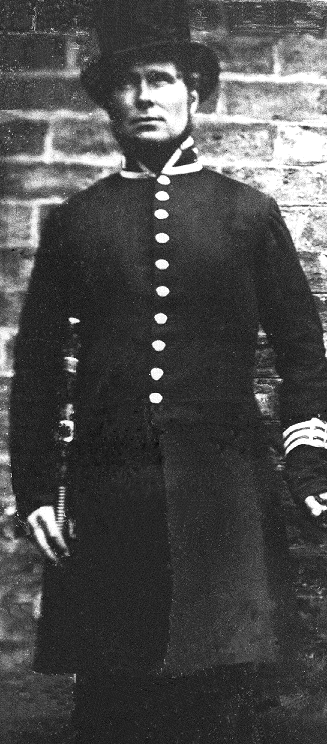
City of Glasgow Police Sergeant, 1854

In 1819 Lieutenant Peter McKinlay was appointed as Criminal Officer, Glasgow's first detective. In 1846 the Glasgow Police merged with the Gorbals, Calton and Anderston Burgh Police. As a result of this, Glasgow Police divided into four divisions and now numbered 360 officers.

New uniforms were issued in 1849, which consisted of a better quality top hat, three-quarter length dress coats with standing collar and nine buttons.

Electric telegraph adopted for communication between offices and other police forces in 1861 and in 1878, a horse drawn van was introduced for conveying prisoners.

Due to the City of Glasgow Act 1891, the city boundaries were extended to the south, north and west sides of the city. Due to the extension, a system of 14 cast iron police signal boxes was installed in the outlying areas. By 1900, the City of Glasgow Police numbered 1,355 officers and men.

== 20th century ==
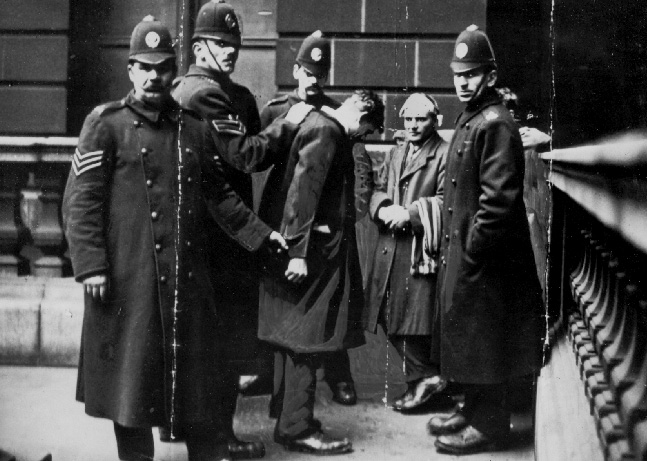
David Kirkwood being detained by Police during the Battle of George Square

In 1904 the force appointed its first Chief Inspector of Detectives, and the first Detective Constables were appointed. The Old Central Police Office in South Albion Street closed and a new Central Police Office in Turnbull Street opened as Headquarters of the Glasgow Police on 23 March 1906.

On 5 November 1912, the Glasgow Boundaries Act 1912 (2 & 3 Geo. 5. c. xcv) extended the boundaries of the city again, and the force merged with the Govan and Partick Burgh Police.

In the First World War 300 Glasgow police officers enlisted in the armed Forces. As a result, the force employed 400 temporary constables and increased the Special Constabulary to 3,000 to guard strategic buildings and factories within the City. In 1915, the chief constable ordered policemen to desist from enlisting in the Armed Forces due to the depletion of the force.

The force discussed the appointment of Policewomen and on 6 September, Emily Miller was appointed Glasgow's first policewoman. At the end of the war, of the 748 Glasgow policemen who had enlisted, 112 had been killed and a further 33 were reported missing presumed killed.

In January 1919, thousands of striking shipyard and engineering workers marched on the Corporation Power Station in Eddington Street, Port Dundas. In furtherance of their strike, they gathered in George Square on 31 January and a riot ensued, known as the 1919 Battle of George Square. The Riot Act (1 Geo. 1. St. 2. c. 5) was read but it had little effect. A night of further rioting followed which resulted in the Army being called to assist the police. By Friday night troops guarded vulnerable points in the city and on Monday 3 February, six tanks arrived (they remained, unused, in the Cattle Market).

In 1931, cuts in government benefits lead to marches by the unemployed and riots in Glasgow Green, Saltmarket, and Jail Square. Fifty-one men were arrested.

On 1 December 1931, the new Chief Constable, Percy J. Sillitoe, was appointed and immediately set about re-organising the force. Sillitoe introduced the first checkered cap bands to any officers who were then issued caps, although most constables and sergeants were still issued with traditional custodian helmets until 1952. Popularly known as the 'Sillitoe tartan', these black and white chequered cap bands were based on those featured on the military's Glengarry headress, and are now used by almost every police force in the United Kingdom, and a number of other police forces around the world.

Glasgow's first radio patrol car system was put into operation in May 1936.

In 1939, on the outbreak of the Second World War, the Glasgow Police prepared and established the Air Raid Precautions Service. Many serving police officers joined the Armed Forces. In 1942 Chief Constable Sillitoe was knighted and resigned in 1943 to take command of the Kent Constabulary. In 1945, Jean Malloy became the first woman inspector of Police in Scotland.

In 1975, the City of Glasgow Police, Lanarkshire Constabulary, Renfrew and Bute Constabulary, Dunbartonshire Constabulary, Argyll County Police, Ayrshire Constabulary and a small portion of Stirling and Clackmannan Police, were amalgamated to create Strathclyde Police.

In 2013, Police Scotland (Scottish Gaelic: Poileas Alba; Scots: Polis Scotland) – legally named the Police Service of Scotland – the national police force of Scotland – was formed with the merger of the eight regional police forces in Scotland

== Marine Police ==
The River Clyde Police were established in 1858 and were responsible for policing the Clyde up to the Tail of the Bank. They were merged into the Marine Police division of the City of Glasgow Police in 1866, and wore a small anchor on their collar. The cost of the division was borne by the Clyde Navigation Trust.

== Chief Constables ==
- 1800-1803 : John Stenhouse (Master of Police)
- 1803-1805 : Walter Graham
- 1805-1821 : James Mitchell
- 1821-1825 : James Hardie (Superintendent)
- 1825-1832 : John Graham
- 1832-1833 : F.G. Denovan
- 1833-1836 : John Watson
- 1836-1844 : Henry Miller
- 1844-1847 : Archibald Wilson
- 1847-1848 : William Henry Pearce (Chief Superintendent)
- 1848 : Henry Miller
- 1848-1870 : James Smart (Chief Constable)
- 1870-1888 : Alexander McCall
- 1888-1902 : John Boyd
- 1902-1922 : James V. Stevenson
- 1922-1931 : Andrew D. Smith
- 1931-1943 : Percy Sillitoe
- 1943 : David Warnock
- 1943-1960 : Malcolm McCulloch
- 1960-1971 : James A. Robertson
- 1971-1975 : David McNee

== See also ==
- Police
- Police Scotland
- Strathclyde Police
- Marine Police Force, founded 1798
- Glasgow Police Museum
