= Agnes Reston =

Scottish wartime nurse (1771–1856)

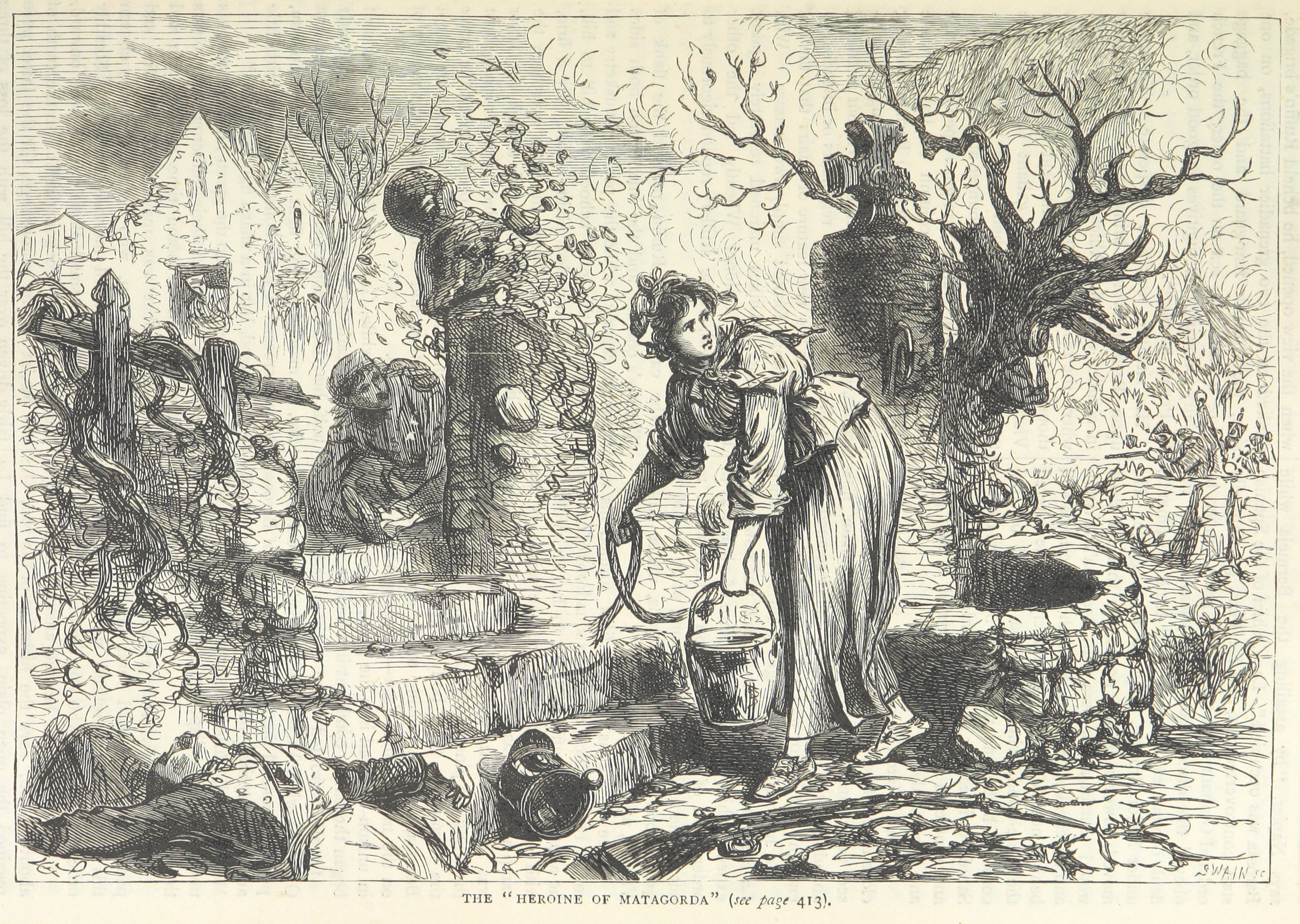
An illustration of Reston at the well

Agnes Reston (née Harkness, 1771 – 24 December 1856) was a Scottish wartime nurse during the Peninsular War. She has become known as the Heroine of Matagorda, for her outstanding bravery in an early phase of the Siege of Cádiz.

== Wartime actions ==
Agnes Reston was the wife of James Reston, a sergeant in the 94th Regiment of Foot. With their four-year-old son, she accompanied her husband when in 1810 he was posted to Spain, to the small fort at Matagorda, near Cádiz. When the fort was bombarded by French forces, she removed her son to the safety of the bomb-proof before assisting the surgeon in dressing the fast-increasing numbers of wounded men, tearing up the family's linen for bandages.

A young drummer boy, instructed to get water for the surgeon, lingered at the door with his bucket, Mrs Reston said "the poor thing’s frightened, and no wonder at it. Give it to me and I’ll go for it." Amid the dreadful discharge of artillery playing on the battery, Mrs Reston made for the well and let down the bucket. Unfortunately, the rope was cut by a shot. This did not stop Mrs Reston, who asked a sailor to help her retrieve the bucket, which she successfully filled with water and took back to the bomb-proof to continue her work.

Her attention to the wounded soldiers was described as beyond all praise. In between her nursing duties, she carried sand bags for repair of the battery, handed along ammunition, and supplied the gunners with wine and water. She refused to leave when the other women in the battery were removed to safety, and remained with the men in the now-dilapidated fort with little ammunition, until the following day brought the withdrawal of the French forces which allowed the fort to receive fresh ammunition before what remained for the British garrison was withdrawn to the fleet. After her husband's discharge some officers suggested to Mrs Reston that she apply for support. The Commander-in-Chief warmly recommended her case to the Secretary of War, but he judged he had no funds at his disposal for such a purpose.

== Later life ==
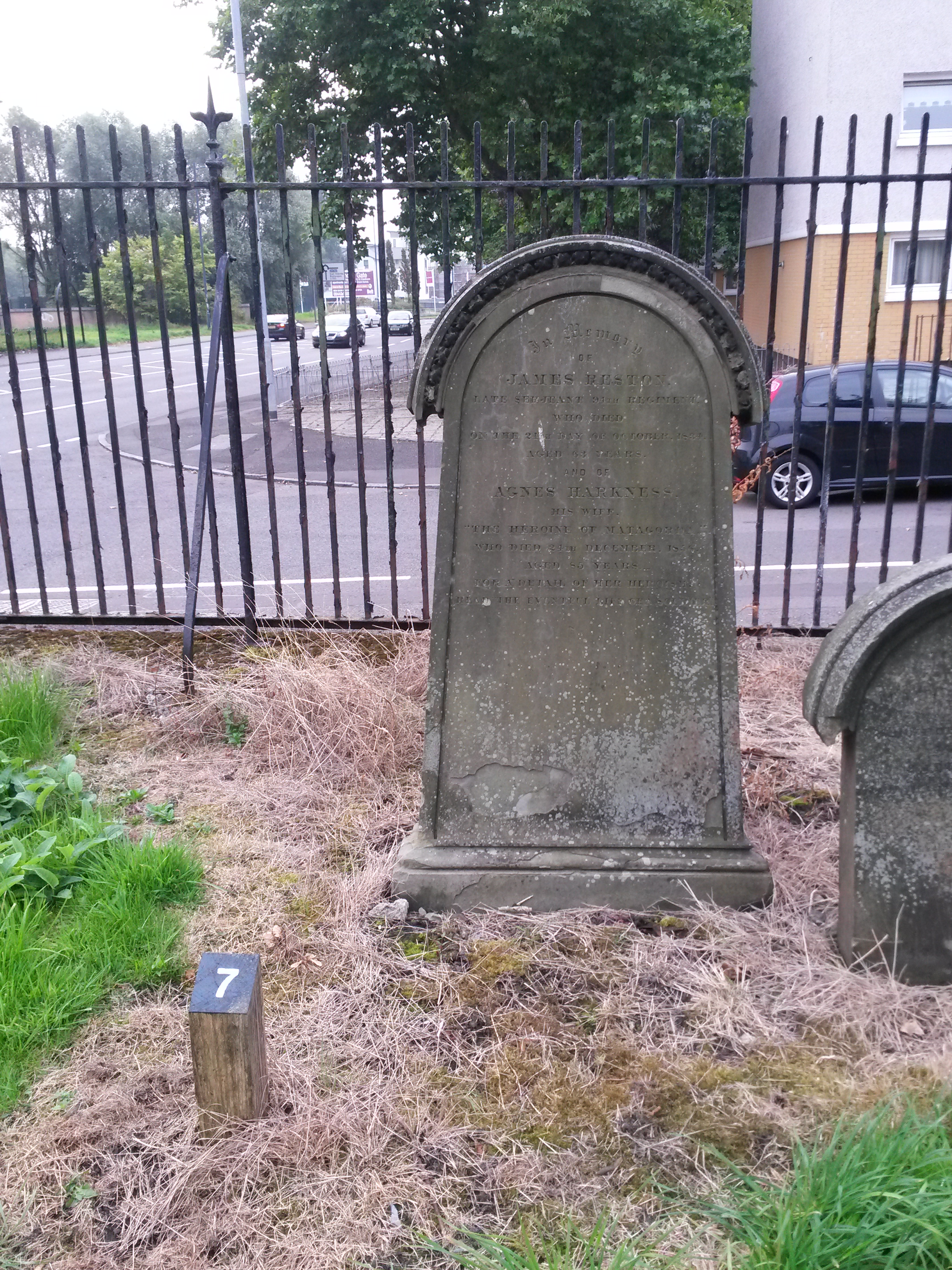
Reston's tomb at the Southern Necropolis in Glasgow

By 1844, the widowed Reston had been reduced to pauperism, and was an inmate in the Town's Hospital in Glasgow, having recently moved with other inmates from the old lunatic asylum. She was by now 72 years old, and gained a livelihood as a sick nurse. A committee of officers launched an appeal for "this truly valiant and deserving, though sadly neglected woman." Amongst the subscribers to the appeal were Queen Victoria and the dowager Queen Adelaide, although ninety per cent of the subscriptions came from the military. The collection secured an annuity for Reston of £30 a year. She was now independent, but, as her home had long been broken up, she preferred to remain in the hospital, paying for her board. After setting aside sufficient for her funeral expenses, anything left she gave to charity.

Reston died on Christmas Eve, 1856, at the age of 85, after being confined to bed for eight weeks, and was buried in Glasgow's Southern Necropolis. The gravestone stands at the north-eastern corner of the cemetery, with the inscription:

"In memory of James Reston, late serjeant 94th Regiment, who died on the 24th day of October, 1834, aged 63 years, and of Agnes Harkness, his wife, "The Heroine of Matagorda", who died 24 December 1856, aged 85 years.

The Heroine of Matagorda is the subject of A Humble Heroine, a poem by William McGonagall.
