= David McNee =

Scottish police officer (1925–2019)

Sir David McNee QPM

Commissioner of Police of the Metropolis
- In office 13 March 1977 – 1 October 1982
- Monarch: Elizabeth II
- Prime Minister: James Callaghan; Margaret Thatcher
- Preceded by: Sir Robert Mark
- Succeeded by: Sir Kenneth Newman

Personal details
- Born: David Blackstock McNee; 23 March 1925 Glasgow, Scotland
- Died: 26 April 2019 (aged 94) Glasgow, Scotland
- Spouse(s): Isabel Hopkins (1952–1997); Lilian Campbell (m.2002)
- Profession: Police officer

Sir David Blackstock McNee QPM (23 March 1925 – 26 April 2019) was a Scottish police officer who was Chief Constable of the City of Glasgow Police (later Strathclyde Police) from 1971 to 1977, and then Commissioner of the Metropolitan Police from 1977 to 1982.

== Early life ==
Born in Glasgow, McNee worked as an office boy at the Clydesdale Bank before joining the Royal Navy as a rating in 1943. During the Second World War, he served as a telegraphist on several ships, including HMS Empire Mace. He was involved in the Normandy landings on D-Day.

In 1946, McNee began his career in the police when he joined the City of Glasgow Police, serving as a uniformed constable before joining the force's Marine Division as a Detective Constable in 1951. He rose up the ranks to Inspector and served in the Flying Squad and Special Branch, until attending a senior command course at the Police Staff College, Bramshill, after which he was appointed Assistant Chief Constable of Dunbartonshire County Constabulary. In 1971 he took charge of the City of Glasgow Police, which, during his tenure as Chief Constable, was merged with six other local Scottish police forces to form Strathclyde Police. He joined the Metropolitan Police in London in 1977 as the Met's Commissioner, the first time he had served outside Scotland as a police officer.

== Metropolitan Police Commissioner ==
McNee had commanded the second largest police force in Britain in Strathclyde and was now in charge of the largest. His lengthy experience as a low-ranking beat officer in Glasgow, however, was at odds with the academic and theoretical training he had received at Bramshill in the Senior Officers's course. Determined to improve the working conditions of London's beat bobbies, McNee implemented several reforms to the Metropolitan Police, some of which would be further refined by his successors.

=== Iranian Embassy Siege ===
One of the most dramatic incidents to occur during McNee's time with the Metropolitan Police was the siege of the Iranian Embassy in 1980. McNee and the Met were praised for their response and actions during the siege, however, when the first hostage was shot, McNee immediately handed control of the operation over to the British Army, who deployed the Special Air Service to storm the building and resolve the situation.

=== Brixton Riots ===
One of the most serious riots in London of the 20th century took place in Brixton over 10, 11 and 12 April 1981. The riot resulted in almost 300 police injuries and 45 members' of the public being injured; over a hundred vehicles were burned, including 56 police vehicles; almost 150 buildings were damaged, with thirty burned. There were 82 arrests. Reports suggested that up to 5,000 people were involved in the riot. McNee considered that it was unfair for the subsequent Scarman Inquiry into the riot to concentrate on policing and not extend in depth to the wider social, political and economic context. He believed the police were being set up as scapegoats for the riot.

Initially McNee alleged the rioting was not spontaneous but organised outside the Brixton area by extremist left-wing militants; however, no evidence of a prior conspiracy to trigger the riot was uncovered by Lord Scarman. McNee was against the repeal of the sus law, believing that no evidence had been provided that arrests under that law did harm to the relationship between the police and black people. He did not believe pressure for repeal came from the law-abiding citizens of Brixton but instead from external extremists. He had earlier expressed his opinion that black people were disproportionately targeted by the sus law because there were indications that they were "over-represented in offences of robbery and other violent theft".

=== Buckingham Palace incident ===
On 9 July 1982, a man later identified as Michael Fagan broke into the private apartments at Buckingham Palace, where he spent ten minutes chatting to Queen Elizabeth II in her bedroom until he was apprehended by police and palace guards. The Home Secretary, William Whitelaw, sent his Permanent Secretary to ask McNee to take responsibility for the incident and resign, a request McNee declined.

=== Operation Countryman ===
The investigation into corruption amongst City of London Police officers and Metropolitan Police officers known as Operation Countryman occurred predominantly during McNee's tenure. McNee was very critical of the conduct of the investigation, in particular that the investigation team would not pass him evidence relating to complaints made against his police officers. Asst. Chief Constable Leonard Burt told his investigation team not to pass any evidence it obtained against Metropolitan Police officers to McNee. Shortly before his retirement in February 1980, the Chief Constable of Dorset Constabulary, Arthur Hambleton, the superior of Burt, made allegations that Countryman had been willfully obstructed by McNee and the Director of Public Prosecutions (DPP), Sir Tony Hetherington.

== Later life ==
McNee was knighted in 1978, and remained as Metropolitan Police Commissioner for five years until his retirement in 1982. He published his memoirs, McNee's Law, in 1983.

== Personal life ==
As an infant, McNee was baptized at St George's Tron Church in Glasgow and became a committed Christian in his early teens. Retaining a strong Christian faith throughout his life, he was a member of the Church of Scotland and was on close terms with the minister of Saint George's Tron, the Rev Tom Allan, a leading figure in the Scottish evangelical movement of the mid-20th century. An active freemason, McNee served as the President of Glasgow Battalion, The Boys' Brigade between 1984 and 1987.

McNee married Isabel Clayton Hopkins (later Isabel, Lady McNee) in 1952. They had one daughter. In his memoirs, McNee said of his wife: "During our marriage Isabel always put my needs as a police officer first. She has never failed me." Like her husband, she was a devout Christian, and was involved in several charitable endeavours. In her later years, Isabel suffered from various blood disorders, and she died of leukaemia in 1997.

In 2002, aged 77, McNee married Lillian Campbell, 56, the widow of a close friend, Norman Campbell, who had died the previous year.

McNee died at his home, aged 94.

== Publications ==
- McNee, David (1983). McNee's Law: The Memoirs Of Sir David McNee, Five Critical Years At The Metropolitan Police. London: Collins. ISBN 0-00-217007-8.

Police appointments
Preceded by James A Robertson	Chief Constable of the City of Glasgow Police; 1971-1975	None; Glasgow constabulary merged into Strathclyde Police
Preceded by Sir Robert Mark	Commissioner of Police of the Metropolis; 1977–1982	Succeeded by Sir Kenneth Newman
