= Glasgow Police Museum =

Museum in Glasgow, Scotland, United Kingdom

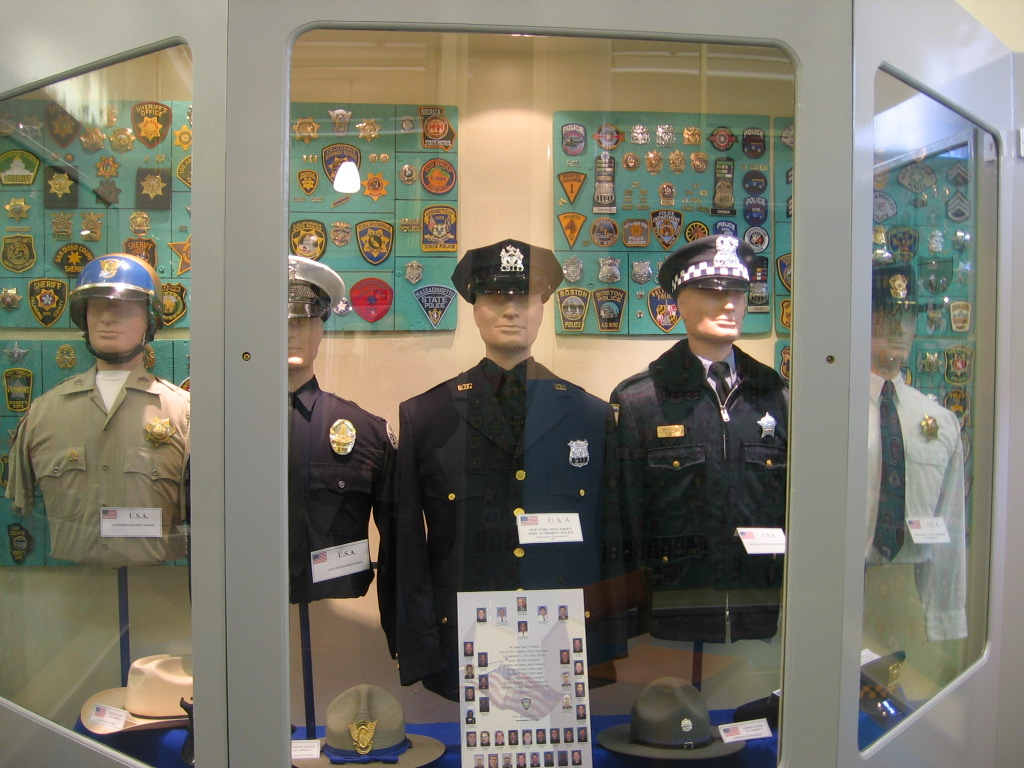
- Police Museum, Glasgow
- Established: 2002
- Location: 30 Bell Street, Merchant Ciy, Glasgow
- Coordinates: 55.8580°N 4.2449°W
- Type: Law enforcement
- Visitors: between 9000 and 10000 (2019)
- Director: Alastair Dinsmor
- Website: https://www.policemuseum.org.uk/

The Glasgow Police Museum is an independent museum in the Scottish city of Glasgow. The museum opened in 2002 at the Glasgow Central Police Headquarters, before it was relocated to the Merchant City area of the city in 2009. The museum is dedicated to the history of the City of Glasgow Police, the United Kingdom's first modern-style municipal police force. It also displays a collection of over 2000 international police insignia and uniforms.

== History ==
The museum was created by the Glasgow Police Heritage Society, a group of retired police officers from the former City of Glasgow Police. The Society had helped establish the Strathclyde Police Museum, but as this collection was not open to the public, it decided to open a museum that was free for the public in 2002 so that it could share the history of the city and country's first police force. In 2008, after the closing of the Central Police office where the museum was housed, the museum was moved to a repurposed office building on Bell Street.

== Collection ==
=== The Glasgow Police Historical Exhibition ===
The museum describes the city's history with crime and the creation of the City of Glasgow Police in 1800 following the Glasgow Police Act, until it was merged into the Strathclyde Police in 1975. This history is shared via various artifacts that detail the people and events that contributed to the creation and development of the police force, such as official government documentation, newspaper articles, images, photographs and fictional texts, uniforms, weapons and other policing-related objects.

=== The International Police Exhibition ===
The museum also contains a large collection of over 2000 items of police insignia, headgear and uniform from around the world. Part of this collection was donated to the museum by one of its curators, Alastair Dinsmor, who is currently the chairman of the Glasgow Police Heritage Society. His personal collection contains over 6400 items every country in the world, for which he was made an M.B.E. by Queen Elizabeth II in 2016 for his services to Police Heritage. Other elements in the collection were gifted to the museum by visitors, or are on loan from other museums.

== Gallery ==
Selected public domain works, provided by the museum's online portal

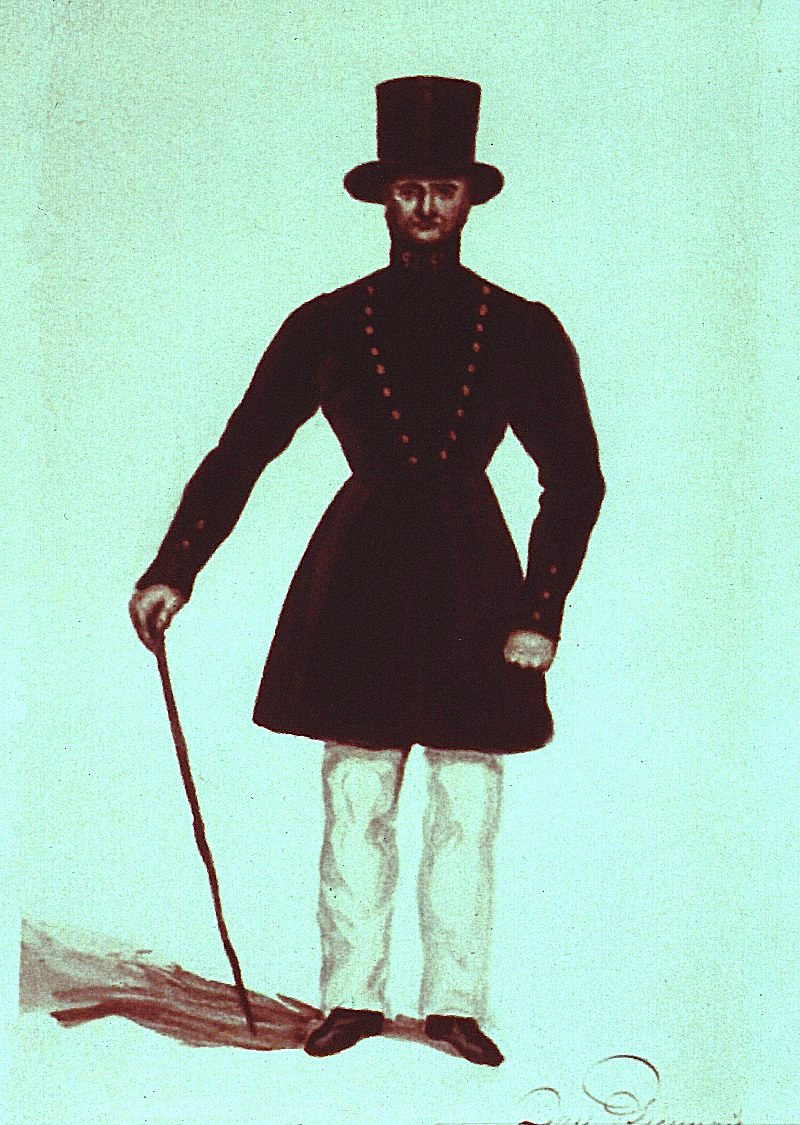
Unknown, Glasgow Police, 1800

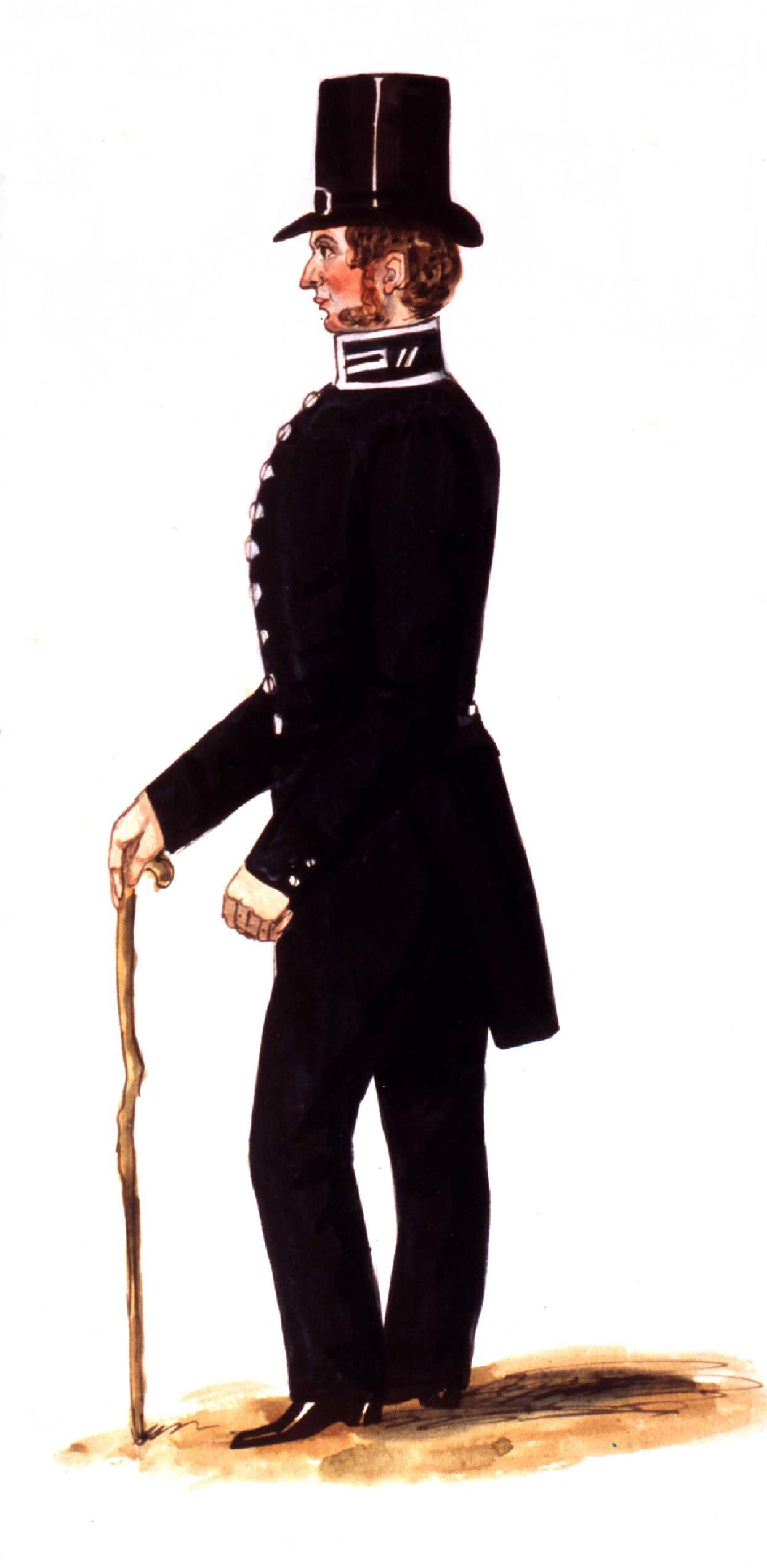
Unknown, City of Glasgow Constable, 1846

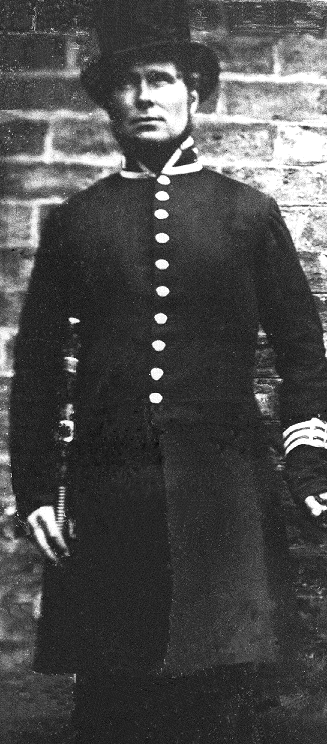
Unknown, Glasgow Police Sergeant, 1854

== See also ==
- City of Glasgow Police
- Strathclyde Police
- Police Scotland
