= Southern Necropolis =

Cemetery in Glasgow City, Scotland

Coordinates: 55°50′37″N 4°14′49″W

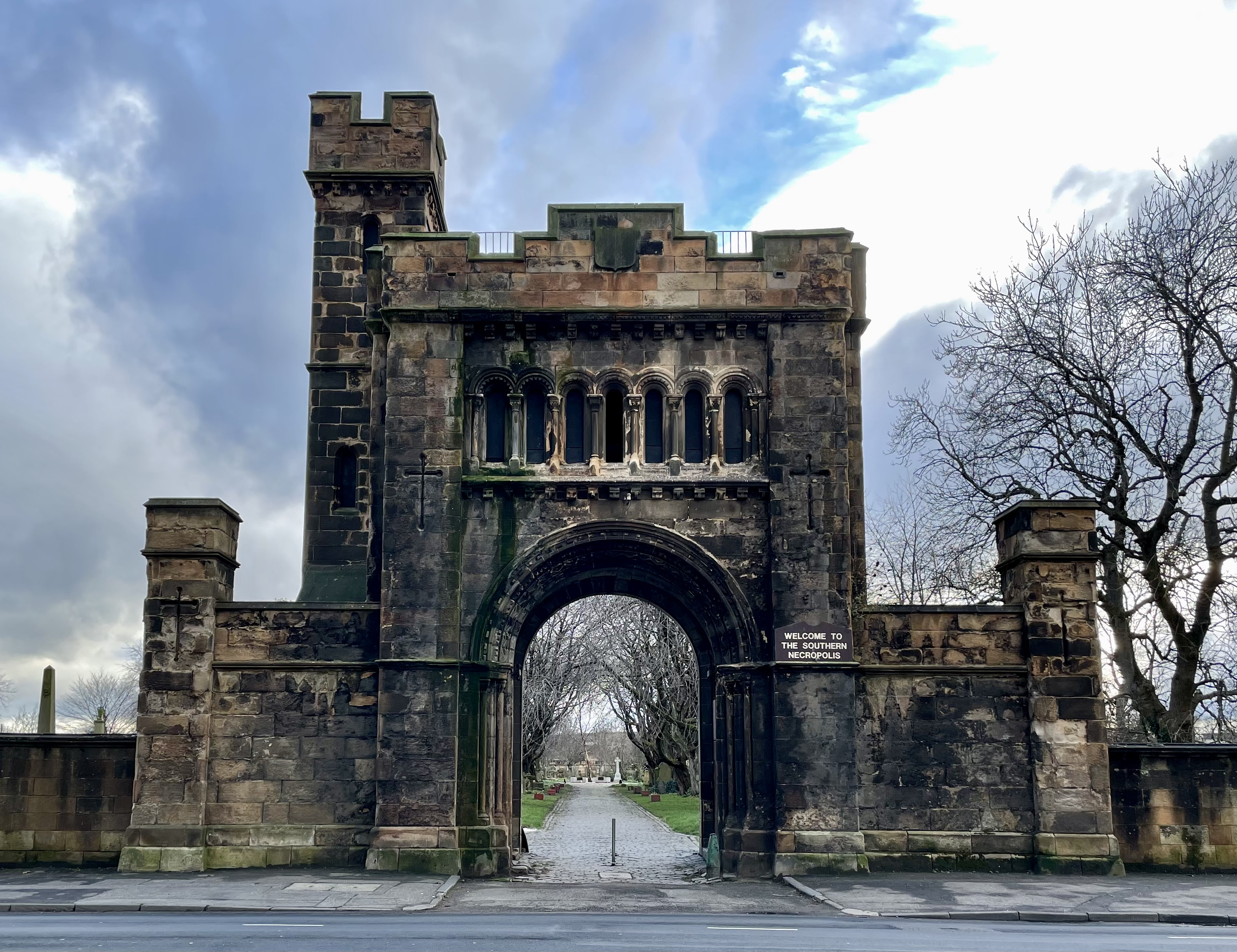
- Gatehouse of the Southern Necropolis
- Interactive map of Southern Necropolis

Details
- Established: 1840
- Location: Gorbals district, Glasgow
- Country: Scotland
- Type: Public
- No. of interments: 250,000
- Find a Grave: Southern Necropolis

The Southern Necropolis is a cemetery in the Gorbals district of southern Glasgow, Scotland. It was opened in the year 1840 to provide an affordable and respectable place of burial for the people of Gorbals and the surrounding areas of the city of Glasgow. Over 250,000 individuals have been buried within the many lairs.

== History ==
The cemetery was established in response to the crowded state of the Old Gorbals Burial Ground, on Rutherglen Road. Proposals for a new cemetery were put forward in 1839, and the following year land was purchased from William Gilmour of Oatlands. The first burial, that of a 16-month-old child, took place on 21 July 1840. There are three sections to the cemetery: Central opened in 1840; Eastern opened in 1846; and the larger Western section opened in 1850. The entrance to the cemetery is at Caledonia Road, via the grand gatehouse which was built in 1848 to designs by the Glasgow architect Charles Wilson.

In 1954 the cemetery played host to a large group of child "vampire hunters" searching for the purported "Gorbals Vampire". The incident, sparked by an urban myth that a vampire had killed two local children, was blamed on American horror comics such as Tales from the Crypt, despite none of the comics referring to the creature in question, and the ensuing moral panic led to an increase in comic censorship. In 2016, a mural which features the vampire and a brief line describing the 1950s event was created by Ella Bryson and Art Pistol. It is located in an archway on St Luke's Place, not far from Glasgow's Citizen Theatre in the Gorbals.

The Southern Necropolis was taken over by the Glasgow Corporation in 1952, and is now operated by Glasgow City Council. The cemetery is protected as a Category B listed building, while the gate lodge is listed at Category A.

== Notable interments ==
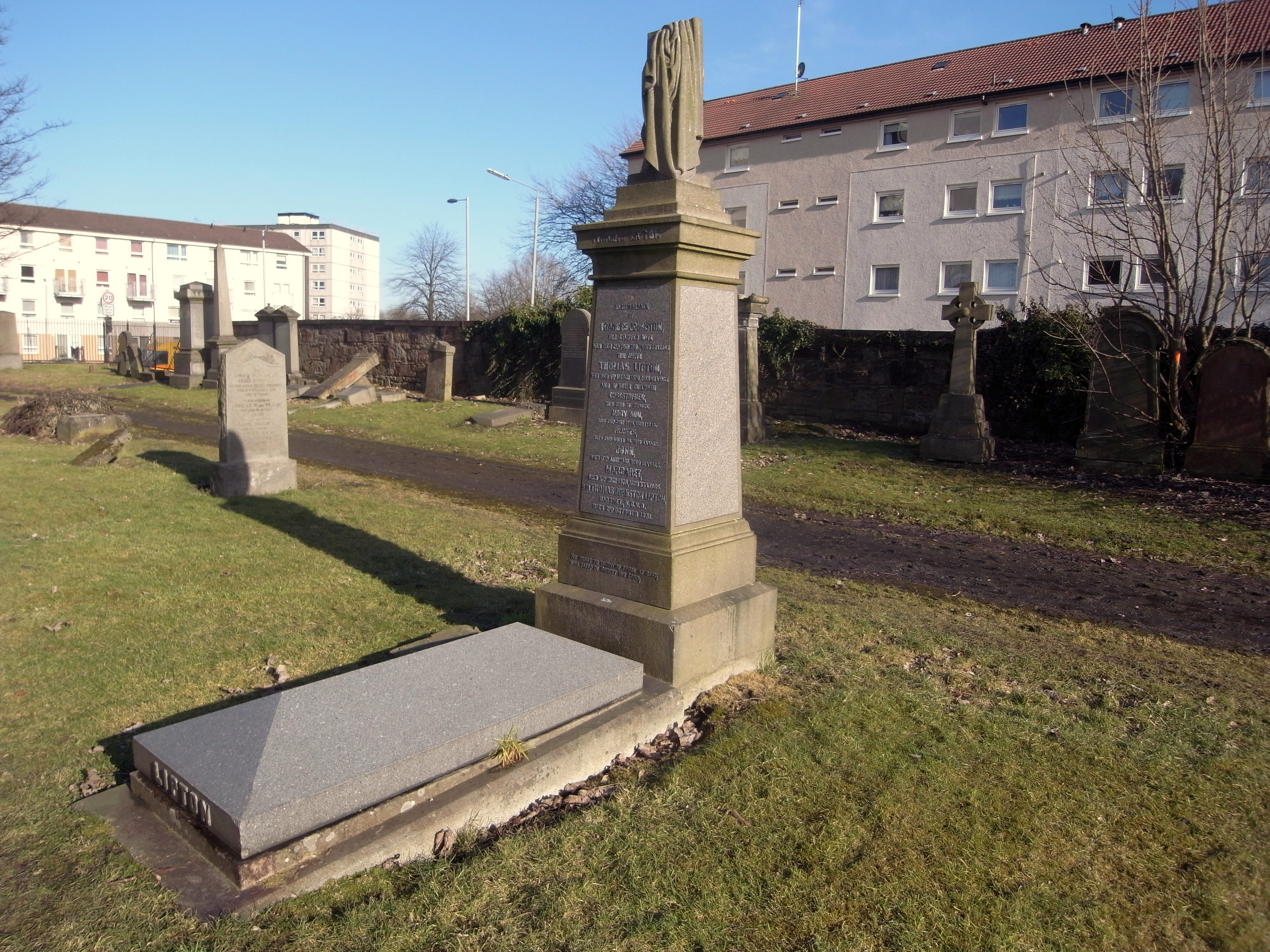
Sir Thomas Lipton's grave

- Sir Thomas Lipton (d. 1931), tea merchant
- Agnes Reston (d. 1856), wartime nurse
- John Robertson (d. 1987), Labour politician
- George Rodgers (d. 1870), Victoria Cross recipient
- James Smart (d. 1870), Chief Constable of Glasgow
- Nathaniel Paterson (d. 1871), Clergy, Moderator of General Assembly of the Free Church of Scotland 1850.
- Alexander "Greek" Thomson (d. 1875), architect
- Charles Wilson (d. 1863), architect
- Thomas B. Seath (d. 1903), shipbuilder
- Allan Glen (d. 1850), philanthropist

== War graves ==
The Necropolis contains graves of 27 Commonwealth service personnel from both World Wars, registered and maintained by the Commonwealth War Graves Commission.

== See also ==
- Burials at the Southern Necropolis
- Glasgow Necropolis, another large cemetery in the city centre
