= Emily Miller (police officer) =

Nurse and police officer (1871–1962)

- Born: 10 March 1871; Govan, Scotland
- Died: 10 March 1962 (aged 91); Newton Mearns, Scotland
- Parent(s): Ann Gallagher and John Millar

Emily Miller (10 March 1871 –10 March 1962) was a Scottish nurse and police officer.

== Early life ==
Emily Miller was born in Govan. Her parents were Ann Gallagher, and John Miller, a cabinetmaker.

== Career ==
Miller worked as a nurse in the Glasgow Royal Infirmary and Greenock Poorhouse and Asylum. She carried out investigations for the National Vigilance Association between 1910 and 1915. In September 1915, she was employed as an officer by the City of Glasgow Police, the first woman to hold this position. She was employed to take statements from women and children who had been sexually assaulted, or witnessed the same.

In 1920, alongside fellow police officer Jean Thomson, she gave evidence to the Departmental Committee on the Employment of Women on Police Duties. They argued that female officer should be given the same pay, pensions rights, and powers of arrest as men.

Miller left the police force in 1924.

She died in Newton Mearns.
