= Glasgow Police Act 1800 =

Act of the Parliament of Great Britain

Glasgow City Extension and Improvement Act 1800
- Act of Parliament
- Parliament of Great Britain
- Long title: An Act for extending the Royalty of the City of Glasgow over certain adjacent Lands; for paving, lighting, and cleansing the Streets; for regulating the Police, and appointing Officers and Watchmen; for dividing the City into Wards, and appointing Commissioners; and for raising Funds, and for giving certain Powers to the Magistrates and Council, and Town and Dean of Guild Courts, for the above and other Purposes.
- Citation: 39 & 40 Geo. 3. c. lxxxviii
- Territorial extent: Great Britain

Dates
- Royal assent: 30 June 1800
- Commencement: 30 June 1800 (Note: The Acts of Parliament (Commencement) Act 1793.)
Other legislation
Amended by	Glasgow Improvement Act 1820; Police in Glasgow Act 1837; Police in Glasgow Act 1843; Glasgow City Act 1846
Relates to	Glasgow City Extension and Improvement Act 1807; Police (Scotland) Act 1850; General Police and Improvement (Scotland) Act 1862

Status: Amended

Text of statute as originally enacted

Text of the Glasgow City Extension and Improvement Act 1800 as in force today (including any amendments) within the United Kingdom, from legislation.gov.uk.

The Glasgow Police Act 1800 (39 & 40 Geo. 3. c. lxxxviii) is an act of the Parliament of Great Britain, which established a professional police force for the city of Glasgow. Under the act, this police force was placed under the control of the Lord Provost, three magistrates and nine elected commissioners. The force was supported financially by a rate levied by the City Council on houses and businesses; the lack of such a levy had frustrated the previous attempt at having a professional police presence in the city.

The act was a forerunner of similar acts of Parliament establishing police forces in other Scottish cities and burghs, culminating in the Police (Scotland) Act 1850 (13 & 14 Vict. c. 33) and the General Police and Improvement (Scotland) Act 1862 (25 & 26 Vict. c. 101).

As well as making provision for the establishment of a police force, the act also authorised the annexation of ninety-six acres of land surrounding the city.
