= Statute Law Revision Act 1873 =

Act of the Parliament of the United Kingdom

Statute Law Revision Act 1873 (Note: Section 2.)
- Act of Parliament
- Parliament of the United Kingdom
- Long title: An Act for further promoting the Revision of the Statute Law by repealing certain Enactments which have ceased to be in force or have become unnecessary.
- Citation: 36 & 37 Vict. c. 91
- Introduced by: John Coleridge MP (Commons); William Wood, 1st Baron Hatherley (Lords)
- Territorial extent: United Kingdom

Dates
- Royal assent: 5 August 1873
- Commencement: 5 August 1873 (Note: Under the Acts of Parliament (Commencement) Act 1793.)
Other legislation
Amends	See § Repealed enactments
Repeals/revokes	See § Repealed enactments
Amended by	Statute Law Revision Act 1878; Statute Law Revision Act 1898
Relates to	Repeal of Obsolete Statutes Act 1856; See Statute Law Revision Act

Status: Partially repealed

History of passage through Parliament

Records of Parliamentary debate relating to the statute from Hansard

Text of statute as originally enacted

The Statute Law Revision Act 1873 (36 & 37 Vict. c. 91) is an act of the Parliament of the United Kingdom that repealed enactments from 1742 to 1830 which had ceased to be in force or had become unnecessary. The act was intended, in particular, to facilitate the preparation of the revised edition of the statutes, which was then in progress.

Section 2 of the Statute Law Revision Act 1874 (37 & 38 Vict. c. 35) provided that the Criminal Costs (Dublin) Act 1815 (55 Geo. 3. c. 91), which had been repealed by the 1873 act, was revived so far as it related to the county of the city of Dublin.

Section 3 of the Statute Law Revision Act 1875 (38 & 39 Vict. c. 66) provided that section 25 of the Licensing (Scotland) Act 1828 (9 Geo. 4. c. 58), which had been repealed by the 1873 act, was revived as from the date of its repeal. It further stated that all proceedings taken under that section since its repeal would be deemed as valid and effective as if the section had never been repealed.

Section 2 of, and schedule 2 to, the Statute Law Revision Act 1878 (41 & 42 Vict. c. 79) revived several acts repealed by the 1873 act, including:

- Licensing (Scotland) Act 1828 (9 Geo. 4. c. 58)
- Metropolitan Police Act 1829 (10 Geo. 4. c. 44)

As of 2026, the act remains partly in force in the United Kingdom.

== Background ==
In the United Kingdom, acts of Parliament remain in force until expressly repealed. Blackstone's Commentaries on the Laws of England, published in the late 18th-century, raised questions about the system and structure of the common law and the poor drafting and disorder of the existing statute book.

From 1810 to 1825, The Statutes of the Realm was published, providing the first authoritative collection of acts. The first statute law revision act was not passed until 1856 with the Repeal of Obsolete Statutes Act 1856 (19 & 20 Vict. c. 64). This approach – focusing on removing obsolete laws from the statute book followed by consolidation – was proposed by Peter Locke King MP, who had been highly critical of previous commissions' approaches, expenditures, and lack of results.

Previous statute law revision acts
Year passed	Title	Citation	Effect
1861	Statute Law Revision Act 1861	24 & 25 Vict. c. 101	Repealed or amended over 800 enactments
1863	Statute Law Revision Act 1863	26 & 27 Vict. c. 125	Repealed or amended over 1,600 enactments for England and Wales
1867	Statute Law Revision Act 1867	30 & 31 Vict. c. 59	Repealed or amended over 1,380 enactments
1870	Statute Law Revision Act 1870	33 & 34 Vict. c. 69	Repealed or amended over 250 enactments
1871	Promissory Oaths Act 1871	34 & 35 Vict. c. 48	Repealed or amended almost 200 enactments
1871	Statute Law Revision Act 1871	34 & 35 Vict. c. 116	Repealed or amended over 1,060 enactments
1872	Statute Law Revision Act 1872	35 & 36 Vict. c. 63	Repealed or amended almost 490 enactments
1872	Statute Law (Ireland) Revision Act 1872	35 & 36 Vict. c. 98	Repealed or amended over 1,050 enactments
1872	Statute Law Revision Act 1872 (No. 2)	35 & 36 Vict. c. 97	Repealed or amended almost 260 enactments

== Passage ==
The Statute Law Revision Bill had its first reading in the House of Lords on 26 June 1873, introduced by the Lord Chancellor, William Wood, 1st Baron Hatherley. The bill had its second reading in the House of Lords on 7 July 1873 and was committed to a committee of the whole house, which met and reported on 10 July 1873, with amendments. The amended bill was considered and had its third reading in the House of Lords on 11 July 1873 and passed, without amendments.

The bill had its first reading in the House of Commons on 15 July 1873, introduced by the Attorney General, John Coleridge MP. The bill had its second reading on 22 July 1872 and was committed to a committee of the whole house, which met and reported on 28 July 1873, with amendments. The amended bill was considered on 29 July 1873, and had its third reading in the House of Commons on 30 July 1873 and passed, without amendments.

The amended bill was considered and agreed to by the House of Lords on 2 August 1873.

The bill was granted royal assent on 5 August 1873.

== Subsequent developments ==
The act was intended, in particular, to facilitate the preparation of a revised edition of the statutes.

The act was amended by section 2 of the Statute Law Revision Act 1878 (41 & 42 Vict. c. 79), which came into force on 16 August 1878.

The preamble and the schedule to this act were repealed by section 1 of, and the first part of the schedule to, the Statute Law Revision Act 1898 (61 & 62 Vict. c. 22), which came into force on 25 July 1898.

The enactments which were repealed (whether for the whole or any part of the United Kingdom) by the act were repealed so far as they extended to the Isle of Man by section 1(1) of, and schedule 1 to, the Statute Law Revision (Isle of Man) Act 1991, which came into force on 25 July 1991.

The act was retained for the Republic of Ireland by section 2(2)(a) of, and part 4 of schedule 1 to, the Statute Law Revision Act 2007.

== Repealed enactments ==
Section 1 of the act repealed 1,255 enactments, listed in the schedule to the act, across six categories: (Note: The Note of the bill, unlike the schedule, gives commentary on each act, noting any earlier repeals and the reason for the new repeal)

- Expired
- Spent
- Repealed in general terms
- Virtually repealed
- Superseded
- Obsolete

Section 1 of the act included several safeguards to ensure that the repeal does not negatively affect existing rights or ongoing legal matters. Specifically, any legal rights, privileges, or remedies already obtained under the repealed laws, as well as any legal proceedings or principles established by them, remain unaffected. Section 1 of the act also ensured that repealed enactments that have been incorporated into other laws would continue to have legal effect in those contexts. Moreover, the repeal would not revive any former rights, offices, or jurisdictions that had already been abolished.

Citation	Short title	Title	Extent of repeal
15 Geo. 2. c. 30	Marriage of Lunatics Act 1741	An Act to prevent the Marriage of Lunaticks.	The whole act.
42 Geo. 3. c. 90	Militia Act 1802	An Act for amending the Laws relating to the Militia in England, and for augmenting the Militia	Section Eighty-two.
42 Geo. 3. c. 91	Militia (Scotland) Act 1802	An Act to raise and establish a Militia Force in Scotland	Sections One and Twelve, so far as they relate to the qualifications of deputy lieutenants and of officers in the Militia. Section One from "and shall certify" to "disapproved by His Majesty". Section Nine from "and every Deputy Lieutenant" to end of that section. Section Sixteen from "and the Lieutenant with" to "authorized to pay the same". Section Forty-seven from "and a reasonable Allowance" to end of that section. Section Seventy-one from "although" to "Captains". Section Seventy-two from "and every such Surgeon shall" to "Battalion to which he shall belong". Section Seventy-three from "although" to "respectively". Section Seventy-six. Section Seventy-seven from "and all Serjeants, Corporals" to "legally discharged". Section Seventy-eight. Section Seventy-nine from "all which Serjeants" to end of that Section. Section Eighty-two from "with the Approbation of His Majesty" to end of that section. Section One hundred and three from "and every Serjeant" to "no more", and from "and such Adjutant" to end of that section. Sections One hundred and eight and One hundred and seventy-one.
44 Geo. 3. c. 54	Parochial Schools (Scotland) Act 1803	An Act to consolidate and amend the Provisions of the several Acts relating to Corps of Yeomanry and Volunteers in Great Britain; and to make further Regulations relating thereto	Section Forty-one.
47 Geo. 3 Sess. 2. c. 41	Fees, etc., in Public Offices (Ireland) Act 1807	An Act to enable the East India Company to raise Money upon Bond instead of increasing their Capital Stock.	Repealed as to all Her Majesty's Dominions.
48 Geo. 3. c. 140	Dublin Police Magistrates Act 1808	An Act for the more effectual Administration of the Office of a Justice of the Peace, and for the more effectual Prevention of Felonies within the District of Dublin Metropolis	Sections Sixty-eight and Ninety-one to Ninety-three.
49 Geo. 3. c. 144	Oyster Fisheries (England) Act 1808	An Act for the more effectual Protection of Oyster Fisheries and the Brood of Oysters, in England.	The whole act.
49 Geo. 3. c. 120	Militia (Ireland) Act 1809	An Act for amending and reducing into One Act of Parliament the several Laws for arming and train-ing the Militia of Ireland	Section Thirty-five and One hundred and thirty-nine.
51 Geo. 3. c. 1	Care of King During his Illness, etc. Act 1811	An Act to provide for the Administration of the Royal Authority, and for the Care of His Majesty's Royal Person, during the Continuance of His Majesty's Illness; and for the Resumption of the Exercise of the Royal Authority by His Majesty.	The whole act.
51 Geo. 3. c. 2	Duties on Malt, etc. Act 1811	An Act for continuing to His Majesty certain Duties on Malt, Sugar, Tobacco, and Snuff, in Great Britain; and on Pensions, Offices, and Personal Estates in England; for the Service of the Year One thousand eight hundred and eleven.	The whole act.
51 Geo. 3. c. 3	Exchequer Bills Act 1811	An Act for raising the Sum of Ten millions five hundred thousand Pounds, by Exchequer Bills, for the Service of Great Britain for the Year One thousand eight hundred and eleven.	The whole act.
51 Geo. 3. c. 4	Exchequer Bills (No. 2) Act 1811	An Act for raising the Sum of One million five hundred thousand Pounds, by Exchequer Bills, for the Service of Great Britain for the Year One thousand eight hundred and eleven.	The whole act.
51 Geo. 3. c. 5	Treasury Bills (Ireland) Act 1811	An Act for raising the Sum of One million by Treasury Bills for the Service of Ireland for the Year One thousand eight hundred and eleven.	The whole act.
51 Geo. 3. c. 6	Census (Great Britain) Act 1811	An Act for taking an Account of the Population of Great Britain, and of the Increase or Diminution thereof.	The whole act.
51 Geo. 3. c. 8	Mutiny Act 1811	An Act for punishing Mutiny and Desertion; and for the better Payment of the Army and their Quarters.	The whole act.
51 Geo. 3. c. 9	Marine Mutiny Act 1811	An Act for the Regulation of His Majesty's Royal Marine Forces while on Shore.	The whole act.
51 Geo. 3. c. 10	Wide Streets, Dublin Act 1811	An Act to continue until the Twenty-fifth Day of March One thousand eight hundred and thirty-three, certain Acts of the Parliament of Ireland, so far as the same relate to the Improvement of the City of Dublin, by making wide and convenient Passages through the same.	The whole act.
51 Geo. 3. c. 11	Coal Duty, Dublin Act 1811	An Act to continue until the Twenty-fifth Day of March One thousand eight hundred and thirty-two, certain Acts of the Parliament of Ireland, so far as the same relate to the Duty on Coals imported into the Harbour of Dublin, and to the regulating the Coal Trade thereof.	The whole act.
51 Geo. 3. c. 12	Drawbacks, etc., on Sugar Act 1811	An Act to continue, until the Twenty-fifth Day of March One thousand eight hundred and twelve, an Act for regulating the Drawbacks and Bounties on the Exportation of Sugar from Ireland.	The whole act.
51 Geo. 3. c. 13	Sugar Bounties, etc. Act 1811	An Act the title of which begins with the words,—An Act for further continuing until the Twenty-fifth Day of March,—and ends with the words,—Bounty on Raw Sugar exported, until the Twenty-fifth Day of March one thousand eight hundred and twelve.	The whole act.
51 Geo. 3. c. 14	Exportation and Importation Act 1811	An Act the title of which begins with the words,—An Act to continue several Laws relating to permitting the Warehousing of Spirits in Ireland, and British and Irish Linens exported,—and ends with the words,—Twenty-fifth Day of March One thousand eight hundred and twelve.	The whole act.
51 Geo. 3. c. 15	Exchequer Bills (No. 3) Act 1811	An Act for enabling His Majesty to direct the Issue of Exchequer Bills to a limited Amount, for the purposes and in the Manner therein mentioned.	The whole act.
51 Geo. 3. c. 17	Indemnity Act 1811	An Act to render valid certain Acts done in completing the Regular Militia, and to indemnify the Persons concerned therein.	The whole act.
51 Geo. 3. c. 18	Indemnity (No. 2) Act 1811	An Act the title of which begins with the words,—An Act to indemnify such Persons in the United Kingdom as have omitted to qualify themselves for Offices and Employments, and ends with the words,—First Day of Hilary Term One thousand eight hundred and twelve.	The whole act.
51 Geo. 3. c. 19	Inquiry into Military Expenditure, etc. Act 1811	An Act the title of which begins with the words,—An Act to continue until the Twenty-fifth Day of March,—and ends with the words,—Public Works executed by the Office of Works and others.	The whole act.
51 Geo. 3. c. 24	Clearance of Vessels, London Act 1811	An Act the title of which begins with the words,—An Act to repeal so much of an Act of the Nineteenth Year of His present Majesty,—and ends with the words,—Vessel entered inwards or outwards from or to any Port in Ireland.	The whole act.
51 Geo. 3. c. 25	Payment of Creditors (Scotland) Act 1811	An Act for further continuing, until the Twenty-fifth Day of July One thousand eight hundred and thirteen, an Act made in the Thirty-third Year of His present Majesty, for rendering the Payment of Creditors more equal and expeditious in Scotland.	The whole act.
51 Geo. 3. c. 27	Malt, etc., Duties Act 1811	An Act to explain and amend Two Acts of the Fiftieth and Fifty-first Years of His present Majesty, for continuing certain Duties on Malt, Sugar, Tobacco, and Snuff, and other Purposes mentioned in the said Acts.	The whole act.
51 Geo. 3. c. 28	Quartering of Soldiers Act 1811	An Act for increasing the Rates of Subsistence to be paid to Innkeepers and others on quartering Soldiers.	The whole act.
51 Geo. 3. c. 29	Bringing of Coals, etc., to London Act 1811	An Act for continuing, until the First Day of August One thousand eight hundred and thirteen, Two Acts of the Forty-fifth and Fiftieth Years of His present Majesty, allowing the bringing of Coals, Culm, and Cinders to London and Westminster, by Inland Navigation.	The whole act.
51 Geo. 3. c. 31	Duty on Copper Act 1811	An Act for continuing, during the present War and until Six Calendar Months after the Ratification of a Definitive Treaty of Peace, and amend An Act made in the Forty-eighth Year of His present Majesty, for granting an additional Duty on Copper imported into Great Britain.	The whole act.
51 Geo. 3. c. 33	British Calicoes Act 1811	An Act for repealing so much of Two Acts of the Fourteenth and Twenty-eighth Years of His present Majesty as relates to weaving Blue Stripes in British Callicoes.	The whole act.
51 Geo. 3. c. 40	Highways (Ireland) Act 1811	An Act to explain and amend an Act of the last Session of Parliament, for repealing certain Parts of several Acts relating to the limiting the Number of Persons to be carried by Stage Coaches in Ireland.	The whole act.
51 Geo. 3. c. 41	Stealing of Linen, etc. Act 1811	An Act the title of which begins with the words,—An Act to repeal so much of an Act, passed in the Eighteenth Year,—and ends with the words,—preventing such Felonies	Section One.
51 Geo. 3. c. 42	Distillers of Spirits Act 1811	An Act the title of which begins with the words,—An Act to empower the Scots Commissaries to grant Commissions for examining Witnesses in Causes from Sugar,—and ends with the words,—Duties imposed by the said Act.	The whole act.
51 Geo. 3. c. 44	Duty on Linen Act 1811	An Act for imposing an additional Duty on Linen imported into Great Britain during the Continuance of the present War, and for Six Months after the Ratification of a Definitive Treaty of Peace.	The whole act.
51 Geo. 3. c. 45	St. John's, Newfoundland, etc. Act 1811	An Act for taking away the public Use of certain Ships Rooms in the Town of Saint John, in the Island of Newfoundland; and for instituting Surrogate Courts on the Coast of Labrador, and in certain Islands adjacent thereto	Repealed as to all Her Majesty's Dominions
51 Geo. 3. c. 46	Quarantine Act 1811	An Act to authorize the Officers of the Customs to act for the Superintendant of Quarantine, and his Assistants.	The whole act.
51 Geo. 3. c. 47	Commercial Treaty with Portugal Act 1811	An Act for carrying into Effect the Provisions of a Treaty of Amity, Commerce, and Navigation concluded between His Majesty and His Royal Highness the Prince Regent of Portugal.	Repealed as to all Her Majesty's Dominions
51 Geo. 3. c. 51	Prisage and Butlerage of Wines (Ireland) Act 1811	An Act for abolishing the Duties of Prisage and Butlerage of Wines in Ireland.	The whole act.
51 Geo. 3. c. 53	Exchequer Bills (No. 4) Act 1811	An Act for raising the Sum of Six Millions, by Exchequer Bills, for the Service of Great Britain, for the Year One thousand eight hundred and eleven.	The whole act.
51 Geo. 3. c. 54	Exchequer Bills (No. 5) Act 1811	An Act for raising the Sum of One million five hundred thousand Pounds, by Exchequer Bills, for the Service of Great Britain for the Year One thousand eight hundred and eleven.	The whole act.
51 Geo. 3. c. 60	Duties on Hats, etc., Repeal (Ireland) Act 1811	An Act to repeal the Duties of Stamps on Hats made in Ireland, and on Licences to Persons to manufacture Hats, or to utter or vend Hats in Ireland, and all Regulations for securing the said Duties.	The whole act.
51 Geo. 3. c. 63	Prisoners (Ireland) Act 1811	An Act to amend an Act, passed in Ireland, for Confinement and hard Labour of Persons in Ireland liable to Transportation; and to repeal so much of a former Act as relates to that Subject.	The whole act.
51 Geo. 3. c. 64	East India Company Bonds Act 1811	An Act to enable the East India Company to raise a further Sum of Money upon Bond, instead of increasing their Capital Stock; and to alter and amend an Act, passed in the Forty-seventh Year of the Reign of His present Majesty, relative thereto.	Except the last two Sections. Repealed as to all Her Majesty's Dominions.
51 Geo. 3. c. 70	Duty on Hats, etc., Repeal (Great Britain) Act 1811	An Act for repealing the Hat Duty in Great Britain.	The whole act.
51 Geo. 3. c. 75	East India Company Act 1811	An Act the title of which begins with the words,—An Act for making further Provision for the Payment of Salaries and other Charges in the Office of the Commissioners for the Affairs of India,—and ends with the words,—to take up Ships by private Contract.	Except Section Four. Repealed as to all Her Majesty's Dominions.
51 Geo. 3. c. 76	Horse Duty Act 1811	An Act the title of which begins with the words,—An Act for letting to farm the Duties on Horses hired by the Mile or Stage, to be used in travelling, —and ends with the words,—facilitating the Recovery of the said Duties.	The whole act.
51 Geo. 3. c. 78	Relief of Families of Militiamen (Ireland) Act 1811	An Act to make Provision in certain Cases for the Wives and Families of Serjeants, Corporals, Drummers, and Privates, serving in the Militia of Ireland.	Section One. Section Twenty-five, except as to the county of the city of Dublin. Sections Thirty-one and Thirty-two.
51 Geo. 3. c. 80	Parish Apprentices Act 1811	An Act to render valid certain Indentures for the binding of Parish Apprentices.	The whole act.
51 Geo. 3. c. 81	Fees etc., in Public Offices, etc. (Ireland) Act 1811	An Act the title of which begins with the words,—An Act to continue until the First Day of August,—and ends with the words,—accounting for Public Money in Ireland.	The whole act.
51 Geo. 3. c. 84	Parliamentary Elections Act 1811	An Act the title of which begins with the words,—An Act to explain an Act passed in the Twenty-second Year of His present Majesty,—and ends with the words,—so far as relates to Coal Meters and Coal Meters of the City of London.	The whole act.
51 Geo. 3. c. 85	Exchequer Bills (No. 6) Act 1811	An Act to enable the Commissioners of His Majesty's Treasury to issue Exchequer Bills, on the Credit of such Aids or Supplies as have been or shall be granted by Parliament for the Service of Great Britain for the Year One thousand eight hundred and eleven.	The whole act.
51 Geo. 3. c. 86	Exportation and Importation (No. 2) Act 1811	An Act the title of which begins with the words,—An Act to continue, until the Fifth Day of July,—and ends with the words,—Drawbacks on the Exportation of certain Goods, Wares, and Merchandize into and from Ireland.	The whole act.
51 Geo. 3. c. 88	Treasury Bills (Ireland) (No. 2) Act 1811	An Act for raising the Sum of Two hundred thousand Pounds by Treasury Bills for the Service of Ireland for the Year One thousand eight hundred and eleven.	The whole act.
51 Geo. 3. c. 90	Militia Pay (Ireland) Act 1811	An Act for defraying, until the Twenty-fifth Day of March One thousand eight hundred and twelve, the Charge of the Pay and Cloathing of the Militia of Ireland; and for making Allowances in certain Cases to Subaltern Officers of the said Militia during Peace.	The whole act.
51 Geo. 3. c. 91	Arrears of Crown Rents (Ireland) Act 1811	An Act for discharging certain Arrears of Quit, Crown, and Composition Rents, which have been growing due in Ireland.	The whole act.
51 Geo. 3. c. 92	Highways (Ireland) (No. 2) Act 1811	An Act to repeal certain Parts of several Acts of the Parliament of Ireland, relating to the Tolls on Stage Coaches, carrying above a certain Number of Passengers, and to make other Provisions in lieu thereof.	The whole act.
51 Geo. 3. c. 94	Preservation of Timber Act 1811	An Act the title of which begins with the words,—An Act to continue until the Twenty-ninth Day of July,—and ends with the words,—ascertaining the Boundaries of Counties, and the Lands of the Crown within the same.	The whole act.
51 Geo. 3. c. 95	Excise, etc. Act 1811	An Act to explain and amend an Act relating to Auctioneers, and the Duties on Estates and Goods sold by Auction; the allowing Dealers to roast their own Coffee, without taking out a Roaster's Licence; and to the Water Mark of the Year on Paper intended for Exportation.	The whole act.
51 Geo. 3. c. 99	Parliamentary Elections (No. 2) Act 1811	An Act for removing Doubts as to the Registering of certain Property purchased or sold under the Land Tax Redemption Act, in Right of which Persons may claim to vote at Elections of Members to serve in Parliament.	The whole act.
51 Geo. 3. c. 103	Retirement of Officers on Half Pay Act 1811	An Act to authorize the allowing Officers to retire on Half Pay or other Allowances, under certain Restrictions.	Section Two. Section Three, the words "or on Full Pay from any Veteran Battalion ".
51 Geo. 3. c. 107	Militia and Local Militia Pay (Great Britain) Act 1811	An Act for defraying the Charge of the Pay and Cloathing of the Militia and Local Militia in Great Britain for the Year One thousand eight hundred and eleven.	The whole act.
51 Geo. 3. c. 108	Militia Allowances Act 1811	An Act the title of which begins with the words,—An Act to revive and continue, until the Twenty-fifth Day of March,—and ends with the words,—Militia of England, disembodied under an Act of the same Session of Parliament.	The whole act.
51 Geo. 3. c. 109	Militia Allowances (No. 2) Act 1811	An Act for making Allowances in certain Cases to Subaltern Officers of the Militia in Great Britain, while disembodied.	The whole act.
51 Geo. 3. c. 111	Manufacture of Maidstone Geneva, etc. Act 1811	An Act the title of which begins with the words,—An Act for permitting Sir William Bishop and George Bishop to continue,—and ends with the words,—Treasury to exonerate Distillers of Spirits from Sugar from the Excess of Duties therein mentioned.	The whole act.
51 Geo. 3. c. 112	Exchequer Bills (No. 7) Act 1811	An Act for enabling His Majesty to raise the Sum of Three Millions for the Service of Great Britain.	The whole act.
51 Geo. 3. c. 113	Lotteries Act 1811	An Act for granting to His Majesty a Sum of Money to be raised by Lotteries.	The whole act.
51 Geo. 3. c. 114	Militia (Stannaries) Act 1811	An Act to permit the Services of the Regiment of Militia of Cornwall and Devon to be extended to Ireland.	Section One. Section Two to "instead thereof ". Sections Five, Eight, and Ten to Fourteen.
51 Geo. 3. c. 117	Appropriation Act 1811	An Act the title of which begins with the words,—An Act for granting to His Majesty certain Sums of Money out of the Consolidated Fund,—and ends with the words,—Supplies granted in this Session of Parliament.	The whole act.
51 Geo. 3. c. 118	Militia (No. 2) Act 1811	An Act to permit the Interchange of the British and Irish Militias respectively.	Section One. Section Two to "instead thereof" and from "And every Person" to end of that Section, so far as the last-mentioned part relates to the Militia raised in Great Britain. Section Five, so far as it relates to 49 Geo. 3. c. 86. and to the Militia raised in England. Sections Eleven to Fifteen.
51 Geo. 3. c. 119	Justice of the Peace, Metropolis Act 1811	An Act the title of which begins with the words,—An Act for repealing Two Acts made in the Forty-second and Forty-seventh Years,—and ends with the words,—Six Weeks from the Commencement of the then next Session of Parliament.	The whole act.
51 Geo. 3. c. 121	Drawbacks on Spirits Act 1811	An Act the title of which begins with the words,—An Act to suspend the Payment of all Drawbacks on Spirits made or distilled in Great Britain or Ireland,—and ends with the words,—Three Months after the Commencement of the next Session of Parliament.	The whole act.
51 Geo. 3. c. 122	Bogs (Ireland) Act 1811	An Act the title of which begins with the words,—An Act to continue, until the First Day of January,—and ends with the words,—Bogs in Ireland, and the Practicability of draining and cultivating them, and the best Means of effecting the same.	The whole act.
51 Geo. 3. c. 123	Insolvent Debtors Relief (Ireland) Act 1811	An Act for the Relief of certain Insolvent Debtors in Ireland.	The whole act.
51 Geo. 3. c. 124	Frivolous Arrests Act 1811	An Act the title of which begins with the words,—An Act further to extend and render more effectual certain Provisions of an Act, passed in the Twelfth Year,—and ends with the words,—extending the Provisions of the said former Acts.	The whole act.
51 Geo. 3. c. 125	Insolvent Debtors Relief (England) Act 1811	An Act for the Relief of certain Insolvent Debtors in England.	The whole act.
51 Geo. 3. c. 126	Westminster Parliamentary Elections Act 1811	An Act the title of which begins with the words,—An Act to extend an Act made in the Eighteenth Year,—and ends with the words,—Expenses of Hustings and Poll Clerks, so far as regards the City of Westminster.	The whole act.
51 Geo. 3. c. 127	Gold Currency and Bank Notes Act 1811	An Act the title of which begins with the words,—An Act for making more effectual Provision for preventing the current Gold Coin,—and ends with the words,—staying Proceedings upon any Distress by Tender of such Notes.	The whole act.
51 Geo. 3. c. 128	Militia (No. 3) Act 1811	An Act to explain an Act passed in this present Session of Parliament, intituled, An Act to permit the Interchange of the British and Irish Militias respectively.	The whole act.
52 Geo. 3. c. 1	Duties on Malt, etc. Act 1812	An Act for continuing to His Majesty certain Duties on Malt, Sugar, Tobacco, and Snuff, in Great Britain; and on Pensions, Offices, and Personal Estates in England; for the Service of the Year One thousand eight hundred and twelve.	The whole act.
52 Geo. 3. c. 3	Distillation of Spirits Act 1812	An Act the title of which begins with the words,—An Act to revive and continue, until the Thirty-first Day of December,—and ends with the words,—Worts or Wash made from Sugar during the Prohibition of Distillation from Corn or Grain in Great Britain.	The whole act.
52 Geo. 3. c. 4	Exchequer Bills Act 1812	An Act for raising the Sum of Ten millions five hundred thousand Pounds, by Exchequer Bills, for the Service of Great Britain for the Year One thousand eight hundred and twelve.	The whole act.
52 Geo. 3. c. 5	Exchequer Bills (No. 2) Act 1812	An Act for raising the Sum of One million five hundred thousand Pounds, by Exchequer Bills, for the Service of Great Britain for the Year One thousand eight hundred and twelve.	The whole act.
52 Geo. 3. c. 6	Civil List during King's Illness Act 1812	An Act for making provision for the better Support of His Majesty's Household during the Continuance of His Majesty's Indisposition.	The whole act.
52 Geo. 3. c. 7	Expenses of Prince Regent Act 1812	An Act for granting to His Majesty a certain Sum for defraying the Expences incident to the Assumption of the personal Exercise of the Royal Authority by His Royal Highness the Prince Regent in the Name and on the Behalf of His Majesty.	The whole act.
52 Geo. 3. c. 8	Royal Household, etc. Act 1812	An Act the title of which begins with the words,—An Act for the Regulation of His Majesty's Household,—and ends with the words,—Administration of the Royal Authority during His Majesty's Illness.	The whole act.
52 Geo. 3. c. 10	East India Company Act 1812	An Act the title of which begins with the words,—An Act to amend an Act of the Fifteenth Year of His present Majesty,—and ends with the words,—Company of Merchants of England trading to the East Indies.	The whole act.
52 Geo. 3. c. 11	House of Commons (Offices) Act 1812	An Act to repeal an Act passed in the Fortieth Year of His present Majesty, for establishing certain Regulations in the Offices of the House of Commons, and to establish other and further Regulations in the said Offices.	Section One. Section Three from "and shall by" to end of that Section. Section Four. Section Five from "and by" to end of that Section. Section Six from "and it shall be" to end of that Section. Sections Seven to Ten. Section Fifteen from "Provided" to end of that Section. Section Sixteen from "and in the Case" to end.
52 Geo. 3. c. 12	Embezzlement of Naval, etc., Stores Act 1812	An Act for extending the Laws for preventing the Embezzlement of His Majesty's Naval, Ordnance, and Victualling Stores to Ireland.	The whole act.
52 Geo. 3. c. 13	Insolvent Debtors Relief (England) Act 1812	An Act to alter and amend an Act passed in the Fifty-first Year of the Reign of His present Majesty, for the Relief of certain Insolvent Debtors in England.	The whole act.
52 Geo. 3. c. 15	Bounties, etc., on Sugar Act 1812	An Act the title of which begins with the words,—An Act for further continuing, until the Twenty-fifth Day of March,—and ends with the words,—Bounty on Raw Sugar exported, until the Twenty-fifth Day of March One thousand eight hundred and thirteen.	The whole act.
52 Geo. 3. c. 17	Preservation of the Peace Act 1812	An Act for the more effectual Preservation of the Peace, by enforcing the Duties of Watching and Warding, until the First Day of March One thousand eight hundred and fourteen, in Places where Disturbances prevail or are apprehended.	The whole act.
52 Geo. 3. c. 19	Lotteries Act 1812	An Act to amend an Act of the last Session of Parliament, for granting to His Majesty a Sum of Money to be raised by Lotteries.	The whole act.
52 Geo. 3. c. 20	Importation, etc. Act 1812	An Act the title of which begins with the words,—An Act to continue several Laws relating to permitting the Importation of Tobacco,—and ends with the words,—Merchandize into and from certain Ports in the West Indies, until the Twenty-fifth Day of March One thousand eight hundred and sixteen.	The whole act.
52 Geo. 3. c. 21	Validity of Certain Oaths Act 1812	An Act to render valid and effectual certain Oaths administered to and taken by certain Members of the House of Commons before Deputies of the late Lord Steward of His Majesty's Household, during the Vacancy in the said Office.	The whole act.
52 Geo. 3. c. 22	Mutiny Act 1812	An Act for punishing Mutiny and Desertion; and for the better Payment of the Army and their Quarters.	The whole act.
52 Geo. 3. c. 23	Marine Mutiny Act 1812	An Act for regulating of His Majesty's Royal Marine Forces while on Shore.	The whole act.
52 Geo. 3. c. 25	Exportation Act 1812	An Act to continue, until the Twenty-fifth Day of March One thousand eight hundred and thirteen, an Act for regulating the Drawbacks and Bounties on the Exportation of Sugar from Ireland.	The whole act.
52 Geo. 3. c. 28	Relief of Families of Militiamen (Ireland) Act 1812	An Act to amend an Act of the last Session of Parliament, making Provision for the Families of Militia Men in Ireland.	The last two Sections.
52 Geo. 3. c. 31	Repeal of 39 Eliz. 1. c. 17 Act 1812	An Act to repeal an Act made in the Thirty-ninth Year of the Reign of Queen Elizabeth, to prevent inconveniences arising by such lewd Persons presenting themselves to be Soldiers or Mariners.	The whole act.
52 Geo. 3. c. 33	Importation (No. 2) Act 1812	An Act the title of which begins with the words,—An Act to continue, until the Expiration of Six Months,—and ends with the words,—Timber for Naval Purposes, from the British Colonies in North America, Duty free.	The whole act.
52 Geo. 3. c. 38	Local Militia (England) Act 1812	An Act for amending the Laws relating to the Local Militia in England.	Section One. Section Two, the words "being qualified as herein after is directed, and ",—" qualified as herein after directed," and from "and shall certify" to "disapproved by His Majesty;". Sections Five and Seven to Twelve. Section Thirteen, the words "with the like Qualifications, and ". Section Fifteen. Section Seventeen from "if" to "or". Section Nineteen. Section Thirty-one to "present Period of Service in the said Local Militia: Provided always, that ". Sections Sixty-nine to Seventy-one. Section Seventy-seven from "although" to "for Captains ". Section Seventy-nine from "although" to "respectively:". Sections Eighty-one, One hundred and ninety-eight and One hundred and ninety-nine. Section Two hundred and one so far as it relates to courts in the principality of Wales or of the county palatine of Chester. Section Two hundred and nine. Schedule (A.).
52 Geo. 3. c. 40	Grants of Officers Act 1812	An Act to make Provision for a limited Time respecting certain Grants of Offices.	The whole act.
52 Geo. 3. c. 41	Expenditure, etc., of Office of Works, etc. Act 1812	An Act the title of which begins with the words,—An Act to amend and continue until the Twenty-fifth Day of March,—and ends with the words,—Public Works executed by the Office of Works and others.	The whole act.
52 Geo. 3. c. 43	Quartering of Soldiers Act 1812	An Act for increasing the Rates of Subsistence to be paid to Innkeepers and others on quartering Soldiers.	The whole act.
52 Geo. 3. c. 45	Exportation (No. 2) Act 1812	An Act to suspend the Exportation from Ireland to Parts beyond the Seas of Spirits made or distilled in Ireland from Corn or Grain, until the Thirty-first Day of December One thousand eight hundred and twelve.	The whole act.
52 Geo. 3. c. 47	Distillation (Ireland) Act 1812	An Act to revive and continue until the Thirty-first Day of December One thousand eight hundred and twelve, so much of an Act made in the Forty-ninth Year of His present Majesty, to prohibit the Distillation of Spirits from Corn or Grain in the United Kingdom, as relates to Ireland.	The whole act.
52 Geo. 3. c. 50	Gold Currency, etc. Act 1812	An Act the title of which begins with the words,—An Act to continue until Three Months after the Commencement of the next Session,—and ends with the words,—staying Proceedings upon any Distress by Tender of such Notes; and to extend the same to Ireland.	The whole act.
52 Geo. 3. c. 54	Duties on Glass Act 1812	An Act for continuing, until the First Day of August One thousand eight hundred and thirteen, several Laws relating to the Duties on Glass made in Great Britain.	The whole act.
52 Geo. 3. c. 57	Annuities to Princesses Act 1812	An Act to enable His Majesty to settle on their Royal Highnesses the Princess Augusta Sophia, Elizabeth, Mary, and Sophia, an Annuity of Thirty-six thousand Pounds, instead of the Annuity settled on them by an Act passed in the Eighteenth Year of His present Majesty.	The whole act.
52 Geo. 3. c. 61	Excise (No. 2) Act 1812	An Act to grant an Excise Duty on Spirits made or distilled from Sugar in Ireland, during the Prohibition of Distillation from Corn or Grain there, in lieu of the Excise Duty now chargeable thereon, and to allow a Drawback on the Exportation thereof.	The whole act.
52 Geo. 3. c. 65	Use of Sugar in Brewing (Great Britain) Act 1812	An Act to allow the Use of Sugar in brewing Beer in Great Britain.	The whole act.
52 Geo. 3. c. 66	Security of Public Officers Act 1812	An Act the title of which begins with the words,—An Act to explain and amend an Act of the Fiftieth Year,—and ends with the words,—Grant of such Offices.	Sections Three and Four. Section Six from "within" to "thereafter ". Sections Seven, Twelve, and Sixteen to Eighteen.
52 Geo. 3. c. 67	Family of Right Honourable Spencer Perceval Act 1812	An Act for settling and securing certain Annuities on the Widow and eldest Son of the late Right Honourable Spencer Perceval, and for granting a Sum of Money for the Use of his other Children.	The whole act.
52 Geo. 3. c. 68	Local Militia (Scotland) Act 1812	An Act for amending the Laws relating to the Local Militia in Scotland.	Section One. Section Two, the words "being qualified as herein after is directed, and "—" qualified as herein after directed," and from "and shall certify" to "disapproved by His Majesty;". Section Five. Section Eleven, the words "with the like Qualifications, and ". Section Thirteen. Section Fifteen from "and actually" to "Act,". Section Seventeen. Section Thirty-seven to "present Period of Service in the said Local Militia: Provided always, that ". Sections Sixty-seven to Sixty-nine. Section Seventy-six from "although" to "for Captains ". Section Seventy-eight from "although" to "respectively:". Sections Eighty, One hundred and seventy-nine, One hundred and eighty, and One hundred and eighty-nine. Schedule (A.).
52 Geo. 3. c. 69	Importation and Exportation Act 1812	An Act to continue, until the Fifth Day of July One thousand eight hundred and thirteen, several Acts for granting certain Rates and Duties, and for allowing certain Drawbacks and Bounties on Goods, Wares, and Merchandize, imported into and exported from Ireland.	The whole act.
52 Geo. 3. c. 73	Relief of the Poor (England) Act 1812	An Act for repealing so much of an Act of the Thirty-sixth Year of His present Majesty, for the further Relief of the Poor within England, and enlarging the Powers of the Guardians of the Poor, as limits the annual Amount of the Assessments.	The whole act.
52 Geo. 3. c. 74	Bogs (Ireland) Act 1812	An Act the title of which begins with the words,—An Act to continue until the First Day of January,—and ends with the words,—Bogs in Ireland, and the Practicability of draining and cultivating them, and the best Means of effecting the same.	The whole act.
52 Geo. 3. c. 78	Appeal in Revenue Cases (Ireland) Act 1812	An Act to make better Provision for the Commissioners of Appeal in Revenue Causes in Ireland.	The whole act.
52 Geo. 3. c. 80	Land Tax Redemption Act 1812	An Act for extending the Period in which Deeds were directed to be enrolled by an Act of the Fiftieth Year of His present Majesty, for amending several Acts for the Redemption and Sale of the Land Tax.	The whole act.
52 Geo. 3. c. 83	Militia Allowances Act 1812	An Act the title of which begins with the words,—An Act to revive and continue, until the Twenty-fifth Day of March,—and ends with the words,—Militia of England, disembodied under an Act of the same Session of Parliament.	The whole act.
52 Geo. 3. c. 84	Militia Allowances (No. 2) Act 1812	An Act for making Allowances in certain Cases to Subaltern Officers of the Militia in Great Britain, while disembodied.	The whole act.
52 Geo. 3. c. 86	Exchequer Bills (No. 3) Act 1812	An Act for raising the Sum of Five Millions, by Exchequer Bills, for the Service of Great Britain, for the Year One thousand eight hundred and twelve.	The whole act.
52 Geo. 3. c. 89	Customs Act (No. 3) 1812	An Act for charging an additional Duty on Copper imported into Great Britain, until the Expiration of Six Calendar Months after the Ratification of a Definitive Treaty of Peace.	The whole act.
52 Geo. 3. c. 90	Treasury Bills (Ireland) Act 1812	An Act for raising the Sum of Five hundred thousand Pounds by Treasury Bills for the Service of Ireland, for the Year One thousand eight hundred and twelve.	The whole act.
52 Geo. 3. c. 91	Peace Preservation (Ireland) Act 1812	An Act to continue, until the Twenty-fifth Day of March One thousand eight hundred and fourteen, an Act made in the Parliament of Ireland in the Twenty-seventh Year of His present Majesty, for the better Execution of the Law and Preservation of the Peace within Counties at large.	The whole act.
52 Geo. 3. c. 92	Fees in Public Offices, etc. (Ireland) Act 1812	An Act the title of which begins with the words,—An Act to continue, until the First Day of August,—and ends with the words,—accounting for public Money in Ireland.	The whole act.
52 Geo. 3. c. 95	Taxes (Scotland) Act 1812	An Act to amend and regulate the Assessment and Collection of the Assessed Taxes, and of the Rates and Duties on Profits arising from Property, Professions, Trades and Offices, in that Part of Great Britain called Scotland.	Except Sections Thirteen, Fourteen, Twenty, Twenty-three, and Twenty-four.
52 Geo. 3. c. 105	Militia Returns Act 1812	An Act the title of which begins with the words,—An Act to continue, amend, and extend the Provisions of an Act passed in the Forty-eighth Year,—and ends with the words,—Militia, for the Purpose of directing the Distribution and securing the due Application thereof.	So far as relates to the Acts— 48 Geo. 3. c. 107. 37 Geo. 3. c. 4. 43 Geo. 3. cc. 82, 83. 44 Geo. 3. cc. 56, 66. 47 Geo. 3. Sess. 2. c. 71. 49 Geo. 3. c. 53. 50 Geo. 3. c. 24. 51 Geo. 3. c. 20. Section Five, so far also as it relates to courts in the principality of Wales or of the county palatine of Chester.
52 Geo. 3. c. 111	Militia Pay (Great Britain) Act 1812	An Act for defraying the Charge of the Pay and Clothing of the Militia and Local Militia in Great Britain for the Year One thousand eight hundred and twelve.	The whole act.
52 Geo. 3. c. 112	Militia Pay (Ireland) Act 1812	An Act for defraying, until the Twenty-fifth Day of March One thousand eight hundred and thirteen, the Charge of the Pay and Clothing of the Militia of Ireland; and for making Allowances in certain Cases to Subaltern Officers of the said Militia during Peace.	The whole act.
52 Geo. 3. c. 113	Treasury Bills (Ireland) (No. 2) Act 1812	An Act for raising the Sum of One million eight hundred and sixty-six thousand Thirteen Shillings and Fourpence Irish Currency by Treasury Bills for the Service of Ireland for the Year One thousand eight hundred and twelve.	The whole act.
52 Geo. 3. c. 114	Exchequer Bills (No. 4) Act 1812	An Act to enable the Commissioners of His Majesty's Treasury to issue Exchequer Bills, on the Credit of such Aids or Supplies as have been or shall be granted by Parliament for the Service of Great Britain for the Year One thousand eight hundred and twelve.	The whole act.
52 Geo. 3. c. 121	Debts of East India Company Act 1812	An Act to authorize the Transfer to the East Indies of Debts originally contracted there on the Part of the East India Company, payable in England	Repealed as to all Her Majesty's Dominions.
52 Geo. 3. c. 122	Forces of East India Company Act 1812	An Act to remove Doubts as to an Act passed in the Fiftieth Year of the Reign of His present Majesty, relating to raising Men for the Service of the East India Company	Repealed as to all Her Majesty's Dominions.
52 Geo. 3. c. 125	Lotteries (No. 2) Act 1812	An Act for granting to His Majesty a Sum of Money to be raised by Lotteries.	The whole act.
52 Geo. 3. c. 127	Manufacture of Starch from Wheat, etc. Act 1812	An Act to prohibit, until the First Day of November One thousand eight hundred and twelve, the making of Starch, Hair Powder, and Blue, from Wheat and other Articles of Food; and for suspending Part of the Duties now payable on the Importation into Great Britain of Starch.	The whole act.
52 Geo. 3. c. 129	National Debt Commissioners Act 1812	An Act for amending Two Acts passed in the Forty-eighth and Forty-ninth Years of His present Majesty, for enabling the Commissioners for the Reduction of the National Debt to grant Life Annuities.	The whole act.
52 Geo. 3. c. 132	Unclaimed Prize Money, etc. Act 1812	An Act the title of which begins with the words,—An Act for explaining, amending, and extending the several Laws,—and ends with the words,—Pensions paid to the Widows of Officers of the Army.	The whole act.
52 Geo. 3. c. 133	Census (Ireland) Act 1812	An Act for taking an Account of the Population of Ireland, and of the Increase or Diminution thereof.	The whole act.
52 Geo. 3. c. 134	Butter Trade (Ireland) Act 1812	An Act for the better Regulation of the Butter Trade in Ireland.	Section One. Section Fourteen the words—" made otherwise than as herein directed, or" (wherever they occur)—"or not having the Staves, Head and Bottom thereof of the Thickness herein-after required,"—from "and" to "public Weighmaster or joint public Weighmasters, his or their Deputy or Deputies;"—from "and in case any" to "Discretion of such Mayor, Chief Magistrate or Justices, as the case may be;" and—from "and not give any Allowance for Soakage on any Cask,"—to "not made as herein, or,"—"or not having the Staves, Bottom and Head thereof of the Thickness herein after mentioned and required,"—"made or" and "or not having the Staves, Bottom and Head thereof of the Thickness herein after required,". Section Fifteen to "determine concerning the same;". Section Seventeen from "and that every" to "such Cask or Casks;". Section Eighteen. Section Nineteen, the words "and Allowance for Soakage" and "or Allowance for Soakage;". Section Twenty. Section Twenty-three, the words "not made conformable to this Act, or are"—"or have not the Staves, Head and Bottom thereof of the Thickness herein required,"—"to be made contrary to Law, or" and "or not to have the Staves, Head and Bottom thereof of the Thickness herein required,". Section Twenty-six from "And every Person" to "Evidence;". Section Thirty-two.
52 Geo. 3. c. 137	Loans or Exchequer Bills Act 1812	An Act for extending the Time for the Issue of certain Sums of Money advanced by way of Loan under an Act passed in the last Session of Parliament, for enabling His Majesty to direct the Issue of Exchequer Bills, to a limited Amount, for the Purposes and in the Manner therein mentioned.	The whole act.
52 Geo. 3. c. 143	Land Tax Certificates Forgery Act 1812	An Act for amending and reducing into One Act the Provisions contained in any Laws now in force imposing the Penalty of Death for any Act done in Breach of or in Resistance to any Part of the Laws for collecting His Majesty's Revenue in Great Britain.	Except Section Six.
52 Geo. 3. c. 146	Parochial Registers Act 1812	An Act for the better regulating and preserving Parish and other Registers of Births, Baptisms, Marriages, and Burials in England.	Section Eleven from "without Postage" to end of that Section. Sections Thirteen and Nineteen. Section Twenty from "always" to end of that Section.
52 Geo. 3. c. 148	Sale of Certain Stock Act 1812	An Act to enable the Keeper of His Majesty's Privy Purse for the Time being to dispose of and transfer all such Publick Stocks or Funds as now do or shall hereafter stand in his Name in the Books of the Governor and Company of the Bank of England in Trust for His Majesty.	The whole act.
52 Geo. 3. c. 149	Coffee, etc. Act 1812	An Act to regulate the Separation of damaged from sound Coffee, and to permit Dealers to send out any Quantity of Coffee not exceeding Eight Pounds Weight without Permit, until the End of Two Years from the passing of this Act.	The whole act.
52 Geo. 3. c. 151	Retirement of Officers on Half Pay Act 1812	An Act the title of which begins with the words,—An Act to extend the Provisions of an Act of the last Session,—and ends with the words,—Pensions and Allowances as are given to British Officers under the like Circumstances.	Section Three.
52 Geo. 3. c. 152	Agent General for Volunteers, etc. Act 1812	An Act to repeal an Act passed in the Forty-ninth Year of His present Majesty, intituled An Act for better regulating the Office of Agent General for Volunteers and Local Militia, and for the more effectually regulating the said Office.	The whole act.
52 Geo. 3. c. 154	Appropriation Act 1812	An Act the title of which begins with the words,—An Act for granting to His Majesty certain Sums of Money out of the Consolidated Fund,—and ends with the words,—appropriating the Supplies granted in this Session of Parliament.	The whole act.
52 Geo. 3. c. 155	Places of Religious Worship Act 1812	An Act to repeal certain Acts, and amend other Acts relating to Religious Worship and Assemblies, and Persons teaching or preaching therein.	Section One. Section Ten so far as it relates to courts in Wales or of the county palatine of Chester.
52 Geo. 3. c. 160	Peace Preservation (England) Act 1812	An Act to enable Justices of the Peace to order parochial Relief to Prisoners confined under Mesne Process for Debt in such Gaols as are not County Gaols.	The whole act.
52 Geo. 3. c. 162	Peace Preservation (England) Act 1812	An Act for the Preservation of the Public Peace in certain disturbed Counties in England; and to give, until the Twenty-fifth Day of March One thousand eight hundred and thirteen, additional Powers to Justices for that Purpose.	The whole act.
52 Geo. 3. c. 163	Insolvent Debtors Relief (Ireland) (No. 3) Act 1812	An Act for the Relief of certain Insolvent Debtors in Ireland.	The whole act.
52 Geo. 3. c. 164	Exchequer Bills (No. 5) Act 1812	An Act for enabling His Majesty to raise the Sum of Three Millions for the Service of Great Britain, and for applying the Sum of Two hundred thousand Pounds British Currency for the Service of Ireland.	The whole act.
52 Geo. 3. c. 165	Insolvent Debtors Relief (England) (No. 2) Act 1812	An Act for the Relief of certain Insolvent Debtors in England.	The whole act.
53 Geo. 3. c. 1	Use of Sugar in Brewing (Great Britain) (No. 2) Act 1812	An Act to continue, until the First Day of October One thousand eight hundred and thirteen, an Act of the last Session of Parliament, for allowing the Use of Sugar in Brewing Beer in Great Britain.	The whole act.
53 Geo. 3. c. 5	Gold Currency Act 1812	An Act the title of which begins with the words,—An Act to continue, until the Twenty-fifth Day of March,—and ends with the words,—staying Proceedings upon any Distress by Tender of such Notes.	The whole act.
53 Geo. 3. c. 6	Insolvent Debtors Relief (England) (No. 3) Act 1812	An Act to explain and amend an Act passed in the Fifty-second Year of the Reign of His present Majesty, intituled An Act for the Relief of certain Insolvent Debtors in England; and to enlarge the Powers of the same in certain Cases.	The whole act.
53 Geo. 3. c. 7	Distillation from Corn Prohibition, etc. Act 1812	An Act the title of which begins with the words,—An Act to continue until the Thirty-first Day of December,—and ends with the words,—Duties on Spirits made from Sugar in Ireland.	The whole act.
53 Geo. 3. c. 12	Indemnity (Order in Council West Indies Importation) Act 1812	An Act for indemnifying such Persons as have advised or acted under an Order in Council for allowing the Importation of certain Articles into the West Indies, and for permitting such Importation until the Thirtieth Day of June One thousand eight hundred and thirteen.	The whole act.
53 Geo. 3. c. 14	Care of King's Estate During his Illness Act 1812	An Act to explain so much of Two Acts, for regulating His Majesty's Household and other Purposes, as relates to the Powers of the Commissioners for the Care and Management of His Majesty's Real and Personal estate.	The whole act.
53 Geo. 3. c. 15	Duties on Malt, etc. (No. 2) Act 1812	An Act for continuing to His Majesty certain Duties on Malt, Sugar, Tobacco, and Snuff, in Great Britain; and on Pensions, Offices, and Personal Estates in England; for the Service of the Year One thousand eight hundred and thirteen.	The whole act.
53 Geo. 3. c. 16	Exchequer Bills (No. 6) Act 1812	An Act for raising the Sum of Ten millions five hundred thousand Pounds, by Exchequer Bills, for the Service of Great Britain for the Year One thousand eight hundred and thirteen.	The whole act.
53 Geo. 3. c. 17	Mutiny Act 1813	An Act for punishing Mutiny and Desertion; and for the better Payment of the Army and their Quarters.	The whole act.
53 Geo. 3. c. 23	Making of Starch Act 1813	An Act to repeal so much of an Act of this Session as continues the Prohibition of the making of Starch from Wheat and other Articles of Food.	The whole act.
53 Geo. 3. c. 24	Administration of Justice Act 1813	An Act to facilitate the Administration of Justice.	Section Four.
53 Geo. 3. c. 25	Marine Mutiny Act 1813	An Act for the regulating of His Majesty's Royal Marine Forces while on Shore.	The whole act.
53 Geo. 3. c. 26	Exchequer Bills Act 1813	An Act for raising the Sum of Five Millions, by Exchequer Bills, for the Service of Great Britain, for the Year One thousand eight hundred and thirteen.	The whole act.
53 Geo. 3. c. 27	Exchequer Bills (No. 2) Act 1813	An Act for raising the Sum of One million five hundred thousand Pounds, by Exchequer Bills, for the Service of Great Britain, for the Year One thousand eight hundred and thirteen.	The whole act.
53 Geo. 3. c. 28	Local Militia (England) Act 1813	An Act to explain and amend an Act, passed in the last Session of Parliament, for amending the Laws relating to the Local Militia in England.	Sections Four and Six.
53 Geo. 3. c. 29	Militia (Scotland) Act 1813	An Act to explain and amend an Act, passed in the last Session of Parliament, intituled An Act for amending the Laws relating to the Local Militia in Scotland.	Section One to "repealed; and,". Sections Four, Six, and Sixteen. Section Twenty to "thereof;". Section Twenty-one.
53 Geo. 3. c. 31	Exportation (No. 2) Act 1813	An Act the title of which begins with the words,—An Act for further continuing, until the Twenty-fifth Day of March,—and ends with the words,—Sugar, when the Duties imposed by an Act of the Forty-ninth Year of His present Majesty shall be suspended.	The whole act.
53 Geo. 3. c. 32	Exportation (No. 3) Act 1813	An Act to continue, until the Twenty-fifth Day of March One thousand eight hundred and fourteen, an Act for regulating the Drawbacks and Bounties on the Exportation of Sugar from Ireland.	The whole act.
53 Geo. 3. c. 35	National Debt Act 1813	An Act to alter and amend several Acts passed in His present Majesty's Reign, relating to the Redemption of the National Debt; and for making further Provision in respect thereof.	The whole act.
53 Geo. 3. c. 39	Transportation Act 1813	An Act to continue until the Twenty-fifth Day of March One thousand eight hundred and fourteen, several Laws relating to the Transportation of Felons and other Offenders to temporary Places of Confinement in England and Scotland.	The whole act.
53 Geo. 3. c. 40	Wages, etc., of Artificers, etc. Act 1813	An Act to repeal so much of several Acts, passed in England and Scotland respectively as empowers Justices of the Peace to rate Wages, or set Prices of Work, for Artificers Labourers, or Craftsmen.	The whole act.
53 Geo. 3. c. 42	Exchequer Bills (No. 3) Act 1813	An Act to enable the Commissioners of His Majesty's Treasury to issue Exchequer Bills, on the Credit of such Aids or Supplies as have been or shall be granted by Parliament for the Service of Great Britain for the Year One thousand eight hundred and thirteen.	The whole act.
53 Geo. 3. c. 43	Quartering of Soldiers Act 1813	An Act for increasing the Rates of Subsistence to be paid to Innkeepers and others on quartering Soldiers.	The whole act.
53 Geo. 3. c. 45	Exportation (No. 5) Act 1813	An Act for repealing Two Acts which prohibit the Exportation of Brass and other Metal from England.	The whole act.
53 Geo. 3. c. 46	Butter Trade (Ireland) Act 1813	An Act for the further Regulation of the Butter Trade of Ireland.	The whole act.
53 Geo. 3. c. 54	Battle-axe Guards (Ireland) Act 1813	An Act to amend an Act made in the Forty-ninth Year of His Majesty's Reign, intituled An Act for the further Prevention of the Sale and Brokerage of Offices.	The whole act.
53 Geo. 3. c. 64	Court of Session Act 1813	An Act for the better Regulation of the Court of Session in Scotland.	Sections Eight, Thirteen, Fifteen, Sixteen, and Eighteen.
53 Geo. 3. c. 65	Payment of Creditors (Scotland) Act 1813	An Act for continuing, until the Twenty-fifth Day of July One thousand eight hundred and fourteen, an Act made in the Thirty-third Year of His present Majesty, for rendering the Payment of Creditors more equal and expeditious in Scotland.	The whole act.
53 Geo. 3. c. 67	Exportation and Importation Act 1813	An Act for empowering His Majesty to authorize the Importation and Exportation of certain Articles into and from the West Indies, South America, and Newfoundland, until Six Weeks after the Commencement of the next Session of Parliament.	The whole act.
53 Geo. 3. c. 70	Glass, etc., Duties Act 1813	An Act to authorize the Sellers of Glass, Hides, Tobacco, and Snuff, to charge the additional Duties on any such Articles ordered before but not delivered until after the Fifth Day of July One thousand eight hundred and twelve.	The whole act.
53 Geo. 3. c. 73	Duties, etc., on Tobacco (Ireland) Act 1813	An Act to declare that the Duties of Excise on Drawbacks on Tobacco made and payable in Ireland by Tobacco by an Act of this Session, are payable according to the Amount thereof in British Currency.	The whole act.
53 Geo. 3. c. 74	Duty on Malt (Ireland) Act 1813	An Act to provide for the better Collection of the Duty on Malt made in Ireland.	The whole act.
53 Geo. 3. c. 76	Highways (Ireland) Act 1813	An Act to extend the Provisions of an Act, passed in the Forty-ninth Year of His present Majesty, for amending the Irish Road Acts, so far as the same relate to the Appointment of Supervisors and Parish Coach Roads, to all Roads made and repaired by Presentment.	The whole act.
53 Geo. 3. c. 78	Arms (Ireland) Act 1813	An Act to continue for Two Years, and from thence until the End of the then next Session of Parliament, Two Acts made in the Forty-seventh and Fiftieth Years of His present Majesty's reign, for the preventing improper Persons from having Arms in Ireland.	The whole act.
53 Geo. 3. c. 79	Militia Pay (Ireland) Act 1813	An Act for defraying the Charge of the Pay and Clothing of the Militia of Ireland; and for making Allowances in certain Cases to Subaltern Officers of the said Militia during Peace.	The whole act.
53 Geo. 3. c. 80	Treasury Bills (Ireland) Act 1813	An Act for raising the Sum of Three hundred and thirty thousand Pounds by Treasury Bills for the Service of Ireland, for the Year One thousand eight hundred and thirteen.	The whole act.
53 Geo. 3. c. 81	Militia Act 1813	An Act to amend several Acts relating to the Militia, and to enlisting Men from the Militia into His Majesty's Regular Forces.	Sections Two and Four to Nine.
53 Geo. 3. c. 83	Diet of Soldiers on a March Act 1813	An Act to increase the Allowance to Innkeepers for Diet furnished to Soldiers on a March.	The whole act.
53 Geo. 3. c. 88	Excise (No. 3) Act 1813	An Act to substitute a Declaration in lieu of an Oath in the Verification of the Books of Persons dealing in certain Exciseable Articles.	The whole act.
53 Geo. 3. c. 89	Parliamentary Writs Act 1813	An Act for the more regular Conveyance of Writs for the Election of Members to serve in Parliament.	Section Two from "the Chancellor" to "Cinque Ports,". Section Five from "and that the" to end of that Section.
53 Geo. 3. c. 90	Militia Allowances Act 1813	An Act the title of which begins with the words,—An Act to revive and continue, until the Twenty-fifth Day of March,—and ends with the words,—Militia of England, disembodied under an Act of the same Session of Parliament.	The whole act.
53 Geo. 3. c. 91	Militia Allowances (No. 2) Act 1813	An Act for making Allowances in certain Cases to Subaltern Officers of the Militia in Great Britain while disembodied.	The whole act.
53 Geo. 3. c. 93	Lotteries Act 1813	An Act for granting to His Majesty a Sum of Money to be raised by Lotteries.	The whole act.
53 Geo. 3. c. 94	Duty on Spirits (Ireland) Act 1813	An Act to grant an additional Duty of Excise on Spirits made or distilled from Corn or Grain in Ireland.	The whole act.
53 Geo. 3. c. 96	Militia Pay (Great Britain) Act 1813	An Act for defraying the Charge of the Pay and Clothing of the Militia and Local Militia in Great Britain, for the Year One thousand eight hundred and thirteen.	The whole act.
53 Geo. 3. c. 99	Offences Committed by Soldiers Act 1813	An Act for the more speedy and effectual Trial and Punishment of Offences committed by Soldiers detached in Places beyond the Seas out of His Majesty's Dominions.	The whole act.
53 Geo. 3. c. 101	Royal Canal Company (Ireland) Act 1813	An Act the title of which begins with the words,—An Act to dissolve the Corporation of the Royal Canal Company in Ireland,—and ends with the words,—Canal from Dublin to Tarmonbury on the River Shannon.	The whole act.
53 Geo. 3. c. 102	Insolvent Debtors (England) Act 1813	An Act for the Relief of Insolvent Debtors in England.	The whole act.
53 Geo. 3. c. 109	Stamps Act 1813	An Act to continue, until the First Day of August One thousand eight hundred and fourteen, several Laws relating to the Duties on Glass made in Great Britain.	The whole act.
53 Geo. 3. c. 110	Importation into Isle of Man Act 1813	An Act the title of which begins with the words,—An Act to suspend the Exportation of Foreign Spirits from Great Britain to the Isle of Man,—and ends with the words,—Fifth Day of July One thousand eight hundred and fourteen.	The whole act.
53 Geo. 3. c. 118	Exchequer Bills (No. 4) Act 1813	An Act for raising the Sum of Five millions six hundred and seventy thousand and seven hundred Pounds, by Exchequer Bills, for the Service of Great Britain, for the Year One thousand eight hundred and thirteen.	The whole act.
53 Geo. 3. c. 119	Exchequer Bills (No. 5) Act 1813	An Act for raising the Sum of One Million, by Exchequer Bills, for the Service of Great Britain, for the Year One thousand eight hundred and thirteen.	The whole act.
53 Geo. 3. c. 122	Spencer Perceval's Pensions Act 1813	An Act for confirming the Renunciation made by Spencer Perceval, Esquire, of his Pensions on his taking the Office of a Teller of the Exchequer.	The whole act.
53 Geo. 3. c. 123	Land Tax Redemption Act 1813	An Act to amend and render more effectual several Acts passed for the Redemption and Sale of the Land Tax.	Sections Two and Five to Seven. Section Twelve from "the said last" to "aforesaid,". Section Thirteen so far as it relates to additional assessments. Section Fourteen from "and the" to end of that Section. Sections Fifteen and Eighteen. Section Twenty-two from "or all refuse" to "any Land Tax,". Section Twenty-three. Section Thirty to "and that". Sections Thirty-one to Thirty-nine, Forty-one to Forty-three, and Forty-five. Schedules [C.] and [D.]
53 Geo. 3. c. 127	Ecclesiastical Courts Act 1813	An Act for the better Regulation of Ecclesiastical Courts in England, and for the more easy Recovery of Church Rates and Tithes.	Section Seven, except so far as any rate may still be enforced by process of law. Section Eight from "and also" to end of that Section. Section Ten.
53 Geo. 3. c. 130	Inquiry into Public Offices (Ireland) Act 1813	An Act the title of which begins with the words,—An Act to continue, until the First Day of January,—and ends with the words,—accounting for Public Money in Ireland.	The whole act.
53 Geo. 3. c. 131	Court Houses (Ireland) Act 1813	An Act to make further Regulations for the building and repairing of Court Houses and Sessions Houses in Ireland	Repealed, except as to the county of the city of Dublin.
53 Geo. 3. c. 132	Militia (Tower Hamlets) Act 1813	An Act to extend the Services of the Militia of the Tower Hamlets to all Parts of the United Kingdom.	Sections One and Three.
53 Geo. 3. c. 135	Bringing of Coals to London, etc. Act 1813	An Act to continue, until the First Day of August One thousand eight hundred and fifteen, Two Acts of the Forty-fifth and Fiftieth Years of His present Majesty, allowing the bringing of Coals, Culm, and Cinders to London and Westminster by Inland Navigation.	The whole act.
53 Geo. 3. c. 136	Appropriation Act 1813	An Act the title of which begins with the words,—An Act for granting to His Majesty certain Sums of Money out of the Consolidated Fund,—and ends with the words,—appropriating the Supplies granted in this Session of Parliament.	The whole act.
53 Geo. 3. c. 138	Insolvent Debtors (Ireland) Act 1813	An Act for the Relief of Insolvent Debtors in Ireland.	The whole act.
53 Geo. 3. c. 139	Exemption of Bankers from Penalties Act 1813	An Act the title of which begins with the words,—An Act for the Relief of certain Bankers and others from certain Penalties,—and ends with the words,—Imitation of the Notes or Bills of the said Governor and Company.	The whole act.
53 Geo. 3. c. 142	Land Tax Act 1813	An Act to explain and amend several Acts relative to the Land Tax.	Section Two from "for the previous" to "gratis,". Sections Six and Eight.
53 Geo. 3. c. 144	Inland Navigation (Ireland) Act 1813	An Act to amend an Act of the Parliament of Ireland of the Fortieth Year of His present Majesty, for promoting Inland Navigation in Ireland.	Section Two.
53 Geo. 3. c. 146	Highways (Ireland) (No. 2) Act 1813	An Act to amend an Act made in the Forty-fifth Year of His present Majesty, intituled An Act to amend the Laws for improving and keeping in Repair the Post Roads in Ireland, and for rendering the Conveyance of Letters by His Majesty's Post Office more secure and expeditious.	The whole act.
53 Geo. 3. c. 151	Registry of Admiralty Court Act 1813	An Act for regulating the Office of Registrar of the High Court of Admiralty and High Court of Appeals for Prizes.	The whole act.
53 Geo. 3. c. 152	Westminster Election Act 1813	An Act the title of which begins with the words,—An Act to continue, until the First Day of January,—and ends with the words,—Expenses of Hustings and Poll Clerks, so far as regards the City of Westminster.	The whole act.
53 Geo. 3. c. 153	Judges' Pensions Act 1813	An Act to enable His Majesty to grant additional Annuities to the Judges of the Courts in Westminster Hall, on their Resignation of their Offices.	Section Two from "except" to "and Duties,".
53 Geo. 3. c. 154	Kilmainham Hospital (Pensions Commutation) Act 1813	An Act to render valid and to authorize the Payment and granting of certain Pensions at Kilmainham Hospital; and to empower the Commissioners of the said Hospital to grant Annuities in lieu of Money in certain Cases.	Sections One and Two.
53 Geo. 3. c. 155	Charge of Certain Annuities Act 1813	An Act the title of which begins with the words,—An Act for continuing to the East India Company,—and ends with the words,—Trade to and from the Places within the Limits of the said Company's Charter.	Sections One to Thirty-two, Forty, Forty-one, Forty-four to Forty-eight, and Fifty-four to Seventy-six. Section Seventy-seven from and after the 1st day of June 1874. Sections Seventy-eight, Eighty, Eighty-one, Eighty-three, Eighty-seven, Eighty-eight, Ninety to Ninety-two, Ninety-five, Ninety-seven to Ninety-nine, One hundred and one, One hundred and four to One hundred and nine, and One hundred and twelve to One hundred and twenty-two. Section One hundred and twenty-four so far as it applies to British India. Section One hundred and twenty-five. Repealed as to all Her Majesty's Dominions.
53 Geo. 3. c. 157	Grant of John Palmer, Esquire (Post Office Services) Act 1813	An Act for granting the Sum of Fifty thousand Pounds to John Palmer, Esquire, in Consideration of the Public Services performed by the said John Palmer, in the Improvement of the Post Office Revenue.	The whole act.
53 Geo. 3. c. 160	Doctrine of the Trinity Act 1813	An Act to relieve Persons who impugn the Doctrine of the Holy Trinity from certain Penalties.	The whole act.
53 Geo. 3. c. 161	Exchequer Bills, etc. Act 1813	An Act for enabling His Majesty to raise the Sum of Five Millions, for the Service of Great Britain; and for applying the Sum of Two hundred thousand Pounds British Currency for the Service of Ireland.	The whole act.
53 Geo. 3. c. 162	Imprisonment with Hard Labour Act 1813	An Act the title of which begins with the words,—An Act to explain and amend a certain Provision respecting Persons convicted of Felony without Benefit of Clergy,—and ends with the words,—Provisions in lieu thereof.	The whole act.
54 Geo. 3. c. 2	Duties on Malt, etc. Act 1813	An Act for continuing to His Majesty certain Duties on Malt, Sugar, Tobacco, and Snuff, in Great Britain; and on Pensions, Offices, and Personal Estates, in England; for the Service of the Year One thousand eight hundred and fourteen.	The whole act.
54 Geo. 3. c. 6	Actions Against Spiritual Persons Act 1813	An Act to stay, until the Twentieth Day of April One thousand eight hundred and fourteen, Proceedings in Actions under an Act passed in the Forty-third Year of His present Majesty, to amend the Laws relating to Spiritual Persons.	The whole act.
54 Geo. 3. c. 7	Exportation (No. 8) Act 1813	An Act to continue, until the Twenty-fifth Day of March One thousand eight hundred and fifteen, and amend an Act for regulating the Drawbacks and Bounties on the Exportation of Sugar from Ireland.	The whole act.
54 Geo. 3. c. 9	Distillation of Spirits (Scotland) Act 1813	An Act for fixing the Commencement and Termination of Licences to be granted for the Distillation of Spirits from Corn or Grain in Scotland.	The whole act.
54 Geo. 3. c. 10	Militia (No. 3) Act 1813	An Act to amend an Act passed in the Fifty-first Year of the Reign of His present Majesty, intituled An Act to permit the Interchange of the British and Irish Militias respectively.	The whole act.
54 Geo. 3. c. 13	Aid to Russia, etc. Act 1813	An Act for giving Effect to certain Engagements of His Majesty with the Emperor of all the Russias and the King of Prussia, for furnishing a Part of the pecuniary Succours for assisting His Majesty's said Allies, in supporting the Expenses of the War with France.	The whole act.
54 Geo. 3. c. 18	Exchequer Bills (No. 6) Act 1813	An Act for raising the Sum of Ten millions five hundred thousand Pounds, by Exchequer Bills, for the Service of Great Britain for the Year One thousand eight hundred and fourteen.	The whole act.
54 Geo. 3. c. 19	Local Militia (Great Britain) Act 1813	An Act to enable His Majesty to accept the Services of the Local Militia, out of their Counties, under certain Restrictions, and until the Twenty-fifth Day of March One thousand eight hundred and fifteen.	The whole act.
54 Geo. 3. c. 22	Peace Preservation Act 1813	An Act to continue, until the Twenty-fifth Day of March One thousand eight hundred and fifteen, an Act of the Fifty-second Year of His present Majesty, for the more effectual Preservation of the Peace, by enforcing the Duties of Watching and Warding.	The whole act.
54 Geo. 3. c. 23	Insolvent Debtors (England) (No. 2) Act 1813	An Act to amend an Act of the Fifty-third Year of His Majesty's Reign, intituled An Act for the Relief of Insolvent Debtors in England.	The whole act.
54 Geo. 3. c. 24	Bounties, etc., on Sugar Act 1813	An Act the title of which begins with the words,—An Act for further continuing until the Twenty-fifth Day of March,—and ends with the words,—Sugar, when the Duties imposed by an Act of the Forty-ninth Year of His present Majesty shall be suspended.	The whole act.
54 Geo. 3. c. 25	Mutiny (No. 2) Act 1813	An Act for punishing Mutiny and Desertion; and for the better Payment of the Army and their Quarters.	The whole act.
54 Geo. 3. c. 26	Customs (No. 5) Act 1813	An Act for repealing the Duties of Customs on Madder imported into Great Britain, and for granting other Duties in lieu thereof; to continue in force until the Fifth Day of January One thousand eight hundred and seventeen.	The whole act.
54 Geo. 3. c. 27	Customs (No. 6) Act 1813	An Act to rectify a Mistake in an Act of the present Session of Parliament, for repealing the Duties of Customs on Madder imported into Great Britain, and for granting other Duties in lieu thereof.	The whole act.
54 Geo. 3. c. 28	Insolvent Debtors Relief (England) Act 1813	An Act for the Relief of certain Insolvent Debtors in England.	The whole act.
54 Geo. 3. c. 29	Customs (No. 7) Act 1813	An Act to charge an additional Duty of Customs on Brandy imported into Great Britain for the Purpose of Exportation, and which shall be taken out of Warehouse for Home Consumption, before the Thirty-first Day of March One thousand eight hundred and fourteen.	The whole act.
54 Geo. 3. c. 30	Transportation (No. 2) Act 1813	An Act the title of which begins with the words,—An Act to continue until the Twenty-fifth Day of March,—and ends with the words,—removal of Offenders to temporary places of Confinement in England and Scotland.	The whole act.
54 Geo. 3. c. 31	Marine Mutiny (No. 2) Act 1813	An Act for the regulating of His Majesty's Royal Marine Forces while on Shore.	The whole act.
54 Geo. 3. c. 33	Peace Preservation (Ireland) Act 1813	An Act the title of which begins with the words,—An Act to continue, until the Twenty-fifth Day of March,—and ends with the words,—Preservation of the Peace within Counties at large, as amended by an Act of the Thirtysixth of His Majesty.	The whole act.
54 Geo. 3. c. 35	East India Trade (No. 2) Act 1813	An Act to extend and amend the provisions relating to the Places within the Limits of the Charter of the East India Company, in Ships not of British-built, until the First Day of January One thousand eight hundred and fifteen.	The whole act.
54 Geo. 3. c. 38	City of London Militia (No. 2) Act 1813	An Act for allowing a certain proportion of the London Militia to enlist into the Regular Forces for the vigorous Prosecution of the War; also, a certain Proportion to enlist annually into the Regular Forces; and for augmenting the said Militia.	The whole act.
54 Geo. 3. c. 39	Exchequer Bills (No. 7) Act 1813	An Act for raising the Sum of Five Millions by Exchequer Bills, for the Service of Great Britain, for the Year One thousand eight hundred and fourteen.	The whole act.
54 Geo. 3. c. 40	Exportation (No. 9) Act 1813	An Act to remove Doubts respecting the Payment of Drawback on the Exportation of Foreign Wine in certain Cases.	The whole act.
54 Geo. 3. c. 41	Importation (No. 3) Act 1813	An Act to continue, until the First Day of July One thousand eight hundred and fourteen, an Act made in the Forty-ninth Year of His present Majesty's Reign, to suspend the Importation of British or Irish-made Spirits into Great Britain and Ireland respectively.	The whole act.
54 Geo. 3. c. 44	Actions Against Spiritual Persons Act 1814	An Act the title of which begins with the words,—An Act to continue, until the Twentieth Day of May,—and ends with the words,—Forty-third Year of His present Majesty, to amend the Laws relating to Spiritual Persons.	The whole act.
54 Geo. 3. c. 47	Coffee, etc. Act 1814	An Act the title of which begins with the words,—An Act to continue, until the Twenty-fifth Day of March,—and ends with the words,—Dealers to send out any Quantity of Coffee not exceeding Eight Pounds Weight, without Permit.	The whole act.
54 Geo. 3. c. 49	Trade of West Indies, etc. Act 1814	An Act the title of which begins with the words,—An Act to revive and continue, until the Expiration of Nine Months,—and ends with the words,—Articles into and from the West Indies, South America, and Newfoundland.	The whole act.
54 Geo. 3. c. 51	Importation Act 1814	An Act to revive and further continue, until Nine Months after the Conclusion of the present War, an Act of the Seventh Year of King George the Second, for the free Importation of Cochineal and Indigo.	The whole act.
54 Geo. 3. c. 52	Gold Currency Act 1814	An Act the title of which begins with the words,—An Act to revive and continue, during the Continuance of any Act,—and ends with the words,—greater Value than the Current Value of such Coin; and for other Purposes therein mentioned.	The whole act.
54 Geo. 3. c. 53	Exchequer Bills Act 1814	An Act to enable the Commissioners of His Majesty's Treasury to issue Exchequer Bills, on the Credit of such Aids or Supplies as have been or shall be granted by Parliament for the Service of Great Britain for the Year One thousand eight hundred and fourteen.	The whole act.
54 Geo. 3. c. 54	Suits Against Spiritual Persons Act 1814	An Act the title of which begins with the words,—An Act to discontinue Proceedings in certain Actions,—and ends with the words,—An Act of the present Session of Parliament, for staying Proceedings under the said Act.	The whole act.
54 Geo. 3. c. 55	Quartering of Soldiers Act 1814	An Act for fixing the Rates of Subsistence to be paid to Innkeepers and others on quartering Soldiers.	The whole act.
54 Geo. 3. c. 56	Sculpture Copyright Act 1814	An Act to amend and render more effectual an Act of His present Majesty, for encouraging the Art of making new Models and Casts of Busts, and other Things therein mentioned; and for giving further Encouragement to such Arts.	The last Section from "excepting" to end.
54 Geo. 3. c. 57	Exportation Act 1814	An Act the title of which begins with the words,—An Act to repeal the Schedule annexed to an Act of the Forty-fifth Year,—and ends with the words,—Articles of the British Plantations, to continue until the Fifth Day of April One thousand eight hundred and fifteen.	The whole act.
54 Geo. 3. c. 58	Protection of Trade During Hostilities Act 1814	An Act to continue, during the present Hostilities with the United States of America, an Act of the Forty-third Year of His present Majesty, for the better Protection of the Trade of the United Kingdom.	The whole act.
54 Geo. 3. c. 61	Public Office in Colony Act 1814	An Act the title of which begins with the words,—An Act to authorize well disposed Persons,—and ends with the words,—discharge the Duty thereof in Person, and behave well therein.	The last Section to "and that". Repealed as to all Her Majesty's Dominions.
54 Geo. 3. c. 62	County Infirmaries (Ireland) Act 1814	An Act to amend several Acts for erecting or establishing Public Infirmaries or Hospitals, in Ireland, so far as relates to the Surgeons and Apothecaries of such Infirmaries or Hospitals.	Sections One to Three.
54 Geo. 3. c. 68	Ecclesiastical Proctors (Ireland) Act 1814	An Act for the better regulation of Ecclesiastical Courts in Ireland; and for the more easy Recovery of Church Rates and Tithes.	Except Section Nine to "such deceased Proctor or Proctors;" and Sections Ten, Twelve, and Fourteen.
54 Geo. 3. c. 70	Crown Lands Act 1814	An Act for the further Improvement of the Land Revenue of the Crown.	The whole act.
54 Geo. 3. c. 71	Manufacture of Maidstone Geneva Act 1814	An Act to revive and continue, until the Fifth Day of July One thousand eight hundred and nineteen, the Manufacture of Maidstone Geneva.	The whole act.
54 Geo. 3. c. 73	Excise Act 1814	An Act to continue, until the Fifth Day of July One thousand eight hundred and fifteen, certain Additional Duties of Excise in Great Britain.	The whole act.
54 Geo. 3. c. 74	Lotteries Act 1814	An Act for granting to His Majesty a Sum of Money to be raised by Lotteries.	The whole act.
54 Geo. 3. c. 75	Treasury Bills (Ireland) Act 1814	An Act for raising the Sum of One Million seven hundred and sixteen thousand six hundred and sixty-six Pounds Thirteen Shillings and Fourpence, Irish Currency, by Treasury Bills, for the Service of Ireland, for the Year One thousand eight hundred and fourteen.	The whole act.
54 Geo. 3. c. 78	Removal of Wool Act 1814	An Act to repeal so much of an Act passed in the Ninth and Tenth Year of the Reign of King William the Third, and of another Act passed in the Twenty-eighth Year of His present Majesty, as respects the Removal of the Gravel within a certain Distance of the Sea.	The whole act.
54 Geo. 3. c. 79	Exchequer Bills (No. 2) Act 1814	An Act for raising the Sum of Six Millions by Exchequer Bills, for the Service of Great Britain, for the Year One thousand eight hundred and fourteen.	The whole act.
54 Geo. 3. c. 80	Exchequer Bills (No. 3) Act 1814	An Act for raising the Sum of One million five hundred thousand Pounds, by Exchequer Bills, for the Service of Great Britain for the Year One thousand eight hundred and fourteen.	The whole act.
54 Geo. 3. c. 81	Importation and Exportation Act 1814	An Act the title of which begins with the words,—An Act to continue until the Fifth day of July,—and ends with the words,—Merchandise into and from Ireland, and to make further Regulations for securing the Collection of the said Duties.	The whole act.
54 Geo. 3. c. 83	Exchequer (Ireland) Act 1814	An Act for the more effectual Regulation of the Receipts and Issues of His Majesty's Treasury, and for securing the due Application of Money coming into the Hands of the Public Accountants in Ireland.	The whole act.
54 Geo. 3. c. 92	Probate and Legacy Duties (Ireland) Act 1814	An Act to secure the Payment of Stamp Duties on Probates and Letters of Administration, and on Receipts for Property obtained by Legacy, or Intestacy, in Ireland.	Sections One, Six, Forty to Forty-two, and Forty-four. Except as to Annuities the duty on which became payable on or before the 19th day of May 1853, so much of the Schedule as contains Tables of the values of annuities and Rules for inferring the values of annuities.
54 Geo. 3. c. 94	Annuities to Retired Judges (Scotland) Act 1814	An Act to grant additional Annuities to Judges of the Courts of Session, Justiciary, and Exchequer, in Scotland, who had resigned their Offices before the last Augmentation of Salaries granted to the Judges of those Courts.	The whole act.
54 Geo. 3. c. 96	Apprentices Act 1814	An Act to amend an Act passed in the Fifth Year of Queen Elizabeth, intituled An Act containing divers Orders for Artificers, Labourers, Servants of Husbandry, and Apprentices.	Section One.
54 Geo. 3. c. 98	Accounts of Expenditure in France Act 1814	An Act to empower the Auditor General of the Accounts in Spain and Portugal to examine Accounts of Public Expenditure in France.	The whole act.
54 Geo. 3. c. 99	Restriction on Cash Payments Act 1814	An Act to continue, until the Twenty-fifth Day of March One thousand eight hundred and fifteen, an Act of the Forty-fourth Year of His present Majesty, to continue the Restrictions contained in several Acts on Payments of Cash by the Bank of England.	The whole act.
54 Geo. 3. c. 100	Exportation (No. 2) Act 1814	An Act the title of which begins with the words,—An Act to repeal the Schedule annexed to an Act of the Forty-seventh Year,—and ends with the words,—Articles of the British Plantations; to continue until the Fifth Day of April One thousand eight hundred and fifteen.	The whole act.
54 Geo. 3. c. 105	Duties, etc., India Act 1814	An Act to remove Doubts as to the Duties and Taxes heretofore imposed and levied under the Authority of the several Governments in the East Indies	Repealed as to all Her Majesty's Dominions.
54 Geo. 3. c. 107	Poor Apprentices, etc. Act 1814	An Act to render valid certain Indentures for the binding of Parish Apprentices, and Certificates of the Settlement of Poor Persons.	The whole act.
54 Geo. 3. c. 108	Burying in Woollen Act 1814	An Act to repeal Two Acts of the Thirtieth and Thirty-second Years of King Charles the Second, for burying in Woollen, and for indemnifying all Persons against Penalties for Offences committed against the said Acts.	The whole act.
54 Geo. 3. c. 111	Importation etc. Act 1814	An Act to continue certain Acts of the Parliament of Ireland for preventing the Importation of Arms, Gunpowder, and Ammunition, and the making, removing, selling, and keeping of Gunpowder, Arms, and Ammunition, without Licence.	The whole act.
54 Geo. 3. c. 112	Hospitals (Ireland) Act 1814	An Act for the further Encouragement of Fever Hospitals in Ireland.	The whole act.
54 Geo. 3. c. 114	Insolvent Debtors (Ireland) Act 1814	An Act to amend an Act, made in the last Session of Parliament for the Relief of Insolvent Debtors in Ireland.	The whole act.
54 Geo. 3. c. 115	Burning of Land (Ireland) Act 1814	An Act to amend an Act of the Parliament of Ireland, for preventing the pernicious Practice of burning Land, and for the more effectual destroying of Vermin.	The whole act.
54 Geo. 3. c. 123	Hop Trade Act 1814	An Act to amend an Act of the Thirty-ninth and Fortieth Year of His present Majesty, to prevent Frauds and Abuses in the Trade of Hops.	Section Two from "or shall before" to "Place," and from "to be recovered" to end of that Section.
54 Geo. 3. c. 125	Importation (No. 3) Act 1814	An Act to continue, until the end of the next Session of Parliament, an Act made in the Forty-sixth Year of His present Majesty, for permitting the Importation of Masts, Yards, Bowsprits, and Timber for Naval Purposes, from the British Colonies in North America.	The whole act.
54 Geo. 3. c. 127	Exportation (No. 3) Act 1814	An Act to permit the Exportation to Foreign Parts from Scotland and Ireland of Linen Cloth without Stamps.	The whole act.
54 Geo. 3. c. 130	Restriction on Cash Payments (No. 2) Act 1814	An Act to continue, until Three Months after the ceasing of any Restriction imposed on the Bank of England from issuing Cash in Payment, the several Acts for confirming and continuing the Restrictions on Payments in Cash by the Bank of Ireland.	The whole act.
54 Geo. 3. c. 132	House Duty (Ireland) Act 1814	An Act to repeal the Duty payable in Ireland on certain Houses or Tenements under the annual Value of Ten Pounds.	The whole act.
54 Geo. 3. c. 134	East India Trade, etc. Act 1814	An Act the title of which begins with the words,—An Act to continue until the First Day of January,—and ends with the words,—Asiatic Seamen arriving in this Kingdom.	The whole act.
54 Geo. 3. c. 135	Highways (Ireland) Act 1814	An Act to further explain and amend an Act of the Fiftieth Year of His present Majesty's Reign, for repealing certain Parts of several Acts relating to the limiting the Number of Persons to be carried by Stage Coaches in Ireland.	The whole act.
54 Geo. 3. c. 149	Spirit Trade Act 1814	An Act to regulate, until the end of the next Session of Parliament, the Trade in Spirits between Great Britain and Ireland, reciprocally.	The whole act.
54 Geo. 3. c. 152	Carriage of Gunpowder (Great Britain) Act 1814	An Act to repeal certain Duties of Excise on Licences made in the Twelfth Year of the Reign of His present Majesty, for regulating the making, keeping, and carriage of Gunpowder within Great Britain.	The whole act.
54 Geo. 3. c. 157	Office of Works Act 1814	An Act for the better Regulation of the Conduct of the Business of the Office of Works, and the Expenditure thereof.	The whole act.
54 Geo. 3. c. 158	Incitement to Mutiny Act 1814	An Act to continue for One Year certain Acts for the better Prevention and Punishment of Attempts to seduce Persons serving in His Majesty's Forces by Sea or Land from their Duty and Allegiance to His Majesty, or to incite them to Mutiny or Disobedience.	The whole act.
54 Geo. 3. c. 159	Harbours Act 1814	An Act for the better Regulation of the several Ports, Harbours, Roadsteads, Sounds, Channels, Bays, and Navigable Rivers in the United Kingdom, and of His Majesty's Docks, Dock Yards, Arsenals, Wharfs, Moorings, and Stores therein, and for repealing several Acts passed for that Purpose.	Section One. Section Twenty-seven so far as it relates to venue and pits of it; general issue, but as to this section so far only as it relates to Ireland.
54 Geo. 3. c. 160	Annuity to Princess of Wales Act 1814	An Act to enable His Majesty to settle an Annuity upon Her Royal Highness the Princess of Wales during the Joint Lives of His Majesty and of Her Royal Highness.	The whole act.
54 Geo. 3. c. 162	Annuity to Lord Beresford, etc. Act 1814	An Act for settling and securing an Annuity on Lord Beresford, and the Persons to whom the Title of Lord Beresford shall descend, in Consideration of his eminent Services.	The whole act.
54 Geo. 3. c. 165	Annuity to Lord Hill Act 1814	An Act for settling and securing an Annuity on Lord Hill, and the Persons to whom the Title of Lord Hill shall descend, in Consideration of his eminent Services.	The whole act.
54 Geo. 3. c. 166	Annuity to Lord Lynedoch Act 1814	An Act for settling and securing an Annuity on Lord Lynedoch, and the Persons to whom the Title of Lord Lynedoch shall descend, in Consideration of his eminent Services.	The whole act.
54 Geo. 3. c. 167	Appropriation Act 1814	An Act the title of which begins with the words,—An Act for applying a certain Sum of Money arisen or to arise from certain Duties,—and ends with the words,—appropriating the Supplies granted in this Session of Parliament.	The whole act.
54 Geo. 3. c. 168	Informal Attestation of Certain Deeds Act 1814	An Act to amend the Laws respecting the Attestation of Instruments of Appointment and Revocation made in exercise of certain Powers in Deeds, Wills, and other Instruments.	The whole act.
54 Geo. 3. c. 170	Poor Relief Act 1814	An Act to repeal certain Provisions in Local Acts for the Maintenance and Regulation of the Poor, and to make other Provisions in relation thereto.	Sections Eight and Nine.
54 Geo. 3. c. 171	Customs, etc. Act 1814	An Act to empower the Commissioners of His Majesty's Treasury to restore Seizures, or remit or mitigate Fines, Penalties, or Forfeitures incurred concerning any Laws relating to the Customs or Excise or Navigation and Trade of Great Britain.	The whole act.
54 Geo. 3. c. 172	Duties on Spirits (Scotland) Act 1814	An Act for repealing the Duties payable in Scotland upon Distillers Wash, Spirits, and Licences, and for granting other Duties in lieu thereof.	The whole act.
54 Geo. 3. c. 173	Land Tax Redemption Act 1814	An Act to alter and amend certain of the Powers and Provisions of several Acts passed for the Redemption and Sale of the Land Tax, and for making further Provision for the Redemption thereof.	Sections One to Three, Five, Seven, Ten, and Eleven. Section Fourteen from "entering" to "passing this Act;". Section Eighteen.
54 Geo. 3. c. 175	Residence on Benefices, etc. (England) Act 1814	An Act to explain and amend several Acts relating to Spiritual Persons holding of Farms, and for enforcing the Residence of such Persons on their Benefices in England, for One Year, and from thence until Six Weeks after the Meeting of the then next Session of Parliament.	The whole act.
54 Geo. 3. c. 176	Local Militia Pay (Great Britain) Act 1814	An Act for defraying the Charge of the Pay and Clothing of the Local Militia in Great Britain for the Year One thousand eight hundred and fourteen.	The whole act.
54 Geo. 3. c. 177	Militia Pay (Ireland) Act 1814	An Act for defraying the Charge of the Pay and Clothing of the Militia of Ireland, and for making Allowances in certain Cases to Subaltern Officers of the said Militia during Peace.	The whole act.
54 Geo. 3. c. 178	Yeomanry Corps, etc. (Ireland) Act 1814	An Act to continue so much of an Act made in the Forty-third Year of His present Majesty's Reign, for authorizing the billetting and subjecting to Military Discipline certain Yeomanry Corps and Officers of Cavalry or Infantry, as relates to such Corps in Ireland.	The whole act.
54 Geo. 3. c. 179	Militia (Ireland) Act 1814	An Act to amend an Act passed in the Forty-ninth Year of His present Majesty's Reign, intituled An Act for amending and reducing into One Act of Parliament the several Laws for raising and training the Militia of Ireland.	Section One.
54 Geo. 3. c. 180	Unlawful Combinations (Ireland) Act 1814	An Act to provide for the preserving and restoring of Peace in such Parts of Ireland as may at any Time be disturbed by seditious Persons, or by Persons entering into unlawful Combinations or Conspiracies.	The whole act.
54 Geo. 3. c. 182	Trade of Malta, etc. Act 1814	An Act the title of which begins with the words,—An Act to continue, until the Twenty-fifth Day of March,—and ends with the words,—landing certain Prize Goods in Great Britain.	The whole act.
54 Geo. 3. c. 184	Accounts of Colonial Revenues Act 1814	An Act for the effectual Examination of Accounts of the Receipt and Expenditure of the Colonial Revenues in the Islands of Ceylon, Mauritius, Malta, Trinidad, and in the Settlements of the Cape of Good Hope, for Five Years.	The whole act.
54 Geo. 3. c. 186	Apprehension of Offenders Act 1814	An Act for the more easy apprehending and trying of Offenders escaping from one Part of the United Kingdom to the other.	The whole act.
54 Geo. 3. c. 188	Exchequer Bills (No. 4) Act 1814	An Act for enabling His Majesty to raise the Sum of Three Millions for the Service of Great Britain, and for applying the Sum of Two hundred thousand Pounds British Currency for the Service of Ireland.	The whole act.
54 Geo. 3. c. 189	Militia Pay (Great Britain) Act 1814	An Act the title of which begins with the words,—An Act to defray the Charge of the Pay,—and ends with the words,—Militia, until the Twenty-fifth Day of June One thousand eight hundred and fifteen.	The whole act.
54 Geo. 3. c. 190	Land Tax Act 1814	An Act the title of which begins with the words,—An Act for appointing Commissioners for carrying into Execution an Act of this Session,—and ends with the words,—Service of the Year One thousand seven hundred and ninety-eight.	The whole act.
55 Geo. 3. c. 3	Duties on Malt, etc. Act 1814	An Act for continuing to His Majesty certain Duties on Malt, Sugar, Tobacco and Snuff in Great Britain; and on Pensions, Offices, and Personal Estates in England; for the Service of the Year One thousand eight hundred and fifteen.	The whole act.
55 Geo. 3. c. 4	Exchequer Bills (No. 5) Act 1814	An Act for raising the Sum of Ten millions five hundred thousand Pounds, by Exchequer Bills, for the Service of Great Britain for the Year One thousand eight hundred and fifteen.	The whole act.
55 Geo. 3. c. 5	Exchequer Bills (No. 6) Act 1814	An Act to enable the Commissioners of His Majesty's Treasury to issue Exchequer Bills, on the Credit of such Aids or Supplies as have been or shall be granted by Parliament for the Service of Great Britain for the Year One thousand eight hundred and fifteen.	The whole act.
55 Geo. 3. c. 6	Negotiation of Notes and Bills Act 1814	An Act the title of which begins with the words,—An Act to continue, until the Twenty-fifth Day of March,—and ends with the words,—Negotiation of Promissory Notes and Bills of Exchange under a limited Sum in England.	The whole act.
55 Geo. 3. c. 7	Duties on Glass, etc. (Ireland) Act 1814	An Act to repeal an Act of the last Session of Parliament, for granting Duties of Excise on certain Sorts of Glass made in Ireland, and for granting and allowing certain Countervailing Duties and Drawbacks in respect thereof.	The whole act.
55 Geo. 3. c. 8	Importation, etc. (No. 2) Act 1814	An Act the title of which begins with the words,—An Act to continue during the Continuance of the present War,—and ends with the words,—States in Amity with His Majesty, of certain Goods, Wares, and Merchandise.	The whole act.
55 Geo. 3. c. 9	Importation, etc. (No. 3) Act 1814	An Act the title of which begins with the words,—An Act to continue, until the Expiration of Six Months after the Conclusion of the present Hostilities,—and ends with the words,—His Majesty's Territories in the West Indies and Continent of South America.	The whole act.
55 Geo. 3. c. 11	Privileges of Foreign Ships, etc. Act 1814	An Act the title of which begins with the words,—An Act to continue, until Six Months after the Ratification of a Definitive Treaty of Peace,—and ends with the words,—Merchants or Factors during the present War.	The whole act.
55 Geo. 3. c. 15	Account of Civil List Revenues Act 1815	An Act to amend an Act made in the Fifty-second Year of His present Majesty, for making Provision for the better Support of His Majesty's Household, during the Continuance of His Majesty's Indisposition.	The whole act.
55 Geo. 3. c. 18	Annuity to Lord Walsingham Act 1815	An Act to settle and secure an Annuity on Lord Walsingham, in consideration of his Services as Chairman of the Committees of the House of Lords.	The whole act.
55 Geo. 3. c. 19	Intoxicating Liquors (Ireland) Act 1815	An Act the title of which begins with the words,—An Act to grant certain Duties of Excise upon Licences,—and ends with the words,—immoderate Use of Spirituous Liquors in Ireland.	Except Section One to "other Act or Acts;" and from "and that" to end of that Section, Sections Nine, Nineteen, Sixty-four, Sixty-five, Section Sixty-seven from "and in" to end of that Section, Sections Sixty-eight, Seventy-six to Eighty-three, One hundred and one, the paragraphs of the Schedule which begin with the words "Any Licence to any Person to exercise the Trade or Calling of" and "And further for every" and the sums of money opposite those paragraphs in the outer column.
55 Geo. 3. c. 20	Mutiny Act 1815	An Act for punishing Mutiny and Desertion; and for the better Payment of the Army and their Quarters.	The whole act.
55 Geo. 3. c. 21	Marine Mutiny Act 1815	An Act for the regulating of His Majesty's Royal Marine Forces while on Shore.	The whole act.
55 Geo. 3. c. 27	Excise Act 1815	An Act to continue until the Fifth Day of July One thousand eight hundred and sixteen, certain Additional Duties of Excise in Great Britain.	The whole act.
55 Geo. 3. c. 28	Restriction on Cash Payments Act 1815	An Act to continue, until the Fifth Day of July One thousand eight hundred and sixteen, an Act of the Forty-fourth Year of His present Majesty, to continue the Restrictions contained in the several Acts of His present Majesty on Payments of Cash by the Bank of England.	The whole act.
55 Geo. 3. c. 30	Excise (No. 2) Act 1815	An Act for granting to His Majesty, until the Fifth Day of April One thousand eight hundred and nineteen, certain additional Duties of Excise in Great Britain on Sweets, Tobacco, Snuff, and Excise Licences.	The whole act.
55 Geo. 3. c. 32	Customs Act (No. 3) 1815	An Act the title of which begins with the words,—An Act to rectify a Mistake in an Act of the present Session,—and ends with the words,—certain Countervailing Duties, Drawbacks, and Bounties, on Refined Sugar.	The whole act.
55 Geo. 3. c. 33	Customs Act (No. 4) 1815	An Act to continue, until the Fifth Day of July One thousand eight hundred and sixteen, certain Temporary or War Duties of Customs on the Importation into Great Britain of Goods, Wares, and Merchandise.	The whole act.
55 Geo. 3. c. 34	Importation Act (No. 2) 1815	An Act to continue until the Twenty-fifth Day of March One thousand eight hundred and seventeen, an Act made in the Forty-ninth Year of His present Majesty, to permit the Importation of Tobacco into Great Britain from any Place whatever.	The whole act.
55 Geo. 3. c. 38	Bleaching Powder Act 1815	An Act to repeal so much of an Act of the last Session of Parliament as directs that Scots and Irish Paupers removed from Ireland and Scotland, should be removed into England.	The whole act.
55 Geo. 3. c. 39	Greenland Whale Fisheries Act 1815	An Act the title of which begins with the words,—An Act to revive and continue, until the Twenty-fifth Day of March,—and ends with the words,—Vessels employed in the said Fisheries to complete their full Number of Men at certain Ports.	The whole act.
55 Geo. 3. c. 40	Treasury Bills (Ireland) Act 1815	An Act for raising the Sum of Two Millions three hundred and twenty-three thousand nine hundred and fifty Pounds Irish Currency, by Treasury Bills, for the Service of Ireland, for the Year One thousand eight hundred and fifteen.	The whole act.
55 Geo. 3. c. 41	Restriction on Cash Payments (No. 2) Act 1815	An Act to continue, until Three Months after the ceasing of any Restriction imposed on the Bank of England from issuing Cash in Payment, the several Acts for confirming and continuing the Restrictions on Payments in Cash by the Bank of Ireland.	The whole act.
55 Geo. 3. c. 42	Jury Trials (Scotland) Act 1815	An Act to facilitate the Administration of Justice in that Part of the United Kingdom called Scotland, by the extending Trial by Jury to Civil Causes.	Sections Two to Four, Ten and Eleven. Section Twelve from "out of which" to "appoint;" and the words "the Remainder of". Sections Thirteen, Fourteen, and Eighteen. Section Twenty-one to "said Issue;". Sections Thirty-four, Thirty-six to Thirty-eight, and Forty-two to Forty-five.
55 Geo. 3. c. 44	Prize Vessels, etc. (Ireland) Act 1815	An Act for the Relief of the Captors of Prizes, with respect to the admitting and landing of certain Prize Vessels and Goods in Ireland; to continue in force until the Twenty-fifth Day of March One thousand eight hundred and sixteen.	The whole act.
55 Geo. 3. c. 47	Poor (England) Act 1815	An Act for procuring Returns relative to the Expence and Maintenance of the Poor in England; and also relative to the Highways.	The whole act.
55 Geo. 3. c. 48	Chaplains in Gaols, etc. (England) Act 1815	An Act to repeal certain Powers of Two Acts of His present Majesty, for providing Clergymen to officiate in Gaols and Houses of Correction within England and Wales.	The whole act.
55 Geo. 3. c. 50	Gaol Fees Abolition Act 1815	An Act for the Abolition of Gaol and other Fees connected with the Gaols in England.	Sections Two and Three. Section Five to "Act,". Sections Ten, Fourteen, and Fifteen.
55 Geo. 3. c. 51	County Rates Act 1815	An Act to amend an Act of His late Majesty King George the Second, for the more easy assessing, collecting, and levying of County Rates.	Section Seventeen from "so much" to "and that".
55 Geo. 3. c. 52	Customs Act (No. 6) 1815	An Act to revive and continue, until the Twenty-fifth Day of March One thousand eight hundred and twenty, several Acts for charging additional Duties on Copper imported into Great Britain.	The whole act.
55 Geo. 3. c. 53	Duties on Property, etc. (Great Britain) Act 1815	An Act to revive and continue for One Year the Duties and Contributions on the Profits arising from Property, Professions, Trades, and Offices in Great Britain.	The whole act.
55 Geo. 3. c. 54	Aliens Act 1815	An Act to repeal an Act of the last Session of Parliament, for establishing Regulations respecting Aliens arriving in this Kingdom, or resident therein; and to establish, for Twelve Months, other Regulations respecting Aliens arriving in this Kingdom, or residing therein, in certain Cases.	The whole act.
55 Geo. 3. c. 63	Excise (No. 5) Act 1815	An Act to repeal the additional Duty on British-made Low Wines or Spirits granted by an Act of this Session of Parliament.	The whole act.
55 Geo. 3. c. 64	East India Company Act 1815	An Act to explain an Act of the Fifty-third Year of His present Majesty, so far as relates to the granting Gratuities by the East India Company	Repealed as to all Her Majesty's Dominions.
55 Geo. 3. c. 65	Militia (Medical Examination) Act 1815	An Act to amend the Laws relating to the Militia of Great Britain.	Sections One to Four. Section Seven to "Service; and". Section Nine, so far as regards the authority to grant commissions.
55 Geo. 3. c. 70	Court of Session (Records) Act 1815	An Act for better regulating the Formation and Arrangement of the Judicial and other Records of the Court of Session in Scotland.	Section One from "to be appointed" to end of that Section. Section Two from "Provided" to end of that Section. Sections Five to Seven.
55 Geo. 3. c. 71	Hawkers (Scotland) Act 1815	An Act to regulate Hawkers and Pedlars in Scotland.	Sections One to Three, Five, Six, Ten, Thirteen, and Fourteen. Section Sixteen from "in any Mart" to end of that Section. Section Seventeen to end of Act.
55 Geo. 3. c. 73	Lotteries Act 1815	An Act for granting to His Majesty a Sum of Money to be raised by Lotteries.	The whole act.
55 Geo. 3. c. 75	Discovery of Longitude at Sea Act 1815	An Act the title of which begins with the words,—An Act to continue the Encouragement of Persons making Discoveries for finding the Longitude at Sea,—and ends with the words,—carrying the Acts relating thereto into Execution.	The whole act.
55 Geo. 3. c. 76	Local Militia (Great Britain) Act 1815	An Act to enable His Majesty, until the First Day of May One thousand eight hundred and sixteen, to accept the Services of the Local Militia either in or out of their Counties, under certain Restrictions.	The whole act.
55 Geo. 3. c. 77	Militia Act 1815	An Act to authorize, under present Circumstances, the Drawing out and Embodying of the British and Irish Militia, or any Part thereof.	The whole act.
55 Geo. 3. c. 84	Indian Presidency Towns Act 1815	An Act the title of which begins with the words,—An Act to amend so much of an Act of the Thirty-third Year,—and ends with the words,—Provision for the Judges in the East Indies in certain cases	Except Section One. Repealed as to all Her Majesty's Dominions.
55 Geo. 3. c. 85	Enlistment of Foreigners Act 1815	An Act the title of which begins with the words,—An Act to amend and continue, for One Year,—and ends with the words,—Commission to the Subjects of Foreign States to serve as Officers, under certain Restrictions.	The whole act.
55 Geo. 3. c. 86	Importation Act (No. 3) 1815	An Act to continue, until the Twenty-fifth Day of March One thousand eight hundred and twenty, an Act made in the Forty-sixth Year of His present Majesty, for permitting the Importation of Masts, Yards, Bowsprits, and Timber for Naval Purposes, from the British Colonies in North America.	The whole act.
55 Geo. 3. c. 89	Court Houses (Ireland) Act 1815	An Act to amend an Act of the Fifty-third Year of His Majesty's Reign, for making Regulations for the building and repairing of Court Houses and Sessions Houses in Ireland	Sections Three and Four, except as to the county of the city of Dublin. Section Five.
55 Geo. 3. c. 90	Limitation of Time (Ireland) (Canal Companies) Act 1815	An Act to explain an Act made in the Parliament of Ireland, in the Thirty-second Year of His Majesty's Reign, relative to Inland Navigations there, so far as relates to the Limitation of Actions against Canal Companies and others	Except to "accrued and not afterwards;".
55 Geo. 3. c. 91	Criminal Costs (Dublin) Act 1815	An Act for the Payment of Costs and Charges to Prosecutors and Witnesses in Cases of Felony in Ireland.	The whole act.
55 Geo. 3. c. 93	Duty on Silk Handkerchiefs Act 1815	An Act to repeal the Duties payable on, and the Permission to enter for Home Consumption, Silk Handkerchiefs Imported by the East India Company.	The whole act.
55 Geo. 3. c. 97	Commissary Court of Edinburgh Act 1815	An Act to grant to the Judges of the Commissary Court of Edinburgh a fixed Salary in place of their present Salary and certain Fees and Payments.	The whole act.
55 Geo. 3. c. 98	Stamp Duties (Ireland) Act 1815	An Act to enable the Select Committee on the Downpatrick Election to reassemble, and to suspend the Transmission of the Warrants and other Proceedings for the Appointment of Commissioners to examine Witnesses in Ireland.	The whole act.
55 Geo. 3. c. 102	Duties on Leather Act 1815	An Act to repeal certain Duties on Leather dressed in Oil in Great Britain, or imported from Ireland.	The whole act.
55 Geo. 3. c. 104	Spirits (Ireland) (No. 2) Act 1815	An Act to make further Provisions for the issuing of Licences to Persons to deal in, retail, make, or manufacture Spirits and other Exciseable Commodities in Ireland, and for securing the Duties of Excise payable by the Persons so licensed.	Except Section Fifteen.
55 Geo. 3. c. 108	Mutiny (No. 2) Act 1815	An Act for punishing Mutiny and Desertion; and for the better Payment of the Army and their Quarters.	The whole act.
55 Geo. 3. c. 113	Duties, etc., on Glass, etc. Act 1815	An Act the title of which begins with the words,—An Act for altering certain Drawbacks and Countervailing Duties on Glass,—and ends with the words,—imported from Ireland for Private Use from Duty.	The whole act.
55 Geo. 3. c. 115	Russian Dutch Loan Act 1815	An Act to carry into effect a Convention made between His Majesty and the King of the Netherlands and the Emperor of all the Russias.	The last Section.
55 Geo. 3. c. 117	Importation and Exportation Act 1815	An Act the title of which begins with the words,—An Act to permit, until Six Weeks,—and ends with the words,—Importation, in Neutral Vessels from States not in Amity with His Majesty, of certain Goods, Wares, and Merchandise.	The whole act.
55 Geo. 3. c. 126	Allowances to Foreign Officers Act 1815	An Act to authorize the allowing to Foreign Officers, Allowances equivalent in Amount to the Half Pay given to British Officers under like Circumstances.	The whole act.
55 Geo. 3. c. 127	Embezzlement of Public Stores Act 1815	An Act to repeal an Act of the Fifty-third Year of His present Majesty, for preventing the Embezzlement of Stores; and to extend the Provisions of the several Acts relating to His Majesty's Naval, Ordnance, and Victualling Stores, to all other Public Stores.	Section One.
55 Geo. 3. c. 130	Payment of Forces Abroad Act 1815	An Act for further regulating the Issue and Payment of Money to His Majesty's Forces serving Abroad.	The whole act.
55 Geo. 3. c. 131	Half Pay of Officers, etc. Act 1815	An Act for discontinuing certain Deductions from Half Pay, and for further regulating the Accounts of the Paymaster General.	The whole act.
55 Geo. 3. c. 132	Trade in Spirits Act 1815	An Act to continue, until the End of the next Session of Parliament, an Act of the last Session of Parliament, for regulating the Trade in Spirits between Great Britain and Ireland reciprocally.	The whole act.
55 Geo. 3. c. 139	Duty on Spirits (Ireland) Act 1815	An Act to grant an additional Duty of Excise in Ireland, upon Spirits made or distilled from Corn or Grain.	The whole act.
55 Geo. 3. c. 146	Trade with French Colonies Act 1815	An Act to authorize His Majesty to regulate, until the First Day of July One thousand eight hundred and sixteen, the Trade with any French Colony which may come into His Majesty's Possession or remain Neutral.	The whole act.
55 Geo. 3. c. 147	Glebe Exchange Act 1815	An Act the title of which begins with the words,—An Act for enabling Spiritual Persons to exchange the Parsonage or Glebe Houses or Glebe Lands,—and ends with the words,—Leases to become Glebe in certain Cases, and for other Purposes.	Section One from "Provided" to "Chancery". Sections Seven to Nine. Section Ten, so far as it relates to any mortgage.
55 Geo. 3. c. 148	Exchequer Bills Act 1815	An Act for raising the Sum of Four millions five hundred thousand Pounds, by Exchequer Bills, for the Service of Great Britain, for the Year One thousand eight hundred and fifteen.	The whole act.
55 Geo. 3. c. 149	Exchequer Bills (No. 2) Act 1815	An Act for raising the Sum of One million five hundred thousand Pounds, by Exchequer Bills, for the Service of Great Britain, for the Year One thousand eight hundred and fifteen.	The whole act.
55 Geo. 3. c. 150	Land, Tax, etc. Act 1815	An Act for rectifying Mistakes in the Names of the Land Tax Commissioners, and for appointing additional Commissioners, and indemnifying such Persons as have acted without due Authority in Execution of the Acts therein recited.	The whole act.
55 Geo. 3. c. 154	Quartering of Soldiers Act 1815	An Act for fixing the Rates of Subsistence to be paid to Innkeepers and others on quartering Soldiers.	The whole act.
55 Geo. 3. c. 155	Duties on Spirits, etc. (Scotland) Act 1815	An Act the title of which begins with the words,—An Act to continue, until the Fifth Day of July,—and ends with the words,—reduce the Duties thereby imposed.	The whole act.
55 Geo. 3. c. 156	Transportation Act 1815	An Act to amend the Laws relative to the Transportation of Offenders; to continue in force until the First Day of May One thousand eight hundred and sixteen.	The whole act.
55 Geo. 3. c. 158	Conveyance of Prisoners (Ireland) Act 1815	An Act to enable Grand Juries to present additional Sums for Constables in Ireland, and for the secure Conveyance of Prisoners.	The whole act.
55 Geo. 3. c. 161	Taxes (Scotland) Act 1815	An Act the title of which begins with the words,—An Act to amend and render more effectual an Act of the Fifty-second Year,—and ends with the words,—Trades, and Offices, in that Part of Great Britain called Scotland.	Sections One to Three.
55 Geo. 3. c. 162	Duties on Epsom Salts Act 1815	An Act to repeal the Excise Duties and Drawbacks on Epsom Salt.	The whole act.
55 Geo. 3. c. 164	Duty on Foreign Spirits Act 1815	An Act to exonerate, in certain Cases, Foreign Spirits imported during the Suspension of the Spirit Intercourse between Great Britain and Ireland from the additional Duty imposed thereon.	The whole act.
55 Geo. 3. c. 165	Militia Pay (Great Britain) Act 1815	An Act the title of which begins with the words,—An Act to defray the Charge of the Pay,—and ends with the words,—Militia, until the Twenty-fifth Day of March One thousand eight hundred and sixteen.	The whole act.
55 Geo. 3. c. 166	Local Militia Pay (Great Britain) Act 1815	An Act for defraying the Charge of the Pay and Clothing of the Local Militia in Great Britain, to the Twenty-fifth Day of March One thousand eight hundred and sixteen.	The whole act.
55 Geo. 3. c. 167	Militia Pay (Ireland) Act 1815	An Act for defraying, until the Twenty-fifth Day of June One thousand eight hundred and sixteen, the Charge of the Pay and Clothing of the Militia of Ireland; and for making Allowances in certain Cases to Subaltern Officers of the said Militia during Peace.	The whole act.
55 Geo. 3. c. 171	Inciting to Mutiny, etc. Act 1815	An Act to continue for One Year certain Acts for the better Prevention and Punishment of Attempts to seduce Persons serving in His Majesty's Forces by Sea or Land from their Duty and Allegiance to His Majesty, or to incite them to Mutiny or Disobedience.	The whole act.
55 Geo. 3. c. 173	Protection of Trade Act 1815	An Act for the better Protection of the Trade of the United Kingdom during the present Hostilities with France.	The whole act.
55 Geo. 3. c. 175	Bringing of Coal to London, etc. Act 1815	An Act to continue, until the First Day of July One thousand eight hundred and sixteen, Two Acts of the Fiftieth and Forty-fifth Years of His present Majesty, allowing the bringing of Coals, Culm, and Cinders to London and Westminster, by Inland Navigation.	The whole act.
55 Geo. 3. c. 178	Flax, etc., Manufacture (Great Britain) Act 1815	An Act to revive and continue, until the Twenty-fifth Day of March One thousand eight hundred and twenty, an Act of the Twenty-eighth Year of His present Majesty, for the more effectual Encouragement of the Manufacture of Flax and Cotton in Great Britain.	The whole act.
55 Geo. 3. c. 180	Exportation Act 1815	An Act to revive and continue, until the Fifth Day of July One thousand eight hundred and sixteen, an Act of the Forty-sixth Year of His present Majesty's Reign, for granting an additional Bounty on the Exportation of the Silk Manufactures of Great Britain.	The whole act.
55 Geo. 3. c. 182	Inland Navigation (Ireland) Act 1815	An Act to authorise the Directors General of Inland Navigation in Ireland to proceed in carrying on and completing the Canal from Dublin to Tarmonbury on the River Shannon.	The whole act.
55 Geo. 3. c. 183	Exportation (No. 2) Act 1815	An Act to repeal the Bounties payable in Ireland on the Exportation of certain Calicoes and Cottons.	The whole act.
55 Geo. 3. c. 184	Stamp Act 1815	An Act the title of which begins with the words,—An Act for repealing the Stamp Duties on Deeds,—and ends with the words,—other Duties in lieu thereof -	Sections Twenty-five and Twenty-six. Section Fifty-two, the words "Ordinary or ".
55 Geo. 3. c. 185	Plate Duties Act 1815	An Act for repealing the Stamp Office Duties on Advertisements, Almanacks, Newspapers, Gold and Silver Plate, Stage Coaches, and Licences for keeping Stage Coaches, now payable in Great Britain; and for granting new Duties in lieu thereof.	Except Sections Two, Four, and the Schedule so far as such Sections and Schedule relate to the duties on plate, and except Section Seven.
55 Geo. 3. c. 187	Appropriation Act 1815	An Act the title of which begins with the words,—An Act for granting to His Majesty certain Sums out of the respective Consolidated Funds,—and ends with the words,—appropriating the Supplies granted in this Session of Parliament.	The whole act.
55 Geo. 3. c. 189	Allowance of Duty to Meux and Company Act 1815	An Act the title of which begins with the words,—An Act for allowing Henry Meux,—and ends with the words,—Duties on the Malt and Hops expended in the Production of the Beer so lost.	The whole act.
55 Geo. 3. c. 193	Trade with United States Act 1815	An Act to enable His Majesty, until Six Weeks after the Commencement of the next Session of Parliament, to regulate the Trade and Commerce carried on between His Majesty's Subjects and the Inhabitants of the United States of America.	The whole act.
55 Geo. 3. c. 196	Exchequer Bills (Great Britain) Act 1815	An Act for enabling His Majesty to raise the Sum of Six Millions for the Service of Great Britain.	The whole act.
56 Geo. 3. c. 1	Exchequer Bills (Great Britain) Act 1815	An Act to revive and continue, until the Twenty-fifth Day of March One thousand eight hundred and sixteen, several Laws relating to the Duties on Glass made in Great Britain.	The whole act.
56 Geo. 3. c. 2	Importation Act 1816	An Act to revive and continue, until the Twenty-fifth Day of March One thousand eight hundred and seventeen, an Act of the Seventh Year of King George the Second, for the free Importation of Cochineal and Indigo.	The whole act.
56 Geo. 3. c. 3	Duties on Malt, etc. Act 1816	An Act for continuing to His Majesty certain Duties on Malt, Sugar, Tobacco, and Snuff, in Great Britain; and on Pensions, Offices, and Personal Estates, in England; for the Service of the Year One thousand eight hundred and sixteen.	The whole act.
56 Geo. 3. c. 4	Exchequer Bills Act 1816	An Act for raising the Sum of Eleven Millions, by Exchequer Bills, for the Service of Great Britain for the Year One thousand eight hundred and sixteen.	The whole act.
56 Geo. 3. c. 6	Residence on Benefices, etc. (England) Act 1816	An Act to continue, until the Fifth Day of July One thousand eight hundred and sixteen, an Act of the Forty-fourth Year of His present Majesty, for explaining and amending several Acts relating to Spiritual Persons holding of Farms, and for enforcing the Residence of such Persons on their Benefices, in England.	The whole act.
56 Geo. 3. c. 8	Cape of Good Hope Trade Act 1816	An Act to continue, until the Fifth Day of July One thousand eight hundred and seventeen, an Act of the Fifty-fourth Year of His present Majesty, for regulating the Trade and Commerce to and from the Cape of Good Hope.	The whole act.
56 Geo. 3. c. 10	Mutiny Act 1816	An Act for punishing Mutiny and Desertion; and for the better Payment of the Army and their Quarters.	The whole act.
56 Geo. 3. c. 11	Marine Mutiny Act 1816	An Act for the regulating of His Majesty's Royal Marine Forces while on Shore.	The whole act.
56 Geo. 3. c. 12	Naturalization of Prince Leopald	An Act for exhibiting a Bill in this present Parliament, for naturalizing His Serene Highness Leopold George Frederick Duke of Saxe, Margrave of Meissen, Landgrave of Thuringuen, Prince of Cobourg of Saalfeld.	The whole act.
56 Geo. 3. c. 13	Naturalization of Prince Leopald (No. 2) Act 1816	An Act for the Naturalization of His Serene Highness Leopold George Frederick Duke of Saxe, Margrave of Meissen, Landgrave of Thuringuen, Prince of Cobourg of Saalfeld; and settling his Precedence.	The whole act.
56 Geo. 3. c. 14	Advance by Bank of England (No. 2) Act 1816	An Act for empowering the Governor and Company of the Bank of England to advance the Sum of Six Millions, towards the Supply for the Service of the Year One thousand eight hundred and sixteen.	The whole act.
56 Geo. 3. c. 16	Receiver of Crown Rents Act 1816	An Act for better regulating the Offices of Receivers of Crown Rents.	The whole act.
56 Geo. 3. c. 17	Excise Act 1816	An Act to continue, until the Fifth Day of July One thousand eight hundred and twenty-one, certain additional Duties of Excise in Great Britain.	The whole act.
56 Geo. 3. c. 18	Duty on Lead (Great Britain) Act 1816	An Act to suspend, until the Fifth Day of April One thousand eight hundred and twenty, the Duty on Lead exported from Great Britain.	The whole act.
56 Geo. 3. c. 19	Bounty on Sugar Act 1816	An Act to continue, until the Fifth Day of July One thousand eight hundred and sixteen, an Act of the Forty-seventh Year of His present Majesty, for granting an additional Bounty on double refined Sugar exported.	The whole act.
56 Geo. 3. c. 20	Customs and Excise (Ireland) Act 1816	An Act to make further Provision for the Execution of the several Acts relating to the Revenues, Matters and Things, under the Management of the Commissioners of Customs and Port Duties, and of the Commissioners of Inland Excise and Taxes, in Ireland.	The whole act.
56 Geo. 3. c. 21	Negotiation of Notes and Bills Act 1816	An Act the title of which begins with the words,—An Act to revive and continue, until Two Years,—and ends with the words,—Negociation of Promissory Notes and Bills of Exchange under a limited Sum, in England.	The whole act.
56 Geo. 3. c. 22	Custody of Napoleon Buonaparte Act 1816	An Act for the more effectually detaining in Custody Napoleon Buonaparté.	The whole act.
56 Geo. 3. c. 23	Intercourse with Saint Helena Act 1816	An Act for regulating the Intercourse with the Island of Saint Helena, during the time Napoleon Buonaparté shall be detained there; and for indemnifying Persons in the Cases therein mentioned.	The whole act.
56 Geo. 3. c. 24	Provision for Princess Charlotte, etc. Act 1816	An Act for better enabling His Majesty to make Provision for the Establishment of Her Royal Highness the Princess Charlotte Augusta, and His Serene Highness Leopold George Frederick Duke of Saxe, Margrave of Meissen, Landgrave of Thuringuen, Prince of Cobourg of Saalfeld.	The whole act.
56 Geo. 3. c. 27	Transportation Act 1816	An Act to amend several Laws relative to the Transportation of Offenders; to continue in force until the First Day of May One thousand eight hundred and twenty-one.	The whole act.
56 Geo. 3. c. 28	Exchequer Bills (No. 2) Act 1816	An Act to enable the Commissioners of His Majesty's Treasury to issue Exchequer Bills, on the Credit of such Aids or Supplies as have been or shall be granted by Parliament for the Service of Great Britain, for the Year One thousand eight hundred and sixteen.	The whole act.
56 Geo. 3. c. 30	Excise, etc. Act 1816	An Act for indemnifying the Commissioners of Excise in Scotland, and all Persons who may have acted under their Authority, in relation to certain Orders issued and Things done relative to certain Acts regarding the Distilleries in Scotland.	The whole act.
56 Geo. 3. c. 31	Transfer of Contracts, etc. Act 1816	An Act for transferring all Contracts and Securities entered into with or given to the Commissioners for Transports, to the Commissioners of the Navy and Victualling.	The whole act.
56 Geo. 3. c. 32	Quartering of Soldiers Act 1816	An Act for fixing the Rates of Subsistence to be paid to Innkeepers and others on quartering Soldiers.	The whole act.
56 Geo. 3. c. 36	Importation (No. 4) Act 1816	An Act to repeal Two Acts passed in the Reigns of King Edward the Fourth and King Richard the Third, which prohibit the Importation of Wrought Goods and certain other Articles.	The whole act.
56 Geo. 3. c. 38	Local Militia Ballot Suspension Act 1816	An Act to empower His Majesty to suspend the Ballot or Enrolment for the Local Militia.	The whole act.
56 Geo. 3. c. 40	Restriction on Cash Payments Act 1816	An Act for continuing, until the Fifth Day of July One thousand eight hundred and eighteen, an Act of the Forty-fourth Year of His present Majesty, to continue the Restrictions contained in the several Acts of His present Majesty, on Payments of Cash by the Bank of England.	The whole act.
56 Geo. 3. c. 41	Treasury Bills (Ireland) Act 1816	An Act for raising the Sum of Two millions five hundred and seventy thousand Pounds Irish Currency, by Treasury Bills, for the Service of Ireland, for the Year One thousand eight hundred and sixteen.	The whole act.
56 Geo. 3. c. 42	Treasury Bills (Ireland) (No. 2) Act 1816	An Act for raising the Sum of One million seven hundred thousand Pounds British Currency, by Treasury Bills, for the Service of Ireland, for the Year One thousand eight hundred and sixteen.	The whole act.
56 Geo. 3. c. 43	Duties on Malt, etc. (No. 2) Act 1816	An Act for making certain Allowances of the Duties payable on Malt and Beer.	The whole act.
56 Geo. 3. c. 45	Local Militia Pay (Great Britain) Act 1816	An Act for defraying the Charge of the Pay and Cloathing of the Local Militia in Great Britain, to the Twenty-fifth Day of March One thousand eight hundred and seventeen.	The whole act.
56 Geo. 3. c. 46	Civil List Audit Act 1816	An Act for the better Regulation of the Civil List:—	Except Sections Eight to Twelve.
56 Geo. 3. c. 47	Treasury Bills (Ireland) (No. 3) Act 1816	An Act for raising the Sum of One million two hundred thousand Pounds Irish Currency, by Treasury Bills, for the Service of Ireland, for the Year One thousand eight hundred and sixteen.	The whole act.
56 Geo. 3. c. 48	Restriction on Cash Payments (No. 2) Act 1816	An Act to continue, until Three Months after the ceasing of any Restriction imposed on the Bank of England from issuing Cash in Payment, the several Acts for confirming and continuing the Restrictions on Payments in Cash by the Bank of Ireland.	The whole act.
56 Geo. 3. c. 50	Sale of Farming Stock Act 1816	An Act to regulate the Sale of Farming Stock taken in Execution.	Section Eleven, so far as it relates to an assignee of any insolvent debtor's estate.
56 Geo. 3. c. 52	Glebe Exchange Act 1816	An Act to amend and render more effectual an Act passed in the last Session of Parliament, for enabling Spiritual Persons to exchange their Parsonage Houses or Glebe Lands, and for other Purposes therein mentioned -	Section Two.
56 Geo. 3. c. 53	National Debt Commissioners Act 1816	An Act to amend and render more effectual Three several Acts passed in the Forty-eighth, Forty-ninth, and Fifty-second Years of His present Majesty, for enabling the Commissioners for the Reduction of the National Debt to grant Life Annuities.	The whole act.
56 Geo. 3. c. 54	Exchequer Bills (No. 3) Act 1816	An Act for raising the Sum of Thirteen Millions by Exchequer Bills, for the Service of Great Britain, for the Year One thousand eight hundred and sixteen.	The whole act.
56 Geo. 3. c. 55	Canals (Ireland) Act 1816	An Act the title of which begins with the words,—An Act to amend an Act of the Parliament of Ireland, in the Fortieth Year,—and ends with the words,— Powers vested in the Directors of all Works relating to Inland Navigation in Ireland	Sections Ten to Thirteen and Twenty-two.
56 Geo. 3. c. 58	Beer Act 1816	An Act to repeal an Act made in the Fifty-first Year of His present Majesty, for allowing the Manufacture and Use of a Liquor prepared from Sugar for colouring Porter -	Section One. Section Four from " and that " to end of that Section. Section Five.
56 Geo. 3. c. 61	Lotteries Act 1816	An Act for granting to His Majesty a Sum of Money to be raised by Lotteries.	The whole act.
56 Geo. 3. c. 64	Militia Act 1816	An Act to repeal several Acts relating to the Militia of Great Britain, and to amend other Acts relating thereto	Sections One to Three and Five.
56 Geo. 3. c. 65	Duties on Property, etc. Act 1816	An Act the title of which begins with the words,—An Act to explain and amend an Act for granting Duties on the Profits arising from Property,—and ends with the words,—exempting Collectors' Bonds from the Stamp Duties.	The whole act.
56 Geo. 3. c. 67	Exercise of Trades by Soldiers, etc. Act 1816	An Act to enable such Officers, Marines, and Soldiers, as have been in the Land or Sea Service, or in the Marines, or in the Militia, or any Corps of Fencible Men, since the Forty-second Year of his present Majesty's Reign, to exercise Trades.	The whole act.
56 Geo. 3. c. 69	Duties on Madder Act 1816	An Act to continue, until the Twenty-fifth Day of March One thousand eight hundred and eighteen, Two Acts of the Fifty-fourth Year of His present Majesty, for repealing the Duties of Customs on Madder imported into Great Britain, and for granting other Duties in lieu thereof.	The whole act.
56 Geo. 3. c. 71	Arrears of Crown, etc. Rents (Ireland) Act 1816	An Act to amend an Act of the Fifty-first Year of His present Majesty's Reign, for discharging certain Arrears of Quit, Crown, and Composition Rents in Ireland.	The whole act.
56 Geo. 3. c. 72	Yeomanry Corps (Ireland) Act 1816	An Act to continue and amend so much of an Act of the Forty-third Year of His present Majesty's Reign, for authorizing the billeting and subjecting to Military Discipline certain Yeomanry Corps, and Officers of Cavalry or Infantry, as relates to such Corps in Ireland.	The whole act.
56 Geo. 3. c. 76	Exportation Act 1816	An Act for repealing the several Bounties on the Exportation of Refined Sugar, from any Part of the United Kingdom, and for allowing other Bounties in lieu thereof, until the Fifth Day of July One thousand eight hundred and eighteen.	The whole act.
56 Geo. 3. c. 87	Grand Jury (Ireland) Act 1816	An Act to regulate Proceedings of Grand Juries in Ireland, upon Bills of Indictment	Section One, the words " in Court ".
56 Geo. 3. c. 90	Militia Pay (Great Britain) Act 1816	An Act the title of which begins with the words,—An Act to defray the Charge of the Pay,—and ends with the words,—Militia, until the Twenty-fifth Day of March One thousand eight hundred and seventeen.	The whole act.
56 Geo. 3. c. 92	Exportation (No. 2) Act 1816	An Act to enable His Majesty to authorize the Exportation of the Machinery necessary for erecting a Mint in the United States of America.	The whole act.
56 Geo. 3. c. 95	Transfer of Stock of Hertford College Act 1816	An Act to authorize such Person as His Majesty shall appoint to transfer a certain Sum in Three Pounds per Cent. Reduced Annuities, now standing in the Name of the dissolved College of Hertford, in the University of Oxford; and also to receive Dividends due upon such Annuities.	The whole act.
56 Geo. 3. c. 96	Bank of England (Advance) Act 1816	An Act for establishing an Agreement with the Governor and Company of the Bank of England, for advancing the Sum of Three Millions for the Service of the Year One thousand eight hundred and sixteen -	Except Sections Three and Five.
56 Geo. 3. c. 98	Consolidated Fund Act 1816	An Act to unite and consolidate into One Fund all the Public Revenues of Great Britain and Ireland, and to provide for the Application thereof to the general Service of the United Kingdom	Sections Four to Twelve. Section Thirteen to "seventeen," and from " and that the several " to end of that Section. Section Fourteen, so far as it relates to payment out of the revenues therein mentioned. Section Sixteen, so far as it relates to the office of Vice Treasurer for Ireland. Sections Seventeen, Nineteen to Twenty-one, and Twenty-three to Twenty-eight.
56 Geo. 3. c. 102	Insolvent Debtors (England) Act 1816	An Act to amend the Act of the Fifty-third Year of His present Majesty, intituled An Act for the Relief of Insolvent Debtors in England; and to give further Powers to the Court appointed by the said Act.	The whole act.
56 Geo. 3. c. 104	Excise (No. 2) Act 1816	An Act the title of which begins with the words,—An Act for the making more effectual Provision for the Prevention of Smuggling,— and ends with the words,—drawback to give Notice of Shipment	Except Sections Twenty-five and Twenty-six.
56 Geo. 3. c. 105	Trade in Spirits Act 1816	An Act the title of which begins with the words,—An Act to amend and continue, until the End of the next Session,—and ends with the words,— Spirits imported and exported between England and Scotland and Ireland respectively.	The whole act.
56 Geo. 3. c. 106	Duties on Spirits, etc. (Scotland) Act 1816	An Act the title of which begins with the words,—An Act to repeal the Duties payable in Scotland upon Wash and Spirits,—and ends with the words,—Tenth Day of November One thousand eight hundred and eighteen.	The whole act.
56 Geo. 3. c. 107	Inventories (Scotland) Act 1816	An Act to amend an Act of the last Session of Parliament relating to Stamp Duties in Great Britain, so far as relates to Inventories to be exhibited and recorded in any Commissary Court in Scotland.	The whole act.
56 Geo. 3. c. 108	Excise (No. 3) Act 1816	An Act to repeal certain Drawbacks and Countervailing Duties of Excise on Beer and Malt; to alter the Drawbacks on Plate Glass, and to prevent Frauds therein.	The whole act.
56 Geo. 3. c. 109	Exportation (No. 3) Act 1816	An Act to continue, until the Fifth Day of July One thousand eight hundred and seventeen, an Act of the Forty-sixth Year of His present Majesty, for granting an additional Bounty on the Exportation of the Silk Manufactures of Great Britain.	The whole act.
56 Geo. 3. c. 111	Duties on Spirits (Ireland) Act 1816	An Act to repeal Part of the Duty on Spirits distilled in Ireland, to reduce the Drawback on such Spirits exported to Foreign Parts, and to make further Regulations for the Collection of the said Duties, and the Duties on Licences for retailing Spirituous and other Liquors in Ireland.	The whole act.
56 Geo. 3. c. 116	Prisoner Act 1816	An Act to explain and amend an Act, passed in the Fifty-fifth Year of the Reign of His present Majesty, intituled An Act for the Abolition of Gaol and other Fees connected with the Gaols in England	Except Section Three to "England,".
56 Geo. 3. c. 120	Prisoners Returns (Ireland) Act 1816	An Act to prevent Delay in the Administration of Persons committed for, and Misdemeanours Offices Criminal	Section Three, except as to the county of the city of Dublin.
56 Geo. 3. c. 121	Militia Pay (Ireland) Act 1816	An Act for defraying, until the Twenty-fifth Day of June One thousand eight hundred and seventeen, the Charge of the Pay and Cloathing of the Militia of Ireland; and for making Allowances in certain Cases to Subaltern Officers of the said Militia during Peace.	The whole act.
56 Geo. 3. c. 122	Court of Exchequer (Ireland) Act 1816	An Act to make Provision for securing, for a Time to be limited, the Profits of the Office of Clerk of the Pleas of His Majesty's Court of Exchequer in Ireland.	The whole act.
56 Geo. 3. c. 123	Residence on Benefices, etc. (England) (No. 2) Act 1816	An Act the title of which begins with the words,—An Act to continue, until the Fifth Day of April,—and ends with the words,—Residence of such Persons on their Benefices in England.	The whole act.
56 Geo. 3. c. 124	Bringing of Coals to London, etc. Act 1816	An Act to continue, until the First Day of August One thousand eight hundred and seventeen, Two Acts of the Fiftieth and Fifty-fifth Years of His present Majesty, allowing the bringing of Coals, Culm, and Cinders, to London and Westminster.	The whole act.
56 Geo. 3. c. 125	Malicious Damage (Scotland) Act 1816	An Act the title of which begins with the words,—An Act for the more effectual Punishment of Persons,—and ends with the words,—Owners of such Property to recover Damages for the Injury sustained.	Repealed except as to Scotland.
56 Geo. 3. c. 126	Insolvent Debtors (Ireland) Act 1816	An Act to amend an Act of the Fifty-third Year of His present Majesty, for the Relief of Insolvent Debtors in Ireland.	The whole act.
56 Geo. 3. c. 131	Peace Preservation Act 1816	An Act to revive and continue, until the First Day of June One thousand eight hundred and seventeen, an Act of the Fifty-second Year of His present Majesty, for the more effectual Preservation of the Peace, by enforcing the Duties of watching and warding.	The whole act.
56 Geo. 3. c. 139	Parish Apprentices Act 1816	An Act to prevent the binding of Parishes or Places in Ireland	Section Eight from " unless " to " be legally settled,".
56 Geo. 3. c. 142	Appropriation Act 1816	An Act the title of which begins with the words,—An Act for granting to His Majesty a certain Sum out of the Consolidated Fund,—and ends with the words,—appropriating the Supplies granted in this Session of Parliament.	The whole act.
57 Geo. 3. c. 1	Cape of Good Hope, etc. Trade Act 1817	An Act the title of which begins with the words,—An Act to continue and extend the Provisions of an Act of the Forty-ninth Year,—and ends with the words,—Trade of the Island of Mauritius.	The whole act.
57 Geo. 3. c. 2	Exchequer Bills Act 1817	An Act for raising the Sum of Twenty-four Millions, by Exchequer Bills, for the Service of the Year One thousand eight hundred and seventeen.	The whole act.
57 Geo. 3. c. 3	Habeas Corpus Suspension Act 1817	An Act to empower His Majesty to secure and detain such Persons as His Majesty shall suspect are conspiring against His Person and Government.	The whole act.
57 Geo. 3. c. 5	Duties on Malt, etc. Act 1817	An Act the title of which begins with the words,—An Act for continuing to His Majesty certain Duties on Malt,—and ends with the words,—Service of the Year One thousand eight hundred and seventeen.	The whole act.
57 Geo. 3. c. 6	Treason Act 1817	An Act the title of which begins with the words,—An Act to make perpetual certain Parts of an Act of the Thirty-sixth Year,—and ends with the words,— Treasonable Practices and Attempts	Sections Two and Three. Section Four so far as it relates to the Prince Regent.
57 Geo. 3. c. 7	Allegiance of Sea and Land Forces Act 1817	An Act the title of which begins with the words,—An Act to revive and make perpetual Two Acts of the Thirty-seventh Year,—and ends with the words,—Forces by Sea or Land from their Duty and Allegiance to His Majesty, or to incite them to Mutiny or Disobedience.	The whole act.
57 Geo. 3. c. 8	Coffee, etc. Act 1817	An Act the title of which begins with the words,—An Act to continue, until the Fifth Day of April,—and ends with the words,—Dealers to sell any Quantity of Coffee not exceeding Eight Pounds Weight without Permit.	The whole act.
57 Geo. 3. c. 9	Comptroller of Barrack Department Act 1817	An Act for vesting all Estates and Property occupied for the Barrack Service in the Comptroller of the Barrack Department; and for granting certain Powers to the said Comptroller.	The whole act.
57 Geo. 3. c. 11	Court of King's Bench Act 1817	An Act to facilitate the Progress of Business in the Court of King's Bench in Westminster Hall.	The whole act.
57 Geo. 3. c. 12	Mutiny Act 1817	An Act for punishing Mutiny and Desertion; and for the better Payment of the Army and their Quarters.	The whole act.
57 Geo. 3. c. 13	Marine Mutiny Act 1817	An Act for the regulating of His Majesty's Royal Marine Forces while on Shore.	The whole act.
57 Geo. 3. c. 15	Exportation Act 1817	An Act to continue, until the Fifth Day of July One thousand eight hundred and eighteen, an Act of the Forty-sixth Year of His present Majesty, for granting an additional Bounty on the Exportation of the Silk Manufactures of Great Britain.	The whole act.
57 Geo. 3. c. 16	Exchequer Bills (No. 2) Act 1817	An Act for raising the Sum of Eighteen Millions, by Exchequer Bills, for the Service of the Year One thousand eight hundred and seventeen.	The whole act.
57 Geo. 3. c. 17	Exportation (No. 2) Act 1817	An Act to repeal, during the Continuance of Peace, so much of an Act of the Ninth Year of His present Majesty as prohibits the Exportation of Pig and Bar Iron, and certain Naval Stores, unless the Pre-emption thereof be offered to the Commissioners of His Majesty's Navy.	The whole act.
57 Geo. 3. c. 19	Seditious Meetings Act 1817	An Act for the more effectually preventing Seditious Meetings and Assemblies	Sections One to Twenty-two. Section Twenty-three, the words " or to His Royal Highness the Prince Regent,". Section Thirty-six to " prosecuted if this Act had not been made; " and from " Provided always, that nothing " to end of that Section. The last Section.
57 Geo. 3. c. 21	Arms (Ireland) Act 1817	An Act to revive and continue for Two Years, and from thence until the End of the then next Session of Parliament, Two Acts made in the Forty-seventh and Fiftieth Years of His present Majesty, for the preventing improper Persons from having Arms in Ireland.	The whole act.
57 Geo. 3. c. 23	Importation Act 1817	An Act to further continue, until the Twenty-fifth Day of March One thousand eight hundred and twenty, an Act of the Seventh Year of King George the Second, for the free Importation of Cochineal and Indigo.	The whole act.
57 Geo. 3. c. 25	House Tax Act 1817	An Act the title of which begins with the words,—An Act to explain and amend an Act, made in the Forty-eighth Year,—and ends with the words,—indulging Goods, Wares, or Merchandise, from the Duties charged by the said Act	Section One from " such Person or" to " under the said Act,". Section Two from " and all" to " situated; " and the words " and Declaration " (wherever they occur). Sections Three and Five.
57 Geo. 3. c. 26	National Debt Commissioners Act 1817	An Act to amend and render more effectual Four several Acts passed in the Forty-eighth, Forty-ninth, Fifty-second, and Fifty-fourth Years of His present Majesty, for enabling the Commissioners for the Reduction of the National Debt to grant Life Annuities.	The whole act.
57 Geo. 3. c. 27	Duties on Buckwheat Act 1817	An Act for repealing the Duties of Customs on Buck Wheat imported into this Kingdom, and for granting other Duties, until the Twenty-fifth Day of March One thousand eight hundred and twenty-one, in lieu thereof.	The whole act.
57 Geo. 3. c. 31	Lotteries Act 1817	An Act for granting to his Majesty a Sum of Money to be raised by Lotteries.	The whole act.
57 Geo. 3. c. 34	Public Works Loans Act 1817	An Act to authorise the Issue of Exchequer Bills, and the Advance of Money out of the Consolidated Fund, to a limited Amount, for the carrying on of Public Works and Fisheries in the United Kingdom, and Employment of the Poor in Great Britain, in manner therein mentioned.	Except the following Sections and parts of Sections so far as they relate to Great Britain; namely, -Sections Eight, Ten, Eleven, Thirteen, and Fourteen, Section Seventeen to " Purposes of this Act", from "and the said " to " under this Act," and from "under the" to "aforesaid;", Section Twenty- one to " Securities," and from "in lieu to end of that Section, and Sections Twenty-two, Twenty-three, Twenty-six, Forty-one to Forty-eight, and Sixty-four, but excluding from the exception so much as relates to exchequer bills, and also Sections Thirteen and Fourteen so far as they relate to applications from and advances to parishes.
57 Geo. 3. c. 35	Mutiny (No. 2) Act 1817	An Act for punishing Mutiny and Desertion; and for the better Payment of the Army and their Quarters.	The whole act.
57 Geo. 3. c. 38	Peace Preservation Act 1817	An Act to continue, until the Fifteenth Day of June One thousand eight hundred and eighteen, an Act of the Fifty-second Year of His present Majesty, for the more effectual Preservation of the Peace, by enforcing the Duties of Watching and Warding.	The whole act.
57 Geo. 3. c. 40	Distillation (Scotland) Act 1817	An Act to authorize the rewarding Officers of the Customs for their Services in preventing illicit Distillation in Scotland, under an Act passed in the last Session of Parliament.	The whole act.
57 Geo. 3. c. 41	Paymaster General Act 1817	An Act to repeal Two Acts passed in the Fifty-fourth and Fifty-fifth Years of His present Majesty, relating to the Office of the Agent General, and for transferring the Duties of the said Office to the Offices of the Paymaster General and Secretary at War	Except Section Two from " from and after the time " to end of that Section, Section Seven to " to the Paymaster General; " and Section Eight.
57 Geo. 3. c. 42	Exportation from the Bahamas Act 1817	An Act the title of which begins with the words,—An Act to revive and continue, until the Twenty-fifth Day of March,—and ends with the words,—in American Ships coming in Ballast.	The whole act.
57 Geo. 3. c. 43	Bounties on Sugar Act 1817	An Act for granting, for Two Years from the Fifth Day of July One thousand eight hundred and seventeen, Bounties on Sugar refined otherwise than by claying.	The whole act.
57 Geo. 3. c. 44	Yeomanry Act 1817	An Act to allow Corps of Yeomanry or Volunteer Cavalry, when assembled for the Suppression of Riots or Tumults, to be Quartered and Billetted, and Officers on Half Pay to hold certain Commands in such Corps, and to exempt Members in such Corps from serving the Office of Constable	Section Two.
57 Geo. 3. c. 45	Continuation of Persons in Offices, etc. Act 1817	An Act the title of which begins with the words,—An Act for the Continuance of all and every Person or Persons in any and every Office,—and ends with the words,—until removed or discharged therefrom by the succeeding King or Queen of this Realm.	The whole act.
57 Geo. 3. c. 47	Annuity to Lord Colchester, etc. Act 1817	An Act for settling and securing Annuities on Lord Colchester, and on the next Person to whom the Title of Lord Colchester shall descend, in Consideration of his eminent Services.	The whole act.
57 Geo. 3. c. 50	Peace Preservation (Ireland) Act 1817	An Act to continue an Act made in the Fifty-fourth Year of His present Majesty's Reign, intituled An Act to provide for the preserving and restoring of Peace in such Parts of Ireland as may at any Time be disturbed by Seditious Persons entering into unlawful Combinations or Conspiracies.	The whole act.
57 Geo. 3. c. 53	Murders Abroad Act 1817	An Act for the more effectual Punishment of Murders and Manslaughter committed in Places not within His Majesty's Dominions	Section One so far as it relates to the Settlement in the day of Honduras and to New Zealand and Otaheite. Sections Two and Three. Repealed as to all Her Majesty's Dominions.
57 Geo. 3. c. 56	Recognisances (Ireland) Act 1817	An Act to amend the Laws in respect to forfeited Recognizances in Ireland	Sections One and Five to Sixteen. Section Seventeen from " the Sum " to " forfeited; and ".
57 Geo. 3. c. 57	Militia Act 1817	An Act to empower His Majesty to suspend Training, and to regulate the Quotas of the Militia	Section One as far as it relates to the Militia raised in England and Ireland. Section Two. Section Three so far as it relates to enlisting to serve or offering to enlist to serve the United Company of Merchants of England trading to the East Indies. Section Four.
57 Geo. 3. c. 60	Court of Exchequer Act 1817	An Act to regulate certain Offices in the Court of Exchequer in England.	The whole act.
57 Geo. 3. c. 62	Public Offices (Ireland) Act 1817	An Act to abolish certain Offices, and to regulate certain other Offices, in Ireland	Section One. Section Two to " Records of Ireland;". Sections Three, Four and Seven. Section Eight to " wholly abolished; and ".
57 Geo. 3. c. 64	Public Offices (Scotland) Act 1817	An Act to abolish certain Offices, and regulate others in Scotland	Sections Seven, Eight, Twelve, and Fourteen.
57 Geo. 3. c. 69	Sea Fisheries (Ireland) Act 1817	An Act to continue until the Twenty-ninth Day of September One thousand eight hundred and eighteen, and to amend an Act passed in Ireland, in the Thirty-sixth Year of His present Majesty, for the Improvement and Extension of the Fisheries on the Coasts of Ireland.	The whole act.
57 Geo. 3. c. 70	Dissenters (Ireland) Act 1817	An Act to relieve Persons impugning the Doctrine of the Holy Trinity from certain Penalties in Ireland	From " That such " to " : And ".
57 Geo. 3. c. 72	Trade in Spirits Act 1817	An Act to continue until the end of the next Session of Parliament Two Acts made in the Fifty-fourth and Fifty-sixth Years of His present Majesty, for regulating the Trade in Spirits between Great Britain and Ireland respectively.	The whole act.
57 Geo. 3. c. 78	Quartering of Soldiers Act 1817	An Act for fixing the Rates of Subsistence to be paid to Innkeepers and others on quartering Soldiers.	The whole act.
57 Geo. 3. c. 80	Exchequer Bills (No. 3) Act 1817	An Act for raising the Sum of Nine Millions, by Exchequer Bills, for the Service of the Year One thousand eight hundred and seventeen.	The whole act.
57 Geo. 3. c. 81	Treasury Bills (Ireland) Act 1817	An Act for raising the Sum of Three Millions five hundred thousand Pounds British Currency, by Treasury Bills, in Ireland, for the Services of the Year One thousand eight hundred and seventeen.	The whole act.
57 Geo. 3. c. 84	Offices of Exchequer Act 1817	An Act to regulate the Offices of His Majesty's Exchequer in England and Ireland respectively.	The whole act.
57 Geo. 3. c. 85	Importation (No. 2) Act 1817	An Act the title of which begins with the words,—An Act to permit, until the Fourteenth Day of October,—and ends with the words,—taking the same out of Warehouse free of Duty, and who have acted in obedience thereto.	The whole act.
57 Geo. 3. c. 100	Land Tax Redemption Act 1817	An Act to renew the Powers of exonerating Small Livings and Charitable Institutions from the Land Tax, and for making further Provision for the Redemption of the Land Tax	Sections One to Eleven, Twenty-two, Twenty-five and Twenty-six.
57 Geo. 3. c. 101	Vexatious Arrests Act 1817	An Act the title of which begins with the words,—An Act to continue an Act, intituled An Act further to extend and render more effectual certain Provisions,—and ends with the words,—amending the Provisions of the said former Acts.	The whole act.
57 Geo. 3. c. 102	Militia Pay (Great Britain) Act 1817	An Act the title of which begins with the words,—An Act to defray the Charge of the Pay,—and ends with the words,—Militia, until the Twenty-fifth Day of March One thousand eight hundred and eighteen.	The whole act.
57 Geo. 3. c. 103	Militia Pay (Ireland) Act 1817	An Act for defraying, until the Twenty-fifth Day of June One thousand eight hundred and eighteen, the Charge of the Pay and Cloathing of the Militia of Ireland; and for making Allowances in certain Cases to Subaltern Officers of the said Militia during Peace.	The whole act.
57 Geo. 3. c. 104	Militia (Ireland) Act 1817	An Act to reduce the Number of Serjeants, Corporals, and Drummers in the Militia of Ireland whilst disembodied.	The whole act.
57 Geo. 3. c. 109	Abolition of a Certain Subsidy Act 1817	An Act to abolish the Subsidy and Alnage of the Old and New Draperies, and of all Woollen Manufactures, in Ireland; and to authorize the Payment, out of the Consolidated Fund of an Annual Sum to John Lord de Blaquiere, during the Continuance of his Interest in the Office of Alnager.	The whole act.
57 Geo. 3. c. 110	Duties on Spirits (Ireland) Act 1817	An Act to make further Regulations for the better collecting and securing the Duties upon Spirits distilled in Ireland.	The whole act.
57 Geo. 3. c. 114	Bringing of Coals to London, etc. Act 1817	An Act to continue, until the First Day of August One thousand eight hundred and eighteen, Two Acts of His present Majesty, allowing the bringing of Coals, Culm, and Cinders to London and Westminster.	The whole act.
57 Geo. 3. c. 120	East India Company Act 1817	An Act to authorize the Court of Directors of the East India Company to make extraordinary Allowances, in certain Cases, to the Owners of certain Ships in the Service of the said Company.	The whole act.
57 Geo. 3. c. 124	Public Works Loans (No. 2) Act 1817	An Act to amend an Act made in the present Session of Parliament, for authorising the Issue of Exchequer Bills, and the Advance of Money for carrying on Public Works and Fisheries, and Employment of the Poor	Except Sections Seven and Fourteen, so far as they relate to Great Britain.
57 Geo. 3. c. 126	Destroying Stocking Frames, etc. Act 1817	An Act the title of which begins with the words,—An Act to repeal an Act, passed in the Fifty-fourth Year,—and ends with the words,—other Provisions in lieu thereof.	The whole act.
57 Geo. 3. c. 132	Appropriation Act 1817	An Act for applying certain Monies therein mentioned for the Service of the Year One thousand eight hundred and seventeen, and for further appropriating the Supplies granted in this Session of Parliament.	The whole act.
58 Geo. 3. c. 1	Habeas Corpus Suspension Act 1818	An Act to repeal an Act made in the last Session of Parliament, intituled An Act to empower His Majesty to secure and detain such Persons as His Majesty shall suspect are conspiring against His Person and Government.	The whole act.
58 Geo. 3. c. 2	Grand Jury Presentments (Ireland) Act 1818	An Act the title of which begins with the words,—An Act to suspend, until the End of the present Session,—and ends with the words,—Public Meetings in Ireland, and for accounting for Money raised by such Presentments.	The whole act.
58 Geo. 3. c. 3	Duties on Malt, etc. Act 1818	An Act for continuing to His Majesty certain Duties on Malt, Sugar, Tobacco, and Snuff, in Great Britain; and on Pensions, Offices, and Personal Estates in England; for the Service of the Year One thousand eight hundred and eighteen.	The whole act.
58 Geo. 3. c. 4	Exchequer Bills Act 1818	An Act for raising the Sum of Thirty Millions, by Exchequer Bills, for the Service of the Year One thousand eight hundred and eighteen.	The whole act.
58 Geo. 3. c. 6	Apprehension of Suspected Persons, etc. Act 1818	An Act the title of which begins with the words,—An Act for Indemnifying Persons who, since the Twenty-sixth Day of January,—and ends with the words,—Suppression of tumultuous and unlawful Assemblies.	The whole act.
58 Geo. 3. c. 7	Indemnity, Importation and Exportation Act 1818	An Act to indemnify all Persons who have been concerned in advising, issuing or carrying into execution any Order or Orders for permitting the Importation and Exportation of certain Goods and Commodities in Foreign Bottoms into and out of certain of His Majesty's West India Islands.	The whole act.
58 Geo. 3. c. 9	Duties on Madder Act 1818	An Act to further continue, until the Fifth Day of July One thousand eight hundred and eighteen, Two Acts of the Fifty-fourth Year of His present Majesty, for repealing the Duties of Customs on Madder imported into Great Britain, and for granting other Duties in lieu thereof.	The whole act.
58 Geo. 3. c. 10	Mutiny Act Amendment, etc. Act 1818	An Act to rectify a Mistake in an Act, passed in the Fifty-fifth Year of the Reign of His present Majesty, for punishing Mutiny and Desertion, and to indemnify certain Persons in relation thereto.	The whole act.
58 Geo. 3. c. 11	Mutiny Act 1818	An Act for punishing Mutiny and Desertion; and for the better Payment of the Army and their Quarters.	The whole act.
58 Geo. 3. c. 12	Marine Mutiny Act 1818	An Act for the regulating of His Majesty's Royal Marine Forces while on Shore.	The whole act.
58 Geo. 3. c. 14	Circulation of Tokens, etc. Act 1818	An Act to amend an Act of the last Session of Parliament, for preventing the further Circulation of Dollars and Tokens issued by the Governor and Company of the Bank of England.	The whole act.
58 Geo. 3. c. 15	Greenland Fisheries Act 1818	An Act to amend an Act made in the Twenty-sixth Year of His present Majesty, for the Encouragement of the Fisheries carried on in the Greenland Seas and Davis's Streights, so far as relates to the Oaths thereby required to be taken.	The whole act.
58 Geo. 3. c. 22	Quartering of Soldiers Act 1818	An Act for fixing the Rates of Subsistence to be paid to Innkeepers and others on quartering Soldiers.	The whole act.
58 Geo. 3. c. 25	Annuity to Duchess of Cumberland Act 1818	An Act for enabling His Majesty to settle an Annuity on Her Royal Highness the Princess of Cumberland, in case of Her surviving His Royal Highness the Duke of Cumberland.	The whole act.
58 Geo. 3. c. 26	Trade in Spirits Act 1818	An Act to continue until the Twenty-fifth Day of March One thousand eight hundred and nineteen, Two Acts made in the Fifty-fourth and Fifty-sixth Years of His present Majesty's Reign, for regulating the Trade in Spirits between Great Britain and Ireland reciprocally, and to amend the same.	The whole act.
58 Geo. 3. c. 28	Spirits (Strength Ascertainment) Act 1818	An Act to repeal an Act made in the Fifty-sixth Year of His present Majesty's Reign, for establishing the Use of an Hydrometer called Sikes's Hydrometer, in ascertaining the Strength of Spirits, instead of Clarke's Hydrometer; and for making other Provisions in lieu thereof	Except Sections Two and Three.
58 Geo. 3. c. 30	Costs Act 1818	An Act for preventing frivolous and vexatious Arrests of Assault and Battery, and for slanderous Words, in Courts	Section One, so far as it relates to the courts of great sessions for the principality of Wales or for the county palatine of Chester.
58 Geo. 3. c. 31	Court Houses (Ireland) Act 1818	An Act to amend an Act passed in the Fifty-seventh Year of His Majesty's Reign, to make further Regulations for the building and repairing of Court Houses and Sessions Houses in Ireland	Section One, except as to the county of the city of Dublin. Section Three.
58 Geo. 3. c. 32	Houses of Correction (England) Act 1818	An Act to amend so much of an Act of the Fifty-fifth Year of His present Majesty, as relates to the Salaries of Clergymen officiating as Chaplains in Houses of Correction.	The whole act.
58 Geo. 3. c. 37	Restriction on Cash Payments Act 1818	An Act for further continuing, until the Fifth Day of July One thousand eight hundred and nineteen, an Act of the Forty-fourth Year of His present Majesty, to continue the Restrictions contained in several Acts of His present Majesty, on Payments of Cash by the Bank of England.	The whole act.
58 Geo. 3. c. 40	Yeomanry Corps. (Ireland) Act 1818	An Act to continue the Laws now in force relating to Yeomanry Corps in Ireland.	The whole act.
58 Geo. 3. c. 45	Church Building Act 1818	An Act for building and promoting the building of additional Churches in populous Parishes.	Sections One to Nine. Section Thirteen from "and in which the " to "mentioned;". Sections Eighteen and Twenty. Section Twenty-two, the words "be enrolled in the High Court of Chancery, and ". Section Twenty-three, the words "enrolled and ". Sections Thirty-seven, Seventy-one, and Eighty-six. The rest of this Act so far as it confers power to enforce payment of any rate.
58 Geo. 3. c. 47	Hospitals (Ireland) Act 1818	An Act to establish Fever Hospitals, and to make other Regulations for Relief of the suffering Poor, and for preventing the Increase of Infectious Fevers in Ireland	Section One from " save " to " of all parties;". Section Four. Sections Five to Eight except as to the county of the city of Dublin. Section Nine. Section Sixteen from " the Defendant " to " Evidence;".
58 Geo. 3. c. 50	Duties on Spirits, etc. (Scotland) Act 1818	An Act the title of which begins with the words,—An Act to amend and continue, until the Tenth Day of November,—and ends with the words,— Regulations for the Distillation of Spirits from Corn, for Home Consumption, in Scotland.	The whole act.
58 Geo. 3. c. 52	Peace Preservation Act 1818	An Act to continue, until the Twentieth Day of June One thousand eight hundred and twenty, an Act of the Fifty-second Year of His present Majesty, for the more effectual Preservation of the Peace, by enforcing the Duties of Watching and Warding.	The whole act.
58 Geo. 3. c. 53	Annuities to Duke, etc., of Kent Act 1818	An Act for enabling His Majesty to make further Provision for His Royal Highness the Duke of Kent, and to settle an Annuity on the Princess of Leiningen, in case she shall survive His said Royal Highness.	The whole act.
58 Geo. 3. c. 55	Duties on Madder (No. 2) Act 1818	An Act to continue until the Fifth Day of July One thousand eight hundred and nineteen, Two Acts of the Fifty-fourth Year of His present Majesty, for repealing the Duties of Customs on Madder imported into Great Britain, and for granting other Duties in lieu thereof.	The whole act.
58 Geo. 3. c. 57	Licensed Grocers (Ireland) Act 1818	An Act to amend an Act of the Fifty-fifth Year of His present Majesty, for granting Duties of Excise in Ireland upon certain Licences, and for securing the Payment of such Duties, and the regulating the issuing of such Licences	Sections One and Three to Six.
58 Geo. 3. c. 58	Militia Pay (Great Britain) Act 1818	An Act the title of which begins with the words,—An Act to defray the Charge of the Pay,—and ends with the words,—Militia, until the Twenty-fifth Day of March One thousand eight hundred and nineteen.	The whole act.
58 Geo. 3. c. 59	Militia Pay (Ireland) Act 1818	An Act for defraying, until the Twenty-fifth Day of June One thousand eight hundred and nineteen, the Charge of the Pay and Clothing of the Militia of Ireland; and for making Allowances in certain Cases to Subaltern Officers of the said Militia during Peace.	The whole act.
58 Geo. 3. c. 60	Restriction on Cash Payments (No. 2) Act 1818	An Act to continue, until Three Months after the ceasing of any Restriction imposed on the Bank of England from issuing Cash in Payment, the several Acts for confirming and continuing the Restrictions on Payments in Cash by the Bank of Ireland.	The whole act.
58 Geo. 3. c. 62	Bringing of Coals to London, etc. Act 1818	An Act to continue, until the First Day of August One thousand eight hundred and nineteen, Two Acts of His present Majesty, allowing the bringing of Coals, Culm, and Cinders to London and Westminster.	The whole act.
58 Geo. 3. c. 63	Importation (No. 2) Act 1818	An Act to revive and continue, until the Twenty-fifth Day of March One thousand eight hundred and nineteen, an Act made in the Forty-ninth Year of His present Majesty, to permit the Importation of Tobacco from any Place whatever.	The whole act.
58 Geo. 3. c. 66	National Debt Commissioners Act 1818	An Act to empower any Three or more of the Commissioners for the Reduction of the National Debt to exercise all the Powers and Authorities given to the said Commissioners by any Act or Acts of Parliament	Section Two.
58 Geo. 3. c. 69	Vestries Act 1818	An Act for the Regulation of Parish Vestries	Section Five.
58 Geo. 3. c. 71	Lotteries Act 1818	An Act for granting to His Majesty a Sum of Money to be raised by Lotteries.	The whole act.
58 Geo. 3. c. 73	Payment of Regimental Debts Act 1818	An Act for regulating the Payment of Regimental Debts, and the Distribution of the Effects of Officers and Soldiers dying in Service, and the Receipt of Sums due to Soldiers	Except Section Four and Section Six so far as it relates to any other matter than false representation and personation for the purpose of obtaining prize or bounty money, grant or other allowance of money.
58 Geo. 3. c. 78	Duties on Malt, etc. (Ireland) Act 1818	An Act to make further Provision for the better securing the Collection of the Duties on Malt, and to amend the Laws relating to Brewers in Ireland.	The whole act.
58 Geo. 3. c. 81	Infant Executors (Ireland) Act 1818	An Act for extending to that Part of the United Kingdom called Ireland certain Provisions of the Parliament of Great Britain in relation to Executors who have attained the Age of Twenty-one Years, and to Matrimonial Contracts	Section Three.
58 Geo. 3. c. 83	Hiring of Ships by East India Company Act 1818	An Act to amend and reduce into One Act the several Laws relating to the Manner in which the East India Company are required to hire Ships.	Repealed as to all Her Majesty's Dominions.
58 Geo. 3. c. 84	Confirmation of Marriages in India Act 1818	An Act to remove Doubts as to the Validity of certain Marriages had and solemnized within the British Territories in India.	Repealed as to all Her Majesty's Dominions.
58 Geo. 3. c. 86	Exchequer Bills (No. 2) Act 1818	An Act for raising the Sum of Eleven million six hundred thousand Pounds, by Exchequer Bills, for the Service of the Year One thousand eight hundred and eighteen.	The whole act.
58 Geo. 3. c. 87	Treasury Bills (Ireland) Act 1818	An Act for raising the Sum of Eight hundred thousand Pounds, British Currency, by Treasury Bills, in Ireland, for the Service of the Year One thousand eight hundred and eighteen.	The whole act.
58 Geo. 3. c. 88	Public Works Loans Act 1818	An Act the title of which begins with the words,—An Act to amend Two Acts, made in the last Session,—and ends with the words,—carrying the said Acts into Execution in Ireland.	The whole act.
58 Geo. 3. c. 90	Care of the King During his Illness, etc. Act 1818	An Act the title of which begins with the words,—An Act to alter and amend certain of the Provisions of an Act passed in the Fifty-first Year,—and ends with the words,—Resumption of the Excised Poll Authority by His Majesty.	The whole act.
58 Geo. 3. c. 91	Inquiry Concerning Charities (England) Act 1818	An Act for appointing Commissioners to inquire concerning Charities in England for the Education of the Poor.	The whole act.
58 Geo. 3. c. 96	Aliens Act 1818	An Act the title of which begins with the words,—An Act to continue, for the Term of Two Years,—and ends with the words,—Regulations respecting Aliens arriving in or resident in this Kingdom, in certain Cases.	The whole act.
58 Geo. 3. c. 97	Aliens (No. 2) Act 1818	An Act to prevent Aliens, until the Twenty-fifth Day of March One thousand eight hundred and nineteen, from becoming naturalized, or being made or becoming Denizens, except in certain Cases.	The whole act.
58 Geo. 3. c. 101	Appropriation Act 1818	An Act for applying certain Monies therein mentioned for the Service of the Year One thousand eight hundred and eighteen.	The whole act.
59 Geo. 3. c. 1	Care of the King During his Illness Act 1819	An Act to provide for the Care of His Majesty's Royal Person during the Continuance of His Majesty's Illness.	The whole act.
59 Geo. 3. c. 2	Westminster Parliamentary Elections Act 1819	An Act the title of which begins with the words,—An Act for reviving and further continuing, until the First Day of May,—and ends with the words,— Expenses of Hustings and Poll Clerks, so far as regards the City of Westminster.	The whole act.
59 Geo. 3. c. 3	Duties on Pensions Act 1819	An Act for continuing to His Majesty certain Duties on Malt, Sugar, Tobacco, and Snuff, in Great Britain; and on Pensions, Offices, and Personal Estates, in England; for the Service of the Year One thousand eight hundred and nineteen.	The whole act.
59 Geo. 3. c. 4	Exchequer Bills Act 1819	An Act for raising the Sum of Twenty Millions, by Exchequer Bills, for the Service of the Year One thousand eight hundred and nineteen.	The whole act.
59 Geo. 3. c. 7	Cutlery Trade Act 1819	An Act to regulate the Cutlery Trade in England	Section Seventeen.
59 Geo. 3. c. 8	Aliens Act 1819	An Act to continue, until the Twenty-fifth day of March One thousand eight hundred and twenty, an Act of the last Session of Parliament, for preventing Aliens from becoming naturalized, or being made or becoming Denizens, except in certain Cases.	The whole act.
59 Geo. 3. c. 9	Mutiny Act 1819	An Act for punishing Mutiny and Desertion; and for the better Payment of the Army and their Quarters.	The whole act.
59 Geo. 3. c. 10	Marine Mutiny Act 1819	An Act for the regulating of His Majesty's Royal Marine Forces while on Shore.	The whole act.
59 Geo. 3. c. 12	Poor Relief Act 1819	An Act to amend the Laws for the Relief of the Poor	Sections One to Three, Five to Ten, Fourteen to Sixteen, Eighteen, Twenty-seven, and Twenty-nine to Thirty-four. Section Thirty-six so far as it relates to 22 Geo. 3. c. 83.
59 Geo. 3. c. 14	Exportation from American Colonies Act 1819	An Act to continue, until the First Day of July One thousand eight hundred and twenty-three, an Act of the Forty-sixth year of His present Majesty, for permitting the Exportation of Wool from the British Plantations in America.	The whole act.
59 Geo. 3. c. 15	Customs Act 1819	An Act the title of which begins with the words,—An Act to continue, until the First Day of July,—and ends with the words,—United Company of Merchants of England trading to the East Indies.	The whole act.
59 Geo. 3. c. 16	Slave Trade Suppression, Netherlands Act 1819	An Act to carry into Effect the Treaty with the Netherlands, relating to the Slave Trade	Section Twelve.
59 Geo. 3. c. 19	Produce of Consolidated Fund Act 1819	An Act to render, until the Fifth Day of July One thousand eight hundred and twenty, the growing Produce of the Consolidated Fund of the United Kingdom, arising in Great Britain, available for the Public Service.	The whole act.
59 Geo. 3. c. 20	Exchequer Bills (No. 2) Act 1819	An Act to enable the Commissioners of His Majesty's Treasury to issue Exchequer Bills, on the Credit of such Aids or Supplies as have been or shall be granted by Parliament for the Service of the Year One thousand eight hundred and nineteen.	The whole act.
59 Geo. 3. c. 22	King's Household During his Illness Act 1819	An Act for the further Regulation of His Majesty's Household, and the Care of His Royal Person, during the Continuance of His Indisposition.	The whole act.
59 Geo. 3. c. 23	Restriction on Cash Payments Act 1819	An Act to restrain, until the End of the present Session of Parliament, the Governor and Company of the Bank of England from making Payments in Cash under certain Notices given by them for that Purpose.	The whole act.
59 Geo. 3. c. 24	Restriction on Cash Payments (Ireland) Act 1819	An Act to restrain, until the End of the present Session of Parliament, the Governor and Company of the Bank of Ireland from making Payments in the Gold Coin of this Realm, under certain Notices given by them.	The whole act.
59 Geo. 3. c. 26	Quartering of Soldiers Act 1819	An Act for fixing the Rates of Subsistence to be paid to Innkeepers and others on quartering Soldiers.	The whole act.
59 Geo. 3. c. 31	Claims of British Subjects on France Act 1819	An Act to enable certain Commissioners fully to carry into Effect several Conventions for liquidating Claims of British Subjects, and others, against the Governments of France and the Netherlands.	The whole act.
59 Geo. 3. c. 32	Duties on Tobacco, etc. Act 1819	An Act the title of which begins with the words,—An Act to continue, until the Fifth Day of July,—and ends with the words,—Tobacco and Snuff, and certain Excise Licences.	The whole act.
59 Geo. 3. c. 33	Customs (No. 2) Act 1819	An Act the title of which begins with the words,—An Act to continue, until the First Day of July,—and ends with the words,—United Company of Merchants of England trading to the East Indies.	The whole act.
59 Geo. 3. c. 34	Waterloo Subscription Fund Act 1819	An Act the title of which begins with the words,—An Act to amend and render more effectual several Acts,—and ends with the words,—Fund commonly called the Waterloo Subscription Fund.	The whole act.
59 Geo. 3. c. 35	Jury Trials (Scotland) Act 1819	An Act to amend an Act, passed in the Fifty-fifth Year of the Reign of His present Majesty, intituled An Act to facilitate the Administration of Justice in that part of the United Kingdom called Scotland, by extending Trial by Jury to Civil Causes	Sections One to Six and Ten to Twelve. Section Thirteen so far as it relates to the Judge Admiral. Sections Fifteen, Sixteen, Eighteen, Twenty, Twenty-three to Twenty-five, Twenty-eight to Thirty-four, and Thirty-six. Section Thirty-seven from " nothing " to end of that Section. Sections Thirty-eight to Fifty-five.
59 Geo. 3. c. 39	Payments into Receipt of the Exchequer Act 1819	An Act for the more frequent Payment, into the Receipt of the Exchequer at Westminster, of Monies arising from the Duties of Customs, Excise, Stamps, and Postage in England.	The whole act.
59 Geo. 3. c. 40	Benefices Act 1819	An Act to secure Spiritual Persons in the Possession of Benefices in certain Cases.	The whole act.
59 Geo. 3. c. 43	Contribution of Marquis Camden Act 1819	An Act to authorize the Receipt and Appropriation of certain Sums voluntarily contributed by the Most Noble John Jeffreys Marquis Camden, in aid of the Public Service.	The whole act.
59 Geo. 3. c. 44	Trials of Murders, etc., in Honduras Act 1819	An Act the title of which begins with the words,—An Act to amend an Act passed in the Fifty-seventh Year,—and ends with the words,—Trial of Murders, Manslaughters, Rapes, Robberies, and Burglaries committed within the Honduras.	Repealed as to all Her Majesty's Dominions.
59 Geo. 3. c. 32	Duties on Tobacco, etc. Act 1819	An Act the title of which begins with the words,—An Act to continue until the Fifth Day of July,—and ends with the words,—Tobacco and Snuff, and certain Excise Licences.	The whole act.
59 Geo. 3. c. 33	Customs (No. 2) Act 1819	An Act the title of which begins with the words,—An Act to continue, until the First Day of July,—and ends with the words,—United Company of Merchants of England trading to the East Indies.	The whole act.
59 Geo. 3. c. 34	Waterloo Subscription Fund Act 1819	An Act the title of which begins with the words,—An Act to amend and render more effectual several Acts,—and ends with the words,—Fund commonly called the Waterloo Subscription.	The whole act.
59 Geo. 3. c. 35	Jury Trials (Scotland) Act 1819	An Act to amend an Act, passed in the Fifty-fifth Year of the Reign of His present Majesty, intituled An Act to facilitate the Administration of Justice in that part of the United Kingdom called Scotland, by extending Trial by Jury to Civil Causes.	Sections One to Six and Ten to Twelve. Section Thirteen so far as it relates to the Judge Admiral. Section Fifteen from "Fourth," Twenty-three to Twenty-five, Twenty-eight to Thirty-four, and Thirty-six. Section Thirty-seven from "declaring" to end of that Section. Sections Thirty-eight to Fifty-five.
59 Geo. 3. c. 39	Payments into Receipt of the Exchequer Act 1819	An Act to secure the Payment into the Receipt of the Exchequer at Westminster, of Monies arising from the Duties of Customs, Excise, Stamps, and Postage, in Ireland.	The whole act.
59 Geo. 3. c. 40	Benefices Act 1819	An Act to secure Spiritual Persons in the Possession of Benefices in certain Cases.	The whole act.
59 Geo. 3. c. 43	Contribution of Marquis Camden Act 1819	An Act to authorize the Receipt and Appropriation of certain Sums voluntarily contributed by the Most Noble John Jeffreys Marquis Camden, in aid of the Public Service.	The whole act.
59 Geo. 3. c. 44	Trials of Murders, etc., in Honduras Act 1819	An Act the title of which begins with the words,—An Act to amend an Act passed in the Fifty-seventh Year,—and ends with the words,—Trial of Murders, Manslaughters, Rapes, Robberies, and Burglaries committed in Honduras.	Repealed as to all Her Majesty's Dominions.
59 Geo. 3. c. 46	Appeal of Murder, etc. Act 1819	An Act to abolish Appeals of Murder, Treason, Felony, or other Offences, and Wager of Battel, or joining Issue and Trial by Battel, in Writs of Right.	The whole act.
59 Geo. 3. c. 47	Barnstaple Elections Act 1819	An Act to indemnify Persons who shall give Evidence before the Lords Spiritual and Temporal on the Bill for preventing Bribery and Corruption at the Election of Members to serve in Parliament for the Borough of Barnstaple, in the County of Devon.	The whole act.
59 Geo. 3. c. 49	Resumption of Cash Payments, etc. Act 1819	An Act the title of which begins with the words,—An Act to continue the Restrictions contained in several Acts on Payments in Cash by the Bank of England,—and ends with the words,—Exportation of Gold and Silver.	The whole act.
59 Geo. 3. c. 54	Treaty with United States, etc. Act 1819	An Act to carry into Effect a Convention of Commerce concluded between His Majesty and the United States of America, and a Treaty with the Prince Regent of Portugal.	Repealed as to all Her Majesty's Dominions.
59 Geo. 3. c. 58	Wages of Merchant Seamen Act 1819	An Act for facilitating the Recovery of the Wages of Seamen in the Merchant Service.	The whole act.
59 Geo. 3. c. 60	Ordinations for Colonies Act 1819	An Act to permit the Archbishop of Canterbury and York, and the Bishop of London, for the Time being, to admit Persons into Holy Orders specially for the Colonies	Section Six.
59 Geo. 3. c. 61	Building, etc., of Gaols (Scotland) Act 1819	An Act the title of which begins with the words,—An Act to enable Counties and Stewartries in Scotland to give Aid to Royal Burghs,—and ends with the words,—not the Gaols of Royal Burghs.	The whole act.
59 Geo. 3. c. 65	Lotteries Act 1819	An Act for granting to His Majesty a Sum of Money to be raised by Lotteries.	The whole act.
59 Geo. 3. c. 67	Accounts of Colonial Revenues Act 1819	An Act the title of which begins with the words,—An Act to continue, until the Thirtieth Day of July,—and ends with the words,—Colonial Revenues in the Islands of Ceylon, Mauritius, Malta, Trinidad, and in the Settlements of the Cape of Good Hope.	The whole act.
59 Geo. 3. c. 70	Duelling (Scotland) Act 1819	An Act to repeal certain Acts of the Parliament of Scotland, regarding Duelling.	The whole act.
59 Geo. 3. c. 72	Excise (No. 3) Act 1819	An Act to grant to His Majesty an additional Duty of Excise on Tobacco in Ireland.	The whole act.
59 Geo. 3. c. 73	Importation, etc. Act 1819	An Act to repeal several Acts, requiring the Masters of Vessels carrying Certificate Goods to Ireland to take Duplicates of the Contents; prohibiting the Importation of certain wrought Goods, and the Exportation of Gunpowder when the Price shall exceed a certain Sum.	The whole act.
59 Geo. 3. c. 75	Trade in Spirits Act 1819	An Act to continue, until the Fifth Day of July One thousand eight hundred and twenty, Two Acts, made in the Fifty-fourth and Fifty-sixth Years of His present Majesty, for regulating the Trade in Spirits between Great Britain and Ireland reciprocally.	The whole act.
59 Geo. 3. c. 76	Bank of England Act 1819	An Act to establish further Regulations respecting Advances by the Bank of England for the Public Service, and the Purchase of Government Securities by the said Bank	Section Three from " nor " to end of that Section.
59 Geo. 3. c. 79	Bringing of Coals, etc., to London, etc. Act 1819	An Act to continue, until the First Day of August One thousand eight hundred and twenty, Two Acts of the Forty-fifth and Fiftieth Years of His present Majesty, allowing the bringing of Coals, Culm, and Cinders to London and Westminster by Inland Navigation.	The whole act.
59 Geo. 3. c. 81	Charities Inquiry (England) Act 1819	An Act the title of which begins with the words,—An Act to amend an Act of the last Session of Parliament,—and ends with the words,—from thence until the End of the then next Session of Parliament.	The whole act.
59 Geo. 3. c. 84	Kinsale Act 1819	An Act the title of which begins with the words,—An Act to amend the Laws for making,—and ends with the words,—faithful Accounts of all Monies levied under the same	Except Section Forty-nine.
59 Geo. 3. c. 87	Duties on Malt, etc. (Ireland) Act 1819	An Act to grant to His Majesty certain Duties of Excise in Ireland on Malt.	The whole act.
59 Geo. 3. c. 88	Duties on Malt, etc. (Great Britain) Act 1819	An Act the title of which begins with the words,—An Act to repeal the annual Excise Duties upon Malt,—and ends with the words,—Year ending the Fifth Day of July One thousand eight hundred and twenty.	The whole act.
59 Geo. 3. c. 89	Duties on Sweets, etc. Act 1819	An Act to continue, until the Tenth Day of October One thousand eight hundred and twenty-four, an Act made in the Fifty-seventh Year of His present Majesty, for suspending a Part of the Duties on Sweets or made Wines.	The whole act.
59 Geo. 3. c. 90	Duties on Soap, etc. (Great Britain) Act 1819	An Act for the Prevention of Frauds in the Duties on Soap; for preserving the Books or Papers called Specimens, left by Officers of Excise on the Premises of Traders; and for requiring more speedy Payment of the Excise Duties on Printed Calicoes.	The whole act.
59 Geo. 3. c. 92	Conveyance of Offenders (Ireland) Act 1819	An Act the title of which begins with the words,—An Act to enable Justices of the Peace in Ireland to act as such,—and ends with the words,—Officers for Neglect of Duty, and on Masters for Pillage of their Apprentices	Except Section Three.
59 Geo. 3. c. 93	Court of Exchequer (Ireland) Act 1819	An Act the title of which begins with the words,—An Act to continue for One Year,—and ends with the words,—Profits of the Office of Clerk of the Pleas of His Majesty's Court of Exchequer in Ireland.	The whole act.
59 Geo. 3. c. 99	Resumption of Cash Payments Act 1819	An Act to continue, until the First Day of June One thousand eight hundred and twenty-three, the Restrictions on Payments in Cash by the Bank of Ireland, and to direct the gradual Resumption of Cash Payments by the said Bank.	The whole act.
59 Geo. 3. c. 101	Transportation Act 1819	An Act to enlarge the Powers of an Act passed in the Fifty-sixth Year of His present Majesty, relative to the Transportation of Offenders, to continue until the First Day of May One thousand eight hundred and twenty-one.	The whole act.
59 Geo. 3. c. 106	Excise (Ireland) Act 1819	An Act to amend the several Acts for securing the Payment of the Duties of Excise upon certain Licences, and regulating the issuing of such Licences; and for securing the Duties upon Spirits distilled by licensed Distillers in Ireland.	The whole act.
59 Geo. 3. c. 107	Permits, etc. (Ireland) Act 1819	An Act to consolidate and amend several Acts for regulating the granting of Permits, and for the Conveyance and Protection of certain Goods in Ireland	The last Section.
59 Geo. 3. c. 112	Exportation Act 1819	An Act to grant, until the Fifth Day of July One thousand eight hundred and twenty-one, an additional Bounty on the Exportation of certain Silk Manufactures of Great Britain.	The whole act.
59 Geo. 3. c. 114	Duties in New South Wales Act 1819	An Act the title of which begins with the words,—An Act to stay Proceedings against any Governor,—and ends with the words,—Duty on Spirits made in the said Colony.	Repealed as to all Her Majesty's Dominions.
59 Geo. 3. c. 116	Militia Pay (Great Britain) Act 1819	An Act the title of which begins with the words,—An Act to defray the Charge of the Pay,—and ends with the words,—Militia, until the Twenty-fifth Day of March One thousand eight hundred and twenty.	The whole act.
59 Geo. 3. c. 117	Militia Pay (Ireland) Act 1819	An Act for defraying, until the Twenty-fifth Day of June One thousand eight hundred and twenty, the Charge of the Pay and Clothing of the Militia of Ireland; and for making Allowances to Officers and Quartermasters of the said Militia during Peace.	The whole act.
59 Geo. 3. c. 129	Insolvent Debtors (England) Act 1819	An Act to continue in force, until the Expiration of Three Calendar Months after the Commencement of the next Session of Parliament, Three Acts of His present Majesty, for the Relief of Insolvent Debtors in England.	The whole act.
59 Geo. 3. c. 130	Insolvent Debtors (Ireland) Act 1819	An Act to continue the several Acts for the Relief of Insolvent Debtors in Ireland, until the First Day of June One thousand eight hundred and twenty.	The whole act.
59 Geo. 3. c. 131	Exchequer Bills (No. 3) Act 1819	An Act for raising the Sum of Sixteen millions five hundred thousand Pounds, by Exchequer Bills, for the Service of the Year One thousand eight hundred and nineteen.	The whole act.
59 Geo. 3. c. 132	Treasury Bills (Ireland) Act 1819	An Act for raising the Sum of Two Millions British Currency, by Treasury Bills in Ireland, for the Service of the Year One thousand eight hundred and nineteen.	The whole act.
59 Geo. 3. c. 133	Appropriation Act 1819	An Act for applying certain Monies therein mentioned for the Service of the Year One thousand eight hundred and nineteen; and for further appropriating the Supplies granted in this Session of Parliament.	The whole act.
59 Geo. 3. c. 134	Church Building Act 1819	An Act to amend and render more effectual an Act passed in the last Session of Parliament, for building and promoting the building of additional Churches in populous Parishes	Sections One to Three. Section Six, the words " in the High Court of Chancery, and " and from " and all such " to end of that Section. Section Sixteen, the words " in the High Court of Chancery, and ". Section Twenty-one. Section Thirty-five. The rest of this Act so far as it confers power to enforce payment of any rate.
59 Geo. 3. c. 135	Highland Roads (Scotland) Act 1819	An Act the title of which begins with the words,—An Act to repeal Two Acts made in the Fifty-fourth and Fifty-sixth Years,—and ends with the words,—Regulation of Ferries in Scotland	Except Sections Twenty-five, Twenty-six, and Twenty-nine to Thirty-four.
59 Geo. 3. c. 138	Land Tax Act 1819	An Act the title of which begins with the words,—An Act for appointing Commissioners,—and ends with the words,—Land Tax to be raised in Great Britain for the Service of the Year One thousand seven hundred and ninety-eight.	The whole act.
60 Geo. 3. & 1 Geo. 4. c. 1	Unlawful Drilling Act 1819	An Act to prevent the Training of Persons to the Use of Arms, and to the Practice of Military Evolutions and Exercise	Section Five from "and the Venue" to "thereupon;" so far as relates to Ireland. Section Eight.
60 Geo. 3. & 1 Geo. 4. c. 2	Seizure of Arms Act 1819	An Act to authorize Justices of the Peace, in certain disturbed Counties to seize and detain Arms collected or kept for Purposes dangerous to the Public Peace; to continue in force until the Twenty-fifth Day of March One thousand eight hundred and twenty-two.	The whole act.
60 Geo. 3. & 1 Geo. 4. c. 3	Duties on Malt, etc. Act 1819	An Act for continuing to His Majesty certain Duties on Malt, Sugar, Tobacco, and Snuff, in Great Britain; and on Pensions, Offices, and Personal Estates in England; for the Service of the Year One thousand eight hundred and twenty.	The whole act.
60 Geo. 3. & 1 Geo. 4. c. 4	Pleading in Misdemeanor Act 1819	An Act to prevent Delay in the Administration of Justice in Cases of Misdemeanor	Sections Five to Seven.
60 Geo. 3. & 1 Geo. 4. c. 6	Seditious Meetings, etc. Act 1819	An Act for more effectually preventing Seditious Meetings and Assemblies; to continue in force until the End of the Session of Parliament next after Five Years from the passing of the Act.	The whole act.
60 Geo. 3. & 1 Geo. 4. c. 7	Parliamentary Elections Act 1819	An Act to amend an Act of the Forty-second Year of the Reign of His present Majesty, for regulating the Trial of controverted Elections or Returns of Members to serve in the United Parliament for Ireland.	Repealed so long as 31 & 32 Vict. c. 125. s. 50. continues in force.
60 Geo. 3. & 1 Geo. 4. c. 8	Criminal Libel Act 1819	An Act for the more effectual Prevention and Punishment of blasphemous and seditious Libels	Section Eight from " and the Venue " to " thereupon;" so far as relates to Ireland, and the whole Section so far as it relates to justices of the peace. Section Eleven.
60 Geo. 3. & 1 Geo. 4. c. 11	Parliamentary Elections (Ireland) Act 1820	An Act for the further Prevention of Forgery, and for making further Provision touching the Election of Members to serve in Parliament for Ireland	Sections One, Six, Eight, Twenty-eight to Thirty-three, Thirty-five, Thirty-seven to Forty, and Forty-one to end of Act.
60 Geo. 3. & 1 Geo. 4. c. 12	Expiring Laws Continuance Act 1820	An Act to continue, until the Twenty-fifth Day of June One thousand eight hundred and twenty, such Laws as may expire within a limited Period.	The whole act.
60 Geo. 3. & 1 Geo. 4. c. 13	Mutiny Act Continuance Act 1820	An Act for continuing an Act made in the last Session of Parliament, intituled An Act for punishing Mutiny and Desertion, and for the better Payment of the Army and their Quarters.	The whole act.
60 Geo. 3. & 1 Geo. 4. c. 14	Local Jurisdictions Act 1820	An Act to remedy certain Inconveniences in local and exclusive Jurisdictions.	The whole act.
1 Geo. 4. c. 1	Civil List Act 1820	An Act for the Support of His Majesty's Household, and of the Honour and Dignity of the Crown of the United Kingdom of Great Britain and Ireland.	The whole act.
1 Geo. 4. c. 2	South Sea Company Act 1820	An Act to enable His Majesty to be Governor of the South Sea Company.	The whole act.
1 Geo. 4. c. 3	Insolvent Debtors' Act 1820	An Act for the Removal of Doubts as to the Continuance of Three Acts for the Relief of Insolvent Debtors in England.	The whole act.
1 Geo. 4. c. 5	Transfer of Stock (Ireland) Act 1820	An Act to enable Courts of Equity in Ireland to compel a Transfer of Stock in Suits, without making the Governor and Company of the Bank of Ireland, or any Canal Company, Party thereto	Section Three.
1 Geo. 4. c. 6	Glebe Exchange Act 1820	An Act to amend and render more effectual an Act passed in the Fifty-fifth Year of His late Majesty's Reign, for enabling Spiritual Persons to exchange their Parsonage Houses or Glebe Lands, and for other Purposes therein mentioned	Section Two.
1 Geo. 4. c. 10	Supply Act 1820	An Act for applying certain Monies therein mentioned for the Service of the Year One thousand eight hundred and twenty.	The whole act.
1 Geo. 4. c. 11	Cape of Good Hope etc. Trade Act 1820	An Act to continue, until the Fifth Day of July One thousand eight hundred and twenty-five, an Act of the Fifty-seventh Year of His late Majesty, for regulating the Trade and Commerce to and from the Cape of Good Hope, and for regulating the Trade of the Island of Mauritius.	The whole act.
1 Geo. 4. c. 15	Flax etc. Manufacture (Great Britain) Act 1820	An Act to continue, until the Twenty-fifth Day of July One thousand eight hundred and twenty-one, an Act of the Twenty-eighth Year of His late Majesty, for the more effectual Encouragement of the Manufacture of Flax and Cotton in Great Britain.	The whole act.
1 Geo. 4. c. 16	Duties on Glass Act 1820	An Act to continue, until the Twenty-fifth Day of July One thousand eight hundred and twenty-one, an Act of the Fifty-eighth Year of His late Majesty, to continue certain Laws of Excise with regard to Crown Glass and Flint Glass, and to alter certain Laws with regard to Plate Glass.	The whole act.
1 Geo. 4. c. 18	Aliens Act 1820	An Act for further continuing, until the Twenty-fifth Day of March One thousand eight hundred and twenty-two, an Act of the Fifty-eighth Year of His late Majesty, for preventing Aliens from becoming naturalized, or being made or becoming Denizens, except in certain Cases.	The whole act.
1 Geo. 4. c. 19	Mutiny Act 1820	An Act for punishing Mutiny and Desertion; and for the better Payment of the Army and their Quarters.	The whole act.
1 Geo. 4. c. 20	Marine Mutiny Act 1820	An Act for the regulating of His Majesty's Royal Marine Forces while on Shore.	The whole act.
1 Geo. 4. c. 24	Peace Preservation Act 1820	An Act to amend and continue, until the Twentieth Day of June One thousand eight hundred and twenty-four, an Act of the Fifty-second Year of His late Majesty, for the more effectual Preservation of the Peace, by enforcing the Duties of Watching and Warding.	The whole act.
1 Geo. 4. c. 25	Manufacture of Sail Cloth Act 1820	An Act to repeal Part of an Act, made in the Ninth Year of the Reign of His late Majesty King George the Second, relative to the Manufacture of Sail Cloth.	The whole act.
1 Geo. 4. c. 27	Clerks of the Peace (Ireland) Act 1820	An Act to suspend until the next Session of Parliament the Tenure of the Office of Clerk of the Peace in Ireland	Sections Two, Three, Nine, and Ten.
1 Geo. 4. c. 31	Exchequer Bills Act 1820	An Act for raising the Sum of Twenty-nine Millions by Exchequer Bills, for the Service of the Year One thousand eight hundred and twenty.	The whole act.
1 Geo. 4. c. 33	Greenland Whale Fisheries Act 1820	An Act to amend and continue, until the Thirty-first Day of December One thousand eight hundred and twenty-three, several Laws relating to the Encouragement of the Greenland Whale Fisheries, to the allowing Vessels employed in the said Fisheries to complete their full Number of Men at certain Ports.	The whole act.
1 Geo. 4. c. 38	Quartering of Soldiers Act 1820	An Act for fixing the Rates of Subsistence to be paid to Innkeepers and others on quartering Soldiers.	The whole act.
1 Geo. 4. c. 39	Support of Commercial Credit (Ireland) Act 1820	An Act for the Assistance of Trade and Manufactures in Ireland, by authorizing the Advance of certain Sums for the Support of Commercial Credit there.	The whole act.
1 Geo. 4. c. 44	Consolidated Fund Act 1820	An Act to continue, until the Fifth Day of July One thousand eight hundred and twenty-one, an Act of the Fifty-ninth Year of His late Majesty, for rendering the growing Produce of the Consolidated Fund of the United Kingdom, arising in Great Britain, available for the Public Service.	The whole act.
1 Geo. 4. c. 46	Treasury Bills (Ireland) Act 1820	An Act for raising the Sum of One Million five hundred thousand pounds British Currency, by Treasury Bills in Ireland, for the Service of the Year One thousand eight hundred and twenty.	The whole act.
1 Geo. 4. c. 47	Arms (Ireland) Act 1820	An Act to revive and to continue for Two Years, and from thence until the End of the then next Session of Parliament, Two Acts made in the Forty-seventh and Fiftieth Years of the Reign of His late Majesty King George the Third, for the preventing improper Persons from having Arms in Ireland.	The whole act.
1 Geo. 4. c. 48	Yeomanry Corps (Ireland) Act 1820	An Act to revive and continue for Two Years, and from thence until the End of the then next Session of Parliament, the Laws relating to Yeomanry Corps in Ireland.	The whole act.
1 Geo. 4. c. 50	Removal of Slaves Act 1820	An Act to carry into Effect certain Licenses, permitting the Removal of Negro Slaves from the Bahama Islands and Bermuda to Demerary.	The whole act.
1 Geo. 4. c. 51	St. John's Newfoundland Act 1820	An Act to regulate the rebuilding of the Town of St. John's in Newfoundland, and for indemnifying Persons giving up Ground for that Purpose.	Repealed as to all Her Majesty's Dominions.
1 Geo. 4. c. 52	Importation Act 1820	An Act to continue, until the Thirty-first Day of December One thousand eight hundred and twenty-one, an Act made in the Fifty-sixth Year of His late Majesty, for permitting the Importation of Masts, Yards, Bowsprits, and Timber fit for Naval Purposes, from the British Colonies in North America.	The whole act.
1 Geo. 4. c. 53	Importation (No. 2) Act 1820	An Act to continue, until the Twenty-fifth Day of March One thousand eight hundred and twenty-one, so much of an Act of the Fifty-ninth Year of His late Majesty, as allows Swedes, Norway, and Baltic Wood to be imported free of Duty.	The whole act.
1 Geo. 4. c. 54	Bringing of Coals etc. to London etc. Act 1820	An Act to continue, until the First Day of August One thousand eight hundred and twenty-five, Two Acts of the Forty-fifth and Fiftieth Years of His late Majesty, allowing the bringing of Coals, Culm and Cinders to London and Westminster by Inland Navigation.	The whole act.
1 Geo. 4. c. 55	Kings' Bench Justices of Assize Act 1820	An Act for giving further Facilities to the Proceedings in the Court of King's Bench, and for giving certain Powers to Justices of Assize	Sections One to Three. Sections Five and Six, so far as they relate to the Justices of Chester.
1 Geo. 4. c. 57	Whipping Act 1820	An Act to repeal an Act passed in the Fifty-seventh Year of the Reign of His late Majesty King George the Third, intituled An Act for abolishing the Punishment of public Whipping on Female Offenders, and to make further Provision in lieu thereof	Section One.
1 Geo. 4. c. 59	Damaged Coffee etc. Act 1820	An Act the title of which begins with the words,—An Act to amend, revive, and continue,—and ends with the words,—not exceeding Eight Pounds Weight, without Permit.	The whole act.
1 Geo. 4. c. 60	Public Works Loans Act 1820	An Act to amend and continue Two Acts passed in the Fifty-seventh Year of His late Majesty King George the Third, for authorizing the Issue of Exchequer Bills and the Advance of Money for carrying on of Public Works and Fisheries, and Employment of the Poor; and to extend the Powers of the Commissioners for executing the said Acts in Great Britain	Sections One to Eighteen, and Twenty-five to end of Act.
1 Geo. 4. c. 62	Duties in New South Wales Act 1820	An Act the title of which begins with the words,—An Act to continue, until the First Day of January One thousand eight hundred and twenty-two,— and ends with the words,—to levy a Duty on Spirits made in the said Colony.	The whole act.
1 Geo. 4. c. 63	Bounty on Linens etc. Act 1820	An Act the title of which begins with the words,—An Act to continue,—and ends with the words,—on the Importation of Foreign Raw Linen Yarns made of Flax.	The whole act.
1 Geo. 4. c. 64	Sugar etc. Act 1820	An Act the title of which begins with the words,—An Act to continue,—and ends with the words,—on the Packages in which Sugar may be exported.	The whole act.
1 Geo. 4. c. 65	Accounts of Colonial Revenues Act 1820	An Act the title of which begins with the words,—An Act to continue,—and ends with the words,—Settlements of the Cape of Good Hope.	The whole act.
1 Geo. 4. c. 66	Police Magistrates Metropolitan Act 1820	An Act to continue, until the End of the next Session of Parliament, Two Acts of the Fifty-fourth Year of His late Majesty, for the more effectual Administration of the Office of a Justice of the Peace in and near the Metropolis, and for the Prevention of Depredations on the River Thames.	The whole act.
1 Geo. 4. c. 67	Duties on Coal etc. Act 1820	An Act to continue, until the First Day of August One thousand eight hundred and twenty-two, the Low Duties on Coals and Culm carried Coastwise to any Port within the Principality of Wales.	The whole act.
1 Geo. 4. c. 68	Exchequer Chamber (Ireland) Act 1820	An Act for the better Administration of Justice in the Court of Exchequer Chamber in Ireland	Section Eight.
1 Geo. 4. c. 71	Crown Lands Act 1820	An Act to enlarge the Time and Powers for carrying into Execution the Street Act into Execution; and to extend the Provisions of an Act, for ratifying an Agreement made with Lord Gage, and for the better Management and Improvement of the Land Revenues of the Crown.	The whole act.
1 Geo. 4. c. 74	Duties on Spirits etc. (Scotland) Act 1820	An Act to grant certain Duties, in Scotland, upon Wash and Spirits made from Corn or Grain, and upon Licences for making and keeping of Stills; and to consolidate and amend the Laws for the Distillation of such Spirits for Home Consumption, and for better preventing private Distillation in Scotland.	The whole act.
1 Geo. 4. c. 76	Sale of Spirits (England) Act 1820	An Act to repeal much of an Act of the Fifty-seventh Year of His late Majesty, as prohibits the Sale in England of any Spirits not being Spirits of Wine, British Brandy, British Gin, or Compounds.	The whole act.
1 Geo. 4. c. 77	Trade in Spirits Act 1820	An Act the title of which begins with the words,—An Act to continue,—and ends with the words,—Importation of Irish Spirits into Scotland.	The whole act.
1 Geo. 4. c. 79	Licensed Brewers (Ireland) Act 1820	An Act for making Allowances to licensed Brewers in Ireland, on account of the additional Duty on Malt used by them within a certain Period.	The whole act.
1 Geo. 4. c. 81	Public Works Loans (Ireland) Act 1820	An Act to amend several Acts made in the Fifty-seventh and Fifty-eighth Years of His late Majesty, for the Advance of Money for carrying on Public Works, and for other Purposes, so far as relates to Ireland.	The whole act.
1 Geo. 4. c. 86	Militia Pay (Great Britain) Act 1820	An Act the title of which begins with the words,—An Act to defray,—and ends with the words,—until the Twenty-fifth Day of March One thousand eight hundred and twenty-one.	The whole act.
1 Geo. 4. c. 92	Bank Notes Forgery (Scotland) Act 1820	An Act for the further Prevention of forging and counterfeiting of Bank Notes	Section Three.
1 Geo. 4. c. 93	Wages of Artificers etc. Act 1820	An Act to amend and render more effectual the Provisions of divers Acts, for securing to certain Artificers, Workmen, and Labourers, in such Acts mentioned, the due Payment of their Wages.	The whole act.
1 Geo. 4. c. 94	Census (Great Britain) Act 1820	An Act for taking an Account of the Population of Great Britain, and of the Increase or Diminution thereof.	The whole act.
1 Geo. 4. c. 95	Turnpike Road Trusts Act 1820	An Act for obtaining Returns from Turnpike Road Trusts of the Amount of their Revenues, and Expense of maintaining the same.	The whole act.
1 Geo. 4. c. 96	Militia Pay (Ireland) Act 1820	An Act for defraying, until the Twenty-fifth Day of June One thousand eight hundred and Twenty-one, the Charge of the Pay and Clothing of the Militia of Ireland; and for making Allowances to Officers and Quartermasters of the said Militia during Peace.	The whole act.
1 Geo. 4. c. 97	Insolvent Debtors (Ireland) Act 1820	An Act to revive and to continue, for One Year, the several Acts for the Relief of Insolvent Debtors in Ireland.	The whole act.
1 Geo. 4. c. 100	Militia (City of London) Act 1820	An Act for amending and reducing into one Act of Parliament, two several Acts passed in the Thirty-sixth and Thirty-ninth Years of His late Majesty King George the Third, for the better ordering and further regulating of the Militia of the City of London	Sections One and Three. Sections Two, Four, and Seven, so far as they relate to the property qualifications of officers. Sections Thirty-one to Thirty-three, and Forty-one.
1 Geo. 4. c. 104	Grant for Erection of Barracks Act 1820	An Act to enable His Majesty to defray the Charge of a certain Barrack by the Grant of an Annuity on the Consolidated Fund.	The whole act.
1 Geo. 4. c. 105	Aliens (No. 2) Act 1820	An Act to continue, for Two Years, an Act of the Fifty-sixth Year of His late Majesty, for establishing Regulations respecting Aliens arriving in or resident in this Kingdom, in certain Cases.	The whole act.
1 Geo. 4. c. 108	Apportionment Act 1820	An Act for enabling His Majesty to settle Annuities upon certain Branches of the Royal Family, in lieu of Annuities which have ceased upon the Demise of His late Majesty	Sections One and Two.
1 Geo. 4. c. 110	Exchequer Bills (No. 2) Act 1820	An Act to enable the Commissioners of His Majesty's Treasury to issue Exchequer Bills, on the Credit of such Aids or Supplies as have been or shall be granted by Parliament for the Service of the Year One thousand eight hundred and twenty.	The whole act.
1 Geo. 4. c. 111	Appropriation Act 1820	An Act for applying certain Monies therein mentioned for the Service of the Year One thousand eight hundred and twenty, and for further appropriating the Supplies granted in this Session of Parliament.	The whole act.
1 Geo. 4. c. 116	Capital Punishment (No. 2) Act 1820	An Act to repeal so much of the several Acts passed in the First and Second Years of the Reign of Philip and Mary, the Eighteenth of Charles the Second, the Ninth of George the First, and the Twelfth of George the Second, as inflicts Capital Punishment on certain Offences therein specified.	The whole act.
1 & 2 Geo. 4. c. 1	Provision for Queen Caroline Act 1821	An Act for enabling His Majesty to make Provision for Her Majesty the Queen.	The whole act.
1 & 2 Geo. 4. c. 3	Duties on Malt, etc. Act 1821	An Act for continuing to His Majesty certain Duties on Malt, Sugar, Tobacco and Snuff, Foreign Spirits, and Sweets, in Great Britain; and on Pensions, Offices, and Personal Estates in England; for the Service of the Year One thousand eight hundred and twenty-one.	The whole act.
1 & 2 Geo. 4. c. 4	Supply Act 1821	An Act for applying certain Monies therein mentioned for the Service of the Year One thousand eight hundred and twenty-one.	The whole act.
1 & 2 Geo. 4. c. 6	Transportation Act 1821	An Act to continue for Two Years from the passing thereof, to the End of the then next Session of Parliament, the several Acts for the Transportation of Offenders from Great Britain.	The whole act.
1 & 2 Geo. 4. c. 8	New South Wales Duties Act 1821	An Act the title of which begins with the words,—An Act to continue,—and ends with the words,—to levy a Duty on Spirits made in the said Colony.	The whole act.
1 & 2 Geo. 4. c. 9	Mutiny Act 1821	An Act for punishing Mutiny and Desertion; and for the better Payment of the Army and their Quarters.	The whole act.
1 & 2 Geo. 4. c. 10	Marine Mutiny Act 1821	An Act for the regulating of His Majesty's Royal Marine Forces while on Shore.	The whole act.
1 & 2 Geo. 4. c. 11	Silk Manufacture, etc. Act 1821	An Act to continue, until the Twenty-fifth Day of March One thousand eight hundred and twenty-four, the Bounties on the Exportation of certain Silk Manufactures, and the Duties on the Importation of Raw and Thrown Silk.	The whole act.
1 & 2 Geo. 4. c. 12	Flax, etc., Manufacture Act 1821	An Act to continue, until the Twenty-fifth Day of July One thousand eight hundred and twenty-two, an Act of the Twenty-third Year of His late Majesty, for the more effectual Encouragement of the Manufacture of Flax and Cotton in Great Britain.	The whole act.
1 & 2 Geo. 4. c. 13	Glass Duties Act 1821	An Act the title of which begins with the words,—An Act to continue,—and ends with the words,—and to alter certain Laws with regard to Flint Glass.	The whole act.
1 & 2 Geo. 4. c. 18	Witchcraft, etc. (Ireland) Act 1821	An Act to repeal an Act, made in the Parliament of Ireland in the Twenty-eighth Year of the Reign of Queen Elizabeth, against Witchcraft and Sorcery.	The whole act.
1 & 2 Geo. 4. c. 21	Disfranchisement of Grampound Act 1821	An Act the title of which begins with the words,—An Act to indemnify,—and ends with the words,—to send Two Burgesses to serve in Parliament in lieu thereof.	The whole act.
1 & 2 Geo. 4. c. 22	Beer Duties Act 1821	An Act for altering and amending the Laws of Excise for securing the Payment of the Duties on Beer and Ale brewed in Great Britain	Sections Four, Five, and Seven.
1 & 2 Geo. 4. c. 25	Quartering of Soldiers Act 1821	An Act for fixing the Rates of Subsistence to be paid to Innkeepers and others on quartering Soldiers.	The whole act.
1 & 2 Geo. 4. c. 28	West Africa Act 1821	An Act for abolishing the African Company, and transferring to and vesting in His Majesty all the Forts, Possessions, and Property now belonging to or held by them	Section Four.
1 & 2 Geo. 4. c. 31	Hereditary Revenues Act 1821	An Act for removing Doubts as to the Continuance of the Hereditary Revenue in Scotland	Section One, from " Provided always " to the end of that Section.
1 & 2 Geo. 4. c. 32	Indentures of Apprenticeship, etc. Act 1821	An Act for declaring valid certain Indentures of Apprenticeship, and Certificates of Settlements of poor Persons, in England.	The whole act.
1 & 2 Geo. 4. c. 33	Lunacy (Ireland) Act 1821	An Act to make more effectual Provision for the Establishment of Asylums for the Lunatic Poor, and for the Custody of Insane Persons charged with Offences, in Ireland	Section One from " from and after the expiration " to " been made; and that,". Section Two, the words " not more than One hundred and fifty;". Section Three. Section Four, from " and after any such Asylum " to the end of that Section. Section Seven. Section Sixteen from "and in all cases where " to the end of that Section.
1 & 2 Geo. 4. c. 36	Public Notaries (Ireland) Act 1821	An Act for the better Regulation of the Public Notaries in Ireland	Sections Four, Thirteen, and Fifteen.
1 & 2 Geo. 4. c. 38	Court of Session Act 1821	An Act for establishing Regulations respecting certain Parts of the Proceedings in the Courts of Session, and in the Court of Commissioners for Teinds, and respecting the Duties, Qualifications, and Emoluments of certain Clerks and other Officers of the said Courts	Section Two. Section Three from "and in all other cases when" to the end of that Section. Sections Five to Seven. Section Fourteen down to the words " payable quarterly; and ". Sections Seventeen, Nineteen to Twenty-one, Thirty-four, and Thirty-five.
1 & 2 Geo. 4. c. 39	Admiralty Courts (Scotland) Act 1821	An Act for the better Regulation of the Courts of Admiralty in Scotland, and of certain Proceedings in the Court of Session, connected therewith.	The whole act.
1 & 2 Geo. 4. c. 41	Steam Engine Furnaces Act 1821	An Act for giving greater Facility in the Prosecution and Abatement of Nuisances arising from Furnaces used in the working of Steam Engines	Section Four.
1 & 2 Geo. 4. c. 42	Militia Pay Act 1821	An Act the title of which begins with the words,—An Act to defray,—and ends with the words,—until the Twenty-fifth Day of March One thousand eight hundred and twenty-two.	The whole act.
1 & 2 Geo. 4. c. 43	Militia Pay (No. 2) Act 1821	An Act to defray, until the Twenty-fifth Day of June One thousand eight hundred and twenty-two, the Charge of the Pay and Clothing of the Militia of Ireland; and for making Allowances to Officers and Quartermasters of the said Militia during Peace.	The whole act.
1 & 2 Geo. 4. c. 44	House of Commons Disqualifications Act 1821	An Act to exclude Persons holding certain Judicial Offices in Ireland, from being Members of the House of Commons	Section Three.
1 & 2 Geo. 4. c. 47	Disfranchisement of Grampound (No. 2) Act 1821	An Act to exclude the Borough of Grampound, in the County of Cornwall, from sending Burgesses to serve in Parliament; and to enable the County of York to send Two additional Knights to serve in Parliament, in lieu thereof.	The whole act.
1 & 2 Geo. 4. c. 48	Solicitors (Ireland) Act 1821	An Act to amend the several Acts for the Regulation of Attornies and Solicitors	Section One. Section Four from "nor to any person who shall be bound " to the end of that Section.
1 & 2 Geo. 4. c. 52	Duchy of Lancaster Act 1821	An Act to improve the Land Revenues of the Crown, and of His Majesty's Duchy of Lancaster; and for making Provisions and Regulations for the better Management thereof	Except Sections Twelve and Thirteen, so far as they relate to the Duchy of Lancaster.
1 & 2 Geo. 4. c. 53	Common Law Procedure (Ireland) Act 1821	An Act to regulate the Proceedings in the Civil Side of the Court of King's Bench, and also in the Court of Common Pleas and in the Pleas of Common Law Side of the Court of Exchequer in Ireland	Section One from "and that no officer" to the end of that Section. Sections Two to Six. Section Seven from "one seal bearer and registrar of Attornies licences " in the Court of King's Bench " to " Common Pleas, who shall " be appointed to and shall hold their said offices as heretofore " respectively ". Section Eight. Section Ten from "and that for provision" to the end of that Section. Sections Eleven to Twenty, Twenty-two, Twenty-five, Twenty-six, Twenty-seven, Thirty-one to Thirty-five, Thirty-eight, Forty-one, Fifty-one to Fifty-seven, Fifty-nine, Sixty-five to Sixty-eight, Seventy-one and Seventy-two. Schedules A., B., and C. Schedule D. from "from and after the time" to the end of that Schedule.
1 & 2 Geo. 4. c. 54	Clerk of Assize (Ireland) Act 1821	An Act to regulate the Office of Clerk of Assize on Circuit, or Judge's Registrar in Ireland	Sections Eight to Ten.
1 & 2 Geo. 4. c. 56	Sale of Workhouses Act 1821	An Act to amend an Act, passed in the Twenty-second Year of His late Majesty, for the better Relief and Employment of the Poor.	The whole act.
1 & 2 Geo. 4. c. 58	Parliamentary Elections (Ireland) Act 1821	An Act to regulate the Expenses of returning Members to serve in Parliament for Ireland	Sections Four and Seven. Section Eight from " except " to the end of that Section. Schedule A. Items One and Four to Eight. Schedule B. Item One, the words " and for the first day's polling ". Item Two. Item Three from " and for the first day's polling " to the end of that Item; Item Four, the words " for the first day's polling "; Item Five; Item Six, the word " for the first day's polling ".
1 & 2 Geo. 4. c. 59	Insolvent Debtors (Ireland) Act 1821	An Act for the Relief of Insolvent Debtors in Ireland.	The whole act.
1 & 2 Geo. 4. c. 61	East India Company Act 1821	An Act to regulate the Appropriation of unclaimed Shares of Prize Money belonging to Soldiers or Seamen in the Service of the East India Company.	Repealed as to all Her Majesty's Dominions.
1 & 2 Geo. 4. c. 64	Vagrants Act 1821	An Act to amend the Laws now in force relating to Vagrants, until the First Day of September One thousand eight hundred and twenty-two.	The whole act.
1 & 2 Geo. 4. c. 66	British North America Act 1821	An Act for regulating the Fur Trade, and establishing a Criminal and Civil Jurisdiction within certain Parts of North America	Section Five.
1 & 2 Geo. 4. c. 68	Public Coal Yards, Dublin, etc. Act 1821	An Act to repeal so much of several Acts to prevent the excessive Price of Coals, as relates to Coal Yards established at the Expense of the Public in Dublin and Cork.	The whole act.
1 & 2 Geo. 4. c. 71	Exchequer Bills Act 1821	An Act for raising the Sum of Twenty-nine Millions by Exchequer Bills, for the Service of the Year One thousand eight hundred and twenty-one.	The whole act.
1 & 2 Geo. 4. c. 72	Bank of Ireland Act 1821	An Act to authorize an Advance to the Governor and Company of the Bank of Ireland, for Advancing the Sum of Five hundred thousand Pounds Irish Currency; and to empower the said Governor and Company to enlarge the Capital Stock or Fund of the said Bank to Three Millions	Sections One, Two, and Eight.
1 & 2 Geo. 4. c. 77	Gaol Fees Abolition (Ireland) Act 1821	An Act to abolish the Payment, by Prisoners in Ireland, of Gaol Fees, and all other Fees relating to the Commitment, Continuance, Trial, or Discharge of such Prisoners, and to prevent Abuses by Gaolers, Bailiffs, and other Officers	Sections Four to Six, except so far as they relate to the county of the city of Dublin.
1 & 2 Geo. 4. c. 78	Bills of Exchange Act 1821	An Act to regulate Acceptances of Bills of Exchange	Section Two.
1 & 2 Geo. 4. c. 79	White Herring Fishery (Scotland) Act 1821	An Act to repeal certain Bounties granted for the Encouragement of the Deep Sea British White Herring Fishery, and to make further Regulations relating to the said Fishery	Section Eight from " and that no bounty " to the end of that Section.
1 & 2 Geo. 4. c. 80	Treasury Bills (Ireland) Act 1821	An Act for raising the Sum of One Million British Currency, by Treasury Bills in Ireland, for the Service of the Year One thousand eight hundred and twenty-one.	The whole act.
1 & 2 Geo. 4. c. 81	Registry of Wool Act 1821	An Act to amend so much of an Act of the Twenty-eighth Year of His late Majesty as requires a Registry of Wool and Coastwise.	The whole act.
1 & 2 Geo. 4. c. 82	Drawback on Malt Act 1821	An Act for allowing to Distillers of Spirits from Grain for Home Consumption in Scotland, a Drawback of a Portion of the Duty on Malt used by them; and for the further Prevention of smuggling of Spirits on the Borders of Scotland and England.	The whole act.
1 & 2 Geo. 4. c. 83	Duty on Malt Act 1821	An Act for further reducing, until the Fifth Day of July One thousand eight hundred and twenty-two, the Duty on Malt made from Bear or Bigg only, for Home Consumption in Scotland.	The whole act.
1 & 2 Geo. 4. c. 90	Revenue (Ireland) Act 1821	An Act to appoint Commissioners for inquiring into the Collection and Management of the Revenue in Ireland, and the several Establishments connected therewith.	The whole act.
1 & 2 Geo. 4. c. 92	Exchange of Lands of Charities Act 1821	An Act to authorize the Exchange of Lands, Tenements, or Hereditaments, subject to Trusts for Charitable Purposes, for other Lands, Tenements, or Hereditaments.	The whole act.
1 & 2 Geo. 4. c. 95	Growing Produce of Consolidated Fund Act 1821	An Act to continue, until the Fifth Day of July One thousand eight hundred and twenty-two, an Act of the Fifty-ninth Year of His late Majesty, for rendering the growing Produce of the Consolidated Fund of the United Kingdom, arising in Great Britain, available for the Public Service.	The whole act.
1 & 2 Geo. 4. c. 100	Hops Act 1821	An Act for regulating the Exportation of Hops to Foreign Parts, and allowing a Drawback of the Excise Duty paid thereon.	The whole act.
1 & 2 Geo. 4. c. 101	Exportation Act 1821	An Act to extend to Ireland an Act of the last Session of Parliament, for granting an additional Bounty on the Exportation of certain Silk Manufactures, and to continue the same until the Fifth Day of July One thousand eight hundred and twenty-two.	The whole act.
1 & 2 Geo. 4. c. 106	Customs (No. 2) Act 1821	An Act the title of which begins with the words,—An Act to continue until the First Day of July,—and ends with the words,—Fifth Day of July One thousand eight hundred and twenty-four in Ireland.	The whole act.
1 & 2 Geo. 4. c. 111	Public Works Loans Act 1821	An Act to make further Provision in Great Britain for the Execution of several Acts for authorizing the Issue of Exchequer Bills for carrying on of Public Works and Fisheries, and Employment of the Poor, to extend the Time for the Payment of certain Advances under the said Acts.	The whole act.
1 & 2 Geo. 4. c. 112	Stamp Duties in Law Proceedings (Ireland) Act 1821	An Act to repeal, for the Term of Five Years, additional Stamp Duties on certain Proceedings in the Courts of Law, and to repeal certain other Stamp Duties, in Ireland	Sections One to Three, Thirteen, and Fourteen. Section Seventeen from " and that the proper officer " to " of such court ". Section Eighteen from " and that the proper officer " to " of such court ". Section Nineteen from " and " to " returned as aforesaid ". Sections Twenty-one and Twenty-two. Section Twenty-three from " shall neglect " to " required so ". Section Twenty-four. Section Twenty-seven from " and also of all increased salaries " to " this present session of Parliament ". Sections Twenty-eight to Thirty-one. The Schedule.
1 & 2 Geo. 4. c. 116	Customs (No. 3) Act 1821	An Act to empower the Commissioners of the Treasury to grant, until the End of the next Session of Parliament, a limited Provision to certain discharged Officers of the Customs.	The whole act.
1 & 2 Geo. 4. c. 117	Foundling Hospital, Dublin Act 1821	An Act to continue an Act of the Fiftieth Year of the Reign of His late Majesty King George the Third, for the better Management of the Foundling Hospital in Dublin.	The whole act.
1 & 2 Geo. 4. c. 118	Police Magistrates, Metropolitan Act 1821	An Act for the more effectual Administration of the Office of a Justice of the Peace in and near the Metropolis; and for the more effectual Prevention of Depredations on the River Thames and its Vicinity, for One Year.	The whole act.
1 & 2 Geo. 4. c. 119	Provisions for Duke of Clarence Act 1821	An Act for enabling His Majesty to make further Provision for His Royal Highness the Duke of Clarence.	The whole act.
1 & 2 Geo. 4. c. 122	Appropriation Act 1821	An Act for applying certain Monies therein mentioned for the Service of the Year One thousand eight hundred and twenty-one; and for further appropriating the Supplies granted in this Session of Parliament.	The whole act.
1 & 2 Geo. 4. c. 123	Land Tax Commissioners Act 1821	An Act the title of which begins with the words, An Act for appointing Commissioners,—and ends with the words,—for the Service of the Year One thousand seven hundred and ninety-eight.	The whole act.
3 Geo. 4. c. 1	Suppression of Insurrections (Ireland) Act 1822	An Act to suppress Insurrections and prevent Disturbance of the Public Peace in Ireland, until the First Day of August One thousand eight hundred and twenty-two.	The whole act.
3 Geo. 4. c. 2	Habeas Corpus Suspension (Ireland) Act 1822	An Act the title of which begins with the words,—An Act to empower the Lord Lieutenant,—and ends with the words,—His Majesty's Person and Government.	The whole act.
3 Geo. 4. c. 3	Indemnity for Seizing Arms, etc. (Ireland) Act 1822	An Act for indemnifying such Persons as have seized or detained any Arms or Gunpowder in Ireland, since the First Day of November One thousand eight hundred and twenty-one, for the Preservation of the Public Peace.	The whole act.
3 Geo. 4. c. 4	Arms (Ireland) Act 1822	An Act to continue the Importation of Arms, Gunpowder, and Ammunition into Ireland, and the making, removing, selling, and keeping of Arms, Prevention of private Distillation in Scotland, until the Tenth Day of November One thousand eight hundred and twenty-four	
3 Geo. 4. c. 6	Duties on Sugar, etc. Act 1822	An Act the title of which begins with the words,—An Act for continuing,—and ends with the words,—One thousand eight hundred and twenty-two.	The whole act.
3 Geo. 4. c. 7	Supply Act 1822	An Act for applying certain Monies therein mentioned for the Service of the Year One thousand eight hundred and twenty-two.	The whole act.
3 Geo. 4. c. 8	Exchequer Bills Act 1822	An Act for raising the Sum of Twenty Millions by Exchequer Bills, for the Service of the Year One thousand eight hundred and twenty-two.	The whole act.
3 Geo. 4. c. 11	Marine Mutiny Act 1822	An Act for the regulating of His Majesty's Royal Marine Forces while on Shore.	The whole act.
3 Geo. 4. c. 13	Mutiny Act 1822	An Act for punishing Mutiny and Desertion; and for the better Payment of the Army and their Quarters.	The whole act.
3 Geo. 4. c. 14	Land Tax Commissioners Act 1822	An Act for rectifying Mistakes in the Names of the Land Tax Commissioners, and for appointing additional Commissioners, and indemnifying such Persons as have acted without due authority in Execution of the Acts therein mentioned.	The whole act.
3 Geo. 4. c. 15	Aliens Act 1822	An Act for further continuing, until the Twenty-fifth Day of March One thousand eight hundred and twenty-three, an Act of the Fifty-eighth Year of His late Majesty, for preventing Aliens from becoming naturalized, or being made or becoming Denizens except in certain Cases.	The whole act.
3 Geo. 4. c. 16	Solicitors (Ireland) Act 1822	An Act to amend an Act, made in the last Session of Parliament, for amending the several Acts for the Regulation of Attornies and Solicitors	From "And that so much" to the end of the Act.
3 Geo. 4. c. 18	Duties on Malt Act 1822	An Act to repeal the Excise Duty on Malt charged by an Act made in the Second Year of His present Majesty, to allow the Duty on Malt in Stock, and to make Regulations for better securing the Duties on Malt	Sections One to Eleven, Seventeen, and Twenty.
3 Geo. 4. c. 20	Quartering of Soldiers Act 1822	An Act for fixing the Rates of Subsistence to be paid to Innkeepers and others on quartering Soldiers.	The whole act.
3 Geo. 4. c. 21	Fever Hospitals (Ireland) Act 1822	An Act to amend an Act passed in the Fifty-eighth Year of the Reign of His late Majesty King George the Third, for establishing Fever Hospitals, and for making other Regulations for Relief of the suffering Poor, and for preventing the Increase of infectious Fevers in Ireland.	The whole act.
3 Geo. 4. c. 22	Support of Commercial Credit (Ireland) Act 1822	An Act to amend an Act, passed in the First Year of His present Majesty's Reign, for the Assistance of Trade and Manufactures in Ireland, by securing the Advance of certain Sums for the Support of Commercial Credit there.	The whole act.
3 Geo. 4. c. 27	Excise Licences Act 1822	An Act to amend and continue, until the Fifth Day of July One thousand eight hundred and twenty-three, so much of an Act made in the Fifty-fifth Year of His late Majesty, as relates to additional Duties of Excise, in Great Britain, on Malt and Spirits.	The whole act.
3 Geo. 4. c. 29	Payment of Creditors (Scotland) Act 1822	An Act the title of which begins with the words—An Act to continue,—and ends with the words,—equal and expeditious in Scotland.	The whole act.
3 Geo. 4. c. 30	Duty on Beer or Bigg Malt Act 1822	An Act for reducing, during the Continuance of the present Duty on Malt, the Duty on Malt made from Bear or Bigg only, in Scotland	Sections One, Fifteen, and Sixteen.
3 Geo. 4. c. 31	Duties on Malt, etc. Act 1822	An Act to grant Countervailing Duties, and to allow equivalent Drawbacks on Malt, Beer, and Spirits, imported and exported between Great Britain and Ireland.	The whole act.
3 Geo. 4. c. 33	Riotous Assemblies (Scotland) Act 1822	An Act the title of which begins with the words,—An Act for altering and amending several Acts,—and ends with the words,—unlawful and malicious Offenders	Section Seventeen.
3 Geo. 4. c. 34	Employment of the Poor (Ireland) Act 1822	An Act for the Employment of the Poor in certain Districts in Ireland.	The whole act.
3 Geo. 4. c. 36	Duty on Malt (Ireland) Act 1822	An Act to reduce the Duty of Excise on Malt made in Ireland, and certain Drawbacks in respect thereof.	The whole act.
3 Geo. 4. c. 37	Inquiry into Collection, etc., of Revenue Act 1822	An Act to extend the Powers of the Commissioners appointed by an Act, passed in the last Session of Parliament, for inquiring into the Collection and Management of the Revenue in Ireland.	The whole act.
3 Geo. 4. c. 41	Repeal of Acts Concerning Importation Act 1822	An Act to repeal divers ancient Statutes and Parts of Statutes, so far as they relate to the Prohibition of the Exportation of Goods and Merchandise from and to Foreign Countries.	The whole act.
3 Geo. 4. c. 42	Repeal of Acts Concerning Importation (No. 2) Act 1822	An Act to repeal several Acts and Parts of Acts, relating to the Importation of Goods and Merchandise.	The whole act.
3 Geo. 4. c. 46	Levy of Fines Act 1822	An Act for the more effectual Recovery of Penalties and Forfeitures and Recognizances estreated	Sections One and Twelve.
3 Geo. 4. c. 48	Tonnage Duties Act 1822	An Act to repeal certain Tonnage Duties of Customs on Ships or Vessels.	The whole act.
3 Geo. 4. c. 52	Illicit Distillation (Scotland) Act 1822	An Act to grant certain Duties, in Scotland, upon Wash and Spirits made from Corn or Grain, and upon Licences for making and keeping of Stills; and to regulate the Distillation of such Spirits for Home Consumption; and for better preventing private Distillation in Scotland, until the Tenth Day of November One thousand eight hundred and twenty-four	Sections One to One hundred and seven. Section One hundred and ten, so far as it relates to licences to makers of stills . Sections One hundred and twenty-three, One hundred and twenty-seven, and One hundred and twenty-eight.
3 Geo. 4. c. 53	Manufacture of Scorched Corn, etc. Act 1822	An Act to regulate the Manufacture and Sale of scorched or roasted Corn, Peas, Beans, or Parsnips, and of Cocoa Paste, Broma, and other Mixtures of Cocoa.	The whole act.
3 Geo. 4. c. 54	Duties on Fire Hearths, etc. (Ireland) Act 1822	An Act to repeal the Rates, Duties, and Taxes payable in respect of Fire Hearths and Windows in Ireland; and to exempt certain Persons from the Tax on Dogs.	The whole act.
3 Geo. 4. c. 56	Offices in the Exchequer (Ireland) Act 1822	An Act to provide for the more effectual Regulation of certain Offices relating to the Receipt of His Majesty's Exchequer in Ireland.	The whole act.
3 Geo. 4. c. 59	Duties on Coals, etc. Act 1822	An Act to continue, until the Fifth Day of July One thousand eight hundred and twenty-four, the Low Duties on Coals and Culm carried Coastwise to any Port within the Principality of Wales.	The whole act.
3 Geo. 4. c. 62	Fees in Office of Lord Register of Scotland Act 1822	An Act for regulating the Fees chargeable in His Majesty's General Register House at Edinburgh, and for completing the buildings necessary for keeping the Public Records of Scotland therein	Section One, the words "The Lord Chief Baron of the Court of " Exchequer in Scotland and the Lord Chief Commissioner of the " Jury Court ". Sections Three to Five.
3 Geo. 4. c. 63	Crown Lands (Ireland) Act 1822	An Act to authorize the Sale of Quit Rents and other Rents, and the Sale and Demise of Lands, Tenements, and Hereditaments, the Property of His Majesty in Right of the Crown in Ireland	Except Sections Twelve and Thirteen.
3 Geo. 4. c. 65	Growing Produce of Consolidated Fund Act 1822	An Act to continue, until the Fifth Day of July One thousand eight hundred and twenty-three, an Act of the Fifty-ninth Year of His late Majesty, for rendering the growing Produce of the Consolidated Fund of the United Kingdom, arising in Great Britain, available for the Public Service.	The whole act.
3 Geo. 4. c. 67	Excise Licences (No. 2) Act 1822	An Act to repeal so much of the Excise Licences Act of the present Session as regards the carrying on of Trade in more than One Place.	The whole act.
3 Geo. 4. c. 69	Fees in Common Law Courts Act 1822	An Act to enable the Judges of the several Courts of Record at Westminster, to make Regulations respecting the Fees of the Officers, Clerks, and Ministers of the said Courts	Except Section Three.
3 Geo. 4. c. 72	Church Building Act 1822	An Act to amend and render more effectual Two Acts, passed in the Fifty-eighth and Fifty-ninth Years of His late Majesty, for building and promoting the building of additional Churches in populous Parishes	Sections Five, Six, Twenty-one, Thirty, and Thirty-eight. The rest of this Act, so far as it confers power to enforce payment of any rate.
3 Geo. 4. c. 75	Confirmation of Marriages Act 1822	An Act to amend certain Provisions of the Twenty-sixth of George the Second, for the better preventing of Clandestine Marriages	Section One.
3 Geo. 4. c. 76	Drawback on Malt for Distilling Act 1822	An Act to amend an Act of the last Session of Parliament, for allowing to Distillers in Scotland a Drawback of a Portion of the Duty on Malt used by them.	The whole act.
3 Geo. 4. c. 77	Licensing of Ale Houses Act 1822	An Act for amending the Laws for regulating the Manner of licensing Alehouses in that Part of the United Kingdom called England, and for the more effectually preventing Disorders therein.	The whole act.
3 Geo. 4. c. 78	Leases of Lands of Duchy of Cornwall Act 1822	An Act to enable His Majesty to make Leases, Copies and Grants of Offices, Lands and Hereditaments, Parcel of the Duchy of Cornwall, or annexed to the same.	The whole act.
3 Geo. 4. c. 79	Endowed Schools (Ireland) Act 1822	An Act to amend an Act of the Fifty-third Year of the Reign of His late Majesty, for the Appointment of Commissioners for the Regulation of the several Endowed Schools of Ireland.	Section Two. Section Three. Section Six to "repealed; and ". Sections Ten and Thirteen.
3 Geo. 4. c. 80	Suppression of Insurrections (Ireland) (No. 2) Act 1822	An Act to continue, until the First Day of August One thousand eight hundred and twenty-three, an Act made in the present Session of Parliament, for suppressing Insurrections and preventing Disturbances of the Public Peace in Ireland.	The whole act.
3 Geo. 4. c. 82	Duties on Salt Act 1822	An Act for reducing the Duties of Excise payable upon Salt in England, and repealing the Duties upon Salt (not being Foreign Salt), and reducing the Duties upon Foreign Salt payable in Scotland.	The whole act.
3 Geo. 4. c. 83	Duties and Drawbacks on Leather Act 1822	An Act to repeal the additional Duties and Drawbacks on Leather, granted and allowed by Two Acts of His late Majesty, and to grant other Drawbacks in lieu thereof, and to secure the Duties on Leather.	The whole act.
3 Geo. 4. c. 84	Advances for Relief of Distress (Ireland) Act 1822	An Act to authorize certain temporary Advances of Money, for the Relief of the Distresses existing in Ireland.	The whole act.
3 Geo. 4. c. 86	Public Works Loans Act 1822	An Act to amend Two Acts of the Fifty-seventh Year of His late Majesty, and the First Year of His present Majesty, relative to the Purchase of the City of London's Rights in the Irish Society, and the Improvement of the Town of Londonderry and Coleraine; and to authorize a further Issue of Exchequer Bills for the Purposes of the said Acts.	Sections One to Eight, inclusive. Section Nine to "extended by this Act; and ". Sections Eleven to Fourteen, Twenty-six, Thirty-three to Thirty-eight, Forty, Forty-one, Forty-three to Forty-seven, Fifty, and Fifty-five to Fifty-seven.
3 Geo. 4. c. 87	Court of Exchequer Act 1822	An Act to enable His Majesty's Court of Exchequer to sit, and the Lord Chief Baron or any other Baron of the said Court to try Middlesex Issues, and for other Purposes relating to the Court of Exchequer is commonly kept in the County of Middlesex.	The whole act.
3 Geo. 4. c. 88	Land and Assessed Taxes Act 1822	An Act to amend the Laws relating to the Land and Assessed Taxes, and to regulate the Appointment of Receivers General in England and Wales.	Section One. Section Two, No. 1, Rules and Regulations touching the Office of Receiver General, with the exception of the seventh rule. Section Seven to end of Act.
3 Geo. 4. c. 90	Exportation Act 1822	An Act to revive and continue, until the Fifth Day of July One thousand eight hundred and twenty-three, certain additional Bounties on the Exportation of certain Silk Manufactures of Great Britain and Ireland.	The whole act.
3 Geo. 4. c. 94	Duties on Malt, etc. (No. 2) Act 1822	An Act to provide for the Collection and Payment of the Countervailing Duties and Drawbacks granted by an Act of this present Session, on Malt and other Articles imported and exported between Great Britain and Ireland.	The whole act.
3 Geo. 4. c. 97	Aliens (No. 2) Act 1822	An Act to continue for Two Years an Act of the Fifty-sixth Year of His late Majesty, for establishing Regulations respecting Aliens arriving in or resident in this Kingdom, in certain Cases.	The whole act.
3 Geo. 4. c. 99	Customs Act 1822	An Act to continue, until the Fifth Day of January One thousand eight hundred and twenty-five, the Duties of Customs payable on British Salt imported into Ireland; to repeal the Duties on Foreign Salt imported into Ireland; and to grant other Duties in lieu thereof.	The whole act.
3 Geo. 4. c. 104	Bounty to Certain Vessels Act 1822	An Act the title of which begins with the words,—An Act to continue,—and ends with the words,—allowing the said Bounty.	The whole act.
3 Geo. 4. c. 106	Duties on Sugar Act 1822	An Act to continue for One Year so much of an Act of the last Session of Parliament, as increases the Duties payable on Sugar imported from the East Indies.	The whole act.
3 Geo. 4. c. 111	Exportation (No. 2) Act 1822	An Act to allow, until the Tenth Day of November One thousand eight hundred and twenty-four, the Exportation of Spirits distilled from Corn for Home Consumption in Scotland, to Parts beyond Seas, without Payment of the Duty of Excise chargeable thereon.	The whole act.
3 Geo. 4. c. 112	Public Works Loans (Ireland) Act 1822	An Act to authorize the further Advance of Money out of the Consolidated Fund, for the Completion of Works of a Public Nature, and for the Encouragement of the Fisheries in Ireland.	The whole act.
3 Geo. 4. c. 114	Hard Labour Act 1822	An Act to provide for the more effectual Punishment of certain Offences, by Imprisonment with hard Labour	From " having entered " to " any offensive weapon,".
3 Geo. 4. c. 118	Support of Commercial Credit (Ireland) (No. 2) Act 1822	An Act to amend an Act made in this present Session of Parliament, for amending an Act made in the First Year of His present Majesty's Reign, for the Assistance of Trade and Manufactures in Ireland, by authorising the Advance of certain Sums for the Support of Commercial Credit there.	The whole act.
3 Geo. 4. c. 120	Militia Pay Act 1822	An Act the title of which begins with the words,—An Act to defray,—and ends with the words,—One thousand eight hundred and twenty-three.	The whole act.
3 Geo. 4. c. 121	Militia Pay (Ireland) Act 1822	An Act to defray, until the Twenty-fifth Day of June One thousand eight hundred and twenty-three, the Charge of the Pay and Clothing of the Militia of Ireland; and for making Allowances to Officers and Quartermasters of the said Militia during Peace.	The whole act.
3 Geo. 4. c. 122	Exchequer Bills (No. 2) Act 1822	An Act for raising the Sum of Sixteen millions five hundred thousand Pounds, by Exchequer Bills, for the Service of the Year One thousand eight hundred and twenty-two.	The whole act.
3 Geo. 4. c. 124	Insolvent Debtors (Ireland) Act 1822	An Act to amend an Act passed in the First and Second Years of His Majesty's Reign, for the Relief of Insolvent Debtors in Ireland.	The whole act.
3 Geo. 4. c. 126	Turnpike Roads Act 1822	An Act to amend the general Laws now in being for regulating Turnpike Roads in that Part of Great Britain called England	Sections One to Three, Seventeen, Eighteen, Thirty-four, Thirty-seven, Fifty-nine, Seventy-one, Ninety to Ninety-six, One hundred and five, One hundred and nine, and One hundred and twenty-eight. Section One hundred and thirty-seven from " in " to " such parish, township, or place ". The Forms in Schedules numbered Four, Five, Nine to Thirteen, Twenty-three, and Twenty-four.
3 Geo. 4. c. 127	Appropriation Act 1822	An Act for applying certain Monies therein mentioned for the Service of the Year One thousand eight hundred and twenty-two, and for further appropriating the Supplies granted in this Session of Parliament.	The whole act.
4 Geo. 4. c. 3	Duties on Sugar, etc. Act 1823	An Act the title of which begins with the words,—An Act for continuing,— and ends with the words,—One thousand eight hundred and twenty-three.	The whole act.
4 Geo. 4. c. 4	Exchequer Bills Act 1823	An Act for raising the Sum of Twenty Millions by Exchequer Bills for the Service of the Year One thousand eight hundred and twenty-three.	The whole act.
4 Geo. 4. c. 5	Confirmation of Certain Marriages Act 1823	An Act to render valid certain Orders in Council	Section Two.
4 Geo. 4. c. 6	Supply Act 1823	An Act for applying certain Monies therein mentioned for the Service of the Year One thousand eight hundred and twenty-three.	The whole act.
4 Geo. 4. c. 7	Chancellor of the Exchequer (Ireland) Act 1823	An Act to regulate the Appointment and Swearing into Office of the Chancellor of the Exchequer of Ireland	Section One from " and that whenever " to the end of that Section. Section Two.
4 Geo. 4. c. 8	Payment of Creditors (Scotland) Act 1823	An Act the title of which begins with the words,—An Act to continue,—and ends with the words,—equal and expeditious in Scotland.	The whole act.
4 Geo. 4. c. 9	Duties on Servants, etc. (Ireland) Act 1823	An Act to repeal the Rates, Duties, and Taxes payable in respect of Male Servants, Horses, Carriages, and Dogs, in Ireland.	The whole act.
4 Geo. 4. c. 11	Assessed Taxes Act 1823	An Act for repealing certain of the Duties of Assessed Taxes; for reducing certain other of the said Duties; and for relieving Persons who have compounded for the same.	The whole act.
4 Geo. 4. c. 12	Marine Mutiny Act 1823	An Act for the regulating of His Majesty's Royal Marine Forces while on Shore.	The whole act.
4 Geo. 4. c. 13	Mutiny Act 1823	An Act for punishing Mutiny and Desertion; and for the better Payment of the Army and their Quarters.	The whole act.
4 Geo. 4. c. 14	Arms (Ireland) Act 1823	An Act to continue for Five Years, and from thence until the End of the then next Session of Parliament, Two Acts made in the Forty-seventh and Fiftieth Years of the Reign of His late Majesty King George the Third, for the preventing improper Persons from having Arms in Ireland.	The whole act.
4 Geo. 4. c. 15	Yeomanry Corps (Ireland) Act 1823	An Act to continue for Five Years, and from thence until the End of the then next Session of Parliament, the Laws relating to Yeomanry Corps in Ireland.	The whole act.
4 Geo. 4. c. 16	Turnpike Roads (Tolls on Lime) Act 1823	An Act to explain so much of the General Turnpike Act, as relates to the Toll payable on Carriages laden with Lime for the Improvement of Land	Sections Two and Three.
4 Geo. 4. c. 19	National Debt Reduction Act 1823	An Act for further regulating the Reduction of the National Debt	Sections One to Seven. Section Eight from "the Sum of One hundred and thirty-seven thousand " to " and also to cause ". Sections Nine, Ten, and Fourteen.
4 Geo. 4. c. 20	Quartering of Soldiers Act 1823	An Act for fixing the Rates of Subsistence to be paid to Innkeepers and others on quartering Soldiers.	The whole act.
4 Geo. 4. c. 21	Supply (No. 2) Act 1823	An Act for granting and applying certain Sums of Money for the Service of the Year One thousand eight hundred and twenty-three.	The whole act.
4 Geo. 4. c. 28	Militia (Ireland) Act 1823	An Act for the more speedy Reduction of the Number of Serjeants, Corporals, and Drummers in the Militia of Ireland, when not in actual Service.	The whole act.
4 Geo. 4. c. 30	Countervening Duties of Excise Act 1823	An Act to regulate the Importation and Exportation of certain Articles subject to Duties of Excise, and certain other Articles the Produce or Manufacture of Great Britain and Ireland respectively, into and from either Country from and to the other.	The whole act.
4 Geo. 4. c. 31	Cursing and Swearing Act 1823	An Act to amend an Act passed in the Nineteenth Year of the Reign of His late Majesty King George the Second, intituled An Act more effectually to prevent profane Cursing and Swearing.	The whole act.
4 Geo. 4. c. 33	County Treasurers (Ireland) Act 1823	An Act to make more effectual Regulations for the Election, and to secure the Performance of the Duties, of County Treasurers in Ireland	Sections Eleven, Sixteen to Eighteen, and the Schedules. And, except as to the Cities of Dublin, Cork, and Limerick, Sections One to Six, Twelve, and Fourteen.
4 Geo. 4. c. 36	Joint Tenancy (Ireland) Act 1823	An Act to discourage the granting of Leases in Joint Tenancy in Ireland	Section One.
4 Geo. 4. c. 37	Levy of Fines Act 1823	An Act to amend an Act for the more speedy Return and Levying of Fines, Penalties, and Forfeitures, and Recognizances estreated	Section Two.
4 Geo. 4. c. 38	Compensation for Law Offices (Ireland) Act 1823	An Act for settling the Compensation to the Holders of certain Offices in the Courts of Law in Ireland, abolished under an Act passed in the First and Second Years of the Reign of His present Majesty, for regulating the same.	The whole act.
4 Geo. 4. c. 40	Linen and Hempen Manufactures (Scotland) Act 1823	An Act to amend several Acts for the Regulation of the Linen and Hempen Manufactures in Scotland	Sections One, Two, and Four.
4 Geo. 4. c. 42	Support of Commercial Credit (Ireland) Act 1823	An Act to amend an Act for the Assistance of Trade and Manufactures, and the Support of Commercial Credit, in Ireland.	The whole act.
4 Geo. 4. c. 43	Salaries of County Officers (Ireland) Act 1823	An Act to regulate the Amount of Presentments by Grand Juries, for Payment of the Public Officers of the several Counties in Ireland.	The whole act.
4 Geo. 4. c. 46	Capital Punishments, etc. Act 1823	An Act the title of which begins with the words,—An Act for repealing the Corporal Punishments,—and ends with the words,—an Act of the Twenty-eighth Year of the same Reign	Section One, the words "Court of Great Sessions or" and by the Act of the Third Year of King George the Third therein recited.
4 Geo. 4. c. 47	Male Convicts Act 1823	An Act for authorizing the Employment at Labour, in the Colonies, of Male Convicts under Sentence of Transportation.	The whole act.
4 Geo. 4. c. 51	Duties on Beer, etc. Act 1823	An Act to encourage the Consumption of Beer; and to amend the Laws for securing the Excise Duties thereon.	The whole act.
4 Geo. 4. c. 53	Benefit of Clergy, etc. Act 1823	An Act for extending the Benefit of Clergy to several Larcenies therein mentioned.	The whole act.
4 Geo. 4. c. 55	Parliamentary Elections (Ireland) Act 1823	An Act to consolidate and amend the several Acts now in force, so far as the same relate to the Election and Return of Members to serve in Parliament, for Counties of Cities and Counties of Towns in Ireland	Sections One to Twenty-three, Twenty-nine to Thirty-two, Seventy-eight, Eighty, and Eighty-three to Eighty-five. Section Eighty-seven, from " and provided " to " authority of this Act."
4 Geo. 4. c. 56	Military Roads, etc. (Scotland) Act 1823	An Act for maintaining in Repair the Military and Parliamentary Roads and Bridges in the Highlands of Scotland, and also certain Ferry Piers and Shipping-Quays erected by the Commissioners for Highland Roads and Bridges.	The whole act.
4 Geo. 4. c. 57	Duties, etc., on Barilla (No. 2) Act 1823	An Act to defer the Commencement of the Duties and Drawbacks on Berlin, under an Act of the present Session of Parliament.	The whole act.
4 Geo. 4. c. 58	Insurrections, etc. (Ireland) Act 1823	An Act to continue, until the First Day of August One thousand eight hundred and twenty-four, an Act, made in the last Session of Parliament, for suppressing Insurrections and preventing Disturbance of the Public Peace in Ireland.	The whole act.
4 Geo. 4. c. 59	Militia Pay Act 1823	An Act the title of which begins with the words,—An Act to defray,—and ends with the words,—One thousand eight hundred and twenty-four.	The whole act.
4 Geo. 4. c. 60	Lotteries Act 1823	An Act for granting to His Majesty a Sum of Money to be raised by Lotteries	Except Section Nineteen, down to the words " ceased and determined." Section Thirty-six, so far as Section Forty-one directs that the words " authorized as aforesaid," and from " such Person " to " as aforesaid," shall be inserted in Sections Fifty-nine to Sixty-two, Sixty-seven and Sixty-eight.
4 Geo. 4. c. 61	Court of Chancery (Ireland) Act 1823	An Act for the better Administration of Justice in the Court of Chancery in Ireland	Sections One to Four. Section Five, from "other than the said Deputy Clerk" to "Possessor of the Office of Clerk of the Crown and Hanaper". Sections Nine to Eleven. Section Twelve, to "Court of Chancery in Ireland." Sections Twenty to Twenty-three. Section Twenty-four, the words "the Clerk and," the words "and the number of skins which each bill shall contain;" and from "and the said deputy" to "provided for him". Sections Twenty-five, Twenty-eight, Thirty-one, Thirty-two, Thirty-five, and Thirty-six. Section Forty, from "and that the said Chief and all other Clerks" to "and shall hold the said office during their good behaviour respectively;" and from "namely, by" to "in the said Office of Registrar." Section Forty-four, to "taken before them." Sections Fifty-one to Fifty-four, Sixty to Seventy-one, Seventy-three, and Seventy-four. The tables of fees in the Schedule.
4 Geo. 4. c. 63	Advances for Building Gaols, etc. (England) Act 1823	An Act to authorize the Advance of Money by the Commissioners under several Acts for the Issue of Exchequer Bills for Public Works, for the building, rebuilding, enlarging, or repairing of Gaols in England.	The whole act.
4 Geo. 4. c. 68	Land Tax Commissioners Act 1823	An Act for rectifying Mistakes in the Names of the Land Tax Commissioners, and for appointing additional Commissioners, and indemnifying such Persons as have acted without due Authority in Execution of the Acts therein recited.	The whole act.
4 Geo. 4. c. 71	Indian Bishops and Courts Act 1823	An Act for defraying the Charge of Retiring Pay, Pensions, and other Expenses of that Nature, of His Majesty's Forces serving in India; for establishing the Pensions of the Bishops, Archdeacons, and Judges; for regulating Ordinations; and for establishing a Court of Judicature at Bombay	Sections One, Two, Eight to Ten, Fourteen to Sixteen, and Eighteen. Repealed as to all Her Majesty's Dominions.
4 Geo. 4. c. 72	Customs Duties (Ireland) Act 1823	An Act to repeal the several Duties and Drawbacks of Customs chargeable and allowable in Ireland on the Importation and Exportation of certain Foreign and Colonial Goods, Wares, and Merchandise, and to grant other Duties and Drawbacks in lieu thereof, equal to the Duties and Drawbacks chargeable and allowable thereon in Great Britain.	The whole act.
4 Geo. 4. c. 73	Malicious Injuries to Property (Ireland) Act 1823	An Act to facilitate the Recovery of Damages for malicious Injuries to Property in Ireland.	The whole act.
4 Geo. 4. c. 76	Marriage Act 1823	An Act for amending the Laws respecting the Solemnization of Marriages in England	Section One.
4 Geo. 4. c. 77	Importation, etc., in Foreign Vessels Act 1823	An Act to authorize His Majesty, under certain Circumstances, to regulate the Duties and Drawbacks on Goods imported or exported in Foreign Vessels; and to exempt certain Foreign Vessels from Pilotage.	The whole act.
4 Geo. 4. c. 80	Lascars Act 1823	An Act the title of which begins with the words,—An Act to consolidate and amend,—and ends with the words,—so far as it relates to England	Except Sections Twenty-five to Thirty-four. Repealed as to all Her Majesty's Dominions.
4 Geo. 4. c. 82	Temporary Removal of Convicts Act 1823	An Act to authorize for One Year, and from thence to the End of the then next Session of Parliament, the Removal of Convicts from the General Penitentiary.	The whole act.
4 Geo. 4. c. 85	Process in Courts of Law, etc. (Scotland) Act 1823	An Act for empowering Commissioners, to be appointed by His Majesty, to inquire into the Forms of Process in the Courts of Law in Scotland, and the Course of Appeals from the Court of Sessions to the House of Lords.	The whole act.
4 Geo. 4. c. 87	Unlawful Oaths (Ireland) Act 1823	An Act to amend and render more effectual the Provisions of an Act made in the Fiftieth Year of His late Majesty's Reign, for preventing the administering and taking unlawful Oaths in Ireland	Section Six from "and that no person" to end of that Section. Section Nine. Section Ten from "and the venue" to "thereupon". Section Eleven.
4 Geo. 4. c. 89	Law Costs (Ireland) Act 1823	An Act to limit and regulate the Expense of certain Proceedings in the Courts of Justice in Ireland in the Particulars therein mentioned	Section Two.
4 Geo. 4. c. 94	Duties on Spirits Act 1823	An Act to grant certain Duties of Excise upon Spirits distilled from Corn or Grain in Scotland and Ireland, and upon Licences for Stills for making such Spirits; and to provide for the better collecting and securing such Duties, and for the warehousing of such Spirits without Payment of Duty	Except Section One hundred and thirty-three.
4 Geo. 4. c. 95	Turnpike Roads Act 1823	An Act to explain and amend an Act passed in the Third Year of the reign of His present Majesty, to amend the general Laws now in being for regulating Turnpike Roads in that Part of Great Britain called England	Sections One, Three, Four, Seven to Nine, Eleven, Twelve, Fourteen, Eighteen, Twenty-two, Twenty-five, Twenty-seven, Twenty-nine, Thirty-five, Thirty-eight, Forty, Forty-two, Forty-six, Forty-eight, Fifty-one, Sixty-four, Seventy, Seventy-four, Seventy-seven, Seventy-nine. Eighty from " and it shall be lawful " to the end of that Section, Eighty-one, Eighty-four to Eighty-eight, Eighty-nine to "repealed; and", and Ninety-four. Schedule No. 2.
4 Geo. 4. c. 97	Commissary Courts (Scotland) Act 1823	An Act for the Regulation of the Court of the Commissaries of Edinburgh; and for altering and regulating the Jurisdiction of Inferior Commissaries in Scotland	Sections Eleven, Twelve, Sixteen to Nineteen, Twenty-one, and Twenty-two.
4 Geo. 4. c. 99	Composition for Tithes (Ireland) Act 1823	An Act to provide for the establishing of Compositions for Tithes in Ireland for a limited Time.	The whole act.
4 Geo. 4. c. 100	Appropriation Act 1823	An Act for raising the Sum of Fourteen millions seven hundred thousand Pounds by Exchequer Bills; for applying a certain Sum of Money for the Service of the Year One thousand eight hundred and twenty-three; and for further appropriating the Supplies granted in this Session of Parliament.	The whole act.
5 Geo. 4. c. 2	Exchequer Bills Act 1824	An Act for raising the Sum of Fifteen Millions by Exchequer Bills, for the Service of the Year One thousand eight hundred and twenty-four.	The whole act.
5 Geo. 4. c. 3	Supply Act 1824	An Act for granting and applying certain Sums of Money for the Service of the Year One thousand eight hundred and twenty-four.	The whole act.
5 Geo. 4. c. 7	Revenue Inquiry Act 1824	An Act to continue, until the First Day of July One thousand eight hundred and twenty-seven, Two Acts of His present Majesty, for the Appointment of Commissioners for inquiring into the Collection and Management of the Public Revenue.	The whole act.
5 Geo. 4. c. 12	Gaol Sessions Act 1824	An Act to facilitate, in those Counties which are divided into Ridings or Divisions, the Execution of an Act of the last Session of Parliament, for consolidating and amending the laws relating to the Building, Repairing, and Regulating of certain Gaols and Houses of Correction in England and Wales	Section Eighteen.
5 Geo. 4. c. 13	Mutiny Act 1824	An Act for punishing Mutiny and Desertion; and for the better Payment of the Army and their Quarters.	The whole act.
5 Geo. 4. c. 14	Marine Mutiny Act 1824	An Act for the regulating of His Majesty's Royal Marine Forces while on Shore.	The whole act.
5 Geo. 4. c. 15	Duties on Sugar, etc. Act 1824	An Act the title of which begins with the words,—An Act for continuing to His Majesty for One Year,—and ends with the words,—One thousand eight hundred and twenty-four.	The whole act.
5 Geo. 4. c. 19	Male Convicts Act 1824	An Act to provide for the future Confinement of Male Convicts, removed from the General Penitentiary, and now on Board Vessels in the River Thames.	The whole act.
5 Geo. 4. c. 22	Repeal of Certain Duties Act 1824	An Act to repeal the Duties on all Articles the Manufacture of Great Britain and Ireland respectively, on their Importation into either country from the other.	The whole act.
5 Geo. 4. c. 23	Board of Works (Ireland) Act 1824	An Act to amend an Act of the Fifty-seventh Year of His late Majesty's Reign, for abolishing certain Offices, and for regulating certain other Offices, in Ireland; so far as relates to the Commissioners of the Board of Works there.	The whole act.
5 Geo. 4. c. 25	Burial (Ireland) Act 1824	An Act to repeal so much of an Act passed in the Ninth Year of the Reign of King William the Third, as relates to Burials in suppressed Monasteries, Abbeys, or Convents, in Ireland; and to make further Provision with respect to the Burial, in Ireland, of Persons dissenting from the Established Church	Sections One to "Repealed". Sections Two to Four.
5 Geo. 4. c. 27	Burial (Ireland) Act 1824	An Act the title of which begins with the words,—An Act to explain and amend an Act of the Parliament of Ireland,—and ends with the words,— Ecclesiastical Courts within the Kingdom of Ireland.	The whole act.
5 Geo. 4. c. 29	County Treasurers (Ireland) Act 1824	An Act to amend an Act of the last Session of Parliament, for making more effectual Regulations for the Election, and for securing the Performance of the Duties of County Treasurers in Ireland.	The whole act.
5 Geo. 4. c. 31	Quartering of Soldiers Act 1824	An Act for fixing, until the Twenty-fifth Day of March One thousand eight hundred and twenty-five, the Rates of Subsistence to be paid to Innkeepers and others on quartering Soldiers.	The whole act.
5 Geo. 4. c. 33	Militia Pay Act 1824	An Act the title of which begins with the words,—An Act to defray,—and ends with the words,—One thousand eight hundred and twenty-five.	The whole act.
5 Geo. 4. c. 36	Public Works Loans Act 1824	An Act to amend and render more effectual the several Acts for the issuing of Exchequer Bills for Public Works	Section One to "purposes mentioned in such application." Sections Three and Six. Section Seven from " or under an Act " to " repairing Gaols in England". Section Eight.
5 Geo. 4. c. 37	Aliens Act 1824	An Act to continue for Two Years, and to amend an Act of the Fifty-sixth Year of His late Majesty, for establishing Regulations respecting Aliens arriving in or resident in this Kingdom, in certain Cases.	The whole act.
5 Geo. 4. c. 38	Highland Roads (Scotland) Act 1824	An Act to amend Two Acts for maintaining and keeping in Repair the Military and Parliamentary Roads in the Highlands of Scotland	Sections One to Five. Section Six to "wherefore be it enacted that ".
5 Geo. 4. c. 40	Duties on Glass, etc. Act 1824	An Act to continue, until the Tenth Day of October One thousand eight hundred and twenty-seven, an Act relating to Duties of Excise on Crown, Flint, and Phial Glass, and to alter certain Laws of Excise relating to Flint Glass; and also an Act for suspending Part of the Duties on Sweets or Made Wines.	The whole act.
5 Geo. 4. c. 42	Supply (No. 2) Act 1824	An Act for applying the Surplus of the Grants of One thousand eight hundred and twenty-three, and the Surplus of the Consolidated Fund, to the Service of the Year One thousand eight hundred and twenty-four.	The whole act.
5 Geo. 4. c. 48	Crown Lands Act 1824	An Act the title of which begins with the words,—An Act to enable the Commissioners of His Majesty's Treasury,—and ends with the words,—Land Revenue of the Crown; and for other Purposes.	The whole act.
5 Geo. 4. c. 51	Newfoundland Fisheries Act 1824	An Act to repeal several Laws relating to the Fisheries carried on upon the Banks and Shores of Newfoundland, and to make Provision for the better Conduct of the said Fisheries for Five Years, and from thence to the End of the then next Session of Parliament.	The whole act.
5 Geo. 4. c. 54	Licenses to Brew and Sell Beer, etc. Act 1824	An Act to repeal the Duties on Licences to brew and to retail Beer, Spirits, and Foreign Wine, and to grant other Duties in lieu thereof; and to amend the Laws for regulating the Licensing of Alehouses, and the Duties on Brewers and Retailers of Beer.	The whole act.
5 Geo. 4. c. 55	Duties on Hides, etc. Act 1824	An Act the title of which begins with the words,—An Act to assimilate the Duties,—and ends with the words,—payable throughout the United Kingdom.	The whole act.
5 Geo. 4. c. 56	Distilleries (Scotland) Act 1824	An Act to continue, until the Tenth Day of November One thousand eight hundred and twenty-six, certain Parts of an Act of the Third Year of His present Majesty, among other Things for the preventing private Distillation in Scotland.	The whole act.
5 Geo. 4. c. 57	Horse Hides Act 1824	An Act to repeal Four Acts of His late Majesty, relating to the Use of Horse Hides in making Boots and Shoes, and for better preventing the damaging of Raw Hides and Skins in the flaying thereof.	The whole act.
5 Geo. 4. c. 58	Charity Commission Act 1824	An Act to continue for Four Years, and from thence until the End of the then next Session of Parliament, the Powers of the Commissioners for enquiring concerning Charities in England and Wales.	The whole act.
5 Geo. 4. c. 59	Mar Peerage Restoration Act 1824	An Act for exhibiting a Bill for the Restitution of John Francis Erskine of Mar.	The whole act.
5 Geo. 4. c. 63	Composition for Tithes (Ireland) Act 1824	An Act to amend an Act of the last Session of Parliament, for providing for the establishing of Compositions for Tithes in Ireland.	The whole act.
5 Geo. 4. c. 65	Repeal of Salt Duties Act 1824	An Act to repeal the Duties and Laws in respect of Salt and Rock Salt.	The whole act.
5 Geo. 4. c. 66	Silk Manufactures Act 1824	An Act to repeal certain Acts of His late Majesty, relating to the Wages of Persons employed in the Manufacture of Silk, and of Silk mixed with other Materials.	The whole act.
5 Geo. 4. c. 67	Newfoundland Act 1824	An Act for the better Administration of Justice in Newfoundland, and for other Purposes	Sections Eleven, Eighteen, and Nineteen. Section Twenty-two from " that the Governor " to " instituted under this Act; and". Sections Twenty-three to Thirty-four and Thirty-six. Repealed as to all Her Majesty's Dominions.
5 Geo. 4. c. 68	Marriages Confirmation (Newfoundland) Act 1824	An Act to repeal an Act passed in the Fifty-seventh Year of the Reign of His late Majesty King George the Third, intituled An Act to regulate the Celebration of Marriages in Newfoundland; and to make further Provision for the Celebration of Marriages in the said Colony and its Dependencies	Section One to " repealed ". Section Two to end of Act. Repealed as to all Her Majesty's Dominions.
5 Geo. 4. c. 72	Teinds Act 1824	An Act for amending and rendering more effectual an Act for augmenting Parochial Stipends in certain Cases, in Scotland.	Section Seven.
5 Geo. 4. c. 74	Weights and Measures Act 1824	An Act for ascertaining and establishing Uniformity of Weights and Measures.	Section One from " from and after the First day of May " to " Imperial Standard Yard ". Section Four from " from and after " to " computed and ascertained; and "; and from " and that seven " to " be a pound avoirdupois ". Section Seven, the words "coals, culm". Section Eight from " in making use of " to " each cove; and that ". Section Nine, the words " coals, culm,". Section Thirteen. Section Fifteen, the words " where no special agreement shall be made to the contrary "; and from " and in all cases " to end of that Section. Sections Sixteen to Nineteen, and Twenty-three.
5 Geo. 4. c. 78	Duchy of Cornwall Act 1824	An Act to amend an Act of the Third Year of His present Majesty, for enabling His Majesty to lease Lands belonging to the Duchy of Cornwall, and to authorise the Sale and Purchase of the Forage and Butlerage of Wine in the Ports of the County of Cornwall, and in Plymouth.	Except Section Eight.
5 Geo. 4. c. 82	Clerk of the Parliaments Act 1824	An Act for better regulating the Office of Clerk of the Parliaments.	Sections One and Four. Section Five from " by the person " to " as aforesaid; and afterwards ". Section Six.
5 Geo. 4. c. 83	Vagrancy Act 1824	An Act for the Punishment of idle and disorderly Persons, and Rogues and Vagabonds, in that Part of Great Britain called England.	Sections One and Two.
5 Geo. 4. c. 84	Transportation Act 1824	An Act for the Transportation of Offenders from Great Britain.	Section One. Section Two to "under the provisions of this Act; and". Section Seventeen from "Provided always, that" to end of section. Also so much of this Act as provides for the appointment of the superintendent therein mentioned, or any overseer or any assistant or deputy to such superintendent.
5 Geo. 4. c. 89	Relief of Certain Incumbents Act 1824	An Act for the Relief of Incumbents of Ecclesiastical Livings or Benefices mortgaged for building, rebuilding, or purchasing Houses and other necessary Buildings and Tenements for such Benefices.	The whole act.
5 Geo. 4. c. 90	Church of Scotland Act 1824	An Act to amend an Act for building additional Places of Worship in the Highlands and Islands of Scotland	Section One to " thereof; and ".
5 Geo. 4. c. 93	Salaries of County Officers (Ireland) Act 1824	An Act to amend the Acts of the last Session of Parliament relating to Presentments by Grand Juries for Payment of the Salaries of public Officers of the several Counties in Ireland.	The whole act.
5 Geo. 4. c. 94	Prosecution by Customs or Excise Act 1824	An Act to allow the Averment of the Order for Prosecution by Commissioners of Customs or Excise to be sufficient Proof of the Order having been made.	The whole act.
5 Geo. 4. c. 96	Masters and Workmen Arbitration Act 1824	An Act to consolidate and amend the Laws relative to the Arbitration of Disputes between Masters and Workmen	Section One.
5 Geo. 4. c. 97	Artificers Going Abroad Act 1824	An Act to repeal the Laws relative to Artificers going into Foreign Parts.	The whole act.
5 Geo. 4. c. 102	Dublin Justices Act 1824	An Act to amend an Act of the Forty-eighth Year of the Reign of His late Majesty, for the more effectual Administration of the Office of a Justice of the Peace, and for the more effectual Prevention of Felonies within the District of Dublin Metropolis	Sections Four, Five, Six, Twelve, Fifteen, Twenty, Twenty-three, Twenty-four, and Twenty-nine.
5 Geo. 4. c. 103	Church Building Act 1824	An Act to make further Provision, and to amend and render more effectual Three Acts, passed in the Fifty-eighth and Fifty-ninth Years of His late Majesty, and in the Third Year of His present Majesty, for building and promoting the building of additional Churches in populous Parishes	Sections One to Four, and Nineteen.
5 Geo. 4. c. 105	Insurrections, etc. (Ireland) Act 1824	An Act further to continue and to amend an Act, made in the Third Year of His present Majesty's Reign, for suppressing Insurrections and preventing Disturbances of the public Peace in Ireland.	The whole act.
5 Geo. 4. c. 108	Transfer of Singapore to East India Company, etc. Act 1824	An Act for vesting in the East India Company certain Possessions newly acquired in the East Indies, and for authorizing the Removal of Convicts from Sumatra.	Repealed as to all Her Majesty's Dominions.
5 Geo. 4. c. 110	Unlawful Weights (Ireland) Act 1824	An Act for the Indemnity of Magistrates in Proceedings against Persons using unlawful Weights in Ireland.	The whole act.
5 Geo. 4. c. 113	Slave Trade Act 1824	An Act to amend and consolidate the Laws relating to the Abolition of the Slave Trade	Sections One, Thirty, and Forty-five. Section Fifty-one from " and all the said penalties " to the end of that Section. Sections Sixty-three, Sixty-four, Sixty-six, Sixty-nine, Eighty-one, and Eighty-two. Repealed as to all Her Majesty's Dominions.
5 Geo. 4. c. 114	Marine Assurance Act 1824	An Act to repeal so much of an Act of the Sixth Year of His late Majesty King George the First, as restrains any other Corporations than those in the Act named, and any Societies or Partnerships, from effecting Marine Assurances, and lending Money on Bottomry.	The whole act.
5 Geo. 4. c. 115	Appropriation Act 1824	An Act for applying certain Monies therein mentioned for the Service of the Year One thousand eight hundred and twenty-four; and for further appropriating the Supplies granted in this Session of Parliament.	The whole act.
6 Geo. 4. c. 1	Supply Act 1825	An Act for granting and applying certain Sums of Money for the Service of the Year One thousand eight hundred and twenty-five.	The whole act.
6 Geo. 4. c. 2	Exchequer Bills Act 1825	An Act for raising the Sum of Twenty Millions by Exchequer Bills, for the Service of the Year One thousand eight hundred and twenty-five.	The whole act.
6 Geo. 4. c. 4	Unlawful Societies (Ireland) Act 1825	An Act to amend certain Acts relating to unlawful Societies in Ireland.	The whole act.
6 Geo. 4. c. 5	Mutiny Act 1825	An Act for punishing Mutiny and Desertion; and for the better Payment of the Army and their Quarters.	The whole act.
6 Geo. 4. c. 6	Marine Mutiny Act 1825	An Act for the regulating of His Majesty's Royal Marine Forces while on Shore.	The whole act.
6 Geo. 4. c. 7	House Tax Act 1825	An Act for the further Repeal of certain Duties of Assessed Taxes, and for granting Relief in the Cases therein mentioned	Section Two from " and when any window " to " increase of such window or windows "; the words " or of the increase of windows "; the words " or the additional window or windows therein shall be made or restored "; and from " or such additional number of window or windows " to " unoccupied, or restored ". Section Six.
6 Geo. 4. c. 9	Duties on Offices Act 1825	An Act for continuing to His Majesty for One Year certain Duties on Personal Estates, Offices, and Pensions in England; for repealing certain Duties on Sugar imported; for the Service of the Year One thousand eight hundred and twenty-five	Sections One, Two, Four, Six, Eight to Fourteen, Nineteen, Twenty-three, Twenty-four, Twenty-six to Thirty-eight, and the rest of the Act so far as it relates to duties on estates in ready money, debts, goods, wares, merchandise, chattels, or other personal estate, or to duties on sugar.
6 Geo. 4. c. 10	Courts of Justice Inquiry (Ireland) Act 1825	An Act to facilitate the Proceedings before the Commissioners of Inquiry relating to Courts of Justice in Ireland.	The whole act.
6 Geo. 4. c. 11	Payment of Creditors (Scotland) Act 1825	An Act to continue, until the Twenty-fifth Day of July One thousand eight hundred and twenty-six, an Act passed in the Fifty-fourth Year of the Reign of His late Majesty, for rendering the Payment of Creditors more equal and expeditious in Scotland.	The whole act.
6 Geo. 4. c. 12	Weights and Measures Act 1825	An Act to prolong the Time of the Commencement of an Act of the last Session of Parliament, for ascertaining and establishing Uniformity of Weights and Measures	Section One. Section Two, the words "coals, culm," the words "coals and all other"; and from "and the height" to the end of that Section.
6 Geo. 4. c. 14	Supply (No. 2) Act 1825	An Act for applying the Sum of Ten millions five hundred thousand Pounds out of the Consolidated Fund, for the Service of the Year One thousand eight hundred and twenty-five.	The whole act.
6 Geo. 4. c. 20	Quartering of Soldiers Act 1825	An Act for fixing, until the Twenty-fifth Day of March One thousand eight hundred and twenty-six, the Rates of Subsistence to be paid to Innkeepers and others on quartering Soldiers.	The whole act.
6 Geo. 4. c. 22	Jurors (Scotland) Act 1825	An Act to regulate the Qualification and the Manner of enrolling Jurors in Scotland, and of choosing Jurors on Criminal Trials there; and to unite Counties for the Purposes of Trial in Cases of High Treason in Scotland	Section Twenty-two.
6 Geo. 4. c. 23	Sheriff Courts (Scotland) Act 1825	An Act for the better Regulation of the Sheriff and Stewart and Burgh Courts of Scotland	Section Two from " Provided always " to the end of that Section. Section Seven from " Provided always " to the end of that Section.
6 Geo. 4. c. 24	Small Debts (Scotland) Act 1825	An Act for the more easy Recovery of Small Debts in the Sheriff Courts in Scotland.	The whole act.
6 Geo. 4. c. 25	Criminal Law Act 1825	An Act for defining the Rights of Capital Convicts who receive Pardon, and of Convicts after having been punished for Clergyable Felonies; for placing Clerks in Orders on the same Footing with other Persons, as to Crimes of the same Nature; and for limiting the Time within which Actions may be brought by Persons acquitted.	The whole act.
6 Geo. 4. c. 29	Importation Act 1825	An Act to repeal an Act made in the Second Year of the Reign of King William and Queen Mary, for the discouraging the Importation of Thrown Silk.	The whole act.
6 Geo. 4. c. 30	Court of Chancery (Ireland) Officers Act 1825	An Act to amend an Act of the Fourth Year of His present Majesty's Reign, for the better Administration of Justice in the Court of Chancery in Ireland	Sections Two to Four, Six to Fifteen, Seventeen, and the Table.
6 Geo. 4. c. 31	Militia Pay Act 1825	An Act the title of which begins with the words,—An Act to defray the Charge,—and ends with the words,—Twenty-fifth Day of March One thousand eight hundred and twenty-six.	The whole act.
6 Geo. 4. c. 32	Land Tax Act 1825	An Act to provide for the Application of Monies arising in certain Cases of Assessments for Land Tax in Great Britain	Section One from "Provided always" to "person or persons respectively", and the words "recovery of all such money raised in former years as aforesaid". Sections Two, Six, and Nine. Note to Schedule A.
6 Geo. 4. c. 33	Dissolution of Levant Company Act 1825	An Act to repeal certain Acts relating to the Governor and Company of Merchants of England trading to the Levant Seas, and the Duties payable to them; and to authorise the Transfer and Disposal of the Possessions and Property of the said Governor and Company, for the Public Service.	The whole act.
6 Geo. 4. c. 34	Duke of Atholl's Rights, Isle of Man Act 1825	An Act to empower the Commissioners of His Majesty's Treasury to purchase a certain Annuity in respect of Duties of Customs levied in the Isle of Man, and any reversionary Sovereign Rights in the said Island, belonging to John Duke of Atholl.	The whole act.
6 Geo. 4. c. 35	Public Works Loans Act 1825	An Act to render more effectual the several Acts for authorising Advances for carrying on Public Works, so far as relates to Ireland	Sections One to Seven.
6 Geo. 4. c. 37	Exciseable Liquors Act 1825	An Act to provide for the future Assimilation of the Duties of Excise upon Sweets or Made Wines, home-made and imported, upon Vinegar, and upon Cyder and Perry, in Great Britain and Ireland, and to continue the Duty of Excise on Sweets or Made Wines in Great Britain until the Fifth Day of January One thousand eight hundred and twenty-six.	The whole act.
6 Geo. 4. c. 42	Bankers (Ireland) Act 1825	An Act for the Regulation of Copartnerships of certain Bankers in Ireland	Sections One, Four, and Eight.
6 Geo. 4. c. 43	Impounding of Distresses (Ireland) Act 1825	An Act to amend and render more effectual an Act made in the Tenth Year of the Reign of King Charles the First, for impounding of Distresses in Ireland.	The whole act.
6 Geo. 4. c. 45	Articles of Clerkship Enrolment Act 1825	An Act to allow, until the Fifth Day of July One thousand eight hundred and twenty-five, the Enrolment of Articles of Clerkship to Solicitors and Attornies in England, and the making and filing of Affidavits relating thereto, in certain Cases, where the same may have been omitted or neglected.	The whole act.
6 Geo. 4. c. 47	Leasing-making (Scotland) Act 1825	An Act for restricting the Punishment of Leasing-making, Sedition, and Blasphemy, in Scotland	Sections Three to Five.
6 Geo. 4. c. 48	Justices of the Peace Small Debt (Scotland) Act 1825	An Act to alter and amend certain Acts of the Thirty-ninth and Fortieth Year of King George the Third, for the Recovery of Small Debts in Scotland	Section One. Section Three from "agreeable to the form" to "concluding against the defender". Form of Complaint in Schedule A.
6 Geo. 4. c. 52	Presentments for Salaries (Ireland) Act 1825	An Act to amend an Act of the last Session of Parliament, for amending former Acts relating to Presentments by Grand Juries for Payment of the Salaries of Treasurers and Public Officers of the several Counties in Ireland.	The whole act.
6 Geo. 4. c. 54	Lunatic Asylums (Ireland) Act 1825	An Act to amend an Act of the First and Second Years of His present Majesty, for the Establishment of Asylums for the Lunatic Poor in Ireland	Section Two.
6 Geo. 4. c. 55	Court of Exchequer (Ireland) Act 1825	An Act to regulate the Proceedings as to sealing of Writs in the Court of Exchequer in Ireland.	The whole act.
6 Geo. 4. c. 57	Poor Relief (Settlement) Act 1825	An Act for the Amendment of the Law respecting the Settlement of the Poor, so far as regards renting Tenements and paying Parochial Taxes	Section One.
6 Geo. 4. c. 58	Duties on Beer, Malt, etc. Act 1825	An Act for providing equivalent Rates of Excise Duties, Allowances, and Drawbacks on Beer and Malt, and on Spirits, made in Scotland or Ireland, according to the Measure of the new Imperial Standard Gallon	Except so much of Section Two as imposes malt duties, and Section Six.
6 Geo. 4. c. 64	Duty on Wheat Act 1825	An Act to alter for One Year, and until the end of the then next Session of Parliament, the Duty on Wheat the Produce of the British Possessions in North America.	The whole act.
6 Geo. 4. c. 65	Entry of Warehoused Corn Act 1825	An Act to allow, until the Fifteenth Day of August One thousand eight hundred and twenty-five, the Entry of Warehoused Corn, Grain, and Wheaten Flour for Home Consumption, on Payment of Duty.	The whole act.
6 Geo. 4. c. 68	Postage (No. 3) Act 1825	An Act to regulate the Conveyance of printed Votes and Proceedings in Parliament, and Printed Newspapers, by Packet Boats between Great Britain and Ireland, and the British Colonies, and also in the United Kingdom.	The whole act.
6 Geo. 4. c. 70	Exchequer Bills (No. 2) Act 1825	An Act for raising the Sum of Ten millions five hundred thousand Pounds, by Exchequer Bills, for the Service of the Year One thousand eight hundred and twenty-five.	The whole act.
6 Geo. 4. c. 71	Annuity for Prince George of Cumberland Act 1825	An Act to enable His Majesty to grant an Annual Sum to His Royal Highness Ernest Augustus Duke of Cumberland, for the Purpose of enabling His said Royal Highness to provide for the Support and Education of His Royal Highness Prince George Frederick Alexander Charles Ernest Augustus of Cumberland.	The whole act.
6 Geo. 4. c. 72	Annuity for Princess Victoria Act 1825	An Act to enable His Majesty to grant an Annual Sum to Her Royal Highness Mary Louisa Victoria Duchess of Kent, for the Purpose of enabling Her said Royal Highness to provide for the Support and Education of Her Highness the Princess Alexandrina Victoria of Kent.	The whole act.
6 Geo. 4. c. 78	Quarantine Act 1825	An Act to repeal the several Laws relating to the Performance of Quarantine, and to make other Provisions in lieu thereof	Section One.
6 Geo. 4. c. 80	Duties on Spirits Act 1825	An Act to repeal the Duties payable in respect of Spirits distilled in England, and of Licences for distilling, rectifying, or compounding such Spirits, and for the Sale of Spirits; and to impose other Duties in lieu thereof; and to provide other Regulations for the Collection of the said Duties, and for the Sale of Spirits, and for the Warehousing of such Spirits, without Payment of Duty, for Exportation	Except Section One hundred and forty-five.
6 Geo. 4. c. 81	Excise Licences Act 1825	An Act to repeal several Duties payable on Excise Licences in Great Britain and Ireland, and to impose other Duties in lieu thereof; and to amend the Laws for granting Excise Licences	Section One. Section Two, so far as it relates to the following subjects; namely,— AUCTIONS. Brewers of table beer only for sale. CANDLES. COFFEE. GLASS. HIDES. PAPER. PRINTED GOODS. SOAP. Makers of stills in Scotland or Ireland. STARCH. Makers of sweets or made wines, or of mead or metheglin, for sale. WINE. Section Three. Section Nine, the words "except persons exercising or carrying on the trade or business of a brewer of beer in Ireland, or the trade or business of an auctioneer or person selling any goods or chattels, lands, tenements, or hereditaments, by auction in any part of the United Kingdom"; and from "and that from and after the fifth day of July" to the end of that Section. Sections Nineteen and Twenty. Section Twenty-six from "every person exercising" to "table beer only for sale"; from "every maker of paper" to "soap for sale"; from "every starch maker" to "metheglin for sale"; from "every drawer" to "for wire"; from "every person trading" to "chocolate or pepper"; and the words "every maker of stills in Scotland or Ireland". Sections Thirty-one, Thirty-three, Thirty-four, Thirty-six, and Thirty-seven.
6 Geo. 4. c. 82	Chief Justice's Pension Act 1825	An Act to abolish the Sale of Offices in the Court of King's Bench in England, to make Provision for the Lord Chief Justice of the said Court, and to grant an additional Annuity to the said Lord Chief Justice on Resignation of his Office.	Except Section Ten.
6 Geo. 4. c. 83	Court of Common Pleas Act 1825	An Act to abolish the sale of Offices in the Court of Common Pleas in England, to make Provision for the Lord Chief Justice of the said Court, and to grant an additional Annuity to the said Lord Chief Justice on Resignation of his Office	Except Section Nine.
6 Geo. 4. c. 84	Judges' Pensions Act 1825	An Act to provide for the augmenting the Salaries of the Master of the Rolls and the Vice Chancellor of England, the Chief Baron of the Court of Exchequer, and the Puisne Judges and Barons of the Courts in Westminster Hall; and to enable His Majesty to grant an Annuity to such Vice Chancellor, and additional Annuities to such Master of the Rolls, Chief Baron, and Puisne Judges and Barons, on their Resignation	Except Sections Four, Five, and Seven.
6 Geo. 4. c. 85	Indian Salaries and Pensions Act 1825	An Act for further regulating the Payment of the Salaries and Pensions to the Judges of His Majesty's Courts in India, and the Bishop of Calcutta; for authorising the Transportation of Offenders from the Island of Saint Helena; and for more effectually providing for the Administration of Justice in Singapore and Malacca, and certain Colonies on the Coast of Coromandel	Sections Three and Six. Section Eighteen from "without benefit of clergy" to "accordingly". Sections Nineteen and Twenty-one. Repealed as to all Her Majesty's Dominions.
6 Geo. 4. c. 86	Courts of Justice (Scotland) Act 1825	An Act to provide for the Erection of certain Courts of Justice in Scotland	Except Section Five.
6 Geo. 4. c. 87	Consular Advances Act 1825	An Act to regulate the Payment of Salaries and Allowances to British Consuls at Foreign Ports, and the Disbursements at such Ports for certain Public Purposes	Sections Sixteen, Seventeen, and Twenty-two.
6 Geo. 4. c. 88	West Indian Bishops, etc. Act 1825	An Act to make Provision for the Salaries of certain Bishops, and other Ecclesiastical Dignitaries and Ministers, in the Diocese of Jamaica, and in the Diocese of Barbadoes and the Leeward Islands; and to enable His Majesty to grant Annuities to such Bishops upon the Resignation of their Offices	Sections Two to Four. Repealed as to all Her Majesty's Dominions.
6 Geo. 4. c. 89	Purchase of Common Law Offices Act 1825	An Act to authorize the Exchanger of the King's Bench and Common Pleas, and of the Seals of the Court of King's Bench and Common Pleas, and of Cusion Brevium of the Court of King's Bench, to take the Oath of Office.	The whole act.
6 Geo. 4. c. 91	Bubble Companies, etc. Act 1825	An Act the title of which begins with the words,—An Act to repeal,—and ends with the words,—Trading and other Companies.	The whole act.
6 Geo. 4. c. 93	Decrees, etc., Made at Rolls Court Act 1825	An Act to render valid certain Decrees and Orders at the Rolls Court.	The whole act.
6 Geo. 4. c. 99	Manors, etc. (Ireland) Act 1825	An Act to repeal an Act of the last Session of Parliament relating to the forming Tables of Manors, Parishes, and Townlands in Ireland, and to make Provision for ascertaining the Boundaries of the same.	The whole act.
6 Geo. 4. c. 101	Repair of Roads and Bridges (Ireland) Act 1825	An Act to provide for the repairing, maintaining, and keeping in Repair certain Roads and Bridges in Ireland.	The whole act.
6 Geo. 4. c. 102	Deserted Children (Ireland) Act 1825	An Act to amend the Laws respecting deserted Children in Ireland.	The whole act.
6 Geo. 4. c. 103	Purchase for Naval Yard at Leith, etc. Act 1825	An Act to enable the principal Officers and Commissioners of His Majesty's Navy to acquire certain Portions of the Docks and Shore Ground at Leith for a Naval Yard, and to enable the Commissioners of the Treasury to advance a certain Sum of Money on the Security of the Docks and Harbour of Leith.	The whole act.
6 Geo. 4. c. 105	Customs Law Repeal Act 1825	An Act to repeal the several Laws relating to the Customs.	The whole act.
6 Geo. 4. c. 117	Duties on Glass, etc. Act 1825	An Act the title of which begins with the words,—An Act to repeal the Excise Duties,—and ends with the words,—until further Provision can be made.	The whole act.
6 Geo. 4. c. 118	Duties on Plate, etc. Act 1825	An Act the title of which begins with the words,—An Act to transfer the Collection,—and ends with the words, Man	Section One from "the Duties and Sums of Money granted and made payable by an Act passed in the Forty-seventh Year" to "Manufactured in Ireland"; and the words "and also upon or in respect of Licences to Persons to let to hire any Horse for the Purpose of travelling Post by the Mile, or from Stage to Stage in Ireland". Section Seven.
6 Geo. 4. c. 120	Court of Session Act 1825	An Act for the better regulating of the Forms of Process in the Courts of Law in Scotland	Section One from "and the Provisions of an Act" to the end of that section. Sections Two, Six to Nine, and Fourteen to Sixteen. Section Eighteen from "and if the Interlocutor of the Lord Ordinary" to "been before the Lord Ordinary". Section Twenty to "shall be final"; and the words "on cases prepared in consequence of such order or". Section Twenty-eight to "repealed". Sections Twenty-nine to Thirty-two, and Thirty-four. Section Thirty-five to "repealed". Sections Thirty-six, Thirty-eight, Thirty-nine, and Forty-one to Forty-three. Section Forty-eight, the words "or advocation". Section Forty-nine. Section Fifty the words "together with the Chief Commissioner of the Jury Court"; the words "and of the Jury Court"; and the words "the High Court of Admiralty, Court of Commissaries of Edinburgh, and". Sections Fifty-five and Fifty-six.
6 Geo. 4. c. 121	Insolvent Debtors Act 1825	An Act to enable the Insolvent Debtors Court to dispense, until the End of the next Session of Parliament, with the Necessity of Prisoners residing within the Walls in certain Cases.	The whole act.
6 Geo. 4. c. 128	Dublin Streets Act 1825	An Act to enable the Commissioners of His Majesty's Treasury to advance out of the Consolidated Fund certain Sums for the Payment of Debts due from the Commissioners of Wide Streets, and for the erecting a Corn Exchange in the City of Dublin; and to repeal certain Duties on Licences relating to Cards and Clubs in the City of Dublin	Sections One and Three.
6 Geo. 4. c. 131	Co-partnerships (Scotland) Act 1825	An Act to regulate the Mode in which certain Societies or Copartnerships in Scotland may sue and be sued.	The whole act.
6 Geo. 4. c. 133	Apothecaries Amendment Act 1825	An Act to amend and explain an Act of the Fifty-fifth Year of His late Majesty, for better regulating the Practice of Apothecaries throughout England and Wales.	The whole act.
6 Geo. 4. c. 134	Appropriation Act 1825	An Act for applying the Surplus of the Grants of the Year One thousand eight hundred and twenty-four to the Service of the Year One thousand eight hundred and twenty-five; and for further appropriating the Supplies granted in this Session of Parliament.	The whole act.
7 Geo. 4. c. 1	Supply Act 1826	An Act for granting and applying certain Sums of Money for the Service of the Year One thousand eight hundred and twenty-six.	The whole act.
7 Geo. 4. c. 2	Exchequer Bills Act 1826	An Act for raising the Sum of Ten Millions by Exchequer Bills, for the Service of the Year One thousand eight hundred and twenty-six.	The whole act.
7 Geo. 4. c. 4	Salaries of Bishops, etc., in West Indies Act 1826	An Act the title of which begins with the words,—An Act to amend an Act of the last Session of Parliament,— and ends with the words,—upon the Resignation of their Offices	Section One. Section Two from "the Sum to be paid to the Ministers" to "Leeward Islands; and that". Repealed as to all Her Majesty's Dominions.
7 Geo. 4. c. 5	Shipping Under Treaties of Commerce Act 1826	An Act to give effect to Treaties of Commerce with Countries in America not at present provided with National Merchant Shipping.	The whole act.
7 Geo. 4. c. 6	Bank Notes Act 1826	An Act to limit, and after a certain Period to prohibit, the issuing of Promissory Notes under a limited Sum in England	Sections One and Two. Section Three from "If any Body Politic or Corporate or Person or Persons shall" to "One thousand eight hundred and twenty-six; or". Section Eleven. Also Section Four, but as to this Section, so long only as 26 & 27 Vict. c. 105. continues in force.
7 Geo. 4. c. 7	Advances by Bank of England Act 1826	An Act to facilitate the advancing of Money by the Governor and Company of the Bank of England upon Deposits and Pledges.	The whole act.
7 Geo. 4. c. 10	Mutiny Act 1826	An Act for punishing Mutiny and Desertion; and for the better Payment of the Army and their Quarters.	The whole act.
7 Geo. 4. c. 11	Marine Mutiny Act 1826	An Act for the regulating of His Majesty's Royal Marine Forces while on Shore.	The whole act.
7 Geo. 4. c. 16	Chelsea and Kilmainham Hospitals Act 1826	An Act to consolidate and amend several Acts relating to the Royal Hospitals for Soldiers at Chelsea and Kilmainham	Sections Two to Five, Eight, Nine, Thirteen, Sixteen, and Eighteen to Twenty. Section Twenty-two from "the Payment of any Pensions" to "respecting the same; and that". Sections Thirty and Thirty-two. Section Thirty-three, so far as it relates to the Deduction for Stoppage or Charge therein referred to. Sections Thirty-six, Thirty-seven, and Fifty-two.
7 Geo. 4. c. 19	Assault and Battery (Scotland) Act 1826	An Act to repeal Two Acts of the Parliament of Scotland, relative to Assault and Battery pendente Lite.	The whole act.
7 Geo. 4. c. 23	Excise Act 1826	An Act to repeal the Duties and Drawbacks of Excise upon tawed Kid Skins, Sheep Skins, and Lamb Skins.	The whole act.
7 Geo. 4. c. 24	Quartering of Soldiers Act 1826	An Act for fixing, until the Twenty-fifth Day of March One thousand eight hundred and twenty-seven, the Rates of Subsistence to be paid to Innkeepers and others on quartering Soldiers.	The whole act.
7 Geo. 4. c. 25	Distillation (Scotland) Act 1826	An Act to continue, until the Fifth Day of July One thousand eight hundred and twenty-eight, an Act for preventing private Distillation in Scotland.	The whole act.
7 Geo. 4. c. 26	Duties on Personal Estates Act 1826	An Act for continuing to His Majesty for One Year certain Duties on Personal Estates, Offices, and Pensions in England, for the Service of the Year One thousand eight hundred and twenty-six.	The whole act.
7 Geo. 4. c. 27	Militia Pay Act 1826	An Act the title of which begins with the words,—An Act to defray the Charge,—and ends with the words,—One thousand eight hundred and twenty-seven.	The whole act.
7 Geo. 4. c. 30	Public Works Loans Act 1826	An Act to amend the several Acts for authorizing Advances for carrying on Public Works, and to extend the Provisions thereof in certain Cases.	Repealed as to all Her Majesty's Dominions.
7 Geo. 4. c. 37	Juries (East Indies) Act 1826	An Act to regulate the appointment of Juries in the East Indies.	Repealed as to all Her Majesty's Dominions.
7 Geo. 4. c. 40	Advances for Rebuilding London Bridge Act 1826	An Act to authorize the Lords Commissioners of His Majesty's Treasury to advance Money out of the Consolidated Fund towards the Expenses of rebuilding London Bridge.	The whole act.
7 Geo. 4. c. 41	Manor Courts (Ireland) Act 1826	An Act to amend the Laws for the Recovery of Small Debts, and the Proceedings for that Purpose, in the Manor Courts in Ireland.	The whole act.
7 Geo. 4. c. 46	Country Bankers Act 1826	An Act the title of which begins with the words,—An Act for the better regulating Copartnerships of certain Bankers in England,—and ends with the words,—as relates to the same.	The last Section.
7 Geo. 4. c. 47	Exportation of Salmon, etc., from Ireland Act 1826	An Act to allow, until the Fifth Day of April One thousand eight hundred and thirty, certain Bounties on the Exportation from Ireland of Salmon, Red Herrings, and Dried Sprats.	The whole act.
7 Geo. 4. c. 48	Customs Act 1826	An Act to alter and amend the several Laws relating to the Customs.	The whole act.
7 Geo. 4. c. 49	Excise (Ireland) Act 1826	An Act the title of which begins with the words,—An Act to amend several Acts for authorizing the Issue and Exchange of Money advanced by Collectors of Excise for Public Works in Ireland.	The whole act.
7 Geo. 4. c. 50	Exchequer Bills (No. 2) Act 1826	An Act for raising the Sum of Thirteen millions two hundred thousand Pounds by Exchequer Bills, for the Service of the Year One thousand eight hundred and twenty-six.	The whole act.
7 Geo. 4. c. 51	Sale of Crown Lands Act 1826	An Act for granting certain Rates to the Surveyor General and the Commissioners of the Land Revenue of His Crown, under an Act of the Forty-eighth Year of His late Majesty.	The whole act.
7 Geo. 4. c. 53	Importation of Silk Act 1826	An Act to regulate the Importation of Silk Goods until the Tenth Day of October One thousand eight hundred and twenty-eight, and to encourage the Silk Manufactures by the Repeal of certain Duties.	The whole act.
7 Geo. 4. c. 56	East India Officers' Act 1826	An Act to suspend the Provisions of an Act of His late Majesty, respecting the Appointment of Writers in the Service of the East India Company, and to authorize the Payment of the Allowances of the Officers while absent from India	Except Section Three. Repealed as to all Her Majesty's Dominions.
7 Geo. 4. c. 57	Insolvent Debtors (England) Act 1826	An Act to amend and consolidate the Laws for the Relief of Insolvent Debtors in England.	The whole act.
7 Geo. 4. c. 58	Yeomanry Act 1826	An Act to amend the Laws relating to Corps of Yeomanry Cavalry and Volunteers in Great Britain	Section One. Section Four from "so much of the said Act" to "repealed; and".
7 Geo. 4. c. 59	Merchant Seamen Act 1826	An Act to continue for Seven Years, and from thence to the End of the then next Session of Parliament, an Act of the Fifty-eighth Year of His late Majesty, for facilitating the Recovery of the Wages of Seamen in the Merchant Service.	The whole act.
7 Geo. 4. c. 61	Justices (Ireland) Act 1826	An Act to provide for the more effectual building, repairing, and enlarging of County Halls, County Offices, and other Buildings for holding the Assizes and Grand Sessions, and also Judges' Lodgings, throughout England and Wales.	Sections One and Two.
7 Geo. 4. c. 64	Criminal Law Act 1826	An Act for improving the Administration of Criminal Justice in England.	Sections Seven, Eight, Twenty, and Thirty-two.
7 Geo. 4. c. 65	Alehouses (England) Act 1826	An Act to continue until the First Day of January One thousand eight hundred and twenty-eight, and to the End of the then next Session of Parliament, an Act of the Third Year of His present Majesty, for regulating the Manner of licensing Alehouses in England.	The whole act.
7 Geo. 4. c. 67	Bankers (Scotland) Act 1826	An Act to regulate the Mode in which certain Societies or Copartnerships for Banking in Scotland may sue and be sued.	Sections Twelve and Sixteen.
7 Geo. 4. c. 70	Corn Act 1826	An Act to permit Foreign Corn, Meal, and Flour, mentioned, to be taken out for Home Consumption, until the Sixteenth Day of August One thousand eight hundred and twenty-seven.	The whole act.
7 Geo. 4. c. 71	Corn (No. 2) Act 1826	An Act to empower His Majesty to admit Foreign Corn for Home Consumption, under certain Limitations, until the First Day of January One thousand eight hundred and twenty-eight, or for Six Weeks after the Commencement of the then next ensuing Session of Parliament, if Parliament shall not then be sitting.	The whole act.
7 & 8 Geo. 4. c. 1	Supply (No. 2) Act 1826	An Act for raising a Sum of Money for the Service of the Year One thousand eight hundred and twenty-seven.	The whole act.
7 & 8 Geo. 4. c. 2	Exchequer Bills (No. 3) Act 1826	An Act for raising the Sum of Ten Millions, by Exchequer Bills, for the Service of the Year One thousand eight hundred and twenty-seven.	The whole act.
7 & 8 Geo. 4. c. 3	Importation Act 1826	An Act to confirm an Order in Council for allowing the Importation of certain Foreign Articles into the Island of Mauritius; for indemnifying all Persons who have advised or acted in execution of the same; and to permit the Importation of such Articles until the First Day of February One thousand eight hundred and twenty-eight.	The whole act.
7 & 8 Geo. 4. c. 4	Mutiny Act 1827	An Act for punishing Mutiny and Desertion; and for the better Payment of the Army and their Quarters.	The whole act.
7 & 8 Geo. 4. c. 5	Marine Mutiny Act 1827	An Act for the regulating of His Majesty's Royal Marine Forces while on Shore.	The whole act.
7 & 8 Geo. 4. c. 7	Duties on Personal Estates Act 1827	An Act to amend an Act of the last Session of Parliament, for granting Duties on Personal Estates, Offices, and Pensions in England, and certain Duties on Sugar imported into the United Kingdom; for the service of the Year One thousand eight hundred and twenty-seven.	The whole act.
7 & 8 Geo. 4. c. 9	Ounce Thread Manufacture Act 1827	An Act to repeal an Act of the Twenty-eighth Year of His late Majesty, for the better Regulation of the Manufacture of Gloves Thread.	The whole act.
7 & 8 Geo. 4. c. 10	Duke and Duchess of Clarence's Annuity Act 1827	An Act to enable His Majesty to make further Provision for the Royal Family.	The whole act.
7 & 8 Geo. 4. c. 11	Payment of Creditors (Scotland) Act 1827	An Act to continue, until the Twenty-fifth Day of July One thousand eight hundred and twenty-eight, an Act of the Fifty-fourth Year of His late Majesty, for rendering the Payment of Creditors more equal and expeditious in Scotland.	The whole act.
7 & 8 Geo. 4. c. 12	Public Works Loans (Ireland) Act 1827	An Act to indemnify such Persons as have omitted to qualify themselves for Offices and Employments, and for extending the Time limited for those Purposes respectively.	The whole act.
7 & 8 Geo. 4. c. 14	Quartering of Soldiers Act 1827	An Act for fixing, until the Twenty-fifth Day of March One thousand eight hundred and twenty-eight, the Rate of Subsistence to be paid to Innkeepers and others on quartering Soldiers.	The whole act.
7 & 8 Geo. 4. c. 16	Supply Act 1827	An Act for applying certain Sums of Money for the Service of the Year One thousand eight hundred and twenty-seven.	The whole act.
7 & 8 Geo. 4. c. 19	Passenger Vessels Act 1827	An Act to repeal an Act of the Sixth Year of His present Majesty, for regulating Vessels carrying Passengers to Foreign Parts.	The whole act.
7 & 8 Geo. 4. c. 22	Insolvent Debtors (Ireland) Act 1827	An Act to continue for One Year, and until the End of the then next Session of Parliament, the Acts for the Relief of Insolvent Debtors in Ireland.	The whole act.
7 & 8 Geo. 4. c. 23	Roads, etc. (Ireland) Act 1827	An Act to continue for One Year, and until the End of the then next Session of Parliament, an Act of the Sixth Year of His present Majesty, for providing for the repairing, maintaining, and keeping in repair certain Roads and Bridges in Ireland.	The whole act.
7 & 8 Geo. 4. c. 24	Turnpike Roads (England) Act 1827	An Act to amend the Acts for regulating Turnpike Roads in England	Section Eight.
7 & 8 Geo. 4. c. 25	Resignation Bonds Act 1827	An Act for the Relief of certain Spiritual Persons, and Patrons of Ecclesiastical Preferments, from certain Penalties; and rendering valid certain Bonds, Covenants, or other Assurances for the Resignation of Ecclesiastical Preferments.	The whole act.
7 & 8 Geo. 4. c. 27	Criminal Statutes Repeal Act 1827	An Act for repealing various Statutes in England relative to the Benefit of Clergy, and to Larceny and other Offences connected therewith, and to malicious Injuries to Property, and to Remedies against the Hundred.	The whole act.
7 & 8 Geo. 4. c. 31	Remedies Against the Hundred (England) Act 1827	An Act for consolidating and amending the Laws in England relative to Remedies against the Hundred	Section Five.
7 & 8 Geo. 4. c. 36	Deserted Children (Ireland) Act 1827	An Act to continue until the First Day of January One thousand eight hundred and twenty-eight, and from thence until the End of the then next Session of Parliament, an Act passed in the Sixth Year of the Reign of His present Majesty, respecting deserted Children in Ireland.	The whole act.
7 & 8 Geo. 4. c. 38	Presentments by Constables Act 1827	An Act for discontinuing certain Presentments by Constables.	The whole act.
7 & 8 Geo. 4. c. 39	Rates of Carriage of Goods Act 1827	An Act to repeal such Parts of Two Acts of King William and Queen Mary and of King George the Second, as relate to the settling the Rates of the Carriage of Goods.	The whole act.
7 & 8 Geo. 4. c. 41	Exchequer Bills Act 1827	An Act for raising the Sum of Thirteen millions eight hundred thousand Pounds by Exchequer Bills, for the Service of the Year One thousand eight hundred and twenty-seven.	The whole act.
7 & 8 Geo. 4. c. 42	Supply (No. 2) Act 1827	An Act for granting and applying certain Sums of Money for the Service of the Year One thousand eight hundred and twenty-seven.	The whole act.
7 & 8 Geo. 4. c. 44	Prerogative Court, etc. (Ireland) Act 1827	An Act to provide for the Payment of a Salary (in lieu of Fees) to the Judge of the Prerogative Court and Court of Faculties in Ireland.	The whole act.
7 & 8 Geo. 4. c. 45	Articles of Clerkship, etc., Inrolment Act 1827	An Act to allow, until the Twenty-fourth Day of October One thousand eight hundred and twenty-seven, the Importation of certain Articles of Clerkship and Assignments thereof.	The whole act.
7 & 8 Geo. 4. c. 47	Advances for Public Works Act 1827	An Act for the further Amendment and Extension of the Powers of the several Acts authorising Advances for carrying on Public Works	Section Two.
7 & 8 Geo. 4. c. 48	Alehouses (England) Act 1827	An Act to continue until the First Day of June One thousand eight hundred and twenty-eight, and from thence to the End of the then next Session of Parliament, an Act of the Third Year of His present Majesty, for regulating the Manner of licensing Alehouses in England.	The whole act.
7 & 8 Geo. 4. c. 50	Militia Pay Act 1827	An Act the title of which begins with the words,—An Act to defray,—and ends with the words,—One thousand eight hundred and twenty-eight.	The whole act.
7 & 8 Geo. 4. c. 51	Exchequer, Equity Side (Ireland), etc. Act 1827	An Act for further amending an Act passed in the Fourth Year of His present Majesty's Reign, for the better Administration of Justice in the Equity Side of the Court of Exchequer in Ireland.	The whole act.
7 & 8 Geo. 4. c. 52	Excise on Malt Act 1827	An Act to consolidate and amend certain Laws relating to the Revenue of Excise on Malt made in the United Kingdom; and for amending the Laws relating to Brewers in Ireland, and the Allowance in respect of the Malt Duty on Spirits made in Scotland and Ireland from Malt only	Sections Ten to Nineteen, Forty-seven to Fifty-three, Sixty-six to Seventy-five, Seventy-nine, Eighty, and Eighty-three.
7 & 8 Geo. 4. c. 53	Excise Management Act 1827	An Act to consolidate and amend the Laws relating to the Collection and Management of the Revenue of Excise throughout Great Britain and Ireland	Section Forty-eight. Section One hundred and twenty-seven. Section One hundred and twenty-eight, down to "or any part thereof," until all such proceedings shall be completed and ended," and from "all penalties and forfeitures which shall have been or shall be" to "commencement of this Act, and". Sections One hundred and twenty-nine and One hundred and thirty.
7 & 8 Geo. 4. c. 55	Board of Stamps in Great Britain and Ireland Act 1827	An Act to consolidate the Boards of Stamps in Great Britain and Ireland	Sections Two and Eight.
7 & 8 Geo. 4. c. 57	Importation of Corn Act 1827	An Act to permit, until the First Day of May One thousand eight hundred and twenty-eight, certain Corn, Meal, and Flour to be entered for Home Consumption.	The whole act.
7 & 8 Geo. 4. c. 59	Manor Courts (Ireland) Act 1827	An Act for further amending the Laws for the Recovery of Small Debts, and the Proceedings for that Purpose, in the Manor Courts in Ireland.	The whole act.
7 & 8 Geo. 4. c. 60	Compositions for Tithes (Ireland) Act 1827	An Act to amend the Acts for the establishing of Compositions for Tithes in Ireland.	The whole act.
7 & 8 Geo. 4. c. 61	Butter Trade (Ireland) Act 1827	An Act to amend the Laws for the Regulation of the Butter Trade in Ireland	Sections One and Two.
7 & 8 Geo. 4. c. 63	Mutiny (No. 2) Act 1827	An Act to explain so much of an Act of the present Session of Parliament, for punishing Mutiny and Desertion, as relates to the Transportation of Offenders.	The whole act.
7 & 8 Geo. 4. c. 65	Admiralty Act 1827	An Act to explain and remove Doubts touching the Admiralty	Section Four from "Provided always" to the end of that Section.
7 & 8 Geo. 4. c. 67	Petty Sessions (Ireland) Act 1827	An Act for the better Administration of Justice at the holding of Petty Sessions by Justices of the Peace in Ireland.	The whole Act, except Section Twelve from "and the office" to the end of that Section.
7 & 8 Geo. 4. c. 68	Crown Lands (Ireland) Act 1827	An Act for the Management and Improvement of the Land Revenues of the Crown in Ireland, and for other Purposes relating thereto.	The whole act.
7 & 8 Geo. 4. c. 70	Exchequer Bills and Appropriation Act 1827	An Act for enabling His Majesty to raise the Sum of Five hundred thousand Pounds by Exchequer Bills, and for appropriating the Supplies granted in this Session of Parliament.	The whole act.
7 & 8 Geo. 4. c. 72	Church Building Act 1827	An Act to amend and render more effectual an Act for the building of additional Churches in populous parishes	Sections One and Three.
7 & 8 Geo. 4. c. 74	Slave Trade (Convention with Brazil) Act 1827	An Act to continue, until the Thirty-first Day of December One thousand eight hundred and twenty-nine, an Act of the Fourth Year of His present Majesty, for the better Administration of Justice in New South Wales and Van Diemen's Land.	The whole act. (Note: This act was repealed by the Slave Trade Act 1873 (36 & 37 Vict. c. 88))
7 & 8 Geo. 4. c. 75	Land Tax Commissioners Act 1827	An Act to appoint Commissioners for carrying into execution several Acts, granting to His Majesty by a Land Tax to be raised in Great Britain, and continuing to His Majesty certain Duties on Personal Estates, Offices, and Pensions, in England	Sections Three, Five, and Seven.
9 Geo. 4. c. 1	Supply Act 1828	An Act for applying a Sum of Money for the Service of the Year One thousand eight hundred and twenty-eight.	The whole act.
9 Geo. 4. c. 2	Exchequer Bills Act 1828	An Act for raising the Sum of Twelve Millions, by Exchequer Bills, for the Service of the Year One thousand eight hundred and twenty-eight.	The whole act.
9 Geo. 4. c. 3	Marine Mutiny Act 1828	An Act for the regulating of His Majesty's Royal Marine Forces while on Shore.	The whole act.
9 Geo. 4. c. 4	Mutiny Act 1828	An Act for punishing Mutiny and Desertion; and for the better Payment of the Army and their Quarters.	The whole act.
9 Geo. 4. c. 5	Duties on Personal Estates, etc. Act 1828	An Act for continuing to His Majesty for One Year certain Duties on Personal Estates, Offices, and Pensions in England, for the Service of the Year One thousand eight hundred and twenty-eight.	The whole act.
9 Geo. 4. c. 7	Lighting, etc., of Cities, etc. (Ireland) Act 1828	An Act to continue for One Year, and from thence to the End of the then next Session of Parliament, so much of certain Acts of the Parliament of Ireland as relate to the lighting, cleansing and watching of Cities and Towns, for the lighting, cleansing, and watching of which no particular Provision is made by any Act of Parliament.	The whole act.
9 Geo. 4. c. 8	Quartering of Soldiers Act 1828	An Act for fixing, until the Twenty-fifth Day of March One thousand eight hundred and twenty-nine, the Rates of Subsistence to be paid to Innkeepers and others on quartering Soldiers.	The whole act.
9 Geo. 4. c. 10	Supply (No. 2) Act 1828	An Act for applying certain Sums of Money to the Service of the Year One thousand eight hundred and twenty-eight.	The whole act.
9 Geo. 4. c. 11	Use of Fire on Steamboats Act 1828	An Act to exempt Vessels propelled by Steam from the Penalties to which Vessels are liable when used as Passage Vessels for Hire on board in the Ports, Harbours, Rivers, Canals, and Lakes of Ireland.	The whole act.
9 Geo. 4. c. 12	Witnesses' Indemnity (Penryn) Act 1828	An Act to indemnify Witnesses who may give Evidence, before the Lords Spiritual and Temporal, on a Bill to exclude the Borough of Penryn from sending Members to serve in Parliament.	The whole act.
9 Geo. 4. c. 14	Statute of Frauds Amendment Act 1828	An Act for rendering a written Memorandum necessary to the Validity of certain Promises and Engagements	Section Ten.
9 Geo. 4. c. 16	Life Annuities Act 1828	An Act to repeal so much of several Acts as empowers the Commissioners for the Reduction of the National Debt to grant Life Annuities	Section One.
9 Geo. 4. c. 19	Supply (No. 3) Act 1828	An Act for applying a Sum of Money out of the Consolidated Fund for the Service of the Year One thousand eight hundred and twenty-eight.	The whole act.
9 Geo. 4. c. 20	Importation of Foreign Wheat Act 1828	An Act for prohibiting, during the present Session of Parliament, the Importation of Foreign Wheat into the Isle of Man; and for levying a Duty on Meal or Flour made of Foreign Wheat imported from the Isle of Man into the United Kingdom.	The whole act.
9 Geo. 4. c. 23	Bank Notes Act 1828	An Act to enable Bankers in England to issue certain unstamped Promissory Notes and Bills of Exchange, upon Payment of a Composition in lieu of the Stamp Duties thereon	Sections Sixteen and Seventeen.
9 Geo. 4. c. 24	Bills of Exchange (Ireland) Act 1828	An Act to repeal certain Acts, and to consolidate and amend the Laws relating to the Issue of Promissory Notes in Ireland	Section One.
9 Geo. 4. c. 25	Revenue Solicitors' Act 1828	An Act to authorise the Appointment of Persons to act as Solicitors on behalf of His Majesty in any Court or Jurisdiction in Revenue Matters	Section Two.
9 Geo. 4. c. 28	Pensions Act Amendment Act 1828	An Act to enlarge the Powers granted to His Majesty under an Act passed in the Fifty-seventh Year of His late Majesty, to enable His Majesty to recompense the Services of Persons holding, or who have held, certain high and efficient Civil Offices.	The whole act.
9 Geo. 4. c. 29	Supply (No. 4) Act 1828	An Act to authorize additional Circuit Courts of Justiciary to be held, and to facilitate Criminal Trials, in Scotland	Section Five from " so much of an Act passed " to " it is hereby provided that ".
9 Geo. 4. c. 30	Supply (No. 4) Act 1828	An Act for applying surplus Ways and Means to the Service of the Year One thousand eight hundred and twenty-eight.	The whole act.
9 Geo. 4. c. 32	Civil Rights of Convicts Act 1828	An Act for amending the Law of Evidence in certain Cases	Except Section Three.
9 Geo. 4. c. 33	Administration of Estates in India Act 1828	An Act to declare and settle the Law respecting the Liability of the real Estates of British Subjects and others, situate within the Jurisdiction of His Majesty's Supreme Courts in India, as Assets in the Hands of Executors and Administrators, to the Payment of the Debts of their deceased Owners.	Repealed except as to estates of persons dying before 1 January 1866. Repealed as to all Her Majesty's Dominions.
9 Geo. 4. c. 35	Protection of Purchasers Against Judgements (Ireland) Act 1828	An Act to protect Purchasers for valuable Consideration in Ireland against Judgments not served on Terra Tenants	Except Sections Eight and Nine.
9 Geo. 4. c. 36	Sugar Duties Act 1828	An Act for continuing to His Majesty for One Year certain Duties on Sugar imported into the United Kingdom, for the Service of the Year One thousand eight hundred and twenty-eight.	The whole act.
9 Geo. 4. c. 38	Land Tax Commissioners' Act 1828	An Act for rectifying Mistakes in the Names of the Land Tax Commissioners, and for appointing additional Commissioners, and indemnifying such persons as have acted without due Authority in execution of the Acts therein recited	Section Four.
9 Geo. 4. c. 39	Salmon Fisheries (Scotland) Act 1828	An Act for the Preservation of the Salmon Fisheries in Scotland	Section One from "the said Act" to "repealed; and that". Sections Two, Four, Five, Six, and Eight.
9 Geo. 4. c. 42	Church Building Society Act 1828	An Act to abolish Church Rates, and to provide for the better Collection and Application of voluntary Contributions for the purposes of enlarging and building Churches and Chapels	Sections One and Twelve to Fifteen.
9 Geo. 4. c. 44	Excise Act 1828	An Act to provide for the Execution, throughout the United Kingdom, of the several Laws of Excise relating to Licences and Survey on Tea, Coffee, Cocoa, Pepper, Tobacco, Snuff, Foreign and Colonial Spirits and Wine, notwithstanding the Transfer to the Customs of the Import Duties on any of such Commodities	Sections Three, Five, and Six.
9 Geo. 4. c. 45	Distillation of Spirits Act 1828	An Act to amend and to make perpetual, and to extend to the whole of the United Kingdom, certain Provisions contained in several Acts for regulating the Rectification, compounding, dealing in, or retailing of Spirits, and for preventing private Distillation, in Scotland; and to provide for the Payment of the Duty on Malt used in making of Spirits from Malt only.	The whole act.
9 Geo. 4. c. 46	Hotel Keepers Act 1828	An Act to enable certain Hotel Keepers to be licensed to keep Hotels as common Inns, Alehouses, and Victualling Houses, and to sell therein Beer and other exciseable Liquors, for the Residue of the present Year.	The whole act.
9 Geo. 4. c. 47	Passage Vessel Licences Act 1828	An Act for regulating the Retail of exciseable Articles and Commodities to Passengers on board of Steam Vessels from one Part to another of the United Kingdom	Section Seven.
9 Geo. 4. c. 50	East India Company (Prize Money) Act 1828	An Act for regulating the Appropriation of certain unclaimed Shares of Prize Money acquired by Soldiers or Seamen in the Service of the East India Company.	The whole act.
9 Geo. 4. c. 53	Criminal Statutes (Ireland) Repeal Act 1828	An Act to repeal several Acts and Parts of Acts in force in Ireland, relating to Bail in Cases of Felony, and to certain Proceedings in Criminal Cases, and to the Benefit of Clergy, and to Larceny and other Offences connected therewith, and to malicious Injuries to Property.	The whole act.
9 Geo. 4. c. 54	Criminal Law (Ireland) Act 1828	An Act for improving the Administration of Justice in Criminal Cases in Ireland	Sections Fourteen and Thirty-one.
9 Geo. 4. c. 58	Licensing (Scotland) Act 1828	An Act for granting Certificates to the Number of Justices of the Peace and Magistrates, authorising Persons to keep common Inns, Alehouses, and Victualling Houses, in Scotland, in which Ale, Beer, Spirits, Wine, and other Exciseable Liquors may be sold by Retail under Excise Licences; and for the better Regulation of such Houses; and for the Prevention of such Houses being kept without such Certificate	Sections One to Four, Ten, and Eighteen. Section Twenty-three from "and all such records" to the end of that Section. Sections Twenty-five, Twenty-six, Thirty-three, Thirty-five, and Thirty-six. The Forms A. B. D. and F. in the Schedule. (Note: This act was partially revived by the Statute Law Revision Act 1878 (41 & 42 Vict. c. 79): "Section Two. Section Three, from 'Provided always,' to the end of that Section. Section Four, from 'Provided always,' to the end of that Section. Section Eighteen. Section Twenty-three, from 'and all such' to the end of that Section. So much of the form in the Schedule, designated by the letter A., as prescribes the form of deliverance at the end of each day's register. So much of the form in the Schedule, designated by the letter D., as prescribes the form of a warrant of imprisonment, and the note to that form.")
9 Geo. 4. c. 61	Alehouse Act 1828	An Act to regulate the granting of Licences to Keepers of Inns, Alehouses, and Victualling Houses, in England	Section Thirty-five. The Schedule.
9 Geo. 4. c. 62	Linen and Hempen Manufacturers Act 1828	An Act for the Regulation of the Linen and Hempen Manufactures of Ireland	Except Sections Thirty-six and Thirty-seven.
9 Geo. 4. c. 66	Nautical Almanack Act 1828	An Act for repealing the Laws now in force relating to the Discovery of the Longitude at Sea.	Section One.
9 Geo. 4. c. 67	Militia Pay Act 1828	An Act the title of which begins with the words,—An Act to defray the Charge,—and ends with the words,—One thousand eight hundred and twenty-nine.	The whole act.
9 Geo. 4. c. 68	Retail Brewers Act 1828	An Act to amend an Act of the Fifth Year of His present Majesty, for amending the Laws of Excise relating to Retail Brewers.	The whole act.
9 Geo. 4. c. 70	Regent Street, etc. Act 1828	An Act the title of which begins with the words,—An Act to alter and enlarge the Powers of an Act passed in the Seventh Year of the Reign of His present Majesty,—and ends with the words,—for other purposes relating thereto.	The whole act.
9 Geo. 4. c. 71	Deputy Warden of the Cinque Ports Act 1828	An Act to empower the Deputy Warden of the Cinque Ports and Lieutenant of Dover Castle to act for the Lord Warden of the Cinque Ports and Constable of Dover Castle during the Indisposition of the present Lord Warden.	The whole act.
9 Geo. 4. c. 74	Criminal Law (India) Act 1828	An Act for improving the Administration of Criminal Justice in the East Indies	The whole Act, except Sections One to Four, Seven to Ten, Thirteen to Fifteen, Twenty-one, Twenty-three to Twenty-six, Thirty-six, Thirty-seven, Fifty-one, Fifty-two, Fifty-five, One hundred and ten. Also so much of Section Fifty-one as relates to Coroners and to Civil Suits. Repealed as to all Her Majesty's Dominions.
9 Geo. 4. c. 77	Turnpike Roads (England) Act 1828	An Act to amend the Acts for regulating Turnpike Roads	Sections One, Three, Four, Six, and Eight.
9 Geo. 4. c. 79	Superannuation, etc. Act 1828	An Act to repeal an Act passed in the Third Year of His present Majesty, for apportioning the Burthen occasioned by the Military and Naval Pensions and Civil Superannuations, by vesting an equal Annuity in Trustees for the Payment thereof.	The whole act.
9 Geo. 4. c. 80	Bankers' Composition (Ireland) Act 1828	An Act to enable Bankers in Ireland to issue certain unstamped Promissory Notes, upon Payment of a Composition in lieu of the Stamp Duties thereon	Sections Fifteen and Eighteen.
9 Geo. 4. c. 82	Lighting of Towns (Ireland) Act 1828	An Act to continue for One Year the Laws for regulating the lighting, cleansing, and watching of Cities, Towns Corporate, and Market Towns in Ireland, in certain Cases	Sections One and Seventy-six.
9 Geo. 4. c. 87	Deserted Children (Ireland) Act 1828	An Act to continue until the Twenty-fifth day of March One thousand eight hundred and twenty-nine, and from thence to the End of the then next Session of Parliament, an Act passed in the Sixth Year of the Reign of His present Majesty, respecting deserted Children in Ireland.	The whole act.
9 Geo. 4. c. 88	Butter Trade (Ireland) Act 1828	An Act to repeal certain Provisions in several Acts relating to the Butter Trade in Ireland.	The whole act.
9 Geo. 4. c. 89	Exchequer Bills Act 1828	An Act for raising the Sum of Sixteen millions and forty-six thousand eight hundred Pounds by Exchequer Bills, for the Service of the Year One thousand eight hundred and twenty-eight.	The whole act.
9 Geo. 4. c. 90	National Debt Reduction Act 1828	An Act to amend the Acts for regulating the Reduction of the National Debt.	The whole act.
9 Geo. 4. c. 92	Savings Bank Act 1828	An Act to consolidate and amend the Laws relating to Savings Banks	Sections One to Fourteen, Sixteen to Twenty-four, and Twenty-six. Section Twenty-eight from " Provided always," to the end of that Section. Sections Thirty-six, Thirty-eight, Thirty-nine, Forty-five to Forty-nine, and Sixty-two.
9 Geo. 4. c. 95	Appropriation Act 1828	An Act to apply the Sums of Money therein mentioned for the Service of the Year One thousand eight hundred and twenty-eight, and to appropriate the Supplies granted in this Session of Parliament.	The whole act.
10 Geo. 4. c. 1	Dangerous Assemblies (Ireland) Act 1829	An Act for the Suppression of dangerous Associations or Assemblies in Ireland.	The whole act.
10 Geo. 4. c. 2	Duties on Personal Estates, etc. Act 1829	An Act for continuing to His Majesty for One Year certain Duties on Personal Estates, Offices, and Pensions in England, for the Service of the Year One thousand eight hundred and twenty-nine.	The whole act.
10 Geo. 4. c. 3	Supply Act 1829	An Act for applying certain Sums of Money for the Service of the Year One thousand eight hundred and twenty-nine.	The whole act.
10 Geo. 4. c. 4	Exchequer Bills Act 1829	An Act for raising the Sum of Twelve Millions by Exchequer Bills, for the Service of the Year One thousand eight hundred and twenty-nine.	The whole act.
10 Geo. 4. c. 5	Marine Mutiny Act 1829	An Act for the regulating of His Majesty's Royal Marine Forces while on Shore.	The whole act.
10 Geo. 4. c. 6	Mutiny Act 1829	An Act for punishing Mutiny and Desertion; and for the better Payment of the Army and their Quarters.	The whole act.
10 Geo. 4. c. 7	Roman Catholic Relief Act 1829	An Act for the Relief of His Majesty's Roman Catholic Subjects	Section Fourteen from "upon taking and subscribing" to "abjuration".
10 Geo. 4. c. 8	Parliamentary Elections (Ireland) Act 1829	An Act to amend certain Acts of the Parliament of Ireland relative to the Election of Members to serve in Parliament, and to regulate the Qualification of Persons entitled to vote at the Election of Knights of the Shire in Ireland.	The whole act.
10 Geo. 4. c. 9	Quartering of Soldiers Act 1829	An Act for fixing, until the Twenty-fifth day of March One thousand eight hundred and thirty, the Rates of Subsistence to be paid to Innkeepers and others on quartering Soldiers.	The whole act.
10 Geo. 4. c. 10	Militia Act 1829	An Act to amend certain Provisions of an Act of the last Session of Parliament in making of Lists and the Ballots and Enrolment for the Militia of the United Kingdom, and to reduce the permanent Staff, and regulate the Allowances of Serjeants hereafter appointed	Sections One and Two.
10 Geo. 4. c. 11	Payment of Creditors (Scotland) Act 1829	An Act to continue, for Two Years, an Act made in the Fifty-fourth Year of the Reign of His late Majesty, for rendering the Payment of Creditors more equal and expeditious in Scotland.	The whole act.
10 Geo. 4. c. 17	Newfoundland Fisheries, etc. Act 1829	An Act to continue, until the Thirty-first Day of December One thousand eight hundred and thirty-two, certain Acts relating to the Island of Newfoundland, and the Fisheries carried on upon the Banks and Shores thereof.	The whole act.
10 Geo. 4. c. 19	Register of Sasines Act 1829	An Act to explain and amend an Act of the Parliament of Scotland, intituled An Act concerning the Registration of Seisins and Reversions of Tenements within Burgh	Section Three.
10 Geo. 4. c. 20	British and Spanish Claims Convention Act 1829	An Act to carry into execution the Stipulations of a Convention between His Majesty and His Catholic Majesty, for the Settlement of certain British Claims upon Spain, and of certain Spanish Claims upon the United Kingdom.	The whole act.
10 Geo. 4. c. 22	Government of Western Australia Act 1829	An Act to provide, until the Thirty-first Day of December One thousand eight hundred and thirty-four, for the Government of His Majesty's Settlements in Western Australia, on the Western Coast of New Holland.	The whole act.
10 Geo. 4. c. 24	Government Annuities Act 1829	An Act to enable the Commissioners for the Reduction of the National Debt to grant Life Annuities and Annuities for Terms of Years	Sections One to Two.
10 Geo. 4. c. 26	Greenwich Hospital Outpensions, etc. Act 1829	An Act for transferring the Management of Greenwich Hospital, and certain Duties in Matters of Prize, to the Treasurer of the Navy	Sections Thirty-three and Thirty-four.
10 Geo. 4. c. 28	Supply (No. 2) Act 1829	An Act to apply a Sum out of the Consolidated Fund and the Surplus of Ways and Means to the Service of the Year One thousand eight hundred and twenty-nine.	The whole act.
10 Geo. 4. c. 29	Militia Pay Act 1829	An Act the title of which begins with the words,—An Act to defray,—and ends with the words,—One thousand eight hundred and thirty.	The whole act.
10 Geo. 4. c. 30	Yeomanry Corps (Ireland) Act 1829	An Act to continue and amend the Laws relating to Yeomanry Corps in Ireland.	The whole act.
10 Geo. 4. c. 32	Excise Act 1829	An Act to enable One or more of the Commissioners of Excise to act for the Dispatch of Business for Scotland and Ireland respectively.	The whole act.
10 Geo. 4. c. 33	Irish Fisheries Act 1829	An Act to amend the several Acts for the Encouragement of the Irish Fisheries.	The whole act.
10 Geo. 4. c. 35	Arrest on Mesne Process (Ireland) Act 1829	An Act to prevent Arrests upon Mesne Process where the Debt or Cause of Action is under Twenty Pounds, and to regulate the Practice of Arrests, in Ireland	Sections One and Two.
10 Geo. 4. c. 36	Insolvent Debtors Relief (Ireland) Act 1829	An Act to continue until the End of the next Session of Parliament, and to amend, the Acts for the Relief of Insolvent Debtors in Ireland.	The whole act.
10 Geo. 4. c. 37	Coroners (Ireland) Act 1829	An Act to amend the Laws relating to Coroners in Ireland	Section Two.
10 Geo. 4. c. 38	Criminal Law (Scotland) Act 1829	An Act for the more effectual Punishment of Attempts to murder in certain Cases in Scotland	Section One.
10 Geo. 4. c. 39	Sugar Duties Act 1829	An Act for continuing to His Majesty, for One Year, certain Duties on Sugar imported into the United Kingdom, for the Service of the Year One thousand eight hundred and twenty-nine.	The whole act.
10 Geo. 4. c. 40	Roads, etc. (Ireland) Act 1829	An Act to continue for One Year, and until the End of the then next Session of Parliament, an Act of the Sixth Year of His present Majesty, for providing for the repairing, maintaining, and keeping in repair certain Roads and Bridges in Ireland.	The whole act.
10 Geo. 4. c. 44	Metropolitan Police Act 1829	An Act for improving the Police in and near the Metropolis	Sections Three, Eight, and Nine. Section Ten the words " inserting the name of the receiver for the time being,". Section Twelve from "the receiver out of the moneys" to "payable quarterly; and". Sections Thirteen and Nineteen to Twenty-one. Section Twenty-nine to "subsequent to the Thirty-first of December". Section Thirty-six. Section Thirty-seven from " and no person " to " mentioned in this Act". Sections Thirty-eight and Thirty-nine. Section Forty to "Westminster", and from "and where any distress" to the end of that Section. Sections Forty-one to Forty-three. (Note: This act was partially revived by the Statute Law Revision Act 1878 (41 & 42 Vict. c. 79): "Section Nine.")
10 Geo. 4. c. 45	Justices of the Peace, Metropolis Act 1829	An Act to continue, until the Fifth Day of July One thousand eight hundred and thirty-two, an Act for the more effectual Administration of the Office of a Justice of the Peace in and near the Metropolis.	The whole act.
10 Geo. 4. c. 47	Arms (Ireland) Act 1829	An Act to continue for One Year, and until the End of the next Session of Parliament, and to amend, Two Acts made in the Forty-seventh and Fiftieth Years of the Reign of His late Majesty King George the Third, for the preventing improper Persons from having Arms in Ireland.	The whole act.
10 Geo. 4. c. 48	Sale, etc., of Certain Stocks Act 1829	An Act to authorize the Sale and Transfer of the Stocks or Funds standing in the Books of the Bank of Ireland on account of the Office of the Clerk of the Hanaper in the Court of Chancery in Ireland, and the Payment and Application of the Produce thereof, for the Purposes of the Consolidated Fund of the United Kingdom.	The whole act.
10 Geo. 4. c. 49	Delivery of Sugar out of Bond Act 1829	An Act to continue until the Fifth Day of July One thousand eight hundred and thirty the Provisions of an Act to allow Sugar to be delivered out of Warehouse to be refined.	The whole act.
10 Geo. 4. c. 50	Crown Lands Act 1829	An Act to consolidate and amend the Laws relating to the Management and Improvement of His Majesty's Woods, Forests, Parks, and Chases; of the Land Revenue of the Crown within the Survey of the Exchequer in England, and of the Land Revenue of the Crown in Ireland; and for extending certain Provisions relating to the same to the Isles of Man and Alderney	Sections One to Four. Section Seven. Section Eight from "and the said Commissioners" to the end of that Section. Sections Nine and Ten. Sections Fifteen and Eighteen to Twenty-one. Section Sixty-three from "until the determination" to "any one of such districts", and from "and until the determination" to the end of that Section. Sections Sixty-four to Sixty-eight, Seventy-five, Seventy-nine, One hundred and fifteen, One hundred and sixteen, and One hundred and Thirty-one.
10 Geo. 4. c. 54	Gaol Reports (Scotland) Act 1829	An Act for directing Reports to be made respecting Gaols in Scotland.	The whole act.
10 Geo. 4. c. 57	Charity Commission Act 1829	An Act to continue until the First Day of July One thousand eight hundred and thirty the Powers of the Commissioners for inquiring concerning Charities in England and Wales.	The whole act.
10 Geo. 4. c. 60	Appropriation Act 1829	An Act for raising the Sum of Thirteen millions four hundred thirty-eight thousand eight hundred Pounds for the Service of the Year One thousand eight hundred and twenty-nine, and to appropriate the Supplies granted in this Session of Parliament.	The whole act.
11 Geo. 4. & 1 Will. 4. c. 1	Transfer of Balance of Fees Act 1830	An Act to authorize the Transfer of certain Balances in the Hands of the Clerks of the Peace of the several Counties of England and Wales on account of Lunatic Asylums Licences.	The whole act.
11 Geo. 4. & 1 Will. 4. c. 2	Supply Act 1830	An Act to apply certain Sums of Money, out of the Consolidated Fund, and from the Aids granted for the Year One thousand eight hundred and twenty-nine, to the Service of the Year One thousand eight hundred and thirty.	The whole act.
11 Geo. 4. & 1 Will. 4. c. 3	Exchequer Bills Act 1830	An Act for raising the Sum of Twelve Millions by Exchequer Bills, for the Service of the Year One thousand eight hundred and thirty.	The whole act.
11 Geo. 4. & 1 Will. 4. c. 4	Supply (No. 2) Act 1830	An Act for appropriating certain Sums to the Service of the Year One thousand eight hundred and thirty.	The whole act.
11 Geo. 4. & 1 Will. 4. c. 6	Duties on Personal Estates, etc. Act 1830	An Act for continuing to His Majesty for One Year certain Duties on Personal Estates, Offices, and Pensions in England, for the Service of the Year One thousand eight hundred and thirty.	The whole act.
11 Geo. 4. & 1 Will. 4. c. 7	Mutiny Act 1830	An Act for punishing Mutiny and Desertion; and for the better Payment of the Army and their Quarters.	The whole act.
11 Geo. 4. & 1 Will. 4. c. 8	Marine Mutiny Act 1830	An Act for the Regulation of His Majesty's Royal Marine Forces while on Shore.	The whole act.
11 Geo. 4. & 1 Will. 4. c. 12	East Retford Election Act 1830	An Act to indemnify Witnesses who may give Evidence, before the Lords Spiritual and Temporal, on a Bill to prevent Bribery and Corruption in the Election of Burgesses to serve in Parliament for the Borough of East Retford.	The whole act.
11 Geo. 4. & 1 Will. 4. c. 15	Northern Lighthouses Act 1830	An Act for relieving, in certain Cases, Vessels entering or sailing from the Port of Liverpool, from the Duties levied under Two Acts passed in the Forty-sixth and Fifty-fourth Years of His late Majesty's Reign, relating to the Northern Lighthouses.	The whole act.
11 Geo. 4. & 1 Will. 4. c. 16	Leather Duties Repeal Act 1830	An Act to repeal the Duties of Excise and Drawbacks on Leather, and the Laws relating thereto.	The whole act.
11 Geo. 4. & 1 Will. 4. c. 17	Excise Laws Relating to Malt Act 1830	An Act to alter and amend an Act of the Seventh and Eighth Years of His present Majesty, for consolidating and amending the Laws relating to the Duties of Excise on Malt made in the United Kingdom, and for amending the Laws relating to Brewers in Ireland, and the Allowance of Malt Allowance on Spirits in Scotland and Ireland	Sections Five, Six, Nine to Twelve, Fifteen, Twenty, Twenty-five to Twenty-seven, Twenty-seven to Thirty-four, Thirty-six, Forty, and Forty-one.
11 Geo. 4. & 1 Will. 4. c. 19	Fever Hospitals (Ireland) Act 1830	An Act to extend the Powers of Grand Juries in the Execution of an Act of the Fifty-eighth Year of His late Majesty's Reign, for establishing Fever Hospitals in Ireland	The whole Act, except as to the County of the City of Dublin.
11 Geo. 4. & 1 Will. 4. c. 21	Linen Manufacture (Ireland) Act 1830	An Act to confirm certain Leases of Lands for the Purposes of carrying on the Linen Manufacture of Ireland.	The whole act.
11 Geo. 4. & 1 Will. 4. c. 22	Richmond Lunatic Asylum Act 1830	An Act for appropriating the Richmond Lunatic Asylum in Dublin to the Purposes of a District Lunatic Asylum	Section One.
11 Geo. 4. & 1 Will. 4. c. 23	Royal Signature by Commission Act 1830	An Act to enable His Majesty to appoint certain Persons to affix His Majesty's Royal Signature to Instruments requiring such Signature.	The whole act.
11 Geo. 4. & 1 Will. 4. c. 25	Criminal Returns Act 1830	An Act to repeal an Act of the Fifty-fifth Year of His late Majesty, for procuring Returns of Persons committed, tried, and convicted for Criminal Offences and Misdemeanors.	The whole act.
11 Geo. 4. & 1 Will. 4. c. 26	National Debt Act 1830	An Act to authorize the issuing of Exchequer Bills for the Payment of the Proprietors of Four Pounds per Centum Annuities in England and Ireland who have signified their Dissent under an Act of the present Session for granting such Proprietors the Option of receiving Three Pounds Ten Shillings per Centum Annuities in lieu thereof	Sections One to Five.
11 Geo. 4. & 1 Will. 4. c. 28	Supply Act 1830	An Act to apply a certain Sum of Money out of the Consolidated Fund to the Service of the Year One thousand eight hundred and thirty.	The whole act.
11 Geo. 4. & 1 Will. 4. c. 29	Militia Ballots Suspension Act 1830	An Act to suspend, until the End of the next Session of Parliament, the making of Lists and the Ballots and Enrolments for the Militia of the United Kingdom.	The whole act.
11 Geo. 4. & 1 Will. 4. c. 30	Census (Great Britain) Act 1830	An Act for taking an Account of the Population of Great Britain, and of the Increase or Diminution thereof.	The whole act.
11 Geo. 4. & 1 Will. 4. c. 31	Malt Duty (Ireland) Act 1830	An Act for reducing the Duty on Malt made from Bear or Bigg only, in Ireland, to the same Duty as is now payable thereon in Scotland	Sections Three and Five.
11 Geo. 4. & 1 Will. 4. c. 32	Banks (Ireland) Act 1830	An Act to amend an Act of His present Majesty for establishing an Agreement with the Governor and Company of the Bank of Ireland, for advancing the Sum of Five hundred thousand Pounds, Irish Currency, and for the better Regulation of Copartnerships of certain Bankers in Ireland	Sections Two to Five.
11 Geo. 4. & 1 Will. 4. c. 33	Insolvent Debtors (Ireland) Act 1830	An Act to continue for One Year, and from thence until the End of the then next Session of Parliament, the Acts for the Relief of Insolvent Debtors in Ireland.	The whole act.
11 Geo. 4. & 1 Will. 4. c. 36	Contempt of Court Act 1830	An Act for altering and amending the Law regarding Commitments by Courts of Equity for Contempts, and the taking Bills pro Confesso	Section One.
11 Geo. 4. & 1 Will. 4. c. 37	Criminal Law (Scotland) Act 1830	An Act to amend an Act of the Ninth Year of His late Majesty King George the Fourth, to facilitate Criminal Trials in Scotland, and to abridge the Statements now required between the Pronouncing and Executing Sentences thereof, in Cases importing a Capital Punishment	Section One.
11 Geo. 4. & 1 Will. 4. c. 38	Insolvent Debtors (England) Act 1830	An Act to continue and amend the Laws for the Relief of Insolvent Debtors in England.	The whole act.
11 Geo. 4. & 1 Will. 4. c. 39	Transportation Act 1830	An Act to amend an Act of the Fifth Year of His present Majesty, for the Transportation of Offenders from Great Britain; and for punishing Offences committed by Transports kept to labour in the Colonies	Section Eight.
11 Geo. 4. & 1 Will. 4. c. 41	Army Pensions Act 1830	An Act to make further Regulations with respect to Army Pensions	Sections One and Six.
11 Geo. 4. & 1 Will. 4. c. 42	Treasurer of the Navy Act 1830	An Act to consolidate and amend the several Acts relating to the Office of Treasurer of His Majesty's Navy	Section One.
11 Geo. 4. & 1 Will. 4. c. 47	Debts Recovery Act 1830	An Act for consolidating and amending the Laws for facilitating the Payment of Debts out of Real Estate	Section One.
11 Geo. 4. & 1 Will. 4. c. 50	Sugar Duties Act 1830	An Act for granting to His Majesty, until the Fifth Day of April One thousand eight hundred and thirty-one, certain Duties on Sugar imported into the United Kingdom, for the Service of the Year One thousand eight hundred and thirty.	The whole act.
11 Geo. 4. & 1 Will. 4. c. 51	Beer Licences Act 1830	An Act to repeal certain of the Duties on Cider in the United Kingdom, and on Plant and on Wood Ash in Great Britain, and to make other Provisions in relation thereto	Sections One, Two, Five, Six, Eighteen to Twenty-one, and Twenty-five.
11 Geo. 4. & 1 Will. 4. c. 52	Militia Pay Act 1830	An Act the title of which begins with the words,—An Act to defray,—and ends with the words,—One thousand eight hundred and thirty-one.	The whole act.
11 Geo. 4. & 1 Will. 4. c. 54	Fisheries (Scotland) Act 1830	An Act to revise, continue, and amend several Acts relating to Sea Fisheries	Section Four, and Section Six to end of Act.
11 Geo. 4. & 1 Will. 4. c. 58	Common Law Courts (England) Act 1830	An Act for regulating the Receipt and future Appropriation of Fees and Emoluments receivable by Officers in the Superior Courts of Common Law	Sections One and Two.
11 Geo. 4. & 1 Will. 4. c. 61	County Cess. (Ireland) Act 1830	An Act to regulate the Appointment of County Rates and Cesses in Ireland, in certain Cases.	The whole act.
11 Geo. 4. & 1 Will. 4. c. 62	Exchequer Bills Act 1830	An Act for raising the Sum of Thirteen millions six hundred and seven thousand six hundred Pounds by Exchequer Bills, for the Service of the Year One thousand eight hundred and thirty.	The whole act.
11 Geo. 4. & 1 Will. 4. c. 63	Appropriation Act 1830	An Act to apply the Sum of one million five hundred thousand Pounds out of the Consolidated Fund to the Service of the Year One thousand eight hundred and thirty; and to appropriate the Supplies granted in this Session of Parliament.	The whole act.
11 Geo. 4. & 1 Will. 4. c. 64	Beerhouse Act 1830	An Act to permit the general Sale of Beer and Cyder by Retail in England	Section Two from "together with the Christian names" to "sureties for the party so to be licensed"; from "within ten days" to "and of execution of such bond"; the words "and shall expire"; from "and the said license shall be dated"; the words "shall be according to the form in the schedule annexed to this Act, and"; from "nor to act" to "license, unless"; and from "nor unless" to "of his sureties respectively". So much of Section Thirty as incorporates or applies any repealed enactment. The Schedule.
11 Geo. 4. & 1 Will. 4. c. 65	Infants' Property Act 1830	An Act for consolidating and amending the Laws relating to Property belonging to Infants, Femes Covert, Idiots, Lunatics, and Persons of unsound Mind	Sections Two and Three. Sections Thirteen and Nineteen. Section Twenty-one from "if such renewal should" to the end of that Section. Sections Twenty-three to Twenty-five. Section Twenty-six from "and the committee" to the end of that Section. Sections Twenty-seven to Thirty, Thirty-three, Thirty-four, and Forty to Forty-two. Also so much of the Act as relates to or affects idiots, lunatics, or persons of unsound mind; and so much thereof as relates to Ireland.
11 Geo. 4. & 1 Will. 4. c. 69	Court of Session Act 1830	An Act for altering the Practice of entering up Judgment in Civil Causes with the ordinary Jurisdiction of the Court of Session, and of the Courts of the Lords Commissioners for Teinds, in Scotland; and for making Additions and Alterations in the Judicial Establishments of that Part of the United Kingdom	Section One from "Provided always," to "Lord President". Section Three from "Provided always," to "Lords Commissioners of the Jury Court shall be". Section Four from "from and after" to "all and events". Section Four. Section Six from "Provided always," to the end of that Section. Section Eight. Section Ten from "and for the information" to the end of that Section. Sections Twelve, Seventeen, Twenty-five, Twenty-six, Thirty from "so much of an Act" to "repealed, and", "thirtieth day of July", Thirty-five, Thirty-eight, Forty to Forty-three, Forty-five, and Schedule.
11 Geo. 4. & 1 Will. 4. c. 70	Law Terms Act 1830	An Act for the more effectual Administration of Justice in England and Wales	Sections Two, Five, Ten, Fourteen, Sixteen to Eighteen, Twenty-three to Twenty-six, Twenty-eight to Thirty, Thirty-four, and Thirty-six to end of Act.
11 Geo. 4. & 1 Will. 4. c. 72	Delivery of Sugar out of Bond Act 1830	An Act to allow, before the Fifth Day of July One thousand eight hundred and thirty-one, certain Bounties on Sugar refined in the United Kingdom.	The whole act.
11 Geo. 4. & 1 Will. 4. c. 75	Supreme Court, Madras Act 1830	An Act for the Relief of the Sufferers by the Insolvency of Gilbert Ricketts, Esquire, formerly Registrar of the Supreme Court of Judicature at Madras.	The whole act.

== See also ==
- Statute Law Revision Act
