= Insolvent Debtors (England) Act 1826 =

Act of the Parliament of the United Kingdom

- Act of Parliament
- Parliament of the United Kingdom
- Long title: An Act to amend and consolidate the Laws for the Relief of Insolvent Debtors in England.
- Citation: 7 Geo. 4. c. 57
- Territorial extent: United Kingdom

Dates
- Royal assent: 26 May 1826
- Commencement: 26 May 1826 (Note: The Acts of Parliament (Commencement) Act 1793.)
- Expired: 1 June 1829 (and thereafter until the end of the next session of Parliament) (Note: Section 91.)
- Repealed: 5 August 1873
Other legislation
Repeals/revokes	See § Repealed enactments
Repealed by	Statute Law Revision Act 1873

Status: Repealed

Text of statute as originally enacted

The Insolvent Debtors (England) Act 1826 (7 Geo. 4. c. 57) was an act of the Parliament of the United Kingdom that consolidated enactments related to insolvent debtors in England.

== Provisions ==
=== Repealed enactments ===
Section 1 of the act repealed 3 enactments, listed in that section. The repeal did not affect the continuation, by that section, of the powers given by the repealed acts to the court established under the first of them, in so far as they related to the petitions of persons who had petitioned that court for relief before the passing of the act, or of persons who had obtained their discharge under the Insolvent Debtors (England) Act 1813 (53 Geo. 3. c. 102).

Citation	Short title	Description	Extent of repeal
1 Geo. 4. c. 119	Relief of Insolvent Debtors Act 1820	An Act for the Relief of Insolvent Debtors in England; to continue in force until the First Day of June One thousand eight hundred and twenty five.	The whole act.
3 Geo. 4. c. 123	Insolvent Debtors (England) Act 1822	An Act to amend an Act of the First Year of His present Majesty, for the Relief of Insolvent Debtors in England.	The whole act.
5 Geo. 4. c. 61	Insolvent Debtors (England) Act 1824	An Act to amend certain Acts for the Relief of Insolvent Debtors in England.	The whole act.

== Subsequent developments ==
The whole act was repealed by section 1 of, and the schedule to, the Statute Law Revision Act 1873 (36 & 37 Vict. c. 91), which came into force on 5 August 1873.
