= Trade in Spirits Act 1820 =

Act of the Parliament of the United Kingdom

- Act of Parliament
- Parliament of the United Kingdom
- Long title: An Act to continue, until the Fifth Day of July One thousand eight hundred and twenty-five, several Acts for regulating the Trade in Spirits between Great Britain and Ireland reciprocally, to consolidate the countervailing Excise Duties payable on the Importation of Irish Spirits into Great Britain, and to amend the countervailing Excise Duties paid on the Importation of Irish Spirits from Scotland.
- Citation: 1 Geo. 4. c. 77
- Territorial extent: United Kingdom

Dates
- Royal assent: 24 July 1820
- Commencement: 24 July 1820 (Note: The Acts of Parliament (Commencement) Act 1793.)
- Repealed: 5 August 1873
Other legislation
Amends	Spirit Trade Act 1814; Excise Act 1819; Excise (No. 5) Act 1819
Repealed by	Statute Law Revision Act 1873
Relates to	Trade in Spirits Act 1816

Status: Repealed

Text of statute as originally enacted

The Trade in Spirits Act 1820 (1 Geo. 4. c. 77) was an act of the Parliament of the United Kingdom that continued several earlier acts regulating the reciprocal trade in spirits between Great Britain and Ireland, and consolidated the countervailing excise duties charged on spirits moving between Great Britain, Ireland and Scotland.

== Provisions ==
Section 1 of the act continued the Spirit Trade Act 1814 (54 Geo. 3. c. 149), as continued by the Trade in Spirits Act 1816 (56 Geo. 3. c. 105) from 5 July 1820 until 5 July 1825.

Section 2 repealed the additional countervailing duties on Irish spirits imported into England and Scotland imposed by the Excise Act 1819 (59 Geo. 3. c. 53) and the Excise (No. 5) Act 1819 (59 Geo. 3. c. 105), from 5 July 1820, substituting new, consolidated countervailing duties on Irish spirits imported or brought into Great Britain, calculated by reference to the strength of the spirits.

== Subsequent developments ==
The whole act was repealed by section 1 of, and the schedule to, the Statute Law Revision Act 1873 (36 & 37 Vict. c. 91), which came into force on 5 August 1873.
