= Duties on Spirits etc. (Scotland) Act 1820 =

Act of the Parliament of the United Kingdom

- Act of Parliament
- Parliament of the United Kingdom
- Long title: An Act to grant certain Duties in Scotland upon Wash and Spirits made from Corn or Grain, and upon Licences for making and keeping of Stills; and to consolidate and amend the Laws for the Distillation of such Spirits for Home Consumption; and for better preventing private Distillation in Scotland.
- Citation: 1 Geo. 4. c. 74
- Territorial extent: United Kingdom

Dates
- Royal assent: 24 July 1820
- Commencement: 10 November 1820 (Note: Section 127.)
- Expired: 10 November 1822
- Repealed: 5 August 1873
Other legislation
Amends	See § Repealed enactments
Repeals/revokes	See § Repealed enactments
Repealed by	Statute Law Revision Act 1873

Status: Repealed

Text of statute as originally enacted

The Duties on Spirits etc. (Scotland) Act 1820 (1 Geo. 4. c. 74) was an act of the Parliament of the United Kingdom that consolidated enactments related to the distillation of spirits in Scotland.

== Provisions ==
Section 1 of the act repealed "all and singular the Rules Regulations Restrictions and Provisions for the Ex traction Manufacture Distillation Rectification and Compound ing of Spirits from Corn or Grain malted or unmalted for Home Consumption in Scotland and all and singular the Distinctions Limitations and Restrictions between the Highland and Lowland and intermediate Districts in Scotland as described in any Act or Acts of Parliament relating to the Distilleries in Scotland in force immediately before the passing of this Act".

== Subsequent developments ==
The whole act was repealed by section 1 of, and the schedule to, the Statute Law Revision Act 1873 (36 & 37 Vict. c. 91), which came into force on 5 August 1873.
