= List of acts of the Parliament of the United Kingdom from 1820 =

This is a complete list of acts of the Parliament of the United Kingdom for the year 1820.

Note that the first parliament of the United Kingdom was held in 1801; parliaments between 1707 and 1800 were either parliaments of Great Britain or of Ireland). For acts passed up until 1707, see the list of acts of the Parliament of England and the list of acts of the Parliament of Scotland. For acts passed from 1707 to 1800, see the list of acts of the Parliament of Great Britain. See also the list of acts of the Parliament of Ireland.

For acts of the devolved parliaments and assemblies in the United Kingdom, see the list of acts of the Scottish Parliament, the list of acts of the Northern Ireland Assembly, and the list of acts and measures of Senedd Cymru; see also the list of acts of the Parliament of Northern Ireland.

The number shown after each act's title is its chapter number. Acts passed before 1963 are cited using this number, preceded by the year(s) of the reign during which the relevant parliamentary session was held; thus the Union with Ireland Act 1800 is cited as "39 & 40 Geo. 3 c. 67", meaning the 67th act passed during the session that started in the 39th year of the reign of George III and which finished in the 40th year of that reign. Note that the modern convention is to use Arabic numerals in citations (thus "41 Geo. 3" rather than "41 Geo. III"). Acts of the last session of the Parliament of Great Britain and the first session of the Parliament of the United Kingdom are both cited as "41 Geo. 3". Acts passed from 1963 onwards are simply cited by calendar year and chapter number.

All modern acts have a short title, e.g. the Local Government Act 2003. Some earlier acts also have a short title given to them by later acts, such as by the Short Titles Act 1896.

== 60 Geo. 3 & 1 Geo. 4 ==
Continuing the second session of the 6th Parliament of the United Kingdom, which met from 23 November 1819 until 28 February 1820.

This session was also traditionally cited as 60 G. 3. & 1 G. 4.

=== Public general acts ===
Short title	Citation	Royal assent
Long title
Indemnity Act 1820 (Note: This was the first act of the reign of King George VI.) (repealed)	60 Geo. 3 & 1 Geo. 4. c. 10	28 February 1820
An Act to indemnify such Persons in the United Kingdom as have omitted to qualify themselves for Offices and Employments, and for extending the Time limited for certain of those Purposes respectively, until the Twenty fifth Day of March One thousand eight hundred and twenty one; and to permit such Persons in Great Britain as have omitted to make and file Affidavits of the Execution of Indentures of Clerks to Attorneys and Solicitors, to make and file the same on or before the First Day of Hilary Term One thou sand eight hundred and twenty one, and to allow Persons to make and file such Affidavits, although the Persons whom they served shall have neglected to take out their Annual Certificates. (Repealed by Promissory Oaths Act 1871 (34 & 35 Vict. c. 48))
Parliamentary Elections (Ireland) Act 1820 (repealed)	60 Geo. 3 & 1 Geo. 4. c. 11	28 February 1820
An Act for the better Regulation of Polls, and for making further Provision touching the Election of Members to serve in Parliament for Ireland. (Repealed by Representation of the People Act 1948 (11 & 12 Geo. 6. c. 65))
Expiring Laws Continuance Act 1820 (repealed)	60 Geo. 3 & 1 Geo. 4. c. 12	28 February 1820
An Act to continue until the Twenty fifth Day of June One thousand eight hundred and twenty, such Laws as may expire within a limited Period. (Repealed by Statute Law Revision Act 1873 (36 & 37 Vict. c. 91))
Mutiny Act Continuance Act 1820 (repealed)	60 Geo. 3 & 1 Geo. 4. c. 13	28 February 1820
An Act for continuing an Act made in the last Session of Parliament, intituled "An Act for punishing Mutiny and Desertion and for the better Payment of the Army and their Quarters." (Note: Mutiny Act 1819 (59 Geo. 3. c. 9)) (Repealed by Statute Law Revision Act 1873 (36 & 37 Vict. c. 91))
Local Jurisdictions Act 1820 (repealed)	60 Geo. 3 & 1 Geo. 4. c. 14	28 February 1820
An Act to remedy certain Inconveniences in local and exclusive Jurisdictions. (Repealed by Statute Law Revision Act 1873 (36 & 37 Vict. c. 91))

=== Local acts ===
Short title	Citation	Royal assent
Long title
Liverpool Church Act 1820	60 Geo. 3 & 1 Geo. 4. c. ii	28 February 1820
An Act for regulating and supporting a new Church or Chapel within the Town of Liverpool, in the County Palatine of Lancaster, and for the Solemnization of Marriages therein.
River Lea Bridge and Roads Act 1820 (repealed)	60 Geo. 3 & 1 Geo. 4. c. iii	28 February 1820
An Act to continue and amend several Acts for building a Bridge over the River Lea, at Jeremy's Ferry, and for repairing Roads from thence into the great Roads at Snaresbrooke, in the County of Essex, and at Clapton, in the County of Middlesex. (Repealed by Metropolis Roads Act 1826 (7 Geo. 4. c. cxlii))
Dumfries Turnpike Roads Act 1820 (repealed)	60 Geo. 3 & 1 Geo. 4. c. iv	28 February 1820
An Act to amend an Act made in the Fifty ninth Year of His late Majesty, (Note: Roads in Dumfries Act 1819 (59 Geo. 3. c. cx)) for making and maintaining certain Turnpike Roads within the County of Dumfries, and the other Highways, Bridges and Ferries therein; and for more effectually converting into Money the Statute Labour in the said County. (Repealed by Roads in Dumfries Act 1829 (10 Geo. 4. c. cxi))
Buildwas Bridge and Tern Bridge Road Act 1820 (repealed)	60 Geo. 3 & 1 Geo. 4. c. v	28 February 1820
An Act for enlarging the Term and Powers of Two Acts of His late Majesty, (Note: Salop Roads Act 1778 (18 Geo. 3. c. 88)) (Note: Watling Street Turnpike Road Act 1799 (39 Geo. 3. c. 16)) for repairing the Road from Buildwas Bridge, to join the Watling Street Road, at Tern Bridge, in the County of Salop. (Repealed by Statute Law (Repeals) Act 2013 (c. 2))
Much Wenlock and Gleeton Hill and Cressage Roads Act 1820	60 Geo. 3 & 1 Geo. 4. c. vi	28 February 1820
An Act for enlarging the Term and Powers of several Acts of King George the Second and His late Majesty, for repairing several Roads leading from the Market House in the Town of Much Wenlock, and from Gleeton Hill to Cressage, in the County of Salop.

=== Private acts ===
Short title	Citation	Royal assent
Long title
Hinxton Inclosure Act 1820 (Note: This act was not printed by the King's Printer.)	60 Geo. 3 & 1 Geo. 4. c. 3 Pr.	28 February 1820
An Act for inclosing and exonerating from Tithes Lands in the Parish of Hinxton in the County of Cambridge.

=== Sources ===
- "60° Geo. III. & 1° Geo. IV.". The Statutes of the United Kingdom of Great Britain and Ireland, 60 Geo. III. & 1 Geo. IV. 1819-1820. And 1 Geo. IV. 1820. London. 1820. pp. 1–67 – via Google Books.
- Journals of the House of Commons. Vol. 75: Sess. 1819-20 and 1820. London: His Majesty's Stationery Office. pp. 89–104 – via Google Books.
- Chronological Table of and Index to the Statutes. Vol. 1: To the End of the Session 59 Vict. Sess. 2 (1895) (13th ed.). London: Her Majesty's Stationery Office. 1896. pp. 226–227 – via Google Books.

== 1 Geo. 4 ==
The first session of the 7th Parliament of the United Kingdom which met from 21 April 1820 until 23 November 1820.

This session was also traditionally cited as 1 G. 4.

=== Public general acts ===
Short title	Citation	Royal assent
Long title
Civil List Act 1820 (repealed)	1 Geo. 4. c. 1	6 June 1820
An Act for the Support of His Majesty's Household and of the Honour and Dignity of the Crown of the United Kingdom of Great Britain and Ireland. (Repealed by Statute Law Revision Act 1873 (36 & 37 Vict. c. 91))
South Sea Company Act 1820 (repealed)	1 Geo. 4. c. 2	6 June 1820
An Act to enable His Majesty to be Governor of the South Sea Company. (Repealed by Statute Law Revision Act 1873 (36 & 37 Vict. c. 91))
Insolvent Debtors' Act 1820 or the Insolvent Debtors (England) Act 1820 (repealed)	1 Geo. 4. c. 3	6 June 1820
An Act for the Removal of Doubts as to the Continuance of Three Acts (Note: Insolvent Debtors (England) Act 1813 (53 Geo. 3. c. 102)) (Note: Insolvent Debtors Relief (England) Act 1813 (54 Geo. 3. c. 28)) (Note: Insolvent Debtors (England) Act 1816 (56 Geo. 3. c. 102)) for the Relief of Insolvent Debtors in England. (Repealed by Statute Law Revision Act 1873 (36 & 37 Vict. c. 91))
Stage Coaches (Scotland) Act 1820 (repealed)	1 Geo. 4. c. 4	6 June 1820
An Act for punishing criminally Drivers of Stage Coaches and Carriages for Accidents occasioned by their wilful Misconduct. (Repealed by Statute Law Revision Act 1958 (6 & 7 Eliz. 2. c. 46))
Transfer of Stock (Ireland) Act 1820 (repealed)	1 Geo. 4. c. 5	6 June 1820
An Act to enable Courts of Equity in Ireland to compel a Transfer of Stock in Suits, without making the Governor and Company of the Bank of Ireland, or any Canal Company, Party thereto. (Repealed by Judicature (Northern Ireland) Act 1978 (c. 23))
Glebe Exchange Act 1820 (repealed)	1 Geo. 4. c. 6	6 June 1820
An Act to amend and render more effectual an Act, passed in the Fifty fifth Year of His late Majesty's Reign, (Note: Glebe Exchange Act 1815 (55 Geo. 3. c. 147)) for enabling Spiritual Persons to exchange their Parsonage Houses or Glebe Lands, and for other Purposes therein mentioned. (Repealed by Endowments and Glebe Measure 1976 (No. 4))
Customs Act 1820 (repealed)	1 Geo. 4. c. 7	22 June 1820
An Act to repeal so much of several Acts as requires Bonds to be given to His Majesty in certain Cases, and the taking of certain Oaths in Matters relating to the Revenue of Customs, and to prevent Fees being offered or given to Officers and other Persons in the Service of the Customs. (Repealed by Customs Law Repeal Act 1825 (6 Geo. 4. c. 105))
Customs (No. 2) Act 1820 (repealed)	1 Geo. 4. c. 8	22 June 1820
An Act to allow a Drawback on Goods Wares and Merchandise imported into any British Colony or Plantation in America, on the Exportation thereof to any Foreign Country to which they may be legally exported. (Repealed by Customs Law Repeal Act 1825 (6 Geo. 4. c. 105))
Vessels Built at Malta etc. Act 1820 (repealed)	1 Geo. 4. c. 9	22 June 1820
An Act for granting the Privileges of British Ships to Vessels built at Malta, Gibraltar and Heligoland, and certain of those Privileges to Vessels built in the British Settlements at Honduras. (Repealed by Statute Law Revision Act 1861 (24 & 25 Vict. c. 101))
Supply Act 1820 (repealed)	1 Geo. 4. c. 10	22 June 1820
An Act for applying certain Monies therein mentioned for the Service of the Year One thousand eight hundred and twenty. (Repealed by Statute Law Revision Act 1873 (36 & 37 Vict. c. 91))
Cape of Good Hope etc. Trade Act 1820 (repealed)	1 Geo. 4. c. 11	22 June 1820
An Act to continue, until the Fifth Day of July One thousand eight hundred and twenty five, an Act of the Fifty seventh Year of His late Majesty, (Note: Cape of Good Hope, etc. Trade Act 1817 (57 Geo. 3. c. 1)) for regulating the Trade and Commerce to and from The Cape of Good Hope, and for regulating the Trade of the Island of Mauritius. (Repealed by Statute Law Revision Act 1873 (36 & 37 Vict. c. 91))
Importation etc. (Jamaica) Act 1820 (repealed)	1 Geo. 4. c. 12	22 June 1820
An Act to extend several Acts for allowing the Importation and Exportation of certain Goods and Merchandise to Morant Bay, in the Island of Jamaica. (Repealed by Trade Act 1822 (3 Geo. 4. c. 44))
National Debt Act 1820 (repealed)	1 Geo. 4. c. 13	22 June 1820
An Act for funding Exchequer Bills to a certain Amount, and for raising a Sum of Money by way of Annuities, for the Service of the Year One thousand eight hundred and twenty. (Repealed by Statute Law Revision Act 1870 (33 & 34 Vict. c. 69))
Gold Plate (Exportation) Act 1820 (repealed)	1 Geo. 4. c. 14	22 June 1820
An Act to repeal the Drawback on certain Gold Articles exported; and to permit the Exportation of Cordage, entitled to Bounty, free from Right of Preemption by the Commissioners of the Navy. (Repealed by Customs and Inland Revenue Act 1890 (53 & 54 Vict. c. 8))
Flax etc. Manufacture (Great Britain) Act 1820 (repealed)	1 Geo. 4. c. 15	22 June 1820
An Act to continue, until the Twenty fifth Day of July One thousand eight hundred and twenty one, an Act of the Twenty eighth Year of His late Majesty, (Note: Continuance of Laws Act 1788 (28 Geo. 3. c. 23)) for the more effectual Encouragement of the Manufacture of Flax and Cotton in Great Britain. (Repealed by Statute Law Revision Act 1873 (36 & 37 Vict. c. 91))
Duties on Glass Act 1820 (repealed)	1 Geo. 4. c. 16	22 June 1820
An Act to continue, until the Twenty fifth Day of July One thousand eight hundred and twenty one, an Act of the Fifty ninth Year of His late Majesty, (Note: Excise (No. 4) Act 1819 (59 Geo. 3. c. 104)) to continue certain Laws of Excise with regard to Crown Glass and Flint and Phial Glass, and to alter certain Laws with regard to Flint Glass. (Repealed by Statute Law Revision Act 1873 (36 & 37 Vict. c. 91))
National Debt (No. 2) Act 1820 (repealed)	1 Geo. 4. c. 17	22 June 1820
An Act for raising the Sum of Five Millions by way of Annuities. (Repealed by Statute Law Revision Act 1870 (33 & 34 Vict. c. 69))
Aliens Act 1820 (repealed)	1 Geo. 4. c. 18	22 June 1820
An Act for further continuing, until the Twenty fifth Day of March One thousand eight hundred and twenty two, an Act of the Fifty eighth Year of His late Majesty, (Note: Aliens (No. 2) Act 1818 (58 Geo. 3. c. 97)) for preventing Aliens from becoming naturalised, or being made or becoming Denizens, except in certain Cases. (Repealed by Statute Law Revision Act 1873 (36 & 37 Vict. c. 91))
Mutiny Act 1820 (repealed)	1 Geo. 4. c. 19	22 June 1820
An Act for punishing Mutiny and Desertion; and for the better Payment of the Army and their Quarters. (Repealed by Statute Law Revision Act 1873 (36 & 37 Vict. c. 91))
Marine Mutiny Act 1820 (repealed)	1 Geo. 4. c. 20	23 June 1820
An Act for the regulating of His Majesty's Royal Marine Forces while on Shore. (Repealed by Statute Law Revision Act 1873 (36 & 37 Vict. c. 91))
Nisi Prius Act 1820 (repealed)	1 Geo. 4. c. 21	23 June 1820
An Act to enable the Chief Justice of the King's Bench, or in his Absence any Judge of the same Court, to try Middlesex Issues at Nisi Prius elsewhere than in Westminster Hall. (Repealed by Civil Procedure Acts Repeal Act 1879 (42 & 43 Vict. c. 59))
National Debt (No. 3) Act 1820 (repealed)	1 Geo. 4. c. 22	30 June 1820
An Act for raising a Loan of Twelve Millions from the Commissioners for the Reduction of the National Debt. (Repealed by Statute Law Revision Act 1861 (24 & 25 Vict. c. 101))
National Debt (No. 4) Act 1820 (repealed)	1 Geo. 4. c. 23	30 June 1820
An Act to provide for the Charge of the Addition to the Public Funded Debt of Great Britain, for the Service of the Year One thousand eight hundred and twenty. (Repealed by Statute Law Revision Act 1870 (33 & 34 Vict. c. 69))
Peace Preservation Act 1820 (repealed)	1 Geo. 4. c. 24	30 June 1820
An Act to amend and continue, until the Twentieth Day of June One thousand eight hundred and twenty four, an Act of the Fifty second Year of His late Majesty, (Note: Manufacture of Sail Cloth Act 1735 (52 Geo. 3. c. 17)) for the more effectual Preservation of the Peace, by enforcing the Duties of Watching and Warding. (Repealed by Statute Law Revision Act 1873 (36 & 37 Vict. c. 91))
Manufacture of Sail Cloth Act 1820 (repealed)	1 Geo. 4. c. 25	30 June 1820
An Act to repeal Part of an Act, made in the Ninth Year of the Reign of His late Majesty King George the Second, (Note: Manufacture of Sail Cloth Act 1735 (9 Geo. 2. c. 37)) relative to the Manufacture of Sail Cloth. (Repealed by Statute Law Revision Act 1873 (36 & 37 Vict. c. 91))
Coasting Trade (Ireland) Act 1820 (repealed)	1 Geo. 4. c. 26	30 June 1820
An Act for the Encouragement and Improvement of the Coasting Trade of Ireland. (Repealed by Statute Law Revision Act 1861 (24 & 25 Vict. c. 101))
Clerks of the Peace (Ireland) Act 1820 (repealed)	1 Geo. 4. c. 27	30 June 1820
An Act to regulate the Appointment and Tenure of the Office of Clerk of the Peace in Ireland. (Repealed by County Officers and Courts (Ireland) Act 1877 (40 & 41 Vict. c. 56))
Coroners' Fees (Ireland) Act 1820 (repealed)	1 Geo. 4. c. 28	30 June 1820
An Act to repeal an Act made in the Fiftieth Year of the Reign of His late Majesty, (Note: Fees of Coroners (Ireland) Act 1810 (50 Geo. 3. c. 30)) for regulating the Fees of Coroners in Ireland, upon holding Inquisitions, and to make other Provisions for that Purpose. (Repealed by Coroners (Ireland) Act 1846 (9 & 10 Vict. c. 37))
Dublin Foundling Hospital Act 1820 (repealed)	1 Geo. 4. c. 29	30 June 1820
An Act to enlarge the Powers of the Governors of the Foundling Hospital in Dublin. (Repealed by Statute Law (Repeals) Act 2013 (c. 2))
Relief of Rutson and Company Act 1820 (repealed)	1 Geo. 4. c. 30	30 June 1820
An Act for relieving Ewart Rutson and Company of Liverpool, and others, from the Bonds granted for the Duties on certain Spirits accidentally destroyed. (Repealed by Statute Law Revision Act 1874 (37 & 38 Vict. c. 35))
Exchequer Bills Act 1820 (repealed)	1 Geo. 4. c. 31	8 July 1820
An Act for raising the Sum of Twenty nine Millions by Exchequer Bills, for the Service of the Year One thousand eight hundred and twenty. (Repealed by Statute Law Revision Act 1873 (36 & 37 Vict. c. 91))
Importation (Barbadoes) Act 1820 (repealed)	1 Geo. 4. c. 32	8 July 1820
An Act to permit the Importation of Coffee from any Foreign Colony or Plantation in America into the Port of Bridgetown in Barbadoes. (Repealed by Trade Act 1822 (3 Geo. 4. c. 44))
Greenland Whale Fisheries Act 1820 (repealed)	1 Geo. 4. c. 33	8 July 1820
An Act to amend and continue, until the Thirty first Day of December One thousand eight hundred and twenty three, several Laws relating to the Encouragement of the Greenland Whale Fisheries, to the allowing Vessels employed in the said Fisheries to complete their full Number of Men at certain Ports. (Repealed by Statute Law Revision Act 1873 (36 & 37 Vict. c. 91))
Importation etc. (Demerara etc.) Act 1820 (repealed)	1 Geo. 4. c. 34	8 July 1820
An Act for further continuing, until the First Day of January One thousand eight hundred and twenty six, so much of an Act passed in the Fifty sixth Year of His late Majesty (Note: Trade of Demerara, etc. Act 1816 (56 Geo. 3. c. 91)) as permits Subjects of His Majesty the King of the Netherlands to import and export certain Articles into and from the Colonies of Demerara, Berbice and Essequibo, in Ships not of the Built of the Dominions of His said Majesty. (Repealed by Customs Law Repeal Act 1825 (6 Geo. 4. c. 105))
Court of Exchequer (England) etc. Act 1820 (repealed)	1 Geo. 4. c. 35	8 July 1820
An Act for the better securing Monies and Effects paid into the Court of Exchequer at Westminster, on account of the Suitors of the said Court, and for the Appointment of an Accountant General and Two Masters of the said Court; and for other Purposes. (Repealed by Statute Law Revision Act 1861 (24 & 25 Vict. c. 101))
Poor Law (Appeals) Act 1820 (repealed)	1 Geo. 4. c. 36	8 July 1820
An Act for allowing Appeals from Towns Corporate and Franchises, in certain Cases, to the General or Quarter Sessions of the Peace of the Counties in which they are situate. (Repealed by Statute Law Revision Act 1950 (14 Geo. 6. c. 6))
Appointment of Special Constables Act 1820 or the Special Constables Act 1820 (repealed)	1 Geo. 4. c. 37	8 July 1820
An Act to increase the Power of Magistrates in the Appointment of Special Constables. (Repealed for England and Wales by Special Constables Act 1831 (1 & 2 Will. 4. c. 41), for Ireland by Special Constables (Ireland) Act 1832 (2 & 3 Will. 4. c. 108) and for Scotland by Statute Law Revision Act 1861 (24 & 25 Vict. c. 101))
Quartering of Soldiers Act 1820 (repealed)	1 Geo. 4. c. 38	8 July 1820
An Act for fixing the Rates of Subsistence to be paid to Inn keepers and others on quartering Soldiers. (Repealed by Statute Law Revision Act 1873 (36 & 37 Vict. c. 91))
Support of Commercial Credit (Ireland) Act 1820 (repealed)	1 Geo. 4. c. 39	8 July 1820
An Act for the Assistance of Trade and Manufactures in Ireland, by authorising the Advance of certain Sums for the Support of Commercial Credit there. (Repealed by Statute Law Revision Act 1873 (36 & 37 Vict. c. 91))
Compensation for Tithes (Ireland) Act 1820 (repealed)	1 Geo. 4. c. 40	8 July 1820
An Act to amend and explain an Act, passed in the Parliament of Ireland in the Thirty ninth Year of His late Majesty, (Note: Compensation for Tithes Act 1799 (39 Geo. 3. c. 14 (I))) to enable certain Persons to recover a just Compensation for the Tithes withheld from them in the Years One thousand seven hundred and ninety seven and One thousand seven hundred and ninety eight. (Repealed by Statute Law Revision Act 1861 (24 & 25 Vict. c. 101))
Recovery of Tenements (Ireland) Act 1820 (repealed)	1 Geo. 4. c. 41	8 July 1820
An Act to extend the Benefit of Two Acts, made in the Fifty sixth (Note: Recovery of Tenements, etc. (Ireland) Act 1816 (56 Geo. 3. c. 88)) and Fifty eighth (Note: Recovery of Tenements, etc. (Ireland) Act 1818 (58 Geo. 3. c. 39)) Years of the Reign of His late Majesty King George the Third, for amending the Law of Ireland respecting the Recovery of Tenements from absconding, overholding and defaulting Tenants. (Repealed by Civil Bill Courts (Ireland) Act 1851 (14 & 15 Vict. c. 57) and Landlord and Tenant Law Amendment (Ireland) Act 1860 (23 & 24 Vict. c. 154))
Composition for a Crown Debt Act 1820 (repealed)	1 Geo. 4. c. 42	8 July 1820
An Act to authorise a Composition for the Debt remaining due to His Majesty from the late Abraham Goldsmid Merchant, and his surviving Partners. (Repealed by Statute Law Revision Act 1950 (14 Geo. 6. c. 6))
Smuggling etc. Act 1820 (repealed)	1 Geo. 4. c. 43	15 July 1820
An Act to amend the Laws relating to Smuggling, and the Coasting Trade in Great Britain. (Repealed by Customs Law Repeal Act 1825 (6 Geo. 4. c. 105))
Consolidated Fund Act 1820 (repealed)	1 Geo. 4. c. 44	15 July 1820
An Act to continue until the Fifth Day of July One thousand eight hundred and twenty one, an Act of the Fifty ninth Year of His late Majesty, (Note: Produce of Consolidated Fund Act 1819 (59 Geo. 3. c. 19)) for rendering the growing Produce of the Consolidated Fund of the United Kingdom, arising in Great Britain, available for the Public Service. (Repealed by Statute Law Revision Act 1873 (36 & 37 Vict. c. 91))
Customs (No. 3) Act 1820 (repealed)	1 Geo. 4. c. 45	15 July 1820
An Act to continue certain Duties on several Articles, the Manufacture of Great Britain or Ireland respectively, on their Importation into either Country from the other. (Repealed by Importation Act 1823 (4 Geo. 4. c. 26))
Treasury Bills (Ireland) Act 1820 (repealed)	1 Geo. 4. c. 46	15 July 1820
An Act for raising the Sum of One million five hundred thousand Pounds British Currency, by Treasury Bills in Ireland, for the Service of the Year One thousand eight hundred and twenty. (Repealed by Statute Law Revision Act 1873 (36 & 37 Vict. c. 91))
Arms (Ireland) Act 1820 (repealed)	1 Geo. 4. c. 47	15 July 1820
An Act to revive and to continue for Two Years, and from thence until the End of the then next Session of Parliament, Two Acts, made in the Forty seventh (Note: Possession of Arms (Ireland) Act 1807 (47 Geo. 3 Sess. 2. c. 54)) and Fiftieth (Note: Arms (Ireland) Act 1810 (50 Geo. 3. c. 109)) Years of the Reign of His late Majesty King George the Third, for the preventing improper Persons from having Arms in Ireland. (Repealed by Statute Law Revision Act 1873 (36 & 37 Vict. c. 91))
Yeomanry Corps (Ireland) Act 1820 (repealed)	1 Geo. 4. c. 48	15 July 1820
An Act to revive and continue for Two Years, and from thence until the End of the then next Session of Parliament, the Laws relating to Yeomanry Corps in Ireland. (Repealed by Statute Law Revision Act 1873 (36 & 37 Vict. c. 91))
Dublin House of Industry Act 1820 (repealed)	1 Geo. 4. c. 49	15 July 1820
An Act to amend the Laws relating to the House of Industry in Dublin. (Repealed by Statute Law (Repeals) Act 2013 (c. 2))
Removal of Slaves Act 1820 (repealed)	1 Geo. 4. c. 50	15 July 1820
An Act to carry into Effect certain Licences, permitting the Removal of Negro Slaves from the Bahama Islands to Demerara. (Repealed by Statute Law Revision Act 1873 (36 & 37 Vict. c. 91))
St. John's Newfoundland Act 1820 (repealed)	1 Geo. 4. c. 51	15 July 1820
An Act to regulate the rebuilding of the Town of Saint John's in Newfoundland, and for indemnifying Persons giving up Ground for that Purpose. (Repealed by Statute Law Revision Act 1873 (36 & 37 Vict. c. 91))
Importation Act 1820 (repealed)	1 Geo. 4. c. 52	15 July 1820
An Act to continue, until the Twenty fifth Day of March One thousand eight hundred and twenty one, an Act made in the Forty sixth Year of His late Majesty, (Note: Importation (No. 4) Act 1806 (46 Geo. 3. c. 117)) for permitting the Importation of Masts, Yards, Bowsprits, and Timber fit for Naval Purposes, from the British Colonies in North America. (Repealed by Statute Law Revision Act 1873 (36 & 37 Vict. c. 91))
Importation (No. 2) Act 1820 (repealed)	1 Geo. 4. c. 53	15 July 1820
An Act to continue, until the Twenty fifth Day of March One thousand eight hundred and twenty one, so much of an Act of the Fifty ninth Year of His late Majesty, (Note: Customs (No. 3) Act 1819 (59 Geo. 3. c. 52)) as allows Santa Maria Wood and Teake Wood to be imported free of Duty. (Repealed by Statute Law Revision Act 1873 (36 & 37 Vict. c. 91))
Bringing of Coals etc. to London etc. Act 1820 (repealed)	1 Geo. 4. c. 54	15 July 1820
An Act to continue, until the First Day of August One thousand eight hundred and twenty five, Two Acts of the Forty fifth (Note: Bringing of Coals, etc., to London, etc. Act 1805 (45 Geo. 3. c. 128)) and Fiftieth (Note: Bringing of Coals, etc., to London, etc. Act 1810 (50 Geo. 3. c. 110)) Years of His late Majesty, allowing the bringing of Coals, Culm and Cinders to London and Westminster by Inland Navigation. (Repealed by Statute Law Revision Act 1873 (36 & 37 Vict. c. 91))
Kings' Bench Justices of Assize Act 1820 (repealed)	1 Geo. 4. c. 55	15 July 1820
An Act for giving further Facilities to the Proceedings in the Court of King's Bench, and for giving certain Powers to Justices of Assize. (Repealed by Civil Procedure Acts Repeal Act 1879 (42 & 43 Vict. c. 59))
Malicious Trespass Act 1820 (repealed)	1 Geo. 4. c. 56	15 July 1820
An Act for the summary Punishment, in certain Cases, of Persons wilfully or maliciously damaging or committing Trespasses on public or private Property. (Repealed for England and Wales by Criminal Statutes Repeal Act 1827 (7 & 8 Geo. 4. c. 27), for Ireland by Criminal Statutes (Ireland) Repeal Act 1828 (9 Geo. 4. c. 53) and for India by Criminal Law (India) Act 1828 (9 Geo. 4. c. 74))
Whipping Act 1820 (repealed)	1 Geo. 4. c. 57	15 July 1820
An Act to repeal an Act passed in the Fifty seventh Year of the Reign of His late Majesty King George the Third, intituled "An Act to abolish the Punishment of public Whipping on Female Offenders," (Note: Whipping of Female Offenders, Abolition Act 1817 (57 Geo. 3. c. 75)) and to make further Provisions in lieu thereof. (Repealed by Criminal Justice Act 1948 (11 & 12 Geo. 6. c. 58))
Duties on Paper etc. Act 1820 (repealed)	1 Geo. 4. c. 58	15 July 1820
An Act for the better securing the Excise Duties on Paper and Pasteboard. (Repealed by Duties on Paper Act 1839 (2 & 3 Vict. c. 23))
Damaged Coffee etc. Act 1820 (repealed)	1 Geo. 4. c. 59	15 July 1820
An Act to amend, revive and continue, until the Twenty fifth Day of March One thousand eight hundred and twenty five, an Act of the Fifty second Year of His late Majesty, (Note: Coffee, etc. Act 1812 (52 Geo. 3. c. 149)) for regulating the Separation of damaged from sound Coffee, and for permitting Dealers to send out any Quantity of Coffee, not exceeding Eight Pounds Weight, without Permit. (Repealed by Statute Law Revision Act 1873 (36 & 37 Vict. c. 91))
Public Works Loans Act 1820 (repealed)	1 Geo. 4. c. 60	15 July 1820
An Act to amend and continue Two Acts passed in the Fifty seventh Year of His late Majesty King George the Third, (Note: Public Works Loans Act 1817 (57 Geo. 3. c. 34)) (Note: Public Works Loans (No. 2) Act 1817 (57 Geo. 3. c. 124)) for authorising the Issue of Exchequer Bills and the Advance of Money for carrying on of Public Works and Fisheries, and Employment of the Poor; and to extend the Powers of the Commissioners for executing the said Acts in Great Britain. (Repealed by Public Works Loans Act 1875 (38 & 39 Vict. c. 89))
Import Duties etc. (Isle of Man) Act 1820 (repealed)	1 Geo. 4. c. 61	15 July 1820
An Act to charge additional Duties on the Importation of certain Articles into the Isle of Man, and to regulate the Trade of the said Island. (Repealed by Customs Law Repeal Act 1825 (6 Geo. 4. c. 105))
Duties in New South Wales Act 1820 (repealed)	1 Geo. 4. c. 62	15 July 1820
An Act to continue, until the First Day of January One thousand eight hundred and twenty two, an Act of the Fifty ninth Year of His late Majesty, (Note: Duties in New South Wales Act 1819 (59 Geo. 3. c. 114)) for staying Proceedings against any Governor or other Persons concerned in imposing and levying Duties in New South Wales; for continuing certain Duties; and for empowering the said Governor to levy a Duty on Spirits made in the said Colony. (Repealed by Statute Law Revision Act 1873 (36 & 37 Vict. c. 91))
Bounty on Linens etc. Act 1820 (repealed)	1 Geo. 4. c. 63	15 July 1820
An Act to continue, until the Fifth Day of July One thousand eight hundred and twenty two, an Act of the Twenty ninth Year of King George the Second, (Note: Exportation Act 1756 (29 Geo. 2. c. 15)) for granting a Bounty on certain Species of British and Irish Linens exported, and for taking off the Duties on the Importation of Foreign Raw Linen Yarns made of Flax. (Repealed by Statute Law Revision Act 1873 (36 & 37 Vict. c. 91))
Sugar etc. Act 1820 (repealed)	1 Geo. 4. c. 64	15 July 1820
An Act to continue, until the Fifth Day of July One thousand eight hundred and twenty four, an Act made in the Fifty eighth Year of His late Majesty, (Note: Exportation Act 1818 (58 Geo. 3. c. 34)) to repeal the several Bounties on the Exportation of refined Sugar from the United Kingdom, and to allow other Bounties in lieu thereof, and to reduce the Size of the Packages in which refined Sugar may be exported. (Repealed by Statute Law Revision Act 1873 (36 & 37 Vict. c. 91))
Accounts of Colonial Revenues Act 1820 (repealed)	1 Geo. 4. c. 65	15 July 1820
An Act to continue, until the Thirtieth Day of July One thousand eight hundred and twenty one, an Act of the Fifty fourth Year of His late Majesty, (Note: Accounts of Colonial Revenues Act 1814 (54 Geo. 3. c. 184)) for the effectual Examination of the Accounts of the Receipt and Expenditure of the Colonial Revenues in the Islands of Ceylon, Mauritius, Malta, Trinidad, and in the Settlements of The Cape of Good Hope. (Repealed by Statute Law Revision Act 1873 (36 & 37 Vict. c. 91))
Police Magistrates Metropolitan Act 1820 (repealed)	1 Geo. 4. c. 66	15 July 1820
An Act to continue until the End of the next Session of Parliament, Two Acts of the Fifty fourth Year of His late Majesty, (Note: Police Magistrates, Metropolis Act 1813 (54 Geo. 3. c. 37)) (Note: Depredations on the Thames Act 1814 (54 Geo. 3. c. 187)) for the more effectual Administration of the Office of a Justice of the Peace in and near the Metropolis, and for the Prevention of Depredations on the River Thames. (Repealed by Statute Law Revision Act 1873 (36 & 37 Vict. c. 91))
Duties on Coal etc. Act 1820 (repealed)	1 Geo. 4. c. 67	15 July 1820
An Act to continue, until the First Day of August One thousand eight hundred and twenty two, the Low Duties on Coals and Culm carried coastwise to any Port within the Principality of Wales. (Repealed by Statute Law Revision Act 1873 (36 & 37 Vict. c. 91))
Exchequer Chamber (Ireland) Act 1820 (repealed)	1 Geo. 4. c. 68	15 July 1820
An Act for the better Administration of Justice in the Court of Exchequer Chamber in Ireland. (Repealed by Statute Law Revision Act 1873 (36 & 37 Vict. c. 91) and Statute Law Revision Act 1953 (2 & 3 Eliz. 2. c. 5))
Dunleary Harbour Act 1820 (repealed)	1 Geo. 4. c. 69	15 July 1820
An Act to alter and amend an Act passed in the Fifty sixth Year of His late Majesty, (Note: Dublin Harbour Act 1816 (56 Geo. 3. c. 62)) for erecting a Harbour for Ships to the Eastward of Dunleary, within the Port of Dublin; and to provide for the Erection of a Western Pier to the said Harbour of Dunleary. (Repealed by Dublin Port and Docks Act 1869 (32 & 33 Vict. c. c))
Roads (London to Chirk) Act 1820 (repealed)	1 Geo. 4. c. 70	15 July 1820
An Act for improving the Roads between London and Chirk, in the County of Denbigh, by Coventry, Birmingham and Shrewsbury. (Repealed by Statute Law (Repeals) Act 2013 (c. 2))
Crown Lands Act 1820 (repealed)	1 Geo. 4. c. 71	15 July 1820
An Act to enlarge the Time and Powers for carrying the New Street Act (Note: New Street Act 1813 (53 Geo. 3. c. 121)) into Execution; and to extend the Provisions of an Act, (Note: Duchy of Lancaster Act 1817 (57 Geo. 3. c. 97)) for ratifying an Agreement made with Lord Gage, and for the better Management and Improvement of the Land Revenues of the Crown. (Repealed by Statute Law Revision Act 1873 (36 & 37 Vict. c. 91))
Lotteries Act 1820 (repealed)	1 Geo. 4. c. 72	15 July 1820
An Act for granting to His Majesty a Sum of Money to be raised by Lotteries. (Repealed by Statute Law Revision Act 1861 (24 & 25 Vict. c. 101))
Assessed Taxes Act 1820 (repealed)	1 Geo. 4. c. 73	24 July 1820
An Act to extend the Period allowed to Persons compounding for their Assessed Taxes, and to give further Relief in certain cases therein mentioned. (Repealed by Revenue Act 1869 (32 & 33 Vict. c. 14))
Duties on Spirits etc. (Scotland) Act 1820 (repealed)	1 Geo. 4. c. 74	24 July 1820
An Act to grant certain Duties in Scotland upon Wash and Spirits made from Corn or Grain, and upon Licences for making and keeping of Stills; and to consolidate and amend the Laws for the Distillation of such Spirits for Home Consumption; and for better preventing private Distillation in Scotland. (Repealed by Statute Law Revision Act 1873 (36 & 37 Vict. c. 91))
Duty on Tobacco Act 1820 (repealed)	1 Geo. 4. c. 75	24 July 1820
An Act for charging a Duty of Excise on certain Sorts of unmanufactured Tobacco imported into Great Britain from the Place of its Growth. (Repealed by Statute Law Revision Act 1861 (24 & 25 Vict. c. 101))
Sale of Spirits (England) Act 1820 (repealed)	1 Geo. 4. c. 76	24 July 1820
An Act to repeal so much of an Act of the Fifty seventh Year of His late Majesty, (Note: Excise (No. 2) Act 1817 (57 Geo. 3. c. 123)) as prohibits the Sale in England of any Spirits not being Spirits of Wine, British Brandy, British Gin, or Compounds. (Repealed by Statute Law Revision Act 1873 (36 & 37 Vict. c. 91))
Trade in Spirits Act 1820 (repealed)	1 Geo. 4. c. 77	24 July 1820
An Act to continue, until the Fifth Day of July One thousand eight hundred and twenty five, several Acts for regulating the Trade in Spirits between Great Britain and Ireland reciprocally, to consolidate the countervailing Excise Duties payable on the Importation of Irish Spirits into Great Britain, and to amend the countervailing Excise Duties paid on the Importation of Irish Spirits from Scotland. (Repealed by Statute Law Revision Act 1873 (36 & 37 Vict. c. 91))
Duties on Spirit Licences etc. (Ireland) Act 1820 (repealed)	1 Geo. 4. c. 78	24 July 1820
An Act to reduce the Duties payable upon Licences for the Sale of Spirituous and other Liquors by Retail in certain Cities, Towns and Places in Ireland; and to amend the several Acts for securing the Payment of the Duties of Excise upon certain Licences in Ireland; and also to amend the Laws relating to Licensed Brewers in Ireland. (Repealed by Statute Law Revision Act 1861 (24 & 25 Vict. c. 101))
Licensed Brewers (Ireland) Act 1820 (repealed)	1 Geo. 4. c. 79	24 July 1820
An Act for making Allowances to licensed Brewers in Ireland, on account of the additional Duty on Malt used by them within a certain Period. (Repealed by Statute Law Revision Act 1873 (36 & 37 Vict. c. 91))
Sugar Duties (Ireland) Act 1820 (repealed)	1 Geo. 4. c. 80	24 July 1820
An Act allowing Importers of Sugar in Ireland to give Certificates for Sugar sold by them, in lieu of Permits. (Repealed by Customs Law Repeal Act 1825 (6 Geo. 4. c. 105))
Public Works Loans (Ireland) Act 1820 (repealed)	1 Geo. 4. c. 81	24 July 1820
An Act to amend several Acts made in the Fifty seventh and Fifty eighth (Note: Public Works Loans Act 1818 (58 Geo. 3. c. 88)) Years of His late Majesty, for the Advance of Money for carrying on Public Works, and for other Purposes, so far as the said Acts relate to Ireland. (Repealed by Statute Law Revision Act 1873 (36 & 37 Vict. c. 91))
Irish Fisheries Act 1820 (repealed)	1 Geo. 4. c. 82	24 July 1820
An Act to amend an Act of the Fifty ninth Year of the Reign of His late Majesty King George the Third, (Note: Irish Fisheries Act 1819 (59 Geo. 3. c. 109)) for the Encouragement and Improvement of the Irish Fisheries. (Repealed by Sea Fisheries Act 1868 (31 & 32 Vict. c. 45))
Savings Banks (England) Act 1820 (repealed)	1 Geo. 4. c. 83	24 July 1820
An Act to amend Two Acts of the Fifty seventh (Note: Savings Bank (England) Act 1817 (57 Geo. 3. c. 130)) and Fifty eighth (Note: Savings Bank (England) Act 1818 (58 Geo. 3. c. 48)) Years of His late Majesty, for the Encouragement of Banks for Savings in England. (Repealed by Savings Bank Act 1828 (9 Geo. 4. c. 92))
Army Prize Money Act 1820 (repealed)	1 Geo. 4. c. 84	24 July 1820
An Act to regulate the Payment of Army Prize Money. (Repealed by Army Prize Money Act 1832 (2 & 3 Will. 4. c. 53))
Naval Prize Money Act 1820 (repealed)	1 Geo. 4. c. 85	24 July 1820
An Act to make further Provisions respecting Naval Prize Money. (Repealed by Admiralty, &c. Acts Repeal Act 1865 (28 & 29 Vict. c. 112))
Militia Pay (Great Britain) Act 1820 (repealed)	1 Geo. 4. c. 86	24 July 1820
An Act to defray the Charge of the Pay, Clothing, and contingent Expenses of the Disembodied Militia in Great Britain; and to grant Allowances in certain Cases to Subaltern Officers, Adjutants, Quartermasters, Surgeons, Surgeons' Mates and Serjeant Majors of Militia, until the Twenty fifth Day of March One thousand eight hundred and twenty one. (Repealed by Statute Law Revision Act 1873 (36 & 37 Vict. c. 91))
Recovery of Possession by Landlords Act 1820 (repealed)	1 Geo. 4. c. 87	24 July 1820
An Act for enabling Landlords more speedily to recover Possession of Lands and Tenements unlawfully held over by Tenants. (Repealed for Ireland by Landlord and Tenant Law Amendment (Ireland) Act 1860 (23 & 24 Vict. c. 154) and for England and Wales by Statute Law Revision Act 1861 (24 & 25 Vict. c. 101))
Post Horse Duties Act 1820 (repealed)	1 Geo. 4. c. 88	24 July 1820
An Act to continue until the Thirty first Day of January One thousand eight hundred and twenty four, an Act of the Fifty seventh Year of His late Majesty, (Note: Post Horse Duties Act 1817 (57 Geo. 3. c. 59)) for letting to farm the Post Horse Duties, and to amend the Acts relating to the Post Horse Duties. (Repealed by Duties on Horses Act 1823 (4 Geo. 4. c. 62))
Postage Act 1820 (repealed)	1 Geo. 4. c. 89	24 July 1820
An Act for imposing additional Rates and Duties on the Conveyance of Letters between Port Patrick in Scotland and Donaghadee in Ireland. (Repealed by Post Office (Repeal of Laws) Act 1837 (7 Will. 4 & 1 Vict. c. 32))
Offences at Sea Act 1820 (repealed)	1 Geo. 4. c. 90	24 July 1820
An Act to remove Doubts, and to remedy Defects, in the Law, with respect to certain Offences committed upon the Sea, or within the Jurisdiction of the Admiralty. (Repealed by Criminal Law Act 1967 (c. 58))
Royal Marines Act 1820 (repealed)	1 Geo. 4. c. 91	24 July 1820
An Act to authorise the Paymasters of Royal Marines to issue Pay, not exceeding a certain Sum, to the Representatives of deceased Officers and Private Men, without Probate or Administration. (Repealed by Admiralty Act 1832 (2 & 3 Will. 4. c. 40))
Bank Notes Forgery (Scotland) Act 1820 (repealed)	1 Geo. 4. c. 92	24 July 1820
An Act for the further Prevention of forging and counterfeiting of Bank Notes. (Repealed by Forgery and Counterfeiting Act 1981 (c. 45))
Wages of Artificers etc. Act 1820 (repealed)	1 Geo. 4. c. 93	24 July 1820
An Act to amend and render more effectual the Provisions of divers Acts, for securing to certain Artificers, Workmen and Labourers, in such Acts mentioned, the due Payment of their Wages. (Repealed by Statute Law Revision Act 1873 (36 & 37 Vict. c. 91))
Census (Great Britain) Act 1820 (repealed)	1 Geo. 4. c. 94	24 July 1820
An Act for taking an Account of the Population of Great Britain, and of the Increase or Diminution thereof. (Repealed by Statute Law Revision Act 1873 (36 & 37 Vict. c. 91))
Turnpike Road Trusts Act 1820 (repealed)	1 Geo. 4. c. 95	24 July 1820
An Act for obtaining Returns from Turnpike Road Trusts of the Amount of their Revenues, and Expense of maintaining the same. (Repealed by Statute Law Revision Act 1873 (36 & 37 Vict. c. 91))
Militia Pay (Ireland) Act 1820 (repealed)	1 Geo. 4. c. 96	24 July 1820
An Act for defraying, until the Twenty fifth Day of June One thousand eight hundred and twenty one, the Charge of the Pay and Clothing of the Militia of Ireland; and for making Allowances to Officers and Quartermasters of the said Militia during Peace. (Repealed by Statute Law Revision Act 1873 (36 & 37 Vict. c. 91))
Insolvent Debtors (Ireland) Act 1820 (repealed)	1 Geo. 4. c. 97	24 July 1820
An Act to revive and to continue, for One Year, the several Acts for the Relief of Insolvent Debtors in Ireland. (Repealed by Statute Law Revision Act 1873 (36 & 37 Vict. c. 91))
Lunatic Asylums (Ireland) Act 1820 (repealed)	1 Geo. 4. c. 98	24 July 1820
An Act to amend an Act passed in the Fifty seventh Year of His late Majesty, (Note: Asylums for Lunatic Poor (Ireland) Act 1817 (57 Geo. 3. c. 106)) for the Establishment of Asylums for the Lunatic Poor in Ireland. (Repealed by Lunacy (Ireland) Act 1821 (1 & 2 Geo. 4. c. 33))
East India Company Act 1820 (repealed)	1 Geo. 4. c. 99	24 July 1820
An Act to enable the East India Company to raise and maintain a Corps of Volunteer Infantry. (Repealed by Statute Law Revision Act 1861 (24 & 25 Vict. c. 101))
Militia (City of London) Act 1820	1 Geo. 4. c. 100	24 July 1820
An Act for amending and reducing into One Act of Parliament, Two several Acts, passed in the Thirty-sixth (Note: London Militia Act 1796 (36 Geo. 3. c. 92)) and Thirty-ninth (Note: Militia of City of London Act 1799 (39 Geo. 3. c. 82)) Years of the Reign of His late Majesty King George the Third, for the better ordering and further regulating of the Militia of the City of London.
Divorce Bills Evidence Act 1820 (repealed)	1 Geo. 4. c. 101	24 July 1820
An Act to enable the Examination of Witnesses to be taken in India in support of Bills of Divorce on account of Adultery committed in India. (Repealed by Statute Law Revision Act 1950 (14 Geo. 6. c. 6))
Indictments Act 1820 (repealed)	1 Geo. 4. c. 102	24 July 1820
An Act for making general the Provisions of an Act made in the Forty sixth Year of the Reign of His late Majesty, (Note: Stealing Property from Mines Act 1816 (56 Geo. 3. c. 73)) for removing Difficulties in the Conviction of Offenders stealing Property from Mines. (Repealed by Statute Law Revision Act 1861 (24 & 25 Vict. c. 101))
British Fisheries Act 1820 (repealed)	1 Geo. 4. c. 103	24 July 1820
An Act for the further Encouragement and Improvement of the British Fisheries. (Repealed by Sea Fisheries Act 1868 (31 & 32 Vict. c. 45))
Grant for Erection of Barracks Act 1820 (repealed)	1 Geo. 4. c. 104	24 July 1820
An Act to enable His Majesty to defray the Charge of a certain Barrack by the Grant of an Annuity on the Consolidated Fund. (Repealed by Statute Law Revision Act 1873 (36 & 37 Vict. c. 91))
Aliens (No. 2) Act 1820 (repealed)	1 Geo. 4. c. 105	24 July 1820
An Act to continue for Two Years, an Act of the Fifty sixth Year of His late Majesty, (Note: Aliens Act 1816 (56 Geo. 3. c. 86)) for establishing Regulations respecting Aliens arriving in or resident in this Kingdom, in certain Cases. (Repealed by Statute Law Revision Act 1873 (36 & 37 Vict. c. 91))
Greenwich Hospital Livings in Northumberland Act 1820 (repealed)	1 Geo. 4. c. 106	24 July 1820
An Act to enable Chaplains in the Navy, presented to either of the Livings of Simonburn, Wark, Bellingham, Thorneyburn, Fallstone, or Greystead, in the County of Northumberland, to receive their Half Pay; and for other Purposes relating to the said Livings. (Repealed by Statute Law (Repeals) Act 1975 (c. 10))
Rents of the Rolls Estate etc. Act 1820 (repealed)	1 Geo. 4. c. 107	24 July 1820
An Act for appropriating to the Use of the Master of the Rolls for the time being the Rents of the Rolls Estate, and the Dividends of the Funds in the Court of Chancery arising from the Surplus Rents of that Estate. (Repealed by Rolls Estate Act 1837 (7 Will. 4 & 1 Vict. c. 46))
Apportionment Act 1820 (repealed)	1 Geo. 4. c. 108	24 July 1820
An Act for enabling His Majesty to settle Annuities upon certain Branches of the Royal Family in lieu of Annuities which have ceased upon the Demise of His late Majesty. (Repealed by Statute Law (Repeals) Act 1975 (c. 10))
Pensions to George III's Servants etc. Act 1820 (repealed)	1 Geo. 4. c. 109	24 July 1820
An Act to enable His Majesty to grant Pensions to Officers and Attendants upon His late Majesty, and other Persons to whom His said late Majesty had granted Pensions and Allowances. (Repealed by Statute Law Revision Act 1874 (37 & 38 Vict. c. 35))
Exchequer Bills (No. 2) Act 1820 (repealed)	1 Geo. 4. c. 110	24 July 1820
An Act to enable the Commissioners of His Majesty's Treasury to issue Exchequer Bills, on the Credit of such Aids or Supplies as have been or shall be granted by Parliament for the Service of the Year One thousand eight hundred and twenty. (Repealed by Statute Law Revision Act 1873 (36 & 37 Vict. c. 91))
Appropriation Act 1820 (repealed)	1 Geo. 4. c. 111	24 July 1820
An Act for applying certain Monies therein mentioned for the Service of the Year One thousand eight hundred and twenty, and for further appropriating the Supplies granted in this Session of Parliament. (Repealed by Statute Law Revision Act 1873 (36 & 37 Vict. c. 91))
Portpatrick Harbour Act 1820 (repealed)	1 Geo. 4. c. 112	24 July 1820
An Act for improving and completing the Harbour of Port Patrick in Scotland, so as to render the same a more fit Situation for His Majesty's Packets. (Repealed by Portpatrick Harbour Act 1873 (36 & 37 Vict. c. 14))
Donaghadee Harbour Act 1820 (repealed)	1 Geo. 4. c. 113	24 July 1820
An Act for granting a certain Sum of Money towards improving the Harbour of Donaghadee in Ireland, and rendering it a more fit Situation for His Majesty's Packets. (Repealed by Donaghadee Harbour (Transfer of Harbour Undertaking) Order (Northern Ireland) 2015 (SR(NI) 2015/22))
Caversham Rectory Act 1820 (repealed)	1 Geo. 4. c. 114	24 July 1820
An Act for enabling William Blackall Simonds Esquire to sell or mortgage his Estate and Interest in the Impropriate Rectory of Caversham, in the County of Oxford, free from the Claims of the Crown. (Repealed by Statute Law Revision Act 1950 (14 Geo. 6. c. 6))
Capital Punishment Act 1820 (repealed)	1 Geo. 4. c. 115	25 July 1820
An Act to repeal so much of the several Acts passed in the Thirty ninth Year of the Reign of Elizabeth, (Note: Abduction Act 1597 (39 Eliz. 1. c. 9)) the Fourth of George the First, (Note: Piracy Act 1717 (4 Geo. 1. c. 11)) the Fifth (Note: Bankrupts Act 1731 (5 Geo. 2. c. 30)) and Eighth (Note: Destruction of Turnpikes, etc. Act 1734 (8 Geo. 2. c. 20)) of George the Second, as inflicts Capital Punishments on certain Offences therein specified, and to provide more suitable and effectual Punishment for such Offences. (Repealed by Statute Law Revision Act 1861 (24 & 25 Vict. c. 101))
Capital Punishment (No. 2) Act 1820 (repealed)	1 Geo. 4. c. 116	25 July 1820
An Act to repeal so much of the several Acts passed in the First and Second Years of the Reign of Philip and Mary, (Note: Egyptians Act 1554 (1 & 2 Ph. & M. c. 4)) the Eighteenth of Charles the Second, (Note: Moss Troopers Act 1666 (18 & 19 Cha. 2. c. 3)) the Ninth of George the First, (Note: The Mint in Southwark Act 1722 (9 Geo. 1. c. 28)) and the Twelfth of George the Second, (Note: Westminster Bridge Act 1738 (12 Geo. 2. c. 33)) as inflicts Capital Punishment on certain Offences therein specified. (Repealed by Statute Law Revision Act 1873 (36 & 37 Vict. c. 91))
Stealing in Shops etc. Act 1820 (repealed)	1 Geo. 4. c. 117	25 July 1820
An Act to repeal so much of an Act passed in the Tenth and Eleventh Years of King William the Third, intituled "An Act for the better apprehending, prosecuting and punishing of Felons that commit Burglary, Housebreaking or Robbery, in Shops, Warehouses, Coachhouses or Stables, or that steal Horses," (Note: Clerks of Assize (Fees) Act 1698 (10 Will. 3. c. 12)) as takes away the Benefit of Clergy from Persons privately stealing in any Shop, Warehouse, Coachhouse or Stable, any Goods, Wares or Merchandises of the Value of Five Shillings; and for more effectually preventing the Crime of stealing privately in Shops, Warehouses, Coachhouses or Stables. (Repealed for England and Wales by Criminal Statutes Repeal Act 1827 (7 & 8 Geo. 4. c. 27) and for India by Criminal Law (India) Act 1828 (9 Geo. 4. c. 74))
Duty on Malt (Scotland) Act 1820 (repealed)	1 Geo. 4. c. 118	25 July 1820
An Act for reducing, until the Fifth Day of July One thousand eight hundred and twenty two, the Duty on Malt made from Bear or Bigg only, for Home Consumption in Scotland. (Repealed by Statute Law Revision Act 1861 (24 & 25 Vict. c. 101))
Relief of Insolvent Debtors Act 1820 or the Insolvent Debtors Act 1820 or the Insolvent Debtors (England) Act 1820 (repealed)	1 Geo. 4. c. 119	26 July 1820
An Act for the Relief of Insolvent Debtors in England; to continue in force until the First Day of June One thousand eight hundred and twenty five. (Repealed by Insolvent Debtors (England) Act 1826 (7 Geo. 4. c. 57))

=== Local acts ===
Short title	Citation	Royal assent
Long title
Ferrybridge and Boroughbridge Road Act 1820 (repealed)	1 Geo. 4. c. i	6 June 1820
An Act to continue the Term, and alter and enlarge the Powers of several Acts passed for repairing the Roads therein described, so far as the said Acts relate to the Roads leading from Ferrybridge, through Wetherby, to Boroughbridge, in the County of York. (Repealed by Ferrybridge and Boroughbridge Road Act 1842 (5 & 6 Vict. c. lxxxvi))
Knaresborough and Green Hammerton Road Act 1820 (repealed)	1 Geo. 4. c. ii	6 June 1820
An Act to continue the Term and alter and enlarge the Powers of several Acts (Note: Knaresborough and Green Hammerton Road Act 1751 (25 Geo. 2. c. 53)) (Note: Knaresborough and Green Hammerton Road Act 1771 (11 Geo. 3. c. 65)) (Note: Knaresborough and Green Hammerton Road Act 1799 (39 Geo. 3. c. ix)) passed for repairing the Road from Knaresborough to Green Hammerton, (Note: Green Hammerton, Yorkshire. 54°00′20″N 1°18′06″W) in the County of York. (Repealed by Knaresborough and Green Hammerton Turnpike Road Act 1856 (19 & 20 Vict. c. xlix))
Roads from Wirksworth Act 1820 (repealed)	1 Geo. 4. c. iii	6 June 1820
An Act for enlarging the Term and Powers of Two Acts of His late Majesty King George the Third, (Note: Derby Roads Act 1793 (33 Geo. 3. c. 152)) (Note: Wirksworth and Hulland Ward Road Act 1802 (42 Geo. 3. c. xcix)) for repairing the Road from the Moot Hall, in Wirksworth, to the Turnpike Road leading from Derby to Brassington; and from the said Moot Hall to another Turnpike Road leading from Wirksworth Moor to Matlock Bath, at or near to the Steeple House in Wirksworth aforesaid, all in the County of Derby. (Repealed by Roads from the Wirksworth Turnpike Road Act 1830 (11 Geo. 4 & 1 Will. 4. c. cv))
Bread Trade Act 1820 (repealed)	1 Geo. 4. c. iv	22 June 1820
An Act to continue until the Twenty fourth Day of June One thousand eight hundred and twenty two, Two Acts of the Fifty ninth (Note: London Bread Trade Act 1819 (59 Geo. 3. c. cxxvii)) and Sixtieth (Note: Bread Industry (London) Act 1819 (60 Geo. 3 & 1 Geo. 4. c. i)) Years of His late Majesty, for regulating the Weight and Sale of Bread. (Repealed by Statute Law (Repeals) Act 2008 (c. 12))
Beer Harbour Act 1820	1 Geo. 4. c. v	22 June 1820
An Act for repealing an Act of His late Majesty's Reign, for making a Harbour in the Cove of Beer, in the County of Devon, and for granting more effectual Powers for effecting the purpose aforesaid.
Blything Poor Relief Act 1820 (repealed)	1 Geo. 4. c. vi	22 June 1820
An Act for altering and enlarging the Powers of Two Acts of His late Majesty, (Note: Blything, Suffolk (Poor Relief) Act 1764 (4 Geo. 3. c. 56)) (Note: Blything, Suffolk (Poor Relief, Guardians, etc.) Act 1793 (33 Geo. 3. c. 126)) for the better Relief and Employment of the Poor in the Hundred of Blything, in the County of Suffolk. (Repealed by Statute Law (Repeals) Act 2013 (c. 2))
Montgomeryshire Bridges Act 1820	1 Geo. 4. c. vii	22 June 1820
An Act for regulating the Repairs of the Bridges in the County of Montgomery.
Wolverhampton Gas Act 1820 (repealed)	1 Geo. 4. c. viii	22 June 1820
An Act for lighting with Gas the Town of Wolverhampton, in the County of Stafford. (Repealed by Wolverhampton Gas Act 1847 (10 & 11 Vict. c. xv))
Derby Gas Act 1820 (repealed)	1 Geo. 4. c. ix	22 June 1820
An Act for lighting with Gas the Borough of Derby. (Repealed by Derby Gas Act 1841 (4 & 5 Vict. c. xv))
Gloucester Gas Act 1820 (repealed)	1 Geo. 4. c. x	22 June 1820
An Act for incorporating the City of Gloucester Gas Light Company. (Repealed by Gloucester Gaslight Company's Act 1856 (19 & 20 Vict. c. cxviii))
Norwich Gas Act 1820 (repealed)	1 Geo. 4. c. xi	22 June 1820
An Act for lighting with Gas the City of Norwich, and County of the same City. (Repealed by British Gaslight Company (Norwich) Act 1858 (21 & 22 Vict. c. lxxix))
Hastings Improvement Act 1820 (repealed)	1 Geo. 4. c. xii	22 June 1820
An Act for repealing an Act of His late Majesty's Reign, (Note: Hastings Improvement Act 1789 (29 Geo. 3. c. 27)) for paving and improving the Parish of Saint Clement, in the Town and Port of Hastings, in the County of Sussex, and for granting other and more effectual Powers in lieu thereof; for paving and otherwise improving the Streets, Lanes, and other public Passages and Places, and for repairing the Highways within the said Parish and the Parish of All Saints, and that Part of the Parish of Saint Mary in the Castle which is situate within the Liberties of the said Town and Port. (Repealed by Hastings Improvement Act 1832 (2 & 3 Will. 4. c. xci))
Liverpool Improvement Act 1820 (repealed)	1 Geo. 4. c. xiii	22 June 1820
An Act for reviving, extending, and varying the Powers of an Act, passed in the Twenty sixth Year of His late Majesty King George the Third, for making and widening certain Streets, Passages and Places in the Town of Liverpool, in the County Palatine of Lancaster, and for several other Purposes in the said Act mentioned, and also for further improving the said Town. (Repealed by Liverpool Corporation Act 1921 (11 & 12 Geo. 5. c. lxxiv))
Ashton in Mackerfield and Platt Bridge Road Act 1820	1 Geo. 4. c. xiv	22 June 1820
An Act for continuing the Term and altering and enlarging the Powers of an Act of His late Majesty's Reign, (Note: Ince and Ashton in Mackerfield Road Act 1800 (39 & 40 Geo. 3. c. lxxiii)) for amending the Road leading out of the Highway from Wigan to Golborn and Warrington, into the Road from Wigan to Ashton, in Ashton in Mackerfield, in the County Palatine of Lancaster.
Chester and Woodside Ferry Roads Act 1820 (repealed)	1 Geo. 4. c. xv	22 June 1820
An Act to continue the Term and alter and enlarge the Powers of Two Acts (Note: Chester Roads Act 1787 (27 Geo. 3. c. 93)) (Note: Chester and Woodside Ferry Roads Act 1803 (43 Geo. 3. c. xciii)) passed for amending the Roads from the City of Chester to the Woodside Ferry, in the County of Chester, and other Roads therein mentioned; and for making a Diversion in some Part of the said Roads. (Repealed by Chester, Neston and Woodside Ferry District of Roads Act 1833 (3 & 4 Will. 4. c. xl))
Road from Cheltenham to Prinknash Act 1820 (repealed)	1 Geo. 4. c. xvi	22 June 1820
An Act for making and maintaining a Road from the Town of Cheltenham to join the present Turnpike Road from Cheltenham to Painswick, at or near to Prinknash Park Wall, in the County of Gloucester. (Repealed by Cheltenham and Painswick Turnpike Road Act 1851 (14 & 15 Vict. c. xi))
Hulmes Chapel and Chelford Road Act 1820	1 Geo. 4. c. xvii	22 June 1820
An Act for enlarging the Term and Powers of an Act passed in the Thirty seventh Year of His late Majesty, (Note: Hulmes Chapel and Chelford Road Act 1797 (37 Geo. 3. c. 157)) for repairing the Road from Hulmes Chapel, in the County Palatine of Chester, to the South Bridge in Chelford, in the said County.
Road from Kirkby Kendall to Kirkby Ireleth Act 1820 (repealed)	1 Geo. 4. c. xviii	22 June 1820
An Act for enlarging the Term and Powers of several Acts of His late Majesty, for repairing the Road from Kirkby Kendall, in the County of Westmoreland, to Kirkby Ireleth, in the County of Lancaster. (Repealed by Annual Turnpike Acts Continuance Act 1872 (35 & 36 Vict. c. 85))
Roads from Cheadle to Quickshill Bank and from Bears Brook Act 1820	1 Geo. 4. c. xix	22 June 1820
An Act for enlarging the Term and Powers of an Act of His late Majesty, (Note: Cheadle and Quickshill Bank and Bear's Brook and Rocester Roads Act 1799 (39 Geo. 3. c. lxxv)) for repairing the Road from Cheadle to Quickshill Bank, and from Bears Brook to Rocester in the County of Stafford; and for making a new Road from Denston to Rocester in the said County.
Lightpill and Birdlip Road Act 1820 (repealed)	1 Geo. 4. c. xx	22 June 1820
An Act to enlarge the Term and Powers of an Act of His late Majesty, (Note: Rodburgh and Birdlip Road Act 1800 (39 & 40 Geo. 3. c. xliii)) for making and maintaining the Road from near Lightpill Gate, in the Parish of Rodborough, to near Birdlip, in the Parishes of Brimpsfield and Cowley, or one of them, all in the County of Gloucester. (Repealed by Lightpill and Birdlip Road Act 1855 (18 & 19 Vict. c. cvi))
Plymouth and Exeter Road Act 1820	1 Geo. 4. c. xxi	22 June 1820
An Act to improve certain Parts of the Line of Road between the Borough of Plymouth and the City of Exeter, through Ashburton and Chudleigh, in the County of Devon.
Wansford Bridge and Bourn Road Act 1820 (repealed)	1 Geo. 4. c. xxii	22 June 1820
An Act for more effectually repairing the Road from Wansford Bridge, in the County of Northampton, to Stamford; and from Stamford to Bourn, in the County of Lincoln. (Repealed by Wansford Bridge, Stamford and Bourn Road Act 1823 (4 Geo. 4. c. cxi))
York and Scarborough Road Act 1820 (repealed)	1 Geo. 4. c. xxiii	22 June 1820
An Act for continuing and amending an Act of His late Majesty, (Note: York and Scarborough Roads Act 1798 (38 Geo. 3. c. xxxvii)) for repairing the Roads from Monk Bridge, near the City of York, to New Malton, and from thence to Scarborough, and also from Spittle House to Scarborough aforesaid, all in the County of York. (Repealed by York and Scarborough, and Spittle House and Scarborough Roads Act 1833 (3 & 4 Will. 4. c. ix))
Weyhill and Lydeway Road Act 1820	1 Geo. 4. c. xxiv	22 June 1820
An Act to continue and amend Three Acts passed in the Second, (Note: Weyhill and Lyde Way Road Act 1762 (2 Geo. 3. c. 60)) Twenty second, (Note: Wey Hill to Lyde Way Road Act 1782 (22 Geo. 3. c. 109)) and Thirty ninth (Note: Weyhill and Lydeway Road Act 1799 (39 Geo. 3. c. xx)) Years of His late Majesty King George the Third, for repairing the Road from the Turnpike Road at Weyhill, in the County of Southampton, to the Turnpike Road at Lyde Way, in the County of Wilts.
Road from Cranage Green to Altrincham Act 1820	1 Geo. 4. c. xxv	22 June 1820
An Act to continue the Term, and to alter, amend, and enlarge the Powers of the several Acts for repairing the Roads from Henshall's Smithy, upon Cranage Green, through Nether Knutsford, to Altrincham, and other Roads therein mentioned, all in the County Palatine of Chester.
Road from Greenhead (Northumberland) to Shildon Bar Act 1820 (repealed)	1 Geo. 4. c. xxvi	22 June 1820
An Act for more effectually improving the Road from Greenhead through Haltwhistle, Hexham, and Corbridge, to the Military Road near Shildon Bar, and for making a Branch Road from Corbridge to Heddon-on-the-Wall, all in the County of Northumberland; and for altering the Line of a certain Part of the said first mentioned Road. (Repealed by Hexham Turnpike Road Act 1854 (17 & 18 Vict. c. lxxiv))
Stonehaven and Cobbleheugh Road (Aberdeen) Act 1820 (repealed)	1 Geo. 4. c. xxvii	22 June 1820
An Act to enlarge the Term and Powers of an Act passed in the Thirty ninth and Fortieth Years of His late Majesty, (Note: Stonehaven and Cobleheugh Road Act 1800 (39 & 40 Geo. 3. c. xvii)) for making and repairing the Road from the Town of Stonehaven, through the Slug Mount, to the New Bridge over the River Dee, at Cobleheugh, in the County of Kincardine. (Repealed by Stonehaven and Cobleheugh Road (Slug Mount) Act 1842 (5 & 6 Vict. c. lxxv))
Stockport and Warrington Road Act 1820 (repealed)	1 Geo. 4. c. xxviii	22 June 1820
An Act for making and maintaining a Turnpike Road from or nearly from the Town of Stockport, in the County Palatine of Chester, to or near unto the Town of Warrington, in the County Palatine of Lancaster, and a Branch of Road to communicate therewith. (Repealed by Stockport and Warrington Road Act 1856 (19 & 20 Vict. c. lxvi))
Whiteburn and Kelso Road Act 1820 (repealed)	1 Geo. 4. c. xxix	22 June 1820
An Act to continue and enlarge the Term and Powers of an Act of the Thirty ninth Year of the Reign of His late Majesty, (Note: Whiteburn and Kelso Road Act 1799 (39 Geo. 3. c. iii)) for making and maintaining the Road from or near Whiteburn, in the County of Berwick, to the Town of Kelso, in the County of Roxburgh. (Repealed by Whiteburn and Kelso Road (Berwick) Act 1847 (10 & 11 Vict. c. iii))
Road from Gateshead to Hexham Act 1820 (repealed)	1 Geo. 4. c. xxx	22 June 1820
An Act for more effectually improving the Road from Gateshead, in the County of Durham, to the Church Lane near Ryton Lane Head, and from the Bar Moor to the Hexham Turnpike Road, near Dilston Bar, in the County of Northumberland, and other Roads therein described; and also for altering the Line of a certain Part of the first above mentioned Road. (Repealed by Gateshead and Hexham Turnpike Roads Act 1855 (18 & 19 Vict. c. clxxvi))
Gosport and Bishop's Waltham, and Wickham and Chawton Roads Act 1820 (repealed)	1 Geo. 4. c. xxxi	22 June 1820
An Act for continuing the Term and altering and amending the Powers of Two Acts (Note: Southampton Roads Act 1780 (20 Geo. 3. c. 77)) (Note: Gosport and Bishop's Waltham, and Wickham and Cawton Roads Act 1799 (39 Geo. 3. c. xvii)) for repairing and widening the Roads from Gosport, through Fareham and Wickham, to Bishop's Waltham; and from Wickham aforesaid to Chawton Pond, in the Parish of Chawton, all in the County of Southampton. (Repealed by Gosport and Bishop's Waltham, and Wickham and Chawton Road Act 1828 (9 Geo. 4. c. xlix))
Malmesbury Turnpike Roads Act 1820 (repealed)	1 Geo. 4. c. xxxii	22 June 1820
An Act for more effectually repairing and improving several Districts of Malmesbury Turnpike Roads, and other Roads connected therewith, in the Counties of Wilts, Berks and Gloucester. (Repealed by Malmesbury Turnpike Roads Act 1851 (14 & 15 Vict. c. lxxvi))
Ludlow Roads Act 1820	1 Geo. 4. c. xxxiii	22 June 1820
An Act for amending, diverting, altering, straightening, improving, completing and keeping in Repair several Roads leading from the Market House in the Town of Ludlow and elsewhere, in the County of Salop.
Road from Ludlow to Monk's Bridge Act 1820 (repealed)	1 Geo. 4. c. xxxiv	22 June 1820
An Act for repairing and improving the Road leading from the Town of Ludlow in the County of Salop, through Woofferton and Little Hereford, to a Place called Monk's Bridge, in the said County; and also from the said Town of Ludlow to a Place or House called The Maidenhead, at Orleton, in the said County of Hereford. (Repealed by Ludlow Turnpike Roads Act 1859 (22 & 23 Vict. c. lxxxix))
River Ure Navigation to Ripon Act 1820	1 Geo. 4. c. xxxv	23 June 1820
An Act for maintaining navigable the River Ure, and its collateral Cuts, from its Junction with the River Swale, to the Borough of Ripon in the County of York.
Goran (Cornwall) Harbour Act 1820	1 Geo. 4. c. xxxvi	23 June 1820
An Act for completing and maintaining the Harbour, Quay or Pier, at the Village of Goran Haven, in the Parish of Goran, in the County of Cornwall.
Trinity House of Leith Act 1820 (repealed)	1 Geo. 4. c. xxxvii	23 June 1820
An Act for the Regulation of the Corporation of the Masters and Assistants of the Trinity House of Leith. (Repealed by Corporation of the Trinity House of Leith Order Confirmation Act 1965 (c. xliii))
Roads to and from Lawton (Cheshire) Act 1820 (repealed)	1 Geo. 4. c. xxxviii	23 June 1820
An Act for repairing the Roads from Butt Lane, in the Parish of Lawton, in the County Palatine of Chester, to Lawton, and from thence to Henshall's Smithy, upon Cranage Green, in the said County. (Repealed by Annual Turnpike Acts Continuance Act 1867 (30 & 31 Vict. c. 121))
Aire and Calder Navigation Act 1820	1 Geo. 4. c. xxxix	30 June 1820
An Act to enable the Undertakers of the Navigation of the Rivers Aire and Calder, in the West Riding of the County of York, to make a Navigable Cut or Canal from and out of the said Navigation at Knottingley, to communicate with the River Ouze, near Goole, with Two Collateral Branches, all in the said Riding; and to amend the Acts relating to the said Navigation.
Weymouth and Melcombe Regis Bridge Act 1820	1 Geo. 4. c. xl	30 June 1820
An Act for repairing or taking down and rebuilding the Bridge within the Borough and Town of Weymouth and Melcombe Regis, in the County of Dorset.
St. Mary Newington Parish Churches Act 1820	1 Geo. 4. c. xli	30 June 1820
An Act for building Two new Churches or Chapels in the Parish of Saint Mary Newington, commonly called Newington Butts, in the County of Surrey; and for other Purposes relating thereto.
St. Mary Rotherhithe Burial Ground Act 1820 (repealed)	1 Geo. 4. c. xlii	30 June 1820
An Act for providing additional Burying Ground for the Parish of Saint Mary, Rotherhithe, in the County of Surrey. (Repealed by London Government (Borough of Bermondsey) Order in Council 1901 (SR&O 1901/264))
Huddersfield Improvement Act 1820 (repealed)	1 Geo. 4. c. xliii	30 June 1820
An Act for lighting watching and cleansing the Town of Huddersfield, in the West Riding of the County of York. (Repealed by Huddersfield Amendment Act 1848 (11 & 12 Vict. c. cxl))
Milford, Petworth and Stopham Bridge Roads Act 1820 (repealed)	1 Geo. 4. c. xliv	30 June 1820
An Act to enlarge the Term and Powers of several Acts for repairing and widening the Roads from Milford, in the County of Surrey, through Petworth, to the Top of Dunckton Hill, and from Petworth to Stopham Bridge, in the County of Sussex. (Repealed by Petworth Turnpike Roads Act 1854 (17 & 18 Vict. c. lxxi))
Pool, Oswestry and Wrexham Roads Act 1820	1 Geo. 4. c. xlv	30 June 1820
An Act for more effectually repairing and improving the Road from the Town of Pool, in the County of Montgomery, through Oswestry, in the County of Salop, to Wrexham, in the County of Denbigh, and several other Roads therein mentioned in the said Counties, and in the County of Merioneth; and for making several new Branches of Roads to communicate with the said Roads in the Counties of Salop, Montgomery, and Denbigh.
Tenterden and Warehorne, and Bethersden and Appledore Roads Act 1820 (repealed)	1 Geo. 4. c. xlvi	30 June 1820
An Act for widening and improving the Road leading from the Turnpike Road in the Town of Tenterden, through Woodchurch to Warehorne, and the Road leading out of the Turnpike Road in the Parish of Bethersden, through Woodchurch to Appledore, in the County of Kent. (Repealed by Woodchurch Turnpike Road Act 1851 (14 & 15 Vict. c. xv))
Military Roads in Perth Act 1820	1 Geo. 4. c. xlvii	30 June 1820
An Act for maintaining and repairing The Military Roads in the County of Perth, and the several Branches or Roads of Communication therewith connected.
Forth and Clyde Navigation Act 1820	1 Geo. 4. c. xlviii	8 July 1820
An Act for altering and amending several Acts for making and maintaining the Forth and Clyde Navigation.
Southwark Bridge Act 1820	1 Geo. 4. c. xlix	8 July 1820
An Act to alter and amend several Acts for erecting a Bridge over the River Thames from the City of London to the opposite Bank in the County of Surrey.
Dunbarney Earn Bridge Act 1820	1 Geo. 4. c. l	8 July 1820
An Act for taking down the old Bridge, and for erecting and maintaining a new Bridge, over the River Earn, in the Parish of Dunbarney and Shire of Perth.
Norwich, Duke's Palace Bridge Act 1820 (repealed)	1 Geo. 4. c. li	8 July 1820
An Act for building a Bridge over the River Wensum, in the City of Norwich, at or near the Duke's Palace in the said City. (Repealed by Norwich City Council Act 1984 (c. xxiii))
Cork Harbour Act 1820	1 Geo. 4. c. lii	8 July 1820
An Act for erecting a Ballast Office, and for regulating Pilots within the Port and Harbour of Cork; and for rendering more safe and commodious the said Port and Harbour for all Ships and Vessels trading to and from the same.
Society of Keelmen on the River Tyne Act 1820	1 Geo. 4. c. liii	8 July 1820
An Act for altering and amending an Act of His late Majesty, (Note: Tyne Skippers and Keelmen (Relief Fund) Act 1788 (28 Geo. 3. c. 59)) for establishing a permanent Fund for the Relief and Support of Skippers and Keelmen employed upon the River Tyne, their Widows and Children, and for augmenting the said Fund.
Plymouth and Dartmoor Railway (Crabtree and Sutton Pool Branch) Act 1820 (repealed)	1 Geo. 4. c. liv	8 July 1820
An Act for making a Branch Railway or Tram Road from a Place called Crabtree, in the Parish of Egg Buckland, to certain Lime Works at a Place called Catdown, and from thence to Sutton Pool, in the Parish of Charles, all in the County of Devon, to communicate with the Plymouth and Dartmoor Railway, at Crabtree aforesaid. (Repealed by Plymouth and Dartmoor Railway Act 1865 (28 & 29 Vict. c. cxxxi))
Dublin Gas Act 1820 (repealed)	1 Geo. 4. c. lv	8 July 1820
An Act for lighting the City and Suburbs of Dublin with Gas. (Repealed by United General Gaslight Company's Act 1866 (29 & 30 Vict. c. cxcix))
Shrewsbury Gas Act 1820 (repealed)	1 Geo. 4. c. lvi	8 July 1820
An Act for lighting with Gas the Town and Suburbs of Shrewsbury, in the County of Salop. (Repealed by Shrewsbury Gasworks Act 1857 (20 & 21 Vict. c. lviii))
Bolton Gas Act 1820 (repealed)	1 Geo. 4. c. lvii	8 July 1820
An Act for lighting with Gas the Towns of Great and Little Bolton, in the County Palatine of Lancaster. (Repealed by Bolton Gas Light and Coke Company Act 1843 (6 & 7 Vict. c. xiv))
St. Matthew's Chapel, Pendleton Act 1820 or the Eccles and Pendleton Chapel Repealing Act 1820	1 Geo. 4. c. lviii	8 July 1820
An Act to repeal an Act made in the Fifty eighth Year of His late Majesty, (Note: Pendleton Chapel of Ease Act 1818 (58 Geo. 3. c. lxxxvi)) for building a Chapel of Ease in the Township of Pendleton and Parish of Eccles, in the County Palatine of Lancaster.
Parish of St. Dunstan in the West, City of London Act 1820	1 Geo. 4. c. lix	8 July 1820
An Act for uniting the Rectory and Vicarage of the Parish of Saint Dunstan in the West, in the City of London, and for making a certain Annual Payment to the Rector of the said Parish in lieu of Tithes.
Theatre Royal Drury Lane Act 1820	1 Geo. 4. c. lx	8 July 1820
An Act for altering and enlarging the Powers of Two Acts of the Fiftieth (Note: Drury Lane Theatre Act 1810 (50 Geo. 3. c. ccxiv)) and Fifty second (Note: Drury Lane Theatre Act 1812 (52 Geo. 3. c. xix)) Years of the Reign of His late Majesty, for rebuilding the Theatre Royal Drury Lane.
Bury St. Edmunds Improvement Act 1820 (repealed)	1 Geo. 4. c. lxi	8 July 1820
An Act to amend extend and render more effectual an Act of His late Majesty, (Note: Bury St. Edmund's Improvement Act 1811 (51 Geo. 3. c. ix)) for paving, lighting, cleansing, watching and otherwise improving the Town of Bury Saint Edmunds, in the County of Suffolk. (Repealed by Local Government Board's Provisional Orders Confirmation Act 1873 (No. 6) (36 & 37 Vict. c. ccxvi))
Stockton Improvement Act 1820 (repealed)	1 Geo. 4. c. lxii	8 July 1820
An Act for lighting, cleansing and otherwise improving the Town and Borough of Stockton, in the County of Durham. (Repealed by Stockton Extension and Improvement Act 1852 (15 & 16 Vict. c. xviii))
Whitgift and Snaith Drainage Act 1820	1 Geo. 4. c. lxiii	8 July 1820
An Act for warping and otherwise improving certain Moors, Commons, Wastes, and other Lowlands and Grounds, in the Parishes of Whitgift and Snaith, in the West Riding of the County of York.
Road from North Shields to Newcastle-upon-Tyne Act 1820 (repealed)	1 Geo. 4. c. lxiv	8 July 1820
An Act for continuing and amending Four Acts of their late Majesties King George the Second and King George the Third, (Note: North Shields to Newcastle Road Act 1748 (22 Geo. 2. c. 9)) (Note: North Shields to Newcastle Road Act 1774 (14 Geo. 3. c. 115)) (Note: North Shields to Newcastle Road Act 1796 (36 Geo. 3. c. 130)) (Note: North Shields to Newcastle Road Act 1810 (50 Geo. 3. c. xlix)) for repairing the Road from North Shields in the County of Northumberland, to the Town of Newcastle-upon-Tyne; and certain Branches communicating therewith. (Repealed by Road from North Shields to Newcastle-upon-Tyne Act 1831 (1 & 2 Will. 4. c. lxxii))
Selby and Leeds Road Act 1820 (repealed)	1 Geo. 4. c. lxv	8 July 1820
An Act for amending the Road from Selby to Leeds, in the West Riding of the County of York. (Repealed by Selby and Leeds Road Act 1841 (4 & 5 Vict. c. cvi))
Rochester and Maidstone Road Act 1820	1 Geo. 4. c. lxvi	8 July 1820
An Act for continuing the Term, and altering, amending and enlarging the Powers of Two Acts of the Thirteenth (Note: Kent Roads (No. 2) Act 1773 (13 Geo. 3. c. 114)) and Thirty ninth (Note: Rochester and Maidstone Road Act 1799 (39 Geo. 3. c. lxii)) Years of the Reign of His late Majesty King George the Third, for repairing the Road leading from the High Street in the City of Rochester, to Maidstone, in the County of Kent.
Roads in Stirling, Dumbarton, Lanark and Perth Act 1820 (repealed)	1 Geo. 4. c. lxvii	8 July 1820
An Act for more effectually repairing and maintaining several Roads in the Counties of Stirling, Dumbarton, Lanark and Perth. (Repealed by Stirling, Dumbarton, Lanark and Perth Roads Act 1840 (3 & 4 Vict. c. ci))
Wakefield and Austerlands Road Act 1820 (repealed)	1 Geo. 4. c. lxviii	8 July 1820
An Act for repairing and maintaining the Road from Wakefield to Austerlands, in the West Riding of the County of York. (Repealed by Wakefield and Austerlands Road Act 1831 (1 & 2 Will. 4. c. xxxvii))
Roads to and from Devizes Act 1820	1 Geo. 4. c. lxix	8 July 1820
An Act for repairing and improving several Roads leading into and from Devizes, in the County of Wilts.
Hertford and Broadwater, and Ware and Walkern Roads Act 1820	1 Geo. 4. c. lxx	8 July 1820
An Act for continuing and amending Three Acts, (Note: Hertford and Broadwater Road Act 1757 (30 Geo. 2. c. 45)) (Note: Hertford and Broadwater and Ware and Walkern Act Roads 1778 (18 Geo. 3. c. 94)) (Note: Hertford and Broadwater and Ware and Walkern Roads Act 1799 (39 Geo. 3. c. xviii)) of their Majesties King George the Second and King George the Third, for repairing the Roads from Hertford to Broadwater, and from Ware to Walkern, all in the County of Hertford.
Morpeth and Piercy's Cross Road (Northumberland) Act 1820 (repealed)	1 Geo. 4. c. lxxi	8 July 1820
An Act for repairing the Road leading from Longhorseley Bar, near the Town of Morpeth, by Longhorseley, Weldon Bridge, and Whittingham, to the River Breamish, and from thence to Piercey's Cross, in the County of Northumberland. (Repealed by Breamish and Wooler Turnpike Roads Act 1831 (1 & 2 Will. 4. c. xxiii))
Roads from Swindon and from Liddington Act 1820	1 Geo. 4. c. lxxii	8 July 1820
An Act for continuing the Term and enlarging the Powers of an Act of His late Majesty, (Note: Road from Swindon to Ramsbury Act 1814 (54 Geo. 3. c. l)) for making a Road from Swindon to Knighton, and from Liddington to Burderop, in the County of Wilts.
Towcester to Weston Gate Road Act 1820 (repealed)	1 Geo. 4. c. lxxiii	8 July 1820
An Act for repairing the Road from Towcester through Brackley, in the County of Northampton, to Weston Gate, in the Parish of Weston on the Green, in the County of Oxford. (Repealed by Brackley Turnpike Roads Consolidation Act 1851 (14 & 15 Vict. c. lxi))
Roads in Dumfries and Roxburgh Act 1820 (repealed)	1 Geo. 4. c. lxxiv	8 July 1820
An Act for more effectually repairing and maintaining certain Roads in the Counties of Dumfries and Roxburgh. (Repealed by Roxburgh and Dumfries Turnpike Roads Act 1841 (4 & 5 Vict. c. xcvii))
Itchin Navigation Rates Act 1820	1 Geo. 4. c. lxxv	15 July 1820
An Act for increasing the Rates on Goods and Commodities conveyed on the River Itchin, in the County of Southampton.
Lanark and Glasgow Bridewell Act 1820 (repealed)	1 Geo. 4. c. lxxvi	15 July 1820
An Act for erecting a Bridewell for the County of Lanark and City of Glasgow. (Repealed by Lanark and Glasgow Bridewell Act 1822 (3 Geo. 4. c. liv))
Ely Sessions House and House of Correction Act 1820 (repealed)	1 Geo. 4. c. lxxvii	15 July 1820
An Act for erecting a new Sessions House and House of Correction at Ely in the Isle of Ely, and for reimbursing to the Inhabitants of a Part of the said Isle the Charges of a Sessions House and House of Correction lately erected at Wisbech in the said Isle. (Repealed by Statute Law (Repeals) Act 2008 (c. 12))
Exeter Markets Act 1820	1 Geo. 4. c. lxxviii	15 July 1820
An Act for removing the Markets held within the City of Exeter, and for providing another Market Place, or other Market Places, in lieu thereof.
Somersham Road (Huntingdonshire) Act 1820	1 Geo. 4. c. lxxix	15 July 1820
An Act for repairing the Road from Chatteris Ferry through Somersham to the Crown Inn in Saint Ives, and also the Road branching out of the said Road near Stock's Bridge through Needingworth to Hermitage Bridge in the Parish of Earith the County of Huntingdon.
Market Harborough and Brampton Road Act 1820 (repealed)	1 Geo. 4. c. lxxx	15 July 1820
An Act for enlarging the Term and Powers of several Acts of His Majesty King George the Second, (Note: Market Harborough and Brampton Road Act 1751 (25 Geo. 2. c. 57)) (Note: Market Harborough and Brampton Road Act 1754 (27 Geo. 2. c. 28)) and of an Act passed in the Thirty ninth Year of the Reign of His late Majesty, (Note: Market Harborough and Brampton Road Act 1799 (39 Geo. 3. c. l)) for repairing the Road leading from Market Harborough, in the County of Leicester, to the Pound in the Parish of Brampton, in the County of Huntingdon. (Repealed by Road from Market Harborough to Brampton (Huntingdonshire) Road Act 1841 (4 & 5 Vict. c. xxxv))
Asthall and Buckland Road Act 1820 (repealed)	1 Geo. 4. c. lxxxi	15 July 1820
An Act to continue the Term and alter and enlarge the Powers of Two Acts of His late Majesty King George the Third, (Note: Asthall to Buckland Road Act 1777 (17 Geo. 3. c. 105)) (Note: Asthall and Buckland Road Act 1799 (39 Geo. 3. c. lxxvi)) for amending the Road leading from the Turnpike Road in the Parish of Asthall in the County of Oxford, to the Turnpike Road at or near Buckland, in the County of Berks. (Repealed by Asthall and Buckland Road Act 1852 (15 & 16 Vict. c. cxxxix))
Witney and Charlbury Roads (Oxfordshire) Act 1820 (repealed)	1 Geo. 4. c. lxxxii	15 July 1820
An Act to continue the Term and alter and enlarge the Powers of an Act of the Fortieth Year of His late Majesty's Reign, (Note: Witney and Woodstock Roads Act 1800 (39 & 40 Geo. 3. c. xvi)) for repairing the Road leading from the Turnpike Road in Witney to the Road on Swerford Heath, and the Road leading from the Road from Woodstock to Birmingham, through Charlbury, to the Road from Chipping Norton to Burford, all in the County of Oxford. (Repealed by Charlbury Roads Act 1855 (18 & 19 Vict. c. lxxxv))
Roads in Renfrew, Lanark and Ayr Act 1820 (repealed)	1 Geo. 4. c. lxxxiii	15 July 1820
An Act to explain and amend an Act (Note: Renfrew, Lanark and Ayr Turnpike Roads Act 1804 (44 Geo. 3. c. lii)) for amending and consolidating several Acts for making and repairing Turnpike Roads in the Counties of Renfrew Lanark and Ayr. (Repealed by Renfrew Roads Act 1825 (6 Geo. 4. c. cviii))
Lanark and Dumbarton Roads and Bridges Act 1820 (repealed)	1 Geo. 4. c. lxxxiv	15 July 1820
An Act for making and maintaining certain Roads and Bridges in the Counties of Lanark and Dumbarton. (Repealed by Statute Law (Repeals) Act 1993 (c. 50))
Roads through Nairn and Auldearn Act 1820 (repealed)	1 Geo. 4. c. lxxxv	15 July 1820
An Act for making and maintaining a Road leading through the Parishes of Nairn and Auldearn, in the County of Nairn; and for converting and regulating the Statute Labour of the said County. (Repealed by Elgin and Nairn Roads and Bridges Act 1863 (26 & 27 Vict. c. ccxiv))
Tilehurst and Theale with North Street Rectories Act 1820	1 Geo. 4. c. lxxxvi	24 July 1820
An Act for erecting Two distinct Rectories within the Rectory and Parish of Tilehurst, in the County of Berks.
Peterhead Water and Improvement Act 1820	1 Geo. 4. c. lxxxvii	24 July 1820
An Act for supplying the Town of Peterhead, in the County of Aberdeen, with Water; and for better lighting, paving and otherwise improving the Streets, Roads and Avenues within and leading to and from the said Town.
Glasgow Improvement Act 1820	1 Geo. 4. c. lxxxviii	24 July 1820
An Act for amending an Act of His late Majesty King George the Third, (Note: Lanarkshire Roads and Statute Labour and Clyde Bridge at Howford Act 1807 (47 Geo. 3 Sess. 2. c. xlv)) relating to the Conversion of the Statute Labour within the Royalty of Glasgow; and another Act of His said late Majesty, (Note: Glasgow City Extension and Improvement Act 1800 (39 & 40 Geo. 3. c. lxxxviii)) relating to the Sale of Live Cattle in the City of Glasgow; and for opening certain Streets, and otherwise improving the said City.
British Gallery of Pictures Act 1820	1 Geo. 4. c. lxxxix	24 July 1820
An Act to extend and amend an Act, passed in the Fifty seventh Year of His late Majesty, (Note: British Gallery of Pictures Act 1817 (57 Geo. 3. c. 61)) to enable Peltro William Tomkins Engraver, to dispose of his Collection of Paintings, Drawings, and Engravings, together with several Copies of certain Books therein mentioned, and the Lease of the Premises called The British Gallery of Pictures, by way of Lottery.
Dundalk and Newry Road Act 1820	1 Geo. 4. c. xc	24 July 1820
An Act to continue the Term of and amend an Act of His late Majesty, (Note: Dundalk to Bannbridge Road Act 1783 (23 & 24 Geo. 3. c. 27 (I))) for repairing the Road from Dundalk, in the County of Louth, to Bannbridge, in the County of Down, so far as relates to the Southern Division of the said Road.

=== Private acts ===
Short title	Citation	Royal assent
Long title
Madocks's Estate Act 1820	1 Geo. 4. c. 1 Pr.	22 June 1820
An Act for vesting Parts of the Settled Estates of John Madocks Esquire, in the County of Denbigh, in Trustees, to be sold; and for purchasing other Estates, to be settled to the same Uses.
Blo' Norton Inclosure Act 1820	1 Geo. 4. c. 2 Pr.	22 June 1820
An Act for inclosing Lands within the Parish of Blo' Norton, in the County of Norfolk.
Langsett Inclosure Act 1820	1 Geo. 4. c. 3 Pr.	22 June 1820
An Act for rendering more effectual an Act passed in the Fifty first Year of the Reign of His late Majesty King George the Third, intituled "An Act for inclosing Lands in the Township of Langset otherwise Langside, in the Parish of Peniston, in the West Riding of the County of York," (Note: Langsett Inclosure Act 1811 (51 Geo. 3. c. clxiii)) so far as regards the Allotment to William Payne Esquire.
Millom Inclosure Act 1820	1 Geo. 4. c. 4 Pr.	22 June 1820
An Act for inclosing Lands within the Manor and Parish of Millom, in the County of Cumberland.
Smisby Inclosure Act 1820	1 Geo. 4. c. 5 Pr.	22 June 1820
An Act for inclosing Lands in the Parish of Smisby, in the County of Derby.
Tibenham and Moulton Inclosure Act 1820	1 Geo. 4. c. 6 Pr.	22 June 1820
An Act for inclosing Lands within the Parishes of Tibenham and Moulton, in the County of Norfolk.
Darton Inclosure Act 1820	1 Geo. 4. c. 7 Pr.	22 June 1820
An Act for inclosing Lands in the Parish of Darton, in the West Riding of the County of York.
Golcar Inclosure Act 1820	1 Geo. 4. c. 8 Pr.	22 June 1820
An Act for inclosing Lands in the Manor of Golcar, in the Parish of Huddersfield, in the West Riding of the County of York.
Skelding Moor Inclosure Act 1820	1 Geo. 4. c. 9 Pr.	22 June 1820
An Act for inclosing a certain Common or Waste Ground called Skelding Moor, situate in the Parishes of Urswick and Aldingham, in the County Palatine of Lancaster.
Great Barford Inclosure Act 1820	1 Geo. 4. c. 10 Pr.	23 June 1820
An Act for inclosing Lands in the Parish of Great Barford, in the County of Bedford.
Wenham Inclosure Act 1820	1 Geo. 4. c. 11 Pr.	23 June 1820
An Act for inclosing Lands within the Manor of Wenham, in the Parish of Rogate, in the County of Sussex.
Wootton Bassett Inclosure Act 1820	1 Geo. 4. c. 12 Pr.	23 June 1820
An Act for inclosing Lands in the Tythings of Woodshaw, Greenhill, and Nore Marsh, in the Parish of Wootton Bassett, in the County of Wilts.
Richmond Charity Estates Act 1820	1 Geo. 4. c. 13 Pr.	30 June 1820
An Act to enable the Trustees for the time being of certain Charity Estates, situate in the Parish of Richmond, in the County of Surry, to grant building, repairing and other Leases thereof.
Selley Inclosure Act 1820	1 Geo. 4. c. 14 Pr.	30 June 1820
An Act for inclosing Lands in the Township of Selley, in the Parish of Llanvair Waterdine, in the County of Salop.
Great Leighs Inclosure Act 1820	1 Geo. 4. c. 15 Pr.	30 June 1820
An Act for inclosing Lands within the Parish of Great Leighs, and the Hamlet of Chatley, in the said Parish in the County of Essex.
Eye Inclosure Act 1820	1 Geo. 4. c. 16 Pr.	30 June 1820
An Act for inclosing Lands within the Parish of Eye in the County of Northampton; and for exonerating the same from Tithes.
Preston-Candover, &c. Inclosure Act 1820	1 Geo. 4. c. 17 Pr.	30 June 1820
An Act for inclosing Lands within the several Parishes and Manors of Preston Candover and Nutley, in the County of Southampton.
Princes Risborough Inclosure Act 1820	1 Geo. 4. c. 18 Pr.	30 June 1820
An Act for inclosing Lands in the Parish of Princes Risborough, in the County of Buckingham.
Holden's Estate Act 1820	1 Geo. 4. c. 19 Pr.	8 July 1820
An Act for vesting Part of the Settled Estates of Robert Holden Esquire, situate at Darley near Derby, in the County of Derby, in Trust, to be sold; and for laying out the Purchase Money in other Estates, to be settled to the same Uses.
Viscount Clive's Estate Act 1820	1 Geo. 4. c. 20 Pr.	8 July 1820
An Act for vesting Parts of the Settled Estates of the Right Honourable Edward Herbert, commonly called Viscount Clive, in Trustees, upon Trust to sell; and for laying out the Monies arising from such Sales in the Purchase of more convenient Estates.
Drigg Inclosure Act 1820	1 Geo. 4. c. 21 Pr.	8 July 1820
An Act for inclosing Lands within the Parish of Drigg, in the County of Cumberland.
Pennington Inclosure Act 1820	1 Geo. 4. c. 22 Pr.	8 July 1820
An Act for inclosing Lands in the Parish of Pennington, in the County of Lancaster.
Chilfrome Inclosure Act 1820	1 Geo. 4. c. 23 Pr.	8 July 1820
An Act for inclosing Lands in the Parish of Chilfrome, in the County of Dorset.
Naseby Inclosure Act 1820	1 Geo. 4. c. 24 Pr.	8 July 1820
An Act for inclosing, and exonerating from Tithes, Lands in the Parish of Naseby, in the County of Northampton.
Oakham Inclosure Act 1820	1 Geo. 4. c. 25 Pr.	8 July 1820
An Act for inclosing, and exonerating from Tithes, Lands within the Parish of Oakham in the County of Rutland.
South Duffield Inclosure Act 1820	1 Geo. 4. c. 26 Pr.	8 July 1820
An Act for inclosing Lands in the Township of South Duffield, in the Parish of Hemingbrough, in the East Riding of the County of York.
Farnham and Bishops Stortford Inclosure Act 1820	1 Geo. 4. c. 27 Pr.	8 July 1820
An Act for inclosing Lands in the Parishes of Farnham, in the County of Essex, and of Bishop Stortford, in the County of Hertford.
Little Marlow Inclosure Act 1820	1 Geo. 4. c. 28 Pr.	8 July 1820
An Act for dividing, allotting and inclosing the Open and Common Fields, Common Meadows, Common Pastures, Commons and Waste Lands, within the Parish of Little Marlow, in the County of Buckingham.
Blakeney, &c. Inclosure Act 1820	1 Geo. 4. c. 29 Pr.	8 July 1820
An Act for inclosing Lands within the Parishes of Blakeney, Wiveton and Glandford, in the County of Norfolk.
Walsoken Inclosure Act 1820	1 Geo. 4. c. 30 Pr.	8 July 1820
An Act for dividing, allotting, and inclosing the Commons and Waste Lands in the Parish of Walsoken, in the County of Norfolk.
Benefield Inclosure Act 1820	1 Geo. 4. c. 31 Pr.	8 July 1820
An Act for inclosing, and exonerating from Tithes, Lands in the Parish of Benefield, in the County of Northampton.
Walcott Charity Estates Act 1820	1 Geo. 4. c. 32 Pr.	15 July 1820
An Act for vesting one Moiety of the Walcott Charity Estates, situate in the Parish of Saint Mary Lambeth, in the County of Surrey, in Trustees, for the Benefit of the said Charity, and for other Purposes therein mentioned.
St. John's College Estate Act 1820	1 Geo. 4. c. 33 Pr.	15 July 1820
An Act for enabling the President and Scholars of Saint John Baptist College, in the University of Oxford, to sell and convey to the Trustees of the Will of Doctor John Radcliffe, a Piece of Ground in the Parish of Saint Giles in the Suburbs of the City of Oxford, and the Observatory and other Buildings thereon; and for laying out the Purchase Money in the Purchase of Lands; and for other Purposes.
Gunter's Estate Act 1820	1 Geo. 4. c. 34 Pr.	15 July 1820
An Act to enable the Trustees and Devisees of the Will of James Gunter deceased, to grant Leases of Lands in the Parishes of Saint Luke, Chelsea, Fulham, and Kensington, otherwise Saint Mary Abbotts, Kensington, in the County of Middlesex, in pursuance of Two Contracts entered into by the said James Gunter in his Lifetime; and to grant other Leases under certain Conditions and Restrictions.
King's College Cambridge Estate Act 1820	1 Geo. 4. c. 35 Pr.	15 July 1820
An Act for effecting an Exchange between the Provost and Scholars of the King's College of Blessed Mary and St. Nicholas of Cambridge, and Wyrley Birch Esquire, of Estates in the County of Norfolk.
Duke of Portland's Estate Act 1820	1 Geo. 4. c. 36 Pr.	15 July 1820
An Act for confirming and establishing the Settlement made by the Most Noble William Henry Cavendish Scott Duke of Portland, in pursuance of a Proviso contained in an Indenture or Articles executed previously to his Marriage with Henrietta Scott, now Duchess of Portland.
Bond's Estate Act 1820	1 Geo. 4. c. 37 Pr.	15 July 1820
An Act for vesting the Manor of Hendon, and other Estates devised by the Will of John Bond Esquire, deceased, in other Trustees, to be sold; and for enfranchising Copyhold Estates holden of the said Manor; and for applying the Produce upon the Trusts declared by the said Will.
Vernon's Estate Act 1820	1 Geo. 4. c. 38 Pr.	15 July 1820
An Act for enabling the Trustees appointed by the Will of John Vernon Esquire, deceased, to sell certain Parts of the Estates thereby devised, for the Purposes in the Act mentioned.
Beauvoir's Estate Act 1820	1 Geo. 4. c. 39 Pr.	15 July 1820
An Act for making effectual the Sale of Part of the Estates comprised in the Settlement made upon the Marriage of Osmond Beauvoir Doctor in Divinity, and Mary Sharpe, Spinster, both deceased.
Shrewsbury Estate Act 1820	1 Geo. 4. c. 40 Pr.	15 July 1820
An Act for preventing the Right Honourable Charles Earl of Shrewsbury, and other Persons claiming under the Act (Note: Shrewsbury Estate Act 1720 (6 Geo. 1. c. 29 Pr.)) for entailing certain Estates with the Earldom of Shrewsbury, from disturbing a certain Partition heretofore made of a small Part of those Estates by George late Earl of Shrewsbury.
Dean of St. Paul's Estate Act 1820	1 Geo. 4. c. 41 Pr.	15 July 1820
An Act for confirming a Lease granted by the Dean of Saint Paul, London, to Sir John Osborn Baronet, and John Burt Esquire, dated the Twenty ninth Day of January One thousand eight hundred and fourteen; and for establishing certain derivative Leases granted by the Lessees.
Fergusson's Estate Act 1820	1 Geo. 4. c. 42 Pr.	15 July 1820
An Act for enabling Sir James Fergusson of Kilkerran, Baronet, or the Heir of Entail in Possession of the Lands and Estate of Kilkerran, in the County of Ayr, under and by virtue of a certain Deed of Entail made by Sir Adam Fergusson of Kilkerran, Baronet, deceased, to exchange certain Parts of the Lands of Mochrumhill, the Lands of Caldwallstone, and others contained in the said Deed of Entail, for certain Parts of the Lands of Aird, and for the Lands of Glenshalloch and others, to be vested in the said Sir James Fergusson and the Heirs called to succeed to the said Lands of Mochrumhill and others, by the said Deed of Entail, and under the Conditions and Limitations contained in the said Deed.
Duke of Norfolk's Estate Act 1820	1 Geo. 4. c. 43 Pr.	15 July 1820
An Act for establishing an Exchange of Lands in the County of Hereford, agreed upon between the Most Noble Charles late Duke of Norfolk and the late William Matthews Esquire, with the Concurrence of the Committees of the Person and Estate of the Duchess Dowager of Norfolk, a Lunatic.
Cherhill Inclosure Act 1820	1 Geo. 4. c. 44 Pr.	15 July 1820
An Act for dividing and allotting Lands in the Parish of Cherhill, and certain Common Meadows and Common Field Lands in that Parish, and in the Parishes of Calne, Calstone-Wellington and Compton Bassett, in the County of Wilts.
Dunn's Estate Act 1820	1 Geo. 4. c. 45 Pr.	24 July 1820
An Act to enable the Trustees therein named to make Exchange of certain Messuages, Tenements and Lands, in the County of Pembroke, comprised in the Will of John Dunn Esquire, deceased, for other Estates, situate at East Moor in the said County of Pembroke.
West's Estate Act 1820	1 Geo. 4. c. 46 Pr.	24 July 1820
An Act for empowering the Trustees of certain Estates devised by the Will of Sarah West Widow, deceased, to sell the same for the Purpose of discharging a Mortgage thereon, and for laying out the Residue of the Money arising therefrom, under the Direction of the High Court of Chancery, in the Purchase of other Estates, to be settled to the same Uses.
Viscount Hawarden's Estate Act 1820	1 Geo. 4. c. 47 Pr.	24 July 1820
An Act for vesting the Kilkenny Estate (being Part of the Settled Estates of the Right Honourable Cornwallis Viscount Hawarden) in Trustees to be sold, and for applying the Purchase Money in satisfying the Charges and Incumbrances affecting the said Kilkenny Estate, and also the Tipperary Estate (being an Estate settled to the same Uses), and for laying out the Surplus in the Purchase of other Estates in or near the County of Tipperary, to be settled to the existing Uses of the Kilkenny and Tipperary Estates.
See of Canterbury's Estate Act 1820	1 Geo. 4. c. 48 Pr.	24 July 1820
An Act to explain and amend an Act, passed in the Forty seventh Year of the Reign of His late Majesty, intituled "An Act for vesting certain Estates belonging to the See of Canterbury in Trustees, for Sale, and for applying the Purchase Monies, together with other Monies, in the Manner therein mentioned; and for enabling the Archbishop of Canterbury to grant Building and Repairing Leases; and for other Purposes;" (Note: See of Canterbury's Estate Act 1807 (47 Geo. 3 Sess. 2. c. cxxviii)) and also for granting further Powers to the Archbishop for the time being, in reference to such Leases; and also for enabling the Archbishop for the time being to grant Leases for working certain Veins of Coal belonging to the See of Canterbury.
Stratton's Estate Act 1820	1 Geo. 4. c. 49 Pr.	24 July 1820
An Act for vesting the Manor and Estate of Hawling in the County of Gloucester, belonging to John Locke Stratton an Infant, in Trustees to be sold; and for applying the Money to arise by Sale, after Payment of Incumbrances, in the Purchase of other Estates for the Benefit of the Infant.
Cotter's Estate Act 1820	1 Geo. 4. c. 50 Pr.	25 July 1820
An Act for establishing the Deed of Conveyance and Assignment executed by Sir James Lawrence Cotter Baronet, Richard Kellett, Sir Richard Kellett Baronet, and William Augustus Kellett, late Bankers in the City of Cork, for the Benefit of their Creditors; and for obviating and removing certain Doubts relative to the Validity thereof; and for facilitating the Performance of the Trusts thereby declared.
Earl of Winchilsea's Indemnity Act 1820 (Note: This act was not printed by the King's Printer.)	1 Geo. 4. c. 51 Pr.	6 June 1820
An Act to relieve George Earl of Winchilsea and Nottingham from certain Disabilities, in consequence of his having sat and voted in the House of Peers without being duly qualified, by taking the Oaths and making the Declaration prescribed by Law, and subscribing the same respectively.
Temple Newsam Inclosure Act 1820	1 Geo. 4. c. 52 Pr.	22 June 1820
An Act for inclosing Lands in the Manor of Temple Newsam, in the Parish of Whitkirk, in the West Riding of the County of York.
Whinfell Inclosure Act 1820	1 Geo. 4. c. 53 Pr.	22 June 1820
An Act for inclosing Lands within the Manor of Whinfell, in the Parish of Brigham, in the County of Cumberland.
Codsall Inclosure Act 1820	1 Geo. 4. c. 54 Pr.	22 June 1820
An Act for inclosing Lands in the Parish of Codsall, in the County of Stafford.
Holme next the Sea Inclosure Act 1820	1 Geo. 4. c. 55 Pr.	22 June 1820
An Act for inclosing Lands in the Parish of Holme next the Sea, in the County of Norfolk.
Massingberd's Naturalization Act 1820	1 Geo. 4. c. 56 Pr.	22 June 1820
An Act for naturalizing Marie Jeanne Massingberd.
D'Egville's Naturalization Act 1820	1 Geo. 4. c. 57 Pr.	22 June 1820
An Act for naturalizing James Hervet d'Egville.
Harms' Naturalization Act 1820	1 Geo. 4. c. 58 Pr.	22 June 1820
An Act for naturalizing John Henry Garey Harms.
Rackwitz's Naturalization Act 1820	1 Geo. 4. c. 59 Pr.	22 June 1820
An Act for naturalizing Samuel Rackwitz.
Chessington Inclosure Act 1820	1 Geo. 4. c. 60 Pr.	30 June 1820
An Act for inclosing Lands in the Chapelry or Hamlet of Chessington, in the County of Surrey.
South Stoneham Inclosure Act 1820	1 Geo. 4. c. 61 Pr.	8 July 1820
An Act for allotting and inclosing certain Open and Common Meadows in the Parishes of Bishopstoke and South Stoneham, in the County of Southampton, and certain Commonable and Waste Lands in the Manors or Tithings of Bishopstoke, Great Allington, Little Allington, and the Honour of Ewelme, in the same Parishes.
Haseley Inclosure Act 1820	1 Geo. 4. c. 62 Pr.	8 July 1820
An Act for allotting Lands within the Township or Liberty of Great Haseley, in the Parish of Haseley, in the County of Oxford.
Ritterspack's Naturalization Act 1820	1 Geo. 4. c. 63 Pr.	8 July 1820
An Act for naturalizing Frederick Andreus Ritterspack.
Upper and Lower Gravenhurst, &c. Inclosure Act 1820	1 Geo. 4. c. 64 Pr.	15 July 1820
An Act for inclosing Lands within the Parishes of Upper Gravenhurst, Lower Gravenhurst, and Upper Stondon, in the County of Bedford.
Riemers' Naturalization Act 1820	1 Geo. 4. c. 65 Pr.	15 July 1820
An Act for naturalizing John Christian Henry Reimers.
Pellew's Divorce Act 1820	1 Geo. 4. c. 66 Pr.	24 July 1820
An Act for dissolving the Marriage of Pownoll Bastard Pellew, Esquire, commonly called the Honourable Bastard Pellew, eldest son and heir apparent of the Right Honourable Edward Lord Viscount Exmouth, with Eliza Harriet Pellew, his now wife, and to enable him to marry again, and for other purposes therein mentioned.
Kramer's Naturalization Act 1820	1 Geo. 4. c. 67 Pr.	24 July 1820
An Act for naturalizing Christian Kramer.
Lord Harborough's Indemnity Act 1820	1 Geo. 4. c. 68 Pr.	23 November 1820
An Act to relieve Robert Earl of Harborough from certain disabilities and penalties, in consequence of his having sat and voted in the House of Peers without being duly qualified, by taking the Oaths and making the Declaration prescribed by Law, and subscribing the same respectively.

=== Sources ===
- "1° Geo. IV.". The Statutes of the United Kingdom of Great Britain and Ireland, 60 Geo. III. & 1 Geo. IV. 1819-1820. And 1 Geo. IV. 1820. London. 1820. pp. 68–574 – via Google Books.
- Journals of the House of Commons. Vol. 75: Sess. 1819-20 and 1820. London: His Majesty's Stationery Office. pp. 107–485 – via Google Books.
- Chronological Table of and Index to the Statutes. Vol. 1: To the End of the Session 59 Vict. Sess. 2 (1895) (13th ed.). London: Her Majesty's Stationery Office. 1896. pp. 227–229 – via Google Books.

== See also ==
- List of acts of the Parliament of the United Kingdom
