= Army Prize Money Act 1832 =

Act of the Parliament of the United Kingdom

Army Prize Money Act 1832 (Note: The citation of this act by this short title was authorised by section 1 of, and the first schedule to, the Short Titles Act 1896. Due to the repeal of those provisions it is now authorised by section 19(2) of the Interpretation Act 1978.)
- Act of Parliament
- Parliament of the United Kingdom
- Long title: An Act for consolidating and amending the Laws relating to the Payment of Army Prize Money.
- Citation: 2 & 3 Will. 4. c. 53
- Territorial extent: United Kingdom

Dates
- Royal assent: 23 June 1832
- Commencement: 23 June 1832 (Note: The Acts of Parliament (Commencement) Act 1793.)
- Repealed: 29 July 1959
Other legislation
Amends	See § Repealed enactments
Repeals/revokes	See § Repealed enactments
Amended by	Post Office (Repeal of Laws) Act 1837; False Oaths (Scotland) Act 1933
Repealed by	Statute Law Revision Act 1959
Relates to	Army Act 1832

Status: Repealed

Text of statute as originally enacted

The Army Prize Money Act 1832 (2 & 3 Will. 4. c. 53) was an act of the Parliament of the United Kingdom that consolidated enactments related to army prize money in the United Kingdom.

== Provisions ==
=== Repealed enactments ===
Section 1 of the act repealed 6 enactments, listed in that section.

Citation	Short title	Description	Extent of repeal
54 Geo. 3. c. 86	Army Prize Money Act 1814	An Act passed in the Fifty-fourth Year of the Reign of His Majesty King George the Third, intituled An Act for regulating the Payment of Army Prize Money, and to provide for the Payment of unclaimed and forfeited Shares to Chelsea Hospital.	The whole act.
57 Geo. 3. c. 77	Army Prize Money, etc. Act 1817	An Act passed in the Fifty-seventh Year of the Reign of His late Majesty King George the Third, intituled An Act for extending the Provisions of an Act of the Fifty-fourth Year of His present Majesty, for regulating the Payment of Army Prize Money; and for authorizing the Commissioners of Chelsea Hospital to suspend the Pension of such Persons as shall be guilty of Frauds in respect of Prize Money or Pensions.	The whole act.
58 Geo. 3. c. 73	Payment of Regimental Debts Act 1818	An Act passed in the Fifty-eighth Year of the Reign of His late Majesty King George the Third, intituled An Act for regulating the Payment of Regimental Debts the Distribution of the Effects of Officers and Soldiers dying in Service, and the Receipt of Sums due to Soldiers.	As enacts, that from and after the Twenty-fourth Day of July One thousand eight hundred and eighteen it shall not be lawful for any Agent or Agents appointed for the Distribution of Army Prize or Bounty Money, Grant or other Allowances of Money in the Nature thereof, or for the Treasurer of Chelsea Hospital, to pay the Share of any Non-commissioned Officer or Soldier to any Person or Persons whatsoever other than the Non-commissioned Officer or Soldier entitled to the same, or to the next of Kin or Executor or Administrator of such Non-commissioned Officer or Soldier, or to the Agent of any Regiment, Battalion, or Corps of His Majesty's Army or Militia, duly authorized by the Party entitled thereto to receive the same; and also so much of the said Act as enacts, that it shall not be lawful for the Agent appointed for the Distribution of Army Prize or Bounty Money, Grants or other Allowances of Money in the Nature thereof, or for the Treasurer of Chelsea Hospital, to pay to any Creditor taking out Letters of Administration to a deceased Non-commissioned Officer or Soldier, out of the Share of such deceased Non-commissioned Officer or Soldier, any further or greater Sum than shall appear, by Affidavit to be made by the Person taking out Letters of Administration, to be due to him at the Time of taking out such Letters of Administration
1 Geo. 4. c. 84	Army Prize Money Act 1820	An Act passed in the First Year of the Reign of His late Majesty King George the Fourth, intituled AnAct to regulate the Payment of Army Prize Money.	The whole act.
4 Geo. 4. c. 65	Distribution of Prize Money Act 1823	An Act passed in the Fourth Year of the Reign of His late Majesty King George the Fourth, intituled An Act to extend Two Acts of His late Majesty for Distribution ofPrize Money to all Cases of Capture that have been made by Foreign Ships or Land Forces in conjunction with His Majesty's Ships or Land Forces.	The whole act.
5 Geo. 4. c. 107	Chelsea Hospital Act 1824	An Act passed in the Fifth Year of the Reign of His late Majesty, intituled An Act to prevent the illegal pawning of Clothes and Stores belonging to Chelsea Hospital; to give further Powers to the Treasurer and Deputy Treasurer of Chelsea and Greenwich Hospitals to punish Persons fraudulently receiving Prize Money or Pensions ; and to enable the Commissioners of Chelsea Hospital to hold Lands purchased under the Will of Colonel Drowley.	The whole act.

== Subsequent developments ==
The act was described as a statute of practical utility.

The whole act was repealed by section 2 of, and the second schedule to, the Statute Law Revision Act 1959 (7 & 8 Eliz. 2. c. 68), which came into force on 29 July 1959.
