= Hiring of Ships by East India Company Act 1818 =

Act of the Parliament of the United Kingdom

- Act of Parliament
- Parliament of the United Kingdom
- Long title: An Act to amend and reduce into One Act the several Laws relating to the manner in which the East India Company are required to hire Ships.
- Citation: 58 Geo. 3. c. 83
- Territorial extent: United Kingdom

Dates
- Royal assent: 5 June 1818
- Commencement: 5 June 1818 (Note: The Acts of Parliament (Commencement) Act 1793.)
- Repealed: 5 August 1873
Other legislation
Repeals/revokes	See § Repealed enactments
Repealed by	Statute Law Revision Act 1873

Status: Repealed

Text of statute as originally enacted

The Hiring of Ships by East India Company Act 1818 (58 Geo. 3. c. 83) was an act of the Parliament of the United Kingdom that consolidated enactments related to the hiring of ships by the East India Company.

== Provisions ==
=== Repealed enactments ===
Section 1 of the act repealed 3 enactments, listed in that section. The repeal did not affect any contract or agreement made or entered into under or in pursuance of any of the repealed acts, which were to be carried into execution as if the act had not been passed.

Citation	Short title	Description	Extent of repeal
39 Geo. 3. c. 89	East India Company Act 1799	An Act for regulating the Manner in which the United Company of Merchants of England trading to the East Indies, shall hire and take up Ships for their regular Service.	The whole act.
50 Geo. 3. c. 86	East India Company Act 1810	An Act to amend Two Acts passed in the Thirty-ninth and Forty-third Years of His present Majesty, for regulating the Manner in which the East India Company shall hire and take up Ships.	The whole act.
51 Geo. 3. c. 75	East India Company Act 1811	An Act for making further Provision for the Payment of Salaries and other Charges in the Office of the Commissioners for the Affairs of India; and for enabling the East India Company to restore to the Service of the said Company, Military Officers removed therefrom by Sentences of Courts Martial; and to authorize the said Company, in Cases of unforeseen Emergency, to take up Ships by private Contract.	So much of the act as relates to the hiring of ships by the East India Company.

== Subsequent developments ==
The whole act was repealed by section 1 of, and the schedule to, the Statute Law Revision Act 1873 (36 & 37 Vict. c. 91), which came into force on 5 August 1873.
