= Army Act 1818 =

Act of the Parliament of the United Kingdom

- Act of Parliament
- Parliament of the United Kingdom
- Long title: An Act to consolidate and amend the Provisions of several Acts, passed in the Fifty first and Fifty second Years respectively of the Reign of His present Majesty, for enabling Wives and Families of Soldiers to return to their Homes.
- Citation: 58 Geo. 3. c. 92
- Territorial extent: United Kingdom

Dates
- Royal assent: 10 June 1818
- Commencement: 10 June 1818 (Note: The Acts of Parliament (Commencement) Act 1793.)
- Repealed: 9 August 1832
Other legislation
Amends	Army Act 1811; Army Act 1812; Army Act (No. 2) 1812
Repealed by	Army Act 1832

Status: Repealed

Text of statute as originally enacted

The Army Act 1818 (58 Geo. 3. c. 92) was an act of the Parliament of the United Kingdom that consolidated several acts related to the housing of soldier's wives and widows.

The act governed the removal of military families, and appeals against such actions.

== Provisions ==
Section 1 of the act repealed the Army Act 1811 (51 Geo. 3. c. 106), the Army Act 1812 (52 Geo. 3. c. 27) and the Army Act (No. 2) 1812 (c. 120) except as to the paying, reimbursing or accounting for any money under those acts.

== Subsequent developments ==
The whole act, in addition to the acts amended by this act, was repealed by section 1 of the Army Act 1832 (2 & 3 Will. 4. c. 97), which came into force on 9 August 1832.
