= Army Act 1832 =

Act of the Parliament of the United Kingdom

- Act of Parliament
- Parliament of the United Kingdom
- Long title: An Act to repeal several Acts for enabling the Wives and Families of Soldiers, and the Widows and Families of deceased Soldiers, to return to their Homes.
- Citation: 2 & 3 Will. 4. c. 97
- Territorial extent: United Kingdom

Dates
- Royal assent: 9 August 1832
- Commencement: 9 August 1832 (Note: The Acts of Parliament (Commencement) Act 1793.)
- Repealed: 16 July 1874
Other legislation
Repeals/revokes	Army Act 1811; Army Act 1812; Army Act (No. 2) 1812; Army Act 1818
Repealed by	Statute Law Revision Act 1874
Relates to	Army Prize Money Act 1832

Status: Repealed

Text of statute as originally enacted

The Army Act 1832 (2 & 3 Will. 4. c. 97) was an act of the Parliament of the United Kingdom that repealed several acts related to the housing of soldier's wives and widows.

== Provisions ==
Section 1 of the act repealed the Army Act 1811 (51 Geo. 3. c. 106), the Army Act 1812 (52 Geo. 3. c. 27), the Army Act (No. 2) 1812 (c. 120) and the Army Act 1818 (58 Geo. 3. c. 92), from the passing of the act.

== Subsequent developments ==
The act was described as a statute of practical utility.

The whole act was repealed by section 1 of, and the schedule to, the Statute Law Revision Act 1874 (37 & 38 Vict. c. 35), which came into force on 16 July 1874.
