= List of acts of the Parliament of the United Kingdom from 1818 =

This is a complete list of acts of the Parliament of the United Kingdom for the year 1818.

Note that the first parliament of the United Kingdom was held in 1801; parliaments between 1707 and 1800 were either parliaments of Great Britain or of Ireland). For acts passed up until 1707, see the list of acts of the Parliament of England and the list of acts of the Parliament of Scotland. For acts passed from 1707 to 1800, see the list of acts of the Parliament of Great Britain. See also the list of acts of the Parliament of Ireland.

For acts of the devolved parliaments and assemblies in the United Kingdom, see the list of acts of the Scottish Parliament, the list of acts of the Northern Ireland Assembly, and the list of acts and measures of Senedd Cymru; see also the list of acts of the Parliament of Northern Ireland.

The number shown after each act's title is its chapter number. Acts passed before 1963 are cited using this number, preceded by the year(s) of the reign during which the relevant parliamentary session was held; thus the Union with Ireland Act 1800 is cited as "39 & 40 Geo. 3 c. 67", meaning the 67th act passed during the session that started in the 39th year of the reign of George III and which finished in the 40th year of that reign. Note that the modern convention is to use Arabic numerals in citations (thus "41 Geo. 3" rather than "41 Geo. III"). Acts of the last session of the Parliament of Great Britain and the first session of the Parliament of the United Kingdom are both cited as "41 Geo. 3". Acts passed from 1963 onwards are simply cited by calendar year and chapter number.

All modern acts have a short title, e.g. "the Local Government Act 2003". Some earlier acts also have a short title given to them by later acts, such as by the Short Titles Act 1896.

== 58 Geo. 3 ==
The sixth session of the 5th Parliament of the United Kingdom, which met from 27 January 1818 until 10 June 1818.

This session was also traditionally cited as 58 G. 3.

=== Public general acts ===
Short title	Citation	Royal assent
Long title
Habeas Corpus Suspension Act 1818 (repealed)	58 Geo. 3. c. 1	31 January 1818
An Act to repeal an Act made in the last Session of Parliament, intituled "An Act to continue an Act to empower His Majesty to secure and detain such Persons as His Majesty shall suspect are conspiring against His Person and Government." (Note: Habeas Corpus Suspension Act 1817 (57 Geo. 3. c. 3)) (Repealed by Statute Law Revision Act 1873 (36 & 37 Vict. c. 91))
Grand Jury Presentments (Ireland) Act 1818 (repealed)	58 Geo. 3. c. 2	18 February 1818
An Act to suspend, until the End of the present Session of Parliament, the Operation of an Act made in the last Session of Parliament, (Note: Grand Jury Presentments (Ireland) Act 1817 (57 Geo. 3. c. 107)) to provide for the more deliberate Investigation of Presentments to be made by Grand Juries for Roads and Public Works in Ireland, and for accounting for Money raised by such Presentments. (Repealed by Statute Law Revision Act 1873 (36 & 37 Vict. c. 91))
Duties on Malt, etc. Act 1818 (repealed)	58 Geo. 3. c. 3	23 February 1818
An Act for continuing to His Majesty certain Duties on Malt, Sugar, Tobacco and Snuff, in Great Britain; and on Pensions, Offices and Personal Estates, in England; for the Service of the Year One thousand eight hundred and eighteen. (Repealed by Statute Law Revision Act 1873 (36 & 37 Vict. c. 91))
Exchequer Bills Act 1818 (repealed)	58 Geo. 3. c. 4	23 February 1818
An Act for raising the Sum of Thirty Millions, by Exchequer Bills, for the Service of the Year One thousand eight hundred and eighteen. (Repealed by Statute Law Revision Act 1873 (36 & 37 Vict. c. 91))
Indemnity Act 1818 (repealed)	58 Geo. 3. c. 5	17 March 1818
An Act to indemnify such Persons in the United Kingdom as have omitted to qualify themselves for Offices and Employments, and for extending the time limited for those Purposes respectively, until the Twenty fifth Day of March One thousand eight hundred and nineteen; and to permit such Persons in Great Britain as have omitted to make and file Affidavits of the Execution of Indentures of Clerks to Attornies and Solicitors, to make and file the same on or before the First Day of Hilary Term One thousand eight hundred and nineteen, and to allow Persons to make and file such Affidavits, although the Persons whom they served shall have neglected to take out their Annual Certificate. (Repealed by Promissory Oaths Act 1871 (34 & 35 Vict. c. 48))
Apprehension of Suspected Persons, etc. Act 1818 (repealed)	58 Geo. 3. c. 6	17 March 1818
An Act for indemnifying Persons who, since the Twenty sixth Day of January One thousand eight hundred and seventeen, have acted in apprehending, imprisoning or detaining in Custody Persons suspected of High Treason or Treasonable Practices, and in the Suppression of tumultuous and unlawful Assemblies. (Repealed by Statute Law Revision Act 1873 (36 & 37 Vict. c. 91))
Indemnity, Importation and Exportation Act 1818 (repealed)	58 Geo. 3. c. 7	17 March 1818
An Act to indemnify all Persons who have been concerned in advising, issuing or carrying into Execution any Order or Orders for permitting the Importation and Exportation of certain Goods and Commodities in Foreign Bottoms into and out of certain of His Majesty's West India Islands. (Repealed by Statute Law Revision Act 1873 (36 & 37 Vict. c. 91))
Kilmainham Hospital Act 1818 (repealed)	58 Geo. 3. c. 8	17 March 1818
An Act to authorize the Governors of the Hospital of King Charles the Second for ancient and maimed Officers and Soldiers of the Array of Ireland, (usually called the Royal Hospital at Kilmainham,) to suspend or take away the Pensions of such Pensioners of the said Hospital as shall be guilty of any Fraud in respect of Prize Money or Pensions, or of any other gross Misconduct. (Repealed by Statute Law Revision Act 1861 (24 & 25 Vict. c. 101))
Duties on Madder Act 1818 (repealed)	58 Geo. 3. c. 9	17 March 1818
An Act to further continue, until the Fifth Day of July One thousand eight hundred and eighteen, Two Acts of the Fifty fourth Year of His present Majesty, (Note: Exchequer Bills Act 1813 (54 Geo. 3. c. 26)) (Note: Exchequer Bills (No. 2) Act 1813 (54 Geo. 3. c. 27)) for repealing the Duties of Customs on Madder imported into Great Britain, and for granting other Duties in lieu thereof. (Repealed by Statute Law Revision Act 1873 (36 & 37 Vict. c. 91))
Mutiny Act Amendment, etc. Act 1818 (repealed)	58 Geo. 3. c. 10	17 March 1818
An Act to rectify a Mistake in an Act, passed in the Fifty fifth Year of the Reign of His present Majesty, (Note: Mutiny (No. 2) Act 1815 (55 Geo. 3. c. 108)) for punishing Mutiny and Desertion, and to indemnify certain Persons in relation thereto. (Repealed by Statute Law Revision Act 1873 (36 & 37 Vict. c. 91))
Mutiny Act 1818 (repealed)	58 Geo. 3. c. 11	17 March 1818
An Act for punishing Mutiny and Desertion; and for the better Payment of the Army and their Quarters. (Repealed by Statute Law Revision Act 1873 (36 & 37 Vict. c. 91))
Marine Mutiny Act 1818 (repealed)	58 Geo. 3. c. 12	17 March 1818
An Act for the regulating of His Majesty's Royal Marine Forces while on Shore. (Repealed by Statute Law Revision Act 1873 (36 & 37 Vict. c. 91))
Retailing of Spirits (Scotland) Act 1818 (repealed)	58 Geo. 3. c. 13	19 March 1818
An Act for charging Duties on Licences for retailing Aqua Vitæ in Scotland. (Repealed by Statute Law Revision Act 1861 (24 & 25 Vict. c. 101))
Circulation of Tokens, etc. Act 1818 (repealed)	58 Geo. 3. c. 14	19 March 1818
An Act to amend an Act of the last Session of Parliament, (Note: Tokens (No. 2) Act 1817 (57 Geo. 3. c. 113)) for preventing the further Circulation of Dollars and Tokens issued by the Governor and Company of the Bank of England. (Repealed by Statute Law Revision Act 1873 (36 & 37 Vict. c. 91))
Greenland Fisheries Act 1818 (repealed)	58 Geo. 3. c. 15	19 March 1818
An Act to amend an Act made in the Twenty sixth Year of His present Majesty, (Note: Fisheries Act 1786 (26 Geo. 3. c. 41)) for the Encouragement of the Fisheries carried on in the Greenland Seas and Davis's Streights, so far as relates to the Oaths thereby required to be taken. (Repealed by Statute Law Revision Act 1873 (36 & 37 Vict. c. 91))
Assessed Taxes Act 1818 (repealed)	58 Geo. 3. c. 16	8 May 1818
An Act to continue until the Fifth Day of April One thousand eight hundred and nineteen, and amend an Act of the Fifty sixth Year of His present Majesty, (Note: Assessed Taxes Act 1816 (56 Geo. 3. c. 66)) for reducing the Duties payable on Horses used for the Purposes therein mentioned. (Repealed by Revenue Act 1869 (32 & 33 Vict. c. 14))
Assessed Taxes (No. 2) Act 1818 (repealed)	58 Geo. 3. c. 17	8 May 1818
An Act for charging certain Duties on Four wheeled Carnages constructed and drawn in the manner therein described. (Repealed by Revenue Act 1869 (32 & 33 Vict. c. 14))
Duties on Corks Act 1818 (repealed)	58 Geo. 3. c. 18	8 May 1818
An Act to charge an additional Duty on Corks ready made, imported into Ireland. (Repealed by Statute Law Revision Act 1861 (24 & 25 Vict. c. 101))
Importation and Exportation Act 1818 (repealed)	58 Geo. 3. c. 19	8 May 1818
An Act to allow for Three Years, and until Six Weeks after the Commencement of the then next Session of Parliament, the Importation into Ports specially appointed by His Majesty, within the Provinces of Nova Scotia and New Brunswick, of the Articles therein enumerated, and the Re-exportation thereof from such Ports. (Repealed by Trade Act 1822 (3 Geo. 4. c. 44))
Discovery of Longitude at Sea, etc. Act 1818 (repealed)	58 Geo. 3. c. 20	8 May 1818
An act for more effectually discovering the Longitude at Sea, and encouraging Attempts to find a Northern Passage between the Atlantic and Pacific Oceans, and to approach the Northern Pole. (Repealed by Nautical Almanack Act 1828 (9 Geo. 4. c. 66))
Duties on Glass Act 1818 (repealed)	58 Geo. 3. c. 21	8 May 1818
An Act to revive and continue, until the Fifth Day of July One thousand eight hundred and nineteen, several Laws relating to the Duties on Glass made in Great Britain; and to prohibit the making of Smalts within a certain Distance of any other Glass House, or by the Maker of any other Kind of Glass. (Repealed by Statute Law Revision Act 1861 (24 & 25 Vict. c. 101))
Quartering of Soldiers Act 1818 (repealed)	58 Geo. 3. c. 22	8 May 1818
An Act for fixing the Rates of Subsistence to be paid to Innkeepers and others on quartering Soldiers. (Repealed by Statute Law Revision Act 1873 (36 & 37 Vict. c. 91))
National Debt Act 1818 (repealed)	58 Geo. 3. c. 23	8 May 1818
An Act for raising the Sum of Three Millions, by the Transfer of certain Three Pounds per Centum Annuities into other Annuities, at the Rate of Three Pounds Ten Shillings per Centum; and for granting Annuities to discharge certain Exchequer Bills. (Repealed by Statute Law Revision Act 1870 (33 & 34 Vict. c. 69))
Annuities to Royal Family Act 1818 (repealed)	58 Geo. 3. c. 24	8 May 1818
An Act for enabling His Majesty to make further Provision for His Royal Highness the Duke of Cambridge, and to settle annuity on the Princess of Hesse, in case she shall survive His said Royal Highness. (Repealed by Statute Law Revision Act 1953 (2 & 3 Eliz. 2. c. 5))
Annuity to Duchess of Cumberland Act 1818 (repealed)	58 Geo. 3. c. 25	8 May 1818
An Act for enabling His Majesty to settle an Annuity on Her Royal Highness the Duchess of Cumberland, in case of her surviving His Royal Highness the Duke of Cumberland. (Repealed by Statute Law Revision Act 1873 (36 & 37 Vict. c. 91))
Trade in Spirits Act 1818 (repealed)	58 Geo. 3. c. 26	23 May 1818
An Act to continue, until the Fifth Day of July One thousand, eight hundred and nineteen, Two Acts made in the Fifty fourth (Note: Spirit Trade Act 1814 (54 Geo. 3. c. 149)) and Fifty sixth (Note: Trade in Spirits Act 1816 (56 Geo. 3. c. 105)) Years of His present Majesty's Reign, for regulating the Trade in Spirits between Great Britain and Ireland reciprocally, and to amend the same. (Repealed by Statute Law Revision Act 1873 (36 & 37 Vict. c. 91))
Importation Act 1818 (repealed)	58 Geo. 3. c. 27	23 May 1818
An Act to permit the Importation of certain Articles into His Majesty's Colonies or Plantations in the West Indies, or on the Continent of South America; and also certain Articles into certain Ports in the West Indies. (Repealed by Trade Act 1822 (3 Geo. 4. c. 44))
Spirits (Strength Ascertainment) Act 1818 (repealed)	58 Geo. 3. c. 28	23 May 1818
An Act to repeal an Act made in the Fifty-sixth year of His present Majesty's Reign, (Note: Sikes' Hydrometer Act 1816 (56 Geo. 3. c. 140)) for establishing the Use of an Hydrometer called Sikes's Hydrometer, in ascertaining the Strength of Spirits, instead of Clarke's Hydrometer; and for making other Provisions in lieu thereof. (Repealed by Customs and Excise Act 1952 (15 & 16 Geo. 6 & 1 Eliz. 2. c. 44))
Fees for Pardons Act 1818 or the Fees of Pardons Act 1818 (repealed)	58 Geo. 3. c. 29	23 May 1818
An act for regulating the Payment of Fees for Pardons under the Great Seal. (Repealed for England and Wales by Criminal Law Act 1967 (c. 58), for Northern Ireland by Criminal Law Act (Northern Ireland) 1967 (c. 18 (N.I.)) and for Scotland by Statute Law (Repeals) Act 1973 (c. 39))
Costs Act 1818 (repealed)	58 Geo. 3. c. 30	23 May 1818
An Act for preventing frivolous and vexatious Actions of Assault and Battery, and for slanderous Words in Courts. (Repealed by Administration of Justice Act 1965 (c. 2))
Court Houses (Ireland) Act 1818 (repealed)	58 Geo. 3. c. 31	23 May 1818
An Act to amend an Act passed in the Fifty third Year of His Majesty's Reign, (Note: Court House (Ireland) Act 1813 (53 Geo. 3. c. 131)) to make further Regulations for the building and repairing of Court Houses and Sessions Houses in Ireland. (Repealed by Statute Law Revision Act 1873 (36 & 37 Vict. c. 91), Statute Law Revision Act 1888 (51 & 52 Vict. c. 3), Statute Law Revision (No. 2) Act 1890 (53 & 54 Vict. c. 51) and Administration of Justice Act (Northern Ireland) 1954 (c. 9 (N.I.)))
Houses of Correction (England) Act 1818 (repealed)	58 Geo. 3. c. 32	23 May 1818
An Act to amend so much of an Act of the Fifty fifth Year of His present Majesty, (Note: Chaplains in Gaols, etc. (England) Act 1815 (55 Geo. 3. c. 48)) as relates to the Salaries of Clergymen officiating as Chaplains in Houses of Correction. (Repealed by Statute Law Revision Act 1873 (36 & 37 Vict. c. 91))
Glass Duties Act 1818 (repealed)	58 Geo. 3. c. 33	23 May 1818
An Act to alter the Allowance for broken Plate Glass, and to exempt Manufacturers of certain Glass Wares from Penalties for not being licensed. (Repealed by Statute Law Revision Act 1861 (24 & 25 Vict. c. 101))
Exportation Act 1818 (repealed)	58 Geo. 3. c. 34	23 May 1818
An Act to repeal the several Bounties on the Exportation of refined Sugar from any Part of the United Kingdom, and to allow other Bounties in lieu thereof, until the Fifth Day of July One thousand eight hundred and twenty, and for reducing the Size of the Packages in which refined Sugar may be exported. (Repealed by Customs Law Repeal Act 1825 (6 Geo. 4. c. 105))
Royal Canal Act 1818 (repealed)	58 Geo. 3. c. 35	23 May 1818
An Act to provide for the maintaining of the Royal Canal from the River Liffey to the River Shannon in Ireland. (Repealed by Statute Law (Repeals) Act 1993 (c. 50))
Slave Trade Act 1818 (repealed)	58 Geo. 3. c. 36	28 May 1818
An Act to carry into Execution a Treaty made between His Majesty and the King of Spain, for the preventing Traffic in Slaves. (Repealed by Statute Law Revision Act 1861 (24 & 25 Vict. c. 101))
Restriction on Cash Payments Act 1818 (repealed)	58 Geo. 3. c. 37	28 May 1818
An Act for further continuing, until the Fifth Day of July One thousand eight hundred and nineteen, an Act of the Forty fourth Year of His present Majesty, (Note: Restriction on Cash Payments Act 1803 (44 Geo. 3. c. 1)) to continue the Restrictions, contained in several Acts of His present Majesty, on Payments of Cash by the Bank of England. (Repealed by Statute Law Revision Act 1873 (36 & 37 Vict. c. 91))
Relief of Sailors Abroad Act 1818 (repealed)	58 Geo. 3. c. 38	28 May 1818
An Act to extend and render more effectual the present Regulations for the Relief of Seafaring Men and Boys, Subjects of the United Kingdom of Great Britain and Ireland, in Foreign Parts. (Repealed by Merchant Seamen Act 1835 (5 & 6 Will. 4. c. 19))
Recovery of Tenements, etc. (Ireland) Act 1818 (repealed)	58 Geo. 3. c. 39	28 May 1818
An Act to explain and amend an Act passed in the Fifty sixth Year of the Reign of His present Majesty, (Note: Recovery of Tenements, etc. (Ireland) Act 1816 (56 Geo. 3. c. 88)) for amending the Law of Ireland respecting the Recovery of Tenements from absconding, overholding and defaulting Tenants, and for the Protection of the Tenant from undue Distress. (Repealed by Civil Bill Courts (Ireland) Act 1851 (14 & 15 Vict. c. 57))
Yeomanry Corps. (Ireland) Act 1818 (repealed)	58 Geo. 3. c. 40	28 May 1818
An Act to continue the Laws now in force relating to Yeomanry Corps in Ireland. (Repealed by Statute Law Revision Act 1873 (36 & 37 Vict. c. 91))
Duties on Paper (Ireland) Act 1818 (repealed)	58 Geo. 3. c. 41	28 May 1818
An Act to amend an Act made in the Fifty sixth Year of His present Majesty, (Note: Duties on Paper (Ireland) Act 1816 (56 Geo. 3. c. 78)) for regulating and securing the Collection of the Duties on Paper in Ireland, and to allow a Drawback of the Duty on Paper used in printing certain Books at the Press of Trinity College, Dublin. (Repealed by Statute Law Revision Act 1861 (24 & 25 Vict. c. 101))
Crown Lands at Yarmouth Act 1818 (repealed)	58 Geo. 3. c. 42	28 May 1818
An Act for enabling the Trustee of certain Premises at Great Yarmouth in the County of Norfolk, held in Trust for His Majesty, to execute a Conveyance of the same to a Purchaser thereof. (Repealed by Statute Law Revision Act 1950 (14 Geo. 6. c. 6))
Salmon Fisheries (England) Act 1818 (repealed)	58 Geo. 3. c. 43	28 May 1818
An Act for preventing the Destruction of the Breed of Salmon, and Fish of Salmon Kind, in the Rivers of England. (Repealed by Salmon Fishery Act 1861 (24 & 25 Vict. c. 109))
Glasgow and Carlisle Road Act 1818 (repealed)	58 Geo. 3. c. 44	28 May 1818
An Act to alter the Application of Part of the Sum of Fifty thousand Pounds granted by an Act passed in the Fifty sixth Year of the Reign of His present Majesty, intituled "An Act for improving the Road from the City of Glasgow to the City of Carlisle." (Note: Glasgow and Carlisle Road Improvement Act 1816 (56 Geo. 3. c. lxxxiii)) (Repealed by Statute Law (Repeals) Act 1977 (c. 18))
Church Building Act 1818 or the Million Pound Act (repealed)	58 Geo. 3. c. 45	30 May 1818
An Act for building and promoting the building of additional Churches in populous Parishes. (Repealed by Isle of Man (Church Building and New Parishes) Act 1897 (60 & 61 Vict. c. 33), New Parishes Measure 1943 (No. 1) and Statute Law (Repeals) Act 1974 (c. 22))
Disposition of Certain Money (Ireland) Act 1818 (repealed)	58 Geo. 3. c. 46	30 May 1818
An Act for Relief of Persons entitled to Entailed Estates, to be purchased with Trust Monies, in that Part of the United Kingdom called Ireland. (Repealed by Fines and Recoveries (Ireland) Act 1834 (4 & 5 Will. 4. c. 92))
Hospitals (Ireland) Act 1818 (repealed)	58 Geo. 3. c. 47	30 May 1818
An Act to establish Fever Hospitals, and to make other Regulations for Relief of the suffering Poor, and for preventing the increase of Infectious Fevers in Ireland. (Repealed by Statute Law Revision Act 1873 (36 & 37 Vict. c. 91), Statute Law Revision Act 1888 (51 & 52 Vict. c. 3), Statute Law Revision Act 1890 (53 & 54 Vict. c. 33), Statute Law Revision (No. 2) Act 1890 (53 & 54 Vict. c. 51) and Health Services Act (Northern Ireland) 1948 (c. 3 (N.I.)))
Savings Bank (England) Act 1818 (repealed)	58 Geo. 3. c. 48	30 May 1818
An Act to amend an Act, passed in the last Session of Parliament (Note: Savings Bank (England) Act 1817 (57 Geo. 3. c. 130)) to encourage the Establishment of Banks for Savings, in England. (Repealed by Savings Bank Act 1828 (9 Geo. 4. c. 92))
Slave Trade (No. 2) Act 1818 (repealed)	58 Geo. 3. c. 49	30 May 1818
An Act to explain Three Acts, passed in the Forty sixth, (Note: Slave Trade Act 1806 (46 Geo. 3. c. 52)) Forty seventh (Note: Abolition of Slave Trade Act 1807 (47 Geo. 3 Sess. 1. c. 36)) and Fifty first (Note: Slave Trade Felony Act 1811 (51 Geo. 3. c. 23)) Years of His Majesty's Reign, respectively, for the Abolition of the Slave Trade. (Repealed by Statute Law Revision Act 1861 (24 & 25 Vict. c. 101))
Duties on Spirits, etc. (Scotland) Act 1818 (repealed)	58 Geo. 3. c. 50	30 May 1818
An Act to amend and continue, until the Tenth Day of November One thousand eight hundred and twenty, an Act passed in the Fifty sixth Year of His present Majesty, (Note: Duties on Spirits, etc. (Scotland) Act 1816 (56 Geo. 3. c. 106)) to repeal the Duties payable in Scotland upon Wash and Spirits, and Distillers' Licences; to grant other Duties in lieu thereof, and to establish further Regulations for the Distillation of Spirits from Corn, for Home Consumption, in Scotland. (Repealed by Statute Law Revision Act 1873 (36 & 37 Vict. c. 91))
Payment of Workmen's Wages Act 1818 (repealed)	58 Geo. 3. c. 51	30 May 1818
An Act to amend certain Acts passed in the Fourth (Note: Cloths Act 1464 (4 Edw. 4. c. 1)) Year of King Edward the Fourth; First (Note: Woollen Manufactures Act 1702 (1 Ann. St. 2. c. 22)) and Tenth (Note: Woollen Manufacture Act 1711 (10 Ann. c. 26)) Years of Queen Anne; First, (Note: Woollen Manufacture Act 1714 (1 Geo. 1. St. 2. c. 15)) Twelfth (Note: Woollen Manufactures Act 1725 (12 Geo. 1. c. 34)) and Thirteenth (Note: Woollen Manufacture Act 1726 (13 Geo. 1. c. 23)) Years of King George the First; Thirteenth, (Note: Frauds of Workmen Act 1739 (13 Geo. 2. c. 8)) Twenty second (Note: Frauds by Workmen Act 1748 (22 Geo. 2. c. 27)) and Twenty ninth (Note: Woollen Manufacture Act 1756 (29 Geo. 2. c. 33)) Years of King George the Second; and Thirteenth (Note: Frauds by Workmen Act 1777 (17 Geo. 3. c. 56)) and Fifty seventh (Note: Payment of Cutters' Wages Act 1817 (57 Geo. 3. c. 115)) (Note: Payment of Colliers' Wages Act 1817 (57 Geo. 3. c. 122)) Years of King George the Third; prohibiting the Payment of the Wages of Workmen in certain Trades otherwise than in the lawful Coin or Money of this Realm. (Repealed by Truck Acts Repeal Act 1831 (1 & 2 Will. 4. c. 36))
Peace Preservation Act 1818 (repealed)	58 Geo. 3. c. 52	30 May 1818
An Act to continue, until the Twentieth Day of June One thousand eight hundred and twenty, an Act of the Fifty second Year of His present Majesty, (Note: Preservation of the Peace Act 1812 (52 Geo. 3. c. 17)) for the more effectual Preservation of the Peace, by enforcing the Duties of Watching and Warding. (Repealed by Statute Law Revision Act 1873 (36 & 37 Vict. c. 91))
Annuities to Duke, etc., of Kent Act 1818 (repealed)	58 Geo. 3. c. 53	30 May 1818
An Act for enabling His Majesty to make further Provision for His Royal Highness the Duke of Kent, and to settle an Annuity on the Princess of Leiningen, in case she shall survive his said Royal Highness. (Repealed by Statute Law Revision Act 1873 (36 & 37 Vict. c. 91))
Assessed Taxes (Ireland) Act 1818 (repealed)	58 Geo. 3. c. 54	1 June 1818
An Act to grant certain Rates, Duties and Taxes in Ireland, in respect of Fire Hearths, Windows, Male Servants, Horses, Carriages and Dogs, in lieu of former Rates, Duties and Taxes thereon; and to provide for the Payment thereof to the Collectors of Excise; and for the more effectual accounting for the same. (Repealed by Duties on Fire Hearths, etc. (Ireland) Act 1822 (3 Geo. 4. c. 54) and Duties on Servants, etc. (Ireland) Act 1823 (4 Geo. 4. c. 9))
Duties on Madder (No. 2) Act 1818 (repealed)	58 Geo. 3. c. 55	1 June 1818
An Act to continue, until the Fifth Day of July One thousand eight hundred and nineteen, Two Acts of the Fifty fourth Year of His present Majesty, for repealing the Duties of Customs on Madder, imported into Great Britain, and for granting other Duties in lieu thereof. (Repealed by Statute Law Revision Act 1873 (36 & 37 Vict. c. 91))
Exportation (No. 2) Act 1818 (repealed)	58 Geo. 3. c. 56	1 June 1818
An Act to make perpetual an Act of the Forty sixth Year of His present Majesty, (Note: Bounty on Silk Manufactures Act 1806 (46 Geo. 3. c. 110)) for granting an additional Bounty on the Exportation of the Silk Manufactures of Great Britain. (Repealed by Statute Law Revision Act 1861 (24 & 25 Vict. c. 101))
Licensed Grocers (Ireland) Act 1818 (repealed)	58 Geo. 3. c. 57	1 June 1818
An Act to amend an Act of the Fifty-fifth Year of His present Majesty, (Note: Intoxicating Liquors (Ireland) Act 1815 (55 Geo. 3. c. 19)) for granting Duties of Excise in Ireland upon certain Licences, and for securing the Payment of such Duties and the regulating the issuing of such Licences. (Repealed by Customs and Excise Act 1952 (15 & 16 Geo. 6 & 1 Eliz. 2. c. 44))
Militia Pay (Great Britain) Act 1818 (repealed)	58 Geo. 3. c. 58	1 June 1818
An Act to defray the Charge of the Pay, Clothing and Contingent Expences of the Disembodied Militia in Great Britain; and for granting Allowances in certain cases to Subaltern Officers, Adjutants, Quartermasters, Surgeons, Surgeons' Mates and Serjeant Majora of Militia, until the Twenty fifth Day of March One thousand eight hundred and nineteen. (Repealed by Statute Law Revision Act 1873 (36 & 37 Vict. c. 91))
Militia Pay (Ireland) Act 1818 (repealed)	58 Geo. 3. c. 59	1 June 1818
An Act for defraying, until the Twenty fifth Day of June One thousand eight hundred and nineteen, the Charge of the Pay and Clothing of the Militia of Ireland; and for making Allowances in certain cases to Subaltern Officers of the said Militia during Peace. (Repealed by Statute Law Revision Act 1873 (36 & 37 Vict. c. 91))
Restriction on Cash Payments (No. 2) Act 1818 (repealed)	58 Geo. 3. c. 60	1 June 1818
An Act to continue, until Three Months after the ceasing of any Restriction imposed on the Bank of England from issuing Cash in Payment, the several Acts for confirming and continuing the Restrictions on Payments in Cash by the Bank of Ireland. (Repealed by Statute Law Revision Act 1873 (36 & 37 Vict. c. 91))
Howth Harbour Act 1818	58 Geo. 3. c. 61	1 June 1818
An Act for the better Accommodation of His Majesty's Packets within the Harbour on the North Side of the Hill of Howth, and for the better Regulation of the Shipping therein.
Bringing of Coals to London, etc. Act 1818 (repealed)	58 Geo. 3. c. 62	1 June 1818
An Act to continue, until the First Day of August One thousand eight hundred and nineteen, Two Acts of His present Majesty, allowing the bringing of Coals, Culm and Cinders to London and Westminster. (Repealed by Statute Law Revision Act 1873 (36 & 37 Vict. c. 91))
Importation (No. 2) Act 1818 (repealed)	58 Geo. 3. c. 63	3 June 1818
An Act to revive and continue, until the Twenty fifth Day of March One thousand eight hundred and nineteen, an Act made in the Forty ninth Year of His present Majesty, (Note: Importation (No. 4) Act 1809 (49 Geo. 3. c. 25)) to permit the Importation of Tobacco from any Place whatever. (Repealed by Statute Law Revision Act 1873 (36 & 37 Vict. c. 91))
Naval Prize Money, etc. Act 1818 (repealed)	58 Geo. 3. c. 64	3 June 1818
An Act to make further Regulations respecting the Payment of Navy Prize Money, and to authorize the Governors of Greenwich Hospital to pay over certain Shares of Prize Money due to Russian Seamen to His Excellency the Russian Ambassador. (Repealed by Naval Prize Acts Repeal Act 1864 (27 & 28 Vict. c. 23))
Duties on Vinegar Act 1818 (repealed)	58 Geo. 3. c. 65	3 June 1818
An Act for repealing the Duties of Excise on Verjuice and Vinegar, and granting other Duties in lieu thereof; and for more effectually securing the Duties of Excise on Vinegar or Acetous Acid. (Repealed by Statute Law Revision Act 1861 (24 & 25 Vict. c. 101))
National Debt Commissioners Act 1818	58 Geo. 3. c. 66	3 June 1818
An Act to empower any Three or more of the Commissioners for the Reduction of the National Debt to exercise all the Powers and Authorities given to the said Commissioners by any Act or Acts of Parliament.
Grand Jury Presentments (Ireland) (No. 2) Act 1818 (repealed)	58 Geo. 3. c. 67	3 June 1818
An Act to provide for the more deliberate Investigation of Presentments to be made by Grand Juries for Roads and Public Works in Ireland, and for accounting for Money raised by such Presentments. (Repealed by Kinsale Act 1819 (59 Geo. 3. c. 84))
Larceny (Ireland) Act 1818 (repealed)	58 Geo. 3. c. 68	3 June 1818
An Act to repeal so much of an Act passed in Ireland in the Ninth Year of the Reign of Queen Anne, intituled "An Act for taking away the Benefit of Clergy in certain cases; and for taking away the Book in all cases; and for repealing Part of the Statute for transporting Felons;" (Note: Criminal Evidence Act 1710 (9 Anne c. 6 (I))) as takes away the Benefit of Clergy from Persons dealing privily from the Person of another; and more effectually to prevent the Crime of Larceny from the Person. (Repealed by Criminal Statutes (Ireland) Repeal Act 1828 (9 Geo. 4. c. 53))
Vestries Act 1818 (repealed)	58 Geo. 3. c. 69	3 June 1818
An Act for the regulation of Parish Vestries. (Repealed by Church of England (Miscellaneous Provisions) Measure 1992 (No. 1))
Disorderly Houses Act 1818 (repealed)	58 Geo. 3. c. 70	3 June 1818
An Act for repealing such Parts of several Acts as allow pecuniary and other Rewards on the Conviction of Persons for Highway Robbery, and other Crimes and Offences; and for facilitating the Means of prosecuting Persons accused of Felony and other Offences. (Repealed by Administration of Justice Act 1965 (c. 2))
Lotteries Act 1818 (repealed)	58 Geo. 3. c. 71	3 June 1818
An Act for granting to His Majesty a Sum of Money to be raised by Lotteries. (Repealed by Statute Law Revision Act 1873 (36 & 37 Vict. c. 91))
Dunmore Harbour Act 1818	58 Geo. 3. c. 72	3 June 1818
An Act for improving and completing the Harbour of Dunmore, in the County of Waterford, and rendering it a fit Situation for His Majesty's Packets.
Payment of Regimental Debts Act 1818 (repealed)	58 Geo. 3. c. 73	5 June 1818
An Act for regulating the Payment of regimental Debts, and the Distribution of the Effects of Officers and Soldiers dying in Service, and the Receipt of Sums due to Soldiers. (Repealed by Statute Law Revision Act 1873 (36 & 37 Vict. c. 91) and Regulation of the Forces Act 1881 (44 & 45 Vict. c. 57))
Chelsea etc., Hospitals Act 1818 (repealed)	58 Geo. 3. c. 74	5 June 1818
An Act for the further Regulation of Payments of Pensions to Soldiers upon the Establishments of Chelsea and Kilmainham. (Repealed by Chelsea and Kilmainham Hospitals Act 1826 (7 Geo. 4. c. 16))
Preservation of Game Act 1818 (repealed)	58 Geo. 3. c. 75	5 June 1818
An Act for the more effectual Prevention of Offences connected with the unlawful Destruction and Sale of Game. (Repealed for England and Wales by Game Act 1831 (1 & 2 Will. 4. c. 32) and for Scotland by Statute Law Revision Act 1861 (24 & 25 Vict. c. 101))
Smuggling, etc. Act 1818 (repealed)	58 Geo. 3. c. 76	5 June 1818
An Act to subject Foreigners to Arrest and Detention for Smuggling within certain Distances of any of the Dominions of His Majesty; for regulating Rewards to the Seizing Officers, according to the Tonnage of Vessels or Boats seized and condemned; and for the further Prevention of the Importation of Tea without making due Entry thereof with the Officers of Customs and Excise. (Repealed by Customs Law Repeal Act 1825 (6 Geo. 4. c. 105))
Duties on Salt Act 1818 (repealed)	58 Geo. 3. c. 77	5 June 1818
An Act to repeal the Duty upon Rock Salt delivered for feeding or mixing with the Food of Cattle, and imposing another Duty, and making other Provisions in lieu thereof. (Repealed by Statute Law Revision Act 1861 (24 & 25 Vict. c. 101))
Duties on Malt, etc. (Ireland) Act 1818 (repealed)	58 Geo. 3. c. 78	5 June 1818
An Act to make further Provision for the better securing the Collection of the Duties on Malt, and to amend the Laws relating to Brewers in Ireland. (Repealed by Statute Law Revision Act 1873 (36 & 37 Vict. c. 91))
Auction Duties (Ireland) Act 1818 (repealed)	58 Geo. 3. c. 79	5 June 1818
An Act to amend an Act of the Fifty fourth Year of His present Majesty's Reign, (Note: Auction Duties (Ireland) Act 1814 (54 Geo. 3. c. 82)) for granting Duties on Auctions in Ireland. (Repealed by Statute Law Revision Act 1861 (24 & 25 Vict. c. 101))
Transfer of Stocks Act 1818 (repealed)	58 Geo. 3. c. 80	5 June 1818
An Act to amend an Act passed in the Fifty seventh Year of His present Majesty, (Note: Transfer of Stocks Act 1817 (57 Geo. 3. c. 79)) for permitting the Transfer of Capital from certain Public Stocks or Funds in Great Britain to certain Public Stocks or Funds in Ireland. (Repealed by Statute Law Revision Act 1861 (24 & 25 Vict. c. 101))
Infant Executors (Ireland) Act 1818 (repealed)	58 Geo. 3. c. 81	5 June 1818
An Act for extending to that Part of the United Kingdom called Ireland certain Provisions of the Parliament of Great Britain in relation to Executors under the Age of Twenty one Years, and to Matrimonial Contracts. (Repealed by Administration of Estates Act (Northern Ireland) 1955 (c. 24 (N.I.)))
Frauds in Sale of Grain (Ireland) Act 1818 (repealed)	58 Geo. 3. c. 82	5 June 1818
An Act to prevent Frauds in the Sale of Grain in Ireland. (Repealed by Summary Jurisdiction (Ireland) Act 1850 (13 & 14 Vict. c. 102))
Hiring of Ships by East India Company Act 1818 (repealed)	58 Geo. 3. c. 83	5 June 1818
An Act to amend and reduce into One Act the several Laws relating to the manner in which the East India Company are required to hire Ships. (Repealed by Statute Law Revision Act 1873 (36 & 37 Vict. c. 91))
Confirmation of Marriages in India Act 1818 (repealed)	58 Geo. 3. c. 84	5 June 1818
An Act to remove Doubts as to the Validity of certain Marriages had and solemnized within the British Territories in India. (Repealed by Statute Law Revision Act 1873 (36 & 37 Vict. c. 91))
Slave Trade (No. 3) Act 1818 (repealed)	58 Geo. 3. c. 85	5 June 1818
An Act to carry into Execution a Convention made between His Majesty and the King of Portugal, for the preventing Traffic in Slaves. (Repealed by Statute Law Revision Act 1861 (24 & 25 Vict. c. 101))
Exchequer Bills (No. 2) Act 1818 (repealed)	58 Geo. 3. c. 86	5 June 1818
An Act for raising the Sum of Eleven millions six hundred thousand Pounds by Exchequer Bills, for the Service of the Year One thousand eight hundred and eighteen. (Repealed by Statute Law Revision Act 1873 (36 & 37 Vict. c. 91))
Treasury Bills (Ireland) Act 1818 (repealed)	58 Geo. 3. c. 87	5 June 1818
An Act for railing the Sum of Eight hundred thousand Pounds British Currency, by Treasury Bills, in Ireland, for the Service of the Year One thousand eight hundred and eighteen. (Repealed by Statute Law Revision Act 1873 (36 & 37 Vict. c. 91))
Public Works Loans Act 1818 (repealed)	58 Geo. 3. c. 88	5 June 1818
An Act to amend Two Acts made in the last Session of Parliament, (Note: Public Works Loans Act 1817 (57 Geo. 3. c. 34)) (Note: Public Works Loans (No. 2) Act 1817 (57 Geo. 3. c. 124)) for authorizing the Issue of Exchequer Bills, and the Advance of Money for carrying on Public Works and Fisheries, and Employment of the Poor; and to extend the Powers of the Commissioners appointed for carrying the said Acts into Execution in Ireland. (Repealed by Statute Law Revision Act 1873 (36 & 37 Vict. c. 91))
Attendance of Magistrates on Board Vessels Act 1818 (repealed)	58 Geo. 3. c. 89	5 June 1818
An Act to repeal so much of an Act passed in the Forty third Year of His present Majesty, (Note: Passenger Vessels Act 1803 (43 Geo. 3. c. 56)) as requires the Attendance of Magistrates on board Vessels carrying Passengers from the United Kingdom to His Majesty 's Plantations or to Foreign Parts. (Repealed by Statute Law Revision Act 1861 (24 & 25 Vict. c. 101))
Care of the King During his Illness, etc. Act 1818 (repealed)	58 Geo. 3. c. 90	5 June 1818
An Act to alter and amend certain of the Provisions of an Act passed in the Fifty first Year of His Majesty's Reign, intituled "An Act to provide for the Administration of the Royal Authority, and for the Care of His Majesty's Royal Person, during the Continuance of His Majesty's Illness; and for the Resumption of the Exercise of the Royal Authority by His Majesty." (Note: Care of King During his Illness, etc. Act 1811 (51 Geo. 3. c. 1)) (Repealed by Statute Law Revision Act 1873 (36 & 37 Vict. c. 91))
Inquiry Concerning Charities (England) Act 1818 (repealed)	58 Geo. 3. c. 91	10 June 1818
An Act for appointing Commissioners to inquire concerning Charities in England for the Education of the Poor. (Repealed by Statute Law Revision Act 1873 (36 & 37 Vict. c. 91))
Army Act 1818 (repealed)	58 Geo. 3. c. 92	10 June 1818
An Act to consolidate and amend the Provisions of several Acts, passed in the Fifty first (Note: Army Act 1811 (51 Geo. 3. c. 106)) and Fifty second (Note: Army Act 1812 (52 Geo. 3. c. 27)) (Note: Army Act (No. 2) 1812 (52 Geo. 3. c. 120)) Years respectively of the Reign of His present Majesty, for enabling Wives and Families of Soldiers to return to their Homes. (Repealed by Army Act 1832 (2 & 3 Will. 4. c. 97))
Relief to Holders of Certain Securities Act 1818 (repealed)	58 Geo. 3. c. 93	10 June 1818
An Act to afford Relief to the bonâ fide Holders of Negotiable Securities, without Notice that they were given for a usurious Consideration. (Repealed by Statute Law Revision Act 1861 (24 & 25 Vict. c. 101))
Sea Fisheries (Ireland) Act 1818 (repealed)	58 Geo. 3. c. 94	10 June 1818
An Act to continue, until the Twenty ninth Day of September One thousand eight hundred and nineteen, and to amend an Act passed in Ireland, in the Thirty sixth Year of His present Majesty, (Note: Sea Fisheries Act 1796 (36 Geo. 3. c. 3 (I))) for the Improvement and Extension of the Fisheries on the Coasts of Ireland. (Repealed by Statute Law Revision Act 1861 (24 & 25 Vict. c. 101))
Election of Coroners (England) Act 1818 (repealed)	58 Geo. 3. c. 95	10 June 1818
An Act to regulate the Election of Coroners for Counties. (Repealed by Coroners Act 1844 (7 & 8 Vict. c. 92))
Aliens Act 1818 (repealed)	58 Geo. 3. c. 96	10 June 1818
An Act to continue, for the Term of Two Years, and until the End of the Session of Parliament in which that Term shall expire, if Parliament shall be then sitting, an Act of the Fifty sixth Year of His present Majesty, (Note: Aliens Act 1816 (56 Geo. 3. c. 86)) for establishing Regulations respecting Aliens arriving in or resident in this Kingdom, in certain cases. (Repealed by Statute Law Revision Act 1873 (36 & 37 Vict. c. 91))
Aliens (No. 2) Act 1818 (repealed)	58 Geo. 3. c. 97	10 June 1818
An Act to prevent Aliens, until the Twenty fifth Day of March One thousand eight hundred and nineteen, from becoming naturalized, or being made or becoming Denizens, except in certain cases. (Repealed by Statute Law Revision Act 1873 (36 & 37 Vict. c. 91))
Slave Trade (No. 4) Act 1818 (repealed)	58 Geo. 3. c. 98	10 June 1818
An Act to explain and amend an Act passed in the Fifty first Year of His Majesty's Reign, for rendering more effectual an Act made in the Forty seventh Year of His Majesty's Reign, (Note: Abolition of Slave Trade Act 1807 (47 Geo. 3 Sess. 1. c. 36)) for the Abolition of the Slave Trade. (Repealed by Statute Law Revision Act 1861 (24 & 25 Vict. c. 101))
Brecknock Forest Act 1818 (repealed)	58 Geo. 3. c. 99	10 June 1818
An Act for altering and amending an Act made in the Fifty fifth Year of His present Majesty, (Note: Brecknock Forest Act 1815 (55 Geo. 3. c. 190)) to amend an Act made in the Forty eighth Year of His present Majesty, (Note: Duchy of Lancaster Act 1808 (48 Geo. 3. c. 73)) to improve the Land Revenue of the Crown, so far as relates to the Great Forest of Brecknock, in the County of Brecknock; and for vesting in His Majesty certain Parts of the said Forest; and for inclosing the said Forest. (Repealed by Wild Creatures and Forest Laws Act 1971 (c. 47))
Sherwood Forest Act 1818 (repealed)	58 Geo. 3. c. 100	10 June 1818
An Act for vesting in His Majesty certain parts of the Hayes of Birkland and Bilhagh, and of certain commonable lands and open uninclosed lands in the township of Edwinstowe, within the forest of Sherwood, in the county of Nottingham. (Repealed by Wild Creatures and Forest Laws Act 1971 (c. 47))
Appropriation Act 1818 (repealed)	58 Geo. 3. c. 101	10 June 1818
An act for applying certain Monies therein mentioned for the Service of the Year One thousand eight hundred and eighteen. (Repealed by Statute Law Revision Act 1873 (36 & 37 Vict. c. 91))

=== Local acts ===
Short title	Citation	Royal assent
Long title
Stroud and Gloucester Road Act 1818 (repealed)	58 Geo. 3. c. i	17 March 1818
An Act for making and maintaining a Road from the Town of Stroud, in the County of Gloucester, through Pitchcomb, into the City of Gloucester. (Repealed by Stroud and Gloucester Turnpike Road Act 1851 (14 & 15 Vict. c. l))
York and Boroughbridge Road Act 1818	58 Geo. 3. c. ii	17 March 1818
An Act to continue the Terms, and alter and enlarge the Powers of Three Acts passed in the Twenty third Year of the Reign of His late Majesty King George the Second, (Note: York and Boroughbridge Road Act 1749 (23 Geo. 2. c. 38)) and in the Eleventh (Note: York and Boroughbridge Road Act 1771 (11 Geo. 3. c. 66)) and Thirty seventh Years (Note: York and Boroughbridge Road Act 1797 (37 Geo. 3. c. 149)) of His present Majesty's Reign, for repairing the Road from the City of York to Boroughbridge in the County of York.
Ayrshire Roads Act 1818 (repealed)	58 Geo. 3. c. iii	17 March 1818
An Act for extending the Powers of an Act passed in the Forty fifth Year of the Reign of His present Majesty, (Note: Ayr (County) Turnpike Roads Act 1805 (45 Geo. 3. c. xxviii)) for repairing Roads in the County of Ayr. (Repealed by Ayr (County) Turnpike Roads Act 1827 (7 & 8 Geo. 4. c. cix))
Bury and Ratcliffe Bridge District of Road Act 1818 (repealed)	58 Geo. 3. c. iv	17 March 1818
An Act for continuing the Term and altering and enlarging the Powers of an Act of His present Majesty's Reign, (Note: Lancashire Roads Act 1798 (38 Geo. 3. c. xi)) for improving the Road from Manchester to Rochdale, and other Roads therein mentioned, in the County of Lancaster; so far as relates to the Bury and Ratcliffe Bridge District of Road therein mentioned; and for making Two new Branches of Road to communicate with the said District of Road. (Repealed by Prestwich, Bury and Radcliffe Roads Act 1829 (10 Geo. 4. c. xxx))
Roads from Gloucester to Cheltenham Act 1818	58 Geo. 3. c. v	17 March 1818
An Act for enlarging the Term and Powers of Two Acts of His present Majesty, (Note: Gloucester Roads Act 1778 (18 Geo. 3. c. 102)) (Note: Gloucester, Cheltenham and Tewkesbury Roads Act 1798 (38 Geo. 3. c. xii)) for repairing the Roads leading from the City of Gloucester towards Cheltenham and Tewkesbury in the County of Gloucester. (Repealed by Statute Law (Repeals) Act 2013 (c. 2))
Manchester and Hyde Turnpike Road Act 1818 (repealed)	58 Geo. 3. c. vi	17 March 1818
An Act for making and maintaining a Turnpike Road from near the Town of Manchester in the County of Lancaster to Hyde Lane Bridge in the County of Chester. (Repealed by Manchester and Hyde Lane Bridge Road Act 1827 (7 & 8 Geo. 4. c. lxviii))
Roads near Hockerton (Nottinghamshire) Act 1818	58 Geo. 3. c. vii	17 March 1818
An Act for continuing and amending an Act of His present Majesty (Note: Notts Roads Act 1774 (14 Geo. 3. c. 101)) for repairing the Roads near the Towns of Hockerton, Kirklington, Southwell, Normanton and Winkbourne, with a Branch from Kirklington to the Street Gate Road, and the Newark and Southwell Turnpike Road at Greet Bridge, in the County of Nottingham.
Henfield and Ditchling Road Act 1818 (repealed)	58 Geo. 3. c. viii	17 March 1818
An Act for enlarging the Term and Powers of several Acts of His present Majesty, for repairing the Road from Crouch Hill, in the Parish of Henfield, to the Turnpike Road leading from Brighthelmstone (Note: Brighthelmstone is now known as Brighton.) to Cuckfield, and from the East Side of the said Turnpike Road to the Cross Roads in the Town of Ditchling, in the County of Sussex. (Repealed by Roads from Henfield Act 1834 (4 & 5 Will. 4. c. x))
Manchester and Salter's Brook Road Act 1818 (repealed)	58 Geo. 3. c. ix	17 March 1818
An Act for continuing the Term and altering and enlarging the Powers of an Act passed in the Thirty third Year of His present Majesty's Reign, (Note: Manchester to Chester Roads Act 1793 (33 Geo. 3. c. 139)) for repairing the Road from Manchester, in the County Palatine of Lancaster, to Salterns Brooke in the County Palatine of Chester. (Repealed by Manchester and Salters Brook Roads Act 1826 (7 Geo. 4. c. xvi))
Turnpike Roads in Peebles Act 1818 (repealed)	58 Geo. 3. c. x	17 March 1818
An Act for making more effectual Provision for Payment of the Debt due by the Trustees for Turnpike Roads, in the County of Peebles, and for other Purposes connected therewith. (Repealed by Turnpike Roads in Peebles Act 1830 (11 Geo. 4 & 1 Will. 4. c. cviii))
Road from Newcastle-upon-Tyne to the Alemouth Turnpike Road Act 1818 (repealed)	58 Geo. 3. c. xi	17 March 1818
An Act for continuing and amending an Act of His present Majesty, (Note: West Cowgate and Alemouth Road Act 1797 (37 Geo. 3. c. 163)) for repairing the Road from West Cowgate, near Newcastle upon Tyne, to the Alemonth Turnpike Road, in the County of Northumberland. (Repealed by Newcastle-upon-Tyne and Alemouth Road Act 1830 (11 Geo. 4 & 1 Will. 4. c. xxi))
Manchester and Wilmslow Road Act 1818 (repealed)	58 Geo. 3. c. xii	17 March 1818
An Act for more effectually repairing and improving the Road from Ardwick Green, near Manchester, in the County Palatine of Lancaster, to the Bridge at the Corn Mills at Wilmslow, in the County Palatine of Chester. (Repealed by Manchester and Wilmslow Road Act 1830 (11 Geo. 4 & 1 Will. 4. c. xxiii))
Towcester and Cotton End Road Act 1818 (repealed)	58 Geo. 3. c. xiii	17 March 1818
An Act to amend an Act of the last Session of Parliament, (Note: Towcester and Cotton End Road Act 1817 (57 Geo. 3. c. xi)) for enlarging the Term and Powers of an Act of His present Majesty, (Note: Towcester to Hardington Road Act 1795 (35 Geo. 3. c. 153)) for repairing the Road leading from Towcester to the Turnpike Road in Cotton End, in the Parish of Hardington, in the County of Northampton. (Repealed by Towcester and Cotton End Road Act 1838 (1 & 2 Vict. c. xlv))
Hagley and Birmingham Road Act 1818 (repealed)	58 Geo. 3. c. xiv	17 March 1818
An Act for repairing the Road from Blakedown Pool, in the Parish of Hagley and County of Worcester, to Birmingham in the County of Warwick. (Repealed by Blakedown Pool and Birmingham Road Act 1841 (4 & 5 Vict. c. ci))
Whitehaven Harbour and Improvement Act 1818	58 Geo. 3. c. xv	17 March 1818
An Act for amending an Act passed in the Fifty sixth Year of the Reign of His present Majesty, intituled "An Act for altering and enlarging the Powers of several Acts passed for improving the Port, Harbour and Town of Whitehaven, in the County of Cumberland, and for better supplying the said Town with Water." (Note: Whitehaven Improvement Act 1816 (56 Geo. 3. c. xliv))
Grand Junction Canal Act 1818	58 Geo. 3. c. xvi	17 March 1818
An Act to enable the Grand Junction Canal Company to vary the Line of Part of their Canal in the County of Hertford, and For altering and enlarging the Powers of several Acts relating to the said Canal.
Gloucester and Berkeley Canal Act 1818	58 Geo. 3. c. xvii	17 March 1818
An Act to enable the Gloucester and Berkeley Canal Company to vary and alter the Line of their Canal; and for altering and enlarging the Powers of several Acts passed for making and maintaining the said Canal.
Thames and Medway Canal Act 1818	58 Geo. 3. c. xviii	17 March 1818
An Act for enabling the Company of Proprietors of Thames and Medway Canal to raise a further Sum of Money for completing the said Canal, and the Works thereto belonging; and for altering, enlarging and rendering more effectual the Powers for making the said Canal and Works.
Birmingham Canal Navigations Act 1818 (repealed)	58 Geo. 3. c. xix	17 March 1818
An Act for altering, explaining and amending the several Acts of Parliament passed, relating to the Birmingham Canal Navigations; and for improving the said Canal Navigations (Repealed by Birmingham Canal Navigations Act 1835 (5 & 6 Will. 4. c. xxxiv))
Leicester County Offices and Judges' Accommodations Act 1818 (repealed)	58 Geo. 3. c. xx	17 March 1818
An Act for providing a convenient House, with suitable Accommodations, for His Majesty's Judges at the Assizes for the County of Leicester; and for making therein a convenient Place for the Justices of the Peace to meet and transact any Public Business of the said County; and also for the safe Custody of the Public Records of the said County. (Repealed by Leicestershire Act 1985 (c. xvii))
Folkestone Harbour Act 1818	58 Geo. 3. c. xxi	19 March 1818
An Act for altering and amending an Act passed in the Forty seventh Year of His present Majesty, (Note: Folkestone Pier and Harbour Act 1807 (47 Geo. 3 Sess. 2. c. ii)) for constructing a Pier and Harbour at or near the Town of Folkestone, in the County of Kent; for varying the Limits, and improving and rendering more commodious the said Pier and Harbour; for raising a further Sum of Money for completing the same; and for extending the Powers and Provisions of the said Act.
Chipping Barnet Churchyard Act 1818	58 Geo. 3. c. xxii	19 March 1818
An Act for enlarging the Church Yard of the Parish of Chipping Barnet, in the County of Hertford, and for other Purposes relating thereto.
Cirencester and Stroud, and Cirencester and Bisley Roads Act 1818 (repealed)	58 Geo. 3. c. xxiii	19 March 1818
An Act to continue the Term, and to amend and enlarge the Powers of several Acts passed for repairing the Road from Cirencester to Stroud and another Road therein mentioned, both in the County of Gloucester. (Repealed by Cirencester Roads Act 1825 (6 Geo. 4. c. cxliii))
Wem and Bron-y-Garth Roads Act 1818 (repealed)	58 Geo. 3. c. xxiv	19 March 1818
An Act for continuing the Term and enlarging the Powers of Two Acts of the Eleventh (Note: Salop and Denbigh Roads Act 1771 (11 Geo. 3. c. 95)) and Thirty seventh (Note: Wem and Bron-y-Garth Road Act 1797 (37 Geo. 3. c. 151)) Years of His present Majesty, for repairing the Road leading from Wem in the County of Salop, to the Lime Rocks at Bron y Garth, and several other Roads in the Counties of Salop and Denbigh; for repairing and diverting the Roads leading out of the said Road from Wem to Bron y Garth into the Turnpike Road leading from Ellesmere to Wrexham; and for repealing so much of the said Acts as relates to a certain Part of the said Roads. (Repealed by Wem and Bronygarth Roads Act 1856 (19 & 20 Vict. c. ciii))
Fraserburgh Harbour Act 1818 (repealed)	58 Geo. 3. c. xxv	8 May 1818
An Act for repairing and maintaining the Harbour of the Burgh of Regality of Fraserburgh, in the County of Aberdeen. (Repealed by Fraserburgh Harbour Act 1839 (2 & 3 Vict. c. lxv))
Road from Dover to Sandwich Act 1818 (repealed)	58 Geo. 3. c. xxvi	8 May 1818
An Act to continue the Term and alter and enlarge the Powers of an Act of the Thirty seventh Year of His present Majesty, (Note: Dover Deal and Sandwich Road Act 1797 (37 Geo. 3. c. 156)) for repairing the Road from Dover, in the County of Kent, through Deal, to Sandwich, in the said County. (Repealed by Dover, Deal and Sandwich Road Act 1839 (2 & 3 Vict. c. xxxiii))
Glasgow and Renfrew Bridge Road Act 1818 (repealed)	58 Geo. 3. c. xxvii	8 May 1818
An Act for altering and enlarging the Terms and Powers of certain Acts, in so far as the same relate to the Road leading from the Toll House in Paisley Lane, at the West Side of the Entry to the New Bridge of Glasgow, by or near Parkhouse, to the East End of the Bridge at Renfrew. (Repealed by Glasgow and Renfrew Road Act 1839 (2 & 3 Vict. c. l))
Waterloo Bridge and Approaches and Surrey New Roads Act 1818 (repealed)	58 Geo. 3. c. xxviii	8 May 1818
An Act to extend and amend the Powers of Three Acts of His present Majesty's Reign, (Note: Strand Bridge Act 1809 (49 Geo. 3. c. cxci)) (Note: Strand Bridge Act 1813 (53 Geo. 3. c. clxxxiv)) (Note: Waterloo Bridge and Approaches Act 1816 (56 Geo. 3. c. lxiii)) for building The Waterloo Bridge, and making Roads communicating therewith; and to authorize the Relinquishment of the repairing, lighting and watching of the Roads on the South Side of the Bridge, to the Trustees of the Surrey New Roads, acting under Two several Acts of His present Majesty's Reign, for making, widening and keeping in Repair certain Roads in the several Parishes of Lambeth, Newington, Saint George Southward, Bermondsey, and Christchurch, in the County of Surrey, and for watching and lighting the said Roads. (Repealed by Local Law (Greater London Council and Inner London Boroughs) Order 1965 (SI 1965/540))
Wearmouth Bridge and Tyne Bridge Road Act 1818 (repealed)	58 Geo. 3. c. xxix	8 May 1818
An Act for continuing and amending an Act of His present Majesty, (Note: Wearmouth and Tyne Bridge Road Act 1796 (36 Geo. 3. c. 136)) for maintaining a Road from Wearmouth Bridge to Tyne Bridge, with a Branch to South Shields, all in the County of Durham. (Repealed by Wearmouth Bridge and Tyne Bridge Road Act 1839 (2 & 3 Vict. c. xxii))
Tewkesbury Roads Act 1818 (repealed)	58 Geo. 3. c. xxx	8 May 1818
An Act for repairing the Roads into and from the Town of Tewkesbury, in the County of Gloucester. (Repealed by Tewkesbury Roads Act 1826 (7 Geo. 4. c. lxxviii))
Roads from Winterslow and from New Sarum Act 1818 (repealed)	58 Geo. 3. c. xxxi	8 May 1818
An Act for enlarging the Term and Powers of Three Acts, (Note: Wiltshire and Southampton Roads Act 1753 (26 Geo. 2. c. 66)) (Note: Wiltshire Roads Act 1772 (12 Geo. 3. c. 74)) (Note: Wiltshire and Hampshire Roads Act 1798 (38 Geo. 3. c. xxxviii)) for repairing the Roads from Lobcome Corner in the Parish of Winterslow, to Harnham Bridge in the County of Wilts, and from the Weft Corner of Saint Anne's Street in the City of New Sarum to Landford, and other Roads in the County of Southampton. (Repealed by Winterslow and New Sarum Roads Act 1840 (3 & 4 Vict. c. xxxiv))
Rugby and Warwick Road Act 1818 (repealed)	58 Geo. 3. c. xxxii	8 May 1818
An Act for repairing and widening the Road from the Town of Rugby, in the County of Warwick, to the Borough of Warwick, in the same County. (Repealed by Rugby and Warwick Road Act 1839 (2 & 3 Vict. c. xxiii))
Halifax and Huddersfield Road Act 1818	58 Geo. 3. c. xxxiii	8 May 1818
An Act for enlarging the Term and Powers of Two Acts of His present Majesty, (Note: Halifax to Sheffield Road Act 1777 (17 Geo. 3. c. 106)) (Note: Halifax to Sheffield Road Act 1793 (33 Geo. 3. c. 142)) for repairing the Road from Halifax to Sheffield, in the West Riding of the County of York, so far as relates to the First District of the said Road, from Halifax to Huddersfield.
Old Stratford (Warwickshire) and Long Compton Hill Road Act 1818 (repealed)	58 Geo. 3. c. xxxiv	8 May 1818
An Act for repairing the Road from Bridgetown in the Parish of Old Stratford, in the County of Warwick, to the Top of Long Compton Hill in the same County, and another Road therein mentioned, in the Counties of Warwick, Worcester and Gloucester. (Repealed by Warwick, Worcester, Gloucester and Oxford Roads Act 1825 (6 Geo. 4. c. clv))
Sheffield and Glossop Road Act 1818 (repealed)	58 Geo. 3. c. xxxv	8 May 1818
An Act for making and maintaining a Road from the Town of Sheffield, in the County of York, to join the Marple Bridge Road in the Parish of Glossop, in the County of Derby, with a Branch to Mortimer's Road, in the Parish of Hathersage, in the said County of Derby. (Repealed by Sheffield and Glossop Road Act 1825 (6 Geo. 4. c. xcviii))
Burton-upon-Trent and Derby Road Act 1818	58 Geo. 3. c. xxxvi	8 May 1818
An Act for more effectually repairing and improving the Road from the West End of the Town of Burton upon Trent, in the County of Stafford, through the said Town, to the South End of the Town of Derby, in the County of Derby.
Brampton Brierley, Mexborough and Hooton Roberts Turnpike Road Act 1818 (repealed)	58 Geo. 3. c. xxxvii	8 May 1818
An Act for making and maintaining a Turnpike Road from the South End of Angel Lane, in Brampton Bierley, to a certain Public Highway in Mexbrough; and also from Clegg's Cottage, in Rawmarth, to the North End of Kilnhurst Bridge; and from the South End of the said Bridge to the West End of the Village of Hooton Roberts, in the West Riding of the County of York. (Repealed by Brampton Brierley to Mexborough and Rawmarsh to Hooton Roberts Roads (Yorks.) Act 1838 (1 & 2 Vict. c. xliv))
Little Smeaton and Darrington Road Act 1818	58 Geo. 3. c. xxxviii	8 May 1818
An Act for diverting such Part of the Public Carriage Road leading from Little Smeaton to Darrington, in the County of York, as is within the Township of Stapleton; and for shutting up and discontinuing a certain Footpath in the said Township.
Road from Farnhurst to Chichester and to Delkey Act 1818	58 Geo. 3. c. xxxix	8 May 1818
An Act for continuing and amending an Act of His present Majesty (Note: Farnhurst Chichester and Delkey Road Act 1797 (37 Geo. 3. c. 148)) for repairing the Road from the North End of Farnhurst Lane to the City of Chichesetr, and from Chichesetr aforesaid to Delkey, in the County of Sussex.
Roads from Stoke Goldington to Northampton Act 1818 (repealed)	58 Geo. 3. c. xl	8 May 1818
An Act for enlarging the Term and Powers of an Act of His present Majesty, (Note: Newport Pagnell Roads Act 1797 (37 Geo. 3. c. 177)) for repairing the Roads between the Horse Shoe House in Stoke Goldington, in the County of Buckingham, and the Town of Northampton, and from the North Bridge of Newport Pagnel, in the said County of Buckingham, to the said Horse Shoe House. (Repealed by Road from Northampton to Newport Pagnell Act 1839 (2 & 3 Vict. c. xiii))
Road from Lockwood to Meltham Act 1818 (repealed)	58 Geo. 3. c. xli	8 May 1818
An Act for making and maintaining a Road from Lockwood to Meltham, and a Branch of Road to Meltham Mills, all in the Parish of Almondbury, in the West Riding of the County of York. (Repealed by Road from Lockwood to Meltham Act 1825 (6 Geo. 4. c. lxxxvi))
Warrington and Lower Irlam Road Act 1818	58 Geo. 3. c. xlii	8 May 1818
An Act for more effectually repairing and improving the Road between Warrington and Lower Irlam, in the County Palatine of Lancaster.
Roads from Studley Bridge and from Chippenham Act 1818	58 Geo. 3. c. xliii	8 May 1818
An Act for more effectually repairing and improving the Road leading from Studley Bridge, through the Borough of Chippenham, to Pickwick, and from the East End of Chippenham Bridge to Lower Stanton, and from the East End of the said Bridge to join the Road at Draycot Cerne, in the County of Wilts.
Poole Roads Act 1818 (repealed)	58 Geo. 3. c. xliv	8 May 1818
An Act for continuing and amending Two Acts of His present Majesty, (Note: Poole Roads Act 1777 (17 Geo. 3. c. 104)) (Note: Poole Roads Act 1799 (39 Geo. 3. c. lxv)) for repairing several Roads leading from the Town of Poole; and also for repairing other Roads in and near the said Town, and from Cranborne to Coombe, with Two Branches to the Great Western Road, in the Counties of Dorset and Wilts. (Repealed by Poole Roads Act 1836 (6 & 7 Will. 4. c. xlvii))
Wincanton Roads Act 1818	58 Geo. 3. c. xlv	8 May 1818
An Act for continuing and amending an Act of His late Majesty, (Note: Wincanton Roads Act 1756 (29 Geo. 2. c. 49)) and Two Acts of His present Majesty, (Note: Wilts and Somerset Roads Act 1777 (17 Geo. 3. c. 93)) (Note: Willoughby Hedge Roads Act 1798 (38 Geo. 3. c. l)) for repairing several Roads leading to and from the Town of Wincanton, and the Roads communicating therewith, in the Counties of Somerset, Wilts and Dorset.
East, West and Wildmore Fens Chapels Act 1818	58 Geo. 3. c. xlvi	8 May 1818
An Act for amending Two Acts of His present Majesty, (Note: Wildmore Fen Inclosure Act 1802 (42 Geo. 3. c. cviii)) (Note: East and West Fens Allotments and Inclosures Act 1810 (50 Geo. 3. c. cxxix)) so far at the same relate to the Establishment of Chapels in the East, West and Wildmore Fens in the County of Lincoln.
Forest of Delamere Inclosure Act 1818	58 Geo. 3. c. xlvii	8 May 1818
An Act to amend Two Acts, passed in the Fifty second (Note: Delamere Forest Inclosure Act 1812 (52 Geo. 3. c. cxxxvi)) and Fifty fourth (Note: Delamere Forest Inclosure Act 1814 (54 Geo. 3. c. xcix)) Years of His present Majesty, for inclosing the Forest of Delamere in the County of Chester.
Eau Brink Act 1818 or the Bedford Level Drainage and Ouse Navigation Act 1818 (repealed)	58 Geo. 3. c. xlviii	8 May 1818
An Act for increasing the Fund for carrying into Execution several Acts of His present Majesty, for improving the Drainage of the Middle and South Levels, Part of the Great Level of the Fens called Bedford Level, and other Lands therein mentioned; and for improving the Navigation of the River Ouse in the County of Norfolk, and of the several Rivers communicating therewith. (Repealed by Ouse Outfall Act 1860 (23 & 24 Vict. c. lxxxviii))
Ramsey Inclosure Act 1818	58 Geo. 3. c. xlix	8 May 1818
An Act for altering and enlarging the Powers of an Act of the Thirty sixth Year of His present Majesty, (Note: Ramsey (Huntingdonshire) Drainage, etc. Act 1796 (36 Geo. 3. c. 72)) for dividing, allotting, inclosing, draining and preserving certain Commons and Waste Grounds within the Manor and Parish of Ramsey, in the County of Huntingdon, and for repealing a certain Act (Note: Isle of Ely Drainage Act 1757 (30 Geo. 2. c. 33)) therein mentioned.
Berkshire and Wiltshire Drainage Act 1818	58 Geo. 3. c. l	8 May 1818
An Act for draining and improving Lands in the Parishes of Bray White, Waltham, Shottesbrook, Lawrence Waltham, Binfield, Ruscomb, Wargrave, Remenham and Hurley, in the County of Berks, and the Liberties of Whistley and Broad Hinton, in the Parish of Hurst, in the Counties of Berks and Wilts.
Exeter Gaol Act 1818 (repealed)	58 Geo. 3. c. li	8 May 1818
An Act for building a new Gaol and House of Correction for the City and County of the City of Exeter. (Repealed by Statute Law (Repeals) Act 2008 (c. 12))
Paisley Bridewell, Gaol, Court House and Public Offices Act 1818	58 Geo. 3. c. lii	8 May 1818
An Act to alter and amend an Act (Note: Paisley and Renfrewshire Bridewell, Gaol, Courthouse and Public Offices Act 1815 (55 Geo. 3. c. lxxiii)) for erecting and maintaining a Bridewell, Gaol, Court House and Public Offices, for the Burgh of Paisley and County of Renfrew.
Southminster Parish Church and Churchyard Act 1818	58 Geo. 3. c. liii	8 May 1818
An Act for enlarging the Parish Church and Church Yard of Southminster in the County of Essex.
Sheffield Improvement Act 1818	58 Geo. 3. c. liv	8 May 1818
An Act for cleansing, lighting, watching, and otherwise improving the Town of Sheffield, in the County of York.
Bath Gas Act 1818 (repealed)	58 Geo. 3. c. lv	8 May 1818
An Act for lighting with Gas the City of Bath and the Liberties and Precincts thereof, and that Part of the Parish of Walcot which lies without the Liberties of Bath, and the Parish of Bathwick, in the County of Somerset; and for constructing Gasometers and other Works therein, and in the Parish of Weston in the said County. (Repealed by Bath Gas Act 1856 (19 & 20 Vict. c. xxix))
Leeds Gas Act 1818 (repealed)	58 Geo. 3. c. lvi	8 May 1818
An Act for lighting with Gas the Town and Neighbourhood of Leeds, in the Borough of Leeds, in the West Riding of the County of York. (Repealed by Leeds Gaslight Company's Act 1853 (16 & 17 Vict. c. xlv))
Nottingham Gas Act 1818 (repealed)	58 Geo. 3. c. lvii	8 May 1818
An Act for lighting with Gas the Town and County of the Town of Nottingham. (Repealed by Nottingham Gas Act 1842 (5 & 6 Vict. c. xiii))
St. Giles, Reading, Parish Church, Burial Ground and Churchyard Act 1818	58 Geo. 3. c. lviii	8 May 1818
An Act for providing an additional Burial Ground for the Parish of Saint Giles, Reading, in the County of Berks, and a Room for the Use of the Minister in performing the Burial Service; and for stopping up one of the Footpaths over the present Church Yard of the said Parish.
Aberdeen Improvement Act 1818 (repealed)	58 Geo. 3. c. lix	23 May 1818
An Act for better paving, cleansing, lighting, watching and improving the Streets, Lanes and other Public Places and Passages of the City of Aberdeen, and the Roads and Avenues within the Freedom and Royalty thereof; and for supplying the Inhabitants of the said City with Water. (Repealed by Aberdeen Improvement Act 1829 (10 Geo. 4. c. xli))
East, West and Wildmore Fens Drainage Act 1818	58 Geo. 3. c. lx	23 May 1818
An Act for rendering more effectual several Acts of His present Majesty for draining certain Low Lands on both Sides of the River Witham, and in Wildmore Fen, and in the West and East Fens, and other Low Lands adjoining or contiguous thereto, in the County of Lincoln.
Port Logan Harbour Act 1818	58 Geo. 3. c. lxi	23 May 1818
An Act for erecting and maintaining a Harbour, and Works connected therewith, in the Bay of Portnessock, at Kirkmaiden, within the Barony of Logan, in the County of Wigton.
Port of London Improvement Act 1818 (repealed)	58 Geo. 3. c. lxii	23 May 1818
An Act to amend the several Acts passed for making Wet Docks, Basons, Cuts and other Works, for the greater Accommodation and Security of Shipping, Commerce and Revenue, within the Port of London. (Repealed by London Docks Act 1828 (9 Geo. 4. c. cxvi))
Kington Railway Act 1818	58 Geo. 3. c. lxiii	23 May 1818
An Act for making a Railway from the Hay Railway near Eardisley, in the County of Hereford, to the Lime Works near Burlinjob, in the County of Radnor.
Oxford Gas Act 1818 (repealed)	58 Geo. 3. c. lxiv	23 May 1818
An Act for lighting with Gas the University and City of Oxford, and the Suburbs of the said City. (Repealed by Oxford Gaslight and Coke Company's Act 1869 (32 & 33 Vict. c. cxxii))
Sheffield Gas Act 1818 (repealed)	58 Geo. 3. c. lxv	23 May 1818
An Act for lighting with Gas the Town and Parish of Sheffield, in the County of York. (Repealed by Sheffield United Gas Light Company Act 1844 (7 & 8 Vict. c. xlv))
Liverpool and Toxteth Park Gas Act 1818 (repealed)	58 Geo. 3. c. lxvi	23 May 1818
An Act for lighting with Gas the Port and Town of Liverpool and Township of Toxteth Park, in the County of Lancaster. (Repealed by Liverpool Gaslight Company Act 1847 (10 & 11 Vict. c. lxvii))
Edinburgh Gas Act 1818 (repealed)	58 Geo. 3. c. lxvii	23 May 1818
An Act for lighting the City and Suburbs of Edinburgh and Places adjacent with Gas. (Repealed by Edinburgh Corporation Order Confirmation Act 1932 (22 & 23 Geo. 5. c. vii))
Southwark Bridge Act 1818	58 Geo. 3. c. lxviii	23 May 1818
An Act for enabling the Southwark Bridge Company to raise a further Sum of Money, and to amend the Acts for building the said Bridge.
Bramley to Ridgewick Turnpike Road Act 1818 (repealed)	58 Geo. 3. c. lxix	23 May 1818
An Act for making and maintaining a Turnpike Road from Bramley in the County of Surrey, to Ridgewick in the County of Sussex. (Repealed by Bramley and Ridgewick Turnpike Road Act 1852 (c.xcii))
Ulverstone, Millthorpe and Carnforth Turnpike Road Act 1818 (repealed)	58 Geo. 3. c. lxx	23 May 1818
An Act for making and maintaining a Turnpike Road from the Turnpike Road leading from Ulverstone to Kendall into the Turnpike Road leading from Millthorpe to Kendal and a Continuation of the said Road from the last mentioned Turnpike Road to join the Turnpike Road leading from Lancaster to Kendal. (Repealed by Ulverstone, Millthorp and Lancaster Turnpike Road Act 1850 (13 & 14 Vict. c. lxv))
Kirkcudbright Roads, Statute Labour, Bridges and Ferries Act 1818	58 Geo. 3. c. lxxi	23 May 1818
An Act for more effectually converting into Money the Statute Labour in the Stewartry of Kirkcudbright; for repairing the Highways, Bridges and Ferries therein; and for making and maintaining certain Turnpike Roads within the said Stewartry.
Road from Chipping Camden to Old Stratford Act 1818 (repealed)	58 Geo. 3. c. lxxii	23 May 1818
An Act for repairing the Road from Chipping Campden, in the County of Gloucester, to Clifford Side Gate in the Parish of Old Stratford, in the County of Warwick. (Repealed by Statute Law (Repeals) Act 2013 (c. 2))
Basingstoke and Lobcomb Corner Roads Act 1818 (repealed)	58 Geo. 3. c. lxxiii	23 May 1818
An Act to continue the Term and enlarge the Powers of several Acts for repairing the Roads from Basingstoke, through Popham Lane, Sutton Scotney and Stockbridge, in the County of Southampton, to a Place called Lobcomb Corner, in the County of Wilts. (Repealed by Basingstoke, Stockbridge and Lobcomb Corner Turnpike Roads Act 1855 (18 & 19 Vict. c. civ))
Writers to the Signet Widows' Fund Act 1818 (repealed)	58 Geo. 3. c. lxxiv	23 May 1818
An Act to alter and amend an Act passed in the Forty third Year of His Majesty's Reign, (Note: Writers to the Signet Widows' Fund Act 1803 (43 Geo. 3. c. cvii)) for raising a Fund for making Provision for the Widows of the Writers to His Majesty's Signet in Scotland. (Repealed by Statute Law (Repeals) Act 1998 (c. 43))
Kidwelly and Llanelly Canal and Tramroad Company Act 1818	58 Geo. 3. c. lxxv	28 May 1818
An Act to explain and amend an Act of the Fifty second Year of His present Majesty, intituled "An Act for the Improvement of the Harbour of Kidwelly, and for making and maintaining a Navigable Canal or Tramroads in Kidwelly and Llanelly, and other Parishes therein mentioned, in the County of Carmarthen;" (Note: Kidwelly and Llanelly Canal and Tramroad Company Act 1812 (52 Geo. 3. c. clxxiii)) and to alter and enlarge the Powers thereof.
Southwark and Highgate (Sussex), and Kennington and Camberwell Roads Act 1818 (repealed)	58 Geo. 3. c. lxxvi	28 May 1818
An Act to continue the Term, and to amend, alter and enlarge the Powers of an Act passed in the Forty second Year of His present Majesty's Reign, (Note: Surrey and Sussex Roads Act 1802 (42 Geo. 3. c. lxxvi)) for repealing an Act of the Twenty fifth Year of His said present Majesty, (Note: Surrey and Sussex Roads Act 1785 (25 Geo. 3. c. 117)) for repairing the Roads from the Stones' End in Blackman Street in the Borough of Southwark, in the County of Surrey, to Highgate in the County of Sussex, and other Roads therein mentioned; and for making a new Road from Kennington Lane to Camberweil Green, in the said County of Surrey. (Repealed by Southwark and Highgate (Sussex) Road Act 1828 (9 Geo. 4. c. cxx))
Crowland Inclosures and Drainage Act 1818	58 Geo. 3. c. lxxvii	30 May 1818
An Act to amend and render more effectual an Act passed in the Forty first Year of His present Majesty, (Note: Crowland Inclosure Act 1801 (41 Geo. 3. (U.K.). c. cxvi)) for draining, dividing and inclosing a Common called Cropland Common, otherwise Goggushland, and certain Open Half Year's Meadow, Commonable and Waste Grounds, called the Washes and Fodder Lots, in, adjoining or near the Township of Crowland, in the County of Lincoln.
Road from Greenwich to Woolwich Act 1818 (repealed)	58 Geo. 3. c. lxxviii	30 May 1818
An Act for repairing, widening and improving the Lower Road leading from the Town of Greenwich to the Town of Woolwich, in the County of Kent. (Repealed by Road from Greenwich to Woolwich Act 1824 (5 Geo. 4. c. lvi))
Roads to and from Monmouth Act 1818 (repealed)	58 Geo. 3. c. lxxix	1 June 1818
An Act to enlarge the Term and Powers of Four Acts of His late and present Majesty, (Note: Monmouth Roads Act 1755 (28 Geo. 2. c. 31)) (Note: Monmouth Roads Act 1777 (17 Geo. 3. c. 96)) (Note: Monmouth Roads Act 1793 (33 Geo. 3. c. 169)) (Note: Monmouth Roads Act 1810 (50 Geo. 3. c. xcvii)) for repairing several Roads leading to, through and from the Town of Monmouth; and for making Two Pieces of Road to communicate therewith. (Repealed by Monmouth Roads Act 1831 (1 & 2 Will. 4. c. xviii))
High Court of Chancery Clerks Act 1818 (repealed)	58 Geo. 3. c. lxxx	3 June 1818
An Act to provide additional Salaries to the present Clerks in the Report Office of the High Court of Chancery, and to provide additional Clerks for the said Office; and for making further Provision for the Clerks in the said Office. (Repealed by Court of Chancery (Funds) Act 1872 (35 & 36 Vict. c. 44))
Monmouth Improvement Act 1818	58 Geo. 3. c. lxxxi	3 June 1818
An Act for paving the Footways, and cleansing, lighting and watching the Streets, in the Town of Monmouth.
Beckhampton Roads Act 1818	58 Geo. 3. c. lxxxii	3 June 1818
An Act to continue the Term and enlarge the Powers of an Act of His present Majesty, (Note: Road from Beckhampton and from Swindon Act 1799 (39 Geo. 3. c. xlix)) for repairing the Road at or near Beckhampton, and other Roads in the said Act mentioned, in the County of Wilts.
Kidderminster Gas Act 1818 (repealed)	58 Geo. 3. c. lxxxiii	5 June 1818
An Act for lighting the Borough of Kidderminster, in the County of Worcester, with Gas. (Repealed by Kidderminster Gas Act 1867 (30 & 31 Vict. c. xiii))
Worcester Gas Act 1818	58 Geo. 3. c. lxxxiv	5 June 1818
An Act for lighting with Gas the City of Worcester, and the Liberties, Precincts and Suburbs thereof; and those Parts of the several Parishes of Saint Peter the Great, Saint Martin, Saint Michael in Bedwardine, Saint John in Bedwardine, Claines and Saint Clement, which lie contiguous to, but without the Liberties of the said City and in the County of Worcester.
Monmouth Water Act 1818	58 Geo. 3. c. lxxxv	5 June 1818
An Act for better supplying the Inhabitants of the Town of Monmouth with Water.
Pendleton Chapel of Ease Act 1818 (repealed)	58 Geo. 3. c. lxxxvi	10 June 1818
An Act for building a Chapel of Ease in the Township of Pendleton, and Parish of Eceles, in the County Palatine of Lancaster. (Repealed by St. Matthew's Chapel, Pendleton Act 1820 (1 Geo. 4. c. lviii))
Brighthelmston Gas Act 1818 (repealed)	58 Geo. 3. c. lxxxvii	10 June 1818
An Act for lighting with Gas the Town of Brighthelmstone, in the County of Sussex. (Repealed by Brighton Gaslight Act 1848 (11 & 12 Vict. c. xl))

=== Private acts ===
Short title	Citation	Royal assent
Long title
Cranford Inclosure Act 1818	58 Geo. 3. c. 1 Pr.	17 March 1818
An Act for inclosing Lands in the Parish of Cranford, in the County of Middlesex.
St. Martin in the Fields Almshouses Act 1818	58 Geo. 3. c. 2 Pr.	8 May 1818
An Act for enabling the Trustees acting under Letters Patent granted by King Charles the Second, to dispose of certain old Almshouses and other Premises, held in Trust for the Parish of Saint Martin in the Fields, in the County of Middlesex; and for vesting Part of the new Burial Ground belonging to the said Parish, at or near Camden Town, in the said Trustees, as a Site for erecting new Almshouses thereon; and for other Purposes.
Laverstock Inclosure Act 1818	58 Geo. 3. c. 3 Pr.	8 May 1818
An Ad for inclosing Lands within the Parish of Laverstock, including the Tithing of Ford, in the County of Wilts.
Damerham South Inclosure Act 1818	58 Geo. 3. c. 4 Pr.	8 May 1818
An Act for inclosing Lands in the Parish of Damerham South, in the County of Wilts.
Warsop Inclosure Act 1818	58 Geo. 3. c. 5 Pr.	8 May 1818
An Act for inclosing Lands in the Parish of Warsop, in the County of Nottingham.
Thelnetham Inclosure Act 1818	58 Geo. 3. c. 6 Pr.	8 May 1818
An Act for inclosing Lands in the Parish of Thelnetham, in the County of Suffolk.
Middop Inclosure Act 1818	58 Geo. 3. c. 7 Pr.	8 May 1818
An Act for inclosing Lands in Middop, otherwise Midhope, in the Parish of Ecclesfield, in the County of York.
Oxspring Inclosure Act 1818	58 Geo. 3. c. 8 Pr.	8 May 1818
An Act for inclosing Lands in Oxspring, in the Parish of Penistone, and County of York.
Ainstable Inclosure Act 1818	58 Geo. 3. c. 9 Pr.	8 May 1818
An Act for inclosing Lands within the Manor of Ainstable, in the Parish of Ainstable, in the County of Cumberland.
Isleworth Inclosure Act Amendment Act 1818	58 Geo. 3. c. 10 Pr.	8 May 1818
An Act to amend an Act made in the Fifty third Year of His present Majesty, (Note: Isleworth, Heston and Twickenham Inclosures Act 1813 (53 Geo. 3. c. clxxiv)) for inclosing Lands in the Parishes of Isleworth, Heston and Twickenham, in the County of Middlesex.
Noke Inclosure Act 1818	58 Geo. 3. c. 11 Pr.	8 May 1818
An Act for allotting Lands in the Parish of Noke, in the County of Oxford.
Erpingham Inclosure Act 1818	58 Geo. 3. c. 12 Pr.	8 May 1818
An Act for inclosing Lands in the Parishes of Erpingham, Colby, Banningbam and Ingwortb, in the County of Norfolk.
Wood Dalling Inclosure Act 1818	58 Geo. 3. c. 13 Pr.	8 May 1818
An Act for inclosing Lands in the Parishes of Itteringham, Oulton, Wickmere and Wood Dalling, in the County of Norfolk.
Great Melton Inclosure Act 1818	58 Geo. 3. c. 14 Pr.	8 May 1818
An Act for inclosing Lands within the Parish of Great Melton, otherwise Melton Saint Mary, and All Saints, in the County of Norfolk.
Moreton Valence Inclosure Act 1818	58 Geo. 3. c. 15 Pr.	8 May 1818
An Act for inclosing Lands in the Parish of Moreton Valence, and in the Hamlet or Tithing of Putloe, in the Parish of Standish, both in the County of Gloucester.
Norbury Inclosure Act 1818	58 Geo. 3. c. 16 Pr.	8 May 1818
An Act for inclosing Lands in the Parish of Norbury, in the County of Derby.
Marden, &c. Inclosure Act Amendment Act 1818	58 Geo. 3. c. 17 Pr.	8 May 1818
An Act to amend and enlarge the Powers of an Act of His present Majesty, (Note: Marden, Sutton St. Michael, Sutton St. Nicholas and Withington Inclosures Act 1808 (48 Geo. 3. c. xcv)) for inclosing Lands in the Parishes of Marden, Sutton Saint Michael, Sutton Saint Nicholas and Withington, and certain Chapelries, Townships and Parishes adjacent thereto, in the County of Hereford.
South Moreton Inclosure Act 1818	58 Geo. 3. c. 18 Pr.	8 May 1818
An Act for inclosing Lands in the Parish of South Moreton, in the County of Berks.
Walsham-le-Willows Inclosure Act 1818	58 Geo. 3. c. 19 Pr.	8 May 1818
An Act for inclosing Lands in the Parish of Walsham-le-Willows, in the County of Suffolk.
Etton Inclosure Act 1818	58 Geo. 3. c. 20 Pr.	8 May 1818
An Act for inclosing Lands in the Township of Etton, in the Parish of Etton, in the East Riding of the County of York.
Penniall's Estate Act 1818	58 Geo. 3. c. 21 Pr.	8 May 1818
An Act to enable Peter Penniall, and others therein mentioned, to grant a Building Lease of certain Premises situate in High Street, in the Parish of Saint Mary Newington, in the County of Surrey.
St. Paul's School's Estate Act 1818	58 Geo. 3. c. 22 Pr.	23 May 1818
An Act to enable the Trustees of Saint Paul's School, in the City of London, to purchase Buildings and Land adjoining or near to the said School, for the better Accommodation of the Scholars, and for other Purposes.
Bradford Grammar School's Estate Act 1818	58 Geo. 3. c. 23 Pr.	23 May 1818
An Act to enable the Governors of the Free Grammar School of King Charles the Second, at Bradford in the County of York, to sell the old School House, and to sell certain Lands belonging to the said Foundation, and to apply the Money arising by such Sales in the Building of a new School House, and in the Purchase of other Estates, to be vested in the Governors on the Trusts of the said Charity, and to convey the Inheritance in Fee Simple, for building, upon reserved Rents, or to make building Leases of certain Parts of the Estates of the said School; and also to enable the Governors to increase the number of Masters, and allow proper Salaries, and for enlarging the Trusts and Powers of the said Governors.
Harvey's Estate Act 1818	58 Geo. 3. c. 24 Pr.	23 May 1818
An Act for effecting an Exchange of an Estate in the County of Norfolk, devised by the Will of Robert Harvey Esquire to John Harvey Esquire, under certain Limitations, for an Estate belonging to the said John Harvey Esquire, in Fee Simple, to be subjected to the like Limitations.
Lakenheath Inclosure Act 1818	58 Geo. 3. c. 25 Pr.	23 May 1818
An Act for dividing and allotting Lands in the Parish of Lakenheath in the County of Suffolk.
Bradford Inclosure Act 1818	58 Geo. 3. c. 26 Pr.	23 May 1818
An Act for inclosing Lands in the Parish of Bradford, in the County of Wilts.
Heworth Inclosure Act 1818	58 Geo. 3. c. 27 Pr.	23 May 1818
An Act for amending an Act of His present Majesty, intituled "An Act for dividing and inclosing Heworth Moor, in the Manor or Township of Heworth, in the North Riding of the County of York; and for extinguishing the Rights of Stray and Average over certain Lands, called Half Year Lands, situate in the Suburbs or Precinctss of the City of York;" (Note: Heworth Inclosure Act 1817 (57 Geo. 3. c. 19 Pr.)) and for extending the Provisions of the said Act, to the Inclosure of certain Lands in the Suburbs or Precincts of the City of York.
Dublin Inclosure Act 1818	58 Geo. 3. c. 28 Pr.	23 May 1818
An Act for inclosing Lands in the Parishes of Kilmainham, Saint James, Clondalkin, Crumlin, Newcastle and Rathcoole, in the County of Dublin.
Hurstborne Tarrant Allotment Act 1818	58 Geo. 3. c. 29 Pr.	23 May 1818
An Act for extinguishing a limited Right of Common over certain Coppices or Woodlands and Grounds in the Parish of Hurstborne Tarrant, in the County of Southampton; and for allotting and setting out a Part of the same, to be subject to a more extensive Right of Common, in lieu of the Right extinguished.
Barnard's Estate Act 1818	58 Geo. 3. c. 30 Pr.	28 May 1818
An Act for empowering Trustees to join, as to one undivided fourth Part of certain Estates devised by the Will of Edward Barnard, Gentleman, deceased, in the Sale of the Entirety of the same Estates, and to purchase other Lands to be settled to the same Uses; and also for enabling the same Trustees to join as to the same undivided fourth Part in making a Partition of the same Estates; and also for empowering certain Trustees to join in granting Leases of the Entirety of the same Premises, and for other Purposes.
Knightley's Estate Act 1818	58 Geo. 3. c. 31 Pr.	28 May 1818
An Act for repealing an Act passed in the Fifty third Year of His present Majesty's Reign, intituled "An Act for vesting Part of the settled Estates of Sir Charles Knightley Baronet, which were devised by the Will of Lucy Knightley Esquire, in Trustees, to be sold, and for laying out the Money arising thereby in the Purchase of other Estates to be settled in lieu thereof, and to the same Uses, and for other Purposes;" (Note: Knightley's Estate Act 1813 (53 Geo. 3. c. clxvi)) and for vesting that Part and other Parts of the said settled Estates in other Trustees to be sold, and for applying Part of the Money arising thereby in the Discharge of certain Incumbrances thereon, and laying out the Residue of the same Money in the Purchase of other Estates, to be settled to the same Uses.
Ingram's Estate Act 1818	58 Geo. 3. c. 32 Pr.	28 May 1818
An Act to render effectual a Conveyance of the legal Fee as to a Moiety of certain Hereditaments in the Parishes of Llanidlues, Llangerrig and Llandinam, in the County of Montgomery, belonging to Robert Ingram Esquire.
Lytchet Matravers, &c. Inclosure Act 1818	58 Geo. 3. c. 33 Pr.	28 May 1818
An Act for inclosing Lands in the Parishes of Lytchet Matravers, and Lytchet Minster, in the County of Dorset.
Goodenough's Estate Act 1818	58 Geo. 3. c. 34 Pr.	3 June 1818
An Act for effecting and establishing an Exchange between the Reverend Robert Philip Goodenough, Rector of Carlton in Lindrick, in the County of Nottingham, and Henry Gaily Knight Esquire, of Glebe and other Lands in Carlton aforesaid.
Marquis of Ormonde's Estate Act 1818	58 Geo. 3. c. 35 Pr.	3 June 1818
An Act for vesting in the surviving and new Trustees certain Estates and Property in Ireland, of the Most Honourable Waiter Marquis and Earl of Ormonde in Ireland, and Baron Butler in England, which have not been sold or disposed of under and by virtue of Three Acts of Parliament, made in the Thirty fifth, (Note: Elstub and Everley (Wiltshire) Inclosure Act 1795 (35 Geo. 3. c. 40 Pr.)) Forty fifth, (Note: Earl of Ormonde and Ossory's Estate Act 1805 (45 Geo. 3. c. lxxxiii)) and Forty eighth (Note: Earl of Ormonde's Estate Act 1808 (48 Geo. 3. c. xciii)) Years of the Reign of His present Majesty.
Danby's Estate Act 1818	58 Geo. 3. c. 36 Pr.	3 June 1818
An Act for settling a Moiety of a yearly Rent of Four hundred Pounds, discharged from certain Entails created therein, upon William Danby Esquire, and Caroline his Wife, and their Issue.
Hethersett's Estate Act 1818	58 Geo. 3. c. 37 Pr.	5 June 1818
An Act for confirming an Exchange of certain Estates in the Counties of Norfolk and Suffolk, of which Sarah Hethersett, Spinster, is Tenant for Life under the Will of her late Uncle John Barker Esquire, for certain Estates in the said Counties to which the said Sarah Hethersett and her Sisters Jane Maria Hemsworth (Wife of Henrv D'Esterre Hemsworth Esquire), Ann Amelia Hethersett Spinster, and Isabel Huntington (wife of John Barker Huntington Esquire), became entitled by Descent from their late Father James Hethersett Esquire.
Leech's Estate Act 1818	58 Geo. 3. c. 38 Pr.	5 June 1818
An Act for effecting the Sale of the settled Freehold Estates of Thomas Leech the Elder, Esquire, situate in the Counties of Lincoln, Kent and Surrey, and for applying the Monies to arise by such Sale, in manner therein mentioned.
Sidney Sussex College Estate Act 1818	58 Geo. 3. c. 39 Pr.	10 June 1818
An Act for vesting certain Pieces or Parcels of Land, and other Hereditaments, belonging to Sidney Sussex College, in the University of Cambridge, in Trustees for Sale, with Powers to lease on Fines, and for applying the Purchase Monies, and Monies to arise from Fines, in manner therein mentioned,
Uploders Inclosure Act 1818 (Note: This act was not printed by the King's Printer.)	58 Geo. 3. c. 40 Pr.	17 March 1818
An Act for inclosing Lands in the Tithing of Uploders, in the Parish of Loders, in the County of Dorset.
Tolworth Inclosure Act 1818	58 Geo. 3. c. 41 Pr.	17 March 1818
An Act for inclosing Lands within the Manor of Tolworth otherwise Talworth, in the Parish of Long Ditton, in the County of Surrey.
Schweickhert's Naturalization Act 1818	58 Geo. 3. c. 42 Pr.	17 March 1818
An Act for naturalizing John Adam Schweickhert.
Haberer's Naturalization Act 1818	58 Geo. 3. c. 43 Pr.	17 March 1818
An Act for naturalizing Martin Haberer.
Hensall Inclosure Act 1818	58 Geo. 3. c. 44 Pr.	19 March 1818
An Act for inclosing Lands in the Township of Hensall, in the Parish of Snaith, in the County of York.
Jordan's Estate Act 1818	58 Geo. 3. c. 45 Pr.	8 May 1818
An Act for confirming a Partition and Division of certain Estates situate in the County of Pembroke, and in the Town and County of the Town of Haverfordwest, late the Property of Barret Bowen Jordan Esquire, and for settling the Shares which upon the said Partition and Division were allotted to each of the Parties therein described, to the several Uses therein mentioned.
Great Comberton Inclosure Act 1818	58 Geo. 3. c. 46 Pr.	8 May 1818
An Act for inclosing Lands in the Parish of Great Comberton, in the County of Worcester.
Berwick St. Leonard Inclosure etc. Act 1818	58 Geo. 3. c. 47 Pr.	8 May 1818
An Act for inclosing and exonerating from Tithes Lands in the Parish of Berwick Saint Leonard, in the County of Wilts.
Martock Inclosure etc. Act 1818	58 Geo. 3. c. 48 Pr.	8 May 1818
An Act for allotting, exchanging and inclosing Lands at Long Load, within the Parish of Martock, in the County of Somerset.
Ulceby-with-Fotherington Inclosure Act 1818	58 Geo. 3. c. 49 Pr.	8 May 1818
An Act for inclosing Lands in the Parish of Ulceby with Fotherington otherwise Fordington, otherwise Forthington, in the County of Lincoln.
Helleston Inclosure Act 1818	58 Geo. 3. c. 50 Pr.	8 May 1818
An Act for inclosing certain Waste Lands in the Borough of Helleston, and the several Parishes of Wendron, Mawgan in Meneage, and Sithney, in the County of Cornwall.
Curry Rivell, &c. Inclosure Act 1818	58 Geo. 3. c. 51 Pr.	8 May 1818
An Act for inclosing Week Moor, in the County of Somerset, and other Lands in the several Parishes of Curry Rivell, (Note: Curry Rivel, Somerset.) Drayton, Swell and Fivehead, in the said County.
Westbourne Inclosure Act 1818	58 Geo. 3. c. 52 Pr.	8 May 1818
An Act for inclosing Lands in the Manors of Woodmancot, Nutbourne and Prinsted, in the Parish of Westbourne, in the County of Sussex.
Wilsthorpe Inclosure Act 1818	58 Geo. 3. c. 53 Pr.	8 May 1818
An Act for inclosing Lands in the Parish or Township of Wilsthorpe, in the County of Lincoln.
Tresham Inclosure Act 1818	58 Geo. 3. c. 54 Pr.	8 May 1818
An Act for inclosing Lands in the Manor of Tresham, in the Parish of Hawkesbury, in the County of Gloucester.
Bucknell, &c. Inclosure Act 1818	58 Geo. 3. c. 55 Pr.	8 May 1818
An Act for inclosing Lands in the Parishes of Bucknell and Clungunford, in the County of Salop.
Froxfield and Fyfield Inclosure Act 1818	58 Geo. 3. c. 56 Pr.	8 May 1818
An Act for inclosing Lands in the Tithings of Froxfield and Fyfield, in the Parishes of Froxfield and Milton, in the County of Wilts.
Leigh's Divorce Act 1818	58 Geo. 3. c. 57 Pr.	8 May 1818
An Act to dissolve the Marriage of Philip Leigh the younger, Gentleman, with Catherine Leigh his now Wife, and to enable him to marry again; and for other Purposes therein mentioned.
Kaye's Naturalization Act 1818	58 Geo. 3. c. 58 Pr.	8 May 1818
An Act for naturalizing Andrew Kaye.
Prevost's Naturalization Act 1818	58 Geo. 3. c. 59 Pr.	8 May 1818
An Act for naturalizing Alexander Lewis Prevost.
Rucker's Naturalization Act 1818	58 Geo. 3. c. 60 Pr.	8 May 1818
An Act for naturalizing Martin Diederich Rucker.
Count Linsingen's Naturalization Act 1818	58 Geo. 3. c. 61 Pr.	8 May 1818
An Act for naturalizing William Frederick Linsingen Count Linsingen.
Bickenhill, &c. Inclosure Act 1818	58 Geo. 3. c. 62 Pr.	23 May 1818
An Act for inclosing Lands in the Parishes of Bickenhill and Little Packington, and in the Hamlet of Diddington, all in the County of Warwick.
Hackness Inclosure Act 1818	58 Geo. 3. c. 63 Pr.	23 May 1818
An Act for inclosing Lands in the Parish of Hackness, in the North Riding of the County of York.
Skirbeck Inclosure Act 1818	58 Geo. 3. c. 64 Pr.	23 May 1818
An Act for inclosing Lands in the Parish of Skirbeck, in the County of Lincoln.
Doxat's Naturalization Act 1818	58 Geo. 3. c. 65 Pr.	23 May 1818
An Act for naturalizing Alexis James Doxat.
Lady Elcho's Name Act 1818	58 Geo. 3. c. 66 Pr.	28 May 1818
An Act to enable The Right Honourable Susan Charteris, commonly called Dowager Lady Elcho, to take and use the Surname of Tracy, and to bear the Coat of Arms of the Name and Family of Tracy, pursuant to the Will of Robert Tracy Esquire, deceased.

=== Sources ===
- The Statutes of the United Kingdom of Great Britain and Ireland, 58 George III. 1818. London. 1818 – via Internet Archive.
- The Statutes of the United Kingdom of Great Britain and Ireland, 58 George III. 1818. London. 1818 – via Google Books.
- The Statutes of the United Kingdom of Great Britain and Ireland, 58 George III. 1818. London. 1818 – via Internet Archive.
- Journals of the House of Commons. Vol. 73. London: His Majesty's Stationery Office – via Google Books.

== See also ==
- List of acts of the Parliament of the United Kingdom
