= Trade Act (No. 2) 1822 =

Act of the Parliament of the United Kingdom

- Act of Parliament
- Parliament of the United Kingdom
- Long title: An Act to regulate the Trade between His Majesty's Possessions in America and the West Indies and other Parts of the World.
- Citation: 3 Geo. 4. c. 45
- Territorial extent: United Kingdom

Dates
- Royal assent: 24 June 1822
- Commencement: 24 June 1822 (Note: The Acts of Parliament (Commencement) Act 1793.)
- Repealed: 5 July 1825

Other legislation
- Amends: See § Repealed enactments
- Repeals/revokes: See § Repealed enactments
- Repealed by: Customs Law Repeal Act 1825
- Relates to: Repeal of Acts Concerning Importation Act 1822; Repeal of Acts Concerning Importation (No. 2) Act 1822; Navigation and Commerce Act 1822; Trade Act 1822

Status: Repealed

Text of statute as originally enacted

The Trade Act (No. 2) 1822 (3 Geo. 4. c. 45) was an act of the Parliament of the United Kingdom that regulated trade between British America, the West Indies and other parts of the world.

== Background ==
The act was one of a package of measures brought before parliament in 1822 to relax the Navigation Acts and the trade laws governing Britain's American and West Indian colonies, alongside the Repeal of Acts Concerning Importation Act 1822 (3 Geo. 4. c. 41), the Repeal of Acts Concerning Importation (No. 2) Act 1822 (c. 42), the Navigation and Commerce Act 1822 (c. 43) and the Trade Act 1822 (c. 44) of the same year. Introducing the measures in the House of Lords, the Earl of Liverpool explained that they were intended to "rid the Statute book of many enactments now useless, and remove many difficulties with which the trade of the country was embarrassed." All five acts received royal assent on the same day, 24 June 1822.

== Provisions ==
=== Repealed enactments ===
Section 1 of the act repealed 6 enactments, listed in that section. The repeal did not affect the recovery of any forfeiture or penalty incurred before the act was passed, and it did not revive any act that had itself already been expressly repealed by one of the six acts listed above.

Citation	Short title	Description	Extent of repeal
25 Cha. 2. c. 7	Trade Act 1672	An Act for the Encouragement of the Greenland and Eastland Trades, and for the better securing the Plantation Trade.	So much as imposes a duty upon the exportation of sugar, tobacco, cotton wool, indigo, ginger, logwood, fustic, dying wood, and cocoa nuts, from any of His Majesty's plantations in America, Asia, or Africa.
51 Geo. 3. c. 97	Trade, Europe and American Colonies Act 1811	An Act to regulate the Trade between Places in Europe South of Cape Finisterre, and certain Ports in the British Colonies in North America.	The whole act.
52 Geo. 3. c. 98	Colonial Trade Act 1812	An Act to permit Sugar, Coffee, and Cocoa, to be exported from His Majesty's Colonies and Plantations to any Port in Europe to the South of Cape Finisterre, and Corn to be imported from any such Port, and from the Coast of Africa into the said Colonies and Plantations, under Licences granted by the Collectors and Comptrollers of the Customs.	The whole act.
55 Geo. 3. c. 29	Trade of Malta Act 1815	An Act to regulate the Trade between Malta and its Dependencies and His Majesty's Colonies and Plantations in America, and also between Malta and the United Kingdom.	So much as relates to the trade allowed to be carried on between the Island of Malta and the Dependencies thereof, and His Majesty's Colonies and Plantations in America.
57 Geo. 3. c. 4	Gibraltar Trade Act 1817	An Act to extend the Privileges of the Trade of Malta to the Port of Gibraltar.	The whole act.
57 Geo. 3. c. 89	Importation (No. 4) Act 1817	An Act to allow the Importation of Oranges and Lemons from the Azores and the Madeiras into the British Colonies in North America.	The whole act.

== Subsequent developments ==
The whole act was repealed by the Customs Law Repeal Act 1825 (6 Geo. 4. c. 105), which came into force on 5 July 1825.
