= List of acts of the Parliament of the United Kingdom from 1822 =

This is a complete list of acts of the Parliament of the United Kingdom for the year 1822.

Note that the first parliament of the United Kingdom was held in 1801; parliaments between 1707 and 1800 were either parliaments of Great Britain or of Ireland). For acts passed up until 1707, see the list of acts of the Parliament of England and the list of acts of the Parliament of Scotland. For acts passed from 1707 to 1800, see the list of acts of the Parliament of Great Britain. See also the list of acts of the Parliament of Ireland.

For acts of the devolved parliaments and assemblies in the United Kingdom, see the list of acts of the Scottish Parliament, the list of acts of the Northern Ireland Assembly, and the list of acts and measures of Senedd Cymru; see also the list of acts of the Parliament of Northern Ireland.

The number shown after each act's title is its chapter number. Acts passed before 1963 are cited using this number, preceded by the year(s) of the reign during which the relevant parliamentary session was held; thus the Union with Ireland Act 1800 is cited as "39 & 40 Geo. 3 c. 67", meaning the 67th act passed during the session that started in the 39th year of the reign of George III and which finished in the 40th year of that reign. Note that the modern convention is to use Arabic numerals in citations (thus "41 Geo. 3" rather than "41 Geo. III"). Acts of the last session of the Parliament of Great Britain and the first session of the Parliament of the United Kingdom are both cited as "41 Geo. 3". Acts passed from 1963 onwards are simply cited by calendar year and chapter number.

All modern acts have a short title, e.g. the Local Government Act 2003. Some earlier acts also have a short title given to them by later acts, such as by the Short Titles Act 1896.

== 3 Geo. 4 ==
The third session of the 7th Parliament of the United Kingdom, which met from 5 February 1822 until 6 August 1822.

This session was also traditionally cited as 3 G. 4.

=== Public general acts ===
Short title	Citation	Royal assent
Long title
Suppression of Insurrections (Ireland) Act 1822 or the Insurrection Act 1822 (repealed)	3 Geo. 4. c. 1	11 February 1822
An Act to suppress Insurrections and prevent Disturbance of the Public Peace in Ireland, until the First Day of August One thousand eight hundred and twenty two. (Repealed by Statute Law Revision Act 1873 (36 & 37 Vict. c. 91))
Habeas Corpus Suspension (Ireland) Act 1822 (repealed)	3 Geo. 4. c. 2	11 February 1822
An Act to empower the Lord Lieutenant, or other Chief Governor or Governors of Ireland, to apprehend and detain, until the First Day of August One thousand eight hundred and twenty two, such Persons as he or they shall suspect of conspiring against His Majesty's Person and Government. (Repealed by Statute Law Revision Act 1873 (36 & 37 Vict. c. 91))
Indemnity for Seizing Arms, etc. (Ireland) Act 1822 (repealed)	3 Geo. 4. c. 3	11 March 1822
An Act for indemnifying such Persons as have seized or detained any Arms or Gunpowder in Ireland, since the First Day of November One thousand eight hundred and twenty one, for the Preservation of the Public Peace. (Repealed by Statute Law Revision Act 1873 (36 & 37 Vict. c. 91))
Arms (Ireland) Act 1822 (repealed)	3 Geo. 4. c. 4	11 March 1822
An Act to regulate the Importation of Arms, Gunpowder and Ammunition into Ireland, and the making, removing, selling, and keeping of Arms, Gunpowder and Ammunition in Ireland, for Seven Years, and from thence until the End of the then next Session of Parliament. (Repealed by Statute Law Revision Act 1873 (36 & 37 Vict. c. 91))
Census (Ireland) Act 1822 (repealed)	3 Geo. 4. c. 5	11 March 1822
An Act to repeal so much of an Act made in the Fifty fifth Tear of the Reign of His late Majesty, (Note: Census (Ireland) Act 1815 (55 Geo. 3. c. 120)) for taking an Account of the Population of Ireland as relates to certain Expences to be incurred under the said Act. (Repealed by Census (Ireland) Act 1840 (3 & 4 Vict. c. 100) and Statute Law Revision Act 1873 (36 & 37 Vict. c. 91))
Duties on Sugar, etc. Act 1822 (repealed)	3 Geo. 4. c. 6	11 March 1822
An Act for continuing to His Majesty certain Duties on Sugar, Tobacco and Snuff, Foreign Spirits and Sweets, in Great Britain; and on Pensions, Offices and Personal Estates in England; and for receiving the Contributions of Persons receiving Pensions and holding Offices; for the Service of the Year One thousand eight hundred and twenty two. (Repealed by Statute Law Revision Act 1873 (36 & 37 Vict. c. 91))
Supply Act 1822 (repealed)	3 Geo. 4. c. 7	11 March 1822
An Act for applying certain Monies therein mentioned for the Service of the Year One thousand eight hundred and twenty two. (Repealed by Statute Law Revision Act 1873 (36 & 37 Vict. c. 91))
Exchequer Bills Act 1822 (repealed)	3 Geo. 4. c. 8	11 March 1822
An Act for raising the Sum of Twenty Millions by Exchequer Bills, for the Service of the Year One thousand eight hundred and twenty two. (Repealed by Statute Law Revision Act 1873 (36 & 37 Vict. c. 91))
Reduction of National Debt Act 1822 (repealed)	3 Geo. 4. c. 9	15 March 1822
An Act for transferring several Annuities of Five Pounds pet Centum per Annum into Annuities of Four Pounds per Centum per Annum. (Repealed by Statute Law Revision Act 1870 (33 & 34 Vict. c. 69))
Assize Commission Act 1822 (repealed)	3 Geo. 4. c. 10	15 March 1822
An Act to enable, in certain Cases, the Opening and Reading of Commissions under which the Judges sit upon the Circuits, after the Day appointed for holding Assizes. (Repealed by Supreme Court of Judicature (Consolidation) Act 1925 (15 & 16 Geo. 5. c. 49))
Marine Mutiny Act 1822 (repealed)	3 Geo. 4. c. 11	21 March 1822
An Act for the regulating of His Majesty's Royal Marine Forces while on Shore. (Repealed by Statute Law Revision Act 1873 (36 & 37 Vict. c. 91))
Indemnity Act 1822 (repealed)	3 Geo. 4. c. 12	21 March 1822
An Act to indemnify such Persons in the United Kingdom as have omitted to qualify themselves for Offices and Employments, and for extending the Time limited for those Purposes respectively, until the Twenty fifth Day of March One thousand eight hundred and twenty three; and to permit such Persons in Great Britain as have omitted to make and file Affidavits of the Execution of Indentures of Clerks to Attornies and Solicitors, to make and file the same on or before the last Day of Trinity Term One thousand eight hundred and twenty two, and to allow Persons to make and file such Affidavits, although the Persons whom they served shall have neglected to take out their Annual Certificates. (Repealed by Promissory Oaths Act 1871 (34 & 35 Vict. c. 48))
Mutiny Act 1822 (repealed)	3 Geo. 4. c. 13	21 March 1822
An Act for punishing Mutiny and Desertion; and for the better Payment of the Army and their Quarters. (Repealed by Statute Law Revision Act 1873 (36 & 37 Vict. c. 91))
Land Tax Commissioners Act 1822 (repealed)	3 Geo. 4. c. 14	21 March 1822
An Act for rectifying Mistakes in the Names of the Land Tax Commissioners, and for appointing additional Commissioners, and indemnifying such Persons as have acted without due Authority in Execution of the Acts therein recited. (Repealed by Statute Law Revision Act 1873 (36 & 37 Vict. c. 91))
Aliens Act 1822 (repealed)	3 Geo. 4. c. 15	21 March 1822
An Act for further continuing, until the Twenty fifth Day of March One thousand eight hundred and twenty three, an Act of the Fifty eighth Year of His late Majesty, (Note: Aliens (No. 2) Act 1818 (58 Geo. 3. c. 97)) for preventing Aliens from becoming naturalized, or being made or becoming Denizens, except in certain Cases. (Repealed by Statute Law Revision Act 1873 (36 & 37 Vict. c. 91))
Solicitors (Ireland) Act 1822 (repealed)	3 Geo. 4. c. 16	3 April 1822
An Act to amend an Act, made in the last Session of Parliament, (Note: Solicitors (Ireland) Act 1821 (1 & 2 Geo. 4. c. 48)) for amending the several Acts for the Regulation of Attornies and Solicitors. (Repealed by Statute Law Revision Act 1891 (54 & 55 Vict. c. 67))
National Debt Act 1822 (repealed)	3 Geo. 4. c. 17	3 April 1822
An Act for converting Annuities and Debentures of Five Pounds per Centum per Annum, payable at the Bank of Ireland, into new Annuities of Four Pounds per Centum per Annum. (Repealed by Statute Law Revision Act 1870 (33 & 34 Vict. c. 69))
Duties on Malt Act 1822 (repealed)	3 Geo. 4. c. 18	3 April 1822
An Act to repeal the Excise Duty on Malt charged by an Act made in the Second Year of His present Majesty, (Note: Duties on Malt, etc. Act 1821 (1 & 2 Geo. 4. c. 3)) to allow the said Duty on Malt in Stock, and to make Regulations for better securing the Duties on Malt. (Repealed by Statute Law Revision Act 1875 (38 & 39 Vict. c. 66))
Commissioners of the Admiralty Act 1822 (repealed)	3 Geo. 4. c. 19	3 April 1822
An Act to enable Two or more of the Commissioners for executing the Office of Lord High Admiral of the United Kingdom of Great Britain and Ireland, when the Number of such Commissioners is less than Six, to do certain Acts heretofore done by Three or more of the same Commissioners. (Repealed by Admiralty Act 1832 (2 & 3 Will. 4. c. 40))
Quartering of Soldiers Act 1822 (repealed)	3 Geo. 4. c. 20	15 May 1822
An Act for fixing the Rates of Subsistence to be paid to Innkeepers and others on quartering Soldiers. (Repealed by Statute Law Revision Act 1873 (36 & 37 Vict. c. 91))
Fever Hospitals (Ireland) Act 1822 (repealed)	3 Geo. 4. c. 21	15 May 1822
An Act to amend an Act passed in the Fifty eighth Year of the Reign of His late Majesty King George the Third, (Note: Hospitals (Ireland) Act 1818 (58 Geo. 3. c. 47)) for establishing Fever Hospitals, and for making other Regulations for Relief of the suffering Poor, and for preventing the Increase of infectious Fevers in Ireland. (Repealed by Statute Law Revision Act 1873 (36 & 37 Vict. c. 91))
Support of Commercial Credit (Ireland) Act 1822 (repealed)	3 Geo. 4. c. 22	15 May 1822
An Act to amend an Act, passed in the First Year of His present Majesty's Reign, (Note: Support of Commercial Credit (Ireland) Act 1820 (1 Geo. 4. c. 39)) for the Assistance of Trade and Manufactures in Ireland, by authorizing the Advance of certain Sums for the Support of Commercial Credit there. (Repealed by Statute Law Revision Act 1873 (36 & 37 Vict. c. 91))
Summary Proceedings Act 1822 (repealed)	3 Geo. 4. c. 23	15 May 1822
An Act to facilitate Summary Proceedings before Justices of the Peace and others. (Repealed by Summary Jurisdiction Act 1848 (11 & 12 Vict. c. 43))
Receivers of Stolen Goods, etc. Act 1822 (repealed)	3 Geo. 4. c. 24	15 May 1822
An Act for extending the Laws against Receivers of Stolen Goods to Receivers of Stolen Bonds, Bank Notes, and other Securities for Money. (Repealed for England and Wales by Criminal Statutes Repeal Act 1827 (7 & 8 Geo. 4. c. 27), for Ireland by Criminal Statutes (Ireland) Repeal Act 1828 (9 Geo. 4. c. 53) and for India by Criminal Law (India) Act 1828 (9 Geo. 4. c. 74))
Starch and Soap Duties Allowances Act 1822 (repealed)	3 Geo. 4. c. 25	15 May 1822
An Act to continue, until the Twenty fifth Day of January One thousand eight hundred and twenty six, an Act of the Twenty third Year of His late Majesty, (Note: Flax, etc., Manufacture Act 1783 (23 Geo. 3. c. 77)) for the more effectual Encouragement of the Manufacture of Flax and Cotton in Great Britain; and to amend the Law in respect of the Allowances of Excise Duties on Starch and Soap used in certain Manufactures. (Repealed by Statute Law Revision Act 1861 (24 & 25 Vict. c. 101))
Advances by Bank of Ireland Act 1822 (repealed)	3 Geo. 4. c. 26	15 May 1822
An Act to reduce the Rate of Interest payable on the Sum of One million two hundred and fifty thousand Pounds, advanced by the Governor and Company of the Bank of Ireland for the Public Service, under an Act made in the Forty eighth Year of His late Majesty. (Note: Bank of Ireland Act 1808 (48 Geo. 3. c. 103)) (Repealed by Statute Law Revision Act 1870 (33 & 34 Vict. c. 69))
Excise Licences Act 1822 (repealed)	3 Geo. 4. c. 27	15 May 1822
An Act to amend and continue, until the Fifth Day of July One thousand eight hundred and twenty six, so much of an Act made in the Fifty fifth Year of His late Majesty, (Note: Excise (No. 2) Act 1815 (55 Geo. 3. c. 30)) as relates to additional Duties of Excise, in Great Britain, on Excise licences. (Repealed by Statute Law Revision Act 1873 (36 & 37 Vict. c. 91))
Bounties on British and Irish Linens Act 1822 (repealed)	3 Geo. 4. c. 28	15 May 1822
An Act to continue, so long as the Bounties now payable on Irish Linens when exported from Ireland shall continue, the Bounties on British and Irish Linen exported. (Repealed by Customs Law Repeal Act 1825 (6 Geo. 4. c. 105))
Payment of Creditors (Scotland) Act 1822 (repealed)	3 Geo. 4. c. 29	15 May 1822
An Act to continue, until the Twenty fifth Day of January One thousand eight hundred and twenty three, and from thence to the End of the then next Session of Parliament, an Act made in the Fifty fourth Year of His late Majesty, (Note: Payment of Creditors (Scotland) Act 1814 (54 Geo. 3. c. 137)) for rendering the Payment of Creditors more equal and expeditious in Scotland. (Repealed by Statute Law Revision Act 1873 (36 & 37 Vict. c. 91))
Duty on Beer or Bigg Malt Act 1822 (repealed)	3 Geo. 4. c. 30	15 May 1822
An Act for reducing, during the Continuance of the present Duty on Malt, the Duty on Malt made from Bear or Bigg only, in Scotland. (Repealed by Inland Revenue Act 1880 (43 & 44 Vict. c. 20))
Duties on Malt, etc. Act 1822 (repealed)	3 Geo. 4. c. 31	15 May 1822
An Act to grant Countervailing Duties, and to allow equivalent Drawbacks on Malt, Beer and joints imported and exported between Great Britain and Ireland. (Repealed by Statute Law Revision Act 1873 (36 & 37 Vict. c. 91))
Duties on Plain Silk Net or Tulle Act 1822 (repealed)	3 Geo. 4. c. 32	24 May 1822
An Act for repealing the Duties on plain Silk Net or Tulle, and for granting new Duties in lieu thereof. (Repealed by Statute Law Revision Act 1861 (24 & 25 Vict. c. 101))
Riotous Assemblies (Scotland) Act 1822	3 Geo. 4. c. 33	24 May 1822
An Act for altering and amending several Acts passed in the First (Note: Riot Act 1714 (1 Geo. 1. St. 2. c. 5)) and Ninth (Note: Criminal Law Act 1722 (9 Geo. 1. c. 22)) years of the Reign of King George the First, and in the Forty-first, (Note: Compensation for Injuries to Mills, etc. Act 1801 (41 Geo. 3. (U.K.). c. 24)) Fifty-second, (Note: Malicious Damage Act 1812 (52 Geo. 3. c. 130)) Fifty-sixth (Note: Malicious Damage (Scotland) Act 1816 (56 Geo. 3. c. 125)) and Fifty-seventh (Note: Seditious Meetings Act 1817 (57 Geo. 3. c. 19)) Years of the Reign of His late Majesty King George the Third, so far as the same relate to the Recovery of Damages committed by riotous and tumultuous Assemblies and unlawful and malicious Offenders.
Employment of the Poor (Ireland) Act 1822 (repealed)	3 Geo. 4. c. 34	24 May 1822
An Act for the Employment of the Poor in certain Districts in Ireland. (Repealed by Statute Law Revision Act 1873 (36 & 37 Vict. c. 91))
Dublin Foundling Hospital Act 1822 (repealed)	3 Geo. 4. c. 35	24 May 1822
An Act to make perpetual, and to amend, several Acts made in the Thirty eighth, (Note: Dublin Workhouse, &c. Act 1798 (38 Geo. 3. c. 35 (I))) Fortieth (Note: Rotunda Hospital Act 1800 (40 Geo. 3. c. 33 (I))) and Fiftieth (Note: Dublin Foundling Hospital Act 1810 (50 Geo. 3. c. cxcii)) Years of the Reign of His late Majesty King George the Third, for the Management, Support, Regulation and Maintenance of the Foundling Hospital in Dublin; and to make further Provision for the Regulation and Maintenance of the said Hospital. (Repealed by Statute Law (Repeals) Act 2013 (c. 2))
Duty on Malt (Ireland) Act 1822 (repealed)	3 Geo. 4. c. 36	24 June 1822
An Act to reduce the Duty of Excise on Malt made in Ireland, and certain Drawbacks in respect thereof. (Repealed by Statute Law Revision Act 1873 (36 & 37 Vict. c. 91))
Inquiry into Collection, etc., of Revenue Act 1822 (repealed)	3 Geo. 4. c. 37	24 June 1822
An Act to extend the Powers of the Commissioners appointed by an Act, passed in the last Session of Parliament, (Note: Revenue (Ireland) Act 1821 (1 & 2 Geo. 4. c. 90)) for inquiring into the Collection and Management of the Revenue in Ireland. (Repealed by Statute Law Revision Act 1873 (36 & 37 Vict. c. 91))
Punishment for Manslaughter, etc. Act 1822 (repealed)	3 Geo. 4. c. 38	24 June 1822
An Act for the further and more adequate Punishment of Persons convicted of Manslaughter, and of Servants convicted of robbing their Masters, and of Accessories before the Fact to Grand Larceny, and certain other Felonies. (Repealed by Statute Law Revision Act 1861 (24 & 25 Vict. c. 101))
Warrants of Attorney Act 1822 (repealed)	3 Geo. 4. c. 39	24 June 1822
An Act for preventing Frauds upon Creditors, by secret Warrants of Attorney to confess Judgment. (Repealed by Administration of Justice Act 1956 (4 & 5 Eliz. 2. c. 46))
Vagrancy (England) Act 1822 (repealed)	3 Geo. 4. c. 40	24 June 1822
An Act for consolidating into One Act and amending the Laws relating to idle and disorderly Persons, Rogues and Vagabonds, incorrigible Rogues and other Vagrants, in England. (Repealed by Vagrancy Act 1824 (5 Geo. 4. c. 83))
Repeal of Acts Concerning Importation Act 1822 (repealed)	3 Geo. 4. c. 41	24 June 1822
An Act to repeal divers ancient Statutes and Parts of Statutes, so far as they relate to the Importation and Exportation of Goods and Merchandize from and to Foreign Countries. (Repealed by Statute Law Revision Act 1873 (36 & 37 Vict. c. 91))
Repeal of Acts Concerning Importation (No. 2) Act 1822 (repealed)	3 Geo. 4. c. 42	24 June 1822
An Act to repeal certain Acts, and Parts of Acts, relating to the Importation of Goods and Merchandize. (Repealed by Statute Law Revision Act 1873 (36 & 37 Vict. c. 91))
Navigation and Commerce Act 1822 (repealed)	3 Geo. 4. c. 43	24 June 1822
An Act for the Encouragement of Navigation and Commerce, by regulating the Importation of Goods and Merchandize, so far as relates to the Countries or Places from whence, and the Ships in which such Importation shall be made. (Repealed by Customs Law Repeal Act 1825 (6 Geo. 4. c. 105))
Trade Act 1822 or the West Indian and American Trade Act 1822 (repealed)	3 Geo. 4. c. 44	24 June 1822
An Act to regulate the Trade between His Majesty's Possessions in America and the West Indies and other Places in America and the West Indies. (Repealed by Customs Law Repeal Act 1825 (6 Geo. 4. c. 105))
Trade Act (No. 2) 1822 (repealed)	3 Geo. 4. c. 45	24 June 1822
An Act to regulate the Trade between His Majesty's Possessions in America and the West Indies and other Parts of the World. (Repealed by Customs Law Repeal Act 1825 (6 Geo. 4. c. 105))
Levy of Fines Act 1822 (repealed)	3 Geo. 4. c. 46	24 June 1822
An Act for the more speedy Return and Levying of Fines, Penalties and Forfeitures, and Recognizances estreated. (Repealed by Criminal Justice Act 1967 (c. 80))
Rate of Interest Act 1822 (repealed)	3 Geo. 4. c. 47	24 June 1822
An Act to repeal an Act of His present Majesty, (Note: Rate of Interest Act 1821 (1 & 2 Geo. 4. c. 51)) for explaining an Act made in the Twelfth Year of Queen Anne, (Note: Usury Act 1713 (13 Ann. c. 15)) to reduce the Rate of Interest without Prejudice to Parliamentary Securities, and to Substitute other Provisions in lieu thereof. (Repealed by Statute Law Revision Act 1861 (24 & 25 Vict. c. 101))
Tonnage Duties Act 1822 (repealed)	3 Geo. 4. c. 48	1 July 1822
An Act to repeal certain Tonnage Duties of Customs on Ships or Vessels. (Repealed by Statute Law Revision Act 1873 (36 & 37 Vict. c. 91))
Sheriffs of Edinburgh and Lanark Act 1822 (repealed)	3 Geo. 4. c. 49	1 July 1822
An Act concerning the Residence of Sheriffs Depute of the Counties of Edinburgh and Lanark. (Repealed by Sheriff Courts (Scotland) Act 1971 (c. 58))
Assessed Taxes Act 1822 (repealed)	3 Geo. 4. c. 50	1 July 1822
An Act to extend the Period allowed to Persons compounding for their Assessed Taxes, and to give further Relief in certain Cases therein mentioned. (Repealed by Revenue Act 1869 (32 & 33 Vict. c. 14))
Dead-weight Annuity Act 1822 (repealed)	3 Geo. 4. c. 51	1 July 1822
An Act for apportioning the Burthen occasioned by the Military and Naval Pensions and Civil Superannuations, by vesting an equal Annuity in Trustees for the Payment thereof. (Repealed by Superannuation, etc. Act 1828 (9 Geo. 4. c. 79))
Illicit Distillation (Scotland) Act 1822 (repealed)	3 Geo. 4. c. 52	5 July 1822
An Act to grant certain Duties, in Scotland, upon Wash and Spirits made from Corn or Grain, and upon Licences for making and keeping of Stills; and to regulate the Distillation of such Spirits for Home Consumption; and for better preventing private Distillation in Scotland, until the Tenth Day of November One thousand eight hundred and twenty four. (Repealed by Customs and Excise Act 1952 (15 & 16 Geo. 6 & 1 Eliz. 2. c. 44))
Manufacture of Scorched Corn, etc. Act 1822 (repealed)	3 Geo. 4. c. 53	5 July 1822
An Act to regulate the Manufacture and Sale of scorched or roasted Corn, Peas, Beans or Parsnips, and of Cocoa Paste, Broma and other Mixtures of Cocoa. (Repealed by Statute Law Revision Act 1873 (36 & 37 Vict. c. 91))
Duties on Fire Hearths, etc. (Ireland) Act 1822 (repealed)	3 Geo. 4. c. 54	5 July 1822
An Act to repeal the Rates, Duties and Taxes payable in respect of Fire Hearths and Windows in Ireland; and to exempt certain Persons from the Tax on Dogs. (Repealed by Statute Law Revision Act 1873 (36 & 37 Vict. c. 91))
Police Magistrates, Metropolis Act 1822 (repealed)	3 Geo. 4. c. 55	5 July 1822
An Act for the more effectual Administration of the Office of a Justice of the Peace in and near the Metropolis, and for the more effectual Prevention of Depredations on the River Thames and its Vicinity, for Seven Years. (Repealed by Police Magistrates, Metropolis Act 1833 (3 & 4 Will. 4. c. 19))
Offices in the Exchequer (Ireland) Act 1822 (repealed)	3 Geo. 4. c. 56	5 July 1822
An Act to provide for the more effectual Regulation of certain Offices relating to the Receipt of His Majesty's Exchequer in Ireland. (Repealed by Statute Law Revision Act 1873 (36 & 37 Vict. c. 91))
Kilmainham and Chelsea Hospitals Act 1822 (repealed)	3 Geo. 4. c. 57	5 July 1822
An Act for transferring such of the Duties of the Commissioners or Governors of Kilmainham Hospital, as relate to the Management and Payment of Out Pensions, to the Commissioners of Chelsea Hospital. (Repealed by Chelsea and Kilmainham Hospitals Act 1826 (7 Geo. 4. c. 16))
Improvements at Westminster Act 1822	3 Geo. 4. c. 58	5 July 1822
An Act for enabling the Commissioners of His Majesty's Woods, Forests and Land Revenues to effect Improvements in the Neighbourhood of Parliament Street and Privy Garden, within the Liberty of Westminster.
Duties on Coals, etc. Act 1822 (repealed)	3 Geo. 4. c. 59	5 July 1822
An Act to continue, until the Fifth Day of July One thousand eight hundred and twenty four, the Low Duties on Coals and Culm carried coastwise to any Port within the Principality of Wales. (Repealed by Statute Law Revision Act 1873 (36 & 37 Vict. c. 91))
Importation Act 1822 (repealed)	3 Geo. 4. c. 60	15 July 1822
An Act to amend the Laws relating to the Importation of Corn. (Repealed for the United Kingdom by Importation of Corn Act 1828 (9 Geo. 4. c. 60) and for the Isle of Man by Statute Law Revision (Isle of Man) Act 1991 (c. 61))
National Debt (No. 2) Act 1822 (repealed)	3 Geo. 4. c. 61	15 July 1822
An Act to regulate the Performance of certain Contracts, and to authorize the Courts of Chancery and Exchequer to make Orders in Cases which may arise out of the Conversion of certain Annuities of Five Pounds per Centum per Annum into Annuities of Four Pounds per Centum per Annum; and for paying off such Proprietors of Five Pounds per Centum Annuities as shall dissent from receiving Four Pounds per Centum Annuities in lieu thereof. (Repealed by Statute Law Revision Act 1870 (33 & 34 Vict. c. 69))
Fees in Office of Lord Register of Scotland Act 1822 (repealed)	3 Geo. 4. c. 62	15 July 1822
An Act for regulating the Fees chargeable in His Majesty's General Register House at Edinburgh, and for completing the Buildings necessary for keeping the Public Records of Scotland therein. (Repealed by Statute Law Revision Act 1890 (53 & 54 Vict. c. 33))
Crown Lands (Ireland) Act 1822	3 Geo. 4. c. 63	15 July 1822
An Act to authorize the Sale of Quit Rents and other Rents, and the Sale and Demise of Lands, Tithes, Tenements and Hereditaments, the Property of His Majesty in Right of the Crown, in Ireland.
Prisons (Ireland) Act 1822 (repealed)	3 Geo. 4. c. 64	22 July 1822
An Act to amend the Laws relating to Prisons in Ireland. (Repealed by Prisons (Ireland) Act 1826 (7 Geo. 4. c. 74))
Growing Produce of Consolidated Fund Act 1822 (repealed)	3 Geo. 4. c. 65	22 July 1822
An Act to continue, until the Fifth Day of July One thousand eight hundred and twenty three, an Act of the Fifty ninth Year of His late Majesty, (Note: Produce of Consolidated Fund Act 1819 (59 Geo. 3. c. 19)) for rendering the growing Produce of the Consolidated Fund of the United Kingdom, arising in Great Britain, available for the Public Service. (Repealed by Statute Law Revision Act 1873 (36 & 37 Vict. c. 91))
National Debt (No. 3) Act 1822 (repealed)	3 Geo. 4. c. 66	22 July 1822
An Act for authorizing the Commissioners for the Reduction of the National Debt to discharge the Exchequer Bills Issued to pay the Proprietors of Five Pounds per Centum Annuities, who dissented from receiving Four Pounds per Centum Annuities in lieu thereof. (Repealed by Statute Law Revision Act 1870 (33 & 34 Vict. c. 69))
Excise Licences (No. 2) Act 1822 (repealed)	3 Geo. 4. c. 67	22 July 1822
An Act to repeal so much of the Excise Licences Act of the present Session (Note: Excise Licences Act 1822 (3 Geo. 4. c. 27)) as regards the carrying on of Trade in more than One Place. (Repealed by Statute Law Revision Act 1873 (36 & 37 Vict. c. 91))
National Debt (No. 4) Act 1822 (repealed)	3 Geo. 4. c. 68	22 July 1822
An Act to provide for the Charge of the Addition to the Public Funded Debt of Great Britain and Ireland, for defraying the Expence of Military and Naval Pensions and Civil Superannuations. (Repealed by Statute Law Revision Act 1870 (33 & 34 Vict. c. 69))
Fees in Common Law Courts Act 1822 (repealed)	3 Geo. 4. c. 69	22 July 1822
An Act to enable the Judges of the several Courts of Record at Westminster to make Regulations respecting the Fees of the Officers, Clerks and Ministers of the said Courts. (Repealed by Statute Law Revision Act 1874 (37 & 38 Vict. c. 35))
Negotiation of Notes and Bills Act 1822 (repealed)	3 Geo. 4. c. 70	22 July 1822
An Act to continue, until the Fifth Day of January One thousand eight hundred and thirty three, an Act of the Thirty seventh Year of His late Majesty, (Note: Negotiation of Notes and Bills Act 1797 (37 Geo. 3. c. 32)) for suspending the Operation of an Act of the Seventeenth Year of His late Majesty, (Note: Bill of Exchange Act 1776 (17 Geo. 3. c. 30)) for restraining the Negotiation oi Promissory Notes and Bills of Exchange, under a limited Sum, in England. (Repealed by Bank Notes Act 1826 (7 Geo. 4. c. 6))
Cruel Treatment of Cattle Act 1822 or Martin's Act (repealed)	3 Geo. 4. c. 71	22 July 1822
An Act to prevent the cruel and improper Treatment of Cattle. (Repealed by Cruelty to Animals Act 1835 (5 & 6 Will. 4. c. 59))
Church Building Act 1822 (repealed)	3 Geo. 4. c. 72	22 July 1822
An Act to amend and render more effectual Two Acts, passed in the Fifty-eighth (Note: Church Building Act 1818 (58 Geo. 3. c. 45)) and Fifty-ninth (Note: Church Building Act 1819 (59 Geo. 3. c. 134)) Years of His late Majesty, for building and promoting the building of additional Churches in populous Parishes. (Repealed by Statute Law (Repeals) Measure 2018 (No. 1))
National Debt (No. 5) Act 1822 (repealed)	3 Geo. 4. c. 73	22 July 1822
An Act for raising a Loan of Seven millions five hundred thousand Pounds from the Commissioners for the Reduction of the National Debt. (Repealed by Statute Law Revision Act 1861 (24 & 25 Vict. c. 101))
Bankrupts Act 1822 (repealed)	3 Geo. 4. c. 74	22 July 1822
An Act to amend the Laws relating to Bankrupts under Joint Commissions. (Repealed by Statute Law Revision Act 1861 (24 & 25 Vict. c. 101))
Confirmation of Marriages Act 1822 (repealed)	3 Geo. 4. c. 75	22 July 1822
An Act to amend certain Provisions of the Twenty sixth of George the Second, (Note: Clandestine Marriages Act 1753 (26 Geo. 2. c. 33)) for the better preventing of Clandestine Marriages. (Repealed by Statute Law (Repeals) Act 1977 (c. 18))
Drawback on Malt for Distilling Act 1822 (repealed)	3 Geo. 4. c. 76	22 July 1822
An Act to amend an Act of the last Session of Parliament, (Note: Drawback on Malt Act 1821 (1 & 2 Geo. 4. c. 82)) for allowing to Distillers for Home Consumption in Scotland a Drawback of a Portion of the Duty on Malt used by them. (Repealed by Statute Law Revision Act 1873 (36 & 37 Vict. c. 91))
Licensing of Ale Houses Act 1822 (repealed)	3 Geo. 4. c. 77	26 July 1822
An Act for amending the Laws for regulating the Manner of Licensing Alehouses in that Part of the United Kingdom called England, and for the more effectually preventing Disorders therein. (Repealed by Statute Law Revision Act 1873 (36 & 37 Vict. c. 91))
Leases of Lands of Duchy of Cornwall Act 1822 (repealed)	3 Geo. 4. c. 78	26 July 1822
An Act to enable His Majesty to make Leases, Copies and Grants of Offices, Lands and Hereditaments, Parcel of the Duchy of Cornwall, or annexed to the same. (Repealed by Statute Law Revision Act 1873 (36 & 37 Vict. c. 91))
Endowed Schools (Ireland) Act 1822 (repealed)	3 Geo. 4. c. 79	26 July 1822
An Act to amend an Act of the Fifty-third year of the Reign of His late Majesty, (Note: Endowed Schools (Ireland) Act 1813 (53 Geo. 3. c. 107)) for the Appointment of Commissioners for the Regulation of the several endowed Schools in Ireland. (Repealed by Education (Northern Ireland) Order 1980 (SI 1980/1958))
Suppression of Insurrections (Ireland) (No. 2) Act 1822 (repealed)	3 Geo. 4. c. 80	26 July 1822
An Act to continue, until the First Day of August One thousand eight hundred and twenty three, an Act made in this present Session of Parliament, (Note: Suppression of Insurrections (Ireland) Act 1822 (3 Geo. 4. c. 1)) for suppressing Insurrections and preventing Disturbances of the Public Peace in Ireland. (Repealed by Statute Law Revision Act 1873 (36 & 37 Vict. c. 91))
Bankrupt Laws (England) Act 1822 (repealed)	3 Geo. 4. c. 81	26 July 1822
An Act to amend the Laws relating to Bankrupts. (Repealed by Bankruptcy Act 1825 (6 Geo. 4. c. 16))
Duties on Salt Act 1822 (repealed)	3 Geo. 4. c. 82	26 July 1822
An Act for reducing the Duties of Excise payable upon Salt in England, and repealing the Duties upon Salt (not being Foreign Salt,) and reducing the Duties upon Foreign Salt payable in Scotland. (Repealed by Statute Law Revision Act 1873 (36 & 37 Vict. c. 91))
Duties and Drawbacks on Leather Act 1822 (repealed)	3 Geo. 4. c. 83	26 July 1822
An Act to repeal the additional Duties and Drawbacks on Leather, granted and allowed by Two Acts of His late Majesty, (Note: Excise (No. 3) Act 1812 (52 Geo. 3. c. 94)) (Note: Trades of Tanners and Curriers Act 1816 (56 Geo. 3. c. 110)) and to grant other Drawbacks in lieu thereof, and to secure the Duties on Leather. (Repealed by Statute Law Revision Act 1873 (36 & 37 Vict. c. 91))
Advances for Relief of Distress (Ireland) Act 1822 (repealed)	3 Geo. 4. c. 84	26 July 1822
An Act to authorize certain temporary Advances of Money, for the Relief of the Distresses existing in Ireland. (Repealed by Statute Law Revision Act 1873 (36 & 37 Vict. c. 91))
Jurors in Criminal Trials (Scotland) Act 1822 (repealed)	3 Geo. 4. c. 85	26 July 1822
An Act to allow peremptory Challenge of Jurors in Criminal Trials in Scotland. (Repealed by Juries Act 1825 (6 Geo. 4. c. 50))
Public Works Loans Act 1822 (repealed)	3 Geo. 4. c. 86	26 July 1822
An Act to amend Two Acts of the Fifty seventh Year of His late Majesty, (Note: Public Works Loans Act 1817 (57 Geo. 3. c. 34)) (Note: Public Works Loans (No. 2) Act 1817 (57 Geo. 3. c. 124)) and the First Year of His present Majesty, (Note: Public Works Loans Act 1820 (1 Geo. 4. c. 60)) for authorizing the Issue of Exchequer Bills, and the Advance of Money for carrying on Public Works and Fisheries, and Employment of the Poor; and to authorize a further Issue of Exchequer Bills for the Purposes of the said Acts. (Repealed by Public Works Loans Act 1875 (38 & 39 Vict. c. 89))
Court of Exchequer Act 1822 (repealed)	3 Geo. 4. c. 87	26 July 1822
An Act to enable His Majesty's Court of Exchequer to sit, and the Lord Chief Baron or any other Baron of the said Court to try Middlesex Issues, elsewhere than in the Place where the Court of Exchequer is commonly kept in the County of Middlesex. (Repealed by Statute Law Revision Act 1873 (36 & 37 Vict. c. 91))
Land and Assessed Taxes Act 1822 (repealed)	3 Geo. 4. c. 88	29 July 1822
An Act to amend the Laws relating to the Land and Assessed Taxes, and to reflate the Appointment of Receivers General in England and Wales. (Repealed by Taxes Management Act 1880 (43 & 44 Vict. c. 19))
National Debt (No. 6) Act 1822 (repealed)	3 Geo. 4. c. 89	29 July 1822
An Act to provide for the Charge of the Addition to the Public Funded Debt of Great Britain, for the Service of the Year One thousand eight hundred and twenty two. (Repealed by Statute Law Revision Act 1870 (33 & 34 Vict. c. 69))
Exportation Act 1822 (repealed)	3 Geo. 4. c. 90	29 July 1822
An Act to revive and continue, until the Fifth Day of July One thousand eight hundred and twenty three, certain additional Bounties on the Exportation of certain Silk Manufactures of Great Britain and Ireland. (Repealed by Statute Law Revision Act 1873 (36 & 37 Vict. c. 91))
Royal Burghs (Scotland) Act 1822 (repealed)	3 Geo. 4. c. 91	29 July 1822
An Act for regulating the Mode of accounting for the Common Good and Revenues of the Royal Burghs of Scotland. (Repealed by Monument to Sir Walter Scott Act 1841 (4 & 5 Vict. c. 15) and Town Councils (Scotland) Act 1900 (63 & 64 Vict. c. 49))
Memorials of Grants of Annuities Act 1822 (repealed)	3 Geo. 4. c. 92	29 July 1822
An Act to explain an Act of the Fifty third Year of the Reign of His late Majesty, (Note: Inrolment of Grants of Annuities Act 1813 (53 Geo. 3. c. 141)) respecting the Enrolment of Memorials of Grants of Annuities. (Repealed by Usury Laws Repeal Act 1854 (17 & 18 Vict. c. 90))
National Debt (No. 7) Act 1822 (repealed)	3 Geo. 4. c. 93	30 July 1822
An Act for carrying into Execution an Agreement between His Majesty and the East India Company. (Repealed by Statute Law Revision Act 1870 (33 & 34 Vict. c. 69))
Duties on Malt, etc. (No. 2) Act 1822 (repealed)	3 Geo. 4. c. 94	30 July 1822
An Act to provide for the Collection and Payment of the Countervailing Duties and Drawbacks granted by an Act of this present Session (Note: Duties on Malt, etc. Act 1822 (3 Geo. 4. c. 31)) on Malt and other Articles imported and exported between Great Britain and Ireland. (Repealed by Statute Law Revision Act 1873 (36 & 37 Vict. c. 91))
Duties on Stage-coaches, etc. Act 1822 (repealed)	3 Geo. 4. c. 95	30 July 1822
An Act to reduce the Rate of Duties payable in respect of certain Carriages used and employed for the Purpose of conveying Passengers for Hire, and to make Regulations and Provisions relating to Stage Coaches and the Duties thereon. (Repealed by Stage Carriages Act 1832 (2 & 3 Will. 4. c. 120))
Duties in New South Wales Act 1822 (repealed)	3 Geo. 4. c. 96	30 July 1822
An Act to continue, until the First Day of January One thousand eight hundred and twenty four, an Act passed in the Fifty ninth Year of His late Majesty, (Note: Duties in New South Wales Act 1819 (59 Geo. 3. c. 114)) relating to imposing and levying Duties in New South Wales; to authorize the imposing and levying other Duties on Goods imported into the said Colony; and to suspend, for Ten Years, the Payment of Duty on the Importation of certain Goods the Produce of New South Wales. (Repealed by Statute Law Revision Act 1874 (37 & 38 Vict. c. 35))
Aliens (No. 2) Act 1822 (repealed)	3 Geo. 4. c. 97	30 July 1822
An Act to continue for Two Years an Act of the Fifty sixth Year of His late Majesty, (Note: Aliens Act 1816 (56 Geo. 3. c. 86)) for establishing Regulations respecting Aliens arriving in or resident in this Kingdom, in certain Cases. (Repealed by Statute Law Revision Act 1873 (36 & 37 Vict. c. 91))
Queen Caroline's Servants' Pension Act 1822 (repealed)	3 Geo. 4. c. 98	30 July 1822
An Act for enabling His Majesty to grant Pensions to the Servants of Her late Majesty Queen Caroline. (Repealed by Statute Law Revision Act 1874 (37 & 38 Vict. c. 35))
Customs Act 1822 (repealed)	3 Geo. 4. c. 99	30 July 1822
An Act to continue, until the Fifth Day of January One thousand eight hundred and twenty five, the Duties of Customs payable on British Salt imported into Ireland; to repeal the Duties on Foreign Salt imported into Ireland; and to grant other Duties in lieu thereof. (Repealed by Statute Law Revision Act 1873 (36 & 37 Vict. c. 91))
National Monument in Scotland Act 1822	3 Geo. 4. c. 100	30 July 1822
An Act to incorporate the Contributors for the Erection of a National Monument in Scotland to commemorate the Naval and Military Victory obtained during the late War.
Lotteries Act 1822 (repealed)	3 Geo. 4. c. 101	31 July 1822
An Act for granting to His Majesty a Sum of Money to be raised by Lotteries. (Repealed by Statute Law Revision Act 1861 (24 & 25 Vict. c. 101))
King's Bench (England) Act 1822 (repealed)	3 Geo. 4. c. 102	31 July 1822
An Act to repeal an Act of the First and Second Year of His present Majesty, (Note: (1 & 2 Geo. 4. c. 16))) for facilitating the Dispatch of Business in the Court of King's Bench; and to make further Provisions in lieu thereof. (Repealed by Law Terms Act 1830 (11 Geo. 4 & 1 Will. 4. c. 70))
Appointment of Constables, etc. (Ireland) Act 1822 (repealed)	3 Geo. 4. c. 103	5 August 1822
An Act for the Appointment of Constables, and to secure the effectual Performance of the Duties of their Office, and for the Appointment of Magistrates, in Ireland, in certain Cases. (Repealed by Constabulary (Ireland) Act 1836 (6 & 7 Will. 4. c. 13))
Bounty to Certain Vessels Act 1822 (repealed)	3 Geo. 4. c. 104	5 August 1822
An Act to continue, until the Thirty first Day of December One thousand eight hundred and twenty four, the Bounty to Vessels employed in the Greenland Seas and Davis's Streights; and to authorize His Majesty to alter the Times for the sailing of the said Vessels, and any of the Limitations contained in the Acts for allowing the said Bounty. (Repealed by Statute Law Revision Act 1873 (36 & 37 Vict. c. 91))
Postage Act 1822 (repealed)	3 Geo. 4. c. 105	5 August 1822
An Act for granting Rates of Postage for the Conveyance of Letters and Packets between the Port of Liverpool in the County of Lancaster and the Isle of Man. (Repealed by Post Office (Repeal of Laws) Act 1837 (7 Will. 4 & 1 Vict. c. 32))
Duties on Sugar Act 1822 (repealed)	3 Geo. 4. c. 106	5 August 1822
An Act to continue for One Year so much of an Act of the last Session of Parliament, (Note: Customs (No. 2) Act 1821 (1 & 2 Geo. 4. c. 106)) as increases the Duties payable on Sugar imported from the East Indies. (Repealed by Statute Law Revision Act 1873 (36 & 37 Vict. c. 91))
Duties on Brimstone Act 1822 (repealed)	3 Geo. 4. c. 107	5 August 1822
An Act to allow, until the First Day of August One thousand eight hundred and twenty three, a Drawback of the whole of the Duties of Customs on Brimstone used and consumed in the making and preparing Oil of Vitriol or Sulphuric Acid. (Repealed by Customs Law Repeal Act 1825 (6 Geo. 4. c. 105))
Property Occupied for Barrack Service Act 1822 (repealed)	3 Geo. 4. c. 108	5 August 1822
An Act for vesting all Estates and Property occupied for the Barrack Service, in any Part of the United Kingdom, in the Principal Officers of His Majesty's Ordnance, and for granting certain Powers to the said Principal Officers in relation thereto. (Repealed by Defence Act 1842 (5 & 6 Vict. c. 94))
Duties, etc., on Barilla Act 1822 (repealed)	3 Geo. 4. c. 109	5 August 1822
An Act to repeal the Duties and Drawbacks on Barilla imported into the United Kingdom; and to grant other Duties and Drawbacks in lieu thereof. (Repealed by Statute Law Revision Act 1861 (24 & 25 Vict. c. 101))
Smuggling Act 1822 (repealed)	3 Geo. 4. c. 110	5 August 1822
An Act to amend the Laws for the Prevention of Smuggling. (Repealed by Customs Law Repeal Act 1825 (6 Geo. 4. c. 105))
Exportation (No. 2) Act 1822 (repealed)	3 Geo. 4. c. 111	5 August 1822
An Act to allow, until the Tenth Day of November One thousand eight hundred and twenty four, the Exportation of Spirits distilled from Com for Home Consumption in Scotland, to Parts beyond Seas, without Payment of the Duty of Excise chargeable thereon. (Repealed by Statute Law Revision Act 1873 (36 & 37 Vict. c. 91))
Public Works Loans (Ireland) Act 1822 (repealed)	3 Geo. 4. c. 112	5 August 1822
An Act to authorise the further Advance of Money out of the Consolidated Fund, for the Completion of Works of a Public Nature, and for the Encouragement of the Fisheries in Ireland. (Repealed by Statute Law Revision Act 1873 (36 & 37 Vict. c. 91))
Public Salaries, etc. Act 1822 (repealed)	3 Geo. 4. c. 113	5 August 1822
An Act to amend an Act passed in the Fiftieth Year of His late Majesty, (Note: Public Salaries, etc. Act 1810 (50 Geo. 3. c. 117)) for directing that Accounts of Increase and Diminution of Public Salaries, Pensions and Allowances, shall be annually laid before Parliament, and for regulating and controlling the granting and paying such Salaries, Pensions and Allowances. (Repealed by Superannuation Act 1834 (4 & 5 Will. 4. c. 24))
Hard Labour Act 1822 (repealed)	3 Geo. 4. c. 114	5 August 1822
An Act to provide for the more effectual Punishment of certain Offences, by Imprisonment with hard Labour. (Repealed for England and Wales by Criminal Justice Act 1948 (11 & 12 Geo. 6. c. 58) and for Scotland by Criminal Justice (Scotland) Act 1949 (12, 13 & 14 Geo. 6. c. 94))
Office of Coroner (Ireland) Act 1822 (repealed)	3 Geo. 4. c. 115	5 August 1822
An Act to regulate the Qualification of Persons holding the Office of Coroner in Ireland. (Repealed by Coroners (Ireland) Act 1846 (9 & 10 Vict. c. 37))
Registry of Deeds (Ireland) Act 1822 (repealed)	3 Geo. 4. c. 116	5 August 1822
An Act for the more convenient and effectual registering in Ireland Deeds executed in Great Britain. (Repealed by Criminal Statutes Repeal Act 1861 (24 & 25 Vict. c. 95), Statute Law Revision Act 1887 (50 & 51 Vict. c. 59) and Statute Law Revision (No. 2) Act 1890 (53 & 54 Vict. c. 51), and for Northern Ireland by Perjury (Northern Ireland) Act 1946 (c. 13 (N.I.)) and Statute Law Revision Act (Northern Ireland) 1954 (c. 35 (N.I.)))
Stamps Act 1822 (repealed)	3 Geo. 4. c. 117	5 August 1822
An Act to reduce the Stamp Duties on Reconveyances of Mortgages, and in certain other Cases; and to amend an Act of the last Session of Parliament, (Note: Stamps Act 1821 (1 & 2 Geo. 4. c. 55)) for removing Doubts as to the Amount of certain Stamp Duties in Great Britain and Ireland respectively. (Repealed by Inland Revenue Repeal Act 1870 (33 & 34 Vict. c. 99))
Support of Commercial Credit (Ireland) (No. 2) Act 1822 (repealed)	3 Geo. 4. c. 118	5 August 1822
An Act to amend an Act made in this present Session of Parliament, (Note: Support of Commercial Credit (Ireland) Act 1822 (3 Geo. 4. c. 22)) for amending an Act made in the First Year of His present Majesty's Reign, for the Assistance of Trade and Manufactures in Ireland, by authorizing the Advance of certain Sums for the Support of Commercial Credit there. (Repealed by Statute Law Revision Act 1873 (36 & 37 Vict. c. 91))
British North America (Trade and Lands) Act 1822 (repealed)	3 Geo. 4. c. 119	5 August 1822
An Act to regulate the Trade of the Provinces of Lower and Upper Canada, and for other Purposes relating to the said Provinces. (Repealed by Customs Law Repeal Act 1825 (6 Geo. 4. c. 105))
Militia Pay Act 1822 (repealed)	3 Geo. 4. c. 120	5 August 1822
An Act to defray the Charge of the Pay, Clothing and Contingent Expences of the Disembodied Militia in Great Britain; and to grant Allowances in certain Cases to Subaltern Officers, Adjutants, Quartermasters, Surgeons, Surgeons' Mates, and Serjeant Majors of Militia, until the Twenty fifth Day of March One thousand eight hundred and twenty three. (Repealed by Statute Law Revision Act 1873 (36 & 37 Vict. c. 91))
Militia Pay (Ireland) Act 1822 (repealed)	3 Geo. 4. c. 121	5 August 1822
An Act to defray, until the Twenty fifth Day of June One, thousand eight hundred and twenty three, the Charge of the Pay and Clothing of the Militia of Ireland; and for making Allowances to Officers and Quartermasters of the said Militia during Peace. (Repealed by Statute Law Revision Act 1873 (36 & 37 Vict. c. 91))
Exchequer Bills (No. 2) Act 1822 (repealed)	3 Geo. 4. c. 122	5 August 1822
An Act for raising the Sum of Sixteen millions five hundred thousand Pounds by Exchequer Bills, for the Service of the Year One thousand eight hundred and twenty two. (Repealed by Statute Law Revision Act 1873 (36 & 37 Vict. c. 91))
Insolvent Debtors (England) Act 1822 (repealed)	3 Geo. 4. c. 123	6 August 1822
An Act to amend an Act of the First Year of His present Majesty, (Note: Relief of Insolvent Debtors Act 1820 (1 Geo. 4. c. 119)) for the Relief of Insolvent Debtors in England. (Repealed by Insolvent Debtors (England) Act 1826 (7 Geo. 4. c. 57))
Insolvent Debtors (Ireland) Act 1822 (repealed)	3 Geo. 4. c. 124	6 August 1822
An Act to amend an Act passed in the First and Second Years of His Majesty's Reign, (Note: Insolvent Debtors (Ireland) Act 1821 (1 & 2 Geo. 4. c. 59)) for the Relief of Insolvent Debtors in Ireland. (Repealed by Statute Law Revision Act 1873 (36 & 37 Vict. c. 91))
Leases of Tithes (Ireland) Act 1822 (repealed)	3 Geo. 4. c. 125	6 August 1822
An Act to enable Ecclesiastical Persons, and others, in Ireland, to grant Leases of Tithes, so as to bind their Successors. (Repealed by Statute Law Revision Act 1861 (24 & 25 Vict. c. 101))
Turnpike Roads Act 1822 or the General Turnpike Act 1822 (repealed)	3 Geo. 4. c. 126	6 August 1822
An Act to amend the general Laws now in being for regulating Turnpike Roads in that Part of Great Britain called England. (Repealed by Statute Law (Repeals) Act 1981 (c. 19))
Appropriation Act 1822 (repealed)	3 Geo. 4. c. 127	6 August 1822
An Act for applying certain Monies therein mentioned for the Service of the Year One thousand eight hundred and twenty two, and for further appropriating the Supplies granted in this Session of Parliament. (Repealed by Statute Law Revision Act 1873 (36 & 37 Vict. c. 91))

=== Local acts ===
Short title	Citation	Royal assent
Long title
Wich Tree Bridge Act 1822 (repealed)	3 Geo. 4. c. i	21 March 1822
An Act for continuing the Term and altering and enlarging the Powers of Two Acts (Note: Wychtree Bridge Act 1778 (18 Geo. 3. c. 68)) (Note: Wychtree Bridge Act 1800 (39 & 40 Geo. 3. c. xli)) passed for building a Bridge across the River Tawey, (Note: Wychtree Bridge, Morriston, demolished in 1959; on the route of the A48 road. Designed by William Edwards.) at a Place called The Wich Tree, in the Parish of Llansamlett, to the opposite Shore in the Parish of Llangevelach in the County of Glamorgan; and for making proper Avenues or Roads to and from the said Bridge; and for repairing the Road from Pentre Brook, and for repairing the Road from Pentre Brook, near a Place called Aberdwyberthy, in the Parish of Saint John's, near Swansea, to the said Bridge. (Repealed by Turnpike Trusts in South Wales Act 1844 (7 & 8 Vict. c. 91))
Roads leading to and from Chepstow Act 1822	3 Geo. 4. c. ii	21 March 1822
An Act for repairing and maintaining certain Roads leading to and from Chepstow, and other Places in the Counties of Monmouth and Gloucester, called The District of Chepstow and The New Passage District.
Wigan and Preston Roads Act 1822	3 Geo. 4. c. iii	3 April 1822
An Act for more effectively repairing, widening, amending and improving the Roads from Wigan to Preston, in the County Palatine of Lancaster.
Norfolk County Gaol Act 1822 (repealed)	3 Geo. 4. c. iv	3 April 1822
An Act to enable His Majesty's Justices of the Peace, acting for the County of Norfolk, to build an additional Gaol, House of Correction and Shire House for the said County, and for other Purposes relating thereto. (Repealed by Statute Law (Repeals) Act 2008 (c. 12))
Deritend Bridge Act 1822	3 Geo. 4. c. v	3 April 1822
An Act for enlarging the Powers of Two Acts of His late Majesty King George the Third, (Note: Deritend Bridge, Birmingham Rebuilding Act 1788 (28 Geo. 3. c. 70)) (Note: Deritend Bridge Act 1813 (54 Geo. 3. c. xiii)) for rebuilding the Bridge over the River Rea, at the Town of Birmingham, called Deritend Bridge; and for widening the Avenues thereto, and making certain other Improvements.
Bradford Gas Act 1822 (repealed)	3 Geo. 4. c. vi	3 April 1822
An Act for lighting with Gas the Town of Bradford, and the Neighbourhood thereof, within the Parish of Bradford, in the West Riding of the County of York. (Repealed by West Yorkshire Act 1980 (c. xiv))
Wakefield Gas Act 1822 (repealed)	3 Geo. 4. c. vii	3 April 1822
An Act for lighting with Gas the Town and Neighbourhood of Wakefield in the West Riding of the County of York. (Repealed by Wakefield Gas Act 1847 (10 & 11 Vict. c. cxcix))
Stockport and Marple Bridge Road Act 1822 (repealed)	3 Geo. 4. c. viii	3 April 1822
An Act for more effectually repairing and improving the Road from the Old Bridge in the Town of Stockport in the County Palatine of Chester, to or near Marple Bridge in the said County; and a Branch from the said Road, near Marple Bridge aforesaid, to or near Thornset Gate in the County of Derby. (Repealed by Stockport and Marple Roads Act 1852 (15 & 16 Vict. c. lxxxv))
Roads from Donington High Bridge Act 1822 (repealed)	3 Geo. 4. c. ix	3 April 1822
An Act for repairing and amending the Roads from Donington High Bridge to Hale Drove, and to the Eighth Mile Stone in the Parish of Wigtoft, and to Langret Ferry in the County of Lincoln. (Repealed by Donington (Lincolnshire) Turnpike Roads Act 1856 (19 & 20 Vict. c. lxxiii))
Roads in Nottinghamshire and Derbyshire Act 1822 (repealed)	3 Geo. 4. c. x	3 April 1822
An Act for continuing the Term, and altering, amending and en larging the Powers of several Acts (Note: Notts and Derby Roads Act 1758 (32 Geo. 2. c. 38)) (Note: Derby and Nottinghamshire Roads Act 1780 (20 Geo. 3. c. 74)) (Note: Nottingham, Oakerthorpe and Wirksworth Roads Act 1800 (39 & 40 Geo. 3. c. xlv)) passed for repairing the Roads from Chappel Bar, near the West End of the Town of Nottingham, to Nwwhaven; and from the Four Lane Ends, near Oaker (Repealed by Nottingham and Newhaven Turnpike Road Act 1855 (18 & 19 Vict. c. xcii))
Road from Chester to Newport (Salop.) Act 1822	3 Geo. 4. c. xi	3 April 1822
An Act for continuing the Term, and altering, amending and enlarging the Powers of the several Acts (Note: Chester to Birmingham Road Act 1759 (33 Geo. 2. c. 51)) (Note: Chester and Whitchurch Roads Act 1778 (18 Geo. 3. c. 86)) (Note: Chester and Whitchurch Road Act 1802 (42 Geo. 3. c. lxi)) passed for repairing the Road from the Bars at Boughton, within the Liberties of the City of Chester, to Whitchurch, and from thence to Newport in the County of Salop, and other Roads in the said Acts mentioned, so far as relate to the First District of Roads in the said Acts mentioned; and for diverting a certain Part of the Road comprised within the said District.
Road from Nether Bridge and from Millthrop (Westmorland) Act 1822 (repealed)	3 Geo. 4. c. xii	3 April 1822
An Act for more effectually repairing the Roads from Nether Bridge to Leven's Bridge, and from thence through the Town of Millthrop to Dixes; and from the Town of Millthrop to Hanbridge, and from thence to join the Heronsyke Turnpike Road, near Clawthrop Hall in the County of Westmorland. (Repealed by Millthrop and Levens Turnpike Road Act 1851 (14 & 15 Vict. c. xvii))
Brighton and Shoreham Bridge Road Act 1822 (repealed)	3 Geo. 4. c. xiii	15 May 1822
An Act for making and maintaining a Road from Brighton to Shoreham Bridge in the County of Sussex. (Repealed by Brighton, Shoreham and Lancing Road and New Shoreham Bridge Act 1830 (11 Geo. 4 & 1 Will. 4. c. lxiii))
Chorlton Row Improvement Act 1822 (repealed)	3 Geo. 4. c. xiv	15 May 1822
An Act for lighting and watching, and for regulating the Police within the Township of Chorlton Row, in the County of Lancaster. (Repealed by Chorlton-upon-Medlock Improvement Act 1832 (2 & 3 Will. 4. c. xc))
Dover Gas Act 1822 (repealed)	3 Geo. 4. c. xv	15 May 1822
An Act for lighting the Town and Port of Dovor, and Places adjacent, in the County of Kent, with Gas. (Repealed by Dovor Gasworks Act 1860 (23 & 24 Vict. c. lxxxiv))
Ryeway and Presteigne Roads Act 1822	3 Geo. 4. c. xvi	15 May 1822
An Act for continuing the Term and altering the Powers of Three Acts, (Note: Presteigne Road Act 1756 (29 Geo. 2. c. 94)) (Note: Hereford, Radnor and Salop Roads Act 1778 (18 Geo. 3. c. 111)) (Note: Radnor, Hereford and Salop. Roads Act 1800 (39 & 40 Geo. 3. c. lxviii)) for repairing the Roads leading from the Ryeway in the Parish of Yarpole in the County of Hereford, to Presteigne in the County of Radnor, and several other Roads therein mentioned in the said County of Radnor, and in the Counties of Hereford and Salop.
Inchbelly Bridge and Glasgow Road Act 1822	3 Geo. 4. c. xvii	15 May 1822
An Act for altering and enlarging the Terms and Powers of certain Acts, (Note: Glasgow Roads Act 1754 (27 Geo. 2. c. 27)) (Note: Glasgow Roads Act 1766 (6 Geo. 3. c. 82)) (Note: Glasgow Roads Act 1795 (35 Geo. 3. c. 155)) (Note: Road from Inchbelly Bridge to Glasgow Act 1801 (41 Geo. 3. (U.K.) c. xxv)) so far as the same relate to the Roads from Inchbelly Bridge to Glasgow, and leading over Garngad Hill to Provan Mill, and other Roads branching therefrom or connected therewith.
East India Company and the Nabobs of the Carnatic Act 1822 (repealed)	3 Geo. 4. c. xviii	15 May 1822
An Act for further continuing, until the First Day of August One thousand eight hundred and twenty five, and from thence to the End of the then next Session of Parliament, the Powers granted by an Act of the Forty sixth Year of His late Majesty, (Note: East India Company and the Nabobs of the Carnatic Act 1806 (46 Geo. 3. c. cxxxiii)) for enabling the Commissioners acting in Execution of an Agreement made between the East India Company and the private Creditors of the Nabobs of the Carnatic, the better to carry the same into effect. (Repealed by Statute Law (Repeals) Act 2008 (c. 12))
St. Luke's Church and St. Thomas's Church, Liverpool Act 1822 (repealed)	3 Geo. 4. c. xix	15 May 1822
An Act for erecting and endowing a Church in the Town of Liverpool in the County Palatine of Lancaster, to be called Saint Luke's Church; and for reviving and amending an Act of the Twenty first Year of King George the Second, (Note: Liverpool Improvement Act 1747 (21 Geo. 2. c. 24)) so far as relates to Saint Thomas's Church. (Repealed by Liverpool and Wigan Churches Act 1904 (4 Edw. 7. c. c))
Great Yarmouth Parish Church Act 1822	3 Geo. 4. c. xx	15 May 1822
An Act for altering and enlarging the Powers of an Act made in the Forty sixth Year of King George the Third, (Note: Great Yarmouth Parish Church Act 1806 (46 Geo. 3. c. lxi)) for repairing the Parish Church of Great Yarmouth, in the County of Norfolk, and rebuilding the Tower thereof.
Bristol Dock Company Act 1822 (repealed)	3 Geo. 4. c. xxi	15 May 1822
An Act to alter, amend and explain the several Acts passed for improving and rendering more commodious the Port and Harbour of Bristol. (Repealed by Bristol Dock Company Act 1848 (11 & 12 Vict. c. xliii))
Scarborough Harbour Act 1822	3 Geo. 4. c. xxii	15 May 1822
An Act for further continuing the Duties and altering the Powers granted by Six several Acts of their late Majesties King George the Second (Note: Scarborough Harbour Act 1731 (5 Geo. 2. c. 11)) (Note: Scarborough Harbour Act 1751 (25 Geo. 2. c. 44)) and King George the Third, (Note: Scarborough Pier Act 1763 (3 Geo. 3. c. 42)) (Note: Scarborough Pier Act 1778 (18 Geo. 3. c. 20)) (Note: Scarborough Harbour Act 1801 (41 Geo. 3. (U.K.) c. lxix)) (Note: Scarborough Harbour Act 1806 (46 Geo. 3. c. xxxiii)) for enlarging the Piers and Harbour of Scarborough in the County of York.
Berks and Wilts Drainage Act 1822	3 Geo. 4. c. xxiii	15 May 1822
An Act to amend an Act for draining and improving Lands in the Parishes of Bray, White Waltham, Shottesbrook, Lawrence Waltham, Binfield Ruscomb, Wargrave, Remenham and Hurley, in the County of Berks, and the Liberties of Whistley and Broad Hinton, in the Parish of Hurst, in the Counties of Berks and Wilts.
Bristol Improvement Act 1822 (repealed)	3 Geo. 4. c. xxiv	15 May 1822
An Act for the Employment, Maintenance and Regulation of the Poor of the City of Bristol; and for altering the Mode of assessing the Rates for the Relief of the Poor, and certain Rates authorized to be raised and levied within the said City by certain Acts (Note: Bristol Workhouse Act 1695 (7 & 8 Will. 3. c. 32 Pr.)) (Note: Tiverton Workhouse Act 1697 (9 Will. 3. c. 18 Pr.)) (Note: Bristol (Poor Relief) Act 1713 (13 Ann. c. 32)) (Note: Bristol Hospitals and Workhouses Act 1717 (4 Geo. 1. c. 3 Pr.)) (Note: Bristol Hospitals Act 1744 (18 Geo. 2. c. 38)) (Note: Bristol Harbour Act 1803 (43 Geo. 3. c. cxl)) (Note: Bristol (Poor Relief) Act 1757 (31 Geo. 2. c. 56)) (Note: Bristol Improvement Act 1806 (46 Geo. 3. c. xxvi)) (Note: Bristol Harbour Act 1806 (46 Geo. 3. c. xxxv)) for improving the Harbour there, and for paving, pitching, cleansing and lighting the same City; and for the Relief of the Churchwardens and Overseers from the collecting of such Rates; and for amending the Act for paving, pitching, cleansing and lighting the said City. (Repealed by Bristol Corporation Act 1897 (60 & 61 Vict. c. ccxxx))
Barnsley Improvement Act 1822 (repealed)	3 Geo. 4. c. xxv	15 May 1822
An Act for lighting, paving, cleansing, watching, and improving the Town of Barnsley in the West Riding of the County of York. (Repealed by Statute Law (Repeals) Act 1989 (c. 43))
Durham and Framwelgate Improvement Act 1822	3 Geo. 4. c. xxvi	15 May 1822
An Act to amend the Powers and Provisions of an Act of His late Majesty, (Note: Durham Streets Act 1790 (30 Geo. 3. c. 67)) for paving, cleansing, lighting, watching and regulating the Streets and other Public Places within the City of Durham and Borough of Framwelgate and Suburbs thereof, and Streets thereto adjoining, and other Purposes relating thereto.
Alnwick Improvement Act 1822	3 Geo. 4. c. xxvii	15 May 1822
An Act for lighting, paving, cleansing, watching and otherwise improving the Town of Alnwick, in the County of Northumberland.
Queen Street Gardens, Edinburgh, Improvement Act 1822	3 Geo. 4. c. xxviii	15 May 1822
An Act for regulating, maintaining and improving the Premises in the City of Edinburgh, termed Queen Street Gardens, and for effecting certain other Improvements in the Vicinity thereof, and connected therewith.
Warwick Gas Act 1822 (repealed)	3 Geo. 4. c. xxix	15 May 1822
An Act for incorporating the Warwick Gas Light Company. (Repealed by Warwick Gas Act 1915 (5 & 6 Geo. 5. c. xliii))
Halifax Gas Act 1822 (repealed)	3 Geo. 4. c. xxx	15 May 1822
An Act for lighting with Gas the Town and Township of Halifax, and the Neighbourhood thereof, within the Parish of Halifax, in the West Riding of the County of York. (Repealed by West Yorkshire Act 1980 (c. xiv))
Wigan Gas Act 1822 (repealed)	3 Geo. 4. c. xxxi	15 May 1822
An Act for lighting with Gas the Town and Borough of Wigan in the County Palatine of Lancaster. (Repealed by Wigan Gas Act 1861 (24 & 25 Vict. c. clxx))
Leith Gas Act 1822 (repealed)	3 Geo. 4. c. xxxii	15 May 1822
An Act for lighting the Town of Leith and its Vicinity with Gas, and other Purposes relating thereto. (Repealed by Edinburgh Corporation Order Confirmation Act 1932 (22 & 23 Geo. 5. c. vii))
Stockton Gas Act 1822 (repealed)	3 Geo. 4. c. xxxiii	15 May 1822
An Act for lighting with Gas the Town and Borough of Stockton, in the County of Durham. (Repealed by Stockton New Gas Company Act 1846 (9 & 10 Vict. c. ccxvi))
Canterbury Gas Act 1822 (repealed)	3 Geo. 4. c. xxxiv	15 May 1822
An Act for better supplying the City of Canterbury and the several Streets and Roads adjoining thereto with Gas. (Repealed by Canterbury Gas and Water Act 1866 (29 & 30 Vict. c. xcix))
Warrington Gas Act 1822 (repealed)	3 Geo. 4. c. xxxv	15 May 1822
An Act for incorporating the Warrington Gas Light Company. (Repealed by Warrington Gas Act 1847 (10 & 11 Vict. c. xliv))
Culham, Abingdon and Fyfield Roads Act 1822 (repealed)	3 Geo. 4. c. xxxvi	15 May 1822
An Act for repairing and maintaining the Roads leading from the End of Culham Bridge next to Culham, in the County of Oxford, to the End of Burford Bridge next to Abingdon in the County of Berks; and from the Mayor's Stone at the End of Boar 4Street in the Town of Abingdon, to the West End of the Town of Fyfield in the same County. (Repealed by Statute Law (Repeals) Act 2013 (c. 2))
Road from Mansfield to Worksop Brecks Act 1822 (repealed)	3 Geo. 4. c. xxxvii	15 May 1822
An Act for amending, widening, altering and keeping in Repair the Road from the upper Part of Leeming Lane, in the Town of Mansfield, opposite to the End of Bath Lane, to the Turnpike Road leading from Worksop to Kelham, at or near the Corner of Worksop Brecks, all in the County of Nottingham. (Repealed by Mansfield and Worksop Road Act 1857 (20 & 21 Vict. c. xliv))
Worksop and West Retford Road Act 1822	3 Geo. 4. c. xxxviii	15 May 1822
An Act for amending, widening, altering and keeping in Repair the Road from the Eastern End of Potter Street, in the Town of Worksop, to the Bridge over the Chesterfield Canal, leading into the Town of West Retford in the County of Nottingham.
Canterbury and Ramsgate Road Act 1822	3 Geo. 4. c. xxxix	15 May 1822
An Act for continuing the Term, and altering and enlarging the Powers of an Act of the Forty second Year of the Reign of His late Majesty King George the Third, (Note: Road from Canterbury to Ramsgate Act 1802 (42 Geo. 3. c. v)) for repairing and improving the Road leading from the City of Canterbury to the Town of Ramsgate in the County of Kent; and for suspending and varying for a further limited Time so much of an Act passed in the Twenty seventh Year of the Reign of His said late Majesty, (Note: Canterbury (Streets) Act 1787 (27 Geo. 3. c. 14)) as relates to the Toll Grate and to the Tolls payable by virtue of the said Act, on the Road leading from the said City of Canterbury to the Isle of Thanet in the said County of Kent; and for altering the Line of certain Parts of the said Road.
Road from Canterbury to Sandwich Act 1822	3 Geo. 4. c. xl	15 May 1822
An Act for continuing the Term and altering and enlarging the Powers of an Act of the Forty second Year of the Reign of His late Majesty King George the Third, (Note: Road from Canterbury to Sandwich Act 1802 (42 Geo. 3. c. vi)) for repairing and improving the Road from the City of Canterbury to the Town and Port of Sandwich in the County of Kent.
Ruthin and Mold Roads Act 1822	3 Geo. 4. c. xli	15 May 1822
An Act for continuing the Term, and altering, amending and enlarging the Powers of several Acts, (Note: Denbigh and Carnarvon Roads Act 1757 (30 Geo. 2. c. 69)) (Note: Denbigh, Flint and Carnarvon Roads Act 1779 (19 Geo. 3. c. 109)) (Note: Ruthin and Mold Roads Act 1800 (39 & 40 Geo. 3. c. lxvi)) for repairing the Roads therein mentioned, in the Counties of Denbigh and Flint, so far as relate to the Road from Ruthin in the County of Denbigh to Mold in the County of Flint.
Roads from Shrewsbury and from Shelton Act 1822	3 Geo. 4. c. xlii	15 May 1822
An Act for more effectually repairing several Roads leading from the Town of Shrewsbury, and from Shelton, in the County of Salop, to Minsterley, Westbury and Baschurch, in the said County of Salop, and to or near to Buttington Hall, in the County of Montgomery; and for repealing Three Acts, severally passed in the Thirty first Year of King George the Second, (Note: Shrewsbury, etc. Roads Act 1757 (31 Geo. 2. c. 67)) and the Twelfth (Note: Shrewsbury Roads Act 1772 (12 Geo. 3. c. 77)) and Forty first (Note: Shrewsbury Roads Act 1801 (41 Geo. 3. (U.K.) c. lxxxviii)) Years of His late Majesty, relative thereto.
Wrexham to Denbigh and Ruthin to Cerniogemawr Roads Act 1822	3 Geo. 4. c. xliii	15 May 1822
An Act for continuing the Term and enlarging the Powers of several Acts (Note: Denbigh, Flint and Carnarvon Roads Act 1758 (32 Geo. 2. c. 55)) (Note: Denbigh Flint and Carnarvon Roads Act 1780 (20 Geo. 3. c. 97)) (Note: Wrexham, Ruthin, Denbigh and Cerniogau-Mawr Roads Act 1801 (41 Geo. 3. (U.K.) c. xciii)) passed for repairing the Roads therein mentioned, in the Counties of Denbigh, Flint and Carnarvon, so far as relate to the Road from Wrexham to Denbigh, in the County of Denbigh, and for amending the Road from Ruthin to Cerniogemawr, in the Parish of Llanufydd, in the County of Denbigh.
Road from Harlow Act 1822 (repealed)	3 Geo. 4. c. xliv	15 May 1822
An Act for the more effectually repairing the Road from Harlow Bush Common, in the Parish of Harlow, to Woodford in the County of Essex, and the Road from Epping, through theParishes of Northweald, Basset, Bobbingworth, High Ongar, Chipping Ongar and Shelley, to the Four Want Way in the Parish of Shelley, and from thence through the Parishes of High Ongar and Norton Mandeville, to the Parish of Writtle in the said County. (Repealed by Road from Harlow Bush Common Act 1836 (6 & 7 Will. 4. c. xlix))
Edinburgh and Leith Roads Act 1822	3 Geo. 4. c. xlv	15 May 1822
An Act for more effectually repairing and maintaining the District of Roads in the County of Edinburgh, termed The Leith Walk District, and for other other Purposes relating thereto; and for altering and increasing the Conversions and defining the Bounds of the Middle District of Roads in the said County.
Road from Leicester to Uppingham and Peterborough Act 1822 (repealed)	3 Geo. 4. c. xlvi	15 May 1822
An Act for continuing the Term, and altering, amending and enlarging the Powers of an Act of His late Majesty's Reign, (Note: Road from Leicester to Peterborough Act 1801 (41 Geo. 3. (U.K.) c. cxviii)) for repairing the Road from the Borough of Leicester in the County of Leicester, to the Town of Uppingham in the County of Rutland, and to Wansford and Peterborough, both in the County of Northampton. (Repealed by Leicester and Peterborough Road Act 1843 (6 & 7 Vict. c. xcvi))
Burford and Dancy's Fancy Road Act 1822 (repealed)	3 Geo. 4. c. xlvii	15 May 1822
An Act to enlarge the Term and Powers of several Acts (Note: Oxford and Gloucester Roads Act 1753 (26 Geo. 2. c. 70)) (Note: Burford to Preston Road Act 1780 (20 Geo. 3. c. 76)) (Note: Road from Burford to Dancy's Fancy Act 1801 (41 Geo. 3. (U.K.) c. xvi)) passed for repairing and widening the Road from The Hand and Post in Upton Field in the Parish of Burford in the County of Oxford, to a Place in the Parish of Preston, in the County of Gloucester, called Dancy's Fancy. (Repealed by Statute Law (Repeals) Act 2013 (c. 2))
Span Smithy, Winsford Bridge and Northwich Roads Act 1822	3 Geo. 4. c. xlviii	15 May 1822
An Act for more effectually repairing and widening the Roads from Spann Smithy, through Middlewich, and by Spittle Hill in Stanthorn, to Winsford Bridge, and from Spittle Hill to Northwich, in the County Palatine of Chester.
Roads from Bishop's Castle, Montgomery and Brockton Act 1822	3 Geo. 4. c. xlix	15 May 1822
An Act for more effectually repairing and improving the Roads 8. leading from Bishops Castle, and from Montgomery, to the Road at Westbury, and from Brockton to the Road at Minsterley, and other Roads therein mentioned, in the Counties of Salop, Radnor and Montgomery; and for amending, widening and improving several other Roads therein mentioned, in the said County of Salop.
Broughton and Mold Roads Act 1822	3 Geo. 4. c. l	15 May 1822
An Act for more effectually repairing the Road from the North End of a Lane called Rosemary Lane in the Township of Broughton, to the Town of Mold in the County of Flint, and for diverting a Part of the said Road, and for making a new Branch of Road to communicate with the said Road.
Plymouth and Stonehouse Bridge Roads Act 1822 (repealed)	3 Geo. 4. c. li	15 May 1822
An Act to alter and enlarge the Term and Powers of an Act of His late Majesty, (Note: Plymouth and Stonehouse Bridge Roads Act 1805 (45 Geo. 3. c. xxxiv)) for the making, repairing, lighting, watching and watering certain Roads, leading from the Borough of Plymouth to Stonehouse Bridge and Plymouth Dock in the County of Devon; and for regulating the Stands and Fares of Hackney Coaches and Carts using the same. (Repealed by Plymouth and Stonehouse Roads and Transport Act 1843 (6 & 7 Vict. c. lxi))
Road from Reading to Basingstoke Act 1822	3 Geo. 4. c. lii	24 May 1822
An Act for more effectually makings repairing and improving the Road leading from Reading in the County of Berks, to Basingstoke in the County of Southampton.
Gloucester and Berkeley Canal Act 1822	3 Geo. 4. c. liii	24 May 1822
An Act for enabling the Gloucester and Berkeley Canal Company to raise a further Sum of Money to discharge their Debts, and to complete said Canal, and for amending the several Acts (Note: Gloucester and Berkeley Canal Act 1793 (33 Geo. 3. c. 97)) (Note: Gloucester and Berkeley Canal Act 1797 (37 Geo. 3. c. 54)) (Note: Gloucester and Berkeley Canal Act 1805 (45 Geo. 3. c. civ)) (Note: Gloucester and Berkeley Canal Act 1818 (58 Geo. 3. c. xvii)) passed for making the said Canal.
Lanark and Glasgow Bridewell Act 1822	3 Geo. 4. c. liv	24 May 1822
An Act for erecting a Bridewell for the County of Lanark and City of Glasgow.
Newcastle-upon-Tyne Gaol Act 1822 (repealed)	3 Geo. 4. c. lv	24 May 1822
An Act for building a new Gaol and a new House of Correction in and for the Town and County of Newcastle-upon-Tyne; and for other Purposes relating thereto. (Repealed by Statute Law (Repeals) Act 2008 (c. 12))
Newcastle-upon-Tyne Tolls Act 1822 (repealed)	3 Geo. 4. c. lvi	24 May 1822
An Act for facilitating the Collection of certain Tolls payable to the Mayor and Burgess of Newcastle-upon-Tyne. (Repealed by Tyne & Wear Act 1980 (c. xliii))
Bognor Market and Roads Act 1822 (repealed)	3 Geo. 4. c. lvii	24 May 1822
An Act to establish a Market for the Sale of Butcher's Meat and other Articles, and to repair and amend certain Roads in the Town or Tithing of Bognor in the County of Sussex. (Repealed by Ministry of Health Provisional Orders Confirmation (No. 8) Act 1924 (14 & 15 Geo. 5. c. lxxiv))
Rochdale Markets Act 1822	3 Geo. 4. c. lviii	24 May 1822
An Act for providing an additional Market Place in and for the Town of Rochdale in the County Palatine of Lancaster.
Chelmsford and Moulsham Improvement Act 1822 (repealed)	3 Geo. 4. c. lix	24 May 1822
An Act for altering and enlarging the Powers of an Act of His late Majesty King George the Third, (Note: Chelmsford Improvement Act 1789 (29 Geo. 3. c. 44)) for paving the Footways, and for cleansing, lighting and watching the Town of Chelmsford and Hamlet of Moulsham, in the Parish of Chelmsford in the County of Essex. (Repealed by Essex Act 1987 (c. xx))
Tiverton Improvement Act 1822	3 Geo. 4. c. lx	24 May 1822
An Act for amending and enlarging the Powers and Provisions of an Act of His late Majesty King George the Third, intituled "An Act for paving and otherwise improving the Town of Tiverton in the County of Devon," (Note: Tiverton Improvement Act 1794 (34 Geo. 3. c. 52)) and for lighting the said Town.
Gloucestershire Roads Act 1822 (repealed)	3 Geo. 4. c. lxi	24 May 1822
An Act for amending and improving the Roads leading from Tiltup's Inn in the Parish of Horsley, to or near Dudbridge in the Parish of Rodborough, and from the Bridge at Nailsworth to The Cross Post on Minchinhampton Common, and other Roads thereto adjoining; and for making a new Piece of Road from the said Bridge to The Cross in the Parish of Avening, all in the County of Gloucester. (Repealed by Statute Law (Repeals) Act 2013 (c. 2))
Donhead St. Andrew and Nether Compton Road Act 1822	3 Geo. 4. c. lxii	24 May 1822
An Act for amending and keeping in repair the Road from the Turnpike Gate at the Bottom of White Street Hill, in the Parish of Donhead Saint Andrew, in the County of Wilts, through the Towns of Shaftesbury, Milborne Port, and Sherborne, in the Counties of Dorset and Somerset, to the Halfway House in the Parish of Nether, otherwise Lower Compton, in the said County of Dorset, and several other Roads communicating therewith.
Tetbury Roads Act 1822 (repealed)	3 Geo. 4. c. lxiii	24 May 1822
An Act to enlarge the Term and Powers of several Acts, (Note: Gloucestershire Roads (No. 3) Act 1757 (31 Geo. 2. c. 65)) (Note: Gloucester Roads Act 1780 (20 Geo. 3. c. 70)) (Note: Tetbury Roads Act 1801 (41 Geo. 3. (U.K.) c. lxxxv)) for repairing and widening the Road from the Market House in Tetbury, to the Turnpike Road on Minchinhampton Common, and several other Roads therein mentioned, all in the County of Gloucester, so far as the same Acts relate to the Second District of Roads therein mentioned. (Repealed by Statute Law (Repeals) Act 2013 (c. 2))
Road from Whitchurch (Salop.) to Ternhill Act 1822	3 Geo. 4. c. lxiv	24 May 1822
An Act for amending and maintaining the Road from Whitchurch to Ternhill, in the County of Salop.
Bridgwater (Somerset) Roads Act 1822	3 Geo. 4. c. lxv	24 May 1822
An Act to repeal several Acts (Note: Somerset and Gloucester Roads Act 1758 (32 Geo. 2. c. 40)) (Note: Bridgwater Roads Act 1779 (19 Geo. 3. c. 100)) (Note: Roads to Bridgwater Act 1801 (41 Geo. 3. (U.K.) c. xii)) passed for repairing several Roads leading to the Town of Bridgwater in the County of Somerset, and several other Roads therein mentioned, so far as the said Acts relate to the Roads leading to the said Town, and to consolidate and comprise the same in One Act of Parliament.
Lincoln Heath and Peterborough and Bourn and Spalding Roads Act 1822 (repealed)	3 Geo. 4. c. lxvi	24 May 1822
An Act for more effectually improving the Roads leading from the East Side of Lincoln Heath to the City o£ Peterborough, and several other Roads therein mentioned, in the Counties of Northampton and Lincoln; and for making a new Branch of Road to communicate with the said Roads, from Bourn to Spalding, in the said County of Lincoln. (Repealed by Lincoln Heath and Market Deeping Roads Act 1860 (23 & 24 Vict. c. xli))
Guildford to Farnham Road Act 1822 (repealed)	3 Geo. 4. c. lxvii	24 May 1822
An Act for enlarging the Term and Powers of several Acts (Note: Guildford to Farnham Road Act 1757 (31 Geo. 2. c. 78)) (Note: Guildford to Farnham Road Act 1780 (20 Geo. 3. c. 96)) (Note: Guildford to Farnham Road Act 1801 (41 Geo. 3. (U.K.) c. xliii)) passed for repairing the Road from the Town of Guldeford to the Directing Post near the Town of Farnham in the County of Surrey. (Repealed by Statute Law (Repeals) Act 2013 (c. 2))
Royston and Wandesford Bridge Road Act 1822	3 Geo. 4. c. lxviii	24 May 1822
An Act for more effectually repairing the South District of the Road from Royston in the County of Hertford, to Wandesford Bridge in the County of Huntingdon.
Evesham Roads Act 1822	3 Geo. 4. c. lxix	24 May 1822
An Act for repairing and amending several Roads leading to and from the Borough of Evesham in the County of Worcester, and several other Roads in the Counties of Worcester and Gloucester.
Road from Dartford to Strood Act 1822	3 Geo. 4. c. lxx	24 May 1822
An Act for repairing, widening and maintaining the Road leading from Dartford to and through Northfleet and Gravesend, and thence to the Stones End, near the Parish Church of Strood in the County of Kent.
St. Mary's Church, Greenwich Act 1822	3 Geo. 4. c. lxxi	24 June 1822
An Act for erecting a new Church in the Parish of Greenwich in the County of Kent, and vesting the same and the Scite thereof in Trustees, and for making Provisions respecting the same.
Coventry Gaol Act 1822 (repealed)	3 Geo. 4. c. lxxii	24 June 1822
An Act for building a new Gaol and House of Correction for the City and County of the City of Coventry. (Repealed by West Midlands Act 1980 (c. xi))
Haverfordwest Gaol and Lunatic Asylum Act 1822 (repealed)	3 Geo. 4. c. lxxiii	24 June 1822
An Act for converting the Gaol and House of Correction of the County of Pembroke into a Gaol for the said County, and for the Town and County of the Town of Haverfordwest; and for applying the Gaol of the said Town and County of the Town of Haverfordwest to the Purposes of a Lunatic Asylum. (Repealed by Dyfed Act 1987 (c. xxiv))
Lincolnshire County Offices Act 1822 (repealed)	3 Geo. 4. c. lxxiv	24 June 1822
An Act io enable the Justices of the Peace for the Divisions of Lindsey, Kesteven and Holland, in the County of Lincoln, to lake down the present County Hall for the said County, and to erect a convenient Hall instead thereof, with suitable Offices and other Aoeommodations. (Repealed by Statute Law (Repeals) Act 2013 (c. 2))
Severn and Wye Railway and Canal Act 1822	3 Geo. 4. c. lxxv	24 June 1822
An Act to amend Two Acts of the Forty ninth (Note: Lydney and Lidbrook Railway Act 1809 (49 Geo. 3. c. clix)) and Fiftieth (Note: Severn and Wye Railway and Canal Act 1810 (50 Geo. 3. c. ccxv)) Years of His late Majesty, for making the Severn and Wye Railway and Canal.
Tay Ferries Act 1822 (repealed)	3 Geo. 4. c. lxxvi	24 June 1822
An Act to alter, amend and enlarge the Term and Powers of an Act passed in the Fifty ninth Year of His late Majesty, (Note: Tay Ferries Act 1819 (59 Geo. 3. c. cxiii)) for erecting and maintaining Ferries across the River Tay in the Counties of Fife and Forfar. (Repealed by Dundee Harbour and Tay Ferries Act 1873 (36 & 37 Vict. c. l))
Liverpool Water Act 1822 (repealed)	3 Geo. 4. c. lxxvii	24 June 1822
An Act to repeal so much of an Act of the Twenty-sixth Year of His late Majesty (Note: Liverpool Improvement Act 1786 (26 Geo. 3. c. 12)) as relates to the supplying the Town of Liverpool, in the County Palatine of Lancaster, with Water, and to grant other Powers for supplying the said Town and Port, and the Shipping resorting thereto, with Water. (Repealed by Liverpool Corporation Act 1921 (11 & 12 Geo. 5. c. lxxiv))
Edinburgh Improvement Act 1822 (repealed)	3 Geo. 4. c. lxxviii	24 June 1822
An Act for watching, cleansing and lighting the Streets of the City of Edinburgh, and adjoining Districts; for regulating the Police thereof; and for other Purposes relating thereto. (Repealed by Edinburgh Municipal and Police Act 1879 (42 & 43 Vict. c. cxxxii))
Cork Markets Act 1822	3 Geo. 4. c. lxxix	24 June 1822
An Act for the Establishment of Markets for the Sale of Com and other Articles in the City of Cork.
Glasgow Gas Act 1822 (repealed)	3 Geo. 4. c. lxxx	24 June 1822
An Act to enlarge and amend an Act of His late Majesty, (Note: Glasgow Gas Act 1817 (57 Geo. 3. c. xli)) for lighting the City and Suburbs of Glasgow with Gas. (Repealed by Glasgow Gas Act 1910 (10 Edw. 7 & 1 Geo. 5. c. cxxxi))
Sommers Town Improvement Act 1822 (repealed)	3 Geo. 4. c. lxxxi	24 June 1822
An Act to alter and enlarge the Powers of an Act of His late Majesty King George the Third, (Note: Saint Pancras Improvement Act 1789 (29 Geo. 3. c. 71)) for paving, lighting, cleansing, watering and watching that Part of the Parish of Saint Pancras in the County of Middlesex called Sommers Town. (Repealed by London Government (Borough of St. Pancras) Order in Council 1901 (SR&O 1901/274))
Camden Town Improvement Act 1822 (repealed)	3 Geo. 4. c. lxxxii	24 June 1822
An Act for watching, lighting, watering, cleansing, gravelling and otherwise improving the Foot, Carriage and other public Ways on certain Lands and Grounds in the Parish of Saint Pancras in the County of Middlesex, called Camden Town. (Repealed by London Government (Borough of St. Pancras) Order in Council 1901 (SR&O 1901/274))
Alloa Improvement Act 1822	3 Geo. 4. c. lxxxiii	24 June 1822
An Act to amend an Act of the Forty third Year of His late Majesty, (Note: Alloa Harbour and Town Improvement Act 1803 (43 Geo. 3. c. lv)) for paving, cleansing and lighting the Town of Alloa, and for other Purposes therein mentioned.
St. Marylebone Improvement Act 1822 (repealed)	3 Geo. 4. c. lxxxiv	24 June 1822
An Act for altering, amending and enlarging the Powers of Three several Acts made in the Thirty fifth, (Note: Saint Marylebone Improvement Act 1795 (35 Geo. 3. c. 73)) Forty sixth (Note: St. Marylebone Improvement Act 1806 (46 Geo. 3. c. xc)) and Fifty third (Note: St. Marylebone Improvement Act 1813 (53 Geo. 3. c. clxiii)) Years of the Reign of His late Majesty King George the Third, for regulating the Nightly Watch and Beadles, and for paving, repairing, cleansing and lighting the Parish of Saint Mary-le-bone in the County of Middlesex; and for the better Relief and Maintenance of the Poor thereof, and for divers other Purposes therein mentioned, and for making more effectual Provision for those Purposes. (Repealed by London Government (Borough of St. Marylebone) Order in Council 1901 (SR&O 1901/272))
Cork Improvement and Court of Conscience Act 1822	3 Geo. 4. c. lxxxv	24 June 1822
An Act for amending the several Acts (Note: City of Cork Regulation Act 1763 (3 Geo. 3. c. 17 (I))) (Note: City of Cork Act 1765 (5 Geo. 3. c. 24 (I))) (Note: City of Cork Act 1771 (11 & 12 Geo. 3. c. 18 (I))) (Note: City of Cork Act 1786 (26 Geo. 3. c. 28 (I))) in force for making wide and convenient Streets, Ways and Passages in the City of Cork and the Suburbs thereof; and for paving, cleansing, lighting and otherwise improving the said City; and for regulating the Court of Conscience established therein.
Bedford and Barton Seagrave Road Act 1822	3 Geo. 4. c. lxxxvi	24 June 1822
An Act for continuing the Term, and altering and enlarging the Powers of several Acts passed in the Reign of King George the Second (Note: Bedford and Northamptonshire Roads Act 1754 (27 Geo. 2. c. 33)) and His late Majesty King George the Third, (Note: Northamptonshire Roads Act 1781 (21 Geo. 3. c. 94)) (Note: Road from Westwood Gate to Barton Seagrove Act 1802 (42 Geo. 3. c. xxxvi)) for repairing the Road from Westwood Gate in the County of Bedford, through Rushden and Higham Ferrers, and over Artleborough Bridge, to Barton Seagrave Lane in the County of Northampton.
Whitney Bridge and Bredwardine Bridge and Hay Roads Act 1822	3 Geo. 4. c. lxxxvii	24 June 1822
An Act for more effectually amending, improving and keeping in Repair the Roads leading from certain Bridges over the River Wye, called Whitney Bridge and Bredwardine Bridge, in the County of Hereford, towards the Town of Hay, in the County of Brecon.
Sonning and Egham Road Act 1822	3 Geo. 4. c. lxxxviii	24 June 1822
An Act for more effectually repairing and improving the Road from a Place called The Old Gallows in the Parish of Sonning, otherwise Sunning, in the County of Berks, through Workingham, New Bracknowl and Sunninghill, to Virginia Water, in the Parish of Egham in the County of Surrey.
Hundred House Roads (Worcestershire) Act 1822	3 Geo. 4. c. lxxxix	24 June 1822
An Act to continue the Term and alter and enlarge the Powers of an Act of His late Majesty King George the Third, (Note: Hundred House (Worcestershire) Roads Act 1800 (39 & 40 Geo. 3. c. xcv)) for more effectually amending, widening, improving and keeping in Repair several Roads leading from the Hundred House in the County of Worcester, and also several other Roads therein mentioned.
Road from Banbury to Edgehill Act 1822 (repealed)	3 Geo. 4. c. xc	24 June 1822
An Act for more effectually repairing the Road from the Guide Post near the End of Drayton Lane, near Banbury in the County of Oxford, to the House called The Sun Rising, at the top of Edge Hill in the County of Warwick. (Repealed by Statute Law (Repeals) Act 2013 (c. 2))
Old Stratford and Dunchurch Road Act 1822 (repealed)	3 Geo. 4. c. xci	24 June 1822
An Act for continuing and amending Three Acts of His late Majesty, (Note: Old Stratford to Dunchurch Road Act 1775 (15 Geo. 3. c. 73)) (Note: Old Stratford and Dunchurch Road Act 1796 (36 Geo. 3. c. 141)) (Note: Old Stratford and Dunchurch Road Act 1814 (54 Geo. 3. c. cxxvi)) for repairing the Road from Old Stratford in the County of Northampton to Dunchurch in the County of Warwick. (Repealed by Statute Law (Repeals) Act 2013 (c. 2))
Great Marlow and West Wycombe Road Act 1822 (repealed)	3 Geo. 4. c. xcii	24 June 1822
An Act for more effectually repairing the Road between Great Marlow and West Wycombe, and between Terwick and Aylesbury, in the County of Buckingham; and for making and maintaining Two new Pieces of Road communicating therewith. (Repealed by Princes Risborough Roads Act 1825 (6 Geo. 4. c. xlv))
Chippenham and Westerleigh Road Act 1822 (repealed)	3 Geo. 4. c. xciii	24 June 1822
An Act for repairing, altering and improving the Road from The Stone Pillar or Cross Hand in the Parish of Chippenham in the County of Wilts, to or near to Knox Bridge in the Parish of Westerleigh, in the County of Gloucester; and several other Roads therein mentioned, in the said Counties of Gloucester and Wilts. (Repealed by Statute Law (Repeals) Act 2013 (c. 2))
Caerleon Roads Act 1822 (repealed)	3 Geo. 4. c. xciv	24 June 1822
An Act for repairing and improving several Roads leading to and from the Town of Caerleon in the County of Monmouth. (Repealed by Newport (Monmouthshire) Roads Act 1864 (27 & 28 Vict. c. liii))
Road from Finford Bridge to Banbury Act 1822 (repealed)	3 Geo. 4. c. xcv	24 June 1822
An Act for more effectually repairing the Road leading from the Cross-of-Hand near Finford Bridge in the County of Warwick, through the Town of Southam in the same County, to the Borough of Banbury in the County of Oxford. (Repealed by Finford Bridge and Banbury Turnpike Road Act 1859 (22 & 23 Vict. c. xcii))
Dover and Sandwich, and Kernsey Court Hill and Whitfield Roads Act 1822	3 Geo. 4. c. xcvi	24 June 1822
Ad Act for continuing the Term and enlarging the Powers of an Act of the Forty first Year of His late Majesty King George the Third, (Note: Dover and Sandwich Road Act 1801 (41 Geo. 3. (U.K.) c. xi)) for repairing the Road from the Town and Port of Dover to the Town and Port of Sandwich, and also the Road from the present Turnpike Road leading from Dover to Barham Downs, up Kersney Court Hill to the Parish of Whitfield, otherwise Beausfield, in the County of Kent.
Road from Leatherhead to Stoke (Surrey) Act 1822 (repealed)	3 Geo. 4. c. xcvii	24 June 1822
An Act to continue the Term and Powers of Three several Acts (Note: Leatherhead and Guildford Road Act 1757 (31 Geo. 2. c. 77)) (Note: Surrey Roads Act 1779 (19 Geo. 3. c. 104)) (Note: Leatherhead and Stoke (Surrey) Road Act 1800 (39 & 40 Geo. 3. c. xxvii)) for repairing and widening the Road from the Swan Inn at Leatherhead, to the May Pole at the upper End of Spital or Somerset Street in the Parish of Stoke, near the Town of Guldeford in the County of Surrey. (Repealed by Statute Law (Repeals) Act 2013 (c. 2))
Honiton Roads Act 1822 (repealed)	3 Geo. 4. c. xcviii	24 June 1822
An Act for making, widening, repairing and maintaining certain Roads leading to and from the Town of Honiton in the County of Devon. (Repealed by Honiton Turnpike Roads Act 1855 (18 & 19 Vict. c. clxiv))
Minehead and Bampton Road and Branch Act 1822	3 Geo. 4. c. xcix	24 June 1822
An Act for amending and repairing the Roads from Minehead in the County of Somerset, to Batham Bridge in the Town of Bampton in the County of Devon; and for making a new Branch of Road to communicate therewith.
Road from Northampton to Chain Bridge, Market Harborough, and from Kingsthorpe to Welford Bridge Act 1822	3 Geo. 4. c. c	24 June 1822
An Act for amending, widening and keeping in Repair the Roads leading from the Town of Northampton to Chain Bridge near the Town of Market Harborough, and from the Direction Post in Kingsthorpe to Welford Bridge, all in the County of Northampton.
Road from Cirencester to Cricklade Act 1822 (repealed)	3 Geo. 4. c. ci	1 July 1822
An Act for more effectually amending and repairing the Road from Cirencester in the County of Gloucester, to the Town Bridge in Cricklade in the County of Wilts. (Repealed by Cirencester Roads Act 1825 (6 Geo. 4. c. cxliii))
Brighthemstone Suspension Pier Act 1822	3 Geo. 4. c. cii	5 July 1822
An Act for erecting and maintaining a Chain Pier and other Works connected therewith, at the Town of Brighthelmston, (Note: Brighthemstone is now known as Brighton.) in the County of Sussex.
Westmorland Bridges Act 1822	3 Geo. 4. c. ciii	15 July 1822
An Act for raising Money on the Credit of the County Rates, for the Purpose of rebuilding and repairing certain Bridges in the County of Westmorland.
Brighton and Shoreham Bridge Road Amendment Act 1822 (repealed)	3 Geo. 4. c. civ	15 July 1822
An Act to rectify Mistakes in an Act of this Session of Parliament, (Note: Brighton and Shoreham Bridge Road Act 1822 (3 Geo. 4. c. xiii)) for making the Road from Brighton to Shoreham Bridge, in the County of Sussex. (Repealed by Brighton, Shoreham and Lancing Road and New Shoreham Bridge Act 1830 (11 Geo. 4 & 1 Will. 4. c. lxiii))
Axminster Roads Act 1822	3 Geo. 4. c. cv	15 July 1822
An Act for repairing, widening and maintaining several Roads in the Counties of Dorset and Devon leading to and through the Town of Axminster.
London Bread Trade Act 1822 (repealed)	3 Geo. 4. c. cvi	22 July 1822
An Act to repeal the Acts (Note: London Bread Trade Act 1815 (55 Geo. 3. c. xcix)) (Note: London Bread Trade Act 1819 (59 Geo. 3. c. cxxvii)) (Note: Bread Industry (London) Act 1819 (60 Geo. 3 & 1 Geo. 4. c. i)) (Note: Bread Trade Act 1820 (1 Geo. 4. c. iv)) now in force relating to Bread to be sold in the City of London and the Liberties thereof, and within the Weekly Bills of Mortality, and Ten Miles of the Royal Exchange; and to provide other Regulations for the Making and Sale of Bread, and preventing the Adulteration of Meal, Flour and Bread, within the Limits aforesaid. (Repealed by Food and Drugs Act 1938 (1 & 2 Geo. 6. c. 56))
Middlesex County Rates Act 1822 (repealed)	3 Geo. 4. c. cvii	22 July 1822
An Act for regulating the Office of Treasurer, and altering and amending the Acts (Note: County Rates Act 1738 (12 Geo. 2. c. 29)) (Note: Middlesex County Rates Act 1797 (37 Geo. 3. c. 65)) (Note: County Rates Act 1815 (55 Geo. 3. c. 51)) (Note: County Rates Act 1816 (56 Geo. 3. c. 49)) (Note: County Rates (England) Act 1817 (57 Geo. 3. c. 94)) (Note: County Rates Act 1821 (1 & 2 Geo. 4. c. 85)) now in force for assessing, collecting and levying of County Rates, so far as the same relate to the County of Middlesex. (Repealed by Statute Law (Repeals) Act 2008 (c. 12))
Cork and Skibbereen Road and Branch Act 1822	3 Geo. 4. c. cviii	22 July 1822
An Act for more effectually repairing the Road leading from the City of Cork to the Town of Skibbereen in the County of Cork, and a Branch therefrom communicating with the Town of Kinsale in the said County.
London Bridge Waterworks Removal Act 1822	3 Geo. 4. c. cix	26 July 1822
An Act for removing the Waterworks at London Bridge.
Roads in Lanark, Stirling and Dumbarton Act 1822 (repealed)	3 Geo. 4. c. cx	26 July 1822
An Act for making certain Roads in the Counties of Lanark, Stirling and Dumbarton. (Repealed by Lanark, Stirling and Dumbarton Roads Act 1842 (5 & 6 Vict. c. xxxvii))
Thames Lastage and Ballastage Act 1822	3 Geo. 4. c. cxi	29 July 1822
An Act for further continuing, altering and amending several Acts (Note: Thames Lastage and Ballastage Act 1805 (45 Geo. 3. c. xcviii)) (Note: Thames Lastage and Ballastage Act 1809 (49 Geo. 3. c. clv)) for the better Regulation of Lastage and Ballastage in the River Thames; and for enabling the Corporation of Trinity House of Deptford Strond to reduce, alter, modify, relinquish or abolish Dues payable to the said Corporation, and for other Purposes connected therewith.
Surrey New Roads Act 1822 (repealed)	3 Geo. 4. c. cxii	29 July 1822
An Act for more effectually amending certain Roads in the several Parishes of Lambeth, Newington, Saint George Southwark, Bermondsey, and Christ Church, in the County of Surrey, and for watching, lighting and otherwise improving the said Roads. (Repealed by London Government (Borough of Lambeth) Order in Council 1901 (SR&O 1901/219), London Government (Borough of Bermondsey) Order in Council 1901 (SR&O 1901/264), London Government (Borough of St. Pancras) Order in Council 1901 (SR&O 1901/274) and London Government (Borough of Southwark) Order in Council 1901 (SR&O 1901/275))
City of London Orphans' Fund Act 1822 (repealed)	3 Geo. 4. c. cxiii	5 August 1822
An Act for the better Regulation of the Fund called The Orphans' Fund. (Repealed by Statute Law (Repeals) Act 2013 (c. 2))
Gaelic Chapel and Caledonian Asylum Act 1822	3 Geo. 4. c. cxiv	6 August 1822
An Act to confirm an Agreement entered into between the Trustees of the Subscribers to the Gaelic Chapel and the Caledonian Asylum, and to indemnify the Asylum against certain Covenants in an Indenture of Appointment and Bargain and Sale entered into by the said Asylum in favour of tho said Trustees, and to vest in the Caledonian Asylum the Fee Simple of the Messuage and Chapel described in the above Indenture.

=== Private acts ===
Short title	Citation	Royal assent
Long title
Cokaynes and Kelars Inclosure Act 1822	3 Geo. 4. c. 1 Pr.	3 April 1822
An Act for inclosing Lands in the Manor of Cokaynes and Kelars, otherwise Rebandyshide, in the Parishes of Elmstead and Alresford in the County of Essex, being a Member or Part of the Manor of Wivenhoe in the said County.
Christopher Fenwick's and Duke of Northumberland's Estates Act 1822	3 Geo. 4. c. 2 Pr.	15 May 1822
An Act for carrying into Execution a Contract entered into by Christopher Fenwick Esquire, for the Sale of certain settled Copyhold Hereditaments in the Township of Earsdon, within the Manor of Tynemouth, in the County of Northumberland, to the most Noble Hugh Duke of Northumberland, and for applying the Money thence arising in the Purchase of other Estates, to be settled in lieu thereof.
Brabourne, Smeeth, Bircholt and Sellinge Inclosure Act 1822	3 Geo. 4. c. 3 Pr.	15 May 1822
An Act for inclosing Lands in the Parishes of Brabourne, Smeeth, Bircholt, and Sellinge in the County of Kent.
Seaton and Flimby Inclosure Act 1822	3 Geo. 4. c. 4 Pr.	15 May 1822
An Act for inclosing Lands within the Manor of Seaton in the Parish of Camerton in the County of Cumberland, and in the Parish, Township or Hamlet of Flimby in the said County.
Bobbington Inclosure Act 1822	3 Geo. 4. c. 5 Pr.	15 May 1822
An Act for inclosing Lands in the Manor and Parish of Bobbington, in the several Counties of Stafford and Salop.
Clifton Reynes Inclosure etc. Act 1822	3 Geo. 4. c. 6 Pr.	15 May 1822
An Act for inclosing and exonerating from Tithes Lands in the Parish of Clifton Reynes in the County oi Buckingham.
Ellingham and Ibsley Inclosure Act 1822	3 Geo. 4. c. 7 Pr.	15 May 1822
An Act for inclosing Lands within the Parishes or Chapelries of Ellingham and Ibsley in the County of Southampton.
Sturton and Littleborough Inclosure etc. Act 1822	3 Geo. 4. c. 8 Pr.	15 May 1822
An Act for inclosing Lands in the Parish of Sturton, otherwise Sturton in the Clay, otherwise Sturton in the Steeple, and in the Parish or Chapelry of Littleborough, otherwise Littlebrough, in the County of Nottingham, and for exonerating the same, and also the old inclosed Lands and Grounds within the said Parishes respectively, from the Payment of Tithes.
Wingfield Inclosure Act 1822	3 Geo. 4. c. 9 Pr.	15 May 1822
An Act for inclosing Lands in the Parish of Wingfield in the County of Wilts.
George Drake and Samuel Parker: confirming articles of agreement and authorizing mining leases in Cornwall.	3 Geo. 4. c. 10 Pr.	24 May 1822
An Act for confirming certain Articles of Agreement between George Drake Esquire and others, and Samuel Parker, and to authorize the granting of Leases of Mines in the County of Cornwall.
Ker's Estate Act 1822	3 Geo. 4. c. 11 Pr.	24 May 1822
An Act for vesting Part of the settled Estates of Walter Ker Esquire, and Jane his Wife, in the County of Northumberland (contracted to be sold to the most Noble the Duke and Earl of Northumberland) upon Trust to complete the Sale thereof, and to apply the Purchase Money in Discharge of a Mortgage, affecting the same Estates.
Lockhart's Estate Act 1822	3 Geo. 4. c. 12 Pr.	24 May 1822
An Act for vesting the Lands and Barony of Dryden, and certain other entailed Estates of Sir Charles Macdonald Lockhart Baronet, in Trustees, to be sold; and for laying out the Prices thereof in the Purchase of other Lands and Estates more conveniently situated, to be entailed in a similar Manner.
South Dalton Inclosure Act 1822	3 Geo. 4. c. 13 Pr.	24 May 1822
An Act for inclosing Lands in the Township of South Dalton, in the Parish of South Dalton, in the East Riding of the County of York.
Towersey Inclosure Act 1822	3 Geo. 4. c. 14 Pr.	24 May 1822
An Act for inclosing Lands in the Parish of Towersey in the County of Buckingham.
Thomas Mackenzie's Estate Act 1822	3 Geo. 4. c. 15 Pr.	24 June 1822
An Act for empowering the Judges of the Court of Session in Scotland, to sell such Part of the entailed Estate of Ord in the County of Ross, in Scotland, now belonging to Thomas Mackenzie Esquire, of Ord, as shall be sufficient for Payment of the Debts and Burdens affecting the same.
Bishop of Limerick's Estate Act 1822	3 Geo. 4. c. 16 Pr.	24 June 1822
An Act to enable the Lord Bishop of Limerick and his Successors to demise the Office Houses, Gardens and Demesne, situate at Conigar in the County of Limerick, belonging to the Lord Bishop of Limerick.
Cambridge University Act 1822	3 Geo. 4. c. 17 Pr.	24 June 1822
An Act to authorize the Sale and Conveyance of Ground for the Enlargement of the Public Library and Lecture Rooms in the University of Cambridge, (Note: Old Schools, Cambridge.) and for the Erection of an Astronomical Observatory (Note: Cambridge Observatory.) in or near the said University, and of a Museum (Note: Fitzwilliam Museum.) for the Preservation of the Pictures, Books and other Articles bequeathed to the Chancellor, Masters and Scholars of the said University by Richard Viscount Fitzwilliam, (Note: Richard FitzWilliam, 7th Viscount FitzWilliam.) deceased.
Tufnell's Estate Act 1822	3 Geo. 4. c. 18 Pr.	24 June 1822
An Act for enabling the Trustee under the Will of the late William Tuffnell Esquire, to reduce the Fines for the Copyholds held of the Manor of Barnersbury, devised by his Will, as an Encouragement to the Tenants to build thereon; to grant Building and Repairing Leases of the devised Estates, and for other Purposes.
Plumptre Hospital Act 1822	3 Geo. 4. c. 19 Pr.	24 June 1822
An Act to enable the Master or Guardian of the Charity called Plumptre Hospital in the Town of Nottingham, to sell Part of the Estate belonging to the said Charity, and to apply the Money arising therefrom in manner therein mentioned; and to raise Money by Mortgage of the Residue of the said Charity Estate, and to grant Building or Repairing Leases thereof.
Earl Howe's and Catherine Hall, Cambridge's Estates Act 1822	3 Geo. 4. c. 20 Pr.	24 June 1822
An Act for effecting an Exchange of Lands between the Right Honourable Richard William Penn Earl Home, and the Master and Fellows of Catherine Hall, in the University of Cambridge.
See of St. David Act 1822	3 Geo. 4. c. 21 Pr.	24 June 1822
An Act for restraining the Bishop of Saint David's and his Successors from granting Leases of the Tythes of Llangammarch in the County of Brecknock, Llangevelach in the County of Glamorgan, Llangadoch in the County of Carmarthen, and Glascomb in the County of Radnor, beyond the Term therein mentioned; and for annexing the Tithes of the Consolidated Living of Llanarth and Llanina to the Possessions of the said See, allowing One third of the Annual Profits thereof to the Vicar.
Bacon's Estate Act 1822	3 Geo. 4. c. 22 Pr.	24 June 1822
An Act for carrying into Effect a Partition of Real Estates devised by the Will of John Bacon Esquire, and other Purposes relating to such Estates.
Hospital for Destitute Children, Edinburgh Act 1822	3 Geo. 4. c. 23 Pr.	24 June 1822
An Act for modifying and extending the Purposes specified in a Deed of Destination, executed by Andrew Fletcher and John Mackenzie Esquires; and for building and establishing an Hospital for destitute Children in the City of Edinburgh.
Beilby and Richard Thompson's Estates Act 1822	3 Geo. 4. c. 24 Pr.	24 June 1822
An Act for empowering Trustees to sell and convey Part of the Freehold and Copyhold Estates in the County of York, devised by the Will of Beilby Thompson Esquire, deceased, and Part of the Freehold Estates in the same County, devised by the Will of Richard Thompson Esquire, deceased; and for laying out the Money arising from such Sales respectively, under the Direction of the High Court of Chancery, in the Purchase of other Estates to be settled to the same Uses.
Barrett's Estate Act 1822	3 Geo. 4. c. 25 Pr.	24 June 1822
An Act for vesting Part of the devised Estates of Thomas Barrett Esquire, deceased, in the Counties of Kent and Surrey, in Trustees, to be sold; and for laying out the clear Money arising therefrom (under the Direction of the Court of Chancery) in the Purchase of other Estates, to be settled to the same Uses.
Durham County Schools (Amendment) Act 1822 (repealed)	3 Geo. 4. c. 26 Pr.	24 June 1822
An Act to alter and amend an Act of the Forty first Year of the Reign of His late Majesty King George the Third, (Note: Durham County Schools Act 1801 (41 Geo. 3. (U.K.) c. cxx)) for the Establishment of Schools for the Education of poor Children in the County Palatine of Durham. (Repealed by Statute Law (Repeals) Act 2013 (c. 2))
St. Cuthbert's, Edinburgh Act 1822	3 Geo. 4. c. 27 Pr.	24 June 1822
An Act to enable the Ministers of the Parish of Saint Cuthbert's, Edinburgh, in the County of Mid Lothian, to feu their Glebe Lands lying in the said Parish.
Burlish Common Inclosure Act 1822	3 Geo. 4. c. 28 Pr.	24 June 1822
An Act for inclosing a certain Common or Tract of Waste Land called Burlish Common, in the Manor and Chapelry of Lower Mitton, in the Parish of Kidderminster, in the County of Worcester.
Dringhouses, Mittlethorpe, and Clementhorpe Inclosure Act 1822	3 Geo. 4. c. 29 Pr.	24 June 1822
An Act for dividing and inclosing the common, waste and uninclosed Lands within the Manor and Township of Dringhouses in the County of the City of York; and for extinguishing the Rights of Stray and Average over certain Lands called Half Year Lands, situate within the Townships of Dringhouses, Middlethorpe and Clementhorpe, in the said County of the City, and within such Parts of the Suburbs of the City of York, as are comprised in the Division of the same City called Micklegate Ward.
Dinton Inclosure Act 1822	3 Geo. 4. c. 30 Pr.	24 June 1822
An Act for dividing, allotting and inclosing Lands in the Parish of Dinton in the County of Wilts.
Earl Sommers's Estate Act 1822	3 Geo. 4. c. 31 Pr.	24 June 1822
An Act for settling upon the President, Fellows and Scholars of Trinity College in the University of Oxford, and upon the Rector of the Parish of Dumbleton in the County of Gloucester, certain perpetual Rent Charges issuing out of the Estate of the Right Honourable John Sommers Earl Sommers in Dumbleton, and for vesting certain Lands there in the said Rector; and for vesting certain Tithes and Lands belonging to the said College and Rector respectively in the Mortgagees of the said Earl, subject to Equity of Redemption.
Edward Napier's and Others' Estates Act 1822	3 Geo. 4. c. 32 Pr.	1 July 1822
An Act for vesting certain settled Estates of Edward Berkeley Napier an Infant, and Others, in Trustees to be sold, and for applying the Produce in the Discharge of Incumbrances upon certain devised Estates of the said Edward Berkeley Napier and Others; and for vesting Part of the said devised Estates in Mary Napier Widow, during her life, in lieu of her Life Estate in the said settled Premises.
Viscount Anson's Estate Act 1822	3 Geo. 4. c. 33 Pr.	1 July 1822
An Act for vesting certain Parts of the Settled Estates of the Right Honourable Thomas William Viscount Anson, in the County of Norfolk, in Trustees, in Trust, to carry into Execution Contracts already entered into for Sale of Parts of the same Estates, and to sell the other Parts thereof under the Directions of the Court of Chancery, and to apply the Money arising from the said Sales in the maimer therein mentioned.
Charles Firchild's Estate Act 1822	3 Geo. 4. c. 34 Pr.	1 July 1822
An Act to authorize the Sale of certain Copyhold Messuages and Hereditaments of Charles Firchild, his Wife and Children, in the Manor of Meer and Forton, in the County of Stafford, in Performance of a Contract for the Sale thereof; and for laying out the Purchase Money on other Estates to be settled to the like Uses, and for other Purposes.
Baron Clinton and Saye's Estate Act 1822	3 Geo. 4. c. 35 Pr.	15 July 1822
An Act for vesting certain settled Estates of the Right Honourable Robert Cotton St. John Baron Clinton and Saye, in Trustees, to be sold, for paying of Incumbrances, and for purchasing other Estates with the Residue of the Purchase Monies, to be settled to the same Uses.
Duke of Marlborough's Estate Act 1822	3 Geo. 4. c. 36 Pr.	22 July 1822
An Act for assisting the Sale, under the Direction of the High Court of Chancery, of Part of the Estates of the most Noble George Duke of Marlborough deceased, devised by his Will.
Duxford St. John and Duxford St. Peter Inclosure Act 1822 (Note: This act was not printed by the King's Printer.)	3 Geo. 4. c. 37 Pr.	15 May 1822
An Act for inclosing Lands in the Parish of Duxford Saint John, and Duxford Saint Peter, in the County of Cambridge.
Ashton-under-Lyne Glebe Lands Act 1822	3 Geo. 4. c. 38 Pr.	24 June 1822
An Act to enable the Rector and Patron of the Rectory and Parish Church of Ashton-under-Lyne in the County Palatine of Lancaster for the time being, to grant Leases of the Glebe Lands belonging to the said Rectory.
Reading's Arms Act 1822	3 Geo. 4. c. 39 Pr.	24 June 1822
An Act to enable Kitty Jenkyn Packe Reading, Wife of Charles William Packe of Lowesby Hall in the County of Leicester Esquire, to use and bear the Arms of Readings in compliance with the Provisions of the Will of Jenkyn Reading Esquire, deceased.
Wild's Naturalization Act 1822	3 Geo. 4. c. 40 Pr.	24 June 1822
An Act for naturalizing Charles Frederick Wild.
Arneman's Naturalization Act 1822	3 Geo. 4. c. 41 Pr.	24 June 1822
An Act for naturalizing Theresa Arneman.
Novelli's Naturalization Act 1822	3 Geo. 4. c. 42 Pr.	24 June 1822
An Act for naturalizing Philip Novelli.
Doyle's Divorce Act 1822	3 Geo. 4. c. 43 Pr.	1 July 1822
An Act to Dissolve the Marriage of Sir John Milley Doyle, Knight Commander of the Most Honourable Military Order of the Bath, and Lieutenant Colonel in the Army, with Mary Doyle his now Wife, and to enable him to marry again; and for other Purposes therein mentioned.
Satis's Naturalization Act 1822	3 Geo. 4. c. 44 Pr.	15 July 1822
An Act for naturalizing Catherine Caroline Scellier Satis.
Wück's Naturalization Act 1822	3 Geo. 4. c. 45 Pr.	29 July 1822
An Act for naturalizing Charles Frederick Wück.
Coesvelt's Naturalization Act 1822	3 Geo. 4. c. 46 Pr.	29 July 1822
An Act for naturalizing William Gordon Coesvelt.
Koch's Naturalization Act 1822	3 Geo. 4. c. 47 Pr.	6 August 1822
An Act for naturalizing John Henry Koch.

=== Sources ===
- The Statutes of the United Kingdom of Great Britain and Ireland, 3 George IV. 1822. London: Joseph Butterworth. 1882 – via Internet Archive.
- The Statutes of the United Kingdom of Great Britain and Ireland, 3 George IV. 1822. London: Joseph Butterworth. 1882 – via Internet Archive.
- The Journals of the House of Commons. Vol. 77 – via Internet Archive.

== See also ==
- List of acts of the Parliament of the United Kingdom
