= Vagrancy (England) Act 1822 =

Act of the Parliament of the United Kingdom

- Act of Parliament
- Parliament of the United Kingdom
- Long title: An Act for consolidating into One Act and amending the Laws relating to idle and disorderly Persons, Rogues and Vagabonds, incorrigible Rogues and other Vagrants, in England.
- Citation: 3 Geo. 4. c. 40
- Territorial extent: England and Wales (Note: Section 1.)

Dates
- Royal assent: 24 June 1822
- Commencement: 24 June 1822 (Note: The Acts of Parliament (Commencement) Act 1793.)
- Expired: 1 September 1824 (Note: Section 25.)
- Repealed: 21 June 1824

Other legislation
- Amends: See § Repealed enactments
- Repeals/revokes: See § Repealed enactments
- Repealed by: Vagrancy Act 1824

Status: Repealed

Text of statute as originally enacted

The Vagrancy (England) Act 1822 (3 Geo. 4. c. 40) was an act of the Parliament of the United Kingdom that consolidated enactments related to idle and disorderly persons, rogues and vagabonds, and other vagrants in England.

== Provisions ==
=== Repealed enactments ===
Section 1 of the act repealed all provisions of the law then in force in England relating to idle and disorderly persons, rogues and vagabonds, incorrigible rogues, or other vagrants, without enumerating the enactments repealed. The repeal did not extend to any law then in force for the removal of poor persons born in Scotland, Ireland, or the Isles of Man, Jersey, and Guernsey and becoming chargeable to parishes in England, nor to any law then in force relating to lunatic vagrants.

== Subsequent developments ==
The whole act was repealed, subject to a saving for offences already committed, by section 1 of the Vagrancy Act 1824 (5 Geo. 4. c. 83), which came into force on 21 June 1824.
