= Repeal of Acts Concerning Importation (No. 2) Act 1822 =

Act of the Parliament of the United Kingdom

- Act of Parliament
- Parliament of the United Kingdom
- Long title: An Act to repeal certain Acts, and Parts of Acts, relating to the Importation of Goods and Merchandize.
- Citation: 3 Geo. 4. c. 42
- Introduced by: Thomas Wallace MP (Commons); Robert Jenkinson, 2nd Earl of Liverpool (Lords)
- Territorial extent: United Kingdom

Dates
- Royal assent: 24 June 1822
- Commencement: 24 June 1822 (Note: The Acts of Parliament (Commencement) Act 1793.)
- Repealed: 5 August 1873
Other legislation
| Amends | See § Repealed enactments |
| Repeals/revokes | See § Repealed enactments |
| Repealed by | Statute Law Revision Act 1873 |
| Relates to | Repeal of Acts Concerning Importation Act 1822; Navigation and Commerce Act 1822; Trade Act 1822; Trade Act (No. 2) 1822; Customs Law Repeal Act 1825 |

Status: Repealed

History of passage through Parliament

Records of Parliamentary debate relating to the statute from Hansard

Text of statute as originally enacted

The Repeal of Acts Concerning Importation (No. 2) Act 1822 (3 Geo. 4. c. 42) was an act of the Parliament of the United Kingdom that repealed enactments relating to navigation in the United Kingdom.

== Background ==
In the United Kingdom, acts of Parliament remain in force until expressly repealed. Blackstone's Commentaries on the Laws of England, published in the late 18th century, raised questions about the system and structure of the common law and the poor drafting and disorder of the existing statute book.

In 1806, the Commission on Public Records passed a resolution requesting the production of a report on the best mode of reducing the volume of the statute book. From 1810 to 1825, The Statutes of the Realm was published, providing for the first time the authoritative collection of acts.

By the early 19th century, British customs law, relating to trade, navigation, the import and export of goods, and the collection of customs revenue, had become increasingly intricate and difficult to navigate due to the large number of acts passed that had accumulated over many years. This complexity posed challenges for both commerce and law enforcement. The preamble of the act acknowledged that the existing system had become an impediment to trade and proposed the repeal of inconsistent or obsolete acts "for the encouraging of shipping and navigation".

In 1810, the Lords of the Treasury asked Nicholas Jickling to produce a Digest of the Laws of the Customs, which was published in 1815, numbering 1,375 pages from the earliest period to 53 Geo. 3. This Digest was continuously published to bring the state of the law up to date to the end of every session. In 1814, the Commission of Public Records published their 14th Report, recommending consolidation of the statute law.

In 1822, bills were introduced to encourage shipping and navigation and to repeal related inconsistent or obsolete enactments.

== Passage ==
Leave to bring in the Importation of Goods Bill to the House of Commons was granted to James Brogden MP and the Vice-President of the Board of Trade, Thomas Wallace MP on 19 March 1822. The bill had its first reading in the House of Commons on 25 March 1822, presented by the Vice-President of the Board of Trade, Thomas Wallace MP. The bill had its second reading in the House of Commons on 6 May 1822 and was committed to a committee of the whole house, which met on 20 May 1822 and reported on 23 May 1822, with amendments. The amended bill had its third reading in the House of Commons on 4 July 1822 and passed, with amendments.

The amended bill, now named the Importation of Goods Repeal Bill, had its first reading in the House of Lords on 6 June 1822. The bill had its second reading in the House of Lords on 17 June 1822, introduced by Robert Jenkinson, 2nd Earl of Liverpool, and was committed to a committee of the whole house, which met and reported on 18 June 1822, without amendments. The bill had its third reading in the House of Lords on 19 June 1822 and passed, without amendments.

The bill was granted royal assent on 24 June 1822.

== Provisions ==
=== Repealed enactments ===
Sections 1–4 and 6–32 of the act repealed 36 enactments, listed in those sections.

Section 5 of the act extended the repeals by this act of the Navigation Act 1660 (12 Cha. 2. c. 18), as extended by the Registry of Ships Act 1787 (27 Geo. 3. c. 23 (I), to Ireland.

Section 33 of the act provided that nothing in the act would affect penalties already incurred under repealed acts.

| Citation | Short title | Description | Extent of repeal | Provision of the act |
|---|---|---|---|---|
| 12 Cha. 2. c. 18 | Navigation Act 1660 | An Act for expedient to the further Increase and Encouragement of Shipping and Navigation. | Whereby it is enacted, that no Goods or Commodities whatsoever, of the Growth, Production or Manufacture of Asia, Africa or America, be imported into England, Ireland or Wales, the Islands of Guernsey or Jersey, or Town of Berwick-upon- Tweed, in any other Ship or Ships, Vessel or Vessels whatsoever, but in such as do truly and without Fraud belong only to the People of England or Ireland, Dominion of Wales or Town of Berwick- upon – Tweed, or of the only. Lands, Islands, Plantations or Territories in Asia, Africa or America, to His Majesty belonging, and whereof the Master and Three-fourths of the Mariners at least are English, under the Penalty in the said Act mentioned. I.e., section 3. | Section 1. |
| 12 Cha. 2. c. 18 | Navigation Act 1660 | An Act for expedient to the further Increase and Encouragement of Shipping and Navigation. | Whereby it is enacted, that no Goods or Commodities that are of Foreign Growth, Production or Manufacture, and which are to be brought into England, Ireland, Wales, the Islands of Guernsey and Jersey. I.e., section 4. | Section 2. |
| 12 Cha. 2. c. 18 | Navigation Act 1660 | An Act for expedient to the further Increase and Encouragement of Shipping and Navigation. | Whereby it is enacted, that no Goods or Commodities of the Growth, Production or Manufacture of Muscovy, or of any of the Countries, Dominions or Territories to the Great Duke or Emperor of Muscovy or Russia belonging, as also that no Sort of Masts, Timber Turkish Goods or Boards, no Foreign Salt, Pitch, Tar, Rosin, Hemp or Flax, in British Ships, Raisins, Figs, Prunes, Olive Oils, no Sorts of Corn or Grain, or Ships of the Sugar, Pot -Ashes, Wines, Vinegar or Spirits called Aqua Vitæ, or Brandy-Wine, shall be imported into England, Ireland, Wales or Town of Berwick-upon-Tweed, in any Ship or Ships, Vessel or Vessels whatsoever, but in such as do truly and without Fraud belong to the People thereof, or some of them, as the true Owners or Proprietors thereof, and whereof the Master and Three-fourths of the Mariners at least are English, and that no Currants nor Commodities of the Growth, Production or Manufacture of any of the Countries, Islands, Dominions or Territories to the Ottoman or Turkish Empire belonging, shall be imported into any of the aforementioned Places, in any Ship or Vessel but which is of English built, and navigated as aforesaid, and no other, except only such Foreign Ships and Vessels as are of the Built of that Country or Place of which the said Goods are the Growth, Production or Manufacture respectively, or of such Port where the said Goods can only be or most usually are first shipped for transportation, and whereof the Master and Three-fourths of the Mariners at least are of the said Country or Place, under the Penalty in the said Act mentioned. I.e., section 8. | Section 3. |
| 12 Cha. 2. c. 18 | Navigation Act 1660 | An Act for expedient to the further Increase and Encouragement of Shipping and Navigation. | As relate to the Importation of any of the Commodities of the Streights or Levant Seas, or to the Importation of all Sorts of Goods or Commodities of the Growth, Production or Manufacture of the Plantations or Dominions of Spain or Portugal respectively, from any of the Ports of Spain or Portugal, or Western Islands, commonly called Azores, or Madeira or Canary Islands. I.e., section 12 and 14. | Section 4. |
| 13 Cha. 2. c. 11 | Customs Act 1662 | An Act for expedient to the further Increase and Encouragement of Shipping and Navigation. | Whereby it is enacted and declared, that no Sort of Wines (other than Rhenish,) no Sort of Spicery, Grocery, Tobacco, Pot-ashes, Pitch, Tar, Salt, Rosin, Deal Boards, Fir Timber or Olive Oil, shall be imported from the Netherlands or Germany, upon any Pretence whatsoever, in any Sort of Ships or Vessels whatsoever, upon Penalty of the Loss of all the said Goods, as also of the Ships and Furniture. I.e., section 23. | Section 6 |
| 13 Cha. 2. c. 11 | Customs Act 1662 | An Act for expedient to the further Increase and Encouragement of Shipping and Navigation. | Whereby it is enacted, that no Foreign built Ship shall enjoy the Privilege of a Ship belonging to England or Ireland, although owned or manned by English (except such Ships only as shall be taken at Sea by Letters of Mart or Reprisal, and Condemnation made in the Court of Admiralty as lawful Prize), but that all such Ships shall be deemed as Alien Ships. I.e., section 6. | Section 7 |
| 1 Ann. c. 6 | Land Tax, Forfeited Estates, etc. Act 1702 | An Act for granting an Aid to Her Majesty by divers Subsidies, and a Land Tax | Whereby it is enacted, that it shall and may be lawful to import, from Hamburgh, Wines of the Growth of Hungary. | Section 8 |
| 6 Ann. c. 60 | Importation Act 1707 | An Act for the Importation of Cochineal from any Port in Spain, during the present War, and Six Months longer. | The whole act, as made perpetual by section 3 of the Poor Act 1712 (12 Ann. c. 18). | Section 9 |
| 6 Geo. 1. c. 14 | Importation Act 1719 | An Act for prohibiting the Importation of Raw Silk and Mohair Yarn, of the Product or Manufacture of Asia, from any Ports or Places in the Streights or Levant Seas, except such Ports and Places as are within the Dominions of the Grand Seignior. | The whole act. | Section 10 |
| 6 Geo. 1. c. 15 | Importation (No. 2) Act 1719 | An Act to repeal so much of the Act, intituled An Act for preventing Frauds and regulating Abuses in His Majesty's Customs, passed in the Thirteenth and Fourteenth Years of King Charles the Second, as relates to the prohibiting the Importation of Deal Boards and Fir Timber from Germany. | The whole act. | Section 11 |
| 13 Geo. 1. c. 25 | Importation (No. 2) Act 1726 | An Act for the free Importation of Cochineal, during the Time therein limited. | The whole act. | Section 12 |
| 7 Geo. 2. c. 18 | Importation Act 1733 | An Act, passed in the Seventh Year of the Reign of King George the Second, for the Revival of the said last mentioned Act of the Thirteenth Year of the Reign of King George the First, and also for the free Importation of Indigo. | The whole act as revived and continued by the Importation Act 1821 (1 & 2 Geo. 4. c. 14). | Section 12 |
| 6 Geo. 2. c. 7 | Importation Act 1732 | An Act for the free Importation and Exportation of Diamonds, Pearls, Rubies, Emeralds and all other Jewels and precious Stones | The whole act. | Section 13 |
| 14 Geo. 2. c. 36 | Importation Act 1740 | An Act passed in the Fourteenth Year of the Reign of King George the Second, intituled An Act for opening a Trade to and from Persia through Russia. | The whole act. | Section 14 |
| 23 Geo. 2. c. 34 | Importation of Raw Silk Act 1749 | An Act made in the Twenty third Year of the Reign of the said King George the Second, intituled An Act for permitting Raw Silk, of the Growth or Produce of Persia, purchased in Russia, to be imported into this Kingdom from any Port or Place belonging to the Empire of Russia. | The whole act. | Section 14 |
| 25 Geo. 2. c. 32 | Importation, etc. Act 1751 | An Act, passed in the Twenty fifth Year of the Reign of King George the Second, for the Purpose, among other things, of allowing the Importation of Gum Senega from any Part of Europe. | Whereby it is enacted, that it shall be lawful for any of His Majesty's Subjects to import Gum Senega in British built Ships, navigated according to Law, from any Port or Place in Europe. I.e., section 1. | Section 15 |
| 6 Geo. 3. c. 52 | Customs, etc. Act 1766 | Act, passed in the Sixth Year of the Reign of His late Majesty King George the Third, intituled An Act for repealing certain Duties in the British Colonies and Plantations, granted by several Acts of Parliament, and also the Duties imposed by an Act, made in the last Session of Parliament, upon certain East India Goods exported from Great Britain, and for granting other Duties instead thereof; and for further encouraging, regulating and securing several Branches of the Trade of this Kingdom and the British Dominions in America. | Whereby it is enacted, that it shall and may be lawful to and for any Person or Persons to import and bring into Great Britain, in British built Ships or Vessels navigated according to Law, from any Port or Place whatsoever, any Sort of Cotton Wool. I.e., section 20 | Section 16. |
| 7 Geo. 3. c. 43 | Importation (No. 9) Act 1766 | an Act passed in the Seventh Year of the Reign of His late Majesty King George the Third, for amending and enforcing certain Acts for the more effectual preventing the fraudulent Importation and wearing of Cambrics and French Lawns, shall be repealed. | Whereby it is enacted, that no Cambric or French Lawn shall be allowed to be imported into the Port of London from any Parts beyond the Seas except in British Ships navigated according to Law. I.e., section 2. | Section 17. |
| 15 Geo. 3. c. 35 | Customs (No. 2) Act 1775 | An Act passed in the Fifteenth Year of the Reign of His late Majesty King George the Third (a), intituled An Act to permit the free Importation of Raw Goat Skins into this Kingdom for a limited Time. | The whole act as made perpetual by the Continuance of Laws, etc. Act 1791 (31 Geo. 3. c. 43). | Section 18 |
| 19 Geo. 3. c. 48 | Shipping and Navigation Act 1779 | An Act made in the Nineteenth Year of the Reign of His late Majesty King George the Third, among other things, for explaining so much of the said hereinbefore Goods of Asia, recited Act of the Twelfth Year of the Reign of King Charles the Second, (Note: Navigation Act 1660 (12 Cha. 2. c. 18)) for the encouraging and increasing of Shipping and Navigation as relates to the Importation of Goods and Commodities of the Growth or Production of Africa, Asia or America, manufactured in Foreign Parts. | Whereby it is enacted, that the said Act of the Twelfth Year of the Reign of King Charles the Second (Note: Navigation Act 1660 (12 Cha. 2. c. 18)) shall not extend or be construed to extend to permit any Goods or Commodities whatever of the Growth or Production of Africa, Asia or America, which shall be in any Degree manufactured in Foreign Parts, to be imported into Great Britain, except and unless the same shall be so manufactured in the Country or Place of which the Goods and Commodities are the Growth and Production, or in the Place where such Goods and Commodities can only be or are first shipped for Transportation. I.e., section 1. | Section 19. |
| 19 Geo. 3. c. 48 | Shipping and Navigation Act 1779 | The said last recited Act of the Nineteenth Year of His said late Majesty's Reign. | Whereby or by Construction whereof the Importation of Oil of Cloves, Oil of Cinnamon, Oil of Mace and Oil of Nutmegs, into Great Britain, is permitted. I.e., section 2. | Section 20. |
| 22 Geo. 3. c. 78 | Importation (No. 5) Act 1782 | An Act passed in the Twenty second Year of the Reign of His Late Majesty King George the Third, intituled An Act to permit Drugs the Product of Hungary or Germany, to be imported from the Austrian Netherlands, or any Part of Germany, upon Payment of the Single Duty; to allow the Importation of Hungary or German Wines, and organzined thrown Silk, from the Austrian Netherlands, or any Part of Germany, into Great Britain; and of Timber and other Goods from any Part of Europe, in Ships the Property of Subjects under the same Sovereign as the Country of which the Goods are the Growth, Produce or Manufacture | Except only so far as relates to organzined thrown Silk. | Section 21. |
| 27 Geo. 3. c. 19 | Shipping and Navigation Act 1787 | An Act to enforce and render more effectual several Acts passed in the Twelfth Year of the Reign of King Charles the Second, (Note: Navigation Act 1660 (12 Cha. 2. c. 18)) and other Acts made for the Increase and Encouragement of Shipping and Navigation. | Whereby it is enacted, that any of the Goods or Commodities enumerated or described in the said Act of the Twelfth Year of the Reign of King Charles the Second, (Note: Navigation Act 1660 (12 Cha. 2. c. 18)) for encouraging and increasing of Shipping and Navigation, being the Growth, Production or Manufacture of Europe may be imported under the Conditions, Rules, Regulations and Restrictions contained in the said Act of the Twelfth Year of the Reign of King Charles the Second, and also in certain other Acts recited in the said Act of the Twenty seventh Year of the Reign of His said late Majesty King George the Third, either in Ships and Vessels which, before the First Day of May One thousand seven hundred and eighty six, did truly and without Fraud wholly belong to His Majesty's Dominions, or which are of the Built of His Majesty's Dominions, and registered respectively according to Law, or in Ships or Vessels the Built of any Countries or Places in Europe, belonging to or under the Dominion of the Sovereign or State in Europe of which the said Goods or Commodities so enumerated or described as aforesaid are the Growth, Production or Manufacture respectively, or of such Ports where the said Commodities can only be or are most usually first shipped for Transportation, such Ships or Vessels being navigated with a Master and Three-fourths of the Mariners at the least belonging to such Countries or Places or Ports respectively, and in none other Ships or Vessels whatever. I.e., section 10. | Section 22 |
| 27 Geo. 3. c. 19 | Shipping and Navigation Act 1787 | The said last recited Act of the Twenty seventh Year of His said late Majesty's Reign. | Whereby it is enacted, that it shall and may be lawful for Goods imported any Person or Persons whatever to import or bring from Gibraltar, there from in any Ship or Vessel which, before the First Day of May One thousand seven hundred and eighty six, did truly, without Fraud, wholly belong to His Majesty's Dominions, or are of the Built of His Majesty's Dominions, navigated and registered according to Law, any Goods, Wares or Merchandize, being of the Growth or Production of the Dominions of the Emperor of Morocco, and which shall have been imported into Gibraltar directly from any Part of the said Dominions not lying or being to the Southward of the Port of Mogadore, in Ships or Vessels belonging to or of the Built of His Majesty's Dominions, as before described; navigated and registered according to Law, or in Ships or Vessels belonging to the Subjects of the said Emperor of Morocco. I.e., section 11. | Section 23 |
| 30 Geo. 3. c. 40 | Shipping and Navigation Act 1787 | An Act passed in the Thirtieth Year of the Reign of His said late Majesty King George the Third, intituled An Act to explain and amend an Act made in the last Session of Parliament, intituled 'An Act for repealing the Duties on Tobacco and Snuff, and for granting new Duties in lieu thereof'. | Whereby it is enacted, that no Tobacco (except Tobacco of the Growth, Production or Manufacture of the Plantations of Spain and Portugal, and also except Snuff) shall be imported or brought from Foreign Parts, either wholly or in part manufactured, or in any State or Degree of Manufacture, on Pain of the Forfeitures in the said Act mentioned. I.e., section 40. | Section 24 |
| 35 Geo. 3. c. 117 | Importation (No. 4) Act 1795 | An Act passed in the Thirty fifth Year of the Reign of His said late Majesty King George the Third, intituled An Act for allowing the Importation of Rape Seed or other Seeds used for extracting Oil, from any Country whatsoever, whenever the Price of British Middling Rape Seed shall be above a certain Limit. | Whereby it is enacted or provided, That Rape Seed and all other Seeds commonly made use of for the Purpose of extracting Oil therefrom, shall be imported in a British built Ship, owned and navigated according to Law: Provided always, that nothing herein contained shall extend to allow the Importation of any Rape Seed or other such Seed, in any Ship whatsoever, whenever the Prices of Middling British Rape Seed shall be below the Price of Twenty Pounds per Last. | Section 25 |
| 36 Geo. 3. c. 113 | Importation (No. 2) Act 1796 | An Act passed in the Thirty sixth Year of the Reign of His late Majesty King George the Third, intituled An Act for allowing the Importation of Arrow Root from the British Plantations, and also of Linseed Cakes and Rape Cakes from any Foreign Country, in British built Ships, owned, navigated and registered according to Law, without Payment of Duty. | Whereby it is enacted or provided, that Linseed Cake or Rape Cakes shall be imported from any Foreign Country whatever, in any British Ship or Vessel owned, navigated and registered according to Law. I.e., section 2. | Section 26 |
| 5 Geo. 3. c. 30 | Customs, etc. (No. 2) Act 1765 | An Act passed in the Fifth Year of the Reign of His late Majesty King George the Third, made, among other things, for more effectually supplying the Export Trade of this Kingdom to Africa with such coarse printed Calicoes and other Goods of the Product or Manufacture of the East Indies, or other Places beyond the Cape of Good Hope, as are prohibited to be worn and used in Great Britain. | Under or by virtue of which the Commissioners of His Majesty's Treasury are authorized to allow, by Licence, certain Goods in the said recited Act mentioned to be imported into Great Britain, for the Purpose of Exportation to Africa, under the Conditions and Regulations therein stated. I.e., sections 1 and 2. | Section 27 |
| 8 Ann. c. 12 (Note: This is the chapter in The Statutes of the Realm.) 8 Ann. c. 7 (Note: This is the chapter in The Statutes at Large.) | Taxation (No. 3) Act 1709 | An Act made in the Eighth Year of the Reign of Her Majesty Queen Anne, among other things, for granting to Her Majesty new Duties of Excise, and upon several imported Commodities. | Every Clause, Provision and Regulation, with respect to Licences granted by the Commissioners of Customs for the Importation of Nutmegs, Mace, Cloves and Cinnamon. I.e., section 13. | Section 28 |
| 6 Geo. 1. c. 21 | Excise Act 1719 | An Act, passed in the Sixth Year of the Reign of His Majesty King George the First, intituled An Act for preventing Frauds and Abuses in the Public Revenues of Excise, Customs, Stamp Duties, Post Office and House Money. | Every Clause, Provision and Regulation, with respect to Licences granted by the Commissioners of Customs for the Importation of Nutmegs, Mace, Cloves and Cinnamon. I.e., sections 45 and 46. | Section 28 |
| 8 Geo. 1. c. 18 | Customs, etc. Act 1721 | An Act made in the Eighth Year of the Reign of His said Majesty King George the First. | Every Clause, Provision and Regulation, with respect to Licences granted by the Commissioners of Customs for the Importation of Nutmegs, Mace, Cloves and Cinnamon. I.e., section 21. | Section 28 |
| 43 Geo. 3. c. 68 | Customs Act 1803 | An Act passed in the Forty third Year of the Reign of His said late Majesty King George the Third, intituled An Act to repeal the Duties of Customs payable in Great Britain, and to grant other Duties in lieu thereof. | Whereby it is enacted or provided, that Tobacco of the Growth or Production of any of the Territories or Dominions belonging to the Emperor of Russia, or of any of the Territories or Dominions belonging to the Ottoman or Turkish Empire, shall be imported directly from the aforesaid Territories or Dominions respectively, in British built Ships, owned, navigated and registered according to Law. I.e., section 29. | Section 29 |
| 55 Geo. 3. c. 29 | Trade of Malta Act 1815 | Two Acts, the One passed in the Fifty fifth Year of the Reign of His late Majesty King George the Third, intituled An Act to regulate the Trade between Malta and its Dependencies, and His Majesty's Colonies and Plantations in America, and also between Malta and the United Kingdom. | Whereby it is enacted or provided, That Goods, Wares or Merchandize, being of the Growth, Produce and Manufacture of any Country or Place within the Streights or Levant Seas, or any Raw Silk or Mohair Yarn, being the Growth or Production of any Place within the Dominions of the Grand Seignior, within the Levant Seas, shall be imported from the Island of Malta or the Dependencies thereof, or from the Port of Gibraltar, in British built Ships, owned, registered and navigated according to Law, and in no other Ship or Vessel whatever. I.e., sections 10 and 11. | Section 30 |
| 57 Geo. 3. c. 4 | Gibraltar Trade Act 1817 | Two Acts, the Other passed in the Fifty seventh Year of the Reign of His late Majesty King George the Third, intituled An Act to extend the Privileges of the Trade of Malta to the Port of Gibraltar. | Whereby it is enacted or provided, That Goods, Wares or Merchandize, being of the Growth, Produce and Manufacture of any Country or Place within the Streights or Levant Seas, or any Raw Silk or Mohair Yarn, being the Growth or Production of any Place within the Dominions of the Grand Seignior, within the Levant Seas, shall be imported from the Island of Malta or the Dependencies thereof, or from the Port of Gibraltar, in British built Ships, owned, registered and navigated according to Law, and in no other Ship or Vessel whatever. | Section 30 |
| 56 Geo. 3. c. 37 | Importation (No. 5) Act 1816 | An Act passed in the Fifty sixth Year of the Reign of His late Majesty King George the Third, intituled An Act to permit the Importation of Prunes the Produce of Germany. | The whole act. | Section 31 |
| 59 Geo. 3. c. 74 | Importation, etc. (No. 2) Act 1819 | An Act passed in the Fifty ninth Year of the Reign of His said late Majesty King George the Third, intituled An Act to allow the Importation of Tobacco from the East Indies and other Places, and for confining the Exportation of Tobacco from Great Britain, and the Importation thereof into Ireland, to Vessels of Seventy Tons Burthen and upwards. | I.e., section 2. | Section 32 |

== Subsequent developments ==
The Repeal of Acts Concerning Importation Act 1822 (3 Geo. 4. c. 41) and the Navigation and Commerce Act 1822 (c. 43) were passed at the simultaneously to repeal similar statutes and to further encourage shipping and navigation.

The act was criticised by William Rogers, a member of the Board for the Revision of the Statute Law, for its lack of clarity and organization, with legal commentators noting that it contributed to confusion by requiring inquirers to navigate back and forth through different historical statutes, exacerbating the difficulties of interpreting legislative repeals.

The whole act was repealed by section 1 of, and the schedule to, the Statute Law Revision Act 1873 (36 & 37 Vict. c. 91), which came into force on 5 August 1873.
