= Navigation and Commerce Act 1822 =

Act of the Parliament of the United Kingdom

- Act of Parliament
- Parliament of the United Kingdom
- Long title: An Act for the Encouragement of Navigation and Commerce, by regulating the Importation of Goods and Merchandize, so far as relates to the Countries or Places from whence, and the Ships in which such Importation shall be made.
- Citation: 3 Geo. 4. c. 43
- Territorial extent: United Kingdom

Dates
- Royal assent: 24 June 1822
- Commencement: 24 June 1822 (Note: The Acts of Parliament (Commencement) Act 1793.)
- Repealed: 5 July 1825
Other legislation
Repealed by	Customs Law Repeal Act 1825
Relates to	Navigation Act 1660; Repeal of Acts Concerning Importation Act 1822; Repeal of Acts Concerning Importation (No. 2) Act 1822; Trade Act 1822; Trade Act (No. 2) 1822

Status: Repealed

Text of statute as originally enacted

The Navigation and Commerce Act 1822 (3 Geo. 4. c. 43) was an act of the Parliament of the United Kingdom that regulated the importation of goods and merchandise into the United Kingdom according to the country or place from which they were imported and the nationality and build of the ships in which they were carried, revising and consolidating in a single measure the general principles of the historic Navigation Acts.

== Background ==
The act was one of a package of bills brought forward by Lord Liverpool's government in June 1822 to overhaul Britain's accumulated customs and navigation legislation, alongside the Repeal of Acts Concerning Importation Act 1822 (3 Geo. 4. c. 41), the Repeal of Acts Concerning Importation (No. 2) Act 1822 (c. 42), the Trade Act 1822 (c. 44) and the Trade Act (No. 2) 1822 (c. 45). In introducing the bills, Lord Liverpool explained that they were intended to simplify the law while maintaining the fundamental principle of the Navigation Acts, a preference for British shipping, but that the privileges previously extended only to European trading partners would for the first time be extended, on a reciprocal basis, to the United States and to the newly independent states of South America.

== Subsequent developments ==
The whole act was repealed by section 444 of, and the schedule to, the Customs Law Repeal Act 1825 (6 Geo. 4. c. 105), which came into force on 5 July 1825.
