= Passenger Vessels Act 1803 =

Act of the Parliament of the United Kingdom

- Act of Parliament
- Parliament of the United Kingdom
- Long title: An Act for regulating the Vessels carrying Passengers from the United Kingdom to his Majesty's Plantations and Settlements abroad, or to Foreign Parts, with respect to the Number of such Passengers.
- Citation: 43 Geo. 3. c. 56
- Territorial extent: United Kingdom

Dates
- Royal assent: 24 June 1803
- Commencement: 24 June 1803 (Note: The Acts of Parliament (Commencement) Act 1793.)
- Repealed: 1 August 1823
Other legislation
Repealed by	Passenger Vessels Act 1823

Status: Repealed

Text of statute as originally enacted

The Passenger Vessels Act 1803 (43 Geo. 3. c. 56) or the Passenger Act 1803, was an act of the Parliament of the United Kingdom, passed in 1803. It was the first of many laws intended to regulate the transportation of immigrants and to protect emigrants on board ships from exploitation by transportation companies (such as exorbitant rates and consequent subjection to poor sanitary conditions). The Passenger Act required improved conditions relating to hygiene, food and comfort for passengers travelling to North America. However, this law was not always followed by transportation providers and the spread of infectious diseases such as typhus continued.

This act was established under humanitarian pretences, but the more practical and desired effect was to raise the cost of passage to prevent as many as possible from leaving. Landlords who feared the emigration of their tenants lobbied extensively for this piece of legislation, and where one could previously travel to Canada for £3–4, the price for the same passage was in some cases raised to £10 or more (equivalent to £890 in 2025). The ability to move abroad was subsequently limited to a small class of people until it was repealed in 1826.

== Subsequent developments ==
The whole act was repealed by section 1 of the Passenger Vessels Act 1823 (4 Geo. 4. c. 84), which came into force on 1 August 1823.

== Bibliography ==
- "Moving Here, Staying Here: The Canadian Immigrant Experience". Library and Archives Canada.
- Hunter, James (2008). The Making of the Crofting Community. Birlinn. p. 25. ISBN 978-0-85790-286-3.
