= Passenger Vessels Act 1823 =

Act of the Parliament of the United Kingdom

- Act of Parliament
- Parliament of the United Kingdom
- Long title: An Act to repeal the Laws for regulating Vessels carrying Passengers from the United Kingdom to Foreign Parts, and to make other Provisions in lieu thereof.
- Citation: 4 Geo. 4. c. 84
- Territorial extent: United Kingdom

Dates
- Royal assent: 18 July 1823
- Commencement: 1 August 1823 (Note: Section 1.)
- Repealed: 5 July 1826

Other legislation
- Amends: See § Repealed enactments
- Repeals/revokes: See § Repealed enactments
- Repealed by: Customs Law Repeal Act 1825

Status: Repealed

Text of statute as originally enacted

The Passenger Vessels Act 1823 (4 Geo. 4. c. 84) was an act of the Parliament of the United Kingdom that repealed the earlier statutes regulating the carriage of passengers on vessels sailing from the United Kingdom to parts abroad, and made new provision in their place for the number of passengers such vessels could carry, their provisioning, and the health and safety of passengers on the voyage.

== Provisions ==
=== Repealed enactments ===
Section 1 of the act repealed 5 enactments, listed in that section.

Citation	Short title	Description	Extent of repeal
43 Geo. 3. c. 56	Passenger Vessels Act 1803	An Act passed in the Forty-third Year of the Reign of His late Majesty King George the Third, intituled An Act for regulating Vessels carrying Passengers from the United Kingdom to His Majesty’s Plantations and Settlements abroad, or to Foreign Parts, with respect to the Number of such Passengers.	The whole act.
53 Geo. 3. c. 36	Passenger Vessels Act 1813	An Act passed in the Fifty-third Year of the Reign of His said late Majesty for amending the said Act of the said Forty-third Year of His said late Majesty’s Reign.	The whole act.
56 Geo. 3. c. 83	Passenger Traffic, Newfoundland, etc. Act 1816	An Act passed in the Fifty-sixth Year of the Reign of His said late Majesty, intituled An Act for regulating the carrying ofPassengers to and from the Island of Newfoundland and Coast of Labrador.	The whole act.
56 Geo. 3. c. 114	Shipping Act 1816	An Act passed in the Fifty-sixth Year of the Reign of His said late Majesty, intituled An Act to regulate the Conveyance of Passengers from the United Kingdom to the United States of America in British Vessels.	The whole act.
57 Geo. 3. c. 10	Passenger Vessels Act 1817	An Act passed in the Fifty-seventh Year of the Reign of His said late Majesty, intituled An Act to regulate the Vessels carrying Passengers from the United Kingdom to certain ofHis Majesty’s Colonies in North America.	The whole act.

== Subsequent developments ==
The whole act was repealed by the Customs Law Repeal Act 1825 (6 Geo. 4. c. 105), which came into operation on 5 July 1826.
