= List of acts of the Parliament of the United Kingdom from 1816 =

This is a complete list of acts of the Parliament of the United Kingdom for the year 1816.

Note that the first parliament of the United Kingdom was held in 1801; parliaments between 1707 and 1800 were either parliaments of Great Britain or of Ireland). For acts passed up until 1707, see the list of acts of the Parliament of England and the list of acts of the Parliament of Scotland. For acts passed from 1707 to 1800, see the list of acts of the Parliament of Great Britain. See also the list of acts of the Parliament of Ireland.

For acts of the devolved parliaments and assemblies in the United Kingdom, see the list of acts of the Scottish Parliament, the list of acts of the Northern Ireland Assembly, and the list of acts and measures of Senedd Cymru; see also the list of acts of the Parliament of Northern Ireland.

The number shown after each act's title is its chapter number. Acts passed before 1963 are cited using this number, preceded by the year(s) of the reign during which the relevant parliamentary session was held; thus the Union with Ireland Act 1800 is cited as "39 & 40 Geo. 3 c. 67", meaning the 67th act passed during the session that started in the 39th year of the reign of George III and which finished in the 40th year of that reign. Note that the modern convention is to use Arabic numerals in citations (thus "41 Geo. 3" rather than "41 Geo. III"). Acts of the last session of the Parliament of Great Britain and the first session of the Parliament of the United Kingdom are both cited as "41 Geo. 3". Acts passed from 1963 onwards are simply cited by calendar year and chapter number.

All modern acts have a short title, e.g. "the Local Government Act 2003". Some earlier acts also have a short title given to them by later acts, such as by the Short Titles Act 1896.

== 56 Geo. 3 ==
The fourth session of the 5th Parliament of the United Kingdom, which met from 1 February 1816 until 2 July 1816.

This session was also traditionally cited as 56 G. 3.

=== Public general acts ===
Short title	Citation	Royal assent
Long title
Duties on Glass (Great Britain) Act 1816 (repealed)	56 Geo. 3. c. 1	26 February 1816
An Act to revive and continue, until the Twenty fifth Day of March One thousand eight hundred and eighteen, several laws relating to the Duties on Glass made in Great Britain. (Repealed by Statute Law Revision Act 1873 (36 & 37 Vict. c. 91))
Importation Act 1816 (repealed)	56 Geo. 3. c. 2	26 February 1816
An Act to revive and further continue, until the Twenty fifth Day of March One thousand eight hundred and seventeen, an Act of the Seventh Year of King George the Second, (Note: Importation Act 1733 (7 Geo. 2. c. 18)) for the free Importation of Cochineal and Indigo. (Repealed by Statute Law Revision Act 1873 (36 & 37 Vict. c. 91))
Duties on Malt, etc. Act 1816 (repealed)	56 Geo. 3. c. 3	4 March 1816
An Act for continuing to His Majesty certain Duties on Malt, Sugar, Tobacco and Snuff, in Great Britain, and on Pensions, Offices and Personal Estates, in England, for the Service of the Year One thousand eight hundred and sixteen. (Repealed by Statute Law Revision Act 1873 (36 & 37 Vict. c. 91))
Exchequer Bills Act 1816 (repealed)	56 Geo. 3. c. 4	4 March 1816
An Act for raising the Sum of Eleven Millions, by Exchequer Bills, for the Service of Great Britain, for the Year One thousand eight hundred and sixteen. (Repealed by Statute Law Revision Act 1873 (36 & 37 Vict. c. 91))
Naval Courts-martial Act 1816 (repealed)	56 Geo. 3. c. 5	4 March 1816
An Act to extend the Powers of an Act of the Thirty seventh Year of His present Majesty, (Note: Naval Courts-martial Act 1797 (37 Geo. 3. c. 140)) for enabling His Majesty more effectually to grant conditional Pardons to Persons under Sentence of Naval Courts Martial, and to regulate Imprisonment under such Sentences. (Repealed by Naval Discipline Act 1860 (23 & 24 Vict. c. 123))
Residence on Benefices, etc. (England) Act 1816 (repealed)	56 Geo. 3. c. 6	22 March 1816
An Act to continue, until the Fifth Day of July One thousand eight hundred and sixteen, an Act of the Fifty fourth Year of His present Majesty, (Note: Residence on Benefices, etc. (England) Act 1814 (54 Geo. 3. c. 175)) for explaining and amending several Acts relating to Spiritual Persons holding of Farms, and for enforcing the Residence of such Persons on their Benefices, in England. (Repealed by Statute Law Revision Act 1873 (36 & 37 Vict. c. 91))
Advance by Bank of England Act 1816 (repealed)	56 Geo. 3. c. 7	22 March 1816
An Act to continue until the Fifth Day of April One thousand eight hundred and eighteen, and amend an Act of the Forty eighth Year of Hi« present Majesty, (Note: Advance from Bank of England Act 1808 (48 Geo. 3. c. 3)) for empowering the Governor and Company of the Bank of England to advance the Sum of Three Millions towards the Supply for the Service of the Year One thousand eight hundred and eight. (Repealed by Statute Law Revision Act 1870 (33 & 34 Vict. c. 69))
Cape of Good Hope Trade Act 1816 (repealed)	56 Geo. 3. c. 8	22 March 1816
An Act to continue until the Fifth Day of July One thousand eight hundred and seventeen, an Act of the Forty ninth Year of His present Majesty, (Note: Cape of Good Hope Trade Act 1809 (49 Geo. 3. c. 17)) for regulating the Trade and Commerce to and from The Cape of Good Hope. (Repealed by Statute Law Revision Act 1873 (36 & 37 Vict. c. 91))
Duties on Foreign Packets Act 1816 (repealed)	56 Geo. 3. c. 9	22 March 1816
An Act for charging certain Duties on Foreign Packets or Passage Vessels entering or departing any of the Ports of Great Britain. (Repealed by Customs Law Repeal Act 1825 (6 Geo. 4. c. 105))
Mutiny Act 1816 (repealed)	56 Geo. 3. c. 10	22 March 1816
An Act for punishing Mutiny and Desertion; and for the better Payment of the Army and their Quarters. (Repealed by Statute Law Revision Act 1873 (36 & 37 Vict. c. 91))
Marine Mutiny Act 1816 (repealed)	56 Geo. 3. c. 11	22 March 1816
An Act for the regulating of His Majesty's Royal Marine Forces while on Shore. (Repealed by Statute Law Revision Act 1873 (36 & 37 Vict. c. 91))
Naturalization of Prince Leopald Act 1816 (repealed)	56 Geo. 3. c. 12	28 March 1816
An Act far exhibiting a Bill in this present Parliament, for naturalizing His Serene Highness Leopold George Frederick Duke of Saxe, Margrave of Meissen, Landgrave of Thuringuen, Prince of Cobourg of Saalfeld. (Repealed by Statute Law Revision Act 1873 (36 & 37 Vict. c. 91))
Naturalization of Prince Leopald (No. 2) Act 1816 (repealed)	56 Geo. 3. c. 13	29 March 1816
An Act for the Naturalization of His Serene Highness Leopold George Frederick Duke of Saxe, Margrave of Meissen, Landgrave of Thuringuen, Prince of Cobourg of Saalfeld; and settling his Precedence. (Repealed by Statute Law Revision Act 1873 (36 & 37 Vict. c. 91))
Advance by Bank of England (No. 2) Act 1816 (repealed)	56 Geo. 3. c. 14	11 April 1816
An Act for empowering the Governor and Company of the Bank England to advance the Sum of Six Millions toward the Supply for the Service of the Year One thousand eight hundred and sixteen. (Repealed by Statute Law Revision Act 1873 (36 & 37 Vict. c. 91))
Commerce with United States Act 1816 (repealed)	56 Geo. 3. c. 15	11 April 1816
An Act to carry into effect a Convention of Commerce, concluded between His Majesty and The United States of America. (Repealed by Treaty with United States, etc. Act 1819 (59 Geo. 3. c. 54))
Receiver of Crown Rents Act 1816 (repealed)	56 Geo. 3. c. 16	11 April 1816
An Act for better regulating the Offices of Receivers of Crown Rents. (Repealed by Statute Law Revision Act 1873 (36 & 37 Vict. c. 91))
Excise Act 1816 (repealed)	56 Geo. 3. c. 17	11 April 1816
An Act to continue until the Fifth Day of July One thousand eight hundred and twenty one, certain additional Duties of Excise in Great Britain. (Repealed by Statute Law Revision Act 1873 (36 & 37 Vict. c. 91))
Duty on Lead (Great Britain) Act 1816 (repealed)	56 Geo. 3. c. 18	11 April 1816
An Act to suspend, until the Fifth Day of April One thousand eight hundred and twenty, the Duty on Lead exported from Great Britain. (Repealed by Statute Law Revision Act 1873 (36 & 37 Vict. c. 91))
Bounty on Sugar Act 1816 (repealed)	56 Geo. 3. c. 19	11 April 1816
An Act to continue until the Fifth Day of July One thousand eight hundred and sixteen, an Act of the Forty seventh Year of His present Majesty, (Note: Bounties on Sugar Act 1807 (47 Geo. 3 Sess. 1. c. 22)) for granting an additional Bounty on double refined Sugar exported. (Repealed by Statute Law Revision Act 1873 (36 & 37 Vict. c. 91))
Customs and Excise (Ireland) Act 1816 (repealed)	56 Geo. 3. c. 20	11 April 1816
An Act to make further Provision for the Execution of the several Acts relating to the Revenues, Matters and Things under the Management of the Commissioners of Customs and Port Duties, and of the Commissioners of Inland Excise and Taxes, in Ireland. (Repealed by Statute Law Revision Act 1873 (36 & 37 Vict. c. 91))
Negotiation of Notes and Bills Act 1816 (repealed)	56 Geo. 3. c. 21	11 April 1816
An act to revive and continue, until Two Years after the Expiration of the Restrictions upon Payments in Cash by the Bank of England, an Act (Note: Negotiation of Notes and Bills Act 1797 (37 Geo. 3. c. 32)) for suspending the Operation of an Act of the Seventeenth Year of His present Majesty, (Note: Bills of Exchange Act 1776 (17 Geo. 3. c. 30)) for restraining the Negociation of Promissory Notes and Bills of Exchange under a limited Sum, in England. (Repealed by Statute Law Revision Act 1873 (36 & 37 Vict. c. 91))
Custody of Napoleon Buonaparte Act 1816 (repealed)	56 Geo. 3. c. 22	11 April 1816
An Act for the more effectually detaining in Custody Napoleon Buonaparté. (Repealed by Statute Law Revision Act 1873 (36 & 37 Vict. c. 91))
Intercourse with Saint Helena Act 1816 (repealed)	56 Geo. 3. c. 23	11 April 1816
An Act for regulating the Intercourse with the Island of Saint Helena, during the time Napoleon Buonaparté shall be detained there; and for indemnifying persons in the cases therein mentioned. (Repealed by Statute Law Revision Act 1873 (36 & 37 Vict. c. 91))
Provision for Princess Charlotte, etc. Act 1816 (repealed)	56 Geo. 3. c. 24	11 April 1816
An Act for better enabling His Majesty to make Provision for the Establishment of Her Royal Highness the Princess Charlotte Augusta, and His Serene Highness Leopold George Frederick Duke of Saxe, Margrave of Meissen, Landgrave of Thuringuen, Prince of Cobourg of Saalfeld. (Repealed by Statute Law Revision Act 1873 (36 & 37 Vict. c. 91))
Importation (No. 2) Act 1816 (repealed)	56 Geo. 3. c. 25	30 April 1816
An Act for charging certain Duties on the Importation of Butter. (Repealed by Statute Law Revision Act 1861 (24 & 25 Vict. c. 101))
Importation (No. 3) Act 1816 (repealed)	56 Geo. 3. c. 26	30 April 1816
An Act for charging certain Duties on the Importation of Cheese. (Repealed by Statute Law Revision Act 1861 (24 & 25 Vict. c. 101))
Transportation Act 1816 (repealed)	56 Geo. 3. c. 27	30 April 1816
An Act to amend several Laws relative to the Transportation of Offenders; to continue in force until the First Day of May One thousand eight hundred and twenty one. (Repealed by Statute Law Revision Act 1873 (36 & 37 Vict. c. 91))
Exchequer Bills (No. 2) Act 1816 (repealed)	56 Geo. 3. c. 28	21 May 1816
An act to enable the Commissioners of His Majesty's Treasury to issue Exchequer Bills, on the Credit of such Aids or Supplies as have been or shall be granted by Parliament for the Service of Great Britain, for the Year One thousand eight hundred and sixteen. (Repealed by Statute Law Revision Act 1873 (36 & 37 Vict. c. 91))
Customs, etc. Act 1816 (repealed)	56 Geo. 3. c. 29	21 May 1816
An act to make perpetual certain Temporary or War Duties of Customs, on the Importation into Great Britain of Goods, Wares and Merchandize, and to repeal so much of several Acts passed in the Forty seventh, (Note: Charge of Loan Act 1807 (47 Geo. 3 Sess. 1. c. 55)) Forty ninth (Note: Charge of Loans Act 1809 (49 Geo. 3. c. 92)) and Fifty first (Note: Charge of Loan Act 1811 (51 Geo. 3. c. 61)) Years of the Reign of His present Majesty, as charge any Loans made for the Service of the Years One thousand eight hundred and seven, One thousand eight hundred and nine, and One thousand eight hundred and eleven, upon the War Duties of Customs or Excise, and to charge such Loans on the Duties of Customs made perpetual. (Repealed by Statute Law Revision Act 1861 (24 & 25 Vict. c. 101))
Excise, etc. Act 1816 (repealed)	56 Geo. 3. c. 30	21 May 1816
An act for indemnifying the Commissioners of Excise in Scotland, and all Persons who may have acted under their Authority, in relation to certain Orders issued and Things done relative to certain Acts regarding the Distilleries in Scotland. (Repealed by Statute Law Revision Act 1873 (36 & 37 Vict. c. 91))
Transfer of Contracts, etc. Act 1816 (repealed)	56 Geo. 3. c. 31	21 May 1816
An act for transferring all Contracts and Securities entered into with or given to the Commissioners for Transports to the Commissioners of the Navy and Victualling. (Repealed by Statute Law Revision Act 1873 (36 & 37 Vict. c. 91))
Quartering of Soldiers Act 1816 (repealed)	56 Geo. 3. c. 32	21 May 1816
An Act for fixing the Rates of Subsistence to be paid to Innkeepers and others on quartering Soldiers. (Repealed by Statute Law Revision Act 1873 (36 & 37 Vict. c. 91))
Indemnity Act 1816 (repealed)	56 Geo. 3. c. 33	21 May 1816
An act to indemnify such Persons in the United Kingdom as have omitted to qualify themselves for Offices and Employments, and for extending the time limited for those Purposes respectively, until the Twenty fifth Day of March One thousand eight hundred and seventeen; and to permit such Persons in Great Britain as have omitted to make and file Affidavits of the Execution of Indentures of Clerks to and Solicitors to make and file the same on or before the First Day of Hilary Term One thousand eight hundred and seventeen. (Repealed by Promissory Oaths Act 1871 (34 & 35 Vict. c. 48))
Duty on Corks Act 1816 (repealed)	56 Geo. 3. c. 34	21 May 1816
An Act to charge an additional Duty on Corks, ready made, imported into Great Britain. (Repealed by Statute Law Revision Act 1861 (24 & 25 Vict. c. 101))
Customs Act 1816 (repealed)	56 Geo. 3. c. 35	21 May 1816
An act for the more speedy and effectual Collection of the Tonnage Duty upon Ships Inwards; for empowering the Lords of the Treasury to regulate the Hours of Officers' Attendance in the Port of London; and for permitting Ships to commence and complete their loading of Coals before the Delivery of the Fitters' Certificates. (Repealed by Customs Law Repeal Act 1825 (6 Geo. 4. c. 105))
Importation (No. 4) Act 1816 (repealed)	56 Geo. 3. c. 36	21 May 1816
An act to repeal Two Acts passed in the Reign of King Edward the Fourth (Note: Importation (No. 2) Act 1463 (3 Edw. 4. c. 4)) and King Richard the Third, (Note: Importation Act 1483 (1 Ric. 3. c. 12)) which prohibit the Importation of Wrought Goods and certain other Articles. (Repealed by Statute Law Revision Act 1873 (36 & 37 Vict. c. 91))
Importation (No. 5) Act 1816 (repealed)	56 Geo. 3. c. 37	21 May 1816
An Act to permit the Importation of Prunes the Produce of Germany. (Repealed by Repeal of Acts Concerning Importation (No. 2) Act 1822 (3 Geo. 4. c. 42))
Local Militia Ballot Suspension Act 1816 (repealed)	56 Geo. 3. c. 38	21 May 1816
An act to empower His Majesty to suspend the Ballot or Enrolment for the Local Militia. (Repealed by Statute Law Revision Act 1873 (36 & 37 Vict. c. 91))
Yeomanry (Training) Act 1816 (repealed)	56 Geo. 3. c. 39	21 May 1816
An Act to reduce the Number of Days of Muster or Exercise of Yeomanry and Volunteer Cavalry. (Repealed by Territorial Army and Militia Act 1921 (11 & 12 Geo. 5. c. 37))
Restriction on Cash Payments Act 1816 (repealed)	56 Geo. 3. c. 40	21 May 1816
An act for further continuing, until the Fifth Day of July One thousand eight hundred and eighteen, an Act of the Forty fourth Year of His present Majesty, (Note: Restriction on Cash Payments Act 1803 (44 Geo. 3. c. 1)) to continue the Restrictions contained in the several Acts of His present Majesty, on Payments of Cash by the Bank of England. (Repealed by Statute Law Revision Act 1873 (36 & 37 Vict. c. 91))
Treasury Bills (Ireland) Act 1816 (repealed)	56 Geo. 3. c. 41	21 May 1816
An act for raising the Sum of Two Millions four hundred and seventy thousand Pounds Irish Currency, by Treasury Bills, for the Service of Ireland, for the Year One thousand eight hundred and sixteen. (Repealed by Statute Law Revision Act 1873 (36 & 37 Vict. c. 91))
Treasury Bills (Ireland) (No. 2) Act 1816 (repealed)	56 Geo. 3. c. 42	21 May 1816
An act for raising the Sum of One million seven hundred thousand Pounds British Currency, by Treasury Bills, for the Service of Ireland, for the Year One thousand eight hundred and sixteen. (Repealed by Statute Law Revision Act 1873 (36 & 37 Vict. c. 91))
Duties on Malt, etc. (No. 2) Act 1816 (repealed)	56 Geo. 3. c. 43	31 May 1816
An Act for making certain Allowances of the Duties payable on Malt and Beer. (Repealed by Statute Law Revision Act 1873 (36 & 37 Vict. c. 91))
Duties, etc., on Soap Act 1816 (repealed)	56 Geo. 3. c. 44	31 May 1816
An act to repeal the Duties, Allowances and Drawbacks of Excise, on Hard Soap made in Great Britain and imported from Ireland; and to grant other Duties, Allowances and Drawbacks in lieu thereof. (Repealed by Statute Law Revision Act 1861 (24 & 25 Vict. c. 101))
Local Militia Pay (Great Britain) Act 1816 (repealed)	56 Geo. 3. c. 45	31 May 1816
An Act for defraying the Charge of the Pay-and Cloathing of the Local Militia in Great Britain, to the Twenty fifth Day of March One thousand eight hundred and seventeen. (Repealed by Statute Law Revision Act 1873 (36 & 37 Vict. c. 91))
Civil List Audit Act 1816 (repealed)	56 Geo. 3. c. 46	20 June 1816
An Act for the better Regulation of the Civil List. (Repealed by Statute Law Revision Act 1873 (36 & 37 Vict. c. 91), Statute Law Revision Act 1888 (51 & 52 Vict. c. 3), Statute Law Revision Act 1890 (53 & 54 Vict. c. 33), House of Commons Disqualification Act 1957 (5 & 6 Eliz. 2. c. 20), Statute Law (Repeals) Act 1977 (c. 18) and Sovereign Grant Act 2011 (c. 15))
Treasury Bills (Ireland) (No. 3) Act 1816 (repealed)	56 Geo. 3. c. 47	20 June 1816
An act for raising the Sum of One million two hundred thousand Pounds Irish Currency, by Treasury Bills, for the Service of Ireland, for the Year One thousand eight hundred and sixteen. (Repealed by Statute Law Revision Act 1873 (36 & 37 Vict. c. 91))
Restriction on Cash Payments (No. 2) Act 1816 (repealed)	56 Geo. 3. c. 48	20 June 1816
An act to continue, until Three Months after the ceasing of any Restriction imposed on the Bank of England from issuing Cash in Payment, the several Acts for confirming and continuing the Restrictions on Payments in Cash by the Bank of Ireland. (Repealed by Statute Law Revision Act 1873 (36 & 37 Vict. c. 91))
County Rates Act 1816 (repealed)	56 Geo. 3. c. 49	20 June 1816
An act to explain and amend an Act, passed in the last Session of Parliament, (Note: County Rates Act 1815 (55 Geo. 3. c. 51)) for the more easy assessing, collecting and levying of County Rates. (Repealed by County Rates Act 1852 (15 & 16 Vict. c. 81))
Sale of Farming Stock Act 1816 (repealed)	56 Geo. 3. c. 50	20 June 1816
An Act to regulate the Sale of Farming Stock taken in Execution. (Repealed by Tribunals, Courts and Enforcement Act 2007 (c. 15))
Commerce with United States (No. 2) Act 1816 (repealed)	56 Geo. 3. c. 51	20 June 1816
An Act to amend an Act passed in the present Session of Parliament, intituled "An Act to carry into Effect a Convention of Commence concluded between His Majesty and the United States of America." (Note: Commerce with United States Act 1816 (56 Geo. 3. c. 15)) (Repealed by Treaty with United States, etc. Act 1819 (59 Geo. 3. c. 54))
Glebe Exchange Act 1816 (repealed)	56 Geo. 3. c. 52	20 June 1816
An Act to amend and render more effectual an Act passed in the last Session of Parliament, (Note: Glebe Exchange Act 1815 (55 Geo. 3. c. 147)) for enabling Spiritual Persons to exchange their Parsonage Houses or Glebe Lands, and for other Purposes therein mentioned. (Repealed for Northern Ireland by Statute Law Revision Act 1953 (2 & 3 Eliz. 2. c. 5) and for England and Wales by Endowments and Glebe Measure 1976 (No. 4))
National Debt Commissioners Act 1816 (repealed)	56 Geo. 3. c. 53	20 June 1816
An Act to amend and render more effectual Three several Acts passed in the Forty eighth, (Note: Life Annuities Act 1808 (48 Geo. 3. c. 142)) Forty ninth, (Note: Reduction of National Debt Act 1809 (49 Geo. 3. c. 64)) and Fifty second (Note: National Debt Commissioners Act 1812 (52 Geo. 3. c. 129)) Years of His present Majesty, for enabling the Commissioners for the Reduction of the National Debt to grant Life Annuities. (Repealed by Statute Law Revision Act 1873 (36 & 37 Vict. c. 91))
Exchequer Bills (No. 3) Act 1816 (repealed)	56 Geo. 3. c. 54	20 June 1816
An Act for raising the Sum of Thirteen Millions by Exchequer Bills, for the Service of Great Britain, for the Year One thousand eight hundred and fixteen. (Repealed by Statute Law Revision Act 1873 (36 & 37 Vict. c. 91))
Canals (Ireland) Act 1816 (repealed)	56 Geo. 3. c. 55	20 June 1816
An Act to amend an Act of the Parliament of Ireland, in the Fortieth Year of His present Majesty's Reign, (Note: Inland Navigation Act 1800 (40 Geo. 3. c. 51 (I))) for granting the Sum of Five hundred thousand Pounds for promoting Inland Navigation, and for other Purposes therein mentioned; and to enlarge the Powers vested in the Directors of all Works relating to Inland Navigation in Ireland. (Repealed by Water (Northern Ireland) Order 1999 (SI 1999/662))
Probate Duty (Ireland) Act 1816	56 Geo. 3. c. 56	20 June 1816
An Act to repeal the several Stamp Duties in Ireland, and also several Acts for the Collection and Management of the said Duties, and to grant new Stamp Duties in lieu thereof; and to make more effectual Regulations for collecting and managing the said Duties.
Assessed Taxes, etc. (Ireland) Act 1816 (repealed)	56 Geo. 3. c. 57	20 June 1816
An act to grant certain Rates, Duties and Taxes in Ireland, in respect of Fire Hearths, Windows, Male Servants, Horses, Carriages and Dogs, in lieu of former Rates, Duties and Taxes, and to provide for the more effectual Collection of the said Rates, Duties and Taxes. (Repealed by Assessed Taxes (Ireland) Act 1818 (58 Geo. 3. c. 54))
Beer Act 1816 (repealed)	56 Geo. 3. c. 58	20 June 1816
An Act to repeal an Act made in the Fifty first Year of His present Majesty, (Note: Colouring of Porter Act 1811 (51 Geo. 3. c. 87)) for allowing the Manufacture and Use of a Liquor prepared from Sugar for colouring Porter. (Repealed by Customs and Inland Revenue Act 1885 (48 & 49 Vict. c. 51))
Duty on Malt (Ireland) Act 1816 (repealed)	56 Geo. 3. c. 59	20 June 1816
An act to reduce the Duty of Excise on Malt made in Ireland, and certain Countervailing Duties and Drawbacks in respect thereof. (Repealed by Statute Law Revision Act 1861 (24 & 25 Vict. c. 101))
National Debt Reduction Act 1816 (repealed)	56 Geo. 3. c. 60	20 June 1816
An act to authorize the transferring Stock upon which Dividends shall remain unclaimed for the Space of at least Ten Years at the Bank of England, and also all Lottery Prizes or Benefits, and Balances of Sums issued for paying the Principals of Stocks or Annuities, which shall not have been demanded for the same Period, to the Commissioners for the Reduction of the National Debt. (Repealed by Statute Law Revision Act 1870 (33 & 34 Vict. c. 69))
Lotteries Act 1816 (repealed)	56 Geo. 3. c. 61	20 June 1816
An Act for granting to His Majesty a Sum of Money to be raised by Lotteries. (Repealed by Statute Law Revision Act 1873 (36 & 37 Vict. c. 91))
Dublin Harbour Act 1816 (repealed)	56 Geo. 3. c. 62	20 June 1816
An Act for erecting an Harbour for Ships to the Eastward of Dunleary, within the Port of Dublin. (Repealed by Dublin Port and Docks Act 1869 (32 & 33 Vict. c. c))
Millbank Penitentiary Act 1816 (repealed)	56 Geo. 3. c. 63	22 June 1816
An Act to regulate the General Penitentiary for Convicts, at Millbank, in the County of Middlesex. (Repealed by Millbank Penitentiary Act 1837 (7 Will. 4 & 1 Vict. c. 13) and Millbank Prison Act 1843 (6 & 7 Vict. c. 26))
Militia Act 1816 (repealed)	56 Geo. 3. c. 64	22 June 1816
An act to repeal several Acts relating to the Militia of Great Britain, and to amend other Acts relating thereto. (Repealed by Militia (Voluntary Enlistment) Act 1875 (38 & 39 Vict. c. 69))
Duties on Property, etc. Act 1816 (repealed)	56 Geo. 3. c. 65	22 June 1816
An act to explain and amend the Acts for granting Duties on the Profits arising from Property, Professions, Trades and Offices, so far as extend to the due Assessment and Collection of the Duties for past Years; for confirming certain Abatements already made of the said Duties, and exempting Collectors' Bonds from the Stamp Duties. (Repealed by Statute Law Revision Act 1873 (36 & 37 Vict. c. 91))
Assessed Taxes Act 1816 (repealed)	56 Geo. 3. c. 66	22 June 1816
An act for reducing the Duties payable on Horses, used for the Purposes therein mentioned, for Two Years; and for repealing the Acts granting Allowances in respect of Children. (Repealed by Revenue Act 1869 (32 & 33 Vict. c. 14))
Exercise of Trades by Soldiers, etc. Act 1816 (repealed)	56 Geo. 3. c. 67	22 June 1816
An act to enable such Officers, Marines and Soldiers, as have been in the Land or Sea Service, or in the Marines, or in the Militia, or any Corps of Fencible Men, since the Forty second Year of His present Majesty's Reign, to exercise Trades. (Repealed by Statute Law Revision Act 1873 (36 & 37 Vict. c. 91))
Coin Act 1816 or the Coinage Act 1816 or Liverpool's Act (repealed)	56 Geo. 3. c. 68	22 June 1816
An Act to provide for a New Silver Coinage, and to regulate the Currency of the Gold and Silver Coin of this Realm. (Repealed by Coinage Act 1870 (33 & 34 Vict. c. 10))
Duties on Madder Act 1816 (repealed)	56 Geo. 3. c. 69	22 June 1816
An act to continue, until the Twenty fifth Day of March One thousand eight hundred and eighteen, Two Acts of the Fifty fourth Year of His present Majesty, (Note: Customs (No. 5) Act 1813 (54 Geo. 3. c. 26)) (Note: Customs (No. 6) Act 1813 (54 Geo. 3. c. 27)) for repealing the Duties of Customs on Madder imported into Great Britain, and for granting other Duties in lieu thereof. (Repealed by Statute Law Revision Act 1873 (36 & 37 Vict. c. 91))
National Debt Redemption (Ireland) Act 1816 (repealed)	56 Geo. 3. c. 70	22 June 1816
An act to alter and amend several Acts relating to the Redemption of the National Debt of Ireland, and to make further Provision in respect thereof. (Repealed by Statute Law Revision Act 1861 (24 & 25 Vict. c. 101))
Arrears of Crown, etc. Rents (Ireland) Act 1816 (repealed)	56 Geo. 3. c. 71	22 June 1816
An act to amend an Act of the Fifty first Year of His present Majesty's Reign, (Note: Arrears of Crown Rents (Ireland) Act 1811 (51 Geo. 3. c. 91)) for discharging certain Arrears of Quit, Crown and Composition Rents in Ireland. (Repealed by Statute Law Revision Act 1873 (36 & 37 Vict. c. 91))
Yeomanry Corps (Ireland) Act 1816 (repealed)	56 Geo. 3. c. 72	22 June 1816
An act to continue and amend so much of an Act of the Forty third Year of His present Majesty's Reign (Note: Yeomanry and Volunteer Cavalry Act 1803 (43 Geo. 3. c. 121)) for authorizing the billetting and subjecting to Military Discipline certain Yeomanry Corps and Officers of Cavalry or Infantry, as relates to such Corps in Ireland. (Repealed by Statute Law Revision Act 1873 (36 & 37 Vict. c. 91))
Stealing Property from Mines Act 1816 (repealed)	56 Geo. 3. c. 73	22 June 1816
An act for removing Difficulties in the Conviction of Offenders dealing Property from Mines. (Repealed by Statute Law Revision Act 1861 (24 & 25 Vict. c. 101))
Lands at Sheerness and Chatham Act 1816	56 Geo. 3. c. 74	24 June 1816
An act for the Purchase of certain Lands, Tenements and Hereditaments at Sheerness and Chatham, in the County of Kent, for the Use of the Navy.
Duties on Rape Seed, etc. Act 1816 (repealed)	56 Geo. 3. c. 75	24 June 1816
An Act to repeal the Duties of Customs upon the Importation into the United Kingdom of Rape Seed and Cole Seed, and to grant other Duties in lieu thereof. (Repealed by Statute Law Revision Act 1861 (24 & 25 Vict. c. 101))
Exportation Act 1816 (repealed)	56 Geo. 3. c. 76	24 June 1816
An Act for repealing the several Bounties on the Exportation of Refined Sugar, from any Part of the United Kingdom, and for allowing other Bounties in lieu thereof, until the Fifth Day of July One thousand eight hundred and eighteen. (Repealed by Statute Law Revision Act 1873 (36 & 37 Vict. c. 91))
Customs (No. 2) Act 1816 (repealed)	56 Geo. 3. c. 77	24 June 1816
An act to repeal certain Duties granted by an Act passed in the last Session of Parliament, (Note: South Sea Company Act 1815 (55 Geo. 3. c. 57)) for repealing the Provisions of former Acts granting exclusive Privileges of Trade to the South Sea Company. (Repealed by Statute Law Revision Act 1861 (24 & 25 Vict. c. 101))
Duties on Paper (Ireland) Act 1816 (repealed)	56 Geo. 3. c. 78	24 June 1816
An act for the better regulating and securing the Collection of the Duties on Paper in Ireland, and to prevent Frauds therein. (Repealed by Duties on Paper Act 1839 (2 & 3 Vict. c. 23))
Duties on Rape Seed, etc. (No. 2) Act 1816 (repealed)	56 Geo. 3. c. 79	25 June 1816
An act for repealing the Duties of Customs on Rape Seed Cakes, Linseed Cakes, Bones of Cattle and other Animals, and of Fish, except Whale Fins, imported into Great Britain; and for granting other Duties in lieu thereof. (Repealed by Statute Law Revision Act 1861 (24 & 25 Vict. c. 101))
Naval Stores Act 1816 (repealed)	56 Geo. 3. c. 80	25 June 1816
An act to enable the principal Officers and Commissioners of His Majesty's Navy resident on Foreign Stations to grant Certificates of Stores or Goods, which may be sold by such Officers or Commissioners at such Foreign Stations. (Repealed by Naval and Victualling Stores Act 1862 (25 & 26 Vict. c. 64))
Oil of Vitriol Act 1816 (repealed)	56 Geo. 3. c. 81	25 June 1816
An act to alter the Period during which Manufacturers of Oil of Vitriol are to deliver in their Accounts. (Repealed by Customs Law Repeal Act 1825 (6 Geo. 4. c. 105))
Vice-Admiralty Courts Act 1816 (repealed)	56 Geo. 3. c. 82	25 June 1816
An act to render valid the judicial Acts of Surrogates of Vice Admiralty Courts abroad, during Vacancies in Offices of Judges of such Courts. (Repealed except for India by Vice Admiralty Courts Act 1863 (26 & 27 Vict. c. 24) and for India by Statute Law Revision Act 1890 (53 & 54 Vict. c. 33))
Passenger Traffic, Newfoundland, etc. Act 1816 (repealed)	56 Geo. 3. c. 83	25 June 1816
An act for regulating the carrying of Passengers to and from the Island of Newfoundland and Coast of Labrador. (Repealed by Passenger Vessels Act 1823 (4 Geo. 4. c. 84))
Holyhead Harbour Act 1816 (repealed)	56 Geo. 3. c. 84	25 June 1816
An act for the better Accommodation of His Majesty's Packets within the Harbour of Holyhead, in the island of Anglesea; and for the better Regulation of the Shipping therein. (Repealed by Holyhead Road Act 1823 (4 Geo. 4. c. 74))
Customs and Excise Act 1816 (repealed)	56 Geo. 3. c. 85	26 June 1816
An act to make further Regulations for securing the Collection of the Duties of Customs and Excise in Ireland, and for the Importation into Ireland of American Staves, and of old Plate and Books from Great Britain. (Repealed by Statute Law Revision Act 1861 (24 & 25 Vict. c. 101))
Aliens Act 1816 (repealed)	56 Geo. 3. c. 86	26 June 1816
An Act for establishing Regulations respecting Aliens arriving in or resident in this Kingdom, in certain cases, for Two Years from the passing of this Act, and until the End of the Session of Parliament in which the said Two Years shall expire, if Parliament shall be then sitting. (Repealed by Statute Law Revision Act 1861 (24 & 25 Vict. c. 101))
Grand Jury (Ireland) Act 1816 (repealed)	56 Geo. 3. c. 87	26 June 1816
An act to regulate Proceedings of Grand Juries in Ireland, upon Bills of Indictment. (Repealed by Statute Law Revision Act 1873 (36 & 37 Vict. c. 91), Statute Law Revision (No. 2) Act 1890 (53 & 54 Vict. c. 51), Perjury Act (Northern Ireland) 1946 (c. 13 (N.I.)) and Grand Jury (Abolition) Act (Northern Ireland) 1969 (c. 15 (N.I.)))
Recovery of Tenements, etc. (Ireland) Act 1816 (repealed)	56 Geo. 3. c. 88	26 June 1816
An Act to amend the Law of Ireland respecting the Recovery of Tenements from absconding, overholding, and defaulting Tenants; and for the Protection of the Tenant from undue Distress. (Repealed by Civil Bill Courts (Ireland) Act 1851 (14 & 15 Vict. c. 57) and Landlord and Tenant Law Amendment (Ireland) Act 1860 (23 & 24 Vict. c. 154))
National Debt Reduction (No. 2) Act 1816 (repealed)	56 Geo. 3. c. 89	26 June 1816
An act to provide for the Charge of certain Additions to the Public Debt of Ireland, for the Service of the Year One thousand eight hundred and sixteen. (Repealed by Statute Law Revision Act 1870 (33 & 34 Vict. c. 69))
Militia Pay (Great Britain) Act 1816 (repealed)	56 Geo. 3. c. 90	26 June 1816
An act to defray the Charge of the Pay, Clothing and Contingent Expences of the Disembodied Militia in Great Britain, and of the Miners of Cornwall and Devon; and for granting Allowances, in certain cases, to Subaltern Officers, Adjutants, Surgeons' Mates and Serjeant Majors of Militia, until the Twenty fifth Day of March One thousand eight hundred and seventeen. (Repealed by Statute Law Revision Act 1873 (36 & 37 Vict. c. 91))
Trade of Demerara, etc. Act 1816 (repealed)	56 Geo. 3. c. 91	26 June 1816
An act to regulate the Trade of the Colonies of Demerara, Berbice and Essequibo; to allow the Importation into, and Exportation from, such Colonies, of certain Articles, by Dutch Proprietors of the European Dominions of His Majesty the King of the Netherlands; and to repeal an Act of the Fifty fourth Year of His present Majesty, (Note: Trade Act 1814 (54 Geo. 3. c. 72)) for permitting a Trade between the United Provinces and certain Colonies in His Majesty's Possession. (Repealed by Customs Law Repeal Act 1825 (6 Geo. 4. c. 105))
Exportation (No. 2) Act 1816 (repealed)	56 Geo. 3. c. 92	26 June 1816
An act to enable His Majesty to authorize the Exportation of the Machinery necessary for erecting a Mint in the United States of America. (Repealed by Statute Law Revision Act 1873 (36 & 37 Vict. c. 91))
Customs (No. 3) Act 1816 (repealed)	56 Geo. 3. c. 93	26 June 1816
An Act for enabling the Officers of the Customs at Creeks, Harbours and Basins of Great Britain, to take Entries of Ships and Goods arriving from and bound to Ireland. (Repealed by Customs Law Repeal Act 1825 (6 Geo. 4. c. 105))
Salt Duty Act 1816 (repealed)	56 Geo. 3. c. 94	26 June 1816
An Act to allow Makers of Oxygenated Muriatic Acid to take crushed Rock Salt, Duty free, for making such Acid or Oxymuriate of Lime, for bleaching Linen and Cotton. (Repealed by Statute Law Revision Act 1861 (24 & 25 Vict. c. 101))
Transfer of Stock of Hertford College Act 1816 (repealed)	56 Geo. 3. c. 95	26 June 1816
An Act to authorize such Person as His Majesty shall appoint to transfer a certain Sum in Three Pounds per Cent. Reduced Annuities, now standing in the Name of the dissolved College of Hertford, in the University of Oxford; and also to receive Dividends due upon such Annuities. (Repealed by Statute Law Revision Act 1873 (36 & 37 Vict. c. 91))
Bank of England (Advance) Act 1816 (repealed)	56 Geo. 3. c. 96	26 June 1816
An act for establishing an Agreement with the Governor and Company of the Bank of England, for advancing the Sum of Three Millions, for the Service of the Year One thousand eight hundred and sixteen. (Repealed by Statute Law (Repeals) Act 1973 (c. 39))
Advance of Unclaimed Dividends, etc. Act 1816 (repealed)	56 Geo. 3. c. 97	26 June 1816
An act to authorize the advancing, for the Public Service, a Proportion of the Balance that shall remain from time to time in the Bank of England for the Payment of Dividends on account of the Public Debt, for Lottery Prizes or Benefits not claimed, and Principals of Stocks and Annuities remaining unclaimed. (Repealed by Bank of England Act 1861 (24 & 25 Vict. c. 3))
Consolidated Fund Act 1816	56 Geo. 3. c. 98	1 July 1816
An Act to unite and consolidate into One Fund all the Public Revenues of Great Britain and Ireland, and to provide for the Application thereof to the General Service of the United Kingdom.
British Museum Act 1816 or the Elgin Marbles Act (repealed)	56 Geo. 3. c. 99	1 July 1816
An Act to vest the Elgin Collection of Ancient Marbles and Sculpture in the Trustees of the British Museum for the Use of the Public. (Repealed by British Museum Act 1963 (c. 24))
Habeas Corpus Act 1816 or Serjeant Onslow's Act	56 Geo. 3. c. 100	1 July 1816
An Act for more effectually securing the Liberty of the Subject.
Naval Officers' Half Pay Act 1816 (repealed)	56 Geo. 3. c. 101	1 July 1816
An act for enabling the Officers in His Majesty's Navy, and their Representatives, to draw for and receive their Half Pay; and for transferring the Duty of making certain Payments from the Clerks of the Cheque at His Majesty's Dock Yards to the Clerks of the Treasurer of the Navy at the same Yards. (Repealed by Pay of the Navy Act 1830 (11 Geo. 4 & 1 Will. 4. c. 20))
Insolvent Debtors (England) Act 1816 (repealed)	56 Geo. 3. c. 102	1 July 1816
An act to amend the Act of the Fifty third Year of His present Majesty, intituled "An act for the Relief of Insolvent Debtors in England;" (Note: Insolvent Debtors (England) Act 1813 (53 Geo. 3. c. 102)) and to give further Powers to the Court appointed by the said Act. (Repealed by Statute Law Revision Act 1873 (36 & 37 Vict. c. 91))
Duty on Paper Act 1816 (repealed)	56 Geo. 3. c. 103	1 July 1816
An act for further securing the Duties on Paper and Pasteboard; and for repealing the Countervailing Duty upon Pasteboard imported from Ireland, and the Drawback upon Pasteboard exported; and granting other Countervailing Duties and Drawbacks in lieu thereof. (Repealed by Duties on Paper Act 1839 (2 & 3 Vict. c. 23))
Excise (No. 2) Act 1816 (repealed)	56 Geo. 3. c. 104	1 July 1816
An act for the making more effectual Provision for the Prevention of Smuggling, and rewarding Officers and Persons making Seizures and capturing Smuggling Vessels; for licensing Luggers employed in the North Sea Fishery; and obliging Exporters of Exciseable Goods on Drawback to give Notice of Shipment. (Repealed by Statute Law Revision (No. 2) Act 1890 (53 & 54 Vict. c. 51))
Trade in Spirits Act 1816 (repealed)	56 Geo. 3. c. 105	1 July 1816
An act to amend and continue, until the End of the next Session of Parliament, an Act of the Fifty fourth Year of His present Majesty (Note: Spirit Trade Act 1814 (54 Geo. 3. c. 149)) for regulating the Trade in Spirits between Great Britain and Ireland reciprocally; and to grant and allow new countervailing Duties and Drawbacks on Spirits imported and exported between England and Scotland and Ireland respectively. (Repealed by Statute Law Revision Act 1873 (36 & 37 Vict. c. 91))
Duties on Spirits, etc. (Scotland) Act 1816 (repealed)	56 Geo. 3. c. 106	1 July 1816
An act to repeal the Duties payable in Scotland, upon Wash and Spirits and Distillers' Licences; to grant other Duties in lieu thereof; and to establish further Regulations for the Distillation of Spirits from Corn for Home Consumption in Scotland, until the Tenth Day of November One thousand eight hundred and eighteen. (Repealed by Statute Law Revision Act 1873 (36 & 37 Vict. c. 91))
Inventories (Scotland) Act 1816 (repealed)	56 Geo. 3. c. 107	1 July 1816
An act to amend an Act of the last Session of Parliament (Note: Stamp Act 1815 (55 Geo. 3. c. 184)) relating to Stamp Duties in Great Britain, so far as relates to Inventories to be exhibited and recorded in any Commissary Court in Scotland. (Repealed by Statute Law Revision Act 1873 (36 & 37 Vict. c. 91))
Excise (No. 3) Act 1816 (repealed)	56 Geo. 3. c. 108	1 July 1816
An act to repeal certain Drawbacks and Countervailing Duties of Excise on Beer and Malt; to alter the Drawbacks on Plate Glass, and to prevent Frauds therein. (Repealed by Statute Law Revision Act 1873 (36 & 37 Vict. c. 91))
Exportation (No. 3) Act 1816 (repealed)	56 Geo. 3. c. 109	1 July 1816
An act to continue, until the Fifth Day of July One thousand eight hundred and seventeen, an Act of the Forty sixth Year of His present Majesty, (Note: Bounty on Silk Manufactures Act 1806 (46 Geo. 3. c. 110)) for granting an additional Bounty on the Exportation of the Silk Manufactures of Great Britain. (Repealed by Statute Law Revision Act 1873 (36 & 37 Vict. c. 91))
Trades of Tanners and Curriers Act 1816 (repealed)	56 Geo. 3. c. 110	1 July 1816
An act for the further Regulation of the Trades of Tanners and Carriers. (Repealed by Duties and Drawbacks on Leather Act 1822 (3 Geo. 4. c. 83))
Duties on Spirits (Ireland) Act 1816 (repealed)	56 Geo. 3. c. 111	1 July 1816
An act to repeal Part of the Duty on Spirits distilled in Ireland, to reduce the Drawback on such Spirits exported to Foreign Parts, and to make further Regulations for the Collection of the said Duties and the Duties on Licences for retailing Spirituous and other Liquors in Ireland. (Repealed by Statute Law Revision Act 1873 (36 & 37 Vict. c. 91))
Distillation of Spirits (Ireland) Act 1816 (repealed)	56 Geo. 3. c. 112	1 July 1816
An act to make certain Provisions for modifying the several Acts for imposing and levying of Fines, in respect of unlawful Distillation of Spirits in Ireland. (Repealed by Illicit Distillation (Ireland) Act 1831 (1 & 2 Will. 4. c. 55))
Beer, etc., Licences (Great Britain) Act 1816 (repealed)	56 Geo. 3. c. 113	1 July 1816
An act for repealing the Duties payable for Licences for retailing Beer, Ale, Cyder, Percy or Spirits in Great Britain, and for imposing other Duties in lieu thereof. (Repealed by Statute Law Revision Act 1861 (24 & 25 Vict. c. 101))
Shipping Act 1816 (repealed)	56 Geo. 3. c. 114	1 July 1816
An act to regulate the Conveyance of Passengers from the United Kingdom to the United States of America, in British Vessels. (Repealed by Passenger Vessels Act 1823 (4 Geo. 4. c. 84))
Claremont Estate Purchase (Grant of Life Interest) Act 1816 (repealed)	56 Geo. 3. c. 115	1 July 1816
An act for ratifying the Purchase of the Claremont Estate, and for settling the same as a Residence for Her Royal Highness the Princess Charlotte Augusta and His Serene Highness Leopold George Frederick Prince of Cobourg of Saalfeld. (Repealed by Statute Law (Repeals) Act 1977 (c. 18))
Prisoner Act 1816 (repealed)	56 Geo. 3. c. 116	1 July 1816
An act to explain and amend an Act passed in the Fifty fifth Year of the Reign of His present Majesty, intituled "An act for the Abolition of Gaol and other Fees connected with the Gaols in England." (Note: Gaol Fees Abolition Act 1815 (55 Geo. 3. c. 50)) (Repealed by Statute Law Revision Act 1890 (53 & 54 Vict. c. 33))
Custody of Insane Persons Act 1816 (repealed)	56 Geo. 3. c. 117	1 July 1816
An act to amend an Act passed in the Thirty ninth and Fortieth Year of the Reign of His present Majesty for the safe Custody of Insane Persons charged with Offences. (Repealed by County Lunatic Asylums (England) Act 1828 (9 Geo. 4. c. 40))
Duty on Oil, etc. Act 1816 (repealed)	56 Geo. 3. c. 118	1 July 1816
An act for admitting Oil and Blubber from the British Colonies in North America, upon Payment of the like Duty as Oil and Blubber from Newfoundland. (Repealed by Statute Law Revision Act 1861 (24 & 25 Vict. c. 101))
Mutiny Acts Amendment Act 1816 (repealed)	56 Geo. 3. c. 119	1 July 1816
An act to explain and amend an Act passed in the present Session of Parliament (Note: Mutiny Act 1816 (56 Geo. 3. c. 10)) for punishing Mutiny and Desertion in relation to the Transportation of Offenders. (Repealed by Statute Law Revision Act 1861 (24 & 25 Vict. c. 101))
Prisoners Returns (Ireland) Act 1816 (repealed)	56 Geo. 3. c. 120	1 July 1816
An act to procure Annual Returns of Persons committed, tried and convicted for Criminal Offences and Misdemeanors in Ireland. (Repealed by Treatment of Offenders Act (Northern Ireland) 1968 (c. 29 (N.I.)))
Militia Pay (Ireland) Act 1816 (repealed)	56 Geo. 3. c. 121	1 July 1816
An act for defraying, until the Twenty fifth Day of June One thousand eight hundred and seventeen, the Charge of the Pay and Clothing of the Militia of Ireland; and for making Allowances in certain cases to Subaltern Officers of the said Militia during Peace. (Repealed by Statute Law Revision Act 1873 (36 & 37 Vict. c. 91))
Court of Exchequer (Ireland) Act 1816 (repealed)	56 Geo. 3. c. 122	1 July 1816
An act to make Provision for securing, for a Time to be limited, the Profits of the Office of Clerk of the Pleas of His Majesty's Court of Exchequer in Ireland. (Repealed by Statute Law Revision Act 1873 (36 & 37 Vict. c. 91))
Residence on Benefices, etc. (England) (No. 2) Act 1816 (repealed)	56 Geo. 3. c. 123	1 July 1816
An act to continue, until the Fifth Day of April One thousand eight hundred and seventeen, an Act of the Fifty Fourth Year of His present Majesty, for explaining and amending several Acts relating to Spiritual Persons holding of Farms, and for enforcing the Residence of such Persons on their Benefices in England. (Repealed by Statute Law Revision Act 1873 (36 & 37 Vict. c. 91))
Bringing of Coals to London, etc. Act 1816 (repealed)	56 Geo. 3. c. 124	1 July 1816
An act to continue, until the First Day of August One thousand eight hundred and seventeen, Two Acts of the Fiftieth (Note: Bringing of Coals, etc., to London, etc. Act 1810 (50 Geo. 3. c. 110)) and Forty fifth (Note: Bringing of Coals, etc., to London, etc. Act 1805 (45 Geo. 3. c. 128)) Years of His present Majesty, allowing the bringing of Coals, Culm and Cinders to London and Westminster. (Repealed by Statute Law Revision Act 1873 (36 & 37 Vict. c. 91))
Malicious Damage (Scotland) Act 1816 (repealed)	56 Geo. 3. c. 125	1 July 1816
An act for the more effectual Punishment of Persons riotously destroying or damaging Buildings, Engines and Machinery, used in and about Collieries and other Mines, Waggon Ways, Bridges and other Works, used in conveying and shipping Coals and other Minerals; and for enabling the Owners of such Property to recover Damages for the Injury sustained. (Repealed by Statute Law (Repeals) Act 1973 (c. 39))
Insolvent Debtors (Ireland) Act 1816 (repealed)	56 Geo. 3. c. 126	1 July 1816
An act to amend an Act of the Fifty third Year of His present Majesty, (Note: Insolvent Debtors (Ireland) Act 1813 (53 Geo. 3. c. 138)) for the Relief of Insolvent Debtors in Ireland. (Repealed by Statute Law Revision Act 1873 (36 & 37 Vict. c. 91))
Exportation (No. 4) Act 1816 (repealed)	56 Geo. 3. c. 127	1 July 1816
An act to reduce the Duty on the Exportation from Great Britain of Small Coals of a certain Description. (Repealed by Statute Law Revision Act 1861 (24 & 25 Vict. c. 101))
Marylebone Park Paving, etc. Act 1816 (repealed)	56 Geo. 3. c. 128	1 July 1816
An act to amend Two Acts, made in the Fifty third Year of the Reign of His present Majesty, (Note: New Street Act 1813 (53 Geo. 3. c. 121)) (Note: Marylebone Park Improvement Act 1813 (53 Geo. 3. c. lxii)) for opening a more convenient Communication from Mary le bone Park to Charing Cross; and for paving the Streets to be made in Mary le bone Park; and to enable His Majesty to grant small Portions of Land as Scites for Public Buildings, or to be used as Cemeteries within the Bills of Mortality. (Repealed by Regent's Park, Regent Street, etc. Act 1824 (5 Geo. 4. c. 100))
Workhouse Act 1816 (repealed)	56 Geo. 3. c. 129	1 July 1816
An act to repeal certain Provisions in Local Acts for the Maintenance and Management of the Poor. (Repealed by Poor Law Act 1927 (17 & 18 Geo. 5. c. 14))
Night Poaching Act 1816 (repealed)	56 Geo. 3. c. 130	1 July 1816
An act to repeal an Act made in the Thirty ninth and Fortieth Years of His present Majesty's Reign, (Note: Night Poaching Act 1800 (39 & 40 Geo. 3. c. 50)) intituled "An act to extend the Provisions of an Act made in the Seventeenth Year of the Reign of King George the Second, (Note: Justices Commitment Act 1743 (17 Geo. 2. c. 5)) intituled 'An act to amend and make more effectual the Laws relating to Rogues, Vagabonds and other idle and disorderly Persons; and to Houses of Correction;'" and to make other Provisions in lieu thereof. (Repealed by Night Poaching Act 1817 (57 Geo. 3. c. 90))
Peace Preservation Act 1816 (repealed)	56 Geo. 3. c. 131	1 July 1816
An act to revive and continue, until the Fifteenth Day of June One thousand eight hundred and seventeen, an Act of the Fifty second Year of His present Majesty, for the more effectual Preservation of the Peace, by enforcing the Duties of Watching and Warding. (Repealed by Statute Law Revision Act 1873 (36 & 37 Vict. c. 91))
Windsor Forest Act 1816 (repealed)	56 Geo. 3. c. 132	1 July 1816
An act for enlarging the time for making the Award respecting His Majesty's Allotments under an Act of the Fifty third Year of His present Majesty, (Note: Windsor Forest Act 1813 (53 Geo. 3. c. ?158)) for inclosing Windsor Forest; and for extending the Provisions of the said Act. (Repealed by Wild Creatures and Forest Laws Act 1971 (c. 47))
National Debt Act 1816 (repealed)	56 Geo. 3. c. 133	1 July 1816
An act for making Provision to defray the Annual Charge of any Loan of this Session of Parliament. (Repealed by Statute Law Revision Act 1861 (24 & 25 Vict. c. 101))
Duty on Certain Coals Act 1816 (repealed)	56 Geo. 3. c. 134	1 July 1816
An act for allowing a Drawback of the Duty on Coals consumed in Lead Mines in Cornwall. (Repealed by Drawbacks on Coals, etc. Act 1821 (1 & 2 Geo. 4. c. 67))
Crinan Canal (Scotland) Act 1816 (repealed)	56 Geo. 3. c. 135	1 July 1816
An act for authorizing the Barons of the Court of Exchequer in Scotland to order the Payment of a certain Sum of Money to be applied in completing the Crinan Canal. (Repealed by Statute Law Revision Act 1861 (24 & 25 Vict. c. 101))
Lands of Hertford College Act 1816 (repealed)	56 Geo. 3. c. 136	1 July 1816
An act to enable His Majesty to grant certain Lands, Tenements and Hereditaments, escheated and devolved to His Majesty by the Dissolution of Hertford College, in the University of Oxford, and the Site of the said College and Buildings thereon, to the Chancellor, Masters and Scholars of the said University, in Trust for the Principal and other Members of Magdalen Hall, for the Purpose of their removing to such Site; and to enable the said Chancellor, Masters and Scholars of the said University, and the President and Scholars of Saint Mary Magdalen College, to do all necessary Acts for such Removal. (Repealed by Statute Law (Repeals) Act 1978 (c. 45))
Bankrupts (England) Act 1816 (repealed)	56 Geo. 3. c. 137	2 July 1816
An act to extend the Provisions of an Act of the First Year of the Reign of King James the First, intituled "An act for the better Relief of the Creditors against such as shall become Bankrupts." (Note: Bankrupts Act 1603 (1 Jas. 1. c. 15)) (Repealed by Statute Law Revision Act 1861 (24 & 25 Vict. c. 101))
Pillory Abolition Act 1816 (repealed)	56 Geo. 3. c. 138	2 July 1816
An act to abolish the Punishment of the Pillory, except in certain cases. (Repealed by Statute Law Revision Act 1888 (51 & 52 Vict. c. 3), Criminal Law Act 1967 (c. 58) and Statute Law (Repeals) Act 1973 (c. 39))
Parish Apprentices Act 1816 (repealed)	56 Geo. 3. c. 139	2 July 1816
An act to regulate the binding of Parish Apprentices. (Repealed by Poor Law Act 1927 (17 & 18 Geo. 5. c. 14))
Sikes' Hydrometer Act 1816 (repealed)	56 Geo. 3. c. 140	2 July 1816
An Act for establishing the Use of an Hydrometer, called Sikes's Hydrometer, in ascertaining the Strength of Spirits, instead of Clarke's Hydrometer. (Repealed by Spirits (Strength Ascertainment) Act 1818 (58 Geo. 3. c. 28))
Burial Ground Act 1816	56 Geo. 3. c. 141	2 July 1816
An Act for enabling Ecclesiastical Corporate Bodies under certain Circumstances to alienate Lands for enlarging Cemeteries or Churchyards.
Appropriation Act 1816 (repealed)	56 Geo. 3. c. 142	2 July 1816
An act for granting to His Majesty a certain Sum out of the Consolidated Fund of Great Britain, and for applying certain Monies therein mentioned for the Service of the Year One thousand eight hundred and sixteen; and for further appropriating the Supplies granted in this Session of Parliament. (Repealed by Statute Law Revision Act 1873 (36 & 37 Vict. c. 91))

=== Local acts ===
Short title	Citation	Royal assent
Long title
Chapel on the Heath and Bourton on the Hill Road Act 1816 (repealed)	56 Geo. 3. c. i	22 March 1816
An Act for enlarging the Term and Powers of Two Acts of His present Majesty, (Note: Chapel on the Heath and Bourton on the Hill Road Act 1765 (5 Geo. 3. c. 80)) (Note: Chapel on the Heath and Bourton on the Hill Road Act 1791 (31 Geo. 3. c. 111)) for repairing the Road from Chapel on the Heath, in the County of Oxford, to Bourton on the Hill in the County of Gloucester. (Repealed by Statute Law (Repeals) Act 2013 (c. 2))
Stamford and Kettering, and Oundle and Middleton Roads Act 1816 (repealed)	56 Geo. 3. c. ii	22 March 1816
An Act for enlarging the Term and Powers of an Act of His present Majesty, (Note: Northampton Roads Act 1794 (34 Geo. 3. c. 126)) for repairing the Road from Saint Martin Stamford Baron to Kettering, and from Oundle to Middleton Lane, in the County of Northampton. (Repealed by Stamford and Kettering, and Oundle and Middleton Lane Turnpike Roads Act 1854 (17 & 18 Vict. c. cix))
Chatteris and Ramsey Road Act 1816	56 Geo. 3. c. iii	22 March 1816
An Act for enlarging the Term and Powers of Two Acts of His present Majesty, (Note: Isle of Ely to Ramsey Road Act 1794 (12 Geo. 3. c. 26)) (Note: Isle of Ely to Ramsey Road Act 1794 (34 Geo. 3. c. 127)) so far as the same relate to the Road from Carter's Bridge, in the Parish of Chatteris, within the Isle of Ely, in the County of Cambridge, to the Forty Feet Bridge, in the Parish of Ramsey, in the County of Huntingdon.
Grand Junction Waterworks Company Act 1816	56 Geo. 3. c. iv	28 March 1816
An Act to amend an Act of the Fifty first Year of His present Majesty, (Note: Grand Junction Canal Company and Paddington Water Supply Act 1811 (51 Geo. 3. c. clxix)) for confirming certain Articles of Agreement between the Company of Proprietors of the Grand Junction Canal and certain Persons, for supplying with Water the Inhabitants of the Parish of Paddington, and the Parish es and Streets adjacent, in the County oi Middlesex.
Mitcham Parish Rates Act 1816 (repealed)	56 Geo. 3. c. v	28 March 1816
An Act for the better assessing and collecting the Poor and other Parochial Rates, in the Parish of Mitcham, in the County of Surrey. (Repealed by Statute Law (Repeals) Act 2013 (c. 2))
Road from Dewsbury to Leeds Act 1816 (repealed)	56 Geo. 3. c. vi	28 March 1816
An Act for making and maintaining a Road from Dewsbury to Leeds, in the West Riding of the County of York. (Repealed by Dewsbury and Leeds Road Act 1841 (4 & 5 Vict. c. civ))
Clifton Parish Church and Cemetery Act 1816	56 Geo. 3. c. vii	29 March 1816
An Act for taking down the Parish Church of Clifton, in the County of Gloucester, and for building a new Church, and providing an additional Cemetery for the Use of the said Parish.
Woodford and Ilford Roads Act 1816	56 Geo. 3. c. viii	11 April 1816
An Act to provide for the repairing and maintaining of a certain Part of several Roads or Ways, leading from Woodford to Ilford, in the County of Essex, and for shutting up certain other Parts of the said several Roads or Ways.
Woodford Parish Church and Churchyard Act 1816	56 Geo. 3. c. ix	11 April 1816
An Act for enlarging improving and repairing the Parish Church of Woodford, in the County of Essex, and for enlarging the Church Yard or Burial Ground of the faid Parish.
Exeter Gas Act 1816 (repealed)	56 Geo. 3. c. x	11 April 1816
An Act for lighting with Gas the City and County of the City of Exeter. (Repealed by Exeter Gas Act 1865 (28 & 29 Vict. c. cxx))
Southwark Bridge Act 1816	56 Geo. 3. c. xi	11 April 1816
An Act to amend Two Acts of His present Majesty (Note: Southwark Bridge Act 1811 (51 Geo. 3. c. clxvi)) (Note: Southwark Bridge Act 1813 (53 Geo. 3. c. lxxxvii)) for erecting a Bridge over the River Thames, from the City of London to the opposite Bank in the County of Surrey.
Manchester and Salford Water Act 1816	56 Geo. 3. c. xii	11 April 1816
An Act for altering amending and extending the Powers of Two Acts of His present Majesty's Reign, (Note: Manchester and Salford Water Act 1809 (49 Geo. 3. c. cxcii)) (Note: Manchester and Salford Water Act 1813 (53 Geo. 3. c. xx)) for supplying with Water the Inhabitants of the Towns of Manchester and Salford, in the Parish of Manchester, in the County Palatine of Lancaster.
Royal Circus or Surrey Theatre Act 1816	56 Geo. 3. c. xiii	11 April 1816
An Act to enable Temple West Esquire, sole Proprietor of The Royal Circus or Surrey Theatre, situate in the Parish of Saint George, in the County of Surrey, to continue the same open, for public Amusement, for a limited time.
Preston Candover, Basingstoke and Alton Road Act 1816	56 Geo. 3. c. xiv	11 April 1816
An Act for enlarging the Term and Powers of an Act of His present Majesty; (Note: Preston Candover to Alton Road Act 1795 (35 Geo. 3. c. 138)) for repairing and widening the Road from Preston Candover to Basingstoke, and from thence to Alton, in the County of Southampton.
Nantwich to Wheelock Wharf Turnpike Road Act 1816 (repealed)	56 Geo. 3. c. xv	11 April 1816
An Act for making and maintaining a Turnpike Road from the Town of Nantwich, to Wheelock Wharf, in the Township of Sandbach, in the County Palatine of Chester. (Repealed by Nantwich to Wheelock Wharf Road Act 1848 (11 & 12 Vict. c. xlix))
Stourbridge and Bridgnorth Boundary Stone Road Act 1816 (repealed)	56 Geo. 3. c. xvi	11 April 1816
An Act for making and maintaining a Turnpike Road from the High Street in the Town of Stourbridge, in the County of Worcester, to the Boundary Stone between the Parish of Worfield and the Liberties of the Borough of Bridgnorth, in the County of Salop. (Repealed by Stourbridge and Bridgnorth Road Act 1854 (17 & 18 Vict. c. clxxiii))
Stockport and Bredbury Roads Act 1816 (repealed)	56 Geo. 3. c. xvii	11 April 1816
An Act for more effectually repairing and improving the Road from Stockport, in the County of Chester, to the End of Guide Lane, in the County of Lancaster, and other Roads therein mentioned in the said Counties, and in the County of York; and for making a new Road from the said Road in Bredbury, to the Bridge over the River Mersey at Portwood, near the Town of Stockport. (Repealed by Stockport Road Act 1825 (6 Geo. 4. c. xxvii))
Egham Hill and Bagshot Road Act 1816 (repealed)	56 Geo. 3. c. xviii	11 April 1816
An Act for more effectually repairing the Road from the Twenty Mile Stone on Egham Hill, in the County of Surrey, to a Place called Basingstone, (Note: The Basing Stone was located near the former Jolly Farmer public house, at the junction of the A30 and A325 roads.) near the Town of Bagshot, in the Parish of Windlesham, in the same County. (Repealed by Egham Hill and Bagshot Road Act 1833 (3 & 4 Will. 4. c. xxxviii))
Ayr Gaol and Courthouse Act 1816	56 Geo. 3. c. xix	30 April 1816
An Act for erecting a new Gaol and Court House in the Burgh of Ayr, in the Shire of Ayr.
Highland Society of London Act 1816	56 Geo. 3. c. xx	21 May 1816
An Act for the Incorporation of The Highland Society of London; for the better Management of the Funds of the Society; and for rendering its Exertions more extensive and beneficial to the Public.
Middlesex and Essex Coal Trade Act 1816	56 Geo. 3. c. xxi	21 May 1816
An Act for preventing Frauds in the Admeasurement and Delivery of Coals within the several Parishes in the County of Middlesex, lying between the Parish of Saint Luke Chelsea, and the Mouth of the River Colne, near Staines; and also between Limehouse Hole and the Mouth of the River Lee, near Blackwall; and also within the several Parishes in the Counties of Middlesex and Essex, adjoining to both Banks of the River Lee, and the Branches thereof, between the River Thames and Edmonton.
Porthleven Harbour Act 1816	56 Geo. 3. c. xxii	21 May 1816
An Act for amending and enlarging the Powers of Two Acts of His present Majesty, (Note: Porthleven Harbour Act 1811 (51 Geo. 3. c. cxcv)) (Note: Porthleven Harbour Act 1813 (53 Geo. 3. c. xxxiv)) for constructing an Harbour at Porthleven, in Mount's Bay, in the County of Cornwall.
Hereford Improvement Act 1816 (repealed)	56 Geo. 3. c. xxiii	21 May 1816
An Act to enlarge amend and render more effectual the Provisions of an Act of His present Majesty, (Note: Hereford Streets Act 1774 (14 Geo. 3. c. 38)) for paving and lighting the City of Hereford, and removing Nuisances therein; and for enabling the Corporation of the faid City to sell and apply the Produce of certain Messuages and Lands in establishing Market Places, and otherwise improving the said City. (Repealed by Hereford Improvement Act 1854 (17 & 18 Vict. c. xxxi))
Newry Parish Church Act 1816	56 Geo. 3. c. xxiv	21 May 1816
An Act for enlarging the Term and Powers of an Act of His present Majesty, (Note: Newry Parish Church Act 1811 (51 Geo. 3. c. cc)) for building a Church in and for the Parish of Newry, in the Counties of Down and Armagh.
Cowes Improvement and Market Act 1816	56 Geo. 3. c. xxv	21 May 1816
An Act for paving, lighting, cleansing and otherwise improving the Town of West Cowes, in the Isle of Wight, in the County of Southampton; and for establishing a Market within the said Town.
Melksham Improvement Act 1816 (repealed)	56 Geo. 3. c. xxvi	21 May 1816
An Act for paving and improving the Footways, and for cleansing, lighting and watching the Streets and other Public Passages and Places in the Town of Melksham, in the County of Wilts. (Repealed by Local Government Board's Provisional Orders Confirmation (Blackburn, &c.) Act 1876 (39 & 40 Vict. c. xv))
Woolwich Ferry Act 1816	56 Geo. 3. c. xxvii	21 May 1816
An Act to repeal a certain Part of an Act passed in the last Session of Parliament, intituled "An Act to amend an Act of His present Majesty, for establishing a Ferry across the River Thames at Woolwich, in the County of Kent." (Note: Woolwich Ferry Act 1811 (51 Geo. 3. c. cxcix))
St. George the Martyr Holborn Parish Church Act 1816	56 Geo. 3. c. xxviii	21 May 1816
An Act for repairing and altering the Parish Church of Saint George the Martyr, in the County of Middlesex, and for making further Provision for the Rector of the said Parish.
Peak Forest Railways Act 1816	56 Geo. 3. c. xxix	21 May 1816
An Act for making and maintaining a Railway or Tramroad from Peak Forest to Beard, and from Peak Forest aforesaid, to or near to Woodlands, all in the County of Derby.
Road from Gatton Lodge to Povey Cross Act 1816 (repealed)	56 Geo. 3. c. xxx	21 May 1816
An Act for making and maintaining a Road from near Gatton Lodge, (Note: Gatton, Surrey.) in the County of Surrey, to Povey Cross, (Note: Povey Cross, to the north of Gatwick Airport, on the Surrey/Sussex border. 51°09′52″N 0°11′12″W) in the said County. (Repealed by Statute Law (Repeals) Act 2013 (c. 2))
Leominster Roads Act 1816 (repealed)	56 Geo. 3. c. xxxi	21 May 1816
An Act for continuing the Term and altering and enlarging the Powers of an Act of the Fortieth Year of His present Majesty, (Note: Leominster Roads Act 1800 (39 & 40 Geo. 3. c. lxv)) for improving the Roads leading from the Town of Leominster, in the County of Hereford. (Repealed by Annual Turnpike Acts Continuance Act 1869 (32 & 33 Vict. c. 90))
Gittisham and Sidmouth Road Act 1816 (repealed)	56 Geo. 3. c. xxxii	21 May 1816
An Act for repairing and improving the Road from the Lyme Turnpike Road, in the Parish of Gittisham, to Sidmouth, in the County of Devon. (Repealed by Honiton and Sidmouth Turnpike Road Act 1856 (19 & 20 Vict. c. lx))
Bowes and Sunderland Bridge Road Act 1816	56 Geo. 3. c. xxxiii	21 May 1816
An Act to rectify a Mistake in an Act of the Fifty third Year of His present Majesty, (Note: Bowes and Sunderland Bridge Road Act 1813 (53 Geo. 3. c. xxv)) for repairing the Roads from Bowes, in the County of York, to join the Great North Road, near Sunderland Bridge, in the County of Durham.
Farnborough and Sevenoaks Road Act 1816 (repealed)	56 Geo. 3. c. xxxiv	21 May 1816
An Act for more effectually repairing the Road leading from Farnborough, (Note: Farnborough, Kent.) in the County of Kent, to Riverhill in the Parish of Sevenoaks (Note: Sevenoaks, Kent.) in the said County. (Repealed by Farnborough and Sevenoaks Road Act 1835 (5 & 6 Will. 4. c. xx))
Edinburgh Two Pennies Scots Act 1816 (repealed)	56 Geo. 3. c. xxxv	31 May 1816
An Act for altering and amending several Acts in regard to the Duty of Two Pennies Scots upon every Pint of Ale and Beer sold in the City of Edinburgh and Places adjacent. (Repealed by Statute Law (Repeals) Act 2013 (c. 2))
Borrowstounness Two Pennies Scots Act 1816 (repealed)	56 Geo. 3. c. xxxvi	31 May 1816
An Act to continue the Term and enlarge the Powers of several Acts for imposing and continuing a Duty of Two Pennies Scots, or the Sixth Part of a Penny Sterling, upon every Scots Pint of Ale and Beer which shall be brewed for Sale, brought into, tapped or sold within the Town of Borrowestowness and Liberties thereof, in the County of Linlithgow, and for extending the same over the Parish of Borrowestowness; for repairing the Harbour of the said Town; and for other Purposes therein mentioned. (Repealed by Borrowstounness Town and Harbour Act 1875 (38 & 39 Vict. c. cxxxvii))
Montrose Two Pennies Scots Act 1816 (repealed)	56 Geo. 3. c. xxxvii	31 May 1816
An Act for enlarging the Term and Powers of several Acts for laying a Duty of Two Pennies Scots, or One Sixth Part of a Penny Sterling, upon every Pint of Ale or Beer vended or sold within the Town of Montrose, and Privileges thereof; for supplying the said Town with Fresh Water; and for other Purposes therein mentioned. (Repealed by Statute Law (Repeals) Act 2013 (c. 2))
Eau Brink Act 1816 or the Bedford Level Drainage and Ouse Navigation Act 1816 (repealed)	56 Geo. 3. c. xxxviii	31 May 1816
An Act for amending several Acts of His present Majesty, for improving the Drainage of the Middle and South Levels, Part of the Great Level of the Fens called Bedford Level, and Other Lands therein mentioned; and for improving the Navigation of the River Ouze, in the County of Norfolk, and of the several Rivers communicating therewith. (Repealed by Ouse Outfall Act 1860 (23 & 24 Vict. c. lxxxviii))
St. Pancras Parish Church and Parochial Chapel Act 1816 (repealed)	56 Geo. 3. c. xxxix	31 May 1816
An Act for building a new Parish Church and a Parochial Chapel in the Parish of Saint Pancras, in the County of Middlesex, and for other Purposes relating thereto. (Repealed by St. Pancras Ecclesiastical Regulation Act 1868 (31 & 32 Vict. c. clx))
Huddersfield Parish Church Act 1816	56 Geo. 3. c. xl	31 May 1816
An Act for building a Church or Chapel of Ease in the Parish of Huddersfield, in the West Riding of the County of York.
Edinburgh Improvement Act 1816	56 Geo. 3. c. xli	31 May 1816
An Act to enable the Lord Provost, Magistrates and Council of the City of Edinburgh to carry into effect certain Purposes in regard to the Erection of a Chapel (Note: St John's, Edinburgh.) at the West End of Prince's Street, and for effecting certain Improvements in the Neighbourhood thereof, and in other Parts of the extended Royalty of the said City.
Edinburgh Gaol Act 1816	56 Geo. 3. c. xlii	31 May 1816
An Act to alter and amend Two Acts of the Fifty third (Note: Edinburgh Gaol Act 1813 (53 Geo. 3. c. lxxvii)) and Fifty fourth (Note: Edinburgh Gaol, Offices, Low Calton Bridge and Improvements Act 1814 (54 Geo. 3. c. clxx)) Years of His present Majesty, for erecting and maintaining a new Gaol and other Buildings for the County and City of Edinburgh; and to alter and amend Two Acts of the Forty third (Note: Roads in Edinburgh Act 1803 (43 Geo. 3. c. xxxiv)) and Forty ninth (Note: Roads in Edinburgh Act 1809 (49 Geo. 3. c. xxxvii)) Years of His present Majesty, in regard to the Statute Labour of the Middle District of the said County.
Keighley Water Act 1816	56 Geo. 3. c. xliii	31 May 1816
An Act for supplying with Water the Inhabitants of the Town of Keighly, in the West Riding of the County of York.
Whitehaven Improvement Act 1816	56 Geo. 3. c. xliv	31 May 1816
An Act for altering and enlarging the Powers of several Acts (Note: Whitehaven Harbour Act 1708 (7 Ann. c. 9)) (Note: Whitehaven Harbour Act 1711 (10 Ann. c. 17)) (Note: Whitehaven Harbour Improvement Act 1739 (13 Geo. 2. c. 14)) (Note: Whitehaven Improvement Act 1760 (1 Geo. 3. c. 44)) (Note: Whitehaven Improvement Act 1762 (2 Geo. 3. c. 87)) (Note: Whitehaven Improvement Act 1788 (28 Geo. 3. c. 61)) (Note: Whitehaven Improvement Act 1792 (32 Geo. 3. c. 75)) (Note: Whitehaven Improvement Act 1806 (46 Geo. 3. c. cxv)) passed for improving the Port, Harbour and Town of Whitehaven, in the County of Cumberland; and for better supplying the said Town with Water.
Upper Smithfield Improvement Act 1816 (repealed)	56 Geo. 3. c. xlv	31 May 1816
An Act for altering, amending and explaining Two Acts of His present Majesty's Reign, (Note: St. Botolph without Aldgate Improvement Act 1812 (52 Geo. 3. c. cxlix)) (Note: Upper East Smithfield Improvement Act 1813 (53 Geo. 3. c. lxxii)) for widening and improving the Street leading from Tower Hill to the Street called Upper East Smithfield, in the County of Middlesex. (Repealed by London Government (Borough of Stepney) Order in Council 1901 (SR&O 1901/276))
Worcester (City) Roads Act 1816 (repealed)	56 Geo. 3. c. xlvi	31 May 1816
An Act for the better repairing the several Roads leading into and from the City of Worcester. (Repealed by Worcester (City) Turnpike Roads Act 1835 (5 & 6 Will. 4. c. lxiii))
Aldermaston and Basingstoke Road Act 1816	56 Geo. 3. c. xlvii	31 May 1816
An Act for enlarging the Term and Powers of Two Acts of His present Majesty, (Note: Berkshire and Southampton Roads Act 1772 (12 Geo. 3. c. 78)) (Note: Berkshire and Southampton Roads Act 1794 (34 Geo. 3. c. 141)) for repairing and widening the Road from Aldermaston to Basingstoke, and several other Roads therein mentioned, in the Counties of Berks and Southampton.
Road from Dudley Hill and from Beckwithshaw Act 1816 (repealed)	56 Geo. 3. c. xlviii	31 May 1816
An Act for amending the Road from Dudley Hill through Beckwithshaw to Killinghall, and from Beckwithshaw to the South weft Corner of Harrogate Inclosures, and for making and maintaining a Branch therefrom to Bradford, all in the West Riding of the County of York. (Repealed by Junction Road between Dudley Hill and Killinghall Road and Leeds and Harrogate Turnpike Road Act 1838 (1 & 2 Vict. c. xciv))
Darlaston Turnpike Act 1816 or the Roads from Darlaston Bridge Act 1816 (repealed)	56 Geo. 3. c. xlix	31 May 1816
An Act for enlarging the Term and Powers of Two Acts of His present Majesty, (Note: Darlaston Turnpike Act 1779 (19 Geo. 3. c. 119)) (Note: Darlaston Turnpike Act Act 1791 (31 Geo. 3. c. 129)) for repairing the Road from Darlastone Bridge to the most Northern Part of Talk-on-the-Hill in Butt Lane, in the County of Stafford, and also the Road branching out of the said first mentioned Road to Shelton Wharf, in the said County. (Repealed by Darlaston Turnpike Act 1823 (4 Geo. 4. c. xxx))
Road from Edinburgh to Lanark Act 1816 (repealed)	56 Geo. 3. c. l	31 May 1816
An Act for altering and amending an Act of the Forty-fifth Year of His present Majesty, (Note: Road from Edinburgh to Lanark Act 1805 (45 Geo. 3. c. xxii)) for making and maintaining a Road leading from the Limits of the Counties of Edinburgh and Lanark, into the Burgh of Lanark, with a Branch towards Ravenstruther, in the County of Lanark. (Repealed by Road from Edinburgh to Lanark Act 1840 (3 & 4 Vict. c. ciii))
Birmingham and High Bullen Roads Act 1816 (repealed)	56 Geo. 3. c. li	31 May 1816
An Act for enlarging the Term and Powers of several Acts, (Note: Birmingham and Wednesbury Roads Act 1726 (13 Geo. 1. c. 14)) (Note: Warwick, Stafford and Worcester Roads Act 1772 (21 Geo. 2. c. 20)) (Note: Warwick, Stafford and Worcester Roads Act 1772 (12 Geo. 3. c. 110)) (Note: Warwick Worcester and Stafford Roads Act 1787 (27 Geo. 3. c. 73)) so far as the same relate to the Roads from Birmingham through Wednesbury, to High Bullen, and other Roads therein mentioned, in the Counties of Warwick, Worcester and Stafford. (Repealed by Birmingham and Wednesbury Roads Act 1832 (2 & 3 Will. 4. c. vi))
Biggleswade and Alconbury Hill Road Act 1816	56 Geo. 3. c. lii	31 May 1816
An Act for more effectually repairing the Road from Biggleswade to Alconbury Hill, and other Roads therein mentioned, in the Counties of Bedford and Huntingdon.
Shrewsbury and Overton Roads (Ellesmere District) Act 1816 (repealed)	56 Geo. 3. c. liii	31 May 1816
An Act for continuing the Term, and altering and enlarging the Powers of several Acts, (Note: Shrewsbury and Wrexham Road Act 1751 (25 Geo. 2. c. 22)) (Note: Denbigh Roads Act 1788 (29 Geo. 2. c. 93)) (Note: Denbigh Roads Act 1788 (28 Geo. 3. c. 112)) passed for repairing the Roads from Shrewsbury through Ellesmere in the County of Salop, and Overton in the County of Flint, to Wrexham in the County of Denbigh, and other Roads in the said Acts mentioned, so far as relates to the Ellesmere District of the said Roads. (Repealed by Shrewsbury, Ellesmere and Wrexham Road Act 1838 (1 & 2 Vict. c. xvii))
St. James Westminster Poor Relief Act 1816 (repealed)	56 Geo. 3. c. liv	20 June 1816
An Act to amend an Act of the Second Year of His present Majesty, (Note: St. James, Westminster (Poor Relief, etc.) Act 1762 (2 Geo. 3. c. 58)) for the better Relief and Employment of the Poor of the Parish of Saint James, within the Liberty of Westminster, and another Act of the First Year of King James the Second, (Note: St. James' Parish, Westminster Act 1685 (1 Ja. 2. c. 10 Pr.)) for erecting the said Parish. (Repealed by London Government (City of Westminster) Order in Council 1901 (SR&O 1901/278))
St. Saviour's Southwark Parochial Rates Act 1816 (repealed)	56 Geo. 3. c. lv	20 June 1816
An Act to enlarge the Powers of an Act passed in the Twenty-second and Twenty-third Years of the Reign of His Majesty King Charles the Second, (Note: Christ Church and St. Saviour's Parishes Southwark Act 1670 (22 & 23 Cha. 2. c. 28 Pr.)) for making the Manor of Paris Garden a Parish, and to enable the Parishioners of Saint Saviour's Southwark to raise a Maintenance for Ministers, and for Repairs of their Church; and for other Purposes relating thereto. (Repealed by St. Saviour's Southwark (Church Rate Abolition) Act 1883 (46 & 47 Vict. c. xi))
St. George the Martyr Southwark Churchyard Act 1816 (repealed)	56 Geo. 3. c. lvi	20 June 1816
An Act for enlarging the Church Yard of the Parish of Saint George the Martyr, in Southwark, in the County of Surrey; and for other Purposes relating thereto. (Repealed by London Government (Borough of Southwark) Order in Council 1901 (SR&O 1901/275))
Belfast Improvement Act 1816 (repealed)	56 Geo. 3. c. lvii	20 June 1816
An Act to explain and amend an Act of His present Majesty, (Note: Belfast Improvement Act 1800 (40 Geo. 3. c. 37 (I))) for paving, cleansing, lighting and otherways improving the Town of Belfast, in the County of Antrim, and for better effecting those Purposes. (Repealed by Belfast Improvement Act 1845 (8 & 9 Vict. c. cxlii))
Crowle and Althorpe Inclosures and Drainage Act 1816	56 Geo. 3. c. lviii	20 June 1816
An Act for amending an Act of His present Majesty, intituled "An Act for inclosing Lands in the Townships of Crowle, Eastoft, and Ealand, in the Parish of Crowle, in the County of Lincoln, and extending into the West Riding of the County of York;" (Note: Crowle, Eastoft and Ealand Inclosures Act 1813 (53 Geo. 3. c. clxxvii)) and for draining or warping the said Lands, and Lands in the Parishes of Luddingdon, Belton, and Adlingfleet, and for making Drains in the Parish of Althorpe; all in the said Counties of Lincoln and York.
Bristol Gaol Act 1816 (repealed)	56 Geo. 3. c. lix	20 June 1816
An Act for building a new Gaol in the City of Bristol, and for other Purposes. (Repealed by Statute Law (Repeals) Act 2008 (c. 12))
Bridlington Piers Act 1816 (repealed)	56 Geo. 3. c. lx	20 June 1816
An Act for continuing the Term, and altering and enlarging the Powers of several Acts (Note: Bridlington Piers Act 1696 (8 & 9 Will. 3. c. 29)) (Note: Bridlington Pier Act 1715 (1 Geo. 1. St. 2. c. 49)) (Note: Bridlington Piers Act 1718 (5 Geo. 1. c. 10)) (Note: Bridlington Piers Act 1720 (7 Geo. 1. St. 1. c. 16)) (Note: Bridlington Piers Act 1753 (26 Geo. 2. c. 10)) (Note: Bridlington Pier Act 1789 (29 Geo. 3. c. 23)) passed for rebuilding and repairing the Piers of Bridlington otherwise Burlington, in the East Riding of the County of York; and for granting further Powers for those Purposes. (Repealed by Bridlington Piers and Harbour Act 1837 (7 Will. 4 & 1 Vict. c. cx))
Rochdale Water Act 1816 (repealed)	56 Geo. 3. c. lxi	20 June 1816
An Act for amending and enlarging the Provisions of an Act of the Forty-ninth Year of His present Majesty, (Note: Rochdale Water Act 1809 (49 Geo. 3. c. xxv)) for better supplying the Inhabitants of the Town of Rochdale and the Neigh bourhood with Water. (Repealed by Rochdale Water Act 1839 (2 & 3 Vict. c. xxiv))
Strangeways Bridge (Manchester) and Approaches Act 1816	56 Geo. 3. c. lxii	20 June 1816
An Act for building a Bridge across the River Irwell, from the Township of Salford, in the Parish of Manchester, to Strangeways, in the Township of Cheetham, all in the County of Lancaster; and for making proper Avenues thereto.
Waterloo Bridge and Approaches Act 1816 (repealed)	56 Geo. 3. c. lxiii	20 June 1816
An Act for altering and enlarging the Powers of Two Acts of His present Majesty, (Note: Strand Bridge Act 1809 (49 Geo. 3. c. cxci)) (Note: Strand Bridge Act 1813 (53 Geo. 3. c. clxxxiv)) for building a Bridge over the River Thames, from the Precinct of the Savoy, or near thereunto, in the County of Middlesex, to the opposite Shore; and for making convenient Roads and Avenues to communicate therewith in the County of Surrey; and also for making a new Road in lieu of Part of the Road or Street called Narrow Wall, in the said County of Surrey; and for making an Archway over Part of such new Road; and for denominating the said Bridge The Waterloo Bridge. (Repealed by Local Law (Greater London Council and Inner London Boroughs) Order 1965 (SI 1965/540))
Waterford Harbour Act 1816 (repealed)	56 Geo. 3. c. lxiv	20 June 1816
An Act for improving the Port and Harbour of Waterford, and for other Purposes relating thereto. (Repealed by Waterford Harbour Act 1846 (9 & 10 Vict. c. ccxcii))
St. Mark's Church, Liverpool Act 1816	56 Geo. 3. c. lxv	20 June 1816
An Act for establishing a New Church, called the Church of Saint Mark, situate in the Town and Parish of Liverpool, in the County Palatine of Lancaster.
Shardlow and Wilne Poor Relief Act 1816 (repealed)	56 Geo. 3. c. lxvi	20 June 1816
An Act for the better Relief and more effectually employing the Poor of the Township of Shardlow and Wilne, in the County of Derby, and the several Parishes and Places therein mentioned in the said County, and in the Counties of Leicester and Nottingham. (Repealed by Statute Law (Repeals) Act 2013 (c. 2))
Road from Bromsgrove to Dudley Act 1816 (repealed)	56 Geo. 3. c. lxvii	20 June 1816
An Act for enlarging the Term and Powers of certain Acts (Note: Bromsgrove and Birmingham Roads Act 1726 (13 Geo. 1. c. 15)) (Note: Worcester and Warwick Roads Act 1741 (15 Geo. 2. c. 7)) (Note: Worcester and Warwick Roads Act 1773 (13 Geo. 3. c. 106)) (Note: Worcester and Warwick Roads Act 1794 (34 Geo. 3. c. 136)) for repairing several Roads in the Counties of Worcester and Warwick, so far as relate to the Road leading from the Town of Bromsgrove to the Town of Dudley, in the County of Worcester, and for making a more commodious Road near the Town of Dudley. (Repealed by Dudley, Halesowen and Bromsgrove Road Act 1854 (17 & 18 Vict. c. cv))
Norwich and Thetford Road Act 1816 (repealed)	56 Geo. 3. c. lxviii	20 June 1816
An Act for enlarging the Term and Powers of several Acts, (Note: Norfolk Roads Act 1695 (7 & 8 Will. 3. c. 26)) (Note: Norfolk Highways Act 1708 (7 Ann. c. 8)) (Note: Norwich and Thetford Road Act 1725 (12 Geo. 1. c. 22)) (Note: Norwich and Thetford Road Act 1746 (20 Geo. 2. c. 16)) (Note: Norfolk Roads Act 1766 (7 Geo. 3. c. 76)) (Note: Norwich to Thetford Road Act 1792 (32 Geo. 3. c. 111)) for amending the Road from the End of the Town Close, in the County of the City of Norwich, to the Chalk Pits near Thetford, in the County of Norfolk. (Repealed by Statute Law (Repeals) Act 2008 (c. 12))
Roads from Derby to Sheffield and from Duffield to Wirksworth Act 1816 (repealed)	56 Geo. 3. c. lxix	20 June 1816
An Act for continuing the Term and altering and enlarging the Powers of several Acts of His late and present Majesty, (Note: Derby and Sheffield Roads Act 1756 (29 Geo. 2. c. 82)) (Note: Derby and Yorks Roads Act 1776 (16 Geo. 3. c. 73)) (Note: Derby Roads Act 1795 (35 Geo. 3. c. 154)) for repairing the Road from the North End of the Town of Derby, in the County of Derby, to Sheffield, in the County of York, and from Duffield to Wirksworth, in the County of Derby. (Repealed by Derby, Duffield, Wirksworth and Sheffield Turnpike Road Act 1851 (14 & 15 Vict. c. xxxvii))
Argyllshire and Dumbartonshire Roads, Bridges and Quays Act 1816 (repealed)	56 Geo. 3. c. lxx	20 June 1816
An Act for making and maintaining Highways, Roads, Bridges and Quays, and for regulating Ferries in the Shire of Argyll; and for altering and repairing certain Military and other Roads, Bridges and Quays in the said Shire, and in the Parish of Arrochar, and Shire of Dumbarton. (Repealed by Argyllshire Roads, Bridges and Quays Act 1843 (6 & 7 Vict. c. xcvii))
Dublin and Howth Turnpike Road Act 1816 (repealed)	56 Geo. 3. c. lxxi	20 June 1816
An Act for altering and improving Part of the Turnpike Road, leading from the City of Dublin, to the New Packet Harbour of Howth, for the Conveyance of His Majesty's Mails; and for amending the several Laws (Note: Dublin to Malahide Road Act 1786 (26 Geo. 3. c. 30 (I))) (Note: Dublin to Clontarf Road Act 1788 (28 Geo. 3. c. 48 (I))) (Note: Roads in Dublin Act 1789 (29 Geo. 3. c. 24 (I))) (Note: Roads in Dublin Act 1791 (31 Geo. 3. c. 50 (I))) (Note: Dublin to Malahide Road Act 1792 (32 Geo. 3. c. 37 (I))) (Note: Dublin and Malahide Road Act 1793 (33 Geo. 3. c. 26 (I))) (Note: Dublin Bridge Tolls Act 1798 (38 Geo. 3. c. 41 (I))) (Note: Highways (Ireland) Act 1805 (45 Geo. 3. c. 43)) (Note: Highways (Ireland) (No. 2) Act 1806 (46 Geo. 3. c. 134)) relating to the said Road. (Repealed by Dublin and other Roads Turnpikes Abolition Act 1855 (18 & 19 Vict. c. 69))
Luton to Westwood Gate and Luton to St. Albans Roads Act 1816 (repealed)	56 Geo. 3. c. lxxii	20 June 1816
An Act for continuing and amending Four Acts (Note: Luton and Saint Albans Road Act 1726 (13 Geo. 1. c. 17)) (Note: Luton and Saint Albans Road Act 1742 (16 Geo. 2. c. 23)) (Note: Bedford and Hertford Roads Act 1743 (17 Geo. 2. c. 42)) (Note: Bedford and Hereford Roads Act 1775 (15 Geo. 3. c. 72)) (Note: Bedford and Hertford Roads Act 1795 (35 Geo. 3. c. 163)) passed in the Reigns of their late Majesties King George the First and King George the Second, and of His present Majesty, for repairing the Roads from Luton to Westwood Gate, in the County of Bedford, and from Luton to Saint Albans, in the County of Hertford. (Repealed by Luton District Road Act 1856 (19 & 20 Vict. c. cviii))
Customs Annuity and Benevolent Fund Act 1816	56 Geo. 3. c. lxxiii	22 June 1816
An Act for establishing and regulating a Fund for the Widows, Children and Relatives of Officers or Persons belonging to the Department of Customs in England.
Edinburgh Police Act 1816	56 Geo. 3. c. lxxiv	22 June 1816
An Act for amending an Act of the Fifty second Year of His present Majesty (Note: Edinburgh Police Act 1812 (52 Geo. 3. c. clxxii)) for regulating the Police of the City of Edinburgh and the adjoining Districts, and for other Purposes relating thereto.
Borrowstouness Roads Act 1816	56 Geo. 3. c. lxxv	24 June 1816
An Act for more effectually repairing and maintaining the Road from Borrowstounness by the West of Linlithgow, and by Torphichen, Bathgate and Whiteburn, to the Confines of the County of Linlithgow, at or near Hollhouseburn; and for making and maintaining a certain Road from Borrowstounness to the River Avon.
Bristol Court of Requests Act 1816 (repealed)	56 Geo. 3. c. lxxvi	25 June 1816
An Act for the more speedy and easy Recovery of Small Debts, in the City and County of the City of Bristol, and the Liberties thereof, and in the several Parishes and Places therein mentioned, in the Counties of Gloucester and Somerset. (Repealed by County Courts Act 1846 (9 & 10 Vict. c. 95))
Gravesend and Milton Improvement Act 1816	56 Geo. 3. c. lxxvii	26 June 1816
An Act for altering and enlarging the Powers of an Act of the Thirteenth Year of His present Majesty, (Note: Gravesend Streets Act 1772 (13 Geo. 3. c. 15)) for improving the Town and Parishes of Gravesend and Milton, in the County of Kent and for the better Assessment and Collection of the Poor Rates and other Rates within the Parish of Gravesend.
Kent Coal Trade Act 1816 (repealed)	56 Geo. 3. c. lxxviii	26 June 1816
An Act for preventing Frauds in the Admeasurement and Delivery of Coals within the several Parishes lying contiguous to the Water Side in the County of Kent. (Repealed by Kent Coal Trade (Frauds Prevention) Act 1817 (57 Geo. 3. c. xlii))
Road from Horseley Upright Gate to Kingsdown Hill Act 1816 (repealed)	56 Geo. 3. c. lxxix	26 June 1816
An Act for continuing the Term, and altering and enlarging the Powers, of an Act of the Thirty fifth Year of His present Majesty, (Note: Wiltshire Roads Act 1795 (35 Geo. 3. c. 136)) for repairing the Road from Horsely Upright Gate, leading down Bowden Hill, in the County of Wilts, to the Top of Kingsdown Hill, in the Parish of Box, in the said County, and several other Roads near or adjoining thereto. (Repealed by Blue Vein and Bricker's Barn Turnpike Roads (Wiltshire, Somerset) Act 1829 (10 Geo. 4. c. lxxxiii))
Speenhamland Roads Act 1816	56 Geo. 3. c. lxxx	26 June 1816
An Act to continue the Term, and alter and enlarge the Powers of several Acts of His present Majesty's Reign, (Note: Berkshire and Wiltshire Roads Act 1793 (10 Geo. 3. c. 100)) (Note: Berkshire and Wiltshire Roads Act 1793 (33 Geo. 3. c. 138)) (Note: Speenhamland and Marlborough Road Act 1814 (54 Geo. 3. c. ccx)) for repairing the Highways from Speenhamland, in the County of Berks, to Marlborough, in the County of Wilts, and other Roads therein mentioned, so far as relates to the Speenhamland District of the said Roads.
Shoreham Harbour Act 1816 (repealed)	56 Geo. 3. c. lxxxi	1 July 1816
An Act for the more effectual Security and Improvement of the Harbour of New Shoreham, in the County of Sussex. (Repealed by Shoreham Harbour Act 1926 (16 & 17 Geo. 5. c. xlvii))
St. Pancras Improvement Act 1816 (repealed)	56 Geo. 3. c. lxxxii	1 July 1816
An Act to amend an Act passed in the Fifty fourth Year of the Reign of His present Majesty, (Note: St. Pancras Improvement Act 1814 (54 Geo. 3. c. clxxiii)) for Paving, Lighting, Watching otherwise improving the several Streets and other Public upon certain Lands near Battle Bridge, in the Parish of Saint Pancras, in the County of Middlesex. (Repealed by London Government (Borough of St. Pancras) Order in Council 1901 (SR&O 1901/274))
Glasgow and Carlisle Road Improvement Act 1816 (repealed)	56 Geo. 3. c. lxxxiii	1 July 1816
An Act for improving the Road from the City of Glasgow to the City of Carlisle. (Repealed by Statute Law (Repeals) Act 1977 (c. 18))
Court of Chancery Act 1816 (repealed)	56 Geo. 3. c. lxxxiv	2 July 1816
An Act for creaking Buildings for the Accommodation of the Court of Chancery. (Repealed by Statute Law (Repeals) Act 2008 (c. 12))
Regent's Canal Act 1816	56 Geo. 3. c. lxxxv	2 July 1816
An Act for altering and amending an Act made in the Fifty-second Year of His Present Majesty, (Note: Regent's Canal Act 1812 (52 Geo. 3. c. cxcv)) for making a Canal from the Grand Junction Canal in the Parish of Paddington, to the River Thames in the Parish of Limehouse.
Dublin, Ratoath and Curragha Roads Act 1816 (repealed)	56 Geo. 3. c. lxxxvi	2 July 1816
An Act to alter and enlarge the Powers of several Acts passed in the Parliament of Ireland, (Note: Dublin and Ratoath Road Act 1795 (35 Geo. 3. c. 47 (I))) (Note: Road from Dublin to Ratoath Act 1797 (37 Geo. 3. c. 29 (I))) (Note: Dublin and Ratoath Road Act 1799 (39 Geo. 3. c. 46 (I))) for repairing and improving the Roads leading from the City of Dublin to Ratoath and Curragha. (Repealed by Dublin, Slane and Drogheda Road Act 1827 (7 & 8 Geo. 4. c. lxvi))
Metropolis Gas Act 1816 (repealed)	56 Geo. 3. c. lxxxvii	2 July 1816
An Act to alter and enlarge the Powers of Two Acts of His Present Majesty, (Note: Gas Light and Coke Company Act 1810 (50 Geo. 3. c. clxiii)) (Note: Gas Light and Coke Company Act 1814 (54 Geo. 3. c. cxvi)) for granting certain Powers to the Gas Light and Coke Company. (Repealed by Gaslight and Coke Company's Act 1868 (31 & 32 Vict. c. cvi))

=== Private acts ===
Short title	Citation	Royal assent
Long title
Alwinton Allotment Act 1816	56 Geo. 3. c. 1 Pr.	4 March 1816
An Act for allotting Lands in the Parish of Alwinton, in the County of Northumberland.
Moore Inclosure Act 1816	56 Geo. 3. c. 2 Pr.	22 March 1816
An Act for inclosing the Common or Waste Ground, called Halton Moss or Moore Moss, within the Manor and Township of Moore, in the County Palatine of Chester.
Blidworth Inclosure Act 1816	56 Geo. 3. c. 3 Pr.	11 April 1816
An Act for ratifying and confirming certain Exchanges made under an Act of the Forty fifth Year of the Reign of His present Majesty, (Note: Blidworth Inclosure Act 1805 (45 Geo. 3. c. 32 Pr.)) for inclosing Lands in the Parish of Blidworth, in the County of Nottingham.
Thorp Arch, &c. Inclosure Act 1816	56 Geo. 3. c. 4 Pr.	11 April 1816
An Act for inclosing Lands in the Parishes of Thorp Arch and Walton, in the County of the City of York.
Newburn Inclosure Act 1816	56 Geo. 3. c. 5 Pr.	11 April 1816
An Act for inclosing Lands in the Parish of Newburn, in the County of Northumberland.
Heaton Inclosure Act 1816	56 Geo. 3. c. 6 Pr.	11 April 1816
An Act for inclosing Lands in the Manor and Township of Heaton, in the Parish of Leek, in the County of Stafford.
Ripon Inclosure Act 1816	56 Geo. 3. c. 7 Pr.	11 April 1816
An Act for inclosing Lands in the Parish of Ripon, in the County of York.
Grantham Grammar School Act 1816	56 Geo. 3. c. 8 Pr.	21 May 1816
An Act for vesting several Messuages, Lands and Hereditaments belonging to the Free Grammar School of King Edward the Sixth, in the Town or Borough of Grantham, in Trustees to be sold; and for applying the Money to arise by such Sale in the Purchase of other Lands and Hereditaments, to be fettled upon the Trusts on which such Messuages, Lands and Hereditaments are held.
Westbourn Farm Estate Act 1816	56 Geo. 3. c. 9 Pr.	21 May 1816
An Act for confirming and effectuating a Partition of a Messuage, Farm and Lands, called Westbourn, otherwise Westbury Farm, in the Parishes of Paddington, Kensington and Chelsea, or some or one of them, in the County of Middlesex, in which the Very Reverend William Beaumont Busby Doctor in Divinity, and William Hervey Esquire, have undivided Moieties.
Ecchinswell Inclosure Act 1816	56 Geo. 3. c. 10 Pr.	21 May 1816
An Act for inclosing Lands in the Manor of Ecchinswell, and especially within the Tything of East Woodhay, otherwise Wydhey, in the County of Southampton.
St. Michael's Tithes Act 1816	56 Geo. 3. c. 11 Pr.	21 May 1816
An Act to commute for a Corn Rent the Tithes and Dues payable to the Vicar of the Parish and Parish Church of Saint Michael upon Wyre, in the County Palatine of Lancaster.
Lowther's Estate Act 1816	56 Geo. 3. c. 12 Pr.	31 May 1816
An Act for effecting an Exchange of an Estate devised by the Will of the Reverend Henry Zouch for an Estate belonging to John Lowther Esquire, in Fee Simple.
Bishop of Bristol's Estate Act 1816	56 Geo. 3. c. 13 Pr.	31 May 1816
An Act for vesting certain Estates in the Parish of Leeds, in the County of York, Part of the Estates devised by the Will of Christopher late Lord Bishop of Bristol, in Trustees, to be sold, and for laying out the Money arising by such Sale in the Purchase of other Estates to be settled to the same Uses.
Aldersey's Estate Act 1816	56 Geo. 3. c. 14 Pr.	31 May 1816
An Act for vesting Parts of the settled Estates of Samuel Aldersey Esquire, in the County of Chester, in a Trustee, to be sold; and for purchasing other Estates, to be settled to the same Uses.
Borwick Inclosure Act 1816	56 Geo. 3. c. 15 Pr.	31 May 1816
An Act for inclosing Lands in the Township of Borwick and Parish of Warton, in the County Palatine of Lancaster.
Alton Inclosure Act 1816	56 Geo. 3. c. 16 Pr.	31 May 1816
An Act for inclosing Lands in the Hamlet of Alton, in the Parish of Rock, in the County of Worcester.
Wellington Inclosure Act 1816	56 Geo. 3. c. 17 Pr.	31 May 1816
An Act for inclosing Lands in the Parish of Wellington, in the County of Somerset.
Askrigg Inclosure Act 1816	56 Geo. 3. c. 18 Pr.	31 May 1816
An Act for inclosing Lands in the Manor of Askrigg, in the Parish of Aisgarth and County of York.
Holmesfield Inclosure Act 1816	56 Geo. 3. c. 19 Pr.	31 May 1816
An Act for inclosing Land in the Hamlet of Homesfield, in the Parish of Dronfield, in the County of Derby.
Briestwistle Inclosure Act 1816	56 Geo. 3. c. 20 Pr.	31 May 1816
An Ad for inclosing Lands in the Manor of Briestwistle, in the Parish of Thornhill, in the West Riding of the County of York.
Church Stretton, &c. Inclosure Act 1816	56 Geo. 3. c. 21 Pr.	31 May 1816
An Act for inclosing Lands in the Parishes of Church Stretton, Wistanstow and Edgton, in the County of Salop.
Londesborough Inclosure Act 1816	56 Geo. 3. c. 22 Pr.	31 May 1816
An Act for inclosing Lands in the Manor and Parish of Londesborough, in the East Riding of the County of York.
Whiston Inclosure Act 1816	56 Geo. 3. c. 23 Pr.	31 May 1816
An Act for inclosing Lands in the Parish of Whiston, in the County of York.
Stainland Inclosure Act 1816	56 Geo. 3. c. 24 Pr.	31 May 1816
An Act for inclosing Lands in the Manor of Stainland, in the Parish of Halifax, in the County of York.
Saggart Inclosure Act 1816	56 Geo. 3. c. 25 Pr.	31 May 1816
An Act for inclosing Lands within the Parish of Saggart, in the County of Dublin.
West Sedgemoor Inclosure Act 1816	56 Geo. 3. c. 26 Pr.	31 May 1816
An Act for inclosing West Sedgmoor, in the County of Somerset.
Feckenham Inclosure Act 1816	56 Geo. 3. c. 27 Pr.	31 May 1816
An Act for inclosing Lands in the Parish of Feckenham, in the County of Worcester.
Earl of Rosebery's Estate Act 1816	56 Geo. 3. c. 28 Pr.	20 June 1816
An Act for selling certain Lands and Heritages in the Shire of Berwick, entailed by Neil late Earl of Roseberry, deceased, for Payment of the Balance of the Price of certain other Lands purchased and entailed by him; and for purchasing and entailing other Lands more convenient to the Family Estates.
Hyde's Estate Act 1816	56 Geo. 3. c. 29 Pr.	20 June 1816
An Act for vesting certain Estates devised by the Will of Nathan Hyde Esquire, deceased, in Trustees, in Trust to be sold, and for laying out the Monies arising from such Sales in the Purchase of other Estates, to be settled to the same Uses as the Estates so sold.
Coburn's Charity Act 1816	56 Geo. 3. c. 30 Pr.	20 June 1816
An Act for making the Trustees of Prisca Coborn's Charity a Body Corporate, and for enabling them to sell Part of the Estates belonging to the said Charity, and to apply the Money arising therefrom in manner therein mentioned, and to grant Building Leases of other Part of the Estates belonging to the said Charity, and to appoint new Trustees of such of the Copyhold Estates belonging to the said Charity as are not to be sold.
Great Birch Rectory Act 1816	56 Geo. 3. c. 31 Pr.	20 June 1816
An Act for uniting the Rectory of Great Birch, in the County of Essex, with the adjoining Rectory of Little Birch, in the same County, after the next Avoidance of either Benefice.
Dean and Chapter of Worcester's Estate Act 1816	56 Geo. 3. c. 32 Pr.	20 June 1816
An Act for effecting an Exchange between the Dean and Chapter of the Cathedral Church of Worcester, and John Knight Esquire, of certain Lands in the County of Worcester.
Newcastle-under-Lyme, &c. Inclosure Act 1816	56 Geo. 3. c. 33 Pr.	20 June 1816
An Act for inclosing Lands in the Parishes of Newcastle-under-Lyme, Trentham, Woolstanton, and Stoke-upon-Trent, in the County of Stafford
Dalham Inclosure Act 1816	56 Geo. 3. c. 34 Pr.	20 June 1816
An Act for inclosing and exonerating from Tithes Lands in the Parish of Dalham, in the County of Suffolk.
Strickland, &c. Inclosure Act 1816	56 Geo. 3. c. 35 Pr.	20 June 1816
An Act for inclosing Lands within the Manors, Townships or Divisions of Strickland Kettle and Nether Stavely, in the Parish of Kirkby in Kendal, in the County of Westmorland.
Sonning Inclosure Act 1816	56 Geo. 3. c. 36 Pr.	20 June 1816
An Act for inclosing Lands in the Parish of Sonning, in the Counties of Berks and Oxford.
Arustley Inclosure Act 1816	56 Geo. 3. c. 37 Pr.	20 June 1816
An Act for inclosing Lands in the Manor of Arustley, in the County of Montgomery.
Balcombe Rectory Act 1816	56 Geo. 3. c. 38 Pr.	22 June 1816
An Act for vesting certain Lands belonging to the Reverend Henry Chatfield, in the Rector for the time being of the Parish of Balcombe in the County of Sussex, in Exchange for the Parsonage House of Balcombe, and the Glebe Lands belonging to the said Parish; and for enabling the said Henry Chatfield to build a new Parsonage House upon the first mentioned Lands.
Duke of Bedford's Exchange Act 1816	56 Geo. 3. c. 39 Pr.	22 June 1816
An Act for establishing and effectuating an Exchange made between the Reverend Egerton Robert Neve, Rector of Middleton Stoney, in the County of Oxford, and the Most Noble John Duke of Bedford, and George Bainbridge Esquire, of Glebe and other Lands in Middleton Stoney aforesaid.
Marquis of Tweeddale's Estate Act 1816	56 Geo. 3. c. 40 Pr.	25 June 1816
An Act for rendering valid the Sale of certain Estates in the County of Argyll, and a Salmon Fishing in the County of Inverness, of George Marquis of Tweeddale, made under the Authority of an Act passed in the Forty ninth Year of His present Majesty. (Note: Marquis of Tweeddale's Estate Act 1809 (49 Geo. 3. c. 87 Pr.))
Anderson's Estate Act 1816	56 Geo. 3. c. 41 Pr.	25 June 1816
An Act for vesting Part of the Settled Estates of the Reverend Sir Charles John Anderson Baronet, in the County of York, in Trustees to be sold; and for purchasing other Estates to be settled to the same Uses.
Corsham Inclosure Act 1816	56 Geo. 3. c. 42 Pr.	26 June 1816
An Act for inclosing Lands in the Parish of Corsham, in the County of Wilts.
Boyd's Estate Act 1816	56 Geo. 3. c. 43 Pr.	1 July 1816
An Act for vesting the undivided Parts or Shares of Robert Boyd the Younger, John Boyd and Uriah Boyd, Infants, of and in certain settled Estates in the Parishes of Charlton and Woolwich, in the County of Kent, in Trustees for Sale, and for investing the Monies thence arising in the Purchase of other Estates to be settled to the same Uses.
Boynton's Estate Act 1816	56 Geo. 3. c. 44 Pr.	2 July 1816
An Act for vesting Part of the settled Estates of Sir Francis Boynton Baronet, in Trustees, to be sold, and for applying the Produce in or towards the Discharge of the Incumbrances on the said Estates.
Wharton's Estates Act 1816	56 Geo. 3. c. 45 Pr.	2 July 1816
An Act for effecting an Exchange of certain Settled Estates of John Wharton Esquire, for certain other Estates belonging to him in Fee Simple, situate in the Counties of York, Westmorland and Durham.
Burton's Estate Act 1816	56 Geo. 3. c. 46 Pr.	2 July 1816
An Act for vesting in new Trustees the Trust Estates devised by the Will of Philip Burton Esquire, deceased.
Sylvester's Estate Act 1816	56 Geo. 3. c. 47 Pr.	2 July 1816
An Act for vesting a certain Settled Estate of Ann Sylvester and others, in Westcott, over Westcott and Nether Westcott, in the County of Gloucester, in Trustees, to be sold for paying off Incumbrances thereon, and for purchasing other Estates to be settled to the same Uses.
Earl Gower's Indemnity Act 1816 (Note: This act was not printed by the King's Printer.)	56 Geo. 3. c. 48 Pr.	26 February 1816
An Act to relieve the Right Honourable George Granville Leveson Gower, commonly called Earl Gower, who was elected to serve in this present Parliament for the County of Stafford, from certain Penalties and Disabilities, which he has incurred by sitting and voting in the House of Commons without having taken the Oaths, and in other Respects conformed to the Laws in such case made and provided.
Houghton-with-Castleford Inclosure Act 1816	56 Geo. 3. c. 49 Pr.	22 March 1816
An Act for dividing and inclosing the Open Fields, Ings, Commons and Waste Lands, within the Manor of Houghton with Castleford, in the Parish of Castleford, in the West Riding of the County of York.
Merton Common Inclosure Act 1816	56 Geo. 3. c. 50 Pr.	28 March 1816
An Act for inclosing certain Lands in the Parish of Merton, called Merton Common, in the County of Surrey.
Cheddar, &c. Inclosure Act 1816	56 Geo. 3. c. 51 Pr.	11 April 1816
An Act for amending an Act of His present Majesty (Note: Cheddar, &c. Inclosure Act 1811 (51 Geo. 3. c. 38 Pr.)) for inclosing Lands in the Parishes of Cheddar Priddy and Rodney Stoke in the County of Somerset.
Larling Inclosure Act 1816	56 Geo. 3. c. 52 Pr.	11 April 1816
An Act for inclosing Lands in the Parish of Larling, in the County of Norfolk.
Goddington Tithes Act 1816	56 Geo. 3. c. 53 Pr.	11 April 1816
An Act for making an Allotment or Allotments of Land, in lieu of Tithes and Common Rights, within the Parish of Goddington, in the County of Oxford.
Cleator Inclosure Act 1816	56 Geo. 3. c. 54 Pr.	30 April 1816
An Act for inclosing Lands in the Parish of Cleator, in the County of Cumberland.
Barlow's Divorce Act 1816	56 Geo. 3. c. 55 Pr.	30 April 1816
An Act to dissolve the Marriage of Sir George Hilaro Barlow Baronet, Knight Grand Cross of the Order of Bath, with Dame Eliza, otherwise Elizabeth, his now Wife, and to enable him to marry again, and for other Purposes therein mentioned.
Downton, &c. Inclosure Act 1816	56 Geo. 3. c. 56 Pr.	21 May 1816
An Act for inclosing Lands in the Parishes of Downton and Britford, in the County of Wilts.
Morley Inclosure Act 1816	56 Geo. 3. c. 57 Pr.	21 May 1816
An Act for inclosing Lands in the Township of Morley, in the West Riding of the County of York.
Gilligate Inclosure Act 1816	56 Geo. 3. c. 58 Pr.	21 May 1816
An Act for inclosing Lands in the Manor of Gilligate, in the Parish of Saint Giles, in the County of Durham.
Lindridge Inclosure Act 1816	56 Geo. 3. c. 59 Pr.	21 May 1816
An Act for inclosing a certain Common or Tract of Waste Land, called Minith Wood, in the Parish of Lindridge, in the County of Worcester.
Newton Inclosure Act 1816	56 Geo. 3. c. 60 Pr.	21 May 1816
An Act for inclosing Lands in the Township of Newton, in the Parish of Clodock, in the County of Hertford.
St. Margaret Inclosure Act 1816	56 Geo. 3. c. 61 Pr.	21 May 1816
An Act for inclosing Lands in the Parish of Saint Margaret, in the County of Hereford.
Englehart's Naturalization Act 1816	56 Geo. 3. c. 62 Pr.	21 May 1816
An Act for naturalizing David Engelhart.
Duke of Atholl's Estate Act 1816	56 Geo. 3. c. 63 Pr.	31 May 1816
An Act for settling and securing the Lands and Estates of Wester Kinmaird, Drumnacarff, Craignuisk, Portinsock, Balnaguard, Balnavert and Wester and Easter Logierait and Killiechangie, and other Hereditaments in the County of Perth, to and in favour of John Duke of Atholl, and the Series of Heirs entitled to take by a certain Deed of Entail made by John late Duke of Atholl, under the Conditions and Limitations contained in the said Deed, and in lieu thereof for vesting certain Parts of the Estates entailed by the said John late Duke of Atholl, lying in the said County, in the said John Duke of Atholl, and his Heirs and Assigns, in Fee Simple.
Hawkswick Inclosure Act 1816	56 Geo. 3. c. 64 Pr.	31 May 1816
An Act for inclosing Lands within the Township and Manor of Hawkswick, in the Parish of Arncliff, in the West Riding of the County of York.
Allesley Inclosure Act 1816	56 Geo. 3. c. 65 Pr.	31 May 1816
An Act for inclosing Lands in the Manor and Parish of Allesley, in the County of Warwick.
Buckden and Starbotton Inclosure Act 1816	56 Geo. 3. c. 66 Pr.	31 May 1816
An Act for inclosing Lands within the Townships of Buckden and Starbotton, in the Parishes of Arncliffe and Kettlewell, in the County of York.
Kennedy's Estate Act 1816	56 Geo. 3. c. 67 Pr.	20 June 1816
An Act for settling and securing the Lands of Dunduff and Kirkbride, and other Hereditaments, in the County of Ayr, to and in favour of Thomas Kennedy, of Dunure, in the said County, Esquire, and the Series of Heirs entitled to take by a Deed of Entail and Nomination of Heirs made by Thomas Kennedy, some time of Dunure, Esquire, deceased, under the Conditions and Limitations contained in the said Deed, and in lieu thereof, vesting certain Parts of the entailed Estate of Dunure, in the said County, in the said Thomas Kennedy, now of Dunure, and his Heirs and Assignees, in Fee Simple.
Everley Inclosure Act 1816	56 Geo. 3. c. 68 Pr.	20 June 1816
An Act for dividing and allotting in Severalty, Lands in the Parish of Everley, in the County of Wilts.
Crudwell Inclosure Act 1816	56 Geo. 3. c. 69 Pr.	20 June 1816
An Act for inclosing Lands in the Parish of Crudwell, in the County of Wilts.
Roade and Ashton Inclosure Act 1816	56 Geo. 3. c. 70 Pr.	20 June 1816
An Act for inclosing Lands in the several Parishes, Townships or Liberties of Roade and Ashton, in the County of Northampton, and for extinguishing the Tithes thereof.
Bewcastle Inclosure Act 1816	56 Geo. 3. c. 71 Pr.	20 June 1816
An Act for inclosing Black Lyne Common, in the Parish of Bewcastle, in the County of Cumberland.
Harmondsworth Inclosure Act 1816	56 Geo. 3. c. 72 Pr.	20 June 1816
An Act for amending and rendering effectual an Act of His present Majesty, (Note: Harmondsworth Inclosure Act 1805 (45 Geo. 3. c. 96 Pr.)) for inclosing Lands in the Parish of Harmondsworth in the County of Middlesex.
Klein's Naturalization Act 1816	56 Geo. 3. c. 73 Pr.	20 June 1816
An Act for naturalizing Frederick Klein.
Bagendon Advowson Act 1816	56 Geo. 3. c. 74 Pr.	22 June 1816
An Act for effectuating an Exchange of the Advowson of the Church of the Parish of Bagendon, in the County of Gloucester, belonging to Joseph Pitt Esquire, for a Right which the Principal, Fellows, and Scholars of Jesus College, within the City and University of Oxford, of the Foundation of Queen Elizabeth, have in the Nomination of a Curate to the Curacy of the Impropriate Rectory of Cheltenham, in the said County, also belonging to the said Joseph Pitt.
Abdy's Divorce Act 1816	56 Geo. 3. c. 75 Pr.	25 June 1816
An Act to dissolve the Marriage of Sir William Abdy Baronet, with Dame Anne Abdy his now Wife, and to enable him to marry again, and for other Purposes therein mentioned.
Dyott's Divorce Act 1816	56 Geo. 3. c. 76 Pr.	2 July 1816
An Act to dissolve the Marriage of Lieutenant General William Dyott with Elinor, otherwise Eleanor, his now Wife, and to enable him to marry again, and for other Purposes therein mentioned.

=== Sources ===
- The Statutes of the United Kingdom of Great Britain and Ireland, 56 George III. 1816. London. 1816 – via Internet Archive.
- The Statutes of the United Kingdom of Great Britain and Ireland, 56 George III. 1816. London. 1816 – via Google Books.
- Raithby, John (1816). "56 Georgii° III". The Statutes of the United Kingdom of Great Britain and Ireland. Vol. 6: Containing the Acts 55 George III. (1815.) and 56 George III. (1816.). London: Eyre and Strahan. pp. 697–1146 – via Internet Archive.
- Journals of the House of Commons. Vol. 71. London: His Majesty's Stationery Office. pp. 3–529 – via Google Books.
- Chronological Table of and Index to the Statutes. Vol. 1: To the End of the Session 59 Vict. Sess. 2 (1895) (13th ed.). London: Her Majesty's Stationery Office. 1896. pp. 214–217 – via Google Books.

== See also ==
- List of acts of the Parliament of the United Kingdom
