= List of acts of the Parliament of Great Britain from 1789 =

This is a complete list of acts of the Parliament of Great Britain for the year 1789.

For acts passed until 1707, see the list of acts of the Parliament of England and the list of acts of the Parliament of Scotland. See also the list of acts of the Parliament of Ireland.

For acts passed from 1801 onwards, see the list of acts of the Parliament of the United Kingdom. For acts of the devolved parliaments and assemblies in the United Kingdom, see the list of acts of the Scottish Parliament, the list of acts of the Northern Ireland Assembly, and the list of acts and measures of Senedd Cymru; see also the list of acts of the Parliament of Northern Ireland.

The number shown after each act's title is its chapter number. Acts are cited using this number, preceded by the year(s) of the reign during which the relevant parliamentary session was held; thus the Union with Ireland Act 1800 is cited as "39 & 40 Geo. 3. c. 67", meaning the 67th act passed during the session that started in the 39th year of the reign of George III and which finished in the 40th year of that reign. Note that the modern convention is to use Arabic numerals in citations (thus "41 Geo. 3" rather than "41 Geo. III"). Acts of the last session of the Parliament of Great Britain and the first session of the Parliament of the United Kingdom are both cited as "41 Geo. 3".

Acts passed by the Parliament of Great Britain did not have a short title; however, some of these acts have subsequently been given a short title by acts of the Parliament of the United Kingdom (such as the Short Titles Act 1896).

Before the Acts of Parliament (Commencement) Act 1793 came into force on 8 April 1793, acts passed by the Parliament of Great Britain were deemed to have come into effect on the first day of the session in which they were passed. Because of this, the years given in the list below may in fact be the year before a particular act was passed.

== 29 Geo. 3 ==
The sixth session of the 16th Parliament of Great Britain, which met from 20 November 1788 until 11 August 1789.

This session was also traditionally cited as 29 G. 3.

=== Public acts ===
Short title	Citation	Royal assent
Long title
Trade with America Act 1789 (repealed)	29 Geo. 3. c. 1	24 March 1789
An Act to continue the Laws now in Force for regulating the Trade between the Subjects of His Majesty's Dominions, and the Inhabitants of the Territories belonging to the United States of America, so far as the same relate to the Trade and Commerce carried on between this Kingdom and the Inhabitants of the Countries belonging to the said United States. (Repealed by Statute Law Revision Act 1871 (34 & 35 Vict. c. 116))
Mutiny Act 1789 (repealed)	29 Geo. 3. c. 2	24 March 1789
An Act for punishing Mutiny and Desertion, and for the better Payment of the Army and their Quarters. (Repealed by Statute Law Revision Act 1871 (34 & 35 Vict. c. 116))
Marine Mutiny Act 1789 (repealed)	29 Geo. 3. c. 3	24 March 1789
An Act for the Regulation of His Majesty's Marine Forces while on Shore. (Repealed by Statute Law Revision Act 1871 (34 & 35 Vict. c. 116))
Forehoe, Norfolk (Guardians' Borrowing Powers) Act 1789 (repealed)	29 Geo. 3. c. 4	24 March 1789
An Act for more effectually carrying into Execution the Purposes of certain Acts of the Sixteenth (Note: Forehoe Poor Relief Act 1776 (16 Geo. 3. c. 9)) and Twenty-third (Note: Forehoe, Norfolk (Borrowing Powers of Guardians) Act 1783 (23 Geo. 3. c. 29)) Years of the Reign of His present Majesty, for the better Relief and Employment of the Poor within the Hundred of Forehoe, in the County of Norfolk. (Repealed by Statute Law Revision Act 1948 (11 & 12 Geo. 6. c. 62))
Manchester Square Improvement Act 1789	29 Geo. 3. c. 5	24 March 1789
An Act for the Improvement of Manchester Square, within the Parish of Saint Mary-le-bone, in the County of Middlesex.
Land Tax Act 1789 (repealed)	29 Geo. 3. c. 6	8 April 1789
An Act for granting an Aid to His Majesty by a Land Tax, to be raised in Great Britain, for the Service of the Year One thousand seven hundred and eighty-nine. (Repealed by Statute Law Revision Act 1871 (34 & 35 Vict. c. 116))
Roxburgh Roads Act 1789 (repealed)	29 Geo. 3. c. 7	24 March 1789
An Act for enlarging the Term and Powers of so much of an Act made in the Eighth Year of the Reign of His present Majesty, (Note: Roxburgh Roads Act 1768 (8 Geo. 3. c. 60)) as relates to the repairing and widening several Roads leading through the County of Roxburgh; and for better regulating the Statute Labour within the said County. (Repealed by Roxburgh and Berwick Roads and Bridges Act 1806 (46 Geo. 3. c. xlviii))
Essex Shire House Act 1789	29 Geo. 3. c. 8	8 April 1789
An Act for building a new Shire House, for the County of Essex.
Duties on Shops Act 1789 (repealed)	29 Geo. 3. c. 9	19 May 1789
An Act to repeal Two Acts made in the Twenty-fifth and Twenty-sixth Years of the Reign of His present Majesty, for granting to His Majesty certain Duties on Shops within Great Britain. (Repealed by Statute Law Revision Act 1871 (34 & 35 Vict. c. 116))
Malt Duties Act 1789 (repealed)	29 Geo. 3. c. 10	8 April 1789
An Act for continuing and granting to His Majesty certain Duties upon Malt, Mum, Cyder, and Perry, for the Service of the Year One thousand seven hundred and eighty-nine. (Repealed by Statute Law Revision Act 1871 (34 & 35 Vict. c. 116))
Barthomley Church, Chester Act 1789	29 Geo. 3. c. 11	8 April 1789
An Act to enable Mary Alsager, Margaret Alsager, and Judith Alsager, to finish and complete a new Church or Chapel, in the Parish of Barthomley, in the County of Chester, and to endow the same; and to establish a Charity School within the said Parish, and vesting the Right of Presentation to the said Church or Chapel, in them and the future Lords and Ladies of the Manor of Alsager, within the said County.
Whitby Improvement Act 1789 (repealed)	29 Geo. 3. c. 12	19 May 1789
An Act for paving, repairing, cleansing, lighting, watching, widening, and regulating the Streets, Lanes, Alleys, and Publick Passages within the Town of Whitby in the County of York; for preventing Incroachments, Nuisances, and Annoyances therein; for regulating the Carriages, Cartmen, and Porters there; and for making convenient Approaches to the Bridge over the River Esk within the said Town. (Repealed by Whitby (Yorkshire) Improvement Act 1837 (7 Will. 4 & 1 Vict. c. x))
County Elections Act 1789 (repealed)	29 Geo. 3. c. 13	19 May 1789
An Act to suspend for a limited Time, the Execution of an Act passed in the last Session of Parliament, intituled, "An Act for the better securing the Rights of Persons qualified to vote at County Elections," (Note: County Elections Act 1788 (28 Geo. 3. c. 36)) and for indemnifying the Persons required to carry the said Act into Execution, from the Penalties they may have incurred in not executing all the Provisions of the said Act. (Repealed by Statute Law Revision Act 1871 (34 & 35 Vict. c. 116))
Saint Mary, Wanstead Act 1789	29 Geo. 3. c. 14	19 May 1789
An Act for amending an Act of the Twenty-seventh Year of His present Majesty (Note: Saint Mary Church, Wanstead Act 1787 (27 Geo. 3. c. 63)) for re-building the Church of the Parish of Saint Mary Wanstede alias Wanstead, in the County of Essex.
Militia Pay Act 1789 (repealed)	29 Geo. 3. c. 15	19 May 1789
An Act for defraying the Charge of the Pay and Cloathing of the Militia in that Part of Great Britain called England, for One Year, beginning the Twenty-fifth Day of March One thousand seven hundred and eighty-nine. (Repealed by Statute Law Revision Act 1871 (34 & 35 Vict. c. 116))
Importation Act 1789 (repealed)	29 Geo. 3. c. 16	19 May 1789
An Act to enable His Majesty to authorize, in case of Necessity, the Importation of Bread, Flour, Indian Corn, and Live Stock, from any of the Territories belonging to the United States of America, into the Province of Quebec, and all the Countries bordering on the Gulf of Saint Lawrence, and the Islands within the said Gulf, and to the Coast of Labrador. (Repealed by Trade Act 1822 (3 Geo. 4. c. 44))
Perth Roads Act 1789 (repealed)	29 Geo. 3. c. 17	19 May 1789
An Act for repairing certain Roads in the County of Perth; and for explaining and amending an Act made in the Twenty-fifth Year of the Reign of His present Majesty, (Note: Perth (Highways and Bridge) Act 1785 (25 Geo. 3. c. 13)) for repairing the Highways, Bridges, and Ferries in the County of Perth. (Repealed by Statute Labour, Roads, Bridges and Ferries in Perthshire Act 1811 (51 Geo. 3. c. cxcvii) and Roads and Bridges in Perthshire Act 1811 (51 Geo. 3. c. cxcviii))
County Elections (No. 2) Act 1789 (repealed)	29 Geo. 3. c. 18	19 May 1789
An Act for repealing an Act made in the last Session of Parliament, intituled, "An Act for the better securing the Rights of Persons qualified to vote at County Elections." (Repealed by Statute Law Revision Act 1871 (34 & 35 Vict. c. 116))
Designing and Printing of Linens, etc. Act 1789 (repealed)	29 Geo. 3. c. 19	19 May 1789
An Act for continuing an Act made in the Twenty-seventh Year of the Reign of His present Majesty, intituled, "An Act for the Encouragement of the Arts of designing and printing Linens, Cottons, Callicoes, and Muslins, by vesting the Properties thereof in the Designers, Printers, and Proprietors, for a limited Time." (Note: Designing and Printing of Linens, etc. Act 1787 (27 Geo. 3. c. 38)) (Repealed by Copyright of Designs Act 1842 (5 & 6 Vict. c. 100))
Forfar Roads Act 1789 (repealed)	29 Geo. 3. c. 20	19 May 1789
An Act for repairing the Roads in the County of Forfar, and for regulating the Statute Labour within the same. (Repealed by Statute Labour in Forfar (County) Act 1810 (50 Geo. 3. c. cxx) (Note: Incorrectly cited as "40 Geo. 3. c. cxx" in the Chronological Table of the Statutes.), Roads in Forfar (County) Act 1810 (50 Geo. 3. c. cxxi) and Forfar Roads Act 1826 (7 Geo. 4. c. cxxviii))
New Shoreham Harbour Act 1789 (repealed)	29 Geo. 3. c. 21	19 May 1789
An Act for altering the Powers of an Act made in the Thirty-third Year of the Reign of His late Majesty King George the Second, (Note: New Shoreham Harbour Act 1759 (33 Geo. 2. c. 35)) for erecting Piers and other Works for the Security and Improvement of the Harbour of New Shoreham in the County of Sussex; and for keeping the same in Repair. (Repealed by Shoreham Harbour Act 1816 (56 Geo. 3. c. lxxxi))
Bedford Level Act 1789	29 Geo. 3. c. 22	19 May 1789
An Act to amend and render effectual an Act of the Thirty-first Year of King George the Second, (Note: Bedford Level Drainage Act 1757 (31 Geo. 2. c. 18)) for draining and preserving certain Fen Lands and Low Grounds in the Isle of Ely and County of Cambridge, between the Cam otherwise Grant, Ouse, and Mildenhall Rivers, and bounded on the South-East by the Hard Lands of Islesham, Fordham, Soham, and Wicken; and for empowering the Governor, Bailiffs, and Commonalty of the Company of Conservators of the Great Level of the Fens, called Bedford Level, to sell certain Lands within the said Limits, commonly called Invested Lands; and for laying certain Rates on Vessels navigated upon the said Rivers, towards supporting the Banks thereof.
Bridlington Pier Act 1789 (repealed)	29 Geo. 3. c. 23	24 June 1789
An Act for enlarging the Term and Powers of several Acts passed in the Eighth and Ninth Years of the Reign of King William the Third, (Note: Bridlington Piers Act 1696 (8 & 9 Will. 3. c. 29)) and in the First, (Note: Bridlington Pier Act 1715 (1 Geo. 1. St. 2. c. 49)) Fifth, (Note: Bridlington Piers Act 1718 (5 Geo. 1. c. 10)) and Seventh (Note: Bridlington Piers Act 1720 (7 Geo. 1. St. 1. c. 16)) Years of the Reign of King George the First, and in the Twenty-sixth Year of the Reign of His late Majesty King George the Second, (Note: Bridlington Piers Act 1753 (26 Geo. 2. c. 10)) for rebuilding, repairing, and amending the Piers of Bridlington, alias Burlington, in the County of York. (Repealed by Bridlington Piers and Harbour Act 1837 (7 Will. 4 & 1 Vict. c. cx))
Llanfyllin Market House Act 1789 (repealed)	29 Geo. 3. c. 24	24 June 1789
An Act for re-building the Market House of the Town of Llanfyllin, in the County of Montgomery, and for other Purposes therein mentioned, and defraying the Expence thereof by Sale of certain Waste Lands in the Townships of Globwlch and Bachau, in the said County. (Repealed by Statute Law (Repeals) Act 1981 (c. 19))
Northumberland Fishery Act 1789 (repealed)	29 Geo. 3. c. 25	24 June 1789
An Act to incorporate certain Persons therein named, and their Successors, by the Name and Style of the Northumberland Fishery Society, and to enable them, when incorporated, to subscribe a Capital Joint Stock for more effectually supporting, conducting, and encreasing such Fishery. (Repealed by Statute Law (Repeals) Act 1981 (c. 19))
Duty on Hawkers, etc. Act 1789 (repealed)	29 Geo. 3. c. 26	24 June 1789
An Act to explain and amend an Act made in the Twenty-fifth Year of the Reign of His present Majesty, intituled, "An Act for granting to His Majesty additional Duties on Hawkers, Pedlars, and Petty Chapmen, and for regulating their Trade." (Note: Hawkers Act 1785 (25 Geo. 3. c. 78)) (Repealed by Statute Law Revision Act 1861 (24 & 25 Vict. c. 101))
Hastings Improvement Act 1789 (repealed)	29 Geo. 3. c. 27	24 June 1789
An Act for paving, cleansing, lighting, improving, and regulating the Streets, Lanes, and other Public Passages and Places, and for repairing the Highways within the Parish of Saint Clement, in the Town and Port of Hasting, in the County of Sussex; and for removing and preventing Nuisances, Annoyances, Obstructions, and Encroachments within the said Town and Port. (Repealed by Hastings Improvement Act 1820 (1 Geo. 4. c. xii))
Forfeited Estates (Scotland) Act 1789 (repealed)	29 Geo. 3. c. 28	24 June 1789
An Act for appropriating the Sum of Three thousand Pounds out of the unexhausted Balance or Surplus arising from the forfeited Estates in North Britain, to be applied by the Highland Society of Scotland at Edinburgh, to Public Uses in that Part of the Kingdom. (Repealed by Statute Law (Repeals) Act 1993 (c. 50))
Highworth, Wiltshire (Workhouse and Additional Overseer) Act 1789 (repealed)	29 Geo. 3. c. 29	24 June 1789
An Act for providing a Workhouse for the Use of the Parish of Highworth, in the County of Wilts; and for appointing an additional Overseer for the better Government of the Poor of the said Parish. (Repealed by Statute Law Revision Act 1948 (11 & 12 Geo. 6. c. 62))
Saint Paul, Covent Garden: Church Repair, etc. Act 1789 (repealed)	29 Geo. 3. c. 30	24 June 1789
An Act to amend and enlarge the Powers of an Act passed in the last Session of Parliament, intituled, "An Act for repairing the Church of the Parish of Saint Paul, Covent Garden, in the County of Middlesex; for repairing and improving the Gates and Avenues leading to the said Church; and for removing the present Watch House and providing another for the Use of the said Parish." (Note: Saint Paul Covent Garden Church Rebuilding Act 1788 (28 Geo. 3. c. 83)) (Repealed by Parish of St. Paul Covent Garden Act 1829 (10 Geo. 4. c. lxviii))
Saint Chad, Shrewsbury Parish Church Act 1789	29 Geo. 3. c. 31	24 June 1789
An Act for re-building the Parish Church of Saint Chad, in the Town of Shrewsbury and County of Salop; and for providing a new Cemetery or Burial Ground, and making convenient Avenues and Passages to the said Church and Cemetery.
Lincoln (Drainage) Act 1789	29 Geo. 3. c. 32	24 June 1789
An Act for embanking and draining certain Fens and Low Lands in the Parishes of Nocton and Potterhanworth, in the County of Lincoln; and in the Parish of Branston, in the County of the City of Lincoln.
Lottery Act 1789 (repealed)	29 Geo. 3. c. 33	13 July 1789
An Act for granting to His Majesty a certain Sum of Money to be raised by a Lottery. (Repealed by Statute Law Revision Act 1871 (34 & 35 Vict. c. 116))
Loans or Exchequer Bills Act 1789 (repealed)	29 Geo. 3. c. 34	13 July 1789
An Act for raising a certain Sum of Money by Loans or Exchequer Bills, for the Service of the Year One thousand seven hundred and eighty-nine. (Repealed by Statute Law Revision Act 1871 (34 & 35 Vict. c. 116))
Loans or Exchequer Bills Act 1789 (repealed)	29 Geo. 3. c. 35	13 July 1789
An Act for raising a further Sum of Money by Loans or Exchequer Bills, for the Service of the Year One thousand seven hundred and eighty-nine. (Repealed by Statute Law Revision Act 1871 (34 & 35 Vict. c. 116))
Papists Act 1789 (repealed)	29 Geo. 3. c. 36	13 July 1789
An Act for allowing further Time for Enrolment of Deeds and Wills made by Papists; and for Relief of Protestant Purchasers. (Repealed by Statute Law Revision Act 1871 (34 & 35 Vict. c. 116))
National Debt Act 1789 (repealed)	29 Geo. 3. c. 37	13 July 1789
An Act for raising a certain Sum of Money by Way of Annuities. (Repealed by Statute Law Revision Act 1870 (33 & 34 Vict. c. 69))
City of London Improvement Act 1789	29 Geo. 3. c. 38	24 June 1789
An Act for opening a new Street from Fleet Street to Temple Street in the City of London; and also a Public Passage from such new Street towards Water Lane; and for stopping up or altering certain Courts, Alleys, or Passages, and setting out others near to or communicating with such new Street and Passage.
River Lune Navigation Act 1789 (repealed)	29 Geo. 3. c. 39	24 June 1789
An Act to explain, amend, and render more effectual several Acts made in the Twenty-third Year of the Reign of His late Majesty King George the Second, (Note: River Lune Navigation Act 1749 (23 Geo. 2. c. 12)) and the Twelfth Year of the Reign of His present Majesty, (Note: River Lune Navigation Act 1772 (12 Geo. 3. c. 81)) for improving the Navigation of the River Loyne, otherwise called Lune; and for building a Quay or Wharf near the Town of Lancaster, in the County Palatine of Lancaster; and for other Purposes therein mentioned. (Repealed by Lancaster Port Commission Revision Order 1967 (SI 1968/532))
Indemnity Act 1789 (repealed)	29 Geo. 3. c. 40	13 July 1789
An Act to indemnify such Persons as have omitted to qualify themselves for Offices and Employments, and to indemnify Justices of the Peace or others who have omitted to register or deliver in their Qualifications within the Time limited by Law, and for giving further Time for those Purposes; and to indemnify Members and Officers in Cities, Corporations, and Borough Towns, whose Admissions have been omitted to be stamped according to Law, or having been stamped have been lost or mislaid, and for allowing them Time to provide Admissions duly stamped; to give further Time to such Persons as have omitted to make and file Affidavits of the Execution of Indentures of Clerks to Attornies and Solicitors, or to pay the Duties on the Indentures and Contracts of Clerks, Apprentices, or Servants; and for indemnifying Deputy Lieutenants and Officers of the Militia who have neglected to transmit Descriptions of their Qualifications to the Clerks of the Peace within the Time limited by Law, and for giving further Time for that Purpose. (Repealed by Promissory Oaths Act 1871 (34 & 35 Vict. c. 48))
Tontine Annuities Act 1789 (repealed)	29 Geo. 3. c. 41	13 July 1789
An Act for raising a certain Sum of Money by Way of Annuities, to be attended with the Benefit of Survivorship, in Classes. (Repealed by Statute Law Revision Act 1887 (50 & 51 Vict. c. 59))
Cockburnspath Bridge, Berwick Act 1789 (repealed)	29 Geo. 3. c. 42	13 July 1789
An Act for applying the Sum of One thousand Pounds out of the unexhausted Balance or Surplus, arising from the forfeited Estates in North Britain, towards compleating and finishing the Bridge over the Pees or Pass of Cockburnspath, in the County of Berwick. (Repealed by Statute Law (Repeals) Act 1998 (c. 43))
Greenock Improvement Act 1789 (repealed)	29 Geo. 3. c. 43	13 July 1789
An Act for altering and enlarging the Powers of an Act made in the Thirteenth Year of the Reign of His present Majesty, intituled, "An Act for deepening, cleansing, and making more commodious the Harbours of the Town of Greenock; for supplying the Inhabitants with fresh and wholesome Water; and for paving, cleansing, lighting, and watching the Streets and other Public Places within the said Town." (Note: Greenock Water Supply, etc. Act 1772 (13 Geo. 3. c. 28)) (Repealed by Greenock Improvement Act 1840 (3 & 4 Vict. c. xxvii) (Note: Incorrectly cited as "3 & 4 Vict. c. xxviii" in the Chronological Table of the Statutes.) and Greenock Port and Harbour Act 1866 (29 & 30 Vict. c. clvi))
Chelmsford Improvement Act 1789 (repealed)	29 Geo. 3. c. 44	13 July 1789
An Act for paving the Footways of the several Streets, Public Passages, and Places within the Town of Chelmsford and Hamlet of Moulsham, in the Parish of Chelmsford in the County of Essex; and for cleansing, lighting, and watching the said Town and Hamlet; and for removing and preventing Nuisances, Annoyances, and Encroachments therein. (Repealed by Essex Act 1987 (c. xx))
Excise Duties Act 1789 (repealed)	29 Geo. 3. c. 45	13 July 1789
An Act for amending and continuing for a limited Time an Act made in the last Session of Parliament, (Note: Excise (No. 2) Act 1788 (28 Geo. 3. c. 46)) intituled, "An Act for discontinuing for a limited Time the several Duties payable in Scotland upon Low Wines and Spirits, and upon Worts, Wash, and other Liquors there used in the Distillation of Spirits, and for granting to His Majesty other Duties in lieu thereof; and for better regulating the Exportation of British made Spirits from England to Scotland, and from Scotland to England; and to continue for a limited Time an Act made in the Twenty-sixth Year of the Reign of His present Majesty, (Note: Excise (No. 3) Act 1786 (26 Geo. 3. c. 73)) To discontinue for a limited Time the Payment of the Duties upon Low Wines and Spirits for Home Consumption, and for granting and securing the due Payment of other Duties in lieu thereof; and for the better Regulation of the making and vending British Spirits; and for discontinuing for a limited Time certain Imposts and Duties upon Rum and Spirits imported from the West Indies;" and to revive and continue the said last-mentioned Act. (Repealed by Statute Law Revision Act 1871 (34 & 35 Vict. c. 116))
Destruction of Property (Scotland) Act 1789 (repealed)	29 Geo. 3. c. 46	13 July 1789
An Act for preventing the wilfully burning or destroying Ships; and the wilfully and maliciously destroying any Woollen, Silk, Linen, or Cotton Goods, or any Implements prepared for or used in the Manufacture thereof, in that Part of Great Britain called Scotland. (Repealed by Statute Law Revision Act 1948 (11 & 12 Geo. 6. c. 62))
Saint James, Westminster Improvement Act 1789 (repealed)	29 Geo. 3. c. 47	31 July 1789
An Act for providing an additional Burying Ground for the Parish of Saint James, Westminster, and erecting a Chapel adjoining thereto, and also a House for the Residence of a Clergyman to officiate in burying the Dead. (Repealed by London Government (City of Westminster) Order in Council 1901 (SR&O 1901/278))
Saint Giles, Pontefract Act 1789	29 Geo. 3. c. 48	31 July 1789
An Act for constituting the Church of Saint Giles, in the Parish of Pontefract, in the County of York, the Parish Church, and for other Purposes.
Duties on Horses and Carriage Act 1789 (repealed)	29 Geo. 3. c. 49	31 July 1789
An Act for granting to His Majesty several additional Rates and Duties upon Horses, and Carriages with Four Wheels; and for explaining and amending an Act passed in the Twenty-fifth Year of His present Majesty, (Note: Excise (No. 2) Act 1785 (25 Geo. 3. c. 47)) as far as relates to certain Carriages with Two or Three Wheels therein mentioned. (Repealed by Statute Law Revision Act 1861 (24 & 25 Vict. c. 101))
Stamps Act 1789 (repealed)	29 Geo. 3. c. 50	31 July 1789
An Act for granting to His Majesty several additional Stamp Duties on Newspapers, Advertisements, and on Cards and Dice. (Repealed by Statute Law Revision Act 1861 (24 & 25 Vict. c. 101))
Stamps (No. 2) Act 1789 (repealed)	29 Geo. 3. c. 51	31 July 1789
An Act for granting to His Majesty several additional Stamp Duties on Probates of Wills, Letters of Administration, and on Receipts for Legacies, or for any Share of a Personal Estate, divided by Force of the Statute of Distributions. (Repealed by Statute Law Revision Act 1871 (34 & 35 Vict. c. 116))
Erection of Lighthouses Act 1789 (repealed)	29 Geo. 3. c. 52	13 July 1789
An Act to give further Powers to the Commissioners for erecting certain Lighthouses in the Northern Parts of Great Britain. (Repealed by Merchant Shipping Repeal Act 1854 (17 & 18 Vict. c. 120))
Whale Fisheries Act 1789 (repealed)	29 Geo. 3. c. 53	31 July 1789
An Act for further encouraging and regulating the Newfoundland, Greenland, and Southern Whale Fisheries. (Repealed by Statute Law Revision Act 1861 (24 & 25 Vict. c. 101))
Flax and Cotton Manufactures Act 1789 (repealed)	29 Geo. 3. c. 54	31 July 1789
An Act for further continuing an Act made in the Twenty-third Year of the Reign of His present Majesty, intituled, "An Act for the more effectual Encouragement of the Manufactures of Flax and Cotton in Great Britain." (Note: Flax, etc., Manufacture Act 1783 (23 Geo. 3. c. 77)) (Repealed by Statute Law Revision Act 1871 (34 & 35 Vict. c. 116))
Continuance of Laws Act 1789 (repealed)	29 Geo. 3. c. 55	31 July 1789
An Act to continue several Laws therein mentioned, relative to the better Encouragement of the making of Sail Cloth in Great Britain; to the Encouragement of the Silk Manufactures, and for taking off several Duties on Merchandize exported, and reducing other Duties; to the free Importation of Cochineal and Indigo; to the prohibiting the Importation of Books reprinted abroad, and first composed, written, and printed in Great Britain; to securing the Duties upon Foreign made Sail Cloth, and charging Foreign made Sails with a Duty; to the prohibiting the Importation of Foreign Wrought Silks and Velvets; to the discontinuing the Duties payable upon the Importation of Tallow, Hogs Lard, and Grease; to the prohibiting the Exportation of Tools and Utensils made use of in the Iron and Steel Manufactures of this Kingdom, and to prevent the seducing of Artificers and Workmen employed in those Manufactures to go into Parts beyond the Seas; and to the ascertaining the Strength of Spirits by Clarke's Hydrometer. (Repealed by Statute Law Revision Act 1871 (34 & 35 Vict. c. 116))
Trade Act 1789 (repealed)	29 Geo. 3. c. 56	31 July 1789
An Act for explaining and amending an Act passed in the last Session of Parliament, intituled, "An Act for regulating the Trade between the Subjects of His Majesty's Colonies and Plantations in North America and in the West India Islands, and the Countries belonging to the United States of America; and between His Majesty's said Subjects, and the Foreign Islands in the West Indies." (Note: Trade Act 1788 (28 Geo. 3. c. 6)) (Repealed by Trade Act 1822 (3 Geo. 4. c. 44))
Pawnbrokers Act 1789	29 Geo. 3. c. 57	31 July 1789
An Act for further regulating the Trade or Business of Pawnbrokers.
Importation and Exportation Act 1789 (repealed)	29 Geo. 3. c. 58	31 July 1789
An Act for better regulating and ascertaining the Importation and Exportation of Corn and Grain; and also for better regulating the Exportation of Starch, and the Importation of Rape Seed. (Repealed by Importation and Exportation (No. 2) Act 1791 (31 Geo. 3. c. 30))
Customs Act 1789 (repealed)	29 Geo. 3. c. 59	11 August 1789
An Act for allowing the like Drawback on Teas exported to the Islands of Guernsey and Jersey, and to Gibraltar, and other Places on the Continent of Europe, and to Africa, as is now allowed on Teas exported to Ireland or America. (Repealed by Statute Law Revision Act 1861 (24 & 25 Vict. c. 101))
Customs (No. 2) Act 1789 (repealed)	29 Geo. 3. c. 60	11 August 1789
An Act for granting further Time for allowing the Drawback upon the Exportation of Coffee, imported by the East India Company in the Ship Lord Camden, (Note: Lord Camden (1783 EIC ship).) in the Year One thousand seven hundred and eighty-six. (Repealed by Statute Law Revision Act 1871 (34 & 35 Vict. c. 116))
Appropriation Act 1789 (repealed)	29 Geo. 3. c. 61	11 August 1789
An Act for granting to His Majesty a certain Sum of Money out of the Consolidated Fund, and for applying a certain Sum of Money therein mentioned, for the Service of the Year One thousand seven hundred and eighty-nine; for further appropriating the Supplies granted in this Session of Parliament; and for making forth Duplicates of Exchequer Bills, Lottery Tickets, Certificates, Receipts, Annuity Orders, or other Orders, lost, burnt, or otherwise destroyed. (Repealed by Statute Law Revision Act 1871 (34 & 35 Vict. c. 116))
American Loyalists Act 1789 (repealed)	29 Geo. 3. c. 62	11 August 1789
An Act for appointing Commissioners further to enquire into the Losses and Services of all such Persons who have suffered in their Rights, Properties, and Professions, during the late unhappy Dissentions in America, in consequence of their Loyalty to His Majesty, and Attachment to the British Government. (Repealed by Statute Law Revision Act 1871 (34 & 35 Vict. c. 116))
Excise Act 1789 (repealed)	29 Geo. 3. c. 63	11 August 1789
An Act to exempt all Piece Goods wove in this Kingdom, and which shall be sold by Auction, from the Duty imposed on such Sales; for exempting Persons licensed to retail Spirituous Liquors from the Payment of the Duties imposed on such Licences, who shall leave off retailing such Liquors before the Expiration of the Time for which such Licences shall be granted; and for obliging Persons who shall deal in Brandy, not being Retailers, Rectifiers, or Distillers, to take out Licences for that Purpose. (Repealed by Statute Law Revision Act 1871 (34 & 35 Vict. c. 116))
Customs (No. 3) Act 1789 (repealed)	29 Geo. 3. c. 64	11 August 1789
An Act to authorize the Lord High Treasurer, or the Commissioners of the Treasury, to appoint Two of the Commissioners of the Customs in England, and One of the Commissioners of the Customs in Scotland, to enquire into the Annual Amount of the Emoluments of Officers of the Customs, and other Persons employed in that Revenue. (Repealed by Statute Law Revision Act 1871 (34 & 35 Vict. c. 116))
East India Company (Money) Act 1789 or the East India Company Stock Act 1789 (repealed)	29 Geo. 3. c. 65	11 August 1789
An Act to enable the East India Company to raise Money by further increasing their Capital Stock. (Repealed by East India Loans Act 1937 (1 Edw. 8 & 1 Geo. 6. c. 14))
Slave Trade Act 1789 (repealed)	29 Geo. 3. c. 66	11 August 1789
An Act to continue for a limited Time, and amend an Act made in the last Session of Parliament, intituled, "An Act to regulate for a limited Time, the shipping and carrying Slaves in British Vessels from the Coast of Africa." (Note: Slave Trade Act 1788 (28 Geo. 3. c. 54)) (Repealed by Statute Law Revision Act 1871 (34 & 35 Vict. c. 116))
Gaols Act 1789 (repealed)	29 Geo. 3. c. 67	11 August 1789
An Act for the more effectual Execution of the Laws respecting Gaols. (Repealed by Statute Law Revision Act 1861 (24 & 25 Vict. c. 101))
Duties on Tobacco and Snuff Act 1789 (repealed)	29 Geo. 3. c. 68	11 August 1789
An Act for repealing the Duties on Tobacco and Snuff, and for granting new Duties in lieu thereof. (Repealed by Tobacco Act 1840 (3 & 4 Vict. c. 18))
Faversham (Improvement) Act 1789 (repealed)	29 Geo. 3. c. 69	24 June 1789
An Act for the better paving, repairing, cleansing, lighting and watching the Highways, Streets, Lanes, and other Public Passages and Places within the Town and Liberty of Faversham in the County of Kent; and also certain Places near or adjoining thereto; and for removing and preventing Encroachments, Obstructions, Nuisances, and Annoyances therein. (Repealed by Local Government Board's Provisional Orders Confirmation (No. 14) Act 1889 (52 & 53 Vict. c. clxxii))
Lincoln (Drainage) (No. 2) Act 1789	29 Geo. 3. c. 70	24 June 1789
An Act for dividing and enclosing the Open Common Fen and Ings, in the Parish of Dunston, in the County of Lincoln, and for draining and improving certain Parts thereof, and also certain enclosed Low Lands in the said Parish, and in the Parish of Metheringham, in the said County.
Saint Pancras Improvement Act 1789 (repealed)	29 Geo. 3. c. 71	13 July 1789
An Act for paving, lighting, cleansing, watering and watching such Streets and other Public Places within that Part of the Parish of Saint Pancras in the County of Middlesex, which lies on the North and South Sides of the New Road leading from Paddington to Islington, called Sommers Town, and is now actually leased to Jacob Leroux Esquire, for building upon, or that may be hereafter leased for the like Purpose; and for preventing Nuisances and Obstructions therein. (Repealed by London Government (Borough of St. Pancras) Order in Council 1901 (SR&O 1901/274))
Andover Canal Act 1789 or the Andevor Canal Act 1789 (repealed)	29 Geo. 3. c. 72	13 July 1789
An Act for making and maintaining a Navigable Canal from or near the Borough of Andevor, in the County of Southampton, to or near Redbridge, in the Parish of Millbrook, in the said County. (Repealed by Andover and Redbridge Railway Act 1858 (21 & 22 Vict. c. lxxxii) (Note: Incorrectly cited as "22 & 23 Vict. c. lxxxii" in the Chronological Table of the Statutes.))
Bath Improvement Act 1789	29 Geo. 3. c. 73	13 July 1789
An Act for protecting and securing the Hot Baths and Springs within the City of Bath from Injury by Encroachments and Annoyances; for enlarging or re-building the present Pump Rooms there; for widening certain Streets, Lanes, and Public Passages; and for making certain new Streets and Passages to render the Approaches to the said Hot Baths, Springs, and Pump Rooms more safe and commodious.
Cromford Canal Act 1789	29 Geo. 3. c. 74	31 July 1789
An Act for making and maintaining a Navigable Canal from, or from near to Cromford Bridge, in the County of Derby, to join and communicate with Erewash Canal, at or near Langley Bridge, and also a Collateral Cut from the said intended Canal at or near Codnor Park Mill to or near Pinxton Mill, in the said County.
St. George Hanover Square Improvement Act 1789 (repealed)	29 Geo. 3. c. 75	13 July 1789
An Act for the better Relief and Employment of the Poor of the Parish of Saint George, Hanover Square, within the Liberty of the City of Westminster; for repairing the Highways, regulating the Beadles, Watch, and Patrol; for paving, repairing, cleansing, lighting, and removing and preventing Nuisances and Annoyances within several of the Streets and other Public Passages and Places within the said Parish; and for other Purposes relating to the said Parish. (Repealed by St. George Hanover Square Improvement Act 1813 (53 Geo. 3. c. xxxviii) and St. George Hanover Square Improvement Act 1826 (7 Geo. 4. c. cxxi))
Forest of Knaresborough Inclosure Act 1789 (repealed)	29 Geo. 3. c. 76 (Note: This act was given royal assent as a private act.)	31 July 1789
An Act for reviving certain Powers granted by an Act made in the Tenth Year of the Reign of His present Majesty, intituled, "An Act for dividing and enclosing such of the Open Parts of the District called The Forest of Knaresborough, in the County of York, as lie within the Eleven Constableries thereof; and for other Purposes therein mentioned;" (Note: Forest of Knaresborough Inclosure Act 1770 (10 Geo. 3. c. 94 Pr.)) and by an Act of the Fourteenth Year of His Majesty's Reign, (Note: Forest of Knaresborough Inclosure (Amendment) Act 1774 (14 Geo. 3. c. 54 Pr.)) for amending the said former Act; and for making the said Two Acts more effectual. (Repealed by Harrogate Borough Council Act 1986 (c. xii))
Southwold Harbour Act 1789 (repealed)	29 Geo. 3. c. 77	13 July 1789
An Act for continuing and making more effectual the Acts of Parliament (Note: Southwold Harbour Act 1746 (20 Geo. 2. c. 14)) (Note: Southwold Harbour Act 1757 (30 Geo. 2. c. 58)) for opening, cleansing, repairing, and improving the Harbour of Southwold in the County of Suffolk. (Repealed by Southwold Harbour Act 1830 (11 Geo. 4 & 1 Will. 4. c. xlviii))
Yorkshire Drainage Act 1789	29 Geo. 3. c. 78	13 July 1789
An Act for dividing, enclosing, and draining the Open Fields, Ings, Pastures, Commons, and Waste Grounds, within the Townships of West Haddlesey, Chapel Haddlesey, and East Haddlesey, and Temple Hirst, in the Parish of Birkin, in the West Riding of the County of York.
Ayr Roads Act 1789 (repealed)	29 Geo. 3. c. 79	19 May 1789
An Act for making and repairing the Road from the City of Glasgow in the County of Lanark, to Muirkirk, in the County of Ayr; and from thence to the Confines of the said County of Ayr towards Sanquhar, in the County of Dumfries, and other Roads communicating therewith. (Repealed by Roads in Lanark, Ayr and Renfrew and Dalmarnock Bridge Act 1842 (5 & 6 Vict. c. cxii))
Sunderland to Durham Roads Act 1789 (repealed)	29 Geo. 3. c. 80	8 April 1789
An Act to enlarge the Term and Powers of Two Acts made in the Twentieth Year of the Reign of His late Majesty King George the Second, (Note: Sunderland to Durham Road Act 1746 (20 Geo. 2. c. 13)) and the Eighth Year of the Reign of His present Majesty, (Note: Sunderland to Durham Road Act 1768 (8 Geo. 3. c. 42)) for repairing the Road from Sunderland, near the Sea, to the City of Durham, in the County of Durham. (Repealed by Sunderland and Durham Road Act 1831 (1 & 2 Will. 4. c. lxiv))
Bishop Wearmouth and Norton Road Act 1789 (repealed)	29 Geo. 3. c. 81	8 April 1789
An Act for altering, raising, widening, repairing, and preserving the Road leading from the Town of Bishop Wearmouth, near Sunderland, in the County of Durham, to the Town of Norton, near Stockton, in the said County. (Repealed by Bishop Wearmouth and Norton (Durham) Road Act 1832 (2 & 3 Will. 4. c. lxi))
Old Street Road Act 1789 (repealed)	29 Geo. 3. c. 82	19 May 1789
An Act to enlarge the Term and Powers of Three Acts made in the Twenty-sixth (Note: Old Street Road Act 1753 (26 Geo. 2. c. 87)) and Twenty-ninth (Note: Old Street Road Act 1756 (29 Geo. 2. c. 44)) Years of the Reign of His late Majesty King George the Second, and the Twelfth Year of the Reign of His present Majesty, (Note: Old Street Road Act 1772 (12 Geo. 3. c. 99)) for repairing and widening Old Street Road, in the Parishes of Saint Luke, and Saint Leonard, Shoreditch, in the County of Middlesex; and also for repairing and keeping in Repair the Road leading from Worship Street to Crown Street, along the East Side of Moorfields. (Repealed by Metropolis Roads Act 1826 (7 Geo. 4. c. cxlii))
Stafford and Warwick Roads Act 1789 (repealed)	29 Geo. 3. c. 83	13 July 1789
An Act for enlarging the Terms of Three Acts made in the Second, (Note: Lichfield Roads Act 1728 (2 Geo. 2. c. 5)) Seventeenth, (Note: Litchfield Roads Act 1743 (17 Geo. 2. c. 24)) and Twenty-eighth (Note: Litchfield and Chester Roads Act 1755 (28 Geo. 2. c. 52)) Years of His late Majesty, for repairing the Roads from Coleshill, (Note: Coleshill, Warwickshire.) through the City of Lichfield (Note: Lichfield, Staffordshire.) and the Town of Stone (Note: Stone, Staffordshire.) to the End of the County of Stafford, (Note: Where the A51 crosses the Staffordshire/Cheshire border. 52°57′38″N 2°23′02″W) in the Road leading towards Chester, and several other Roads in the said Acts mentioned, in the Counties of Warwick and Stafford, and City and County of the City of Lichfield, and for making more effectual Provision for repairing and widening the said Roads, and other Roads therein mentioned, in the said County of Stafford. (Repealed by Roads through Lichfield Act 1814 (54 Geo. 3. c. liii), Lichfield Turnpike Roads (Warwickshire, Staffordshire) Act 1832 (2 & 3 Will. 4. c. lxxi) and Road from Coleshill through Lichfield, and Rugeley and Alrewas Road Act 1834 (4 & 5 Will. 4. c. xxviii))
Kent Roads Act 1789 (repealed)	29 Geo. 3. c. 84	8 April 1789
An Act for enlarging the Term and Powers of an Act of the Ninth Year of His present Majesty, (Note: Kent Roads Act 1769 (9 Geo. 3. c. 43)) for repairing and widening the Roads from the Turnpike Road at Golford Green, in the Parish of Cranbrooke, to the Turnpike Road in the Parish of Sandhurst; and from the Green near Benenden Church, to the Bull Inn, at Rolvenden Cross, in the County of Kent. (Repealed by Cranbrook and Sandhurst, and Benenden and Rolvenden Cross Roads Act 1833 (3 & 4 Will. 4. c. xxviii))
Kent and Sussex Roads Act 1789 (repealed)	29 Geo. 3. c. 85	8 April 1789
An Act for enlarging the Term and Powers of an Act of the Seventh Year of His present Majesty, (Note: Kent and Sussex Roads (No. 2) Act 1766 (7 Geo. 3. c. 86)) for repairing, widening, and keeping in Repair, the Road leading from the High Road between Bromley and Farnborough, in the County of Kent, to Beggar's Bush, in the Turnpike Road leading from Tunbridge Wells, to Maresfield, in the County of Sussex. (Repealed by Junction Road between Bromley and Farnborough Road and Tunbridge Wells and Maresfield Road Act 1831 (1 Will. 4. c. xlv))
Wakefield to Abberford Road Act 1789 (repealed)	29 Geo. 3. c. 86	8 April 1789
An Act for repairing and widening the Road from the Town of Wakefield, to the Town of Abberford, in the West Riding of the County of York. (Repealed by Wakefield and Aberford Road Act 1831 (1 Will. 4. c. xxxv))
Dumfries Roads Act 1789 (repealed)	29 Geo. 3. c. 87	19 May 1789
An Act for repairing and widening the Road from Grateney, by Annan, Dumfries, and Sanquhar, in the County of Dumfries, to the Confines of the County of Ayr, and the Road from Corsenarget to Wanlockhead, in the said County of Dumfries. (Repealed by %[%[Roads in Dumfries and Kirkcudbright Act 1801]] ([[41 Geo. 3 (U.K.)41 Geo. 3%]%]. c. xlix))
Southampton Roads Act 1789 (repealed)	29 Geo. 3. c. 88	19 May 1789
An Act for continuing and rendering more effectual several Acts for repairing the Road from Hertford-bridge Hill to the Town of Basingstoke; and also the Road from Hertford-bridge Hill aforesaid, to the Town of Odiham in the County of Southampton; and for extending the Limits of the said last-mentioned Road, from the present Termination thereof in the said Town of Odiham, to the Road leading from thence through the said Town to the great Western Road at Bartley Heath in the said County. (Repealed by Bagshot and Basingstoke and Odiham Roads Act 1819 (59 Geo. 3. c. vii))
Odiham to Farnham Roads Act 1789 (repealed)	29 Geo. 3. c. 89	19 May 1789
An Act for repairing and widening the Road from Odiham in the County of Southampton, to Farnham in the County of Surrey. (Repealed by Odiham and Farnham Road Act 1832 (2 & 3 Will. 4. c. xxx))
Oxford Roads Act 1789 (repealed)	29 Geo. 3. c. 90	19 May 1789
An Act to enlarge the Term and Powers of an Act passed in the Eighteenth Year of the Reign of His present Majesty, (Note: Stokenchurch and New Woodstock Road Act 1778 (18 Geo. 3. c. 91)) for repairing and widening the Road from Stokenchurch (Note: Stokenchurch, Oxfordshire.) in the County of Oxford, to Wheatley Bridge, (Note: Wheatley Bridge, where the London Road (former A40) crosses the River Thame east of Wheatley, Oxfordshire. 51°44′32″N 1°06′54″W) and from the said Bridge to Enslow Bridge, (Note: Enslow Bridge, where the A4095 road crosses the River Cherwell, west of Enslow, Oxfordshire. 51°51′45″N 1°18′28″W) and from Wheatley Bridge to the Mile-way leading towards Magdalen Bridge; and from the Mile-way leading from Saint Giles's Church near the City of Oxford, by Begbroke to New Woodstock, in the said County; and for making, amending, completing, and keeping in Repair, a Road from the Bottom of Cheyney Lane up Headington Hill, to join the present Enslow Branch of Road in the Parish of Holton, in the said County of Oxford, to be used instead of the present Road up Cheyney Lane and Shotover Hill, to the West End of the Town of Wheatley; and for amending and widening the Road from the West End of the said Town to the said Enslow Branch of Road. (Repealed by Stokenchurch and New Woodstock Road Act 1824 (5 Geo. 4. c. xcix))
Nantwich to Chester Road Act 1789 (repealed)	29 Geo. 3. c. 91	19 May 1789
An Act for enlarging the Term and Powers of an Act of the Ninth Year of His present Majesty, (Note: Stafford and Chester Roads Act 1769 (9 Geo. 3. c. 94)) for repairing and widening the Road from the End of the County of Stafford, in the Post Road towards the City of Chester, (Note: Chester, Cheshire.) through Woor (Note: Woore, Shropshire.) in the County of Salop, to Nantwich (Note: Nantwich, Cheshire.) in the County of Chester, and from Nantwich to Tarporley, (Note: Tarporley, Cheshire.) and from thence through Tarvin (Note: Tarvin, Cheshire.) in the said County of Chester to the said City of Chester, together with a certain other Road therein mentioned, so far as relates to the First District of the said Roads. (Repealed by Stafford and Clotton Road Act 1824 (5 Geo. 4. c. xxxvi))
Lanark and Renfrew Roads Act 1789 (repealed)	29 Geo. 3. c. 92	19 May 1789
An Act for enlarging the Term and Powers of several Acts made in the Twenty-sixth, (Note: Glasgow Roads Act 1753 (26 Geo. 2. c. 90)) Twenty-seventh, (Note: Glasgow Roads Act 1754 (27 Geo. 2. c. 27)) and Thirtieth (Note: Ayr Roads Act 1757 (30 Geo. 2. c. 57)) Years of the Reign of His late Majesty King George the Second, so far as relates to certain Roads leading through the Counties of Lanark and Renfrew. (Repealed by Roads and Bridges (Scotland) Act 1878 (41 & 42 Vict. c. 51) and Local Government (Scotland) Act 1889 (52 & 53 Vict. c. 50))
Chester and Derby Roads Act 1789 (repealed)	29 Geo. 3. c. 93	19 May 1789
An Act for amending, widening, and keeping in Repair the Road leading from Congleton to Colley Bridge, and from the said Bridge to Smithy Green, in the Parish of Prestbury, in the County of Chester; and for setting out and making new Roads from Smithy Green aforesaid, to join a Branch from the Leek Turnpike Road at Thatchmarsh Bottom, in the Parish of Hartington in the County of Derby, and from the first mentioned Road to the Havannah Mills. (Repealed by Road from Congleton to Thatchmarsh Bottom (Cheshire, Derbyshire) Act 1830 (11 Geo. 4 & 1 Will. 4. c. xxxii))
Barton and Brandon Road Act 1789 (repealed)	29 Geo. 3. c. 94	19 May 1789
An Act for enlarging the Term and Powers of an Act of the Tenth Year of His present Majesty, (Note: Barton and Brandon Road Act 1770 (10 Geo. 3. c. 65)) for repairing the Road from the Bridge on the Old River at Barton (Note: Barton Mills, Suffolk. 52°20′09″N 0°31′55″E) to Brandon Bridge (Note: Brandon Bridge carrying the A1065 Brandon High Street across the River Little Ouse, Brandon, Suffolk. 52°27′04″N 0°37′23″E) in the County of Suffolk. (Repealed by Barton and Brandon Bridge Road (Suffolk) Act 1831 (1 & 2 Will. 4. c. xix))
Stourbridge Worcester Roads Act 1789 (repealed)	29 Geo. 3. c. 95	19 May 1789
An Act for more effectually amending and keeping in Repair several Roads leading from the late Market House in Stourbridge in the County of Worcester; and for repealing certain Acts of Parliament, so far as relates to the said Roads, and for amending the Road from Coalbourne Brook, through Wollaston to Churchill Field Corner, in the Counties of Worcester and Stafford. (Repealed by Stourbridge Roads Act 1821 (1 & 2 Geo. 4. c. lxxxviii))
Middlesex Roads Act 1789 (repealed)	29 Geo. 3. c. 96	24 June 1789
An Act for more effectually repairing the Roads from the Stones End in the Parish of Saint Leonard, Shoreditch, to the furthermost Part of the Northern Road in the Parish of Enfield; and from the Place where the Watch House in Edmonton formerly stood, to the Market Place in Enfield, in the County of Middlesex, and for lighting, watching, and watering Part thereof; and for repealing certain Acts of Parliament relating to the said Roads; and for amending, widening, and keeping in Repair the Road from Newington Green to Bush Hill, in the Parish of Edmonton, in the said County. (Repealed by Roads from Stones End and from Newington Green Act 1815 (55 Geo. 3. c. lix))
Cumberland Roads Act 1789	29 Geo. 3. c. 97	24 June 1789
An Act for enlarging the Term of and amending an Act of the Seventh Year of His present Majesty, (Note: Cumberland Roads Act 1766 (7 Geo. 3. c. 83)) for repairing and widening the Road from Shaddon Gate near Carlisle, to the present Turnpike Road at Mulaside, and from a Place in the said Turnpike Road between Binsey Mires and North Raw Gate, to join the Turnpike Road at Skillbeck, in the County of Cumberland.
Doncaster to Salter's Brook Road Act 1789 (repealed)	29 Geo. 3. c. 98	24 June 1789
An Act for continuing the Term, and altering and enlarging the Powers of Two Acts passed in the Fourteenth Year of the Reign of His late Majesty (Note: Doncaster to Salter's Brook Road Act 1740 (14 Geo. 2. c. 31)) and the Second Year of the Reign of His present Majesty King George the Third, (Note: Doncaster to Salter's Brook Road Act 1762 (2 Geo. 3. c. 71)) so far as the same relate to repairing the Road from Doncaster, through the Parish of Peniston, in the County of York, to Salter's Brook, in the County of Chester. (Repealed by Road from Doncaster to Salter's Brook Bridge Act 1826 (7 Geo. 4. c. cxxx))
Tarporley to Weverham Road Act 1789 (repealed)	29 Geo. 3. c. 99	24 June 1789
An Act for enlarging the Term and Powers of an Act passed in the Twenty-second Year of the Reign of His present Majesty, (Note: Tarporley to Weverham Road Act 1782 (22 Geo. 3. c. 106)) for repairing and widening the Road from Tarporley, in the County Palatine of Chester, to Acton Bridge, near Weaverham, in the same County. (Repealed by Tarporley and Weverham Road (Cheshire) Act 1823 (4 Geo. 4. c. lxxxii))
Kent Roads (No. 2) Act 1789 (repealed)	29 Geo. 3. c. 100	24 June 1789
An Act for continuing the Term and altering and enlarging the Powers of an Act passed in the Seventh Year of the Reign of His present Majesty, (Note: Kent Roads Act 1766 (7 Geo. 3. c. 91)) for repairing and widening the Road from the Brick Kilns on East Malling Heath, to the Turnpike Road on Pembury Green, and from Brand Bridges to the Four Wents near Matfield Green, in the County of Kent. (Repealed by East Malling Heath and Mereworth and Hadlow Road Act 1829 (10 Geo. 4. c. lvi))
Somerset Roads Act 1789 (repealed)	29 Geo. 3. c. 101	24 June 1789
An Act to enlarge the Term and Powers of an Act of the Eighth Year of His present Majesty, (Note: Somerset Roads Act 1768 (8 Geo. 3. c. 53)) for repairing and widening the Road from Buckland Dinham to the End of the Parish of Timsbury, and also the Road from Midsomer Norton, to the End of the Parish of Norton Saint Phillips; and also the Road from Tucker's Grave, to the Road leading from Wellow, to a Place known by the Name of The Red Post, in the County of Somerset; and for amending, widening, and keeping in Repair the Road from Kilmersdon, in the said County, to join the Road from Buckland Dinham aforesaid, in the Street of Radstock, in the said County. (Repealed by Roads from Radstock Act 1830 (11 Geo. 4 & 1 Will. 4. c. xxxiv))
Worcester Roads Act 1789 (repealed)	29 Geo. 3. c. 102	24 June 1789
An Act for amending, widening, and keeping in Repair the Road leading from the Cross Hands in Teddington Field, in the Parish of Overbury, in the County of Worcester, to the London Turnpike Road between Evesham and Pershore, in the said County. (Repealed by Evesham and Cheltenham Turnpike Roads Act 1824 (5 Geo. 4. c. cxl))
Evesham Roads Act 1789 (repealed)	29 Geo. 3. c. 103	24 June 1789
An Act for continuing the Term and varying the Powers of certain Acts of Parliament, of the First, (Note: Evesham Roads Act 1727 (1 Geo. 2. St. 2. c. 11)) Seventeenth, (Note: Worcester Roads Act 1743 (17 Geo. 2. c. 13)) and Thirtieth (Note: Worcester, Warwick and Gloucester Roads Act 1757 (30 Geo. 2. c. 64)) Years of His late Majesty, for repairing several Roads leading from the Borough of Evesham; and several other Roads in the Counties of Worcester and Gloucester. (Repealed by Evesham Roads Act 1822 (3 Geo. 4. c. lxix) (Note: Incorrectly cited as "3 Geo. 4. c. cxl" in the Chronological Table of the Statutes.))
Hereford and Gloucester Roads Act 1789 (repealed)	29 Geo. 3. c. 104	13 July 1789
An Act for more effectually repairing several Roads leading from Ledbury, in the County of Hereford, and the Road through the Parish of Bromesberrow, in the County of Gloucester, and Corse Lawn, till it joins the Road from Gloucester to Worcester. (Repealed by Roads from Ledbury (Herefordshire, Gloucestershire) Act 1833 (3 & 4 Will. 4. c. lviii) (Note: Cited as "3 & 4 Will. c. lviii", without the sovereign's regnal number, in the Chronological Table of the Statutes.))
Edinburgh Roads Act 1789 (repealed)	29 Geo. 3. c. 105	13 July 1789
An Act for enlarging the Terms and Powers of several Acts of the Twenty-fourth (Note: Edinburgh and Leith Road Act 1750 (24 Geo. 2. c. 35)) and Twenty-eighth (Note: Edinburgh Roads Act 1755 (28 Geo. 2. c. 39)) Years of His late Majesty's Reign, and of the Fourth Year of His present Majesty's Reign, (Note: Edinburgh and Linlighgow Roads Act 1764 (4 Geo. 3. c. 86)) for repairing the High Roads in the County of Edinburgh, and for making the same more effectual. (Repealed by Edinburgh Turnpike Roads Act 1835 (5 & 6 Will. 4. c. lxii))
Worcester and Warwick Roads Act 1789	29 Geo. 3. c. 106	13 July 1789
An Act for enlarging the Term and Powers of an Act of the Seventh Year of His present Majesty, (Note: Warwick and Worcester Roads Act 1766 (7 Geo. 3. c. 81)) for repairing and widening the Road from the Turnpike Road at Hatton, near the Borough of Warwick, through King's Norton, in the County of Worcester, and to the Upper End of Gannow Green, in the Parish of Bromsgrove, and to the Bell Inn, in the Parish of Bellbroughton, in the said County of Worcester, so far as relates to the Road between the said Turnpike Road at Hatton and Hockley Heath, in the County of Warwick.
Lancaster Roads Act 1789 (repealed)	29 Geo. 3. c. 107	13 July 1789
An Act for amending, widening, turning, varying, altering, and keeping in Repair, the Road from a certain Dwelling House in Bury, now or late in the Occupation of William Walker, Gentleman, to Hastingden, and from thence to the East End of Salford Bridge, in Blackburn, and also the Road from Haslingden aforesaid, to the East End of Cockshut Bridge, in the Town of Whalley, and also the Road from Haslingden aforesaid, through New Church and Bacup to Todmorden, and for making a Road from the said Road between Bury and Haslingden, in the Township of Walmersley, to the River Irwell, and for building a Bridge over the said River, all in the County Palatine of Lancaster. (Repealed by Haslingden and Todmorden Road and Branches Act 1800 (39 & 40 Geo. 3. c. xix), Road from Haslingden to Todmorden Act 1815 (55 Geo. 3. c. xiv) and Roads from Bury to Blackburn and Branches Act 1827 (7 & 8 Geo. 4. c. xxviii))
Hereford Roads Act 1789 (repealed)	29 Geo. 3. c. 108	13 July 1789
An Act for enlarging the Term and Powers of Three Acts passed in the Third (Note: Hereford Roads Act 1729 (3 Geo. 2. c. 18)) and Twenty-second (Note: Hereford Roads Act 1748 (22 Geo. 2. c. 18)) Years of His late Majesty King George the Second, and in the Ninth Year of the Reign of His present Majesty, (Note: Hereford Roads Act 1769 (9 Geo. 3. c. 90)) for repairing the several Roads leading into the City of Hereford; and for amending the Roads to Llancloudy Hill and Langua Bridge; and also for making and keeping in Repair, the Roads from the said City of Hereford, to Hoarwithy Passage, through the several Townships or Places therein mentioned. (Repealed by Hereford Roads Act 1810 (50 Geo. 3. c. lxxiii))
Yorkshire Roads Act 1789 (repealed)	29 Geo. 3. c. 109	13 July 1789
An Act for continuing the Term, and altering and enlarging the Powers of so much of an Act passed in the Eighth Year of the Reign of His present Majesty, (Note: Yorkshire Roads Act 1768 (8 Geo. 3. c. 54)) as relates to amending and widening the Road from the City of York, to the Top of Oswaldkirk Bank, and for discharging the Trustees from the Care of the Road, from the said Road in Sutton Field through Craike, towards Oulston, to the Extent of the Lordship of Craike, in the County of York. (Repealed by York and Oswaldkirk Bank Road Act 1825 (6 Geo. 4. c. cl))
Heywood and Prestwich Road Act 1789 (repealed)	29 Geo. 3. c. 110	31 July 1789
An Act for repairing and widening the Road from Rochdale Lane End, in the Village of Heywood, in the Parish of Bury, to a Place called The Land's End, in the Parish of Prestwich, in the County Palatine of Lancaster. (Repealed by Heywood and Prestwich Road Act 1819 (59 Geo. 3. c. xciii) and Annual Turnpike Acts Continuance Act 1873 (36 & 37 Vict. c. 90))

=== Private acts ===
Short title	Citation	Royal assent
Long title
Bradley Inclosure Act 1789	29 Geo. 3. c. 1 Pr.	24 March 1789
An Act for dividing and enclosing certain Ings or Meadow Ground called Bradley Ings, and Two Moors or Commons called Upper Bradley Common and Lower Bradley Common, within the Manor of Bradley, in the Parish of Kildwick, in the West Riding of the County of York.
Willis Name and Arms Act 1789	29 Geo. 3. c. 2 Pr.	24 March 1789
An Act to enable Ralph Willis Esquire, (lately called Ralph Earle,) and the Heirs Male of his Body, to take the Surname and bear the Arms of Willis only, pursuant to the Will of Daniel Willis Esquire, deceased.
Wendt's Naturalization Act 1789	29 Geo. 3. c. 3 Pr.	24 March 1789
An Act for naturalizing Nathaniel Wendt.
Naturalization of John Klopfer, John Vogel, and Henry Siffken.	29 Geo. 3. c. 4 Pr.	24 March 1789
An Act for naturalizing John Gottlieb Klopfer, John William Vogel, and Henry Siffken.
Naturalization of Jacob and James Siordet.	29 Geo. 3. c. 5 Pr.	24 March 1789
An Act for the Naturalization of Jacob Siordet and James Lewis Siordet.
Pourtales' Naturalization Act 1789	29 Geo. 3. c. 6 Pr.	24 March 1789
An Act for the Naturalization of Lewis Pourtales.
Sheridan's Divorce Act 1789	29 Geo. 3. c. 7 Pr.	8 April 1789
An Act to dissolve the Marriage of Henry Fortick Sheridan Esquire, with Lydia Fergussone his now Wife, and to enable him to marry again; and for other Purposes therein mentioned.
Lower Swell Inclosure Act 1789	29 Geo. 3. c. 8 Pr.	8 April 1789
An Act for dividing and enclosing the Open Fields, Downs, Commons, and Commonable Lands, in the Manor and Parish of Lower Swell, in the County of Gloucester.
Broughton Inclosure Act 1789	29 Geo. 3. c. 9 Pr.	8 April 1789
An Act for dividing, allotting, and enclosing the Open and Common Fields and Common Downs, Common Pastures, Common Meadows, Common Marshes, and other Commonable Lands and Grounds within the Parish of Broughton, in the County of Southampton.
Thrussington Inclosure Act 1789	29 Geo. 3. c. 10 Pr.	8 April 1789
An Act for dividing, allotting, and enclosing the Open Common Fields, and several other Lands and Grounds in the Parish of Thrussington, otherwise Thurstanton, otherwise Trussington, in the County of Leicester.
Secretan's Naturalization Act 1789	29 Geo. 3. c. 11 Pr.	8 April 1789
An Act for naturalizing Frederick Samuel Secretan, otherwise called Samuel Frederick Secretan.
Hallett's Estate Act 1789	29 Geo. 3. c. 12 Pr.	19 May 1789
An Act for vesting the settled Estates of William Hallett Esquire, to exchange or sell the same; and for laying out the Money arising by the Sale in the Purchase of other Messuages, Lands, and Hereditaments, to be settled to the same Uses.
Philipps's Estate Act 1789	29 Geo. 3. c. 13 Pr.	19 May 1789
An Act for vesting certain Estates devised by the Will of Sir John Philipps Baronet, deceased, in Trustees, to be sold, and for investing the Money arising from the Sale thereof, in the Purchase of other Lands, to be settled to the Uses devised by the said Will, of the Estates so to be vested in Trustees to be sold.
Wiswell Moor Inclosure Act 1789	29 Geo. 3. c. 14 Pr.	19 May 1789
An Act for dividing and enclosing a certain Common called Wiswell Moor, in the Township of Wiswell and Parish of Whalley, in the County Palatine of Lancaster.
Stanwell and Hammonds or Shipcot (Middlesex) Inclosure Act 1789	29 Geo. 3. c. 15 Pr.	19 May 1789
An Act for dividing and enclosing the several Open Fields, Arable and Meadow Grounds and Lammas Lands and Commons, Moors, and Waste Lands, within the Manors of Stanwell and Hammonds, otherwise Shipcot, and in the Parish of Stanwell, in the County of Middlesex.
Putton Inclosure Act 1789	29 Geo. 3. c. 16 Pr.	19 May 1789
An Act for dividing and allotting the Open and Common Fields, and other Commonable Lands and Grounds in Putton, alias Podington, in the Village or Tything of Easton, in the Parish of Chickerill, alias West Chickerill, in the County of Dorset.
Mechen Iscoed and Plas-y-Dinas (Montgomeryshire) Inclosure Act 1789	29 Geo. 3. c. 17 Pr.	19 May 1789
An Act for dividing, allotting, and enclosing the Common Fields and Waste Lands within the Manors of Mechen-Iscoed and Plas y Dinas, in the County of Montgomery.
Urchfont and Beechingstoke (Wiltshire) inclosures.	29 Geo. 3. c. 18 Pr.	19 May 1789
An Act for dividing, allotting, and laying in Severalty the Open and Common Fields, Common Meadows, Common Pastures, Open Downs, and other Commonable Lands within the Parishes of Urchfont and Beechingstoke, in the County of Wilts.
Grooby Inclosure Act 1789	29 Geo. 3. c. 19 Pr.	19 May 1789
An Act for dividing, allotting, and enclosing the Open Fields, Meadows, Pastures, Commons, Commonable Places, and Waste Lands, in the Lordship or Liberties of Grooby, in the Parish of Ratby and County of Leicester.
Whatton Inclosure Act 1789	29 Geo. 3. c. 20 Pr.	19 May 1789
An Act for dividing and enclosing the Open and Common Fields, Common Meadows, Common Pastures, and Waste Grounds, in the Parish of Whatton, in the County of Nottingham.
Langcliffe Inclosure Act 1789	29 Geo. 3. c. 21 Pr.	19 May 1789
An Act for dividing and enclosing certain Stinted Pastures within the Township of Langcliffe in the West Riding of the County of York.
Buckworth's Name Act 1789	29 Geo. 3. c. 22 Pr.	19 May 1789
An Act to enable Charles Watkin John Buckworth Esquire, and the Heirs Male of his Body, to take and use the Surname and bear the Arms of Shakerley, pursuant to the Will of Peter Shakerley Esquire, deceased.
Jackson's Naturalization Act 1789	29 Geo. 3. c. 23 Pr.	19 May 1789
An Act for naturalizing Anna Elizabeth Jackson.
Demezy's Naturalization Act 1789	29 Geo. 3. c. 24 Pr.	19 May 1789
An Act for naturalizing Anthony Demezy.
Reverend John Lowth and Earl of Winchilsea tithes dispute settlement.	29 Geo. 3. c. 25 Pr.	24 June 1789
An Act for establishing, confirming, and carrying into Execution certain Articles of Agreement between the Reverend John Lowth, Vicar of the Parish of Burley on the Hill, in the County of Rutland, and the Right Honourable George Earl of Winchelsea and Nottingham and thereby settling all Disputes and Differences which have arisen in consequence of a Claim of Tythes made by the said Vicar.
Honywood's Estate Act 1789	29 Geo. 3. c. 26 Pr.	24 June 1789
An Act for allowing Timber to be cut upon certain Estates settled by the Will of General Philip Honywood, and for applying the Money to arise therefrom in paying off a Mortgage now due and owing on the same Estates, and laying out the Remainder in Purchases of other Estates, to be settled to the same Uses.
Fitzherbert's Estate Act 1789	29 Geo. 3. c. 27 Pr.	24 June 1789
An Act for vesting certain Parts of the settled Estates of Bazil Fitzherbert Esquire, in Trustees to be sold, and for applying the Money arising from the Sale thereof, in Discharge of the Incumbrances affecting the same; and for laying out the Residue in the Purchase of other Lands, to be settled to the Uses of the Parts of the settled Estates remaining unsold.
Enabling Richard Moland, as guardian of his daughters, to grant building leases and lay out access roads at Birmingham and Aston (Warwickshire).	29 Geo. 3. c. 28 Pr.	24 June 1789
An Act to enable Richard Moland Esquire, natural Guardian of his Infant Daughters Elizabeth Moland, Anna Maria Moland, Lætitia Martha Moland, and Margaret Lucy Moland, and in case of his Death, the future Guardian or Guardians of his said Daughters, during their Minorities, to grant Building Leases of One undivided Moiety of certain Lands in the Parishes of Birmingham, and Aston near Birmingham, in the County of Warwick; and to lay out convenient Streets, Ways, and Passages to the Buildings to be erected thereon.
Slaney's Estate Act 1789	29 Geo. 3. c. 29 Pr.	24 June 1789
An Act for vesting divers undivided Parts of certain Estates in Staffordshire, the settled Property of the Reverend Jonas Slaney and Mary his Wife, in Trustees to be sold; and for laying out the Purchase Money in entire Estates, to be settled to the same Uses.
Hales's Estate Act 1789	29 Geo. 3. c. 30 Pr.	24 June 1789
An Act for vesting the Estate, late of Sir Thomas Pym Hales Baronet, deceased, in the County of Kent, in Trustees to be sold and disposed of for the Payment of certain Incumbrances affecting the same; and for other Purposes therein mentioned.
Earl Tylney's Estate Act 1789	29 Geo. 3. c. 31 Pr.	24 June 1789
An Act for vesting Part of the Estates devised by the Will of John Earl Tylney, in London, Middlesex, and Essex, in Trustees to be sold, and for laying out the Money thence arising, in other Estates, to be settled in lieu thereof to the same Uses.
Foster's Estate Act 1789	29 Geo. 3. c. 32 Pr.	24 June 1789
An Act for effectuating the Sale of certain Estates late of John Foster, deceased.
Northey's Estate Act 1789	29 Geo. 3. c. 33 Pr.	24 June 1789
An Act for vesting Part of the settled Estates of William Northey Esquire, in the County of Wilts, in Trustees to be sold; and for laying out the Purchase Money in other Estates, to be settled to the same Uses.
Webb's Estate Act 1789	29 Geo. 3. c. 34 Pr.	24 June 1789
An Act for effectuating the Sale of the Freehold Estate of Nathaniel Webb Esquire, and Harriet Ellen his Wife, an Infant, at Boreham, in the County of Essex.
Dickenson's Estate Act 1789	29 Geo. 3. c. 35 Pr.	24 June 1789
An Act for carrying into Execution an Agreement for Sale of the Brewhouse and Hereditaments in and near Golden Lane, London, lately belonging to Joseph Dickenson Esquire, deceased, and for applying Two Thirds of the Money agreed to be paid for the Purchase of the Freehold Part of the said Brewhouse and Hereditaments, in the Purchase of Freehold Hereditaments, to be settled in Manner in the said Act mentioned, and for such other Purposes as in the said Act mentioned.
Benjamin and Ann Parker's and John and Mary Robbins's marriage settlements: enabling life tenants and others to grant leases; also other provisions.	29 Geo. 3. c. 36 Pr.	24 June 1789
An Act to enable the Tenants for Life, and other Persons in Possession, or entitled to the Rents of the Estates comprized in certain Indentures of Settlement, One made pursuant to Articles entered into upon the Marriage of Benjamin Parker of Birmingham, in the County of Warwick, Gentleman, with Ann his Wife; and the others made pursuant to Articles entered into upon the Marriage of John Robbins of Birmingham, aforesaid, Gentleman, with Mary his Wife, to grant Leases, and for other Purposes.
Lloyd's Estate Act 1789	29 Geo. 3. c. 37 Pr.	24 June 1789
An Act to enable the Reverend William Lloyd to complete his Contract with Jacob Bosanquet Esquire, for Sale of Part of his Settled Estates, and vesting the remaining Part of the same Estates in Trustees for Sale.
Ingleby's Estate Act 1789	29 Geo. 3. c. 38 Pr.	24 June 1789
An Act to enable Sir John Ingilby Baronet to charge his Settled Estates, in the County of York, in the Manner therein mentioned.
Bine's Estate Act 1789	29 Geo. 3. c. 39 Pr.	24 June 1789
An Act for vesting certain Parts of the Real Estates late of Francis Bine, of the Town and County of the Town of Kingston-upon-Hull, Merchant, deceased, in Trustees, to sell and convey the same; and for laying out the Money arising by such Sale, in the Manner and upon the Trusts therein mentioned.
Odiham Inclosure Act 1789	29 Geo. 3. c. 40 Pr.	24 June 1789
An Act for dividing, allotting, and enclosing the Open and Common Fields, Common Downs, Waste Lands, and other Commonable Places, within the several Tythings of Odiham, Northwarnborough, Hillside, Rye, and Stapely, in the Parish of Odiham, in the County of Southampton.
Coniston Inclosure Act 1789	29 Geo. 3. c. 41 Pr.	24 June 1789
An Act for dividing and enclosing the Open Arable Fields, Meadows, Pastures, and Waste Grounds, in the Township of Coniston, in the Parish of Swine, in Holderness, in the East Riding of the County of York.
Berwick St. James and Fisherton Anger (Wiltshire) Inclosure Act 1789	29 Geo. 3. c. 42 Pr.	24 June 1789
An Act for dividing and allotting the Open and Common Fields and other Commonable Lands and Grounds, in the Parishes of Berwick Saint James and Fisherton Anger, in the County of Wilts.
Walpole (Norfolk) Embanking and Inclosure Act 1789	29 Geo. 3. c. 43 Pr.	24 June 1789
An Act for embanking the Common Salt Marsh, within the Township of Walpole, in the County of Norfolk, and for dividing and enclosing the same, and several other Commons within the said Township.
Banham Inclosure Act 1789	29 Geo. 3. c. 44 Pr.	24 June 1789
An Act for dividing and enclosing the Heaths, Fen Grounds, Commons, and Waste Lands, within the Parish of Banham, in the County of Norfolk.
Normanby next Spittal (Lincolnshire) Inclosure Act 1789	29 Geo. 3. c. 45 Pr.	24 June 1789
An Act for dividing and enclosing the Open and Common Fields, Common Meadows, Common Pastures, and Waste Lands, in the Parish of Normanby next Spittal, in the County of Lincoln.
South Kilworth Inclosure Act 1789	29 Geo. 3. c. 46 Pr.	24 June 1789
An Act for dividing and enclosing the Open and Common Fields, Meadows, and Commons, of and within the Parish of South Kilworth, in the County of Leicester.
Bourton and Watchfield (Berkshire) Inclosure Act 1789	29 Geo. 3. c. 47 Pr.	24 June 1789
An Act for dividing, allotting, and enclosing the Open Common Fields, Common Meadows, Common Pastures, Waste Lands, and Commonable Places, within the Hamlets of Bourton and Watchfield, in the Parish of Shrivenham, in the County of Berks.
Roberts' Name Act 1789	29 Geo. 3. c. 48 Pr.	24 June 1789
An Act to enable Arthur Annesley Roberts Esquire and the Heirs of his Body, to take, use, and bear the Surname and Arms of Powell, pursuant to the Will of John Powell Esquire, deceased.
Nantes' Naturalization Act 1789	29 Geo. 3. c. 49 Pr.	24 June 1789
An Act for naturalizing Henry Nantes.
Gemsa's Naturalization Act 1789	29 Geo. 3. c. 50 Pr.	24 June 1789
An Act for naturalizing Christopher Gemsa.
Parson's Estate Act 1789	29 Geo. 3. c. 51 Pr.	13 July 1789
An Act for vesting divers Manors, Messuages, Lands, and Hereditaments, in the Counties of Stafford and Salop, late the Estate of Elizabeth Parson, deceased, Wife of John Parson Esquire, in Trustees to be sold, for the Purposes therein mentioned.
Arabin's Divorce Act 1789	29 Geo. 3. c. 52 Pr.	13 July 1789
An Act to dissolve the Marriage of William John Arabin Esquire, with Henrietta Molyneux, his now Wife, and to enable him to marry again; and for other Purposes therein mentioned.
Bramley Inclosure Act 1789	29 Geo. 3. c. 53 Pr.	13 July 1789
An Act for dividing and enclosing the Commons and Waste Grounds, within the Manor or Township of Bramley, in the Parish of Leeds, and County of York.
Marston-upon-Dove Inclosure Act 1789	29 Geo. 3. c. 54 Pr.	13 July 1789
An Act for dividing and enclosing the Common and Open Fields, Meadows, Pastures, and Common or Moor, within the Liberties of Marston upon Dove, Hatton, Hoon, and Hoon Hay, in the Parish of Marston upon Dove, in the County of Derby.
Thorpe Inclosure Act 1789	29 Geo. 3. c. 55 Pr.	13 July 1789
An Act for dividing and enclosing several Open Fields and stinted Pastures, within the Township of Thorpe, in the Parish of Burnsall, in the West Riding of the County of York.
Sibford Ferris Inclosure Act 1789	29 Geo. 3. c. 56 Pr.	13 July 1789
An Act for dividing and enclosing the Open and Common Fields, and other Commonable Lands and Grounds, within the Hamlet and Liberties of Sibford Ferris, in the Parish of Swalcliffe, in the County of Oxford.
Arnold Inclosure Act 1789	29 Geo. 3. c. 57 Pr.	13 July 1789
An Act for dividing and enclosing the Open Fields, Meadows, Forest, Commons, and Waste Lands, within the Parish of Arnold, in the County of Nottingham.
Osmaston-next-Derby Inclosure Act 1789	29 Geo. 3. c. 58 Pr.	13 July 1789
An Act for dividing, allotting, and enclosing all the Open Fields, Meadows, Commons, and Waste Lands, in the Lordship or Liberties of Osmaston next Derby, in the County of Derby, except only a certain Meadow there called The Moor Meadow, and a certain Commonable Place called Sinfin Moor.
Cold Kirkby Inclosure Act 1789	29 Geo. 3. c. 59 Pr.	13 July 1789
An Act for dividing and enclosing the Open Fields, stinted Pasture, and other Commonable Lands, within the Parish of Cold Kirkby, in the North Riding of the County of York.
Denton Inclosure Act 1789	29 Geo. 3. c. 60 Pr.	13 July 1789
An Act for dividing, allotting, and enclosing the several Open Common Fields, Meadows, Common Pastures, and other Commonable Lands and Grounds, within the Manor and Parish of Denton, in the County of Lincoln.
Hemmington Inclosure Act 1789	29 Geo. 3. c. 61 Pr.	13 July 1789
An Act for dividing and enclosing the Open or Common Fields, Meadows, Pastures, and Waste Grounds, within the Manor or Lordship of Hemmington, in the Parish of Lockington, and County of Leicester.
Baron de Robeck's Naturalization Act 1789	29 Geo. 3. c. 62 Pr.	13 July 1789
An Act for naturalizing John Henry Fock, called Baron de Robeck.
Lecornu's Naturalization Act 1789	29 Geo. 3. c. 63 Pr.	13 July 1789
An Act for naturalizing Peter Lecornu.
Wyberton Inclosure Act 1789	29 Geo. 3. c. 64 Pr.	31 July 1789
An Act for dividing, allotting, and enclosing the several Parcels of Common Fen, and other Commonable Lands and Waste Grounds, within or belonging to the Parish of Wyberton, in the Parts of Holland, in the County of Lincoln.
Harston Inclosure Act 1789	29 Geo. 3. c. 65 Pr.	31 July 1789
An Act for dividing and enclosing the several Open and Common Fields, a Common Pasture, and several Waste Grounds, within the Parish of Harston, in the County of Leicester.
Saladin's Naturalization Act 1789	29 Geo. 3. c. 66 Pr.	31 July 1789
An Act for naturalizing Anthony Charles Benjamin Saladin.
Ashted or Great Ashted Manor (Surrey) Act 1789	29 Geo. 3. c. 67 Pr.	11 August 1789
An Act for vesting the Manor of Ashted, otherwise Great Ashted, and several Messuages, Lands, Tenements, and Hereditaments, in the County of Surrey, therein mentioned, in Trustees to be sold and conveyed, pursuant to an Agreement for that Purpose; and for investing Part of the Money to arise by such Sale, in the Purchase of other Lands and Hereditaments, to be settled to the several Uses therein mentioned, or referred unto; and for other Purposes therein expressed.
Naturalization of Henry de Bons, Francis Blanchenay and James Chauvet Act 1789	29 Geo. 3. c. 68 Pr.	11 August 1789
An Act for naturalizing Henry de Bons, Francis Blanchenay, and James Chauvet.

=== Sources ===
- Pickering, Danby, ed. (1787). "Anno vicesimo nono Georgii III". The Statutes at Large. Vol. 36. Cambridge: John Archdeacon. pp. 587–814 – via Google Books.
- Journals of the House of Commons. Vol. 44. London: His Majesty's Stationery Office. 1803. pp. 3–648 – via Google Books.
- Journal of the House of Lords. Vol. 38: 1787-1790. London: His Majesty's Stationery Office. 1830. pp. 265–525 – via British History Online.
- Chronological Table of and Index to the Statutes. Vol. 1: To the End of the Session 59 Vict. Sess. 2 (1895) (13th ed.). London: Her Majesty's Stationery Office. 1896. pp. 148–149 – via Google Books.
- Chronological Table of the Statutes: Covering the Period from 1235 to the End of 1971. London: Her Majesty's Stationery Office. 1972. pp. 173–175. ISBN 978-0-11-840096-1 – via Google Books.

== See also ==
- List of acts of the Parliament of Great Britain
