= River Lune Navigation Act 1749 =

Act of the Parliament of Great Britain

- Act of Parliament
- Parliament of Great Britain
- Long title: An Act for improving the Navigation of the River Loyne, otherwise called Lune; and for building a Quay or Wharf near the Town of Lancaster in the County Palatine of Lancaster.
- Citation: 23 Geo. 2. c. 12
- Territorial extent: Great Britain

Dates
- Royal assent: 14 March 1750
- Commencement: 16 November 1749 (Note: Start of session.)
- Repealed: 21 November 1967
Other legislation
| Amended by | River Lune Navigation Act 1772; River Lune Navigation Act 1789; Loyne or Lune River Navigation and Lancaster Quay Act 1807 |
| Repealed by | Lancaster Port Commission Revision Order 1967 |

Status: Repealed

Text of statute as originally enacted

River Lune Navigation Act 1772
- Act of Parliament
- Parliament of Great Britain
- Long title: An Act to explain and amend an Act, made in the Twenty-third Year of the Reign of His late Majesty King George the Second, for improving the Navigation of the River Loyne, otherwise called Lune; and for building a Quay or Wharf near the Town of Lancaster, in the County Palatine of Lancaster.
- Citation: 12 Geo. 3. c. 81
- Territorial extent: Great Britain

Dates
- Royal assent: 1 April 1772
- Commencement: 21 January 1772
- Repealed: 21 November 1967
Other legislation
| Amends | River Lune Navigation Act 1749 |
| Amended by | River Lune Navigation Act 1789; Loyne or Lune River Navigation and Lancaster Quay Act 1807 |
| Repealed by | Lancaster Port Commission Revision Order 1967 |

Status: Repealed

Text of statute as originally enacted

River Lune Navigation Act 1789
- Act of Parliament
- Parliament of Great Britain
- Long title: An Act to explain, amend, and render more effectual several Acts made in the Twenty-third Year of the Reign of His late Majesty King George the Second, and the Twelfth Year of the Reign of His present Majesty, for improving the Navigation of the River Loyne, otherwise called Lune; and for building a Quay or Wharf near the Town of Lancaster, in the County Palatine of Lancaster; and for other Purposes therein mentioned.
- Citation: 29 Geo. 3. c. 39
- Territorial extent: Great Britain

Dates
- Royal assent: 24 June 1789
- Commencement: 20 November 1788
- Repealed: 21 November 1967
Other legislation
| Amends | River Lune Navigation Act 1749; River Lune Navigation Act 1772 |
| Amended by | Loyne or Lune River Navigation and Lancaster Quay Act 1807 |
| Repealed by | Lancaster Port Commission Revision Order 1967 |

Status: Repealed

Text of statute as originally enacted

Loyne or Lune River Navigation and Lancaster Quay Act 1807
- Act of Parliament
- Parliament of Great Britain
- Long title: An Act to explain, amend, and render more effectual, several Acts, for improving the Navigation of the River Loyne, otherwise Lune, and for building a Quay or Wharf near Lancaster, in the County Palatine of Lancaster.
- Citation: 43 Geo. 3 Sess. 2. c. xxxvii
- Territorial extent: United Kingdom

Dates
- Royal assent: 1 August 1807
- Commencement: 1 August 1807 (Note: The Acts of Parliament (Commencement) Act 1793.)
- Repealed: 21 November 1967
Other legislation
| Amends | River Lune Navigation Act 1749; River Lune Navigation Act 1772; River Lune Navigation Act 1789 |
| Repealed by | Lancaster Port Commission Revision Order 1967 |

Status: Repealed

The River Lune Navigation Act 1749 (23 Geo. 2. c. 12) was an act of the Parliament of Great Britain. The act recognised the emergence of the Port of Lancaster as a "very considerable" port involved in foreign trade, particularly the slave trade, referred to as the West Indies trade. The act referred to "the great Advancement of the Revenue, and the Improvement of the Trade and Navigation of this Kingdom" that this facilitated.

With the consent of James Fenton – the incumbent vicar of Priory Church of St Mary, the parish church of Lancaster, a certain portion of the vicarage lands should be used to create a quay, with an annual some of 14 guineas being paid to the vicar.

The act provided a schedule of duties to be raised from shipping coming in and out of the Port of Lancaster.

Provision was made for the setting up of the Lancaster Port Commission, with 16 commissioners empowered to manage the quay, collect the duties and ensure that proper accounts for these transactions are maintained.

== Subsequent developments ==
Lancaster Port Commission Revision Order 1967 (Note: Section 1.)
- Statutory Instrument
- Parliament of the United Kingdom
- Citation: SI 1968/532
- Territorial extent: United Kingdom

Dates
- Made: 21 November 1967
Other legislation
| Repeals/revokes | River Lune Navigation Act 1749; River Lune Navigation Act 1772; River Lune Navigation Act 1789; Loyne or Lune River Navigation and Lancaster Quay Act 1807 |
| Amended by | Lancaster Port Commission Revision Order 1985; Lancaster Port Commission Harbour Revision Order 1994; Lancaster Port Commission Harbour Revision (Constitution) Order 2003 |
| Relates to | Harbours Act 1964 |

Status: Amended

Text of statute as originally enacted

Lancaster Port Commission Revision Order 1985 (Note: Section 1(1).)
- Statutory Instrument
- Parliament of the United Kingdom
- Citation: SI 1985/1440
- Territorial extent: United Kingdom

Dates
- Made: 12 September 1985
Other legislation
| Amends | Lancaster Port Commission Revision Order 1967 |
| Amended by | Lancaster Port Commission Harbour Revision Order 1994 |
| Relates to | Harbours Act 1964; Lancaster Port Commission Harbour Revision (Constitution) Order 2003 |

Status: Amended

Text of statute as originally enacted

Lancaster Port Commission Harbour Revision Order 1994
- Statutory Instrument
- Parliament of the United Kingdom
- Citation: SI 1994/1647
- Territorial extent: United Kingdom

Dates
- Made: 20 June 1994
- Commencement: 1 July 1994
Other legislation
| Amends | Lancaster Port Commission Revision Order 1967 |
| Amended by | Lancaster Port Commission Harbour Revision Order 1994; Lancaster Port Commission Harbour Revision (Constitution) Order 2003; Communications Act 2003 and the Digital Economy Act 2017 (Consequential Amendments to Secondary Legislation) Regulations 2017 |
| Relates to | Harbours, Docks, and Piers Clauses Act 1847; Harbours Act 1964; Local Government Act 1972 |

Status: Amended

Text of statute as originally enacted

Lancaster Port Commission Harbour Revision (Constitution) Order 2003
- Statutory Instrument
- Parliament of the United Kingdom
- Citation: SI 2003/2724
- Territorial extent: United Kingdom

Dates
- Made: 22 October 2003
- Commencement: 29 October 2003
Other legislation
| Amends | Lancaster Port Commission Revision Order 1967; Harbour Authorities (Constitution) Order 1985; Lancaster Port Commission Harbour Revision Order 1994 |
| Relates to | Commissioners Clauses Act 1847; Harbours Act 1964; Lancaster Port Commission Revision Order 1985 |

Status: Current legislation

Text of statute as originally enacted

The Lancaster Port Commission Harbour Revision (Constitution) Order 2003

The whole act was repealed by section 44(1) of, and schedule 4 to, the Lancaster Port Commission Revision Order 1967 (SI 1968/532).
