= Trade Act 1822 =

Act of the Parliament of the United Kingdom

- Act of Parliament
- Parliament of the United Kingdom
- Long title: An Act to regulate the Trade between His Majesty's Possessions in America and the West Indies and other Places in America and the West Indies.
- Citation: 3 Geo. 4. c. 44
- Territorial extent: United Kingdom

Dates
- Royal assent: 24 June 1822
- Commencement: 24 June 1822 (Note: The Acts of Parliament (Commencement) Act 1793.)
- Repealed: 5 July 1825

Other legislation
- Amends: See § Background
- Repeals/revokes: See § Background
- Repealed by: Customs Law Repeal Act 1825
- Relates to: Repeal of Acts Concerning Importation Act 1822; Repeal of Acts Concerning Importation (No. 2) Act 1822; Navigation and Commerce Act 1822; Trade Act (No. 2) 1822

Status: Repealed

Text of statute as originally enacted

The Trade Act 1822 (3 Geo. 4. c. 44) was an act of the Parliament of the United Kingdom that opened a list of ports in British North America and the British West Indies to direct trade with foreign countries and colonies elsewhere in the Americas, in place of more than two dozen earlier acts restricting that trade. It was passed alongside the Trade Act (No. 2) 1822 (3 Geo. 4. c. 45), which made corresponding provision for trade with other parts of the world.

== Provisions ==
=== Repealed enactments ===
Section 1 of the act repealed 26 enactments, listed in that section.

Citation	Short title	Description	Extent of repeal
28 Geo. 3. c. 6	Trade Act 1788	An Act for regulating the Trade between the Subjects of His Majesty's Colonies and Plantations in North America, and in the West India Islands, and the Countries belonging to the United States of America, and between His Majesty's said Subjects and the Foreign Islands in the West Indies.	The whole act.
28 Geo. 3. c. 39	Importation Act 1788	An Act to allow the Importation of Rum, or other Spirits, from His Majesty's Colonies or Plantations in the West Indies, into the province of Quebec, without Payment of Duty, under certain Conditions and Restrictions.	The whole act.
29 Geo. 3. c. 16	Importation Act 1789	An Act to enable His Majesty to authorize, in case of Necessity, the Importation of Bread, Flour, Indian Corn, and Live Stock, from any of the Territories belonging to the United States of America, into the province of Quebec, and all the Countries bordering on the Gulf of Saint Lawrence, and the Islands within the said Gulf, and to the Coast of Labrador.	The whole act.
29 Geo. 3. c. 56	Trade Act 1789	An Act for explaining and amending an Act passed in the last Session of Parliament, intituled "An Act for regulating the Trade between the Subjects of His Majesty's Colonies and Plantations in North America, and in the West India Islands, and the Countries belonging to the United States of America, and between His Majesty's said Subjects and the Foreign Islands in the West Indies."	The whole act.
30 Geo. 3. c. 8	Trade Act 1790	An Act to amend Two Acts made in the Twenty-eighth Year of the Reign of His present Majesty, the one intituled "An Act for regulating the Trade between the Subjects of His Majesty's Colonies and Plantations in North America and in the West India Islands, and the Countries belonging to the United States of America, and between His Majesty's said Subjects, and the Foreign Islands in the West Indies;" and the other, intituled, "An Act to allow the Importation of Rum, or other Spirits from His Majesty's Colonies or Plantations in the West Indies, into the Province of Quebec, without Payment of Duty, under certain Conditions and Restrictions."	The whole act.
31 Geo. 3. c. 38	Importation (No. 2) Act 1791	An Act to amend an Act made in the Twenty-eighth Year of His present Majesty's Reign for regulating the Trade between the Subjects of His Majesty's Colonies and Plantations in North America and in the West India Islands, and the Countries belonging to the United States of America, and between His Majesty's said Subjects and the Foreign Islands in the West Indies; and also an Act made in the Twenty-seventh Year of His present Majesty's Reign, for allowing the Importation and Exportation of certain Goods, Wares, and Merchandize in the Ports of Kingston, Savannah-la-Mar, Montego Bay, and Santa Lucea in the Island of Jamaica, in the Port of Saint George in the Island of Grenada, in the Port of Roseau in the Island of Dominica, and in the Port of Nassau in the Island of New Providence, one of the Bahama Islands, under certain Regulations and Restrictions.	The whole act.
33 Geo. 3. c. 50	Importation and Exportation Act 1793	An Act to amend an Act passed in the Twenty-seventh Year of His present Majesty's Reign, for allowing the Importation and Exportation of certain Goods, Wares, and Merchandize, in Foreign Ships, into and from certain Ports and Places in the West Indies; and for amending so much of an Act made in the Thirty-second Year of the Reign of His present Majesty, as relates to permitting the Importation of Sugar into the Bahama and Bermuda Islands in Foreign Ships; and so much of two Acts made in the Twenty-eighth and Thirty-first Years of His present Majesty's Reign, as prohibits the Importation of Timber into any Island under the Dominion of His Majesty in the West Indies, from any Foreign Colony or Plantation in the West Indies or South America; and so much of the said Act, made in the Twenty-eighth Year of His present Majesty's Reign, as prohibits the Importation of Pitch, Tar, and Turpentine into Nova Scotia or New Brunswick, from any Country belonging to the United States of America.	The whole act.
44 Geo. 3. c. 101	Exportation (No. 3) Act 1804	An Act for permitting, until the first Day of August One thousand eight hundred and seven, the Exportation of Salt from the Port of Nassau in the Island of New Providence, the Port of Exuma, and the Port of Crooked Island, in the Bahama Islands, in Ships belonging to the Inhabitants of the United States of America, and coming in Ballast.	The whole act.
45 Geo. 3. c. 57	Importation and Exportation Act 1805	An Act to consolidate and extend the several Laws now in force, for allowing the Importation and Exportation of certain Goods and Merchandize into and from certain Ports in the West Indies.	The whole act.
46 Geo. 3. c. 72	Tortola Trade Act 1806	An Act for enabling His Majesty to permit the Importation and Exportation of certain Goods and Commodities into, and from, the Port of Road Harbour, in the Island of Tortola.	The whole act.
48 Geo. 3. c. 125	Importation (No. 5) Act 1808	An Act to permit the Importation of Rice, Grain, and Flour, from any Foreign Colonies on the Continent of America into certain Ports in the West Indies, and to allow certain Articles to be imported from the United States of America into the British Provinces in North America, for the Purpose of Exportation to the British Islands in the West Indies.	The whole act.
49 Geo. 3. c. 22	Importation, etc. (No. 2) Act 1809	An Act for allowing the Importation and Exportation of certain Goods and Commodities into and from the Port of Falmouth in the Island of Jamaica.	The whole act.
52 Geo. 3. c. 79	Importation and Exportation (No. 2) Act 1812	An Act to allow British Plantation Sugar and Coffee, imported into Bermuda in British Ships, to be exported to the Territories of the United States of America in Foreign Ships or Vessels; and to permit Articles, the Production of the said United States, to be imported into the said Island in Foreign Ships or Vessels.	The whole act.
52 Geo. 3. c. 99	Bahama Islands Trade Act 1812	An Act for allowing certain Articles to be imported into the Bahama Islands and exported therefrom in Foreign Vessels; and for encouraging the Exportation of Salt from the said Islands.	The whole act.
53 Geo. 3. c. 37	Importation (No. 2) Act 1813	An Act to amend an Act of the Twenty-eighth Year of His present Majesty, for allowing the Importation of Rum or other Spirits from His Majesty's Colonies or Plantations in the West Indies, into the province of Quebec without Payment of Duty.	The whole act.
53 Geo. 3. c. 50	Bermuda Trade Act 1813	An Act for further allowing the Importation and Exportation of certain Articles at the Island of Bermuda.	The whole act.
54 Geo. 3. c. 48	Trade of West Indies Act 1814	An Act to revive and make perpetual certain Acts for consolidating and extending the several Laws in force for allowing the Importation and Exportation of certain Articles into and from certain Ports in the West Indies.	The whole act.
57 Geo. 3. c. 28	Trade Between Bermuda and America Act 1817	An Act to extend the Powers of Two Acts, for allowing British Plantation Sugar and Coffee, and other Articles imported into Bermuda in British Ships, to be exported to America in Foreign Vessels, and to permit Articles, the Produce of America, to be imported into the said Island in Foreign Ships, to certain other Articles.	The whole act.
57 Geo. 3. c. 74	Jamaica, etc., Trade Act 1817	An Act to extend several Acts for allowing the Importation and Exportation of certain Goods and Merchandize to Porta Maria in the Island of Jamaica, and to the Port of Bridge Town in the Island of Barbadoes.	The whole act.
58 Geo. 3. c. 19	Importation and Exportation Act 1818	An Act to allow for Three Years, and until Six Weeks after the Commencement of the then next Session of Parliament, the Importation into Ports specially appointed by His Majesty, within the provinces of Nova Scotia and New Brunswick, of the Articles therein enumerated, and the Re-exportation thereof from such Ports.	The whole act.
58 Geo. 3. c. 27	Importation Act 1818	An Act to permit the Importation of certain Articles into His Majesty's Colonies or Plantations in the West Indies, or on the Continent of South America; and also certain Articles into certain Ports in the West Indies.	The whole act.
59 Geo. 3. c. 18	Exportation from the Bahamas Act 1819	An Act to make perpetual an Act of the Forty-fourth Year of His present Majesty, for permitting the Exportation of Salt from the Port of Nassau in the Island of New Providence, the Port of Exuma and the Port of Crooked Island, in the Bahama Islands, in American Ships coming in Ballast.	The whole act.
59 Geo. 3. c. 55	Exportation and Importation (Bermuda) Act 1819	An Act to extend the Provisions of Three Acts of the Fifty-second, Fifty-third, and Fifty-seventh Years of His present Majesty, for allowing British Plantation Sugar and Coffee, and other Articles imported into Bermuda in British Ships to be exported to America in Foreign Vessels, and to permit Articles, the Produce of America, to be imported into Bermuda in Foreign Ships, to certain other Articles.	The whole act.
1 Geo. 4. c. 12	Importation etc. (Jamaica) Act 1820	An Act to extend several Acts for allowing the Importation and Exportation of certain Goods and Merchandise to Morant Bay, in the Island of Jamaica.	The whole act.
1 Geo. 4. c. 32	Importation (Barbadoes) Act 1820	An Act to permit the Importation of Coffee from any Foreign Colony or Plantation in America into the Port of Bridgetown in Barbadoes.	The whole act.
1 & 2 Geo. 4. c. 7	Importation (Nova Scotia) Act 1821	An Act to make perpetual an Act of the Fifty-eighth Year of His late Majesty, to allow the Importation into certain Ports in Nova Scotia and New Brunswick, of certain enumerated Articles and the Re-exportation thereof from such Ports.	The whole act.

== Subsequent developments ==
The whole act was repealed by the Customs Law Repeal Act 1825 (6 Geo. 4. c. 105), which came into force on 5 July 1825.
