= Trade of West Indies Act 1814 =

Act of the Parliament of the United Kingdom

- Act of Parliament
- Parliament of the United Kingdom
- Long title: An Act to revive and make perpetual certain Acts for consolidating and extending the several Laws in force for allowing the Importation and Exportation of certain Articles into and from certain Ports in the West Indies.
- Citation: 54 Geo. 3. c. 48
- Territorial extent: United Kingdom

Dates
- Royal assent: 19 April 1814
- Commencement: 19 April 1814 (Note: The Acts of Parliament (Commencement) Act 1793.)
- Repealed: 24 June 1822

Other legislation
- Amends: Importation and Exportation Act 1805
- Repealed by: Trade Act 1822

Status: Repealed

Text of statute as originally enacted

The Trade of West Indies Act 1814 (54 Geo. 3. c. 48) was an act of the Parliament of the United Kingdom that revived and made perpetual an earlier act consolidating the laws governing the importation and exportation of goods at certain ports in the West Indies.

== Provisions ==
The act revived and made perpetual the Importation and Exportation Act 1805 (45 Geo. 3. c. 57) from the 25 March 1814.

== Subsequent developments ==
The whole act was repealed by section 1 of the Trade Act 1822 (3 Geo. 4. c. 44), which came into force on 24 June 1822.
