= Importation and Exportation Act 1805 =

Act of the Parliament of the United Kingdom

- Act of Parliament
- Parliament of the United Kingdom
- Long title: An Act to consolidate and extend the several Laws now in force, for allowing the Importation and Exportation of certain Goods and Merchandize into and from certain Ports in the West Indies.
- Citation: 45 Geo. 3. c. 57
- Territorial extent: United Kingdom

Dates
- Royal assent: 27 June 1805
- Commencement: 27 June 1805 (Note: The Acts of Parliament (Commencement) Act 1793.)
- Repealed: 24 June 1822

Other legislation
- Amends: Importation and Exportation Act 1787
- Amended by: Importation and Exportation (No. 3) Act 1810; Importation, etc. Act 1812; Trade of West Indies Act 1814
- Repealed by: Trade Act 1822

Status: Repealed

Text of statute as originally enacted

The Importation and Exportation Act 1805 (45 Geo. 3. c. 57) was an act of the Parliament of the United Kingdom that consolidated and extended the laws allowing the importation and exportation of certain goods and merchandise into and from certain ports in the West Indies.

== Provisions ==
Section 16 repealed such clauses and provisions of former acts of Parliament as related to the opening and establishing of the ports enumerated in the act for the more free importation and exportation of the goods enumerated in the act. The act did not, in terms, name the acts affected by this repeal, several of which — including the Importation and Exportation Act 1787 (27 Geo. 3. c. 27) — continued to appear on the statute book and were not formally repealed until the Statute Law Revision Act 1861 (24 & 25 Vict. c. 101).

== Subsequent developments ==
The act was continued until 25 March 1812 and amended by section 1 of the Importation and Exportation (No. 3) Act 1810 (50 Geo. 3. c. 21), which came into force on 6 April 1810.

The act was continued until 25 March 1814 by section 3 of the Importation, etc. Act 1812 (52 Geo. 3. c. 20), which came into force on 20 March 1812.

The act was made perpetual by section 1 of the Trade of West Indies Act 1814 (54 Geo. 3. c. 48), which came into force on 25 March 1814.

The whole act was repealed by section 1 of the Trade Act 1822 (3 Geo. 4. c. 44), which came into force on 24 June 1822.
