= Lord Camden (1783 EIC ship) =

History

Great Britain
- Name: Lord Camden
- Namesake: Charles Pratt, 1st Earl Camden
- Owner: Nathaniel Dance
- Builder: Barnard, Deptford
- Launched: December 1783
- Fate: Sold 1799

General characteristics
- Tons burthen: 775, or 77541/94 (bm)
- Length: 145 ft 6 in (44.3 m) (overall); 118 ft 7 in (36.1 m) (keel)
- Beam: 35 ft 0 3/4 in (10.7 m)
- Depth of hold: 14 ft 11 in (4.5 m)
- Propulsion: Sail
- Complement: 105
- Armament: 26 × 9&4-pounder guns
- Notes: Three decks

Lord Camden was launched in 1783 as an East Indiaman for the British East India Company. She made five voyages for the EIC before her owner sold her.

== Career ==
EIC voyage #1 (1784-1786): Captain Thomas Walker sailed from the Downs on 17 March 1784, bound for Bombay. Lord Camden reached Johanna on 27 June and arrived at Bombay on 25 September. She sailed to Bengal, reaching Madras on 28 September and arriving at Kedgeree on 10 November. She returned to the Indian Ocean and sailed to the Red Sea, reaching Mokha on 14 April 1795. She returned to Bombay on 25 September. After she returned to Bombay she was expected to sail for Europe in December. Homeward bound, she reached St Helena on 19 February 1786 and Ascension Island on 16 March. She arrived back at the Downs on 21 May.

EIC voyage #2 (1787–1789): Captain Nathaniel Dance, Jr. (Note: In 1804, Dance was captain of Earl Camden and the commodore of the EIC fleet sailing to Canton. He led the fleet at the Battle of Pulo Aura when they bluffed a French naval squadron into leaving them alone.) sailed from the Downs on 6 January 1787, bound for Bengal. Lord Camden reached Madeira on 31 January and the Cape of Good Hope on 30 April. She arrived at Diamond Harbour on 24 July. She was at Saugor on 1 February 1788, Madras on 16 March, Cochin on 13 May, and Bombay on 6 June. She then sailed to China, reaching Penang on 16 August and arriving at Whampoa anchorage on 9 October. Homeward bound, she crossed the Second Bar on 15 January 1789, reached St Helena on 2 May, and arrived at the Downs on 9 July.

EIC voyage #3 (1791–1792): Captain Dance, Jr. sailed from the Downs on 4 April 1791, bound for Madras and Bengal. Lord Camden was at São Tiago on 1 May and Simon's Bay on 29 June. She arrived at Madras on 15 August and at Diamond Harbour 25 August. She returned to Madras on 8 October and Diamond Harbour on 17 November. Homeward bound, she was at Cox's Island on 30 January 1792. She again was at Madras on 20 March, reached St Helena on 1 June, and arrived at the Downs on 25 July.

EIC voyage #4 (1794–1795): By the time Lord Camden sailed again, war with France had been going on for over a year. Captain Dance, Jr., had acquired a letter of marque on 20 November 1793.

The British government held Lord Camden at Portsmouth, together with a number of other Indiamen in anticipation of using them as transports for an attack on Île de France (Mauritius). It gave up the plan and released the vessels in May 1794. It paid £2,687 10s for having delayed her departure by 129 days.

Captain Dance, Jr. sailed from Portsmouth on 2 May, bound for Madras. Lord Camden arrived at Madras on 11 September. Homeward bound, she reached St Helena on 7 June 1795, and arrived at the Downs on 23 July.

EIC voyage #5 (1796–1799): Captain Dance, Jr., sailed from Portsmouth on 12 March 1796, bound for Madras and Bengal. Lord Camden reached Simon's Bay on 21 July, Madras on 17 November, and Trincomalee on 20 December. She returned to Madras on 5 January 1797 and arrived at Kedgeree on 1 February and Diamond Harbour on 3 April.

The British government chartered Lord Camden, together with numerous other Indiamen and country ships, to serve as a transport in a planned attack on Manila. Lord Camden was at Saugor on 11 August and Penang on 3 September. In 1797 she sustained damage and had to put back to Diamond Harbour.

When the British Government cancelled the invasion following a peace treaty with Spain, it released the vessels it had engaged. Lord Camden was at Calcutta again on 4 November. She was at Saugor on 25 February 1798, Diamond Harbour on 30 May, and back at Saugor on 10 August. Homeward bound, she was at Madras on 18 September and the Cape on 3 January 1799. She reached St Helena on 8 February, and arrived at the Downs on 13 July.

The EIC charged the British government some £4,292 for demurrage for the 206 days delay to Lord Camden's original voyage.

== Fate ==
In 1799 Lord Camden was sold into the North American timber trade.
