= List of statutory instruments of the United Kingdom, 1968 =

This is an incomplete list of statutory instruments of the United Kingdom in 1968.

== Statutory instruments ==
=== 1-499 ===
==== 1-99 ====
- Birmingham and Coventry (Variation of Limits) Water Order 1968 (SI 1968/1)
- Colchester and District Water Board (Water Charges) Order 1968 (SI 1968/32)
- Preston Manor Mine (Lighting) Special Regulations 1968 (SI 1968/38)
- Chudleigh Knighton Tunnel Mine (Lighting) Special Regulations 1968 (SI 1968/39)
- West Golds Mine (Lighting) Special Regulations 1968 (SI 1968/40)
- Removal and Disposal of Vehicle Regulations 1968 (SI 1968/43)
- Eastbourne Water (River Cuckmere) Order 1968 (SI 1968/55)
- South Essex Waterworks (Roman River) Order 1968 (SI 1968/64)
- Norwich (Aylsham Pumping Station) Water Order 1968 (SI 1968/69)
- Mid Cheshire Water Board (Extension of Operation of Byelaws) Order 1968 (SI 1968/91)

==== 100-200 ====
- Broadway New Pit Tunnel Mine (Lighting) Special Regulations 1968 (SI 1968/103)
- Mainbow Mine (Lighting) Special Regulations 1968 (SI 1968/104)
- Woking Water (Extension of Operation of Byelaws) Order 1968 (SI 1968/124)
- Tees Valley and Cleveland Water Order 1968 (SI 1968/125)
- North Devon Water (Newhaven Pumping Station) Order 1968 (SI 1968/144)
- Rugby Joint Water Board (Charges) Order 1968 (SI 1968/166)
- Manchester Water Order 1968 (SI 1968/175)
- Bermuda Constitution Order 1968 (SI 1968/182)

==== 200-299 ====
- Portsmouth (Water Charges) Order 1968 (SI 1968/204)
- Wakefield and District Water Board (Charges) Order 1968 (SI 1968/205)
- Police Cadets (Scotland) Regulations 1968 (SI 1968/208)
- Macclesfield District Water Order 1968 (SI 1968/220)
- Humber Harbour Reorganisation Scheme 1966 Confirmation Order 1967 (SI 1968/237)
- Eryi Water Board (Bwrdd Dwr Eryri) (Marchlyn Mawr) Оrder 1968 (SI 1968/244)
- Brighton Water (Extension of Operation of Byelaws) Order 1968 (SI 1968/245)
- Sheffield Water (Extension of Operation of Byelaws) Order 1968 (SI 1968/246)
- Lower Clyde Water Board (Financial Provisions) Оrder 1968 (SI 1968/268)
- Lanarkshire Water Board (Financial Provisions) Оrder 1968 (SI 1968/276)
- Middle Thames Water Board (Charges) Order 1968 (SI 1968/287)

==== 300-399 ====
- Central Scotland Water Development Board (Appointed Days) Оrder 1968 (SI 1968/313)
- York (Water Charges) Оrder 1968 (SI 1968/331)
- Bournemouth and District Water Order 1968 (SI 1968/334)
- Pontypool and District Water Оrder 1968 (SI 1968/340)
- South Essex Water (Extension of Operation of Byelaws) Order 1968 (SI 1968/347)
- Ayrshire and Bute Water Board (Financial Provisions) Оrder 1968 (SI 1968/367)
- Zetland County Council (Sand Water, Mossbank) Оrder 1968 (SI 1968/368)
- West Denbighshire and West Flintshire Water Board Оrder 1968 (SI 1968/372)
- East of Scotland Water Board (Financial Provisions) Оrder 1968 (SI 1968/383)
- East Anglian Water (Broome Common) Order 1968 (SI 1968/393)
- Fylde Water Board Order 1968 (SI 1968/394)
- North West Worcestershire Water Board (Chaddesley Corbett) Order 1968 (SI 1968/395)

==== 400-499 ====
- Dangerous Drugs (Supply to Addicts) Regulations 1968 (SI 1968/416)
- West Suffolk Water Board Order 1968 (SI 1968/417)
- Cardiganshire Water Board Оrder 1968 (SI 1968/441)
- South Staffordshire Water (Seisdon and Uttoxeter) Order 1968 (SI 1968/447)
- Rickmansworth and Uxbridge Valley Water (Extension of Operation of Byelaws) Order 1968 (SI 1968/492)
- Rochdale Water (Extension of Operation of Byelaws) Order 1968 (SI 1968/493)

=== 500-999 ===
==== 500-599 ====
- West Pennine Water Order 1968 (SI 1968/512)
- Lancaster Port Commission Revision Order 1967 (SI 1968/532)
- Chester Water (Borrowing Powers) Order 1968 (SI 1968/507)
- Durham County (Water Charges) Order 1968 (SI 1968/508)
- Malvern (Water Charges) Order 1968 (SI 1968/509)
- West Shropshire Water Board Order 1968 (SI 1968/515)
- Cromer Urban District Water Order 1968 (SI 1968/558)
- Colne Valley Water (Extension of Operation of Byelaws) Order 1968 (SI 1968/559)
- Warrington Water Order 1968 (SI 1968/584)

==== 600-699 ====
- Fife and Kinross Water Board (Financial Provisions) Оrder 1968 (SI 1968/612)
- Lee Valley Water Order 1968 (SI 1968/625)
- Sunderland and South Shields Water (Financial Provisions) Order 1968 (SI 1968/655)
- Argyll County Council Water (Loch Fada, Ardfern) Оrder 1968 (SI 1968/666)
- Argyll County Council Water (Allt Mor, Trislaig) Оrder 1968 (SI 1968/667)
- Newcastle and Gateshead Water (Team Valley Industrial Estate) Order 1968 (SI 1968/674)
- South East of Scotland Water Board (Financial Provisions) Оrder 1968 (SI 1968/681)

==== 700-799 ====
- Mid Scotland Water Board (Financial Provisions) Оrder 1968 (SI 1968/715)
- Thorney Water (Extension of Operation of Byelaws) Order 1968 (SI 1968/733)
- Southampton Corporation (Andover Boreholes) Order 1968 (SI 1968/734)
- Argyll Water Board (Financial Provisions) Оrder 1968 (SI 1968/739)
- Ross and Cromarty Water Board (Financial Provisions) Оrder 1968 (SI 1968/740)
- Inverness-shire Water Board (Financial Provisions) Оrder 1968 (SI 1968/749)
- North of Scotland Water Board (Financial Provisions) Оrder 1968 (SI 1968/750)
- Glasgow Corporation Water Оrder 1968 (SI 1968/771)
- Argyll County Council Water (Abhuinn Cheannain, Lochdonhead) Оrder 1968 (SI 1968/772)
- North East of Scotland Water Board (Financial Provisions) Оrder 1968 (SI 1968/782)
- Central Scotland Water Development Board (Superannuation) Оrder 1968 (SI 1968/783)
- Barnsley Water (Wharncliffe Estate) Order 1968 (SI 1968/790)
- Ayr County Council Water (Water of Girvan) Оrder 1968 (SI 1968/796)
- Banff County Council Water (Tomintoul) Оrder 1968 (SI 1968/797)
- Ayr County Council Water (Loch Bradan) Оrder 1968 (SI 1968/798)
- Peterhead Town Council (Ugie) Оrder 1968 (SI 1968/799)

==== 800-899 ====
- County of Inverness Water (Loch a'Mhuilinn) Оrder 1968 (SI 1968/800)
- Southampton Corporation (West Tytherley Waterworks) Order 1968 (SI 1968/812)
- South Lincolnshire Water Board Order 1968 (SI 1968/813)
- Nangiles and the Janes Mine (Storage Battery Locomotives) Special Regulations 1968 (SI 1968/868)

==== 900-999 ====
- Craven and Fylde (Horton and Martons) Water Order 1968 (SI 1968/909)
- Tendring Hundred Water (Extension of Operation of Byelaws) Order 1968 (SI 1968/919)
- York Water Оrder 1968 (SI 1968/923)
- Spenborough Water (Extension of Operation of Byelaws) Order 1968 (SI 1968/929)
- Port of Tyne Reorganisation Scheme 1967 Confirmation Order 1968 (SI 1968/942)

=== 1000-1499 ===
==== 1000-1099 ====
- Tees Valley and Cleveland (Water Charges) Order 1968 (SI 1968/1015)
- West Glamorgan Water Board (Llyn Brianne) Оrder 1968 (SI 1968/1017)
- Craven Water Board (Hawkswick Waterworks) Order 1968 (SI 1968/1038)
- Hartlepools Water Order 1968 (SI 1968/1039)
- East Worcestershire Water (Evesham Sources) Order 1968 (SI 1968/1044)
- Merchant Shipping (Load Lines) Rules 1968 (SI 1968/1053) (Note: Referenced incorrectly in one other statutory instrument as SI 1968/1058.)
- Leicester Water (Extension of Operation of Byelaws) Order 1968 (SI 1968/1067)
- Merchant Shipping (Load Lines) (Length of Ship) Regulations 1968 (SI 1968/1072)
- Merchant Shipping (Load Lines) (Deck Cargo) Regulations 1968 (SI 1968/1089)

==== 1100-1199 ====
- Merchant Shipping (Load Lines) (Exemption) Order 1968 (SI 1968/1116)
- Argyll Water Board (Allt Blaich Mhoir) Оrder 1968 (SI 1968/1121)
- Warrington Water (No. 2) Order 1968 (SI 1968/1138)
- Royal Tunbridge Wells Water (Extension of Operation of Byelaws) Order 1968 (SI 1968/1139)
- Dorset Water Order 1968 (SI 1968/1154)

==== 1200-1299 ====
- Birmingham Municipal Bank (Amendment) Order 1968 (SI 1968/1221)
- Legal Aid in Criminal Proceedings (General) Regulations 1968 (SI 1968/1231)
- Criminal Appeal Rules 1968 (SI 1968/1262)
- Bath Corporation (Water Charges) Order 1968 (SI 1968/1270)

==== 1300-1399 ====
- North West Gloucestershire and Herefordshire Water Boards (Alteration of Limits of Supply) Order 1968 (SI 1968/1317)
- Swindon Water Order 1968 (SI 1968/1318)
- East Worcestershire and Cotswold (Variation of Limits) Water Order 1968 (SI 1968/1359)
- Sheffield Water (Extension of Operation of Byelaws) (No. 2) Order 1968 (SI 1968/1360)
- Southampton Corporation (Kingsclere Borehole) Order 1968 (SI 1968/1361)
- Superannuation (Judicial Offices) Rules 1968 (SI 1968/1363)
- Public Health (Infectious Diseases) Regulations 1968 (SI 1968/1366)
- Patents Rules 1968 (SI 1968/1389)
- Trunk Roads (40 m.p.h. Speed Limit) (No. 29) Order 1968 (SI 1968/1393)
- Trunk Roads (40 m.p.h. Speed Limit) (No. 30) Order 1968 (SI 1968/1394)

==== 1400-1499 ====
- South West Worcestershire Water Board Order 1968 (SI 1968/1405)
- Eastbourne Water (Capital Powers) Order 1968 (SI 1968/1431)
- East Worcestershire Water (Capital Powers) Order 1968 (SI 1968/1438)
- East Worcestershire and North West Gloucestershire (Variation of Limits) Water Order 1968 (SI 1968/1439)
- Lee Valley Water (No. 2) Order 1968 (SI 1968/1440)
- Warrington Water (No. 3) Order 1968 (SI 1968/1441)
- South Essex Water (Extension of Operation of Byelaws) (No. 2) Order 1968 (SI 1968/1478)
- North Devon Water Board (Drought) Оrder 1968 (SI 1968/1479)
- West Suffolk Water Board (Shepherds Grove Airfield) Order 1968 (SI 1968/1489)

=== 1500-1999 ===
==== 1500-1599 ====
- Bournemouth and District Water (No. 2) Order 1968 (SI 1968/1504)
- Northallerton and the Dales Water (Byelaws) Order 1968 (SI 1968/1528)
- Liverpool (Water Charges) Order 1968 (SI 1968/1529)
- East Devon Water Order 1968 (SI 1968/1543)
- North Lindsey Water (Barrow Haven) Order 1968 (SI 1968/1554)
- Scarborough Water (Charges) Order 1968 (SI 1968/1555)
- Brighton Water (Extension of Operation of Byelaws) (No. 2) Order 1968 (SI 1968/1569)
- Cotswold Water Board (Charges) Order 1968 (SI 1968/1570)
- Mid-Scotland Water Board (Longhill Weir) Оrder 1968 (SI 1968/1586)

==== 1600-1699 ====
- Lincoln and District Water Board (General Powers) Order 1968 (SI 1968/1616)
- Minister for the Civil Service Order 1968 (SI 1968/1656)
- Newport and South Monmouthshire (Variation of Limits) Water Order 1968 (SI 1968/1659)
- Barnsley Water Order 1968 (SI 1968/1660)
- Thanet Water Order 1968 (SI 1968/1663)
- East Devon Water (No. 2) Order 1968 (SI 1968/1664)
- Nene and Ouse Water Board Order 1968 (SI 1968/1670)
- Weymouth Waterworks (Extension of Operation of Byelaws) Order 1968 (SI 1968/1686)
- Secretary of State for Social Services Order 1968 (SI 1968/1699)

==== 1700-1799 ====
- Hanningfield Water Order 1968 (SI 1968/1735)
- Mid Kent Water (Rolvenden) Order 1968 (SI 1968/1743)
- Colne Valley Water (Extension of Operation of Byelaws) (No. 2) Order 1968 (SI 1968/1750)
- Sunderland and South Shields Water (Mill Hill Pumping Station) Order 1968 (SI 1968/1751)
- East Anglian Water (Financial Provisions) Order 1968 (SI 1968/1752)
- West Riding (Cleckheaton-Oakenshaw) Motorways Scheme 1968 (SI 1968/1770)
- Mid-Wessex Water Order 1968 (SI 1968/1785)
- Wakefield and District Water Board (Victoria Reservoir) Order 1968 (SI 1968/1789)
- North West Worcestershire Water Board (Waresley Boreholes) Order 1968 (SI 1968/1790)

==== 1800-1899 ====
- West Denbighshire and West Flintshire Water Board (No. 2) Оrder 1968 (SI 1968/1810)
- Bradford Water (Brown Bank, Holden Beck and Aire Syphons) Order 1968 (SI 1968/1814)
- North Wilts Water Board (Holt Borehole) Order 1968 (SI 1968/1817)
- Wakefield and District Water Board Order 1968 (SI 1968/1820)
- Worthing Water Оrder 1968 (SI 1968/1821)
- Mid Kent Water (New Sources) Order 1968 (SI 1968/1828)
- North Devon (Meldon Reservoir) Water Order 1968 (SI 1968/1840)
- West Wilts Water Board Order 1968 (SI 1968/1844)
- Warrington Water (No. 4) Order 1968 (SI 1968/1853)
- Parliamentary Commissioner (Department and Authorities) Order 1968 (SI 1968/1859)
- Double Taxation Relief (Taxes on Income) (France) Order 1968 (SI 1968/1869)

==== 1900-1999 ====
- Mid-Scotland Water Board (Constitution etc.) Amendment Оrder 1968 (SI 1968/1932)
- Act of Adjournal (Criminal Legal Aid Fees Amendment) 1968 (SI 1968/1933)
- North Devon Water (River Exe) Order 1968 (SI 1968/1936)
- Wrexham and East Denbighshire Water Оrder 1968 (SI 1968/1946)
- Offices, Shops and Railway Premises Act 1963 (Exemption No. 7) Order 1968 (SI 1968/1947)
- Tendring Hundred Water Order 1968 (SI 1968/1962)
- Mid Kent Water (Canterbury) Order 1968 (SI 1968/1969)
- Tendring Hundred Water (Extension of Operation of Byelaws) (No. 2) Order 1968 (SI 1968/1990)
- Bucks Water Order 1968 (SI 1968/1998)

=== 2000-2499 ===
==== 2000-2099 ====
- Anthrax (Cautionary Notice) Order 1968 (SI 1968/2005)
- West Shropshire Water Board (Oakley Farm Borehole) Order 1968 (SI 1968/2023)
- Bradford Water Order 1968 (SI 1968/2051)
- Superannuation (Public and Judicial Offices) (Amendment) Rules 1968 (SI 1968/2071)

== See also ==
- List of statutory instruments of the United Kingdom
