= 47 Geo. 3 =

47 Geo. 3 can refer to either:

- 47 Geo. 3 Sess. 1, a citation used for acts of the 3rd Parliament of the United Kingdom
- 47 Geo. 3 Sess. 2, a citation used for acts of the first session of the 4th Parliament of the United Kingdom
