= List of acts of the Parliament of the United Kingdom from 1819 =

This is a complete list of acts of the Parliament of the United Kingdom for the year 1819.

Note that the first parliament of the United Kingdom was held in 1801; parliaments between 1707 and 1800 were either parliaments of Great Britain or of Ireland). For acts passed up until 1707, see the list of acts of the Parliament of England and the list of acts of the Parliament of Scotland. For acts passed from 1707 to 1800, see the list of acts of the Parliament of Great Britain. See also the list of acts of the Parliament of Ireland.

For acts of the devolved parliaments and assemblies in the United Kingdom, see the list of acts of the Scottish Parliament, the list of acts of the Northern Ireland Assembly, and the list of acts and measures of Senedd Cymru; see also the list of acts of the Parliament of Northern Ireland.

The number shown after each act's title is its chapter number. Acts passed before 1963 are cited using this number, preceded by the year(s) of the reign during which the relevant parliamentary session was held; thus the Union with Ireland Act 1800 is cited as "39 & 40 Geo. 3 c. 67", meaning the 67th act passed during the session that started in the 39th year of the reign of George III and which finished in the 40th year of that reign. Note that the modern convention is to use Arabic numerals in citations (thus "41 Geo. 3" rather than "41 Geo. III"). Acts of the last session of the Parliament of Great Britain and the first session of the Parliament of the United Kingdom are both cited as "41 Geo. 3". Acts passed from 1963 onwards are simply cited by calendar year and chapter number.

All modern acts have a short title, e.g. "the Local Government Act 2003". Some earlier acts also have a short title given to them by later acts, such as by the Short Titles Act 1896.

== 59 Geo. 3 ==
The first session of the 6th Parliament of the United Kingdom, which met from 14 January 1819 until 13 July 1819.#

This session was also traditionally cited as 59 G. 3.

=== Public general acts ===
Short title	Citation	Royal assent
Long title
Care of the King During his Illness Act 1819 (repealed)	59 Geo. 3. c. 1	12 February 1819
An act to provide for the Care of His Majesty's Royal Person during the Continuance of His Majesty's Illness. (Repealed by Statute Law Revision Act 1873 (36 & 37 Vict. c. 91))
Westminster Parliamentary Elections Act 1819 (repealed)	59 Geo. 3. c. 2	12 February 1819
An Act for reviving and further continuing, until the First Day of May One thousand eight hundred and nineteen, an Act made in the Fifty first Year of His present Majesty, (Note: Westminster Parliamentary Elections Act 1811 (51 Geo. 3. c. 126)) intituled "An Act to extend an Act made in the Eighteenth Year of His late Majesty King George the Second, (Note: Parliamentary Elections Act 1744 (18 Geo. 2. c. 18)) to explain and amend the Laws touching the Elections of the Knights of the Shire to serve in Parliament for England, respecting the Expences of Hustings and Poll Clerks, so far as regards the City of Westminster." (Repealed by Statute Law Revision Act 1873 (36 & 37 Vict. c. 91))
Duties on Pensions Act 1819 (repealed)	59 Geo. 3. c. 3	18 February 1819
An Act for continuing to His Majesty certain Duties on Malt, Sugar, Tobacco and Snuff, in Great Britain; and on Pensions, Offices and Personal Estates in England for the Service of the Year One thousand eight hundred and nineteen. (Repealed by Statute Law Revision Act 1873 (36 & 37 Vict. c. 91))
Exchequer Bills Act 1819 (repealed)	59 Geo. 3. c. 4	23 March 1819
An Act for raising the Sum of Twenty Millions, by Exchequer Bills, for the Service of the Year One thousand eight hundred and nineteen. (Repealed by Statute Law Revision Act 1873 (36 & 37 Vict. c. 91))
Tonnage of Steam Vessels Act 1819 or the Steamboat Act 1819 (repealed)	59 Geo. 3. c. 5	23 March 1819
An Act to ascertain the Tonnage of Vessels propelled by Steam. (Repealed by Registering of Vessels Act 1823 (4 Geo. 4. c. 41))
Apprehension of Smugglers Act 1819 (repealed)	59 Geo. 3. c. 6	23 March 1819
An Act to enable His Majesty to direct the Distribution of any Reward awarded by the Commissioners of the Customs or Excise to the Officers of the Army, Navy or Marines, for apprehending Smugglers, in such manner as His Majesty shall be pleased to appoint. (Repealed by Customs Law Repeal Act 1825 (6 Geo. 4. c. 105))
Cutlery Trade Act 1819 (repealed)	59 Geo. 3. c. 7	23 March 1819
An Act to regulate the Cutlery Trade in England. (Repealed by Statute Law (Repeals) Act 1976 (c. 16))
Aliens Act 1819 (repealed)	59 Geo. 3. c. 8	23 March 1819
An Act to continue, until the Twenty fifth Day of March One thousand eight hundred and twenty, an Act of the last Session of Parliament, (Note: Aliens (No. 2) Act 1818 (58 Geo. 3. c. 97)) for preventing Aliens from becoming naturalized, or being made or becoming Denizens, except in certain Cases. (Repealed by Statute Law Revision Act 1873 (36 & 37 Vict. c. 91))
Mutiny Act 1819 (repealed)	59 Geo. 3. c. 9	23 March 1819
An Act for punishing Mutiny and Desertion; and for the better Payment of the Army, and their Quarters. (Repealed by Statute Law Revision Act 1873 (36 & 37 Vict. c. 91))
Marine Mutiny Act 1819 (repealed)	59 Geo. 3. c. 10	23 March 1819
An Act for the regulating of His Majesty's Royal Marine Forces while on Shore. (Repealed by Statute Law Revision Act 1873 (36 & 37 Vict. c. 91))
Indemnity Act 1819 (repealed)	59 Geo. 3. c. 11	23 March 1819
An Act to indemnify such Persons in the United Kingdom as have omitted to qualify themselves for Offices and Employments, and for extending the time limited for certain of those Purposes respectively, until the Twenty fifth Day of March One thousand eight hundred and twenty; and to permit such Persons in Great Britain as have omitted to make and file Affidavits of the Execution of Indentures of Clerks to Attornies and Solicitors, to make and file the same on or before the First Day of Hilary Term One thousand eight hundred and twenty, and to allow Persons to make and file such Affidavits, although the Persons whom they served shall have neglected to take out their Annual Certificates. (Repealed by Promissory Oaths Act 1871 (34 & 35 Vict. c. 48))
Poor Relief Act 1819 (repealed)	59 Geo. 3. c. 12	31 March 1819
An Act to amend the Laws For the Relief of the Poor. (Repealed by Statute Law Revision Act 1958 (6 & 7 Eliz. 2. c. 46))
Assessed Taxes Act 1819 (repealed)	59 Geo. 3. c. 13	31 March 1819
An Act to continue Two Acts of the Fifty sixth (Note: Assessed Taxes Act 1816 (56 Geo. 3. c. 66)) and Fifty eighth (Note: Assessed Taxes Act 1818 (58 Geo. 3. c. 16)) Years of His present Majesty, for reducing the Duties payable on Horses used for the Purposes therein mentioned, to the Fifth Day of April One thousand eight hundred and twenty one; and to reduce the Duties chargeable under certain Acts of the Forty eighth (Note: House Tax Act 1808 (48 Geo. 3. c. 55)) and Fifty second (Note: Assessed Taxes Act 1812 (52 Geo. 3. c. 93)) Years of His present Majesty, in respect of certain Horses, Mares, Geldings and Mules. (Repealed by Revenue Act 1869 (32 & 33 Vict. c. 14))
Exportation from American Colonies Act 1819 (repealed)	59 Geo. 3. c. 14	31 March 1819
An Act to continue, until the First Day of July One thousand eight hundred and twenty three, an Act of the Forty sixth Year of His present Majesty, (Note: Exportation (No. 2) Act 1806 (46 Geo. 3. c. 17)) for permitting the Exportation of Wool from the British Plantations in America. (Repealed by Statute Law Revision Act 1873 (36 & 37 Vict. c. 91))
Customs Act 1819 (repealed)	59 Geo. 3. c. 15	31 March 1819
An Act to continue, until the First Day of July One thousand eight hundred and twenty one, an Act of the Fifty fourth (Note: Customs (No. 7) Act 1814 (54 Geo. 3. c. 103)) Year of His present Majesty, for granting certain Duties on Merchandise imported into Ireland from any Place within the Limits of the Charter granted to the United Company of Merchants of England trading to the East Indies. (Note: The United Company of Merchants of England trading to the East Indies is better known as the East India Company.) (Repealed by Statute Law Revision Act 1873 (36 & 37 Vict. c. 91))
Slave Trade Suppression, Netherlands Act 1819 (repealed)	59 Geo. 3. c. 16	31 March 1819
An Act to carry into effect the treaty with the Netherlands relating to the slave trade. (Repealed by Slave Trade Act 1873 (36 & 37 Vict. c. 88))
Slave Trade Suppression, Portugal Act 1819 (repealed)	59 Geo. 3. c. 17	31 March 1819
An Act to amend an Act of last Session of Parliament, (Note: Slave Trade (No. 3) Act 1818 (58 Geo. 3. c. 85)) for carrying into execution a Convention made between His Majesty and the King of Portugal, for the preventing the Traffic in Slaves. (Repealed by Statute Law Revision Act 1861 (24 & 25 Vict. c. 101))
Exportation from the Bahamas Act 1819 (repealed)	59 Geo. 3. c. 18	31 March 1819
An Act to make perpetual an Act of the Forty fourth Year of His present Majesty, (Note: Exportation (No. 3) Act 1804 (44 Geo. 3. c. 101)) for permitting the Exportation of Salt from the Port of Nassau in the Island of New Providence, (Note: Nassau, Bahamas.) the Port of Exuma (Note: Exuma, Bahamas.) and the Port of Crooked Island, (Note: Crooked Island, Bahamas.) in the Bahama Islands, in American Ships coming in Ballast. (Repealed by Trade Act 1822 (3 Geo. 4. c. 44))
Produce of Consolidated Fund Act 1819 (repealed)	59 Geo. 3. c. 19	31 March 1819
An Act to render, until the Fifth Day of July One thousand eight hundred and twenty, the growing Produce of the Consolidated Fund of the United Kingdom, arising in Great Britain, available for the Public Service. (Repealed by Statute Law Revision Act 1873 (36 & 37 Vict. c. 91))
Exchequer Bills (No. 2) Act 1819 (repealed)	59 Geo. 3. c. 20	31 March 1819
An Act to enable the Commissioners of His Majesty's Treasury to issue Exchequer Bills, on the Credit of such Aids or Supplies as have been or shall be granted by Parliament for the Service of the Year One thousand eight hundred and nineteen. (Repealed by Statute Law Revision Act 1873 (36 & 37 Vict. c. 91))
Estate for Duke of Wellington Act 1819 (repealed)	59 Geo. 3. c. 21	31 March 1819
An Act to amend several Acts for purchasing an Estate for the Duke of Wellington. (Repealed by Wellington Estate Act 1972 (c. 1))
King's Household During his Illness Act 1819 (repealed)	59 Geo. 3. c. 22	6 April 1819
An Act for the further Regulation of His Majesty's Household, and the Care of His Royal Person during the Continuance of His Indisposition. (Repealed by Statute Law Revision Act 1873 (36 & 37 Vict. c. 91))
Restriction on Cash Payments Act 1819 (repealed)	59 Geo. 3. c. 23	6 April 1819
An Act to restrain, until the End of the present Session of Parliament, the Governor and Company of the Bank of England from making Payments in Cash under certain Notices given by them for that Purpose. (Repealed by Statute Law Revision Act 1873 (36 & 37 Vict. c. 91))
Restriction on Cash Payments (Ireland) Act 1819 (repealed)	59 Geo. 3. c. 24	8 April 1819
An Act to restrain, until the End of the present Session of Parliament, the Governor and Company of the Bank of Ireland from making Payments in the Gold Coin of this Realm, under certain Notices given by them. (Repealed by Statute Law Revision Act 1873 (36 & 37 Vict. c. 91))
Freight for Treasure Act 1819 (repealed)	59 Geo. 3. c. 25	8 April 1819
An Act to enable His Majesty to fix the Rate and direct the Disposal of Freight Money, for the Conveyance of Specie and Jewels on board His Majesty's Ships and Vessels. (Repealed by Naval Discipline Act 1957 (5 & 6 Eliz. 2. c. 53))
Quartering of Soldiers Act 1819 (repealed)	59 Geo. 3. c. 26	8 April 1819
An Act for fixing the Rates of Subsistence to be paid to Innkeepers and others on quartering Soldiers. (Repealed by Statute Law Revision Act 1873 (36 & 37 Vict. c. 91))
Felony Act 1819 (repealed)	59 Geo. 3. c. 27	19 May 1819
An Act to facilitate the Trial of Felonies committed on board Vessels employed on Canals, Navigable Rivers, and Inland Navigations. (Repealed for England and Wales by Criminal Law Act 1826 (7 Geo. 4 c. 64), for Scotland by Statute Law (Repeals) Act 1975 (c. 10) and for Ireland by Criminal Statutes (Ireland) Repeal Act 1828 (9 Geo. 4. c. 53))
Courts of Quarter Sessions Act 1819 (repealed)	59 Geo. 3. c. 28	19 May 1819
An Act to empower Magistrates to divide the Court of Quarter Sessions. (Repealed by Statute Law Revision Act 1861 (24 & 25 Vict. c. 101))
Duties on Mineral Alkali Act 1819 (repealed)	59 Geo. 3. c. 29	19 May 1819
An Act to repeal the Duties on Mineral Alkali, and on Articles containing Mineral Alkali and other Articles, and to impose other Duties in lieu thereof. (Repealed by Statute Law Revision Act 1861 (24 & 25 Vict. c. 101))
Shrewsbury to Holyhead Roads Act 1819 (repealed)	59 Geo. 3. c. 30	19 May 1819
An Act for vesting in Commissioners the Line of Road from Shrewsbury in the County of Salop, to Bangor Ferry in the County of Carnarvon, and for discharging the Trustees under several Acts of the Seventeenth, (Note: Wilts and Somerset Roads Act 1777 (17 Geo. 3. c. 99)) Twenty eighth, (Note: Montgomery Salop and Denbigh Roads Act 1788 (28 Geo. 3. c. 96)) Thirty sixth, (Note: Bale and Dolgelly Roads Act 1796 (36 Geo. 3. c. 147)) Forty first, (Note: Welsh Gate and Cotton Hill Roads Act 1801 (41 Geo. 3. (U.K.). c. cxxii)) Forty second, (Note: Bangor Ferry and Pentre Voelas Road Act 1802 (42 Geo. 3. c. li)) Forty seventh, (Note: Roads in Salop., Denbigh and Merioneth Act 1807 (47 Geo. 3 Sess. 2. c. xii)) and Fiftieth (Note: Roads in Carnarvon and Denbigh Act 1810 (50 Geo. 3. c. lii)) Years of His present Majesty, for the future Repair and Maintenance thereof; and for altering and repealing so much of the said Acts as affects the said Line of Road. (Repealed by Shrewsbury to Bangor Road Act 1835 (5 & 6 Will. 4. c. 21) and Annual Turnpike Acts Continuance Act 1884 (47 & 48 Vict. c. 52))
Claims of British Subjects on France Act 1819 (repealed)	59 Geo. 3. c. 31	19 May 1819
An Act to enable certain Commissioners fully to carry into effect several Conventions for liquidating Claims of British Subjects and others, against the Government of France. (Repealed by Statute Law Revision Act 1873 (36 & 37 Vict. c. 91))
Duties on Tobacco, etc. Act 1819 (repealed)	59 Geo. 3. c. 32	19 May 1819
An Act to continue until the Fifth Day of July One thousand eight hundred and twenty two, and amend so much of an Act made in the Fifty fifth Year of His present Majesty, (Note: Excise (No. 2) Act 1815 (55 Geo. 3. c. 30)) for granting, until the Fifth Day of April One thousand eight hundred and nineteen, additional Duties of Excise in Great Britain, as relates to Tobacco and Snuff and certain Excise Licences. (Repealed by Statute Law Revision Act 1873 (36 & 37 Vict. c. 91))
Customs (No. 2) Act 1819 (repealed)	59 Geo. 3. c. 33	19 May 1819
An Act to continue, until the First Day of July One thousand eight hundred and twenty one, several Acts of the Fifty fourth (Note: Customs, etc. Act 1813 (54 Geo. 3. c. 36)) and Fifty fifth (Note: Duties upon East India Goods Act 1814 (55 Geo. 3. c. 10)) Years of His present Majesty, respecting the Duties of Customs payable on Merchandise imported into Great Britain, from any Place within the Limits of the Charter granted to the United Company of Merchants of England trading to the East Indies. (Repealed by Statute Law Revision Act 1873 (36 & 37 Vict. c. 91))
Waterloo Subscription Fund Act 1819 (repealed)	59 Geo. 3. c. 34	19 May 1819
An Act to amend and render more effectual several Acts for enabling the Commissioners for the Reduction of the National Debt to grant Life Annuities, and to empower the said Commissioners to grant Annuities for Lives or Years, for promoting the beneficial Purposes of the Fund commonly called The Waterloo Subscription. (Note: The Waterloo Subscription was a fund started in the City of London on 28 June 1815 by merchants and bankers to help wooded soldiers and the families of those who had died at the Battle of Waterloo.) (Repealed by Statute Law Revision Act 1873 (36 & 37 Vict. c. 91))
Jury Trials (Scotland) Act 1819 (repealed)	59 Geo. 3. c. 35	19 May 1819
An Act to amend an Act, passed in the Fifty fifth Year of the Reign of His present Majesty, intituled "An Act to facilitate the Administration of Justice in that Part of the United Kingdom called Scotland, by extending Trial by Jury to Civil Causes." (Note: Jury Trials (Scotland) Act 1815 (55 Geo. 3. c. 42)) (Repealed by Court of Session Act 1988 (c. 36))
Bread Act 1819 (repealed)	59 Geo. 3. c. 36	14 June 1819
An Act to repeal certain Acts now in force for regulating the making and Sale of Bread out of the City of London, and the Liberties thereof, and beyond the Weekly Bills of Mortality and Ten Miles of the Royal Exchange, where no Assize is set; and for establishing other Provisions and Regulations relative thereto. (Repealed by Statute Law Revision Act 1861 (24 & 25 Vict. c. 101))
House of Commons Act 1819 (repealed)	59 Geo. 3. c. 37	14 June 1819
An Act for further regulating the Qualification of Members to serve in the United Parliament of Great Britain and Ireland. (Repealed by Property Qualification for Members of Parliament Act 1858 (21 & 22 Vict. c. 26))
North American Fisheries Act 1819 (repealed)	59 Geo. 3. c. 38	14 June 1819
An Act to enable His Majesty to make Regulations with respect to the taking and curing Fish on certain Parts of the Coasts of Newfoundland, Labrador, and His Majesty's other Possessions in North America, according to a Convention made between His Majesty and the United States of America. (Repealed by Statute Law (Repeals) Act 1976 (c. 16))
Payments into Receipt of the Exchequer Act 1819 (repealed)	59 Geo. 3. c. 39	14 June 1819
An Act for the more frequent Payment, into the Receipt of the Exchequer at Westminster, of Monies arising from the Duties of Customs, Excise, Stamps and Postage in England. (Repealed by Statute Law Revision Act 1873 (36 & 37 Vict. c. 91))
Benefices Act 1819 (repealed)	59 Geo. 3. c. 40	14 June 1819
An Act to secure Spiritual Persons in the Possession of Benefices in certain Cases. (Repealed by Statute Law Revision Act 1873 (36 & 37 Vict. c. 91))
Contagious Diseases (Ireland) Act 1819 (repealed)	59 Geo. 3. c. 41	14 June 1819
An Act to establish Regulations for preventing Contagious Diseases in Ireland. (Repealed by Sanitary Act 1866 (29 & 30 Vict. c. 90))
National Debt Act 1819 (repealed)	59 Geo. 3. c. 42	21 June 1819
An Act for raising the Sum of Twelve Millions by way of Annuities. (Repealed by Statute Law Revision Act 1870 (33 & 34 Vict. c. 69))
Contribution of Marquis Camden Act 1819 (repealed)	59 Geo. 3. c. 43	21 June 1819
An Act to authorise the Receipt and Appropriation of certain Sums voluntarily contributed by the Most Noble John Jeffreys Marquis Camden, in aid of the Public Service. (Repealed by Statute Law Revision Act 1873 (36 & 37 Vict. c. 91))
Trials of Murders, etc., in Honduras Act 1819 (repealed)	59 Geo. 3. c. 44	21 June 1819
An Act to amend an Act passed in the Fifty seventh Year of His present Majesty, (Note: Murders Abroad Act 1817 (57 Geo. 3. c. 53)) for the more effectual Punishment of Murders, Manslaughters, Rapes, Robberies and Burglaries committed in Places not within His Majesty's Dominions, as relates to the Trial of Murders, Manslaughters, Rapes, Robberies and Burglaries committed in Honduras. (Repealed by Statute Law Revision Act 1873 (36 & 37 Vict. c. 91))
Court of Session Act 1819 (repealed)	59 Geo. 3. c. 45	22 June 1819
An Act to explain and amend certain Acts relative to the Court of Session in Scotland. (Repealed by Court of Session Act 1988 (c. 36))
Appeal of Murder, etc. Act 1819 (repealed)	59 Geo. 3. c. 46	22 June 1819
An act to abolish Appeals of Murder, Treason, Felony or other Offences, and Wager of Battel, or joining Issue and Trial by Battel, in Writs of Right. (Repealed by Statute Law Revision Act 1873 (36 & 37 Vict. c. 91))
Barnstaple Elections Act 1819 (repealed)	59 Geo. 3. c. 47	22 June 1819
An Act to indemnity Persons who shall give Evidence before the Lords Spiritual and Temporal on the Bill for preventing Bribery and Corruption at the Election of Members to serve in Parliament for the Borough of Barnstaple, in the County of Devon. (Repealed by Statute Law Revision Act 1873 (36 & 37 Vict. c. 91))
Roads Between London and Holyhead Act 1819	59 Geo. 3. c. 48	2 July 1819
An Act to amend an Act passed in the Fifty fifth Year of His present Majesty, (Note: Holyhead Roads Act 1815 (55 Geo. 3. c. 152)) for granting to His Majesty the Sum of Twenty thousand Pounds towards repairing Roads between London and Holyhead by Chester, and between London and Bangor by Shrewsbury; and for giving additional Powers to the Commissioners therein named, to build a Bridge over the Menai Straits, (Note: The Menai Suspension Bridge was built as a result.) and to make a new Road from Bangor Ferry to Holyhead, in the County of Anglesea.
Resumption of Cash Payments, etc. Act 1819 or Resumption of Cash Payments Act 1819 or Peel's Bill (repealed)	59 Geo. 3. c. 49	2 July 1819
An act to continue the Restrictions contained in several Acts on Payments in Cash by the Bank of England, until the First Day of May One thousand eight hundred and twenty three, and to provide for the gradual Resumption of such Payments; and to permit the Exportation of Gold and Silver. (Repealed by Statute Law Revision Act 1873 (36 & 37 Vict. c. 91))
Settlement of the Poor (England) Act 1819 (repealed)	59 Geo. 3. c. 50	2 July 1819
An Act to amend the Laws respecting the Settlement of the Poor, so far as regards renting Tenements. (Repealed by Poor Relief (Settlement) Act 1825 (6 Geo. 4. c. 57))
Assessed Taxes (No. 2) Act 1819 (repealed)	59 Geo. 3. c. 51	2 July 1819
An Act to relieve Persons compounding for their Assessed Taxes, from an Annual Assessment, for the Term of Three Years. (Repealed by Revenue Act 1869 (32 & 33 Vict. c. 14))
Customs (No. 3) Act 1819 (repealed)	59 Geo. 3. c. 52	2 July 1819
An Act to repeal the several Duties of Customs chargeable in Great Britain and to grant other Duties in lieu thereof. (Repealed by Customs Law Repeal Act 1825 (6 Geo. 4. c. 105))
Excise Act 1819 (repealed)	59 Geo. 3. c. 53	2 July 1819
An Act for granting to His Majesty certain additional Duties of Excise on Tea, Coffee and Cocoa Nuts, Tobacco and Snuff, Pepper, Malt and British Spirits, and consolidating the same with the former Duties thereon; and for amending certain Laws of Excise relating thereto. (Repealed by Revenue Act 1869 (32 & 33 Vict. c. 14))
Treaty with United States, etc. Act 1819 (repealed)	59 Geo. 3. c. 54	2 July 1819
An Act to carry into effect a Convention of Commerce concluded between His Majesty and the United States of Americas, and a Treaty with the Prince Regent of Portugal. (Repealed by Statute Law Revision Act 1873 (36 & 37 Vict. c. 91))
Exportation and Importation (Bermuda) Act 1819 (repealed)	59 Geo. 3. c. 55	2 July 1819
An Act to extend the Provisions of Three Acts of the Fifty second, (Note: Importation and Exportation (No. 2) Act 1812 (52 Geo. 3. c. 79)) Fifty third, (Note: Bermuda Trade Act 1813 (53 Geo. 3. c. 50)) and Fifty seventh (Note: Trade Between Bermuda and America Act 1817 (57 Geo. 3. c. 28)) Years of His present Majesty, for allowing British Plantation Sugar and Coffee, and other Articles imported into Bermuda in British Ships to be exported to America in Foreign Vessels, and to permit Articles, the Produce of America, to be imported into Bermuda in Foreign Ships, to certain other Articles. (Repealed by Trade Act 1822 (3 Geo. 4. c. 44))
Navy Prize Orders Act 1819 (repealed)	59 Geo. 3. c. 56	2 July 1819
An Act to make further Regulations as to the Payment of Navy Prize Orders. (Repealed by Admiralty, &c. Acts Repeal Act 1865 (28 & 29 Vict. c. 112))
Excise (No. 2) Act 1819 (repealed)	59 Geo. 3. c. 57	2 July 1819
An Act to alter and amend certain Laws of Excise in respect to Salt and Rock Salt. (Repealed by Statute Law Revision Act 1861 (24 & 25 Vict. c. 101))
Wages of Merchant Seamen Act 1819 (repealed)	59 Geo. 3. c. 58	2 July 1819
An Act for facilitating the Recovery of the Wages of Seamen in the Merchant Service. (Repealed by Statute Law Revision Act 1873 (36 & 37 Vict. c. 91))
Wages of Certain Deceased Seamen Act 1819 (repealed)	59 Geo. 3. c. 59	2 July 1819
An Act to extend the Provisions of an Act made in the Fifty fifth Year of His present Majesty, (Note: Wills, etc., of Seamen, etc. Act 1815 (55 Geo. 3. c. 60)) for the Payment of Wages due to deceased Seamen and Marines, to Wages due to intestate Bastards. (Repealed by Admiralty, &c. Acts Repeal Act 1865 (28 & 29 Vict. c. 112))
Ordinations for Colonies Act 1819 or the Ordination for Colonies Act 1819 (repealed)	59 Geo. 3. c. 60	2 July 1819
An Act to permit the Archbishops of Canterbury and York, and the Bishop of London, for the time being, to admit Persons into Holy Orders specially for the Colonies. (Repealed by Overseas and Other Clergy (Ministry and Ordination) Measure 1967 (No. 3))
Building, etc., of Gaols (Scotland) Act 1819 (repealed)	59 Geo. 3. c. 61	2 July 1819
An Act to enable Counties and Stewarteries in Scotland to give aid to Royal Burghs situated therein, for the purpose of improving, enlarging or rebuilding their Gaols, or to improve, enlarge or rebuild Common Gaols of Counties and Stewarteries which are not the Gaols of Royal Burghs. (Repealed by Statute Law Revision Act 1873 (36 & 37 Vict. c. 91))
Savings Bank (Scotland) Act 1819 (repealed)	59 Geo. 3. c. 62	2 July 1819
An Act for the protection of banks for savings in Scotland. (Repealed by Savings Bank Act 1835 (5 & 6 Will. 4. c. 57))
Estate for Duke of Wellington (No. 2) Act 1819 (repealed)	59 Geo. 3. c. 63	2 July 1819
An Act to explain an Act passed in the Fifty fifth Year of His present Majesty, (Note: Purchase of Estate for Duke of Wellington Act 1815 (55 Geo. 3. c. 186)) for purchasing an Estate for the Duke of Wellington. (Repealed by Wellington Estate Act 1972 (1972 c. 1))
Warden of the Fleet Prison Act 1819 (repealed)	59 Geo. 3. c. 64	2 July 1819
An Act to facilitate Proceedings against the Warden of The Fleet, in Vacation. (Repealed by Statute Law Revision Act 1861 (24 & 25 Vict. c. 101))
Lotteries Act 1819 (repealed)	59 Geo. 3. c. 65	2 July 1819
An Act for granting to His Majesty a Sum of Money to be raised by Lotteries. (Repealed by Statute Law Revision Act 1873 (36 & 37 Vict. c. 91))
Cotton Mills and Factories Act 1819 or the Cotton Mills, etc. Act 1819 (repealed)	59 Geo. 3. c. 66	2 July 1819
An Act to make further Provisions for the Regulation of Cotton Mills and Factories, and for the better Preservation of the Health of young Persons employed therein. (Repealed by Labour in Cotton Mills Act 1831 (1 & 2 Will. 4. c. 39))
Accounts of Colonial Revenues Act 1819 (repealed)	59 Geo. 3. c. 67	2 July 1819
An Act to continue, until the Thirtieth Day of July One thousand eight hundred and twenty, an Act of the Fifty fourth Year of His present Majesty, (Note: Accounts of Colonial Revenues Act 1814 (54 Geo. 3. c. 184)) for the effectual Examination of Accounts of the Receipt and Expenditure of the Colonial Revenues in the Islands of Ceylon, Mauritius, Malta, Trinidad, and in the Settlements of the Cape of Good Hope. (Repealed by Statute Law Revision Act 1873 (36 & 37 Vict. c. 91))
Exoneration from a Crown Debt Act 1819 (repealed)	59 Geo. 3. c. 68	2 July 1819
An Act for exonerating the Manor of Dawlish in the County of Devon, from the Claims of the Crown against the Estate of John Inglett Fortescue Esquire. (Repealed by Statute Law Revision Act 1950 (14 Geo. 6. c. 6))
Foreign Enlistment Act 1819 (repealed)	59 Geo. 3. c. 69	3 July 1819
An Act to prevent the enlisting or Engagement of His Majesty's Subjects to serve in Foreign Service, and the fitting out or equipping, in His Majesty's Dominions, Vessels for Warlike Purposes, without His Majesty's Licence. (Repealed by Foreign Enlistment Act 1870 (33 & 34 Vict. c. 90))
Duelling (Scotland) Act 1819 (repealed)	59 Geo. 3. c. 70	3 July 1819
An Act to repeal certain Acts of the Parliament of Scotland, regarding Duelling. (Repealed by Statute Law Revision Act 1873 (36 & 37 Vict. c. 91))
National Debt (No. 2) Act 1819 (repealed)	59 Geo. 3. c. 71	6 July 1819
An Act for raising a Loan of Twelve Millions from the Commissioners for the Reduction of the National Debt. (Repealed by Statute Law Revision Act 1861 (24 & 25 Vict. c. 101))
Excise (No. 3) Act 1819 (repealed)	59 Geo. 3. c. 72	6 July 1819
An Act to grant to His Majesty an additional Duty of Excise on Tobacco in Ireland. (Repealed by Statute Law Revision Act 1873 (36 & 37 Vict. c. 91))
Importation, etc. Act 1819 (repealed)	59 Geo. 3. c. 73	6 July 1819
An Act to repeal several Acts, requiring the Masters of Vessels carrying Certificate Goods to Ireland to take Duplicates of the Contents; prohibiting the Importation of certain wrought Goods, and the Exportation of Gunpowder when the Price shall exceed a certain Sum. (Repealed by Statute Law Revision Act 1873 (36 & 37 Vict. c. 91))
Importation, etc. (No. 2) Act 1819 (repealed)	59 Geo. 3. c. 74	6 July 1819
An Act to allow the Importation of Tobacco from the East Indies and other Places; and for confining the Exportation of Tobacco from Great Britain, and the Importation thereof into Ireland, to Vessels of Seventy Tons Burthen and upward. (Repealed by Customs Law Repeal Act 1825 (6 Geo. 4. c. 105))
Trade in Spirits Act 1819 (repealed)	59 Geo. 3. c. 75	6 July 1819
An Act to continue, until the Fifth Day of July One thousand eight hundred and twenty, Two Acts, made in the Fifty fourth (Note: Spirit Trade Act 1814 (54 Geo. 3. c. 149)) and Fifty sixth (Note: Trade in Spirits Act 1816 (56 Geo. 3. c. 105)) Years of His present Majesty, for regulating the Trade in Spirits between Great Britain and Ireland reciprocally. (Repealed by Statute Law Revision Act 1873 (36 & 37 Vict. c. 91))
Bank of England Act 1819 (repealed)	59 Geo. 3. c. 76	6 July 1819
An Act to establish further Regulations respecting Advances by the Bank of England for the Public Service, and the Purchase of Government Securities by the said Bank. (Repealed by National Loans Act 1968 (c. 13))
Bounties on Pilchards Act 1819 (repealed)	59 Geo. 3. c. 77	6 July 1819
An Act to continue, until the Twenty fourth Day of June One thousand eight hundred and twenty six, an Act (Note: Bounties on Pilchards Act 1812 (52 Geo. 3. c. 42)) for amending the Laws relating to the Allowance of the Bounties on Pilchards exported. (Repealed by Sea Fisheries Act 1868 (31 & 32 Vict. c. 45))
Customs (No. 4) Act 1819 (repealed)	59 Geo. 3. c. 78	6 July 1819
An Act for transferring the Duty of the Supervisor of the Receiver General's Receipts and Payments to the Comptroller General of the Customs in England. (Repealed by Customs Law Repeal Act 1825 (6 Geo. 4. c. 105))
Bringing of Coals, etc., to London, etc. Act 1819 (repealed)	59 Geo. 3. c. 79	6 July 1819
An Act to continue, until the First Day of August One thousand eight hundred and twenty, Two Acts of the Forty fifth (Note: Bringing of Coals, etc., to London, etc. Act 1805 (45 Geo. 3. c. 128)) and Fiftieth (Note: Bringing of Coals, etc., to London, etc. Act 1810 (50 Geo. 3. c. 110)) Years of His present Majesty, allowing the bringing of Coals, Culm and Cinders to London and Westminster by Inland Navigation. (Repealed by Statute Law Revision Act 1873 (36 & 37 Vict. c. 91))
Common Recoveries, etc. Act 1819 (repealed)	59 Geo. 3. c. 80	6 July 1819
An Act concerning Common Recoveries to be suffered by Attorney in Courts of Ancient Demesne; and to explain an Act of His present Majesty, (Note: Estates of Lunatics Act 1803 (43 Geo. 3. c. 75)) relative to the Sale or mortgaging of Estates of Lunatics. (Repealed by Infants' Property Act 1830 (11 Geo. 4 & 1 Will. 4. c. 65))
Charities Inquiry (England) Act 1819 (repealed)	59 Geo. 3. c. 81	6 July 1819
An Act to amend an Act of the last Session of Parliament, (Note: Inquiry Concerning Charities (England) Act 1818 (58 Geo. 3. c. 91)) for appointing Commissioners to inquire concerning Charities in England for the Education of the Poor; and to extend the Powers thereof to other Charities in England and Wales; to continue in force until the First Day of August One thousand eight hundred and twenty three, and from thence until the End of the then next Session of Parliament. (Repealed by Statute Law Revision Act 1873 (36 & 37 Vict. c. 91))
Site for Docks, etc., Dublin Act 1819 (repealed)	59 Geo. 3. c. 82	6 July 1819
An Act to amend an Act made in the Fifty fifth Year of His present Majesty's Reign, (Note: Purchases for Docks, etc., Dublin Act 1815 (55 Geo. 3. c. 144)) for enabling the Commissioners of Customs and Port Duties in Ireland to purchase Premises for erecting Docks, Warehouses and Offices in Dublin. (Repealed by Customs Law Repeal Act 1825 (6 Geo. 4. c. 105))
Customs (No. 5) Act 1819 (repealed)	59 Geo. 3. c. 83	7 July 1819
An Act to grant Duties of Customs and to allow Drawbacks on certain Goods, Wares and Merchandise imported into and exported from Ireland, in lieu of former Duties and Drawbacks on the like Articles; and to make further Regulations for securing the Duties of Customs in Ireland. (Repealed by Customs Law Repeal Act 1825 (6 Geo. 4. c. 105))
Kinsale Act 1819 or the Kinsale, Roads and Public Works (Ireland) Act 1819 (repealed)	59 Geo. 3. c. 84	7 July 1819
An Act to amend the Laws for making, repairing, and improving the Roads and other Public Works in Ireland by Grand Jury Presentments, and for a more effectual Investigation of such Presentments, and for further securing a true, full and faithful Account of all Monies levied under the same. (Repealed by Statute Law Revision Act 1873 (36 & 37 Vict. c. 91))
Vestries Act 1819 (repealed)	59 Geo. 3. c. 85	7 July 1819
An Act to amend and correct an Act of the last Session of Parliament (Note: Vestries Act 1818 (58 Geo. 3. c. 69)) for the Regulation of Parish Vestries in England. (Repealed by Church of England (Miscellaneous Provisions) Measure 1992 (No. 1))
Dean Forest Act 1819	59 Geo. 3. c. 86	7 July 1819
An Act for regulating the Exercise of the Right of Common of Pasture in the New Forest, in the County of Southampton; for repealing certain parts of Two Acts passed in the Thirty-ninth and Fortieth (Note: New Forest Act 1800 (39 & 40 Geo. 3. c. 86)) and the Fifty-second (Note: Duchy of Lancaster Act 1812 (52 Geo. 3. c. 161)) Years of His present Majesty; and for the better Collection and Recovery of the Gale Rents in the Forest of Dean, in the County of Gloucester.
Duties on Malt, etc. (Ireland) Act 1819 (repealed)	59 Geo. 3. c. 87	12 July 1819
An Act to grant to His Majesty certain Duties of Excise in Ireland on Malt. (Repealed by Statute Law Revision Act 1873 (36 & 37 Vict. c. 91))
Duties on Malt, etc. (Great Britain) Act 1819 (repealed)	59 Geo. 3. c. 88	12 July 1819
An Act to repeal the annual Excise Duties upon Malt, Tobacco and Snuff, continued by an Act of the present Session of Parliament, (Note: Duties on Pensions Act 1819 (59 Geo. 3. c. 3)) and to grant other Duties in lieu thereof, for the Service of the Year ending the Fifth Day of July One thousand eight hundred and twenty. (Repealed by Statute Law Revision Act 1873 (36 & 37 Vict. c. 91))
Duties on Sweets, etc. Act 1819 (repealed)	59 Geo. 3. c. 89	12 July 1819
An Act to continue, until the Tenth Day of October One thousand eight hundred and twenty four, an Act made in the Fifty seventh Year of His present Majesty, (Note: Duty on Sweets, etc. Act 1817 (57 Geo. 3. c. 111)) for suspending a Part of the Duties on Sweets or Made Wines. (Repealed by Statute Law Revision Act 1873 (36 & 37 Vict. c. 91))
Duties on Soap, etc. (Great Britain) Act 1819 (repealed)	59 Geo. 3. c. 90	12 July 1819
An Act for the Prevention of Frauds in the Duties on Soap; for preserving the Books or Papers called Specimens, left by Officers of Excise on the Premises of Traders; and for requiring more speedy Payment of the Excise Duties on Printed Calicoes. (Repealed by Statute Law Revision Act 1873 (36 & 37 Vict. c. 91))
Charity Estates (England) Act 1819 (repealed)	59 Geo. 3. c. 91	12 July 1819
An Act for giving additional Facilities in Applications to Courts of Equity, regarding the Management of Estates or Funds belonging to Charities. (Repealed by Statute Law Revision Act 1861 (24 & 25 Vict. c. 101))
Conveyance of Offenders (Ireland) Act 1819 (repealed)	59 Geo. 3. c. 92	12 July 1819
An Act to enable Justices of the Peace in Ireland to act as such in certain Cases out of the Limits of the Counties in which they actually are; to make Provision for the Execution of Warrants of Distress granted by them; and to authorise them to impose Fines upon Constables and other Officers for Neglect of Duty, and on Matters for Ill Usage of their Apprentices. (Repealed by Statute Law Revision Act 1873 (36 & 37 Vict. c. 91), Statute Law Revision Act 1888 (51 & 52 Vict. c. 3), Statute Law Revision (No. 2) Act 1890 (53 & 54 Vict. c. 51) and Prison Act (Northern Ireland) 1953 (c. 18 (N.I.)))
Court of Exchequer (Ireland) Act 1819 (repealed)	59 Geo. 3. c. 93	12 July 1819
An Act to continue for One Tear, and from thence until the End of the then next Session of Parliament, an Act, made in the Fifty sixth Year of His present Majesty's Reign, (Note: Court of Exchequer (Ireland) Act 1816 (56 Geo. 3. c. 122)) to make Provision for securing the Profits of the Office of Clerk of the Pleas of His Majesty's Court of Exchequer in Ireland. (Repealed by Statute Law Revision Act 1873 (36 & 37 Vict. c. 91))
Crown Land Act 1819	59 Geo. 3. c. 94	12 July 1819
An Act to explain and amend Two Acts passed in the Thirty-ninth and Fortieth (Note: Crown Private Estate Act 1800 (39 & 40 Geo. 3. c. 88)) and Forty-seventh (Note: Crown Lands, Escheats Act 1807 (47 Geo. 3 Sess. 2. c. 24)) Years of His present Majesty, concerning the Disposition of certain Real and Personal Property of his Majesty, His Heirs and Successors.
Poor Relief (No. 2) Act 1819 (repealed)	59 Geo. 3. c. 95	12 July 1819
An Act for confirming ancient Separations of Towns Corporate from Parishes, in regard to the Maintenance of the Poor. (Repealed by Statute Law Revision Act 1950 (14 Geo. 6. c. 6))
Felonies on Stage Coaches Act 1819 (repealed)	59 Geo. 3. c. 96	12 July 1819
An Act to facilitate the Trials of Felonies committed on Stage Coaches and Stage Waggons, and other such Carriages; and of Felonies committed on the Boundaries of Counties. (Repealed by Statute Law Revision Act 1887 (50 & 51 Vict. c. 59))
Slave Trade Act 1819 (repealed)	59 Geo. 3. c. 97	12 July 1819
An Act to extend the Provisions of an Act made in the Forty sixth Year of His Majesty's Reign, intituled "An Act for the more speedy Trial of Offences committed in Distant Parts upon the Seas," (Note: Offences at Sea Act 1806 (46 Geo. 3. c. 54)) to the Trial of Offences committed in Africa against the Laws for abolishing the Slave Trade. (Repealed by Statute Law Revision Act 1861 (24 & 25 Vict. c. 101))
Distillation of Spirits (Ireland) Act 1819 (repealed)	59 Geo. 3. c. 98	12 July 1819
An Act to limit the Continuance of the Operation of the several Acts for imposing Fines upon Townlands and Places in Ireland, in respect of Offences relating to the unlawful Distillation of Spirits; and to amend the said Acts; and to provide for the more effectual Prevention or Suppression of such Offences. (Repealed by Illicit Distillation (Ireland) Act 1831 (1 & 2 Will. 4. c. 55))
Resumption of Cash Payments Act 1819 (repealed)	59 Geo. 3. c. 99	12 July 1819
An Act to continue, until the First Day of June One thousand eight hundred and twenty three, the Restrictions on Payments in Cash by the Bank of Ireland, and to direct the gradual Resumption of Cash Payments by the said Bank. (Repealed by Statute Law Revision Act 1873 (36 & 37 Vict. c. 91))
Prisons (Ireland) Act 1819 (repealed)	59 Geo. 3. c. 100	12 July 1819
An Act to amend an Act of the Fiftieth Year of the Reign of His present Majesty, (Note: Prisons (Ireland) Act 1810 (50 Geo. 3. c. 103)) relating to Prisons in Ireland. (Repealed by Prisons (Ireland) Act 1826 (7 Geo. 4. c. 74))
Transportation Act 1819 (repealed)	59 Geo. 3. c. 101	12 July 1819
An Act to enlarge the Powers of an Act passed in the Fifty sixth Year of His present Majesty, (Note: Transportation Act 1816 (56 Geo. 3. c. 27)) relative to the Transportation of Offenders, to continue until the First Day of May One thousand eight hundred and twenty one. (Repealed by Statute Law Revision Act 1873 (36 & 37 Vict. c. 91))
Gamekeepers, Wales Act 1819 (repealed)	59 Geo. 3. c. 102	12 July 1819
An Act for further regulating the Appointment of Gamekeepers in Wales. (Repealed by Game Act 1831 (1 & 2 Will. 4. c. 32))
Laying of Accounts Before Parliament Act 1819 (repealed)	59 Geo. 3. c. 103	12 July 1819
An Act to repeal so much of Two Acts (Note: Russia Company (Membership) Act 1698 (10 Will. 3. c. 6)) (Note: Encouragement of Manufactures Act 1698 (11 Will. 3. c. 10)) as require certain Accounts to be laid before Parliament; and to amend an Act of the Twenty sixth Year of His present Majesty, (Note: Fisheries Act 1786 (26 Geo. 3. c. 41)) relative to laying an Account before Parliament. (Repealed by Statute Law Revision Act 1861 (24 & 25 Vict. c. 101))
Excise (No. 4) Act 1819 (repealed)	59 Geo. 3. c. 104	12 July 1819
An Act to continue, until the Fifth Day of July One thousand eight hundred and twenty, certain Laws of Excise, with regard to Crown Glass and Flint and Phial Glass; and to alter certain Laws with regard to Flint Glass. (Repealed by Glass Duties Act 1838 (1 & 2 Vict. c. 44))
Excise (No. 5) Act 1819 (repealed)	59 Geo. 3. c. 105	12 July 1819
An Act for granting to His Majesty an additional countervailing Duty on Spirits extracted in England or Ireland respectively, and imported into Scotland; and for repealing the additional Duty on Licences taken out by Retailers of Sweets in Great Britain; and for exempting from all countervailing Duties the Leather and Glass of Carriages brought by Persons for private Use from Ireland into Great Britain, or from Great Britain into Ireland. (Repealed by Statute Law Revision Act 1861 (24 & 25 Vict. c. 101))
Excise (Ireland) Act 1819 (repealed)	59 Geo. 3. c. 106	12 July 1819
An Act to amend the several Acts for securing the Payment of the Duties of Excise upon certain Licences, and regulating the issuing of such Licences; and for securing the Duties upon Spirits distilled by licensed Distillers in Ireland. (Repealed by Statute Law Revision Act 1873 (36 & 37 Vict. c. 91))
Permits, etc. (Ireland) Act 1819 (repealed)	59 Geo. 3. c. 107	12 July 1819
An Act to consolidate and amend several Acts for regulating the granting of Permits and Certificates for the Conveyance and Protection of certain Goods in Ireland. (Repealed by Statute Law Revision Act 1874 (37 & 38 Vict. c. 35))
Post Office (Ireland) Act 1819 (repealed)	59 Geo. 3. c. 108	12 July 1819
An Act to amend several Acts relating to the Post Office and Conveyance of Letters in Ireland. (Repealed by Post Office (Repeal of Laws) Act 1837 (7 Will. 4 & 1 Vict. c. 32))
Irish Fisheries Act 1819 (repealed)	59 Geo. 3. c. 109	12 July 1819
An Act for the further Encouragement and Improvement of the Irish Fisheries. (Repealed by Fisheries (Ireland) Act 1842 (5 & 6 Vict. c. 106) and Public Works, etc., Loans (Northern Ireland) Act 1953 (c. 13 (N.I.)))
Levant Company's Dues Act 1819 (repealed)	59 Geo. 3. c. 110	12 July 1819
An Act to remove Doubts respecting the Dues payable to the Levant Company. (Repealed by Dissolution of Levant Company Act 1825 (6 Geo. 4. c. 33))
Postage Act 1819 (repealed)	59 Geo. 3. c. 111	12 July 1819
An Act to repeal so much of an Act passed in the Fifty fifth Year of His present Majesty, (Note: Postage (No. 2) Act 1815 (55 Geo. 3. c. 153)) as relates to the Postage and Conveyance of Letters to and from the Cape of Good Hope, Ceylon, the Mauritius, and the East Indies; and to make other Regulations respecting the Postage of such Letters and Packets, and other Letters and Packets lent by the Post. (Repealed by Post Office (Repeal of Laws) Act 1837 (7 Will. 4 & 1 Vict. c. 32))
Exportation Act 1819 (repealed)	59 Geo. 3. c. 112	12 July 1819
An Act to grant, until the Fifth Day of July One thousand eight hundred and twenty one, an additional Bounty on the Exportation of certain Silk Manufactures of Great Britain. (Repealed by Statute Law Revision Act 1873 (36 & 37 Vict. c. 91))
Southern Whale Fishery Act 1819 (repealed)	59 Geo. 3. c. 113	12 July 1819
An Act for continuing the Premiums allowed to Ships employed in the Southern Whale Fishery. (Repealed by Statute Law Revision Act 1861 (24 & 25 Vict. c. 101))
Duties in New South Wales Act 1819 (repealed)	59 Geo. 3. c. 114	12 July 1819
An Act to stay Proceedings against any Governor or other Persons concerned in imposing and levying Duties in New South Wales; to continue, until the first Day of January One thousand eight hundred and twenty one, certain Duties; and to empower the said Governor to levy a Duty on Spirits made in the said Colony. (Repealed by Statute Law Revision Act 1873 (36 & 37 Vict. c. 91))
Duties on Glass (Great Britain) Act 1819 (repealed)	59 Geo. 3. c. 115	12 July 1819
An Act to repeal the Duties and Drawbacks of Excise on Plates or Sheets of Plate Glass, and to impose other Duties and allow other Drawbacks in lieu thereof. (Repealed by Glass Duties Act 1838 (1 & 2 Vict. c. 44))
Militia Pay (Great Britain) Act 1819 (repealed)	59 Geo. 3. c. 116	12 July 1819
An Act to defray the Charge of the Pay, Clothing and Contingent Expences of the Disembodied Militia in Great Britain; and for granting Allowances in certain Cases to Subaltern Officers, Adjutants, Quartermasters, Surgeons, Surgeons Mates and Serjeant Majors of Militia, until the Twenty fifth Day of March One thousand eight hundred and twenty. (Repealed by Statute Law Revision Act 1873 (36 & 37 Vict. c. 91))
Militia Pay (Ireland) Act 1819 (repealed)	59 Geo. 3. c. 117	12 July 1819
An Act for defraying, until the Twenty fifth Day of June One thousand eight hundred and twenty, the Charge of the Pay and Clothing or the Militia of Ireland; and for making Allowances to Officers and Quartermasters of the said Militia during Peace. (Repealed by Statute Law Revision Act 1873 (36 & 37 Vict. c. 91))
Assessed Taxes (No. 3) Act 1819 (repealed)	59 Geo. 3. c. 118	12 July 1819
An Act to give Relief in certain Cases of Assessment of Taxes in Great Britain, and to Persons compounding for their Assessed Taxes in Ireland, from an Annual Assessment for Three Years, from the Sixth Day of January One thousand eight hundred and twenty. (Repealed by Revenue Act 1869 (32 & 33 Vict. c. 14))
Allowance to Navy Agents Act 1819 (repealed)	59 Geo. 3. c. 119	12 July 1819
An Act to explain and amend an Act passed in the Thirty first Year of His Majesty King George the Second, (Note: Navy Act 1757 (31 Geo. 2. c. 10)) for the Encouragement of Seamen employed in the Royal Navy, as it relates to certain Allowances to Navy Agents. (Repealed by Pay of the Navy Act 1830 (11 Geo. 4 & 1 Will. 4. c. 20))
Registry, etc., of Colonial Slaves Act 1819 (repealed)	59 Geo. 3. c. 120	12 July 1819
An Act for establishing a Registry of Colonial Slaves in Great Britain, and for making further Provision with respect to the Removal of Slaves from British Colonies. (Repealed by Statute Law Revision Act 1861 (24 & 25 Vict. c. 101))
Smuggling Act 1819 (repealed)	59 Geo. 3. c. 121	12 July 1819
An Act to make further Regulations for the Prevention of Smuggling. (Repealed by Customs Law Repeal Act 1825 (6 Geo. 4. c. 105))
Trade with New South Wales Act 1819 (repealed)	59 Geo. 3. c. 122	12 July 1819
An Act to permit Vessels under a certain Tonnage to trade between the United Kingdom and New South Wales. (Repealed by Lascars Act 1823 (4 Geo. 4. c. 80))
Customs (No. 6) Act 1819 (repealed)	59 Geo. 3. c. 123	12 July 1819
An Act to empower the Officers of the Customs in Great Britain to allow Reports of Vessels' Cargoes to be amended; to require Goods which have been warehoused without Payment of Duties, or being prohibited, warehoused for Exportation, to be put on board Vessels by Persons licensed for that Purpose; to direct that Cocquet and Bond shall be required for Slate and Stone carried Coast wise; and to empower Officers of the Customs to administer Oaths. (Repealed by Customs Law Repeal Act 1825 (6 Geo. 4. c. 105))
Passenger Vessels Act 1819 (repealed)	59 Geo. 3. c. 124	12 July 1819
An Act for amending an Act made in the Forty third Year of the Reign of His present Majesty, (Note: Passenger Vessels Act 1803 (43 Geo. 3. c. 56)) for regulating the Vessels carrying Passengers from the United Kingdom to His Majesty's Plantations and Settlements Abroad, or to Foreign Parts, with respect to the Number of such Passengers, and for making further Provision for that Purpose. (Repealed by Statute Law Revision Act 1861 (24 & 25 Vict. c. 101))
Importation and Exportation Act 1819 (repealed)	59 Geo. 3. c. 125	12 July 1819
An Act to admit certain Goods imported from the East Indies to Entry and Payment of Duty without being warehoused; and to permit the Exportation of certain East India Goods to Guernsey and Jersey, and the Removal of certain East India Goods to Liverpool, Lancaster, Bristol and Glasgow, for Exportation. (Repealed by Customs Law Repeal Act 1825 (6 Geo. 4. c. 105))
Drawback on Coals Act 1819 (repealed)	59 Geo. 3. c. 126	12 July 1819
An Act for requiring the like Proof, to obtain Drawback of Duty on Coals used or consumed in calcining or smelting Tin, Copper or Lead Ores in the Counties of Devon and Cornwall, as is required on Coals used in Mines of Tin, Copper or Lead, in the said Counties. (Repealed by Customs Law Repeal Act 1825 (6 Geo. 4. c. 105))
Pauper Lunatics (England) Act 1819 (repealed)	59 Geo. 3. c. 127	12 July 1819
An Act for making Provision for the better Care of Pauper Lunatics in England. (Repealed by County Lunatic Asylums (England) Act 1828 (9 Geo. 4. c. 40))
Friendly Societies Act 1819 (repealed)	59 Geo. 3. c. 128	12 July 1819
An Act for the further Protection and Encouragement of Friendly Societies, and for preventing Frauds and Abuses therein. (Repealed by Friendly Societies Act 1855 (18 & 19 Vict. c. 63))
Insolvent Debtors (England) Act 1819 (repealed)	59 Geo. 3. c. 129	12 July 1819
An Act to continue in force, until the Expiration of Three Calendar Months after the Commencement of the next Session of Parliament, Three Acts of His present Majesty, (Note: Insolvent Debtors (England) Act 1813 (53 Geo. 3. c. 102)) (Note: Insolvent Debtors (England) (No. 2) Act 1813 (54 Geo. 3. c. 23)) (Note: Insolvent Debtors (England) Act 1816 (56 Geo. 3. c. 102)) for the Relief of Insolvent Debtors in England. (Repealed by Statute Law Revision Act 1873 (36 & 37 Vict. c. 91))
Insolvent Debtors (Ireland) Act 1819 (repealed)	59 Geo. 3. c. 130	12 July 1819
An Act to continue the several Acts for the Relief of Insolvent Debtors in Ireland, until the First Day of June One thousand eight hundred and twenty. (Repealed by Statute Law Revision Act 1873 (36 & 37 Vict. c. 91))
Exchequer Bills (No. 3) Act 1819 (repealed)	59 Geo. 3. c. 131	12 July 1819
An Act for raising the Sum of Sixteen millions five hundred thousand Pounds, by Exchequer Bills, for the Service of the Year One thousand eight hundred and nineteen. (Repealed by Statute Law Revision Act 1873 (36 & 37 Vict. c. 91))
Treasury Bills (Ireland) Act 1819 (repealed)	59 Geo. 3. c. 132	12 July 1819
An Act for raising the Sum of Two Millions British Currency, by Treasury Bills in Ireland, for the Service of the Year One thousand eight hundred and nineteen. (Repealed by Statute Law Revision Act 1873 (36 & 37 Vict. c. 91))
Appropriation Act 1819 (repealed)	59 Geo. 3. c. 133	13 July 1819
An act for applying certain Monies therein mentioned for the Service of the Year One thousand eight hundred and nineteen; and for further appropriating the Supplies granted in this Session of Parliament. (Repealed by Statute Law Revision Act 1873 (36 & 37 Vict. c. 91))
Church Building Act 1819 (repealed)	59 Geo. 3. c. 134	13 July 1819
An act to amend and render more effectual an Act passed in the last Session of Parliament, (Note: Church Building Act 1818 (58 Geo. 3. c. 45)) for building and promoting the building of additional Churches in populous Parishes. (Repealed by Statute Law (Repeals) Act 1974 (c. 22))
Highland Roads (Scotland) Act 1819 (repealed)	59 Geo. 3. c. 135	13 July 1819
An Act to repeal Two Acts, made in the Fifty fourth (Note: Military Roads, etc. (Scotland) Act 1814 (54 Geo. 3. c. 104)) and Fifty fifth (Note: Military Roads, etc. (Scotland) Act 1815 (55 Geo. 3. c. 121)) Years of the Reign of His present Majesty, for maintaining and keeping in repair certain Roads and Bridges in Scotland; to provide more effectuality for that Purpose; and for Regulation of Ferries in Scotland. (Repealed by Statute Law Revision Act 1873 (36 & 37 Vict. c. 91), Roads and Bridges (Scotland) Act 1878 (41 & 42 Vict. c. 51) and Local Government (Scotland) Act 1889 (52 & 53 Vict. c. 50))
Millbank Penitentiary Act 1819 (repealed)	59 Geo. 3. c. 136	13 July 1819
An Act for the better Regulation of the General Penitentiary for Convicts at Millbank. (Repealed by Millbank Prison Act 1843 (6 & 7 Vict.. c. 26))
Sale of Certain Lands in Worcester Act 1819 (repealed)	59 Geo. 3. c. 137	13 July 1819
An Act to enable the Directors of the Poor of the several Parishes within the City of Worcester, and of the Parishes united therewith, to sell and dispose of certain Lands, discharged of all Claims of the Crown in respect of any Forfeiture incurred under the Statutes of Mortmain. (Repealed by Statute Law Revision Act 1950 (14 Geo. 6. c. 6))
Land Tax Act 1819 (repealed)	59 Geo. 3. c. 138	2 July 1819
An Act for appointing Commissioners for carrying into Execution an Act of this Session of Parliament, for granting to His Majesty a Duty on Pensions and Offices in England; and an Act made in the Thirty eighth Year of His present Majesty, (Note: Land Tax Act 1797 (38 Geo. 3. c. 5)) for granting an Aid to His Majesty by a Land Tax to be raised in Great Britain for the Service of the Year One thousand seven hundred and ninety eight. (Repealed by Statute Law Revision Act 1873 (36 & 37 Vict. c. 91))

=== Local acts ===
Short title	Citation	Royal assent
Long title
Leeds to Harrogate Road Act 1819	59 Geo. 3. c. i	23 March 1819
An Act to continue the Term and alter and enlarge the Powers of Three Acts of His late and present Majesty's Reign, (Note: Yorkshire Roads (No. 3) Act 1751 (25 Geo. 2. c. 58)) (Note: Yorks Roads (No. 2) Act 1777 (17 Geo. 3. c. 77)) (Note: Leeds and Ripon Roads Act 1798 (38 Geo. 3. c. iv)) for repairing the Roads therein respectively mentioned and described, in the County of York; so far as the said Acts relate to the Road leading from the South west Comer of the Inclosures of Harrogate, through Knaresborough, to Boroughbridge.
Bristol Gas Act 1819 (repealed)	59 Geo. 3. c. ii	23 March 1819
An Act for lighting with Gas the City of Bristol, and certain Parishes adjacent thereto. (Repealed by Bristol United Gaslight Company's Act 1853 (16 & 17 Vict. c. lxxxiv))
Calton and Mile End (Glasgow) Improvement Act 1819	59 Geo. 3. c. iii	23 March 1819
An Act for regulating the Police of the Burgh of Calton and Village and Lands of Mile End, in the County of Lanark; paving, cleansing and lighting the Streets and Passages of the said District; and for erecting a Court House, Gaol, and a Bridewell or Workhouse therein.
Maiden Newton Roads Act 1819	59 Geo. 3. c. iv	23 March 1819
An Act to continue the Term and enlarge the Powers of Two Acts passed in the Eighteenth (Note: Somerset and Dorset Roads Act 1778 (18 Geo. 3. c. 95)) and Thirty eighth (Note: Roads from Barwick, Maiden Newton, Broadwindsor, Beaminster and Frampton Act 1798 (38 Geo. 3. c. xxii)) Years of His present Majesty's Reign, for repairing several Roads leading from the Town of Maiden Newton, in the County of Dorset, and other Roads communicating therewith, in the Counties of Somerset and Dorset.
British Plate Glass Manufacturers Act 1819	59 Geo. 3. c. v	23 March 1819
An Act to incorporate for a further Term the Governor and Company of the British Plate Glass Manufacture. (Note: British Plate Glass Manufacturers was commonly known as the British Plate Glass Company. It existed between 1773 and 1904.)
Nottingham and Derby, and Lenton and Sawley Ferry Roads Act 1819 (repealed)	59 Geo. 3. c. vi	23 March 1819
An Act for continuing the Term, and altering and enlarging the Powers of several Acts of His late and present Majesty, (Note: Notts and Derby Roads Act 1758 (32 Geo. 2. c. 38)) (Note: Derby and Nottinghamshire Roads Act 1780 (20 Geo. 3. c. 74)) (Note: Nottingham and Derby Road Act 1799 (39 Geo. 3. c. xii)) for repairing certain Roads therein mentioned, so far as relates to the Road leading from Chappel Bar, near Nottingham, to St Mary's Bridge in Derby, and from the Guide Post, in the Parish of Lenton, to Sawley Ferry. (Repealed by Nottingham and Derby, and Lenton and Sawley Ferry Roads Act 1827 (7 & 8 Geo. 4. c. xxvii))
Bagshot and Basingstoke and Odiham Roads Act 1819 (repealed)	59 Geo. 3. c. vii	23 March 1819
An Act for more effectually repairing the Road from the Golden Farmer, (Note: The Golden Farmer Inn, later named the Jolly Farmer, was located at the junction of the A325 and A30 between Camberley and Bagshot. 51°20′56″N 0°42′48″W) near Bagshot, in the County of Surrey, to Hertfordbridge Hill, (Note: The village of Hartfordbridge in Hampshire.) and from thence to Basingstoke and Odiham, and from Odiham to the Great Western Road at Bartley Heath in the County of Southampton; and also from Odiham aforesaid to a Place called the Bull Inn, in the Parish of Swallowfield, in the County of Wilts, on the Turnpike Road leading from the Town of Reading, in the County of Berks, to Basingstoke aforefaid. (Repealed by Basingstoke, Odiham and Alton Roads Act 1839 (2 & 3 Vict. c. xlv))
Abingdon and Chilton Pond Road Act 1819 (repealed)	59 Geo. 3. c. viii	23 March 1819
An Act for enlarging the Term and Powers of Three Acts, (Note: Berkshire Roads (No. 2) Act 1756 (29 Geo. 2. c. 81)) (Note: Berks Roads Act 1778 (18 Geo. 3. c. 99)) (Note: Abingdon Roads Act 1798 (38 Geo. 3. c. xliii)) for repairing the Road from Fryer Bacon's Study to Chilton Pond, and other Roads in the County of Berks, so far as relates to the Road called The Abingdon District. (Repealed by Abingdon and Chilton Pond Road Act 1841 (4 & 5 Vict. c. cxi))
Liverpool Markets and Tolls Act 1819	59 Geo. 3. c. ix	23 March 1819
An Act for abolishing the Payment of certain Tolls called Ingates and Outgates, collected at the several Entrances into the Town of Liverpool, in the County of Lancaster, and of certain Tolls and Stallage now payable in the Markets and Fairs there, and for granting other Tolls and Stallage in lieu thereof, and for the better Regulation of the said Markets and Fairs. (Note: Liverpool Improvement Act 1786 (26 Geo. 3. c. 12)) (Note: Liverpool Port and Town Improvement Act 1811 (51 Geo. 3. c. cxliii))
Lewes and Eastbourne, and Polegate and Hailsham Roads Act 1819 (repealed)	59 Geo. 3. c. x	23 March 1819
An Act for more effectually making, straightening, repairing and improving the Road from near the Town of Lewes to Polegate, in the Parish of Hailsham, and from thence to Eastbourne, and from Polegate to Hailsham Common, in the County of Sussex. (Repealed by Lewes, Eastbourne and Hailsham Turnpike Road Act 1856 (19 & 20 Vict. c. xcvi))
St. George the Martyr Holborn Parish Church and Churchyard Act 1819	59 Geo. 3. c. xi	31 March 1819
An Act for altering, amending and extending the Provisions of an Act passed in the Fifty sixth Year of His present Majesty, (Note: St. George the Martyr Holborn Parish Church Act 1816 (56 Geo. 3. c. xxviii)) for repairing and altering the Parish Church of Saint George the Martyr, in the County of Middlesex, and for making further Provision for the Rector of the said Parish, and for improving the Church Yard thereof.
Road from Keighley to Halifax Act 1819 (repealed)	59 Geo. 3. c. xii	31 March 1819
An Act for continuing and amending Three Acts of His late and present Majesty, (Note: Bradford and Wakefield Road Act 1753 (26 Geo. 2. c. 83)) (Note: Yorks Roads Act 1777 (17 Geo. 3. c. 73)) (Note: Keighley to Halifax Road Act 1795 (35 Geo. 3. c. 151)) for repairing the Road from Kighley to Halifax, in the West Riding of the County of York. (Repealed by Annual Turnpike Acts Continuance Act 1867 (30 & 31 Vict. c. 121))
Carlisle Canal Act 1819 (repealed)	59 Geo. 3. c. xiii	6 April 1819
An Act for making and maintaining a Navigable Canal from or from near the City of Carlisle, to the Solway Frith, at or near Fisher's Cross, in the Parish of Bowness, in the County of Cumberland. (Repealed by Port Carlisle Dock and Railway Act 1853 (16 & 17 Vict. c. cxix))
Breconshire Bridges over Rivers Senny and Usk Act 1819	59 Geo. 3. c. xiv	6 April 1819
An Act to enable the Justices of Peace for the County of Brecon to take down the present County Bridge over the River Usk, and to build Two new Bridges over the Rivers Senny and Use in lieu thereof.
Wapping Workhouse Act 1819 (repealed)	59 Geo. 3. c. xv	6 April 1819
An Act for raising a further Sum of Money, by Annuities or otherwise, for the purpose of erecting a Workhouse for the Use of the Poor of the Parish of Saint John of Wapping, in the County of Middlesex. (Repealed by Statute Law (Repeals) Act 2008 (c. 12))
Maidstone Improvement Act 1819 (repealed)	59 Geo. 3. c. xvi	6 April 1819
An Act to enlarge the Powers of Three Acts of His present Majesty, (Note: Maidstone Improvement Act 1791 (31 Geo. 3. c. 62)) (Note: Maidstone, Kent (Watching) Act 1796 (36 Geo. 3. c. 66)) (Note: Maidstone Improvement Act 1802 (42 Geo. 3. c. xc)) for paving, cleansing and lighting the Streets and other public Places within the King's Town of Maidstone, in the County of Kent, and better supplying the Inhabitants with Water; and for watching the said Town, and making public Wharfs therein. (Repealed by County of Kent Act 1981 (c.xviii))
Cheltenham Gas Act 1819 (repealed)	59 Geo. 3. c. xvii	6 April 1819
An Act for lighting with Gas the Town and Parish of Cheltenham and Precincts thereof, in the County of Gloucester. (Repealed by Cheltenham Gas Act 1856 (19 & 20 Vict. c. xxx))
Ireby, Kirkby Lonsdale, Kirkby Kendal and Milnthorp Road Act 1819 (repealed)	59 Geo. 3. c. xviii	6 April 1819
An Act for more effectually repairing the Road from the Toll House Beck in the Township of Ireby, in the County of Lancaster, to Kirkby Lonsdale and Kirkby Kendal, in the County of Westmorland, and through Kirkby Lonsdale to Milnthorp in the said County. (Repealed by Kirkby Lonsdale, Kendal and Milnthorpe Turnpike Road Act 1854 (17 & 18 Vict. c. cxlv))
Wellingborough and Northampton Road Act 1819	59 Geo. 3. c. xix	6 April 1819
An Act for enlarging the Term and Powers of an Act of His present Majesty, (Note: Wellingborough and Northampton Road Act 1797 (37 Geo. 3. c. 167)) for repairing the Road leading from a Place called Morton's Corner, in the Town of Wellingborough, in the County of Northampton, to the East End of Abington Street, in the Town of Northampton.
Gaslight and Coke Company Act 1819 (repealed)	59 Geo. 3. c. xx	7 April 1819
An Act to alter and enlarge the Powers of The Gas Light and Coke Company, and to amend Three Acts of His present Majesty (Note: Gas Light and Coke Company Act 1810 (50 Geo. 3. c. clxiii)) (Note: Gas Light and Coke Company Act 1814 (54 Geo. 3. c. cxvi)) (Note: Metropolis Gas Act 1816 (56 Geo. 3. c. lxxxvii)) relating to the said Company. (Repealed by Gaslight and Coke Company's Act 1868 (31 & 32 Vict. c. cvi))
Bermondsey Improvement Act 1819 (repealed)	59 Geo. 3. c. xxi	7 April 1819
An Act for lighting, watching and cleansing Long Lane, in the Parish of Saint Mary Magdalen, Bermondsey, in the County of Surrey, and the Streets, Lanes, Passages and Places contiguous or adjoining thereto within the same Parish. (Repealed by Bermondsey Improvement Act 1845 (8 & 9 Vict. c. clxxvii))
Manchester Highways Act 1819 (repealed)	59 Geo. 3. c. xxii	8 April 1819
An Act for providing that the several Highways within the Parish of Manchester, in the County Palatine of Lancaster, shall be repaired by the Inhabitants of the respective Townships within which the same are situate. (Repealed by Manchester Parish Highways Act 1851 (14 & 15 Vict. c. x))
Westminster Improvement Act 1819 (repealed)	59 Geo. 3. c. xxiii	8 April 1819
An Act for subjecting certain Streets and Places within and adjacent to the Parish of Saint James, Westminster, in the County of Middlesex, called Optional Streets, to the same Rates for paving, cleansing and lighting as the other Streets and Places within the said Parish; and for altering, so far as relates to the said Parish, certain Acts (Note: London Streets Act 1762 (2 Geo. 3. c. 21)) (Note: London Streets Act 1763 (3 Geo. 3. c. 23)) (Note: Westminster Streets Act 1763 (4 Geo. 3. c. 39)) (Note: Westminster Streets (No. 2) Act 1765 (5 Geo. 3. c. 50)) (Note: (6 Geo. 3. c. 54)) (Note: Westminster (Streets) Act 1771 (11 Geo. 3. c. 22)) (Note: Westminster Improvements Act 1790 (30 Geo. 3. c. 53)) for paving, cleansing and lighting the Streets and other Places within the City and Liberty of Westminster and Parts adjacent. (Repealed by London Government (City of Westminster) Order in Council 1901 (SR&O 1901/278))
Alconbury Hill and Peterborough Road Act 1819 (repealed)	59 Geo. 3. c. xxiv	8 April 1819
An Act for enlarging the Term and Powers of an Act of His present Majesty, (Note: Alconbury Hill and Norman Cross Roads (Huntingdonshire) Act 1798 (38 Geo. 3. c. xlviii)) for repairing the Roads from Alconbury Hill to Wansford Bridge, and from Norman Cross to Peterborough Bridge, all in the County of Huntingdon. (Repealed by Alconbury Hill and Norman Cross Roads (Lincolnshire) Act 1827 (7 & 8 Geo. 4. c. lx))
Road from Bury (Huntingdonshire) to Stratton near Biggleswade Act 1819	59 Geo. 3. c. xxv	8 April 1819
An Act for repairing the Road from Shelton's Lane in Bury, in the County of Huntingdon, to a House formerly called The Spread Eagle in the Hamlet of Stratton, in the Parish of Biggleswade, in the County of Bedford.
East India Company and the Nabobs of the Carnatic Act 1819 (repealed)	59 Geo. 3. c. xxvi	19 May 1819
An Act for further continuing, until the First Day of August One thousand eight hundred and twenty one, and from thence to the End of the then next Session of Parliament, the Powers granted by an Act of the Forty sixth Year of His present Majesty, (Note: East India Company and the Nabobs of the Carnatic Act 1806 (46 Geo. 3. c. cxxxiii)) for enabling the Commissioners acting in execution of an Agreement made between the East India Company and the private Creditors of the Nabobs of the Carnatic, the better to carry the same into effect. (Repealed by Statute Law (Repeals) Act 2008 (c. 12))
High Court of Chancery Act 1819 (repealed)	59 Geo. 3. c. xxvii	19 May 1819
An Act to alter and amend Two Acts of His present Majesty's Reign, (Note: Offices of Court of Chancery Act 1792 (32 Geo. 3. c. 42)) (Note: High Court of Chancery Act 1815 (55 Geo. 3. c. lxiv)) for making further Provision for certain Officers of the High Court of Chancery. (Repealed by Court of Chancery (Funds) Act 1872 (35 & 36 Vict. c. 44))
Glasgow Assay Office Act 1819 (repealed)	59 Geo. 3. c. xxviii	19 May 1819
An Act for establishing an Assay Office in the City of Glasgow. (Repealed by Hallmarking Act 1973 (c. 43))
Edinburgh and Glasgow Union Canal Act 1819	59 Geo. 3. c. xxix	19 May 1819
An Act for altering and amending an Act (Note: Edinburgh and Glasgow Union Canal Company Act 1817 (57 Geo. 3. c. lvi)) for making and maintaining a Navigable Canal from the Lothian Road near the City of Edinburgh, to join the Forth and Clyde Navigation near Falkirk, in the County of Stirling.
Liverpool Harbour and Isle of Anglesea Lighthouse Act 1819 (repealed)	59 Geo. 3. c. xxx	19 May 1819
An Act for improving the Lighthouse on the Isle of Anglesea, belonging to the Trustees of the Liverpool Docks, and for further amending the Acts (Note: Liverpool Docks Act 1709 (8 Ann. c. 8)) (Note: Liverpool Docks Act 1716 (3 Geo. 1. c. 1 Pr.)) (Note: Liverpool Dock Act 1737 (11 Geo. 2. c. 32)) (Note: Liverpool Harbour Act 1762 (2 Geo. 3. c. 86)) (Note: Liverpool Harbour Act 1785 (25 Geo. 3. c. 15)) (Note: Liverpool Harbour Act 1799 (39 Geo. 3. c. lix)) (Note: Liverpool Port and Town Improvement Act 1811 (51 Geo. 3. c. cxliii)) (Note: Liverpool Improvement Act 1813 (53 Geo. 3. c. clvi)) relating to the Docks and Harbour of Liverpool. (Repealed by Mersey Dock Acts Consolidation Act 1858 (21 & 22 Vict. c. xcii))
Shoreham Harbour Act 1819 (repealed)	59 Geo. 3. c. xxxi	19 May 1819
An Act to enable the Commissioners for improving the Harbour of New Shoreham, in the County of Sussex, to raise more Money for completing the said Harbour and the Works thereto belonging. (Repealed by New Shoreham Harbour Act 1876 (39 & 40 Vict. c. ccxi))
Burnley and Habergham Eaves Water Act 1819	59 Geo. 3. c. xxxii	19 May 1819
An Act for supplying with Water the Town of Burnley, and a certain Part of the Township of Habergham Eaves, both in the Parish of Whalley, in the County Palatine of Lancaster.
Aberdeen Court House and Gaol Act 1819	59 Geo. 3. c. xxxiii	19 May 1819
An Act to alter and amend an Act of the Fifty fourth Year of His present Majesty, (Note: Aberdeen Courthouse, City and County Offices and Gaol Act 1814 (54 Geo. 3. c. c)) for erecting and maintaining a New Court House and other Offices for the City and County of Aberdeen, and for providing and maintaining an additional Gaol for the said City and County, and for other purposes relating thereto.
Burnley Improvement Act 1819 (repealed)	59 Geo. 3. c. xxxiv	19 May 1819
An Act for paving, lighting, watching and improving the Town of Burnley, in the County Palatine of Lancaster. (Repealed by Burnley Improvement and Water Act 1846 (9 & 10 Vict. c. cxix))
St. Luke, Chelsea, Parish Church Act 1819 (repealed)	59 Geo. 3. c. xxxv	19 May 1819
An Act for building a new Church in the Parish of Saint Luke, Chelsea, in the County of Middlesex, and for other purposes relating thereto. (Repealed by London Government (Borough of Chelsea) Order in Council 1901 (SR&O 1901/265))
Mitcham Parish Church and Burial Ground Act 1819	59 Geo. 3. c. xxxvi	19 May 1819
An Act for repairing and enlarging the Church of the Parish of Mitcham, in the County of Surrey, and providing an additional Burial Ground thereto.
St. Hilds Chapel, Jarrow Act 1819	59 Geo. 3. c. xxxvii	19 May 1819
An Act for defraying the Expences incurred in taking down, rebuilding and enlarging the Chapel of Saint Hilds, in the Parish of Jarrow, in the County Palatine of Durham.
Boston Chapel of Ease Act 1819	59 Geo. 3. c. xxxviii	19 May 1819
An Act for building a Chapel of Ease in the Parish of Boston, in the County of Lincoln.
St. Pancras Select Vestry Act 1819 or the St. Pancras Improvement Act 1819 (repealed)	59 Geo. 3. c. xxxix	19 May 1819
An Act for establishing a Select Vestry in the Parish of Saint Pancras, in the County of Middlesex, and for other purposes relating thereto. (Repealed by London Government (Borough of St. Pancras) Order in Council 1901 (SR&O 1901/274))
Carlisle Gas Act 1819	59 Geo. 3. c. xl	19 May 1819
An Act for lighting the City of Carlisle, and the Suburbs thereof, with Gas.
Road from Kettering to Northampton Act 1819 (repealed)	59 Geo. 3. c. xli	19 May 1819
An Act for amending and keeping in repair the Road from Kettering to the Town of Northampton, in the County of Northampton. (Repealed by Kettering and Northampton Turnpike Road Act 1852 (15 & 16 Vict. c. xcix))
Road from Gloucester to Stroud Act 1819 (repealed)	59 Geo. 3. c. xlii	19 May 1819
An Act to enlarge the Term and Powers of Two Acts of His present Majesty, (Note: Gloucester to Stroud Road Act 1778 (18 Geo. 3. c. 98)) (Note: Gloucester and Stroud Road Act 1800 (39 & 40 Geo. 3. c. xcvii)) for repairing and widening the Road from the City of Gloucester to the Town of Stroud, in the County of Gloucester. (Repealed by Stroud, Painswick and Gloucester Road Act 1854 (17 & 18 Vict. c. xcv))
Wrexham and Pentre Bridge Road and Abermorddu and Mold Branch Act 1819	59 Geo. 3. c. xliii	19 May 1819
An Act for continuing the Term and enlarging the Powers of Three Acts (Note: Denbigh and Carnarvon Roads Act 1757 (30 Geo. 2. c. 69)) (Note: Denbigh, Flint and Carnarvon Roads Act 1779 (19 Geo. 3. c. 109)) (Note: Wrexham and Pentre Bridge Road Act 1800 (39 & 40 Geo. 3. c. xxxi)) of the Reign of His late and present Majesty, for amending several Roads therein mentioned, so far as relate to the Road from Wrexham in the County of Denbigh, to Pentre Bridge in the County of Flint; and for making a new Branch of Road from the said Road at a Place near Abermorddu to Mold, in the said County of Flint.
Trowbridge Roads Act 1819 (repealed)	59 Geo. 3. c. xliv	19 May 1819
An Act for repairing and improving the Trowbridge Roads in the Counties of Wilts and Somerset. (Repealed by Trowbridge Roads Act 1854 (17 & 18 Vict. c. lxxv))
Road from Bricker's Barn to the Kingsdown and Batheaston Road Act 1819 (repealed)	59 Geo. 3. c. xlv	19 May 1819
An Act for more effectually repairing the Road from Brickers Barn, in the Parish of Corsham, in the County of Wilts, to the Road leading from Kingsdown to Bath Easton, in the County of Somerset. (Repealed by Blue Vein and Bricker's Barn Turnpike Roads (Wiltshire, Somerset) Act 1829 (10 Geo. 4. c. lxxxiii))
Evesham and Alcester Road Act 1819	59 Geo. 3. c. xlvi	19 May 1819
An Act for enlarging the Term and Powers of Two Acts of His present Majesty, (Note: Evesham Roads Act 1778 (18 Geo. 3. c. 93)) (Note: Evesham and Alcester Road Act 1799 (39 Geo. 3. c. xi)) for repairing the Road from Evesham Bridge, (Note: The medieval bridge in Evesham, replaced by the Workman Bridge in 1856. 52°05′29″N 1°56′35″W) in the County of Worcester, to Alcester, (Note: The Globe Inn, which stood at the junction of Evesham Road and Swan Street in Alcester, Warwickshire. The site is now occupied by a roundabout. 52°12′50″N 1°52′20″W) in the County of Warwick.
Kilburn Bridge and Sparrow's Herne Road Act 1819 (repealed)	59 Geo. 3. c. xlvii	19 May 1819
An Act for continuing the Term and altering and enlarging the Powers of Two Acts of His present Majesty, (Note: Kilburn Road Act 1779 (19 Geo. 3. c. 120)) (Note: Kilburn and Sparrow's Herne Road Act 1799 (39 Geo. 3. c. xiii)) for repairing the Road leading from Kilburn Bridge, in the County of Middlesex, to Sparrow's Herne, in the County of Hertford. (Repealed by Metropolis Roads Act 1826 (7 Geo. 4. c. cxlii))
Harnham Hill, Blandford and Dorchester Road Act 1819 (repealed)	59 Geo. 3. c. xlviii	19 May 1819
An Act for enlarging the Term and Powers of several Acts of His late and present Majesty, (Note: Wiltshire and Dorset Roads Act 1756 (29 Geo. 2. c. 54)) (Note: Wilts Roads (No. 4) Act 1762 (2 Geo. 3. c. 66)) (Note: Wilts and Dorset Roads Act 1777 (17 Geo. 3. c. 83)) (Note: Harnham Hill Road Act 1798 (38 Geo. 3. c. xxvii)) for repairing the Roads from the Top of Harnham Hill, near the City of New Sarum, through Blandford and Dorchester, to Askerwell Hill; and from Harnham Hill aforesaid, to a House called Master Baker's Farmhouse, in the Counties of Wilts and Dorset. (Repealed by Harnham Hill, Blandford and Dorchester Road Act 1828 (9 Geo. 4. c. xxi))
Bromsgrove and Birmingham Road Act 1819 (repealed)	59 Geo. 3. c. xlix	19 May 1819
An Act for repairing the Road from Bromsgrove in the County of Worcester to Birmingham in the County of Warwick. (Repealed by Birmingham and Bromsgrove Road Act 1831 (1 Will. 4. c. xi))
Atcham and Dorrington Road Act 1819	59 Geo. 3. c. l	19 May 1819
An Act to continue the Term and alter and enlarge the Powers of an Act of His present Majesty, (Note: Salop Roads Act 1797 (37 Geo. 3. c. 172)) for repairing the Road from Atcham to Condover and Dorrington, and other Roads in the said Act mentioned, in the County of Salop.
Road from Clitheroe to Blackburn Act 1819 (repealed)	59 Geo. 3. c. li	19 May 1819
An Act for more effectually repairing the Road from Clitheroe to Whalley, and from thence to Blackburn and Mellor Brook, in the County Palatine of Lancaster; and for making a Branch of Road between Blackburn and Whalley. (Repealed by Clitheroe, Blackburn and Mellor Brook Roads Act 1839 (2 & 3 Vict. c. xxix))
Yeovil Roads Act 1819 (repealed)	59 Geo. 3. c. lii	19 May 1819
An Act for continuing and amending an Act of His present Majesty, (Note: Dorset, Devon and Somerset Roads Act 1800 (39 & 40 Geo. 3. c. lxi)) for repairing several Roads in the Counties of Somerset and Dorset, passing through or near the Town of Yeovil; and for repairing the Road from Mudford Bridge to Marston Elm, in the said County of Somerset. (Repealed by Yeovil and Ilchester Turnpike Trusts Act 1852 (15 & 16 Vict. c. cxiii))
Dewsbury and Ealand Road Act 1819 (repealed)	59 Geo. 3. c. liii	19 May 1819
An Act for enlarging the Term and Powers of Three Acts, (Note: Dewsbury to Elland Road Act 1758 (32 Geo. 2. c. 54)) (Note: Dewsbury to Elland Road Act 1779 (19 Geo. 3. c. 88)) (Note: Dewsbury and Ealand Road Act 1798 (38 Geo. 3. c. xxxix)) for repairing the Road from Dewsbury to Ealand in the West Riding of the County of York. (Repealed by Road from Dewsbury to Ealand Act 1836 (6 & 7 Will. 4. c. cxviii))
Stratford-upon-Avon and Edgehill Road Act 1819	59 Geo. 3. c. liv	19 May 1819
An Act for reviving and continuing the Term and enlarging the Powers of an Act of His present Majesty, (Note: Stratford to Edghill Road Act 1779 (19 Geo. 3. c. 91)) for repairing the Road leading from Stratford upon Avon to Edghill, in the County of Warwick.
Bude Harbour and Canal Act 1819	59 Geo. 3. c. lv	14 June 1819
An Act for improving the Harbour of Bude, in the County of Cornwall; and for making and maintaining a Navigable Canal from the said Harbour of Bude to or near the Village of Thornbury, in the County of Devon, and divers Branches therefrom, all in the said Counties of Cornwall and Devon.
Road from Crossford Bridge to Manchester Act 1819 (repealed)	59 Geo. 3. c. lvi	14 June 1819
An Act for more effectually maintaining and amending the Road from Crossford Bridge to the Town of Manchester, in the County Palatine of Lancaster. (Repealed by Road from Crossford Bridge to Manchester Act 1831 (1 Will. 4. c. vii))
Elgin Roads and Bridges Act 1819	59 Geo. 3. c. lvii	14 June 1819
An Act for more effectually making and maintaining certain Turnpike Roads in the County of Elgin; and for more effectually converting into Money the Statute Labour in the said County, for repairing the Highways and Bridges therein.
Durham and Berwick Roads and Bridges Act 1819 (repealed)	59 Geo. 3. c. lviii	14 June 1819
An Act for more effectually making, amending and maintaining certain Roads and Bridges in the Counties of Durham and Berwick, and Liberties of Berwick upon Tweed; for repairing and maintaining certain other Roads therein mentioned; and for improving the Entrance to the Town of Berwick upon Tweed. (Repealed by Roads and Bridges in Durham and Berwick Act 1829 (10 Geo. 4. c. lix))
Roads in Lanark, Ayr and Renfrew Act 1819 (repealed)	59 Geo. 3. c. lix	14 June 1819
An Act for continuing altering and enlarging the Terms and Powers of several Acts (Note: Ayr Roads Act 1789 (29 Geo. 3. c. 79)) (Note: Ayr Roads Act 1791 (31 Geo. 3. c. 95)) (Note: Glasgow Roads and Dalmarnock Bridge Act 1798 (38 Geo. 3. c. xx)) for making and maintaining certain Roads in the Counties of Lanark, Ayr, and Renfrew, and building a Bridge over the River Clyde at Dalmarnock, and for making and maintaining a Road from the Confines of the County of Ayr towards Sanquhar, in the County of Dumfries. (Repealed by Roads in Lanark, Ayr and Renfrew and Dalmarnock Bridge Act 1842 (5 & 6 Vict. c. cxii))
Hereford Roads Act 1819 (repealed)	59 Geo. 3. c. lx	14 June 1819
An Act to enlarge the Term and Powers of an Act of His present Majesty (Note: Hereford Roads Act 1810 (50 Geo. 3. c. lxxiii)) for repairing the Roads leading into the City of Hereford, and several Roads communicating therewith; for transferring the Road from Wormelow Tump to Harewood, from the Madley to the Hereford District, and for making a new Road from the Tuft Wood, in the Parish of Hentland, to the Confines of the Parish of Ganerew, in the County of Hereford, as a Third District. (Repealed by Hereford Roads Act 1835 (5 & 6 Will. 4. c. xxii))
Meath Hospital and County of Dublin Infirmary Act 1819 (repealed)	59 Geo. 3. c. lxi	14 June 1819
An Act for raising further Sums of Money for building and supporting the Meath Hospital and County of Dublin Infirmary. (Repealed by Statute Law (Repeals) Act 2013 (c. 2))
Coventry Canal Navigation Act 1819	59 Geo. 3. c. lxii	14 June 1819
An Act for amending several Acts of His present Majesty, (Note: Coventry Canal Act 1768 (8 Geo. 3. c. 36)) (Note: Birmingham Canal Navigation Act 1785 (25 Geo. 3. c. 99)) (Note: Coventry Canal Act 1786 (26 Geo. 3. c. 30)) relating to the Coventry Canal Navigation.
St. John the Baptist, Peterborough, Parish Church Act 1819	59 Geo. 3. c. lxiii	14 June 1819
An Act for repairing and altering, and taking down and rebuilding, certain Parts of the Parish Church of Saint John the Baptist, Peterborough, in the County of Northampton.
Lancaster Canal Navigation Act 1819	59 Geo. 3. c. lxiv	14 June 1819
An Act to alter and amend the several Acts (Note: Westmoreland Canals Act 1792 (32 Geo. 3. c. 101)) (Note: Lancaster Canal Act 1793 (33 Geo. 3. c. 107)) (Note: Lancaster Canal Act 1800 (39 & 40 Geo. 3. c. lvii)) (Note: Lancaster Canal Navigation Act 1807 (47 Geo. 3 Sess. 2. c. cxiii)) passed for making and maintaining the Lancaster Canal Navigation.
Blackburn Parish Church, Burial Ground and Rates Act 1819	59 Geo. 3. c. lxv	14 June 1819
An Act for taking down and rebuilding the Parish Church of Blackburn, in the County Palatine of Lancaster; and for providing additional Burial Ground, and for equalising the Church Rates in the said Parish, and other purposes.
Regent's Canal Act 1819	59 Geo. 3. c. lxvi	14 June 1819
An Act for altering and amending the several Acts (Note: Regent's Canal Act 1812 (52 Geo. 3. c. cxcv)) (Note: Regent's Canal Act 1813 (53 Geo. 3. c. xxxii)) (Note: Regent's Canal Act 1816 (56 Geo. 3. c. lxxxv)) passed for making a Canal from the Grand Junction Canal in the Parish of Paddington, to the River Thames, in the Parish of Limehouse, in the County of Middlesex.
Glasgow Water Act 1819	59 Geo. 3. c. lxvii	14 June 1819
An Act for altering and enlarging the Powers of an Act passed in the Forty sixth Year of the Reign of His present Majesty, intituled "An Act for supplying the City and Suburbs of Glasgow with Water." (Note: Glasgow Water Act 1806 (46 Geo. 3. c. cxxxvi))
Birmingham Gas Act 1819 (repealed)	59 Geo. 3. c. lxviii	14 June 1819
An Act for better supplying the Town of Birmingham, in the County of Warwick, with Gas. (Repealed by Birmingham Gas Act 1855 (18 & 19 Vict. c. xlviii))
Gloucester Gas and Poor Relief Act 1819	59 Geo. 3. c. lxix	14 June 1819
An Act for enabling the Governor and Guardians of the Poor of the City of Gloucester to light the said City with Gas, and to enter into the necessary Contracts for that Purpose.
Royal Exchange, Dublin Act 1819	59 Geo. 3. c. lxx	14 June 1819
An Act to provide for the election of Trustees of the Royal Exchange, Dublin.
Newcastle-Under-Lyme Improvement Act 1819 (repealed)	59 Geo. 3. c. lxxi	14 June 1819
An Act for paving, lighting, watching, cleansing, regulating and improving the Borough of Newcastle under Lyme. (Repealed by Ministry of Health Provisional Order Confirmation (Newcastle-under-Lyme Extension) Act 1921 (11 & 12 Geo. 5. c. lxviii))
Perth Improvement Act 1819 (repealed)	59 Geo. 3. c. lxxii	14 June 1819
An Act for altering and amending an Act of the Fifty first Year of His present Majesty, (Note: Perth Improvement Act 1811 (51 Geo. 3. c. xxxiv)) for paving, lighting and cleansing the City of Perth, and for maintaining Police and good Order within the said City. (Repealed by Perth Improvement Act 1839 (2 & 3 Vict. c. xliii))
St. Giles-in-the-Fields and St. George Bloomsbury Improvement Act 1819 (repealed)	59 Geo. 3. c. lxxiii	14 June 1819
An Act for better paving, cleansing and lighting the Parishes of Saint Giles in the Fields and Saint George Bloomsbury, in the County of Middlesex, and for vesting the sole Management thereof in the Vestrymen of the said Parishes, and a Committee of the Inhabitants thereof. (Repealed by London Government (Borough of Holborn) Order in Council 1901 (SR&O 1901/269))
St. Neots Improvement Act 1819	59 Geo. 3. c. lxxiv	14 June 1819
An Act for paving, lighting, cleansing and otherwise improving the Town of Saint Neots, in the County of Huntingdon.
Romford Improvement Act 1819 (repealed)	59 Geo. 3. c. lxxv	14 June 1819
An Act for paving and otherwise improving the Town of Romford, in the Liberty of Havering atte Bower, in the County of Essex. (Repealed by Local Government Board's Provisional Orders Confirmation (No. 2) Act 1908 (8 Edw. 7. c. cxliii))
Congresbury, Paxton, Winscombe, Banwell, Churchill, Kewstoke, Week St. Lawrence and Yatton Drainage Act 1819	59 Geo. 3. c. lxxvi	14 June 1819
An Act for draining, preserving from Water, and improving certain low Lands and Grounds, lying in the several Parishes of Congresbury, Paxton, Winscombe, Banwell, Churchill, Kewstoke, Week Saint Lawrence, and Yatton, in the County of Somerset.
Borough Fen Common Inclosure and Newborough Parish Act 1819	59 Geo. 3. c. lxxvii	14 June 1819
An Act to amend and enlarge the Powers of an Act of His present Majesty (Note: Newborough Parish Drainage, Inclosure and Church Act 1812 (52 Geo. 3. c. cxliii)) for draining, enclosing, and improving the Lands called Borough Fen Common, and the Four Hundred Acre Common, in the County of Northampton, and for forming the same into a Parish, to be called Newborough, and for building and endowing a Church for such Parish.
Bedford Level Drainage Act 1819 (repealed)	59 Geo. 3. c. lxxviii	14 June 1819
An Act for altering and enlarging the Powers of Two Acts of His present Majesty, (Note: Bedford Level and Swaffham Drainage Act 1767 (7 Geo. 3. c. 53)) (Note: Swaffham (Drainage) Act 1779 (19 Geo. 3. c. 34)) for draining and preserving certain Fen Lands and Low Grounds lying in the South Level, Part of the Great Level of the Fens called Bedford Level, and in the County of Cambridge, between the River Cam otherwise Grant, West; and the Hardlands of Bottisham, Swaffham Bulbeck, and Swaffham Prior, East; and for other purposes therein mentioned. (Repealed by Swaffham Drainage Act 1853 (16 & 17 Vict. c. lxi))
Eau Brink Act 1819 or the Bedford Level Drainage and Ouse Navigation Act 1819	59 Geo. 3. c. lxxix	14 June 1819
An Act for altering and enlarging the Powers of several Acts of His present Majesty, (Note: Eau Brink Act 1795 (35 Geo. 3. c. 77)) (Note: Eau Brink Act 1796 (36 Geo. 3. c. 33)) (Note: Eau Brink Act 1805 (45 Geo. 3. c. lxxii)) (Note: Eau Brink Act 1816 (56 Geo. 3. c. xxxviii)) (Note: Eau Brink Act 1818 (58 Geo. 3. c. xlviii)) for improving the Drainage of the Middle and South Levels, Part of the Great Level of the Fens called Bedford Levels and other Lands therein mentioned; and for improving the Navigation of the River Ouze, in the County of Norfolk, and of the several Rivers communicating therewith.
Bradford and Wakefield Road Act 1819	59 Geo. 3. c. lxxx	14 June 1819
An Act for more effectually repairing and improving the Road from Bradford to Wakefield, in the West Riding of the County of York.
Barnsdale and Thwaite Gate Turnpike Road Act 1819 (repealed)	59 Geo. 3. c. lxxxi	14 June 1819
An Act for making and maintaining a Turnpike Road to branch off from the Great North Road at the South End of Barnsdale through Pontefract, and from thence to a certain Place called Thwaite Gate, all in the West Riding of the County of York. (Repealed by Barnsdale and Thwaite Gate, and Leeds and Wakefield Roads Act 1827 (7 & 8 Geo. 4. c. lxxii))
Kington Roads Act 1819 (repealed)	59 Geo. 3. c. lxxxii	14 June 1819
An Act for continuing and amending Three Acts of His late and present Majesty (Note: Hereford Roads Act 1773 (29 Geo. 2. c. 65)) (Note: Hereford Roads Act 1773 (13 Geo. 3. c. 95)) (Note: Hereford Roads Act 1794 (34 Geo. 3. c. 119)) for repairing several Roads leading from the Town of Kington, in the County of Hereford, and for repairing several other Roads in the said County communicating with the Roads comprised in the said Acts. (Repealed by Kington Roads (Herefordshire) Act 1842 (5 & 6 Vict. c. lxxvii))
Road from Marlborough to Cote Act 1819	59 Geo. 3. c. lxxxiii	14 June 1819
An Act for making and maintaining a Road from Marlborough, to the present Turnpike Road at or near Coate, in the Parish of Liddington, in the County of Wilts.
Roads from Fryer Bacon's Study (Oxford District) Act 1819 (repealed)	59 Geo. 3. c. lxxxiv	14 June 1819
An Act to continue and amend Three Acts (Note: Oxford District of Farringdon Road Act 1798 (38 Geo. 3. c. lxv)) for repairing the Roads from Fryer Bacon's Study to Chilton Pond, and from the Top of Hinksey Hill to Foxcombe Hill Gate, in the Road leading to Farringdon, in the County of Berks, so far as relates to the Oxford District of the said Roads. (Repealed by Statute Law (Repeals) Act 2013 (c. 2))
Runcorn and Northwich Turnpike Road Act 1819	59 Geo. 3. c. lxxxv	14 June 1819
An Act for making and maintaining a Turnpike Road from Runcorn to Northwich, in the County Palatine of Chester.
Road from Shrewsbury to Preston Brockhurst Act 1819 (repealed)	59 Geo. 3. c. lxxxvi	14 June 1819
An Act for more effectually repairing and improving the Road from Shrewsbury to Preston Brockhurst, to Shawbury and to Shreyhill, and other Roads in the County of Salop. (Repealed by Annual Turnpike Acts Continuance Act 1872 (35 & 36 Vict. c. 85))
Biddulph and Dane-in-Shaw Road and Branch Act 1819 (repealed)	59 Geo. 3. c. lxxxvii	14 June 1819
An Act for making and maintaining a Road from the Tunstall and Bosley Turnpike Road at Gillow Hollow, in the Parish of Biddulph, in the County of Stafford, to Park Lane, communicating with the Congleton and Leek Turnpike Road, near Dane-in-shaw Bridge in the County of Chester, with a Branch to the said Tunstall and Bosley Turnpike Road at Lich Lane, in the said Parish of Biddulph. (Repealed by Biddulph and Congleton Road (Cheshire) Act 1837 (7 Will. 4 & 1 Vict. c. xxxviii))
Roads to and from Bridport Act 1819 (repealed)	59 Geo. 3. c. lxxxviii	14 June 1819
An Act for repairing, widening, improving and maintaining in Repair the several Roads leading to and from the Town of Bridport, and for making a new Line of Road to communicate with the same. (Repealed by Roads to and from Bridport Act 1830 (11 Geo. 4 & 1 Will. 4. c. v))
Bradford Roads and Stokeford Bridge Act 1819 (repealed)	59 Geo. 3. c. lxxxix	14 June 1819
An Act for repairing and improving several Roads leading to and from the Town of Bradford, in the County of Wilts; and for maintaining a Bridge over the River Avon, at Stokeford, in the said County. (Repealed by Bradford (Wiltshire) Roads and Stokeford Bridge Act 1841 (4 & 5 Vict. c. xcix))
Glasgow and Carlisle Road Act 1819	59 Geo. 3. c. xc	14 June 1819
An Act for altering and amending Two Acts passed in the Fifty sixth (Note: Glasgow and Carlisle Road Improvement Act 1816 (56 Geo. 3. c. lxxxiii)) and Fifty eighth (Note: Glasgow and Carlisle Road Act 1818 (58 Geo. 3. c. 44)) Years of the Reign of His present Majesty, for improving the Road from the City of Glasgow to the City of Carlisle.
Huddersfield and Penistone Road Act 1819	59 Geo. 3. c. xci	14 June 1819
An Act for enlarging the Term and Powers of Two Acts of His present Majesty, (Note: Halifax to Sheffield Road Act 1777 (17 Geo. 3. c. 106)) (Note: Huddersfield and Penistone Road Act 1798 (38 Geo. 3. c. xxiii)) for repairing the Road from Huddersfield to Penistone, in the County of York.
Leeds and Harrogate Road Act 1819 (repealed)	59 Geo. 3. c. xcii	14 June 1819
An Act for enlarging the Term and Powers of several Acts (Note: Yorkshire Roads (No. 3) Act 1751 (25 Geo. 2. c. 58)) (Note: Yorkshire Roads Act 1756 (29 Geo. 2. c. 71)) (Note: Yorks Roads (No. 3) Act 1777 (17 Geo. 3. c. 78)) (Note: Leeds and Harrogate Road Act 1796 (36 Geo. 3. c. 138)) relating to the Road from the Town of Leeds, through Harewood, to the South West Corner of the Inclosures of Harrogate, in the West Riding of the County of York. (Repealed by Road from Leeds to Harrogate Act 1839 (2 & 3 Vict. c. xxxii))
Heywood and Prestwich Road Act 1819	59 Geo. 3. c. xciii	14 June 1819
An Act to continue the Term and enlarge the Powers of Two Acts of His present Majesty's Reign, (Note: Heywood and Prestwich Road Act 1789 (29 Geo. 3. c. 110)) (Note: Heywood and Prestwich Road Act 1798 (38 Geo. 3. c. xlii)) for repairing the Road from Rochdale Lane End, in the Village of Heywood, to a Place called the Land's End in Prestwich, in the County Palatine of Lancaster.
Tadcaster and Halton Dial Road Act 1819 (repealed)	59 Geo. 3. c. xciv	14 June 1819
An Act for amending the Road from Tadcaster to Halton Dyal, in the West Riding of the County of York. (Repealed by Tadcaster and Halton Dial Road Act 1840 (3 & 4 Vict. c. lxxx))
Bristol Roads Act 1819	59 Geo. 3. c. xcv	14 June 1819
An Act for repairing, widening and improving the several Roads round the City of Bristol, and for making certain new Lines of Road to communicate with the same.
Roads from Pedmore to Holly Hall Act 1819 (repealed)	59 Geo. 3. c. xcvi	14 June 1819
An Act for enlarging the Term and Powers of Three Acts of His present Majesty, (Note: Worcester and Salop Roads Act 1762 (2 Geo. 3. c. 78)) (Note: Worcester Roads Act 1782 (22 Geo. 3. c. 95)) (Note: Roads in Worcester, Stafford and Salop Act 1798 (38 Geo. 3. c. xliv)) for repairing several Roads in the Counties of Worcester, Stafford and Salop, so far as relate to the Road leading from Pedmore to Holly Hall, and other Roads therein mentioned; and for repairing another Road in the said Counties of Stafford and Salop, or one of them. (Repealed by Pedmore and Rowley Road Act 1852 (15 & 16 Vict. c. lxxxvi))
Tenterden and Ashford Road Act 1819	59 Geo. 3. c. xcvii	14 June 1819
An Act for continuing the Term and enlarging the Powers of Three Acts of His present Majesty, (Note: Tenterden &c. Road Act 1766 (7 Geo. 3. c. 103)) (Note: Kent Roads (No. 3) Act 1786 (26 Geo. 3. c. 145)) (Note: Tenterden Road Act 1809 (49 Geo. 3. c. liv)) for repairing the Road from the Town of Tenterden to the Town of Ashford, in the County of Kent; and for making a new Branch of Road therefrom, to communicate with the Town of Biddenden, in the said County.
Roads in Merioneth, Montgomery, Denbigh and Salop Act 1819	59 Geo. 3. c. xcviii	14 June 1819
An Act for further continuing the Term and enlarging the Powers of Two Acts, passed in the Seventeenth Year (Note: Merioneth, Montgomery, Denbigh and Salop Roads Act 1777 (17 Geo. 3. c. 100)) and Thirty sixth Year (Note: Bala and Dolgelly Roads Act 1796 (36 Geo. 3. c. 147)) of His present Majesty's Reign, for repairing and widening several Roads leading to through and from the Towns of Bala and Dolgelly, in the County of Merioneth, and other Roads therein mentioned, in the Counties of Montgomery, Denbigh, and Salop; and for repairing several other Roads in the Counties of Merioneth and Denbigh.
Great Staughton and Wellingborough and Kimbolton and Brinton Bridge Roads Act 1819	59 Geo. 3. c. xcix	14 June 1819
An Act for continuing and amending Three Acts of His late and present Majesty, (Note: Kimbolton Road Act 1755 (28 Geo. 2. c. 33)) (Note: Hunts Roads Act 1774 (14 Geo. 3. c. 118)) (Note: Great Staughton and Wellingborough, and Kimbolton and Brington Bridge Roads Act 1799 (39 Geo. 3. c. xxx)) for repairing the Roads from Brown's Lane in Great Staughton, in the County of Huntingdon, to the Way Post near Wellingborough Bridge, in the County of Northampton, and from the Pound in the Kimbolton, to the Way Post near Brington Bridge in the said County of Northampton.
Nuffield and Faringdon Road Act 1819 (repealed)	59 Geo. 3. c. c	14 June 1819
An Act to continue the Term and enlarge the Powers of several Acts of His late and present Majesty's Reign, (Note: Berkshire Roads Act 1751 (25 Geo. 2. c. 21)) (Note: Berkshire and Oxford Roads Act 1765 (5 Geo. 3. c. 55)) (Note: Nuffield and Farringdon Road Act 1799 (39 Geo. 3. c. xxxvii)) for repairing the Road from the North East Corner of Nuffield Common, by the Parish Church of Nuffield, in the County of Oxford, through Wallingford to Wantage, and from thence to Faringdon, in the County of Berks. (Repealed by Nuffield and Faringdon Road Act 1841 (4 & 5 Vict. c. cvii))
Bedford and Woburn Road and Kempston Field Branch Act 1819 (repealed)	59 Geo. 3. c. ci	14 June 1819
An Act for enlarging the Term and Powers of Two Acts, passed in the Seventeenth (Note: Bedford Roads Act 1777 (17 Geo. 3. c. 94)) and Thirty sixth (Note: Bedford and Woburn Road Act 1796 (36 Geo. 3. c. 151)) Years of His present Majesty, for repairing the Road from Bedford to Woburn, and also the Road branching out of the same in Kempston Field, in the County of Bedford. (Repealed by Bedford and Woburn Road Act 1840 (3 & 4 Vict. c. c))
Road from Paddington to Harrow-on-the-Hill Act 1819 (repealed)	59 Geo. 3. c. cii	14 June 1819
An Act for continuing the Term and enlarging the Powers of an Act of His present Majesty's Reign, (Note: Road from Paddington to Harrow-on-the-Hill Act 1801 (41 Geo. 3. (U.K.) c. cxxix)) for amending the Road leading from Paddington to Harrow on the Hill, in the County of Middlesex. (Repealed by Road from Paddington to Harrow-on-the-Hill Act 1826 (7 Geo. 4. c. xci))
Dundee Harbour Act 1819 (repealed)	59 Geo. 3. c. ciii	14 June 1819
An Act to alter and amend an Act passed in the Fifty fifth Year of His present Majesty, (Note: Dundee Harbour Act 1815 (55 Geo. 3. c. xcvii)) for improving the Harbour of Dundee, in the County of Forfar. (Repealed by Dundee Harbour Act 1830 (11 Geo. 4 & 1 Will. 4. c. cxix))
Portsmouth and Arundel Navigation and Wey and Arun Junction Canal Act 1819	59 Geo. 3. c. civ	21 June 1819
An Act for giving further Powers to the Company of Proprietors of the Portsmouth and Arundel Navigation, and to the Company of Proprietors of the Wey and Arun Junction Canal, and to confirm an Agreement entered into between the said Companies.
Leeds and Liverpool Canal Branch and Railway Act 1819	59 Geo. 3. c. cv	21 June 1819
An Act to enable the Company of Proprietors of the Canal Navigation from Leeds to Liverpool, to make a Navigable Cut, and also a Collateral Branch or Railway, from their said Canal at Hennis Bridge near Wigan, to join the Duke of Bridgewater's Canal at Leigh, all in the County Palatine of Lancaster; and to amend the several Acts (Note: Leeds and Liverpool Canal Act 1770 (10 Geo. 3. c. 114)) (Note: Leeds and Liverpool Canal Act 1783 (23 Geo. 3. c. 47)) (Note: Leeds and Liverpool Canal Act 1790 (30 Geo. 3. c. 65)) (Note: Leeds and Liverpool Canal Act 1794 (34 Geo. 3. c. 94)) relating to the said Leeds and Liverpool Canal, and an Act (Note: Rochdale Canal Act 1794 (34 Geo. 3. c. 78)) for making the Rochdale Canal, so far as relates to certain Powers therein given to the late Duke of Bridgewater.
Sunderland Harbour and River Wear Navigation Act 1819 (repealed)	59 Geo. 3. c. cvi	21 June 1819
An Act to explain and amend an Act of the Forty ninth Year of His present Majesty, (Note: River Wear and Sunderland Harbour Improvement Act 1809 (49 Geo. 3. c. xli)) for repealing an Act of the Twenty fifth Year of His present Majesty, (Note: Sunderland Harbour Act 1785 (25 Geo. 3. c. 26)) for the Improvement of the River Wear, and Port and Haven of Sunderland, in the County Palatine of Durham; and for the more effectual Preservation and further Improvement of the same River, Port and Haven. (Repealed by River Wear and Sunderland Harbour Act 1830 (11 Geo. 4 & 1 Will. 4. c. xlix))
Newcastle-under-Lyme Gas Act 1819 (repealed)	59 Geo. 3. c. cvii	21 June 1819
An Act to establish a Company for lighting the Borough of Newcastle under Lyme with Gas. (Repealed by Newcastle-under-Lyme Gaslight Act 1855 (18 & 19 Vict. c. lxxvii))
Dumfries Improvement Act 1819	59 Geo. 3. c. cviii	21 June 1819
An Act to repeal Part of an Act made in the Fifty first Year of His present Majesty, (Note: Dumfries Improvement and Police Act 1811 (51 Geo. 3. c. cxlvi)) for paving, cleansing, lighting and watching the Streets, and otherwise regulating the Police of the Town of Dumfries.
Dublin and Navan Road Act 1819 (repealed)	59 Geo. 3. c. cix	21 June 1819
An Act for more effectually improving and repairing the Road leading from the City of Dublin to Navan, in the County of Meath. (Repealed by Dublin and other Roads Turnpikes Abolition Act 1855 (18 & 19 Vict. c. 69))
Roads in Dumfries Act 1819 (repealed)	59 Geo. 3. c. cx	21 June 1819
An Act for making and maintaining certain Turnpike Roads within the County of Dumfries, and the other Highways, Bridges and Ferries therein; and for more effectually converting into Money the Statute Labour in the said County. (Repealed by Roads in Dumfries Act 1829 (10 Geo. 4. c. cxi))
Regent's Canal Water Act 1819	59 Geo. 3. c. cxi	22 June 1819
An Act to vary and alter certain Acts of His present Majesty, (Note: Grand Junction Canal Act 1793 (33 Geo. 3. c. 80)) (Note: Grand Junction Canal Act 1794 (34 Geo. 3. c. 24)) (Note: Grand Junction Canal (No. 1) Act 1795 (35 Geo. 3. c. 8)) (Note: Grand Junction Canal (No. 2) Act 1795 (35 Geo. 3. c. 43)) (Note: Grand Junction Canal (No. 4) Act 1795 (36 Geo. 3. c. 25)) (Note: Grand Junction Canal Act 1798 (38 Geo. 3. c. xxxiii)) (Note: Grand Junction Canal Act 1801 (41 Geo. 3. (U.K.) c. lxxi)) (Note: Grand Junction Canal Act 1803 (43 Geo. 3. c. viii)) (Note: Grand Junction Canal Act 1805 (45 Geo. 3. c. lxviii)) (Note: Grand Junction Canal Company and Paddington Water Supply Act 1811 (51 Geo. 3. c. clxix)) (Note: Grand Junction Canal Act 1812 (52 Geo. 3. c. cxl)) relating to the Grand Junction Canals the Grand Junction Water Works, and the Regent's Canal, in order to effect an Exchange of Water, for the better Supply of the Regents Canal Navigation and Grand Junction Water Works.
West Riding Woollen Cloth Trade Act 1819 (repealed)	59 Geo. 3. c. cxii	2 July 1819
An Act for amending an Act of His present Majesty, (Note: West Riding Cloth Trade Act 1808 (48 Geo. 3. c. lxix)) respecting the Application of certain Surplus Monies paid for measuring, searching and sealing Woollen Cloth, in the West Riding of the County of York. (Repealed by West Riding Cloth Trade Regulations Act 1821 (1 & 2 Geo. 4. c. cxvi))
Tay Ferries Act 1819 (repealed)	59 Geo. 3. c. cxiii	2 July 1819
An Act for erecting, improving, regulating and maintaining Ferries and Passages across the River Tay, in the Counties of Fife and Forfar. (Repealed by Dundee Harbour and Tay Ferries Act 1873 (36 & 37 Vict. c. l))
Barnsley Church and Burial Grounds Act 1819 (repealed)	59 Geo. 3. c. cxiv	2 July 1819
An Act for repairing and improving, or rebuilding the Church at Barnsley, in the West Riding of the County of York, and for improving and enlarging the Church Yard and Burial Grounds thereof. (Repealed by Beckett Hospital and Dispensary, Barnsley Act 1944 (7 & 8 Geo. 6. c. ii))
Plymouth and Dartmoor Railway Act 1819 (repealed)	59 Geo. 3. c. cxv	2 July 1819
An Act for making and maintaining a Railway or Tramroad from Crabtree, in the Parish of Egg Buckland, in the County of Devon, to communicate with the Prison of War on the Forest of Dartmoor, in the Parish of Lydford, in the said County. (Repealed by Plymouth and Dartmoor Railway Act 1865 (28 & 29 Vict. c. cxxxi))
Edinburgh Water Company's Act 1819 (repealed)	59 Geo. 3. c. cxvi	2 July 1819
An Act for more effectually supplying the City of Edinburgh and Places adjacent with Water. (Repealed by Edinburgh Corporation Order Confirmation Act 1958 (7 & 8 Eliz. 2. c. v))
Cranstonhill Waterworks Act 1819	59 Geo. 3. c. cxvii	2 July 1819
An Act to enable the Company of Proprietors of the Cranstonhill Water Works to improve their Works.
Harwich Improvement Act 1819 (repealed)	59 Geo. 3. c. cxviii	2 July 1819
An Act for paving, cleansing, lighting and watching the Town of Harwich, in the County of Essex, and supplying the same with Water. (Repealed by Essex Act 1987 (c. xx) (Note: Incorrectly cited as "Essex 1987 (c.xxiv)" in the Chronological Table of Local Acts.))
Westminster and Holborn Improvement Act 1819 (repealed)	59 Geo. 3. c. cxix	2 July 1819
An Act for altering and enlarging the Powers of several Acts of His present Majesty, for amending and rendering more effectual several Acts (Note: St. Giles-in-the-Fields, Bloomsbury and Holborn Improvement Act 1807 (47 Geo. 3 Sess. 1. c. xxxviii)) (Note: St. Giles-in-the-Fields and St. George Bloomsbury Improvement Act 1819 (59 Geo. 3. c. lxxiii)) for paving, cleansing, and lighting the Squares, Streets, Lanes and other Places in the City and Liberties of Westminster, and Parts adjacent; and for putting certain Streets therein mentioned, commonly called Optional Streets, under the Management of Parochial Committees, subject to the Controul of Commissioners; and for other purposes, as far as the same relate to a Street and Passage, called Holborn and Middle Row, in the Parish of Saint Andrew Holborn above the Bars, in the County of Middlesex. (Repealed by London Government (Borough of Holborn) Order in Council 1901 (SR&O 1901/269))
Kensington Improvement Act 1819 (repealed)	59 Geo. 3. c. cxx	2 July 1819
An Act for paving, cleansing, lighting, watching, watering, planting and otherwise improving Edwardes Square, (Note: Edwardes Square.) Earl's Terrace, (Note: Earls Terrace.) Leonard Place, (Note: Leonard Place was located on Kensington High Street, between Earl's Court Road and Earl's Terrace.) Edwardes Place, (Note: Edwardes Place.) Kensington Place East, and Kensington Place West, in the Parish of Saint Mary Abbott's, Kensington, (Note: St Mary Abbots, Kensington.) in the County of Middlesex. (Repealed by Kensington Improvement Act 1851 (14 & 15 Vict. c. cxvi))
Pontypool and Usk Districts of Road Act 1819	59 Geo. 3. c. cxxi	2 July 1819
An Act to repeal so much of an Act of the Fortieth Year of His present Majesty, (Note: Magor and Chepstow Road Act 1800 (39 & 40 Geo. 3. c. xv)) for repairing certain Roads in the County of Monmouth, as relates to the Pont Pool and Usk Districts of Road, and for granting other Powers in lieu thereof, and for making a new Branch of Road from the said Usk District.
Adderbury and Oxford Road Act 1819 (repealed)	59 Geo. 3. c. cxxii	2 July 1819
An Act to continue the Term and alter and enlarge the Powers of an Act of His present Majesty's Reign, (Note: Adderbury and Oxford Road Act 1797 (37 Geo. 3. c. 170)) for repairing the Road from the Guide Post in the Village of Adderbury, in the County of Oxford, through Kidlington, to the End of the Mileway in the City of Oxford. (Repealed by Statute Law (Repeals) Act 2013 (c. 2))
Roads in Roxburgh and Selkirk Act 1819 (repealed)	59 Geo. 3. c. cxxiii	2 July 1819
An Act for making and maintaining several Roads in the Counties of Roxburgh and Selkirk. (Repealed by Roxburgh Turnpike Roads Act 1840 (3 & 4 Vict. c. lxvi))
Didbrook and Stow-on-the-Wold Road Act 1819 (repealed)	59 Geo. 3. c. cxxiv	2 July 1819
An Act for enlarging the Term and Powers of an Act passed in the Thirty fourth Year of the Reign of His present Majesty, (Note: Gloucester and Worcester Roads Act 1794 (34 Geo. 3. c. 135)) for repairing the Roads leading from the Town of Tewkesbury in the County of Gloucester, and other Roads therein mentioned, so far as such Act relates to the Road from Stump Cross in the Parish of Didbrook, to Stow on the Wold in the County of Gloucester. (Repealed by Statute Law (Repeals) Act 2013 (c. 2))
Pembroke Dock Market and Improvement Act 1819 (repealed)	59 Geo. 3. c. cxxv	2 July 1819
An Act for authorising the Commissioners of His Majesty's Navy to establish a Market at the Town of Pembroke Dock, in the County of Pembroke, and to make Regulations for the paving, lighting, cleansing and good Order of the said Town. (Repealed by Dyfed Act 1987 (c. xxiv))
Windsor Bridge and Approaches Act 1819	59 Geo. 3. c. cxxvi	6 July 1819
An Act to rebuild Windsor Bridge, in the Borough of New Windsor, in the County of Berks; and to improve the Avenues thereto.
London Bread Trade Act 1819 (repealed)	59 Geo. 3. c. cxxvii	13 July 1819
An Act to alter and amend an Act made in the Fifty fifth Year of the Reign of His present Majesty, intituled "An Act to repeal the Acts now in force relating to Bread to be sold in the City of London, and the Liberties thereof and within the Weekly Bills of Mortality, and Ten Miles of the Royal Exchange; and to prevent the Adulteration of Meal, Flour and Breads and to regulate the Weight of Bread within the same Limits." (Note: London Bread Trade Act 1815 (55 Geo. 3. c. xcix)) (Repealed by Statute Law (Repeals) Act 2008 (c. 12))
Banbridge and Belfast Road Act 1819 (repealed)	59 Geo. 3. c. cxxviii	13 July 1819
An Act for amending and keeping in repair the Mail Coach Road leading from Banbridge in the County of Down, to Belfast, in the County of Antrim. (Repealed by Turnpike Trusts Abolition (Ireland) Act 1857 (20 & 21 Vict. c. 16))

=== Private acts ===
Short title	Citation	Royal assent
Long title
Bitton Inclosure Act 1819	59 Geo. 3. c. 1 Pr.	23 March 1819
An Act for inclosing certain Lands in the Parish of Bitton, in the County of Gloucester.
Lamplugh Inclosure Act 1819	59 Geo. 3. c. 2 Pr.	23 March 1819
An Act for inclosing Lands in the Manor of Kelton and Arlecdon, in the Parishes of Lamplugh and Arlecdon, in the County of Cumberland.
Clane and Manheim Inclosure Act 1819	59 Geo. 3. c. 3 Pr.	6 April 1819
An Act for inclosing Lands in the Parishes of Clane and Manheim, in the County of Kildare.
Biddulph's Estate Act 1819	59 Geo. 3. c. 4 Pr.	6 April 1819
An Act for facilitating Partition of the Estates of Charlotte Myddelton Biddulph Widow, the Honourable Frederick Weft and Maria his Wife, and Harriet Myddelton Spinster, whereof Partition has been decreed to-be-made by His Majesty's High Court of Chancery.
Rodborne Inclosure Act 1819	59 Geo. 3. c. 5 Pr.	7 April 1819
An Act for inclosing Lands in the Tithing of Rodborne, in the Parish of Saint Paul, Malmsbury, in the County of Wilts.
Burnley Parochial Chapel Act 1819	59 Geo. 3. c. 6 Pr.	8 April 1819
An Act to enable the Curate and Patron of the Curacy of the Parochial Chapel of the Chapelry of Burnley, in the County Palatine of Lancaster, for the time being, to grant Leases of the Glebe Lands belonging to the said Curacy.
Countess De Durfort's Estate Act 1819	59 Geo. 3. c. 7 Pr.	19 May 1819
An Act for vesting a Moiety of a yearly Rent of Four hundred Pounds, discharged from certain Entails created therein, in Trustees, for Georgiana Amelia Countess de Durfort, in trust for Sale.
Spencer's Estate Act 1819	59 Geo. 3. c. 8 Pr.	19 May 1819
An Act for vesting certain Estates devised by the Will and Codicil of Mary Spencer Widow, deceased, in Trustees, to be sold for the Purposes therein mentioned.
Barnborough Inclosure Act 1819	59 Geo. 3. c. 9 Pr.	19 May 1819
An Act for inclosing Lands in the Parish of Barnbrough, in the West Riding of the County of York.
East Drayton Inclosure Act 1819	59 Geo. 3. c. 10 Pr.	19 May 1819
An Act for inclosing Lands within the Parish of East Drayton, in the County of Nottingham.
Beddington Inclosure Act 1819	59 Geo. 3. c. 11 Pr.	19 May 1819
An Act to amend an Act (Note: Beddington with Bandon Inclosure Act 1812 (52 Geo. 3. c. ccviii)) for inclosing Lands in the Manor of Beddington, in the Manor of Bandon, in the County of Surrey; and to determine the Boundary of the Parish of Beddington, and the adjoining Parish, upon a certain Common called Mitcham Common, Part whereof is intended to be inclosed under the said Act.
Martock and Muchelney Inclosure Act 1819	59 Geo. 3. c. 12 Pr.	19 May 1819
An Act for inclosing Lands within the Parishes of Martock and Muchelney, in the County of Somerset.
Durrington Inclosure Act 1819	59 Geo. 3. c. 13 Pr.	19 May 1819
An Act for allotting Lands in the Parish of Durrington, and in the Tithing of Knighton, in the Parish of Figheldean, in the County of Wilts.
East Rudham Inclosure Act 1819	59 Geo. 3. c. 14 Pr.	19 May 1819
An Act for inclosing Lands in the Parishes of East Rudham, West Rainham, and Helhoughton, in the County of Norfolk.
Farington Inclosure Act 1819	59 Geo. 3. c. 15 Pr.	19 May 1819
An Act for inclosing Farington Moss, and other Commons and Waste Grounds within the Manor and Township of Farington, in the Parish of Penwortham, in the County Palatine of Lancaster.
Peniston Inclosure Act 1819	59 Geo. 3. c. 16 Pr.	19 May 1819
An Act for inclosing Lands in the Township of Peniston, in the West Riding of the County of York, and for the Commutation of Tithes within the same Township.
Wensley and Snitterton Inclosure Act 1819	59 Geo. 3. c. 17 Pr.	19 May 1819
An Act for inclosing and leasing or letting certain Commons or Parcels of Waste Ground, called Oker Hill and Gross Green, within the Township of Wensley and Snitterton, in the Parish of Darley, in the County of Derby; and for applying the Rents and Profits thereof in aid of the Poors Rate of the said Township.
Yelling Inclosure Act 1819	59 Geo. 3. c. 18 Pr.	19 May 1819
An Act for inclosing Lands within the Parish of Yelling, in the County of Huntingdon, and for making a Compensation for the Tithes.
Stanton Lacy, &c. Inclosure Act 1819	59 Geo. 3. c. 19 Pr.	19 May 1819
An Act for inclosing Lands in the Parishes of Stanton Lacy and Bromfield, in the County of Salop.
Curacy of Morton's Estate Act 1819	59 Geo. 3. c. 20 Pr.	14 June 1819
An Act to authorise the Sale of Lands settled for the perpetual Augmentation of the Curacy of Morton, in the County of Salop.
Harrow School Estates Act 1819	59 Geo. 3. c. 21 Pr.	14 June 1819
An Act for enable the Keepers and Governors of the Possessions, Revenues and Goods of the Free Grammar School of John Lyon, within the Town of Harrow on the Hill, in the County of Middlesex, to grant Building Leases of certain of the Grounds and Estates heretofore of the said John Lyon.
St. Katherine's Hospital, Ledbury Act 1819	59 Geo. 3. c. 22 Pr.	14 June 1819
An Act to enable the Dean and Chapter of Hereford to rebuild the Almshouses of Saint Catherine's Hospital, in the Borough of Ledbury, in the County of Hereford; and for the better Regulation of the Affairs of that Charity.
Hereford Cathedral Act 1819	59 Geo. 3. c. 23 Pr.	14 June 1819
An Act to enable the Dean and Chapter of Hereford to discharge certain Debts incurred in repairing the Cathedral Church of Hereford.
Broadhurst's Estate Act 1819	59 Geo. 3. c. 24 Pr.	14 June 1819
An Act for empowering Trustees to sell certain Freehold and Copyhold Estates, devised by the Will of John Broadhurst Esquire, and to lay out the Purchase Money arising from the Sale thereof in the Purchase of other Estates to be settled in lieu thereof, and to the same Uses.
Charlett's Estate Act 1819	59 Geo. 3. c. 25 Pr.	14 June 1819
An Act for effecting an Exchange of certain Estates in the County of Worcester, in part devised by the Will of Arthur Charlett Esquire, and in part purchased under the Directions thereof, for certain other Estates in the Counties of Worcester and Hertford, belonging to James Wakeman Newport Esquire.
Fenton's Estate Act 1819	59 Geo. 3. c. 26 Pr.	14 June 1819
An Act for enabling William Archer Dixon, and other the Guardian or Guardians for the time being of Thomas Fenton, an Infant, to grant Building Leases of One Moiety of certain Freehold Lands called Spice Island, in the Parish of Saint George, in the County of Middlesex.
Moncreiffe's Estate Act 1819	59 Geo. 3. c. 27 Pr.	14 June 1819
An Act for vesting certain Parts of the Lands and Barony of Gorthy, comprised in a Deed of Entail made by the Trustees of David Stewart Moncrieffe Esquire, deceased, in Trustees, to sell the same, and apply the Purchase Money arising by such Sale in the Payment of the Land Tax due out of the said Estate, and certain other Entailed Estates descendible to the Heirs taking under the said Deed; for purchasing and entailing other Lands more conveniently situated; and for granting Power to feu certain Parts of the said Entailed Estate.
Duke of Devonshire's Estate Act 1819	59 Geo. 3. c. 28 Pr.	14 June 1819
An Act to confirm the Title of the Most Noble William Spencer Duke of Devonshire, to the Manors of Brindle and Inskip, and Estates in Brindle, Inskip and Eccleston, in the County of Lancaster.
Barmston Inclosure Act 1819	59 Geo. 3. c. 29 Pr.	14 June 1819
An Act for inclosing Lands in Winton cum Barmston, and Barmston, in the Parish of Barmston, in the East Riding of the County of York.
Thornton in Craven Inclosure Act 1819	59 Geo. 3. c. 30 Pr.	14 June 1819
An Act for inclosing; and exonerating from Tithes, Lands in the Manor and Parish of Thornton in Craven, in the County of York.
Aldington Inclosure Act 1819	59 Geo. 3. c. 31 Pr.	14 June 1819
An Act for inclosing Aldington Freight, otherwise Aldington Frith, in the Parish of Aldington, in the County of Kent.
Ingham Inclosure Act 1819	59 Geo. 3. c. 32 Pr.	14 June 1819
An Act for inclosing Lands in the Parish of Ingham, in the County of Norfolk.
Harlington Inclosure Act 1819	59 Geo. 3. c. 33 Pr.	14 June 1819
An Act for inclosing Lands in the Parish of Harlington, in the County of Middlesex.
Freeman's Estate Act 1819	59 Geo. 3. c. 34 Pr.	21 June 1819
An Act for vesting certain Estates in the Counties of Wilts, Warwick, Gloucester, Worcester and Durham, devised by the Will of Thomas Edwards Freeman Esquire, deceased, in Trustees, to be sold; and for laying out the Money arising from such Sale, in the Purchase of other Estates, to be settled, in lieu thereof, to the same Uses.
Holloway's Estate Act 1819	59 Geo. 3. c. 35 Pr.	21 June 1819
An Act for confirming and establishing Leases and Contra6ks for Leases made by the Trustees and Executors of the Will of Thomas Holloway Esquire, deceased, of certain Parts of his Freehold, Copyhold and Leasehold Estates and Property; and for enabling them to make Leases and Contracts for Leases of other Parts of the same Estates and Property, in manner therein mentioned.
West Walton (Norfolk) Inclosure Act 1819	59 Geo. 3. c. 36 Pr.	21 June 1819
An Act for inclosing Lands in the Parish of West Walton, in the County of Norfolk.
Joseph Evan's Charities Act 1819	59 Geo. 3. c. 37 Pr.	2 July 1819
An Act for incorporating the Trustees of the Charities of Joseph Evans, late of Belevan, in the County of Kilkenny, Esquire, deceased, and for vesting in the said Trustees so incorporated, Real and Personal Estates of the said Joseph Evans, for the Support of the said Charities.
Rolleston's Estate Act 1819	59 Geo. 3. c. 38 Pr.	2 July 1819
An Act for vesting the Settled Estates of Lancelot Rolleston, £squire, in Huknall Torkard, in the County of Nottingham, in Trustees, to be sold, for paying off Incumbrances, and for purchasing other Estates with the Residue of the Purchase Monies, to be settled to the same Uses.
Smÿth's Estate Act 1819	59 Geo. 3. c. 39 Pr.	2 July 1819
An Act to empower the Committees of Thomas Smÿth, Esquire, a lunatic, to grant leases of Estates vested in him as tenant in tail male, and for confirming certain leases already granted by them.
Smÿth's Estate (Camberwell Glebe) Act 1819	59 Geo. 3. c. 40 Pr.	2 July 1819
An Act to enable the Committees of the Estate of Thomas Smÿth Esquire to sign Consents to Leases of Parts of the Glebe belonging to the Vicarage of the Church of Camberwell, and for vesting Part of the Glebe in Trustees for Sale, for the Purposes therein mentioned.
Norton in Hales Inclosure Act 1819	59 Geo. 3. c. 41 Pr.	2 July 1819
An Act for inclosing Lands in the Parish of Norton in Hales in the County of Salop.
Pownall's Estate Act 1819	59 Geo. 3. c. 42 Pr.	6 July 1819
An Act for vesting the Estates devised by the Will of Hannah Pownall Widow, deceased, situate in the County of York, in Trustees, for Sale; and for investing the Purchase Money in the Purchase of other Estates, to be settled to the former Uses.
Earl of Aberdeen's Estate Act 1819	59 Geo. 3. c. 43 Pr.	6 July 1819
An Act for vesting in Fee-simple in the Right Honourable George Earl of Aberdeen, or the Heir of Entail in Possession, certain Parts of the entailed Lands and Barony of Fedderat, in the County of Aberdeen, upon entailing certain other Lands in the County of Aberdeen, equivalent in Value thereto.
Blunt's Estate Act 1819	59 Geo. 3. c. 44 Pr.	6 July 1819
An Act for vesting the Manor of Oram, and certain Messuages, Lands, Tenements and Hereditaments, in the County of Sussex, Part of the Settled Estates by the Will of Samuel Bunt Esquire, deceased, in Trustees, to be sold, and for vesting the Money arising from such Sale in the Purchase of other Estates, to be settled to the same Uses.
London House (Rebuilding) Act 1819	59 Geo. 3. c. 45 Pr.	6 July 1819
An Act for assisting the rebuilding of London House, belonging to the See of London.
Fayrer's Estate Act 1819	59 Geo. 3. c. 46 Pr.	6 July 1819
An Act for vesting certain Estates, devised by the Will of Joseph Fayrer, and now held in undivided Shares, in a Trustee, to be sold; and for investing the Purchase Monies of the Shares of such of the Parties interested as are Infants, in the Purchase of other Estates, to be conveyed to them, according to their respective Rights and Interests, in lieu of such Shares.
Bernard's Estate Act 1819	59 Geo. 3. c. 47 Pr.	12 July 1819
An Act to empower the Trustees of the Will, of the late Peter Bernard; Surgeon, to errant Building Leases of Land devised by his said Will, situated in the Town and County of Southampton.
Shaftoe's Charity Act 1819	59 Geo. 3. c. 48 Pr.	12 July 1819
An Act for amending and enlarging the Powers of an Act of His present Majesty, (Note: Shaftoe's Charity Act 1785 (25 Geo. 3. c. 34 Pr.)) for better regulating the Charity of John Shaftoe of Nether Warden, in the County of Northumberland.
Alvingham Inclosure Act 1819	59 Geo. 3. c. 49 Pr.	12 July 1819
An Act for inclosing Lands in the Parish of Alvingham, in the County of Lincoln.
Stolterforth's Naturalization Act 1819 (Note: This act was not printed by the King's Printer.)	59 Geo. 3. c. 50 Pr.	23 March 1819
An Act for naturalizing Sigismond Stolterfoth.
Hendrickson's Naturalization Act 1819	59 Geo. 3. c. 51 Pr.	23 March 1819
An Act for naturalizing Henry John Hendrickson.
Wickham's Naturalization Act 1819	59 Geo. 3. c. 52 Pr.	23 March 1819
An Act for naturalizing Eleonore Madelaine Wickham.
Chidham, Westbourne, and Warblington Inclosure Act 1819	59 Geo. 3. c. 53 Pr.	6 April 1819
An Act for inclosing Lands in the Parishes of Chidham and Westbourne, in the County of Sussex, and in the Parish of Warblington, in the County of Southampton.
Schwieger's Naturalization Act 1819	59 Geo. 3. c. 54 Pr.	6 April 1819
An Act for naturalizing Gotthold Erdman Frederick Schwieger.
Stoll's Naturalization Act 1819	59 Geo. 3. c. 55 Pr.	7 April 1819
An Act for naturalizing George Frederick Stoll.
Lord Selsey's Estate Act 1819	59 Geo. 3. c. 56 Pr.	19 May 1819
An Act to authorise the Cutting and Sale of a limited Quantity of Timber off the Estates of The Right Honourable John, late Lord Selsey, situated in the County of Sussex, for Payment of his Debts, and for imposing certain Restrictions on the cutting of Timber off the same Estates in future Years.
Rawridge Inclosure Act 1819	59 Geo. 3. c. 57 Pr.	19 May 1819
An Act for inclosing Lands, in the Manor of Rawridge, and Parish of Upottery, in the County of Devon.
Firsby Inclosure Act 1819	59 Geo. 3. c. 58 Pr.	19 May 1819
An Act for inclosing Lands in the Parish of Firsby in the County of Lincoln.
Sydling Inclosure Act 1819	59 Geo. 3. c. 59 Pr.	19 May 1819
An Act for dividing, allotting and inclosing certain Lands within the Parish of Sydling Saint Nicholas otherwise Broad Sydling, and Upsydling, in the County of Dorset.
Alvechurch Inclosure Act 1819	59 Geo. 3. c. 60 Pr.	19 May 1819
An Act for inclosing Lands in the Manor of Alvechurch, in the County of Worcester.
Hayden Inclosure Act 1819	59 Geo. 3. c. 61 Pr.	19 May 1819
An Act for inclosing Lands in the Tithings of Hayden, Hayden Wick, and Moreden, in the Parish of Rodborne Cheney, in the County of Wilts.
Leasingham Inclosure Act 1819	59 Geo. 3. c. 62 Pr.	19 May 1819
An Act for inclosing Lands in the Parish of Leasingham, in the County of Lincoln.
Over-Whitacre Inclosure Act 1819	59 Geo. 3. c. 63 Pr.	19 May 1819
An Act for inclosing Lands in the Parish of Overwhitacre, in the County of Warwick.
Selsey Inclosure Act 1819	59 Geo. 3. c. 64 Pr.	19 May 1819
An Act for inclosing Lands in the Parish of Selsey, in the County of Sussex.
Cumberworth Inclosure Act 1819	59 Geo. 3. c. 65 Pr.	19 May 1819
An Act for inclosing Lands in the Parish of Cumberworth, in the County of Lincoln.
Broughton Broughton Inclosure Act 1819	59 Geo. 3. c. 66 Pr.	19 May 1819
An Act for inclosing Lands, within the Manors of Great Broughton and Little Broughton, in the Parish of Bridekirk, in the County of Cumberland.
Greysouthen Inclosure Act 1819	59 Geo. 3. c. 67 Pr.	19 May 1819
An Act for inclosing Lands within the Township of Greysouthen, in the Manor of Five Towns with Eaglesfield, and in the Parish of Brigham, in the County of Cumberland.
Trelawny's Divorce Act 1819	59 Geo. 3. c. 68 Pr.	19 May 1819
An Act to dissolve the Marriage of John Trelawny with Caroline his now Wife, and to enable him to marry again; and for other Purposes therein mentioned.
Halford's Divorce Act 1819	59 Geo. 3. c. 69 Pr.	19 May 1819
An Act to dissolve the Marriage of Richard Halford the Younger, Banker, with Sarah Tournay Halford his now Wife, and to enable him to marry again; and for other Purposes.
Thomas's Divorce Act 1819	59 Geo. 3. c. 70 Pr.	19 May 1819
An Act to dissolve the Marriage of William Prockter Thomas, Clerk, with Arabella Maria his now Wife, and to enable him to marry again; and for other Purposes therein mentioned.
Clitherow's Divorce Act 1819	59 Geo. 3. c. 71 Pr.	19 May 1819
An Act to dissolve the Marriage of John Clitherow Esquire, Captain in His Majesty's Third Regiment of Guards, and a Lieutenant Colonel in the Army, with Sarah Clitherow, his now Wife, and to enable him to marry again; and for other Purposes therein mentioned.
Cresswell's Name Act 1819	59 Geo. 3. c. 72 Pr.	19 May 1819
An Act to enable Addison John Creswell, Esquire, and Elizabeth Mary his wife, and their Issue, to take and use the Surname and Arms of Baker, pursuant to the Will of John Baker, Esquire, deceased.
Wanostrocht's Naturalization Act 1819	59 Geo. 3. c. 73 Pr.	19 May 1819
An Act for naturalizing Vincent Wanostrocht.
Lord Blantyre's Estate Act 1819	59 Geo. 3. c. 74 Pr.	14 June 1819
An Act for vesting the Lands and Hereditaments comprised in the Deeds of Entail made by Sir Andrew Ramsay of Abbotshall, and George Muirhead Writer in Edinburgh, lying in the Parish of Whittingham. and Constabulary or Sheriffdom of Haddington, and now by virtue of the said Entails in the Possession of Robert Walter Lord Blantyre in Trustees, in trust to sell the same, and invest the Money arising by such Sale in the Purchase of other Lands and Hereditaments to be settled and secured to the same Series of Heirs, and under the same Conditions and Limitations, as are contained in the said Deeds of Entail; and for Payment to the said Robert Walter Lord Blantyre of what he has advanced for Redemption of the Land Tax of his entailed Estates.
Parkins' Estate Act 1819	59 Geo. 3. c. 75 Pr.	14 June 1819
An Act for vesting in Edward Parkins Esquire, and his Heirs, a certain Messuage, Lands and Hereditaments in Risden, otherwise Rishden, otherwise Rushden, in the County of Hertford, discharged from the Uses limited by the Will of Edward Sparhauke Esquire, deceased, and by the Marriage Settlement of the said Edward Parkins; and for substituting and settling another Messuage, Lands and Hereditaments, in Hertfordshire, in lieu thereof, and to the like Uses.
Bolton Inclosure Act 1819	59 Geo. 3. c. 76 Pr.	14 June 1819
An Act for inclosing Lands within the Manor and Township of Bolton, in the Parish of Calverley, in the West Riding of the County of York.
Hoveton St. John Inclosure Act 1819	59 Geo. 3. c. 77 Pr.	14 June 1819
An Act for inclosing Lands within the Parish of Hoveton Saint John, in the County of Norfolk.
Oakley Inclosure Act 1819	59 Geo. 3. c. 78 Pr.	14 June 1819
An Act for inclosing Lands in the Parish of Oakley in the County of Buckingham,
Alderton Inclosure Act 1819	59 Geo. 3. c. 79 Pr.	14 June 1819
An Act for inclosing Lands in the Parish of Alderton otherwise Aldrington, in the County of Northampton, and for extinguishing the Tithes thereof.
Paulerspury Inclosure Act 1819	59 Geo. 3. c. 80 Pr.	14 June 1819
An Act for inclosing Lands within the Parish of Paulerspury, with the Hamlet of Heathencote in the same Parish, in the County of Northampton.
Newman's Naturalization Act 1819	59 Geo. 3. c. 81 Pr.	14 June 1819
An Act for naturalizing Frederick Lewis Nelthorpe Newman.
Reutzsch's Naturalization Act 1819	59 Geo. 3. c. 82 Pr.	14 June 1819
An Act for naturalizing Sigismund Rentzsch.
Barton Inclosure Act 1819	59 Geo. 3. c. 83 Pr.	21 June 1819
An Act for inclosing Lands in Martindale, in the Parish of Barton, in the County of Westmorland.
Solihull Inclosure Act 1819	59 Geo. 3. c. 84 Pr.	21 June 1819
An Act for inclosing Lands in the Manor and Parish of Solihull in the County of Warwick.
Shotover Inclosure Act 1819	59 Geo. 3. c. 85 Pr.	21 June 1819
An Act for allotting Lands in the Parish or Liberty of Shotover, in the County of Oxford.
De Luigi's Naturalization Act 1819	59 Geo. 3. c. 86 Pr.	22 June 1819
An Act for naturalizing Samuel Domenico de Luigi.
Stanley's Estate Act 1819	59 Geo. 3. c. 87 Pr.	6 July 1819
An Act for regulating the Appropriation of the Revenues of certain Trust Estates, given by Walter Stanley for pious Purposes; for effectuating in a more extensive and beneficial Manner the general Objects of the Trust; and making a Provision for, and regulating the Appointment of, a Minister of a new Church intended to be built at West Bromwich, in the County of Stafford.
Indian Princes Loans Prohibition (Relief) Act 1819	59 Geo. 3. c. 88 Pr.	6 July 1819
An Act for giving relief to Messieurs Chase and Company, formerly Bankers of Madras, William Abbott and Richard Arthur Maitland of the same place, Agents and Merchants, and Thomas Parry, also of Madras, Merchant, against the provisions of an Act passed in the thirty-seventh year of His present Majesty's reign, intituled, "An Act for the better administration of Justice at Calcutta, Madras and Bombay, and for preventing British subjects from being concerned in loans to the Native princes in India, under the circumstances therein mentioned." (Note: East India Act 1797 (37 Geo. 3. c. 142))
Dunn's Divorce Act 1819	59 Geo. 3. c. 89 Pr.	6 July 1819
An Act to dissolve the Marriage of John William Dunn Esquire, with Eliza Papps Dunn his now Wife, and to enable him to many again; and for other Purposes therein mentioned.
Huth's Naturalization Act 1819	59 Geo. 3. c. 90 Pr.	6 July 1819
An Act for naturalizing Frederick Huth.
Bishop of Norwich's Estate Act 1819	59 Geo. 3. c. 91 Pr.	12 July 1819
An Act for effecting an Exchange between the Lord Bishop of Norwich, and William Assheton, Lord Suffield, (Note: William Harbord, 2nd Baron Suffield.) of the Moieties of certain Advowsons in the Counties of Norfolk and Suffolk.
Sir Henry Englefield's Estates Act 1819	59 Geo. 3. c. 92 Pr.	13 July 1819
An Act for appointing new Trustees for carrying into execution the Trusts and Powers contained in the Will of the late Sir Henry Englefield, Baronet.
Lord Edward Fitzgerald's Act 1819	59 Geo. 3. c. 93 Pr.	13 July 1819
An Act for restoring Edward Fox Fitzgerald, and his sisters, Pamela and Lucy Fitzgerald, children of Lord Edward Fitzgerald, deceased, to their Blood.

=== Sources ===
- The Statutes of the United Kingdom of Great Britain and Ireland, 59 George III. 1819. London. 1819 – via Internet Archive.
- The Statutes of the United Kingdom of Great Britain and Ireland, 59 George III. 1819. London. 1819 – via Google Books.
- Raithby, John, ed. (1819). "59° Georgii III". The Statutes of the United Kingdom of Great Britain and Ireland. Vol. The Seventh. From A.D. 1817, 57 George III. To A.D. 1819, 59 George III. London: Eyre and Strahan. pp. 645–1085 – via Internet Archive.
- Journals of the House of Commons. Vol. 74. London: His Majesty's Stationery Office – via Google Books.

== 60 Geo. 3 & 1 Geo. 4 ==
The second session of the 6th Parliament of the United Kingdom, which met from 23 November 1819 until 28 February 1820.

This session was also traditionally cited as 60 G. 3 & 1 G. 4.

=== Public general acts ===
Short title	Citation	Royal assent
Long title
Unlawful Drilling Act 1819 or the Training Prevention Act 1819	60 Geo. 3 & 1 Geo. 4. c. 1	11 December 1819
An Act to prevent the training of Persons to the Use of Arms, and to the Practice of Military Evolutions and Exercise.
Seizure of Arms Act 1819 (repealed)	60 Geo. 3 & 1 Geo. 4. c. 2	18 December 1819
An Act to authorise Justices of the Peace in certain disturbed Counties to seize and detain Arms collected or kept for purposes dangerous to the Public Peace to continue in force until the Twenty fifth Day of March One thousand eight hundred and twenty two. (Repealed by Statute Law Revision Act 1873 (36 & 37 Vict. c. 91))
Duties on Malt, etc. Act 1819 (repealed)	60 Geo. 3 & 1 Geo. 4. c. 3	18 December 1819
An Act for continuing to His Majesty certain Duties on Malt, Sugar, Tobacco and Snuff, in Great Britain; and on Pensions, Offices, and Personal Estates, in England; for the Service of the Year One thousand eight hundred and twenty. (Repealed by Statute Law Revision Act 1873 (36 & 37 Vict. c. 91))
Pleading in Misdemeanor Act 1819 or the Pleading in Misdemeanour Act 1819 or the Misdemeanours Act 1819 (repealed)	60 Geo. 3 & 1 Geo. 4. c. 4	23 December 1819
An Act to prevent Delay in the Administration of Justice in Cases of Misdemeanor. (Repealed for England and Wales by Administration of Justice (Miscellaneous Provisions) Act 1938 (1 & 2 Geo. 6. c. 63) and for Northern Ireland by Judicature (Northern Ireland) Act 1978 (c. 23))
Labour in Cotton Mills, etc. Act 1819 (repealed)	60 Geo. 3 & 1 Geo. 4. c. 5	23 December 1819
An Act to amend an Act of the last Session of Parliament, (Note: Cotton Mills and Factories Act 1819 (59 Geo. 3. c. 66)) to make further Provision for the Regulation of Cotton Mills and Factories, and for the Preservation of the Health of young Persons employed therein. (Repealed by Labour in Cotton Mills Act 1831 (1 & 2 Will. 4. c. 39))
Seditious Meetings, etc. Act 1819 (repealed)	60 Geo. 3 & 1 Geo. 4. c. 6	24 December 1819
An Act for more effectually preventing Seditious Meetings and Assemblies; to continue in force until the End of the Session of Parliament next after five Years from the passing of the Act. (Repealed by Statute Law Revision Act 1873 (36 & 37 Vict. c. 91))
Parliamentary Elections Act 1819 (repealed)	60 Geo. 3 & 1 Geo. 4. c. 7	24 December 1819
An Act to amend an Act of the Forty second Year of the Reign of His present Majesty, (Note: Controverted Elections Act 1802 (42 Geo. 3. c. 84)) for regulating the Trial of controverted Elections or Returns of Members to serve in the United Parliament for Ireland. (Repealed by Statute Law Revision Act 1873 (36 & 37 Vict. c. 91))
Criminal Libel Act 1819 or the Blasphemous and Seditious Libels Act 1819	60 Geo. 3 & 1 Geo. 4. c. 8	30 December 1819
An Act for the more effectual Prevention and Punishment of blasphemous and seditious Libels.
Newspapers, etc. Act 1819 (Note: This was the last act of the reign of King George III.) or the Newspaper and Stamp Duties Act 1819 (repealed)	60 Geo. 3 & 1 Geo. 4. c. 9	30 December 1819
An Act to subject certain Publications to the Duties of Stamps upon Newspapers and to make other Regulations for restraining the Abuses arising from the Publication of blasphemous and seditious Libels. (Repealed by Newspapers, Printers, and Reading Rooms Repeal Act 1869 (32 & 33 Vict. c. 24))

=== Local acts ===
Short title	Citation	Royal assent
Long title
Bread Industry (London) Act 1819 (repealed)	60 Geo. 3 & 1 Geo. 4. c. i	30 December 1819
An Act to continue until the Twenty fourth Day of June One thousand eight hundred and twenty, an Act passed in the Fifty ninth Year of His present Majesty, (Note: London Bread Trade Act 1819 (59 Geo. 3. c. cxxvii)) intituled "An Act to alter and amend an Act made in the Fifty fifth Year of the Reign of His present Majesty, (Note: London Bread Trade Act 1815 (55 Geo. 3. c. xcix)) intituled 'An Act to repeal the Acts now in force relating to Bread to be sold in the City of London and the Liberties thereof, and within the Weekly Bills of Mortality and Ten Miles of the Royal Exchange; and to prevent the Adulteration of Meal, Flour and Bread, and to regulate the Weights of Bread within the same Limits.'" (Repealed by Statute Law (Repeals) Act 2008 (c. 12))

=== Private acts ===
Short title	Citation	Royal assent
Long title
Lexden Inclosure Act 1819 (Note: This act was not printed by the King's Printer.)	60 Geo. 3 & 1 Geo. 4. c. 1 Pr.	30 December 1819
An Act for inclosing Lands in the Manor and Parish of Lexden, within the Liberties of the Borough of Colchester, in the County of Essex.
Wythop Inclosure Act 1819	60 Geo. 3 & 1 Geo. 4. c. 2 Pr.	30 December 1819
An Act for inclosing Lands within the Manor of Wythop, in the Parish of Brigham, in the County of Cumberland.

=== Sources ===
- "60° Geo. III. & 1° Geo. IV.". The Statutes of the United Kingdom of Great Britain and Ireland, 60 Geo. III. & 1 Geo. IV. 1819-1820. And 1 Geo. IV. 1820. London. 1820. pp. 1–67 – via Google Books.
- Journals of the House of Commons. Vol. 75: Sess. 1819-20 and 1820. London: His Majesty's Stationery Office. pp. 3–85 – via Google Books.

== See also ==
- List of acts of the Parliament of the United Kingdom
