= Radicals (UK) =

British Parliamentary grouping, 1763–1859

- Historical leaders: William Beckford; Jeremy Bentham; John Cartwright; James Mill; William Molesworth; Charles Dilke
- Founded: 1763
- Dissolved: 1859
- Preceded by: Country Party; Levellers; Radical Whigs
- Merged into: Liberal Party
- Newspaper: The Westminster Review; The Black Dwarf
- Grassroots wing: Hampden Clubs
- Ideology: Radicalism; Factions: Pro-American Revolution; Jacobinism (1790–1804); Chartism (1838–1859); Utilitarianism
- Political position: Left-wing
- Colours: Red

The Radicals were a loose parliamentary political grouping in Great Britain and Ireland in the early to mid-19th century who drew on earlier ideas of radicalism and helped to transform the Whigs into the Liberal Party.

== History ==
=== Early Radicals ===
The Radical movement arose in the late 18th century to support parliamentary reform, with additional aims including lower taxes and the abolition of sinecures. John Wilkes's reformist efforts in the 1760s, as editor of The North Briton and as an MP, were seen as radical at the time, but support dropped away after the Massacre of St George's Fields in 1768. Working class and middle class "Popular Radicals" agitated to demand the right to vote and assert other rights, including freedom of the press and relief from economic distress, while "Philosophic Radicals" strongly supported parliamentary reform, but were generally hostile to the arguments and tactics of the Popular Radicals. However, the term "Radical" itself, as opposed to "reformer" or "Radical Reformer", only emerged in 1819 during the upsurge of protest following the successful conclusion of the Napoleonic War. Henry "Orator" Hunt was the main speaker at the Manchester meeting in 1819 that ended in the Peterloo Massacre; Hunt was elected MP for the Preston division in 1830–1832. The "root and branch" of the reforms which the adjective radical suggests, and at the time still strongly in concept denoted by reference to all its previous main uses, is the English constitution, which is not codified or restricted to particular customs, laws or documents.

=== Radicals and the Great Reform Act ===
Radicals inside and outside Parliament were divided over the merits of the Whig Reform Act 1832. Some continued to press for the ballot and universal suffrage, but the majority (as mobilised in unions like the Birmingham Political Union) saw abolition of the rotten boroughs as a major step towards the destruction of what they called "Old Corruption" or "The Thing": "In consequence of the boroughs, all our institutions are partial, oppressive, and aristocratic. We have an aristocratic church, an aristocratic bar, an aristocratic game-code, aristocratic taxation....all is privilege".

The 1832 parliament elected on the new franchise – which raised the percentage of the adult population eligible to vote from some 3% to 6% – contained some 50 or 60 Radicals. This number shortly doubled in the 1835 election, leading many to envisage a House of Commons eventually divided between Radicals on the one side and conservatives (Tories and Whigs) on the other.

In fact, the Radicals failed either to take over an existing party, or to create a new, third force and there were three main reasons. The first was the continuing strength of Whig electoral power in the half-century following the Reform Act 1832. The latter had expressly been designed to preserve Whig landlord influence in the counties and the remaining small borough – one reason a radical like Henry Hetherington condemned the bill as "an invitation to the shopocrats of the enfranchised towns to join the Whiggocrats of the country". Whigs were also able to profit in two-member constituencies from electoral pacts made with a more reforming candidate.

Secondly, there was the widening body of reforming opinion inside (and outside) Parliament concerned with other, unrelated causes, including international liberalism, anti-slavery, educational and pro-temperance reforms, admissibility of non-Anglicans ("nonconformists") to positions of power. The latter expanded later to disestablishmentarianism which replaced the old local government units of the simple parish unit vestry by the mid-nineteenth century, devising instead civil (non-religious) parishes for almost all areas.

Thirdly, the Radicals were always more a body of opinion than a structured force. They lacked any party organisation, formal leadership, or unified ideology. Instead, humanitarian Radicals opposed philosophic Radicals over the Factory Acts; political Radicals seeking a slimmed-down executive opposed Benthamite interventionists; universal suffrage men competed for time and resources with free traders – the Manchester men.

By 1859, the Radicals had come together with the Whigs and the anti-protectionist Tory Peelites to form the Liberal Party, though with the New Radicalism of figures like Joseph Chamberlain they continued to have a distinctive political influence into the closing years of the nineteenth century.

=== Continuing agitation and reform ===
Following the Reform Act 1832, popular demand for wider suffrage was taken up by the mainly working-class movement Chartism. Meanwhile, Radical leaders like Richard Cobden and John Bright in the middle class Anti-Corn Law League emerged to oppose the existing duties on imported grain which helped farmers and landowners by raising the price of food, but which harmed consumers and manufacturers. After the success of the League on the one hand and the failure of Chartist mass demonstrations and petitions in 1848 to sway Parliament on the other, demand for suffrage and parliamentary reform slowly re-emerged through the parliamentary radicals.

By 1866, with agitation from John Bright and the Reform League, the Liberal Prime Minister Earl Russell introduced a modest bill which was defeated by both Tories and reform Liberals, forcing the government to resign. A Conservative minority government led by the Earl of Derby and Benjamin Disraeli took office and introduced the Reform Act 1867 – which almost doubled the electorate, giving many working men the vote – in a somewhat opportunistic party fashion.

Further Radical pressure led to the Ballot Act 1872 and the Corrupt and Illegal Practices Prevention Act 1883, followed by the Representation of the People Act 1884. Progressive liberals like John Morley and Joseph Chamberlain continued to value radicalism as a unifying bridge between the classes, and a common goal. However, in 1886 Chamberlain helped form the breakaway Liberal Unionist Party that mostly supported Conservative governments. The long career of David Lloyd George saw him moving from radical views in the 1890s to becoming prime minister in a postwar coalition with the Conservatives in 1918. From 1900 and the rise of the Labour Party and the gradual achievement of the majority of the original Radical goals, Parliamentary Radicalism ceased to function as a political force in the early twentieth century.

=== Disappearance as a political party ===
Radicals were absorbed by the Liberal Party by 1859, but did show their presence as a faction of the Liberal Party.

== Literary echoes ==
- Felix Holt, the Radical (1866), a social novel written by George Eliot, offered a positive view of an idealistic and well-educated committed Radical.
- Beauchamp's Career (1875), a satirical novel written by George Meredith. It portrays life and love in upper-class Radical circles and satirises the Conservative establishment.
- Anthony Trollope offered a more shaded view in his outline for The Way We Live Now (1875), describing his anti-hero as "A scapegrace. Has glimmerings of Radical policy for the good of the people". Economically liberal and laissez-faire, Trollope finds non-radicalism bucolic, extolling the rural county of Suffolk: "The people are hearty, and radicalism is not quite so rampant as it is elsewhere. The poor people touch their hats, and the rich people think of the poor."
- The Difference Engine (1990), an alternative history ("Steampunk") novel by William Gibson and Bruce Sterling, partially based on Sybil, or The Two Nations by Benjamin Disraeli, which includes a fictional Industrial Radical Party.

== Prominent Radicals ==
- Thomas Attwood
- William Beckford
- Edward Spencer Beesly
- Jeremy Bentham
- John Biggs
- John Bright
- Timothy Brown
- Charles Buller
- Lord Byron
- Richard Carlile
- John Cartwright
- William Cobbett
- Richard Cobden
- Sir Charles Dilke
- George Ensor
- Charles James Fox
- William Godwin
- George Peabody Gooch
- Thomas Hill Green
- George Grote
- Thomas Hardy
- Frederic Harrison
- William Hazlitt
- Thomas Hodgskin
- Thomas Holcroft
- George Holyoake
- William Hone
- Henry Hunt
- Leigh Hunt
- Douglas William Jerrold
- Walter Savage Landor
- James Mill
- John Stuart Mill
- Sir William Molesworth
- George Odger
- Thomas Paine
- Joseph Parkes
- Francis Place
- Richard Price
- Joseph Priestley
- John Arthur Roebuck
- Percy Bysshe Shelley
- Thomas Spence
- Edward John Trelawny
- John Wilkes
- Mary Wollstonecraft
- Thomas Jonathan Wooler
- Christopher Wyvill

== See also ==
- Foxite
- Hampden Clubs
- Liberalism in the United Kingdom
- Philosophical Radicals
- Popular democracy
- Socialism in the United Kingdom
- The British Reform Movement
- Owenism
- National Union of the Working Classes
- Radical Reform Association
- Metropolitan Political Union

== Bibliography ==
- Evans, E. J. (2000). Parliamentary Reform in Britain, c.1770–1918. Harlow: Longman. ISBN 0582294673.
- Harling, Philip (1996). The Waning of "Old Corruption": the politics of economical reform in Britain, 1779–1846. Oxford: Clarendon Press. ISBN 9780191676772.
- Harris, William (1885). The History of the Radical Party in Parliament. London: Kegan Paul, Trench & Co.
- Worrall, David (1992). Radical Culture: discourse, resistance and surveillance, 1790–1820. New York/London: Harvester Wheatsheaf. ISBN 0745009603.
