= William Devonshire Saull =

William Devonshire Saull (21 April 1783 – 26 April 1855) was an English wine merchant, who ploughed his profits into radical and socialist causes. A freethinker, he ran a fossil- and antiquities-based museum of evolution in London from 1831 to 1855, specifically for the working classes.

== Life ==
Saull was born at Byfield, Northamptonshire on 21 April 1783, the son of William Saul and Elizabeth Devonshire. He married Elizabeth Weedon in 1808. He was a wine merchant of the firm of Saull & Saddington. He was in business at 19 Aldersgate Street, London, and then moved a few doors to 15 Aldersgate Street which also was his residence, around 1830.

== Collector ==
Saull accumulated at 15 Aldersgate Street a large geological collection, together with some antiquities, mostly from London. It was described by John Timbs in 1855:

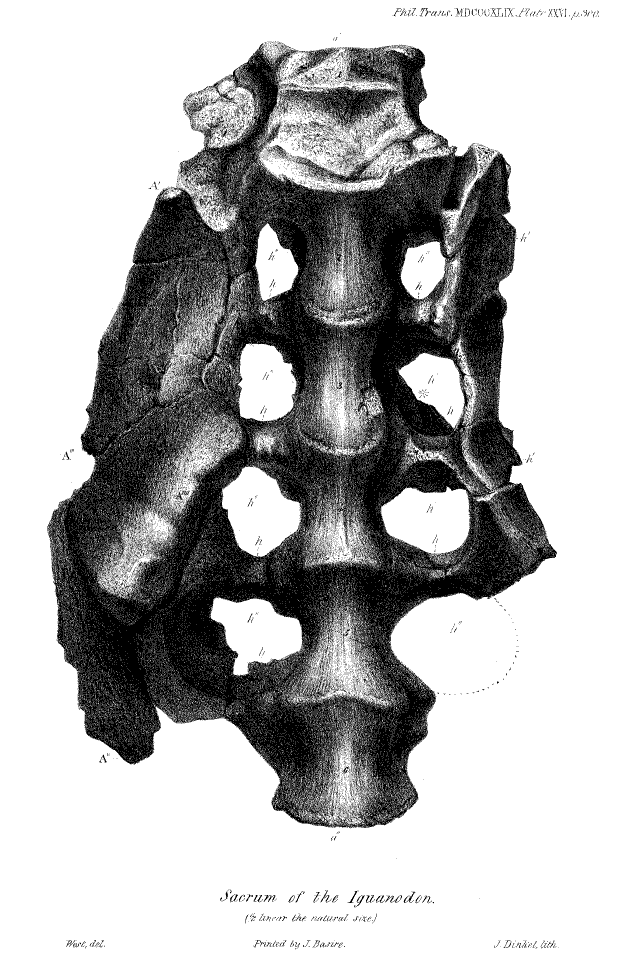
W. D. Saull's Iguanodon sacrum. In the scientific rivalry between Gideon Mantell and Richard Owen, Mantell borrowed the fossil from Saull and did more work developing it from its matrix, publishing detailed results to correct Owen's 1842 Report. Owen later wrote that the Dinosauria were largely based in their characters on this one specimen, now NHMUK PV OR 37685 (previously BMNH 37685) in the Natural History Museum.

[...] a private collection, which the proprietor liberally allows to be inspected on Thursdays, from 11 A.M. The Antiquities, principally excavated in the metropolis, consist of early British vases, Roman lamps and urns, amphora, and dishes, tiles, bricks, and pavements, and fragments of Samian ware; also, a few Egyptian antiquities: and a cabinet of Greek, Roman, and early British coins. The Geological Department contains the collection of the late Mr. Sowerby, with additions by Mr. Saull, F.G.S.; together exceeding 20,000 specimens, arranged according to the probable order of the earth's structure. Every article bears a descriptive label: and the localisation of the antiquities, some of which were dug up almost on the spot, renders these relics so many medals of our metropolitan civilisation.

Saull began to swap fossils with Gideon Mantell, a fellow collector, in 1830. In 1831 he purchased the geological collection of James Sowerby, previously on display in Lambeth; in 1833 he made it known that the weekly viewing time for his collection was open to working people, and in 1835 he rebuilt his museum.

Among Saull's exhibits was the sacrum of Iguanodon, mentioned by Richard Owen in one of his Reports on British Reptile Fossils. This specimen originated in the Isle of Wight, and is now in the Natural History Museum; the significance of the fused vertebrae with it came to Owen after his 1841 BAAS talk in Plymouth. It was a key step in postulating the Dinosauria. In fact Owen reviewed numerous specimens in 1842, of which those held by George Bax Holmes and Saull were the prominent examples in private hands; the sacrum has been called a "major factor" in erecting Dinosauria, and has been regarded as the first true dinosaur specimen.

== Activist ==
Saull's interests in radical causes were broad. He spoke at the "Optimist Chapel" of Pierre Henri Joseph Baume, around 1830. He was a backer of the unconventional ministries of Rev. Robert Taylor and Rev. Josiah Fitch of Stepney; and he also supported, with Julian Hibbert, Richard Carlile's lease of the Surrey Rotunda; he lectured himself at the Rotunda in 1832. He was nominated in 1832 to the National Political Union, a reformist group, by Henry Revell; George Jacob Holyoake relates that when Hibbert died, he had charged Baume with getting his head to Saull and his museum, for phrenological purposes.

Saull was close to the group around Robert Owen, serving on the council of the Owenite Equitable Labour Exchange, also in 1832; and he spoke in 1833 at an Owenite meeting in Charlotte Street, in favour of liberalisation of divorce. He addressed Owenites at Bristol in 1833 and put forth the theory of man's evolution from monkeys or apes, an idea he derived from Sir Humphry Davy. This "simian hypothesis" was inconsistent with the editorial line of The Crisis where it was published in October 1833, which came down against the antiquity of man and human speciation.

At the end of 1833 Saull was one of a group who employed William James Linton to fit out a room in City Road as a "Hall of Science", in which Rowland Detrosier was to lecture. The following year the Hall was active, controlled by James Watson, and Saull associated there with Watson, John Gast, and other "Finsbury group" radicals. When in the 1830s the government successfully prosecuted Henry Hetherington, who had evaded the stamp duty on newspapers, Saull acted as treasurer of a "Victim Fund" for those pursued for selling unstamped papers; the fund was an 1831 initiative of Hibbert and Saull with John Cleave and William Lovett, backed by the National Union of the Working Classes.

Saull joined a London Anti-Corn Law Association in 1836. In 1844, to support the faltering Owenite movement, he took a mortgage on the Rosehill (or Rose Hill) property that was part of one of its utopian schemes. This was part of a scheme of retrenchment implemented by William Pare, after the Harmony Hall estate in Hampshire had over-extended its finances, taking in Rosehill and another farm; Owen himself settled at Rosehill. He also supported the John Street Institution, a London centre for Chartism, by contributing to building costs.

== Member of learned societies ==
Saull was elected Fellow of the Geological Society in 1831, and Fellow of the Society of Antiquaries of London in 1841; he was also a Fellow of the Royal Astronomical Society., and a member of other societies, including the Société Géologique de France, and the London Phrenological Society. He was on the Council of the Ethnological Society of London in 1850.

== Death and legacy ==
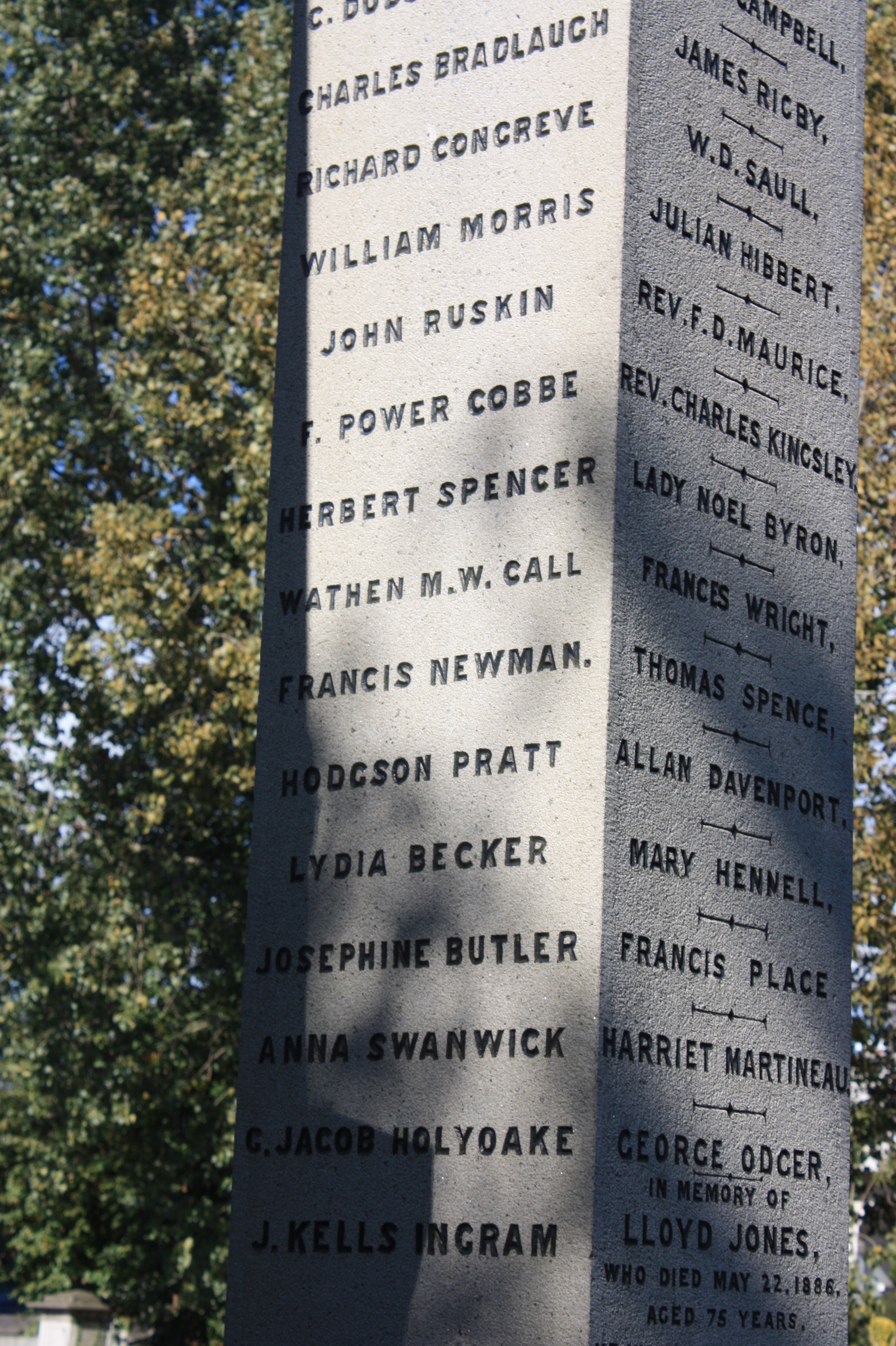
Saull's name on the lower section of the Reformers memorial, Kensal Green Cemetery

Saull died on 26 April 1855, and was buried in Kensal Green cemetery, near the graves of his radical friends Henry Hetherington and Allen Davenport. He had purchased a plot there in 1849, announced in The Reasoner for 12 September that year, shortly after Hetherington's death; the ground was unconsecrated. He is also listed on the Reformers Memorial near the entrance to Kensal Green Cemetery.

Saull's collections passed to the Metropolitan Institution, located in Cleveland Street, London, and managed by the trustees of his estate. They were never unpacked there, however. In the end the British Museum purchased around 200 objects, in 1863. The bulk of the collection was taken, questionably, by John Calvert. Cleveland Hall in Cleveland Street was built with a legacy from William Devonshire Saull, and in 1861 replaced the John Street Institution as the London center of freethought. The hall was controlled by its shareholders, and these changed over time, so it was not always used for freethought purposes. Eventually it was acquired by Hugh Price Hughes for his West London Methodist Mission.

== Works and views ==
Saull wrote a tract in the form of a letter to a local vicar (1828), arguing from comparative mythology. His interest in palaeontology was connected to his opposition to religious theories of creation; it has been said that "in Saull's case Deism was a mask for materialism". In writing to The Mechanics' Magazine edited by Sholto Percy in 1833, conveying the opening of his collection to visitors, he ended with the thought:

Education is the most important of sciences; and in practice we must necessarily divest our minds from every prejudice which has hitherto trammelled and prostrated the minds of youth.

Saull read papers to the Geological Society in 1849, and to the Society of Antiquaries in 1841, 1842, and 1844. His essays on coupled astronomical and geological phenomena (published in 1836 and 1853) contain his own very original opinions. Gideon Mantell defined Saull's topic in the 1853 version Essay on the Connexion between Astronomical and Geological Phenomena as "hypothetical causes of conditions and changes of temperature in former periods of the earth's history". Saull also republished, adding a preface, An Essay on the Astronomical and Physical Causes of Geological Changes, by Sir Richard Phillips, attacking the Newtonian theory of gravitation. It was answered by Sampson Arnold Mackey in a Lecture on Astronomy (1832). His scientific views were discussed at some length by William Floyd Karkeek, writing on The Geological History of the Horse in The Veterinarian in 1841. His stratigraphy was based on granite as fundamental, from which coral might generate spontaneously. He believed in evolution based on changing physical conditions on earth, over a very long timescale.

Subsequently, Saull took an interest in archaeology. His Notitia Britanniae appeared in 1845, a year in which he examined the London strata to about 20 feet deep, in an excavation in Cheapside, comparing pre-Roman dwellings to some he had seen in Yorkshire. He gave a paper at the Ethnological Society (15 March 1848) about the Roman fort on Wimbledon Common, in terms of a five-stage conjectural history of ancient Britons. In 1851 in Ipswich he addressed the BAAS on Ethnology and Archaeology of the Norse and Saxons, in reference to Britain; the paper was not published.
