= Pentrich rising =

1817 uprising in an English village

The Pentrich Rising was an armed uprising around the village of Pentrich, Derbyshire, England, on the night of 9–10 June 1817. While much of the planning took place in Pentrich, two of the three ringleaders were from South Wingfield and the other was from Sutton in Ashfield; it started from Hunt's Barn in South Wingfield, and the only person killed died in Wingfield Park.

A gathering of some two or three hundred men (stockingers, quarrymen and iron workers), led by Jeremiah Brandreth (The Nottingham Captain, an unemployed stockinger), set out from South Wingfield to march to Nottingham. They were lightly armed with pikes, scythes and a few guns, which had been hidden in a quarry in Wingfield Park, and had a set of rather unfocused revolutionary demands, including the wiping out of the National Debt.

One among them, William J. Oliver, was a government spy, and the uprising was quashed soon after it began. Three men were hanged and beheaded at Derby Gaol for their participation in the uprising: Brandreth, Isaac Ludlam and William Turner. Co-accused conspirator and leader George Weightman was sentenced to the same fate, but later had his sentence reduced to transportation for life, as a prisoner in the Australian penal colony.

== Historical background ==
Following the end of the Napoleonic Wars in 1815, a number of factors combined to drive the country into a severe depression. The increased industrialisation of the country, combined with the demobilisation of the forces, led to mass unemployment. The Corn Laws led to massive increases in the price of bread, while the repeal of income tax meant that the war debt had to be recovered by taxing commodities forcing their prices even higher. In addition, 1817 was unusually wet and cold, producing a very poor harvest.

The loss of production of war materials had affected engineering companies like the Butterley Company, the price of iron ore had slumped, and the production of coal had fallen by a third. The hosiery trade had also been falling away for about five years.

There was, in addition, a wider political picture. Since the previous century, there had been calls for parliamentary reform, particularly an end to the rotten boroughs. Subsequently there had been the French Revolution and the Reign of Terror and it appeared that any reform would be accompanied by violence, which Pitt's government set out to pre-empt by increasingly punitive measures.

== Prelude ==
Since 1811, there had been minor local uprisings, with stocking frames being smashed in protest at the employment of unskilled workers to produce low-quality stockings. Further afield, there had been food riots in many of the big cities.

Around the country there were a number of secret revolutionary committees. The one at Nottingham was headed by a needle maker, William Stevens, and its representative from Pentrich was a framework knitter called Thomas Bacon. Bacon was known to have revolutionary views, and was the originator of the Pentrich Hampden Club. Several meetings were held at Pentrich during which Bacon asserted that preparations for an uprising were well advanced, and he had made enquiries at the ironworks and elsewhere about procuring weaponry.

The decision to take action was made when news arrived of a revolutionary force heading from the north—a hoax fabricated by William Oliver, a paid informer under the Home Office's instruction. The aim was to join them to march on London in support of a bill by Sir Francis Burdett for parliamentary reform.

Bacon was suspected of machinery breaking and, with a warrant out for his arrest, had gone into hiding. He therefore appointed Jeremiah Brandreth, an unemployed stocking knitter with a wife and two children, to be his deputy. Opinion of Brandreth at the time seems to have been somewhat mixed, but he promised the men that they would go to Nottingham, invading Butterley ironworks on the way, where they would kill the three senior managers and ransack it for weapons. At Nottingham they would receive bread, beef and ale, and a sum of money, and they would take over the barracks. They would then proceed by boat down the River Trent and attack Newark. He told them that there were sixteen thousand ready to join them.

Among those present were Isaac Ludlam, a bankrupted farmer who owned a small quarry where he had built up a small cache of pikes, and William Turner an ex-soldier. The plan was to assemble at ten o'clock on 9 June, where Ludlam's pikes would be distributed and further weapons would be acquired by requisitioning a man and a gun from each house that they passed.

== The march ==
At 10 pm on 9 June, around fifty men assembled at Hunt's Barn in South Wingfield and for four hours ranged around the neighbourhood for weapons and extra men. At one house a widow, Mary Hepworth, lived with her two sons. When she refused to open up, the rioters broke a window and Brandreth fired a shot through it, killing a servant. Some of the party were appalled at this wanton act, but Brandreth threatened to shoot them also if they did not remain.

Eventually the group set out for the Butterley Company works. When they arrived they were confronted by George Goodwin, the factory agent, who, with a few constables, faced them down. One or two of the party defected and, increasingly demoralised, the remainder headed for Ripley.

There was no police force at that time. Order was maintained by the various semi-private armies such as the yeomanry, while intelligence was gathered by the Home Secretary, Lord Sidmouth, from a network formed of local magistrates and paid informers.

Through Ripley they pressed more followers into service and at Codnor and Langley Mill they awoke various publicans for beer, bread and cheese. It was now raining heavily and yet more men defected.

When the group crossed the River Erewash, they were in Nottinghamshire. At Giltbrook they were met by a small force of soldiers: twenty men of the 15th Regiment of Light Dragoons. The revolutionaries scattered and, while about forty were captured, the leaders managed to escape, to be arrested over the following months.

== Retribution ==
Altogether, eighty-five of the marchers were placed in Nottingham and Derby gaols, to be brought to trial at the County Hall in Derby, charged in the main of "maliciously and traitorously [endeavouring] ... by force of arms, to subvert and destroy the Government and the Constitution".

Twenty-three were sentenced, three to transportation for fourteen years and eleven for life. As for the ringleaders, the government was determined to make an example of them, hoping that "they could silence the demand for reform by executions for high treason".

Brandreth was apprehended at Bulwell on 22 July, while Isaac Ludlam was captured in Uttoxeter. Thomas Bacon and his brother John were caught in St.Ives, then in Huntingdonshire, as a result of a £100 reward. The trial was organised by William Lockett, the deputy Clerk of the Peace, who assembled "a group of 'respectable' jurors from the farming community on whom he could depend".

Initially, Bacon, Brandreth and George Weightman (Bacon's nephew) were to stand trial. However, Bacon knew of the part that William Oliver had played, which, had he revealed it, would have embarrassed the government and might have prejudiced the jury in favour of the defendants. Brandreth was therefore tried as the leader, with Turner, Ludlam and Weightman as accomplices. All four were convicted of high treason and sentenced to death. However, Weightman was reprieved due to a recommendation for leniency by the jury, and, with Bacon, was sentenced to transportation for life. Weightman was transported to the colonies, in his case Australia, and died in 1865, aged 68, in Kiama, New South Wales. He never returned to England to his wife and children. He was noted as a worthy and upstanding citizen. Josiah Godber another of the convicted men sent to Australia, also died in Sydney having established a good reputation. His letters to his wife in Ripley are considered of historical importance and kept in the National Library in the Australian Capital Territory, Australia.

Although the customary quartering was remitted by the Prince Regent, the three were publicly hanged and beheaded at Nuns Green in front of Friar Gate Gaol in Derby.

The episode brought no credit to the government and many liberal thinkers of the time were disgusted by the verdicts and the executions. Lord Sidmouth was especially much criticised for his use of Oliver as agent provocateur. Nevertheless, Lockett was able to say that the verdicts of the trial "were to have a salutary effect on the behaviour of the 'lower orders' in Pentrich and elsewhere".

There is little to be seen nowadays of the event, though the martyrs, together with Weightman are commemorated in Giltbrook street names. The hexagonal office, where Goodwin stood his ground, existed in the yard of the Butterley Company's works until it was demolished in 2009–10 along with the rest of the site, and the execution block can be seen by request in Derby Museum.

E. P. Thompson in The Making of the English Working Class sees this rising as a transitional event between the earlier Luddite actions and the later populist Radicalism of 1818–1820 and 1830–1832. (Note that Thompson refers to the village throughout as 'Pentridge', not the modern spelling.)
