= William Benbow =

English preacher, pamphleteer, pornographer and publisher

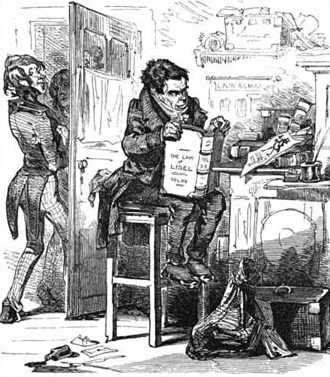
William Benbow caricatured in Punch magazine, 1848

William Benbow (1787 – 1864) was a nonconformist preacher, pamphleteer, pornographer and publisher, and a prominent figure of the Reform Movement in Manchester and London. He worked with William Cobbett on the radical newspaper Political Register, and spent time in prison as a consequence of his writing, publishing and campaigning activities. He has been credited with formulating and popularising the idea of a general strike for the purpose of political reform.

== Early life, religion and family ==
Benbow was born on 5 February 1787 in Middlewich, Cheshire, son of William Benbow, shoemaker, and his wife Hannah (née Chear). His early employment history is unknown, but McCalman describes him as an ex-soldier. By 1808 he was preaching Nonconformist sermons in the Newton area of Manchester, and evidence suggests he may have been a Quaker. He appears as "William Benbow, of Manchester, shoemaker" in a list of the leading reformers of Lancashire in 1816. When interviewed in Chester gaol in 1841, where he was serving a sentence for sedition, he described himself as a married shoemaker with three sons, and gave his religion as Baptist.

== Publishing and political activism ==
Benbow attended political meetings in London during 1816 as a delegate of one of the Lancashire Hampden Clubs, and became interested in Spenceanism. He was closely involved with planning the attempted Blanketeers protest march by Lancashire weavers in March 1817 and was one of a number of radicals arrested in the wake of this event and the subsequent severe crackdown by the authorities, amidst rumours that mass uprisings were being plotted in industrial centres like Manchester. His protest petition to Parliament in 1818, presented along with a number of others, describes how he was apprehended in Dublin on 16 May 1817, spent eight months on remand in London, then was released without trial, lacking the resources to travel home to Manchester. He established himself as a political radical in London, where he was an associate of William Cobbett and passed his time "agitating the labouring classes at their trades meetings and club-houses" according to the memoirs of the Manchester radical Samuel Bamford, who also spent several months in the Coldbath Fields Prison in London and petitioned Parliament unsuccessfully for redress.

To support himself and his radical activities, Benbow worked as a printer, publisher and bookseller, and also as a coffee house proprietor. In addition to political texts, he also produced pirated editions of other works, and pornography – around 1818 he employed the young William Dugdale who went on to become one of London's most notorious publishers of obscene and pornographic material. He was closely linked to the writer and publisher George Cannon, printing and marketing a number of his works and translations, and it has been suggested that some of the writings published under Benbow's name may have been written by Cannon. When William Cobbett fled to America in 1817 to avoid arrest, his radical newspaper, the Political Register, continued to be published in London by Benbow until his return in 1820.

In 1822 Benbow published an edition of Lord Byron's Don Juan, and also an edition of William Lawrence's controversial The Natural History of Man (1819), which had lost its copyright protection when deemed blasphemous by the Lord Chancellor. A heated exchange with the then Poet Laureate Robert Southey, who objected to Benbow's unauthorised reprinting of parts of his early poem Wat Tyler, prompted a response in the form of a pamphlet entitled A Scourge for the Laureate in which Benbow drew a pointed contrast between the radical sentiments of the early poem and Southey's later role within the establishment. Benbow printed his pirate edition of Southey's work under the imprint of his bookshop and publishing house, the Byron's Head, in Castle Street, Leicester Square. Among other works under this imprint was a pirated edition of Posthumous Poems of Percy Bysshe Shelley, which had been issued by Shelley's widow Mary in 1824 and swiftly withdrawn.

In 1832 he published Crimes of Clergy, a collection of his own articles highly critical of Church of England ministers. The articles had previously been published individually, and one, dated May 1821, gives its place of composition as King's Bench Prison. In early July 1821 Benbow's MP, John Cam Hobhouse, had raised the case of Benbow's imprisonment in Parliament, requesting the Attorney General to investigate the matter.

== The Grand National Holiday ==
On 28 January 1832 Benbow published a pamphlet entitled Grand National Holiday and Congress of the Productive Classes. He had joined the National Union of the Working Classes in 1831, and his coffee house and beer shop at 8 Theobalds Road, otherwise known as the Institution of the Working Classes, became the focus for the Union's activities. Benbow was a regular, high-profile speaker at its gatherings at Blackfriars Rotunda, where he advocated direct and even violent action for political reform, and in particular his idea for a "national holiday" and "national convention". By this he meant an extended period of general strike by the working classes, which would be a sacred or holy action (hence "holy-day"), during which time local committees would keep the peace and elect delegates to a national convention or congress, which would agree the future direction of the nation. In his pamphlet Benbow drew parallels between his plan and the ancient Jewish Jubilee year, which embraced concepts like forgiveness of debt and redistribution of land. The striking workers were to support themselves with savings and confiscated parish funds, and by demanding contributions from rich people. Benbow briefly edited published a newspaper, the Tribune of the People, whose subject-matter was the topics to be included in the congress, but it was discontinued after just three issues. In April 1832 he was arrested again, along with James Watson and William Lovett, for his involvement in planning a Chartist parade and "general feast" He was tried and acquitted the following month.

Benbow's popularity waned for a time after the passage of the Reform Bill, but his idea of a Grand National Holiday or "sacred month" was adopted by the Chartist Congress of 1839, Benbow having spent time in Manchester during 1838–9 promoting the cause and his pamphlet. The month was scheduled to begin on 12 August, but on 4 August Benbow was arrested for seditious libel along with George Julian Harney, for campaigning to persuade workers to participate. The Chartists called off the strike. Benbow spent eight months on remand. At his trial, in Chester in April 1840, he spoke for over ten hours in his own defence, but was convicted and sentenced to sixteen months imprisonment. William Benbow, his wife and son George emigrated to Australia around 1853. He died in Sydney on 24 February 1864.

== See also ==
- Rotunda radicals
- Blanketeers
