= Jeremiah Brandreth =

British rebel executed for treason (died 1817)

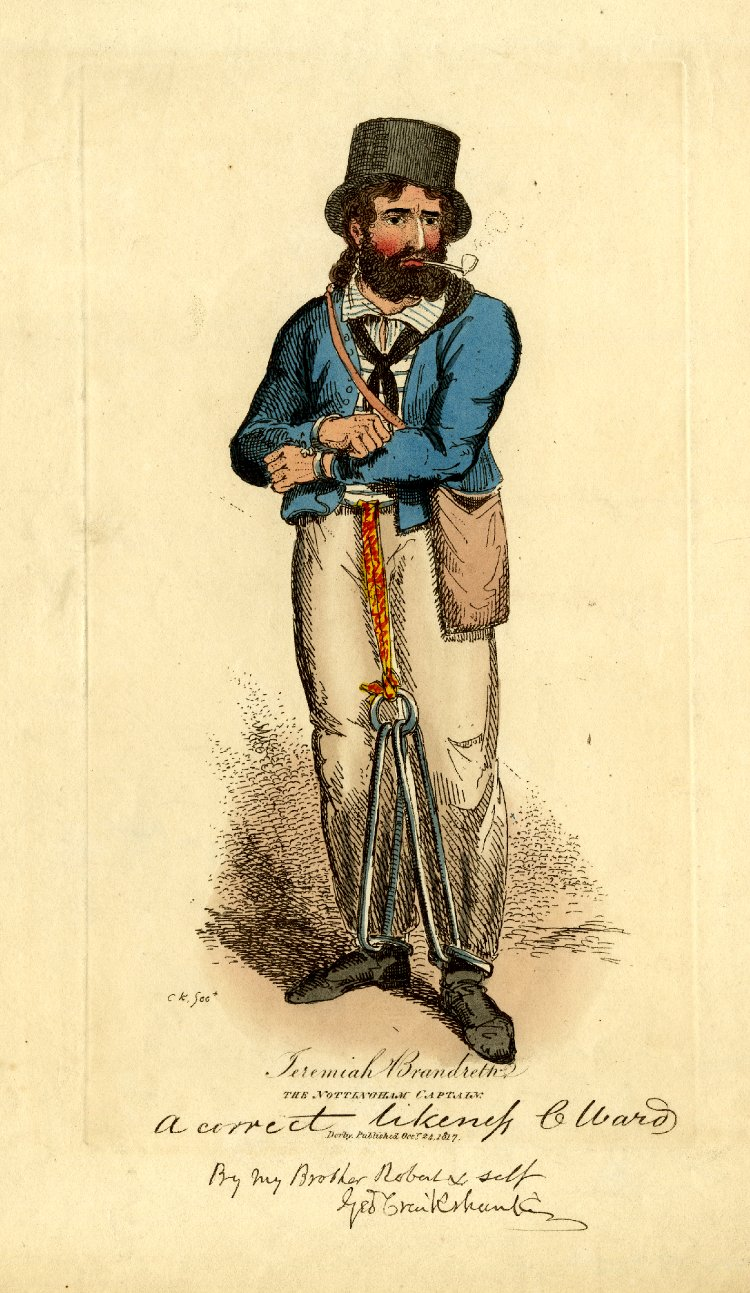
- A hand coloured etching of Jeremiah Brandreth
- Born: 1785; Wilford, Nottingham, Nottinghamshire
- Died: 7 November 1817 (aged 31–32); Derby, Derbyshire
- Occupation: Stocking maker
- Spouse(s): Ann Bridget, Sutton-in-Ashfield, 29 September 1811
- Children: 3
- Parent(s): Timothy Brandreth and Mary Smollett

Jeremiah Brandreth (1785 – 7 November 1817) was an out-of-work stocking maker, living in Sutton-in-Ashfield, Nottinghamshire, who was executed for treason after being convicted of plotting to overthrow the Government of the United Kingdom. He and two others, who were known as the Pentrich martyrs, were the last people to be beheaded by an axe (posthumously, after being hanged) in an execution in Britain.

== Early life ==
Brandreth, who became known as "The Nottingham Captain", was born in Wilford, Nottingham. Brandreth became a stockinger by trade. He married Ann Bridget at Sutton on 29 September 1811. He later moved to Sutton-in-Ashfield where he lived with his wife and three children.

It is believed that Brandreth was involved in Luddite activities in 1811. He was involved in a Luddite raid in 1811 when a fellow Luddite was shot dead.

Writer and broadcaster Gyles Brandreth has stated he is a descendant of Jeremiah Brandreth.

== Rebellious plot ==
Brandreth met William J. Oliver (later known as "Oliver the Spy") in May 1817 and agreed to cooperate in a plan in which he would join 50,000 men in London to storm the Tower. It is widely believed that Brandreth was a victim of the Home Secretary, Lord Sidmouth, who took severe measures against Luddite rioters.

The "revolution" began on 9 June 1817. Brandreth had held a final meeting at a pub in Pentridge, or Pentrich, The White Horse, where he and his fellow conspirators were to lead a march on Nottingham where "they would receive 100 guineas, bread, meat and ale." They would then lead an attack on the local barracks, overthrow the government and end "poverty for ever". They were lightly armed with pikes, scythes and a few guns and only had a set of rather unfocused revolutionary demands, including the wiping out of the National Debt.

At 10 pm on 9 June, around 50 men assembled at Hunt's Barn in South Wingfield and for four hours ranged around the neighbourhood for weapons and extra men. At one house a widow, Mary Hepworth, lived with her two sons. When she refused to open up, the rioters broke a window and Brandreth fired a shot through it, killing a servant. Some of the party were appalled at this act but Brandreth threatened to shoot anyone who tried to leave.

Eventually the group set out for the works of the Butterley Company outside Ripley, Derbyshire. When they arrived they were confronted by George Goodwin, the factory agent, who was with a few constables. After a stand off, several of the rebel party left. Increasingly demoralised Brandreth and the remainder headed into the town where they forced some of the townsfolk to join them. The rebels continued their march through Codnor and Langley Mill where they awoke publicans for beer, bread and cheese. When it started to rain heavily, more men slipped away.

Outside the village of Giltbrook they were met by 20 mounted troops from the 15th Regiment of Light Dragoons. The appearance of regulars prompted the revolutionaries to scatter. While forty men were captured at the scene, Brandreth and some of the other leaders managed to escape only to be arrested in the next few months.

== Trial and execution ==
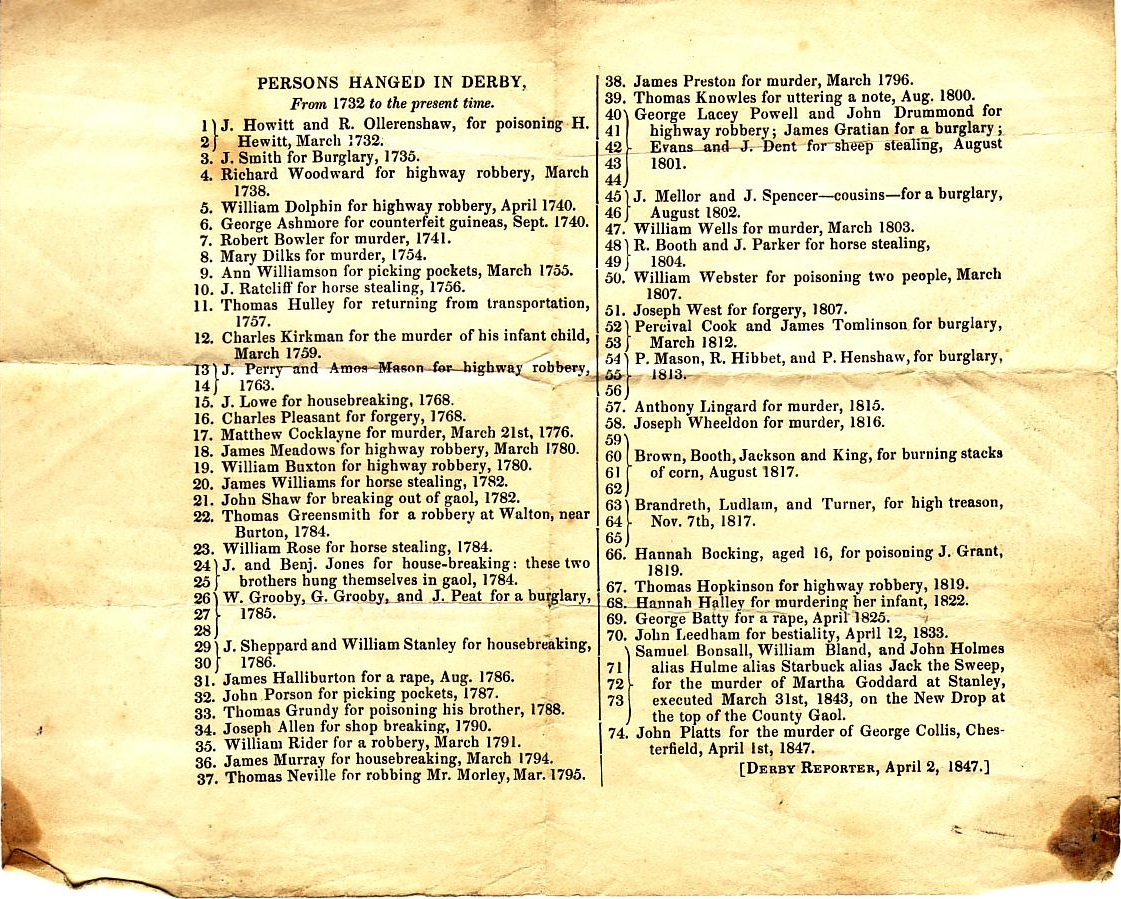
List of public hangings for Derby

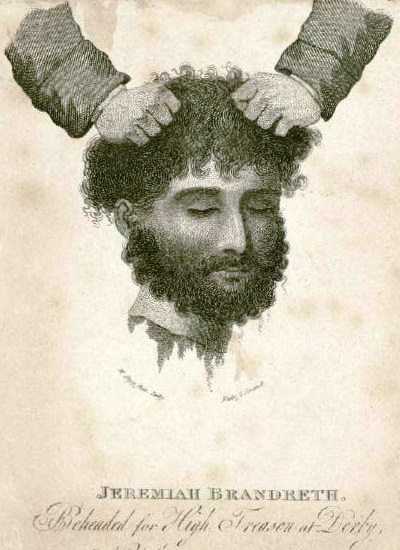
Contemporary etching of the head of the executed Jeremiah Brandreth

A total of 35 people were brought to trial at the Old Bailey in London for their role in the Pentrich rising. Brandreth and two others, William Turner and Isaac Ludlam, were convicted of high treason and sentenced to execution by being hanged, drawn and quartered. The drawing and quartering (i.e. the disembowelling of the living condemned person and subsequent dismemberment) was commuted by George, the Prince Regent. Brandreth's execution took place with the others outside Derby Gaol on 7 November 1817. Once they were dead the three men's heads were cut off with an axe. When Brandreth's head was shown to the crowd and they did not cheer the death of a traitor, the cavalry prepared to charge at the first sign of trouble. The board used to hold the bodies during beheading is kept in Derby Museum.

On the scaffold one of the men claimed that they had been set up by Lord Sidmouth and "Oliver the spy". The claim was investigated by Edward Baines of the Leeds Mercury who found sufficient evidence to justify publishing the story.

During the trial and subsequent execution, Brandreth's family were removed to his birthplace, Wilford, where they were cared for by John Hazard, Overseer of the Township of Wilford.
