= Blanketeers =

1817 protest march in Manchester, England

The Blanketeers or Blanket March was a demonstration organised in Manchester in March 1817. The intention was for the participants, who were mainly Lancashire weavers, to march to London and petition the Prince Regent over the desperate state of the textile industry in Lancashire, and to protest over the recent suspension of the Habeas Corpus Act. The march was broken up violently and its leaders imprisoned. The Blanketeers formed part of a series of protests and calls for reform that culminated in 1819 with the Peterloo Massacre and the Six Acts.

== Background ==
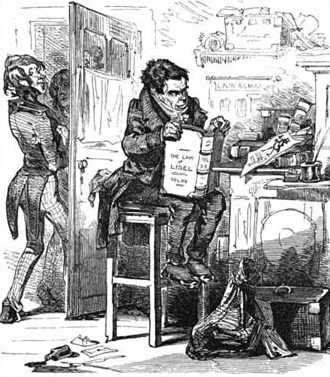
William Benbow (pictured in Punch in 1848) announced the march at a public meeting.

England suffered economic hardship in the years immediately following the Napoleonic Wars, and Lord Liverpool's government faced growing demands for social, political and economic reform. In the textile towns of the industrial north, wages fell sharply as the factory system developed, and traditional handloom weavers were among the worst affected. The Corn Laws of 1815 onward were intended to protect British agricultural landowners from cheap foreign imports, but their effect was to increase grain prices and decrease supplies, causing hardship among the poor. In 1816 (the "Year Without a Summer") severe weather resulted in poor harvests, leading to further food shortages during the winter of 1816–1817. Discontent led to riots, first in some country districts and then in towns and cities, notably the London Spa Fields riots of November–December 1816. A Reform Bill for universal suffrage was drafted, with considerable input from the Northern radicals, and presented to Parliament at the end of January by Thomas Cochrane, but it was rejected on procedural grounds by the House of Commons. After the Prince Regent's coach was attacked on the way back from Parliament on 28 January 1817, the government embarked on the so-called "Gag Acts", a number of measures to repress the radicals, including the suspension of the Habeas Corpus Act. The rejection of the draft bill, and the increasingly repressive measure, led to a series of events that included the Blanketeers' march, as the radicals attempted, as Poole puts it: "to appeal in the last resort to the crown over the head of parliament, and to exercise in person the right of petitioning which had been denied them by proxy".

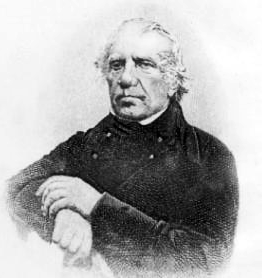
Samuel Bamford opposed the march, but was arrested in the aftermath

In January and February 1817, various workers' and deputies' meetings in Manchester were addressed by the radical orators Samuel Drummond and John Bagguley. A recurring theme of these meetings was the supposed legal right of individuals to address petitions directly to the Crown. Drummond and Bagguley helped plan a march to London to present such a petition, holding meetings along the way and encouraging others to join the demonstration, and these plans were announced by William Benbow at a public meeting in Manchester on 3 March, at which the hope was expressed that the marchers would be 20,000 strong.

Some Lancashire reformers opposed the march and advised their supporters not to take part. Samuel Bamford, a weaver, writer and radical leader from Middleton, had been part of the delegation to London to discuss and forward the abortive Reform Bill. He thought the march ill-planned and unwise, predicting that they would be "denounced as robbers and rebels and the military would be brought to cut them down or take them prisoners", and expressed his relief that no Middleton people went as marchers. Bamford would later claim that one of the organisers disappeared with the money raised to feed the Blanketeers, leaving them without a means of support on the march.

== Assembly and march ==
On 10 March 1817 around 5,000 marchers, mainly spinners and weavers, met in St. Peter's Field, near Manchester, along with a large crowd of onlookers, perhaps as many as 25,000 people in total. Each marcher had a blanket or rolled overcoat on his back, to sleep under at night and to serve as a sign that the man was a textile worker, giving the march its eventual nickname. The plan was for the marchers to walk in separate groups of ten, to avoid any accusation of illegal mass assembly. Each group of ten carried a petition bearing twenty names, appealing directly to the Prince Regent to take urgent steps to improve the Lancashire cotton trade. The organisers stressed the importance of lawful behaviour during the march, and Drummond was quoted as declaring: "We will let them see it is not riot and disturbance we want, it is bread we want and we will apply to our noble Prince as a child would to its Father for bread." Nevertheless, magistrates had the Riot Act read, the meeting was broken up by the King's Dragoon Guards, and 27 people were arrested including Bagguley and Drummond. Plans for the march were thus in confusion, but several hundred men set off. The cavalry pursued and attacked them, in Ardwick on the outskirts of Manchester and elsewhere, including an incident at Stockport that left several marchers with sabre wounds and one local resident shot dead. Many dropped out or were taken into custody by police and the yeomanry between Manchester and Stockport, and the majority were turned back or arrested under vagrancy laws before they reached Derbyshire. There were unconfirmed stories that just one marcher, variously named as "Abel Couldwell" or "Jonathan Cowgill", reached London and handed over his petition.

== "Ardwick Bridge conspiracy" and aftermath ==
Some concern was expressed over the harsh suppression of the march, but the Manchester magistrates quickly provided justification for the authorities' actions. On 28 March a private meeting of reformers was broken up in the Ardwick Bridge area of Manchester, and the following day it was announced that a major conspiracy had been discovered. According to the official story, deputies in Manchester and other northern towns had been planning an uprising in which the army and local officials would be attacked, mills burned, and imprisoned Blanketeers liberated. It was said that up to fifty thousand people were expected to take part. Many suspected insurrectionists were arrested immediately, including Samuel Bamford, whose memoirs contain a detailed description of his arrest and detention. The prisoners were taken to London in irons for personal interrogation by a secret tribunal including the Foreign Secretary, Lord Castlereagh and the Home Secretary, Lord Sidmouth. In some cases they were held without trial for months before their eventual release. No sign of the uprising was seen on the appointed day, but the event was used to support the government's case for the continued emergency measures. Parliament renewed the suspension of Habeas Corpus again in June and it was not reinstated until the following March, at which time legislation indemnifying officials for any unlawful actions during the period of suspension was also passed. Meanwhile, the Pentridge or Pentrich Rising in Derbyshire in June 1817 continued the trend of insurrection among the working classes in the name of social and political reform.

The government also clamped down on press comment and radical writing. It had already passed the Power of Imprisonment Bill in February 1817, prompting the journalist William Cobbett to leave for America for fear of arrest for his pro-reform writing and publishing, and the Seditious Meetings Act in March of that year, as a direct response to the Blanketeers' march. On 12 May Sidmouth circulated instructions to the Lords Lieutenant that magistrates could use their own judgement on what constituted "seditious or blasphemous libel" and could arrest and bail anyone caught selling it. The Six Acts, which followed the Peterloo massacre, would include further restrictions designed to limit the freedom of the press.

The Blanketeers March and the subsequent conspiracy alarms led the Manchester magistrates to form the short-lived Manchester and Salford Yeomanry cavalry, intended to combat any future attempts at insurrection. It became infamous two years later for its role in the Peterloo Massacre.
