= St Matthew's Church, Pentrich =

St Matthew’s Church, Pentrich
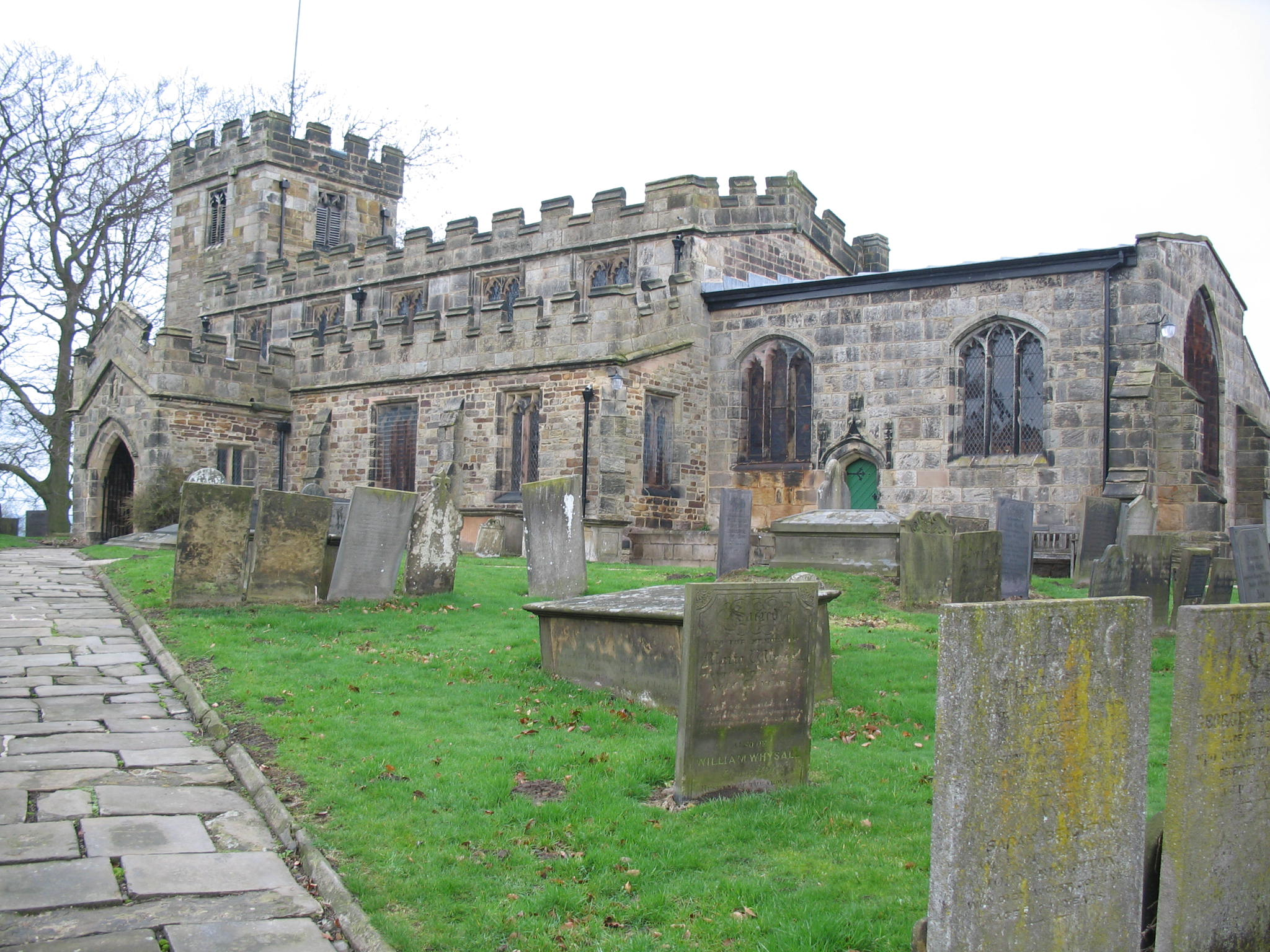
- St Matthew’s Church, Pentrich (photograph by Revcarole)
- St Matthew’s Church, Pentrich
- Location: Pentrich
- Country: England
- Denomination: Church of England

History
- Dedication: St Matthew

Architecture
- Heritage designation: Grade I listed

Administration
- Diocese: Diocese of Derby
- Archdeaconry: Chesterfield
- Deanery: Alfreton
- Parish: Pentrich

St Matthew's Church is a Grade I listed parish church in the Church of England in Pentrich, Derbyshire.

== History ==
The church dates from the 12th century. It comprises a nave, north and south aisles, a porch, chancel and short embattled tower. It was restored between 1859 and 1860. It reopened on 28 March 1860.

The font stands on a pedestal dated 1662 but the bowl has decoration typical of the Norman period. During the 19th century the bowl was absent and was used for the salting of beef.

On the exterior of the south chancel wall is a scratch dial or mass clock.

== Stained glass ==
- South aisle east end, Morris & Co.
- Chancel north wall. Christopher Whall 1915

== Memorials ==
- Edward Horn (d. 1764)
- Madam Mower (d. 1776)

== Organ ==
The pipe organ dates from 1860 and was built by Forster and Andrews. A specification of the organ can be found on the National Pipe Organ Register.

== See also ==
- Grade I listed churches in Derbyshire
- Grade I listed buildings in Derbyshire
- Listed buildings in Pentrich
