= Eliza Sharples =

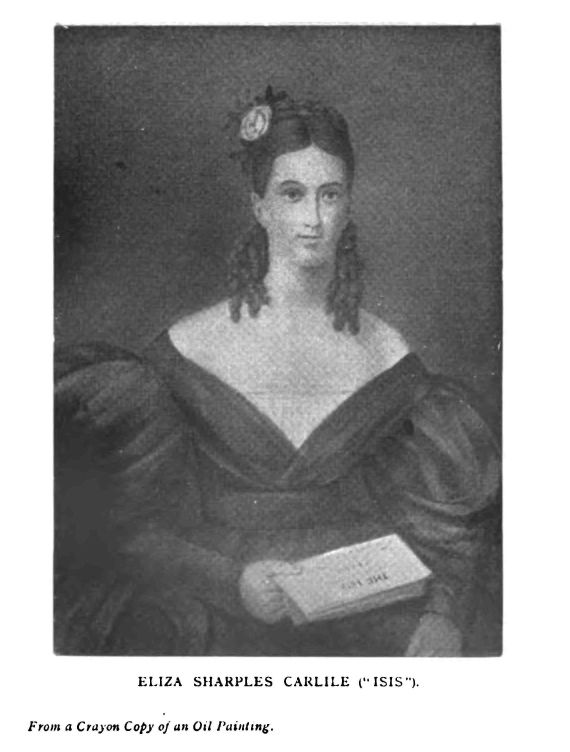
- Born: 1803; Bolton, Lancashire, England
- Died: 11 January 1852 (aged 48–49); Hackney, London, England
- Occupations: Lecturer, writer, newspaper editor

Eliza Sharples (1803–1852) was one of the first women in England to lecture on freethought, radical politics and women's rights. Using the names the Lady of the Rotunda and Isis, she delivered her lectures at the Blackfriars Rotunda in 1832, while it was under the management of her partner, Richard Carlile. Her speeches, together with writings by Carlile, herself and others, appeared in her weekly journal, The Isis.

== Early life ==
Sharples was born in 1803 in Bolton, Lancashire to Ann and Richard Sharples, a prosperous manufacturer of counterpanes. Her family were Wesleyan Methodists and her upbringing, both at home and at boarding school, instilled her with strong religious commitment.

She attended boarding school until she was twenty years old, after which she remained at home, sewing and reading. The sudden deaths of her father, brother and sister, and the failure of prayer to save their lives, caused Sharples to question her faith, resulting in a radical change in her life.

In 1829, while visiting a friend in Liverpool, Sharples had eavesdropped on a discussion between her friend's father and Richard Carlile. In spite of Carlile's reputation as a dangerous atheist and political radical Sharples thought he was mild-mannered and handsome. About a year later she discovered a copy of Carlile's newspaper The Republican in a cousin's library and became interested enough to track down more of his works in a local radical bookshop. Carlile's writings transformed Sharples' beliefs and led to what she later described as a "new birth…unto righteousness". In December 1831 she began to correspond with Carlile, who by now had been imprisoned for seditious libel, and in January 1832 she travelled to London to visit him in Giltspur Street Compter.

== The Lady of the Rotunda and Isis ==
Sharples' arrival gave Carlile an opportunity to revive the fortunes of his radical theatre, the Rotunda, which had fallen on hard times since the imprisonment of its chief attraction, Robert Taylor and the departure of his successor, Zion Ward. She agreed to take the places of Taylor and Ward, and deliver a series of philosophical and religious free thought lectures at the Rotunda.

In order to protect her family, Sharples did not want her name to be made public, so Carlile promoted her as the mysterious "Lady of the Rotunda" or "Isis" (named after the Egyptian Goddess of Reason), the first Englishwoman to speak in public about religion and politics.

Her lectures, which commenced on 29 January 1832, were staged theatrically. Wearing a "showy" dress, she was led ceremoniously on to the stage, which was strewn with radical symbols, such as whitethorn and laurel leaves. After her lecture she left the stage without taking questions from the audience, who then debated its content amongst themselves. Her speeches were printed in a weekly journal, The Isis, which she edited.

In the tradition of Carlile and Taylor, Sharples attacked the monarchy, the political establishment and organised religion, arguing that Christianity promoted superstition, prevented the dissemination of knowledge and denied man's liberty. In addition, she spoke in favour of women's rights to speak in public and challenged the Christian doctrine of original sin, proclaiming Eve to be "the personification of wisdom, of liberty, of resistance to tyranny; the mother of human knowledge; the proper help meet for man".

Initially, Sharples achieved cult status, but her lack of training in public speaking soon led to a decline in income from audiences, and by the end of March Carlile had closed the Rotunda and given up its lease. Sharples continued her lectures for a further three months, firstly at Robert Owen's theatre in Burton Street, then at Carlile's house in Bouverie Street. She then worked closely with the Friends of the Oppressed, who were the female arm of the National Union of the Working Classes, giving speeches in celebration of the 1830 French Revolution and to raise funds for the families of those imprisoned for selling unstamped newspapers. Although she was not a follower of Robert Owen, she also gave a speech on the importance of co-operation, where she described herself as "a radical reformer, a republican, an advocate for free discussion on all subjects, and a co-operator, in the best sense in which I have known that word to be used".

The Isis ceased publication in December 1832, after which Sharples lowered her public profile.

== A moral marriage ==
The relationship between Sharples and Carlile was physical as well as intellectual, and the first of their four children, Richard, was born in April 1833, while Carlile was still in prison. Carlile and his wife, Jane, had separated in 1830, but could not afford divorce proceedings. After meeting Sharples, Carlile gave Jane an annuity, she and her children moved out of Carlile's house and Sharples moved in, to be joined by Carlile when he was released in August 1833.

During her pregnancy Sharples asked Carlile to publicly acknowledge their relationship. Initially he prevaricated for fear of damaging his reputation, but in September 1833 he published a statement that his "moral marriage" was "one of the best, if not the very best in the country". In her Preface to the folio edition of The Isis, published in 1834, Sharples gave her full name as Eliza Sharples Carlile and defended the morality of their relationship. However, fellow radicals, such as Henry Hetherington, publicly condemned Carlile for leaving his wife, while Sharples' family disowned both her and her children.

After his release from prison, Carlile resumed giving public lectures, both in London and elsewhere. Sharples accompanied him on his first provincial tour but returned to London in October 1833, following their son's death from smallpox. A second son, Julian Hibbert, was born in 1834, after which they moved to a cottage in Enfield Highway, where two daughters were born, Hypatia (1836) and Theophila (1837). Carlile continued to tour the country and Sharples would occasionally lecture in his place if he was ill. For much of the time she remained at home with the children.

== Final years ==
When Carlile died on 10 February 1843 leaving no will, his property went to his wife, and Sharples was left destitute. Sophia Chichester, a former patron of Carlile, arranged for her to live in a utopian community at Alcott House, Ham. She left after a few months and, with the aid of a small legacy from an aunt, took a house in London, where she supported herself and the children by needlework and letting rooms.

During her last years, Sharples lived in poverty and the struggle to look after her family affected her health and motivation. Her public appearances were limited to a lecture in 1846 "on the Nature and Character of Woman and her Position in Society" and a brief speech on the birthday anniversary of Thomas Paine in 1849, both given at the Owenite Literary and Social Institution. In 1849, some supporters of Carlile invited her to manage their Temperance Hall in Warner Place, near Hackney Road. There she met the teenage Charles Bradlaugh, future founder of the National Secular Society and took him in when his family ejected him from their home. She wanted to give a series of lectures on women's rights, but this was vetoed by the men who ran the Temperance Hall. She wrote that they regarded her job as serving the coffee and scorned her belief that "all Reform will be found to be inefficient that does not embrace the Rights of Women".

Sharples died at her home in 12 George Street, Hackney, London, on 11 January 1852.

== Selected publications ==
- A glossary for the Bible: chiefly designed for children by Eliza Sharples Carlile, 1832
