= Listed buildings in Pentrich =

Pentrich is a civil parish in the Amber Valley district of Derbyshire, England. The parish contains eight listed buildings that are recorded in the National Heritage List for England. Of these, one is listed at Grade I, the highest of the three grades, and the others are at Grade II, the lowest grade. The parish contains the village of Pentrich and the surrounding countryside, and the listed buildings consist of four farmhouses, two mileposts, a church and a railway signal box.

== Key ==
Grade	Criteria
I	Buildings of exceptional interest, sometimes considered to be internationally important
II	Buildings of national importance and special interest

== Buildings ==
Name and location	Photograph	Date	Notes	Grade
St Matthew's Church; 53.06902°N 1.42020°W		12th century	The church has been altered and extended through the centuries, and was restored in 1859. It is built in sandstone with gritstone dressings, and a lead roof. The church consists of a nave with a clerestory, north and south aisles, a south porch, a chancel with a north vestry, and a west tower. The tower has three stages, angle buttresses, two-light Perpendicular bell openings with ogee heads, and an embattled parapet. The nave, aisles and porch also have embattled parapets, and the east window has five lights under a depressed pointed arch.	I
Amberley Farmhouse; 53.07351°N 1.43455°W		Mid 18th century	The farmhouse is in sandstone on a massive plinth, and has a slate roof with coped gables. There is an L-shaped plan, with a front range of three storeys and two bays, a rear wing, and a single-storey extension on the left. The central doorway has a quoined surround, a massive lintel and a shallow bracketed hood. The windows are mullioned with three lights, and contain sashes in the lower two floors, and casements in the top floor.	II
Coneygrey Farmhouse; 53.08050°N 1.42550°W		Mid 18th century	The farmhouse is in sandstone on a shallow plinth, with chamfered quoins, a moulded eaves cornice, and a slate roof with coped gables. There are two storeys, a main block with three bays, and a lower two-bay wing with a hipped roof to the right. The central doorway has a Gibbs surround, a rectangular fanlight, and a moulded cornice. The windows on the front are 20th-century replacements, and on the rear are a three-stage staircase window, a two-light mullioned window, and a blocked doorway with a quoined surround.	II
Amberside Farmhouse; 53.06431°N 1.43820°W		Early 19th century	The farmhouse is in sandstone on a shallow plinth, with chamfered quoins, and a hipped roof with overhanging eaves. There is a main range with three storeys and three bays, and parallel rear ranges with two storeys. The central doorway has a rectangular fanlight and a moulded cornice. The windows are sashes, those in the ground floor are tripartite, and in the lower two floors they have moulded cornices.	II
Asherfields; 53.06657°N 1.41114°W	—	Early 19th century	A farmhouse in sandstone on a shallow plinth with a hipped roof and overhanging eaves. There are two storeys and three bays. In the centre is a gabled trellis-work porch with decorative bargeboards and a doorway with a rectangular fanlight, and the windows are sashes.	II
Milepost (north); 53.07656°N 1.43063°W	—	Mid 19th century	The milepost is on the northwest side of the B6013 road, and is in cast iron. It has a triangular plan, and a dished upper face inscribed with the name of the parish and the manufacturer. On the sides are the distances to Derby, Clay Cross, Chesterfield, Dronfield and Sheffield.	II
Milepost (south); 53.06304°N 1.43814°W		Mid 19th century	The milepost is on the west side of the B6013 road, and is in cast iron. It has a triangular plan, and a dished upper face inscribed with the name of the parish and the manufacturer. On the sides are the distances to Derby, Clay Cross, Chesterfield, Dronfield and Sheffield.	II
Signal Box; 53.06313°N 1.40701°W		c. 1865	The signal box, which was built by the Midland Railway, has an iron frame clad in wood, and a slate roof with spike finials. It is cantilevered on both sides, and has a balcony and glazing all round it. The signal box was moved to its present site in 1984.	II
