= Rotunda radicals =

The Rotunda radicals, known at the time as Rotundists or Rotundanists, were a diverse group of social, political and religious radical reformers who gathered around the Blackfriars Rotunda, London, between 1830 and 1832, while it was under the management of Richard Carlile. During this period almost every well-known radical in London spoke there at meetings which were often rowdy. The Home Office regarded the Rotunda as a centre of violence, sedition and blasphemy, and regularly spied on its meetings.

== Carlile's occupancy ==
When Carlile took over its lease in May 1830 the building was in a poor state of repair. He announced that the Rotunda would regain the prestige it had in its days as the Surrey Institution, where Samuel Taylor Coleridge and William Hazlitt had spoken, and would become a forum of free speech against political and religious despotism. Using money from wealthy radical patrons such as William Devonshire Saull and Julian Hibbert, he spent £1300 on refurbishments and offered its two auditoriums for hire by radical groups and speakers.

== The Devil's Chaplain ==
During Carlile's first year at the Rotunda, the most popular attraction was Robert Taylor, a former Anglican cleric, turned infidel. Dressed in ecclesiastical clothes, in a room decorated with the signs of the zodiac, Taylor gave theatrical sermons which mocked the rituals of the established church and claimed that Christianity was based on astrological allegory. He was nicknamed the "Devil's Chaplain" and, in one of his most dramatic performances, he used stage props and lighting to "raise" the Devil, who would then be transformed into an "angel of light". Taylor continued to deliver sermons, as well as political melodramas and satires, until July 1831, when he was imprisoned for blasphemous libel.

== Political reform groups ==
=== Radical Reform Association and Metropolitan Political Union ===
Carlile's occupancy of the Rotunda coincided with a period of intense political agitation, which preceded the passing of the Reform Act 1832 (2 & 3 Will. 4. c. 45). Although he was a republican, influenced by Thomas Paine, Carlile was more interested in religious than parliamentary reform. However, in July 1830 he rented out the Rotunda to two political reform groups: the Radical Reform Association (RRA) and the Metropolitan Political Union (MPU).

The RRA campaigned for universal manhood suffrage, annual parliaments and elections by ballot. Its leader was Henry Hunt and members included Henry Hetherington, John Cleave, William Lovett, James Watson and James Bronterre O'Brien. The MPU was a more moderate organisation which sought an alliance between middle and working-class radicals to achieve parliamentary reform. Its members included the MPs Daniel O'Connell and Joseph Hume, as well as Hunt and others from the RRA. The alliance was short lived. Following an MPU meeting at the Rotunda in support of the French July Revolution, several of its leaders claimed that Hetherington, Lovett and others had made seditious speeches and refused to work with them. The MPU lost momentum and soon folded.

In the autumn of 1830, following a general election, the Prime Minister, the Duke of Wellington, declared his complete opposition to parliamentary reform. RRA meetings became crowded and volatile, with tricolour flags on display. In early November, after Hunt and others had addressed a crowd of 2000, with several thousand more outside, 1500 people marched towards the House of Commons but were dispersed following clashes with the police. Fearing a repetition of such events, the police advised King William IV to cancel a visit to the City of London, planned for the following day.

Wellington resigned a few days later, but the RRA did not survive for much longer. Hunt tried to distance himself from the demonstration and tempers became frayed when he objected to a tricolour and accused Carlile of being a police spy. This caused a split in the RRA and the group was unable to continue after Carlile doubled the cost of their room hire.

Other Rotunda speakers at this time included William Cobbett, who gave a series of lectures on the July Revolution, John Gale Jones and Carlile himself, who reviewed parliamentary speeches and expressed sympathy for the Swing Riots. In January 1831 Carlile's support for the rioters led to him being prosecuted for seditious libel and imprisoned for over two years, and for the next few months Taylor's performances provided almost all of the Rotunda's income.

=== National Union of the Working Classes ===
When Taylor was imprisoned in July 1831, Carlile's financial situation became desperate. Setting aside his differences with the radical political groups, he allowed a new organisation, the National Union of the Working Classes (NUWC), to use the Rotunda free of charge in return for all the entry proceeds. Many of the NUWC's leaders, including Lovett, Hetherington, Watson and Cleave, had been active in both the RRA and the Owenite British Association for the Promotion of Co-operative Knowledge (BAPCK). The NUWC combined the RRA's campaign for universal suffrage, ballots and annual parliaments with the BAPCK's support for the unstamped press, as well as other radical causes, such as such as abolition of parish tithes.

The Reform Bill, which had been proposed by the Whigs in March 1831, divided the NUWC and other radical opinion. Although it denied the vote to working-class people, many Rotunda radicals, including Carlile and Cobbett, supported it as a stepping stone to full democracy. Others, such as Hunt and Hetherington, argued that its rejection was the only way to achieve more radical reform.

Whatever its divisions, the NUWC united in condemning the House of Lords, which had rejected the Bill in October. Rotunda meetings became more violent in tone, and some of its more extreme members, such as William Benbow, advocated arming the people and calling a general strike. Middle-class reformers, including Francis Place, feared that the militancy of the NUWC would prompt the government into watering-down the Bill. They set up a rival organisation, the National Political Union (NPU), with the aim of winning moderate working-class support for the Bill. Place ensured that the NPU council was dominated by "respectable working men untainted with the Rotunda heresy" and attempts at NPU meetings to advocate universal suffrage were shouted down. This strategy had some success and the NUWC lost members to the new union.

On Monday, 13 May 1833, at 2 p.m., The National Union of the Working Classes organised a public meeting on Thomas Cubitt's Calthorpe Estate near Gray's Inn Road in Coldbath Fields in Clerkenwell, Islington against the Reform Act 1832. PC Robert Culley was stabbed to death in the riot. (Note: Tony Moore (2015): "Three police officers have been killed in riots in the Metropolitan Police District since its formation in 1829. The first was Police Constable Robert Culley in 1833. The second was Station Sergeant Thomas Green in 1919 and the third was Police Constable Keith Blakelock in 1985.") The coroner's 17-person jury, mostly bakers from the Grays Inn Road area, hearing from 10 am to 11pm, returned a verdict of justifiable homicide after just half an hour, since the Riot Act had not been read. The coroner wanted ‘murdered by the mob’ and pressed them to change the verdict. Medals commemorated their decision and the jurors were treated to a riverboat cruise, they were celebrated with canons at Twickenham

== Zion Ward and Eliza Sharples ==
Carlile needed more than just the NUWC to keep the Rotunda solvent and he allowed it to be used for popular entertainment, such as a circus, concerts and a freak show.

In September 1831 he found a dissenting preacher to replace Taylor. John "Zion" Ward, who claimed to be both Jesus and the spiritual heir to Joanna Southcott, delivered millenarian sermons, prophesying the overthrow of the established church. He drew crowds of up to 2000 at the Rotunda but, unfortunately for Carlile, he soon left London in order to tour the country.

In a final attempt to revive the Rotunda's fortunes Carlile evicted the NUWC in January 1832 and brought in a new speaker, Eliza Sharples. Sharples was promoted as the first English woman to speak about religion and politics in public. Her real name was kept secret and she was known only as the "Lady of the Rotunda" or "Isis". She attacked both government and the established church along similar lines to Taylor and Ward. She also advocated women's rights within marriage and defended Eve against the Christian doctrine of original sin. At first, Sharples' novelty value drew the crowds, but her inexperience and diffidence as a speaker soon led to dwindling audiences and in April 1832 Carlile gave up the lease of the Rotunda.

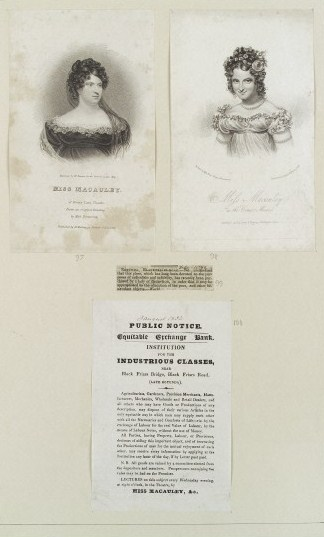
Page of ephemera from Wellcome Collection, concerning the use of the Rotunda for an "Equitable Exchange Bank".

== Rotunda radicalism after Carlile ==
The Rotunda did not entirely lose its radical connections after Carlile's departure. In August 1832 it was used by the Owenite Surrey and Southwark Equitable Exchange Bank, where workers exchanged goods which were valued according to the amount of labour required to make them. Its manager, Eliza Macauley, also gave lectures on financial reform, the superstition of the church and a woman's right to full equality. The Exchange Bank ceased trading in 1834.

In 1833 another Owenite, James Elishama Smith, delivered his Lecture on a Christian Community, in which he argued that the existing Christianity of the rich would lead to the Antichrist and that true Christianity could only be established under a system of complete equality and community of goods, as practised in the Owenite communities.

The final radical activity took place in the early 1840s. A branch of the Chartists met at the Rotunda throughout 1843, with speakers including Bronterre O'Brien, and another Owenite organisation, the Rational Society, opened the South London Rational School there. The Rational Society lacked funds to maintain the building and vacated it in 1844. The Society's secretary, George Holyoake, raised funds to convert the Rotunda into a "Philosophical Institute", to be run by Emma Martin. Martin was well known for her militant socialist, feminist and atheist speeches and pamphlets. The landlord refused to allow the Rotunda to be used for "atheistical purposes" and its association with radical causes came to an end.

== Sources ==
=== Works cited ===
- Moore, Tony (2015). The Killing of Constable Keith Blakelock: The Broadwater Farm Riot. London: Waterside Press.
- Newman, Kenneth (July 1986). "Police-Public Relations: The Pace of Change" (PDF). Police Foundation Annual Lecture. Archived from the original (PDF) on 21 July 2011.
- McCalman, I. D., 'Popular irreligion in early Victorian England: infidel preachers and radical theatricality in 1830s London', in Richard W. Davis, Richard J. Helmstadter (editors), Religion and Irreligion in Victorian Society: essays in honor of R. K. Webb (Routledge, 1992, ISBN 0 415 07625 0) p. 52.
