= Sampson Arnold Mackey =

Sampson Arnold Mackey (1765–1843) was a British shoemaker, autodidact, and cosmologist, known as "the self-taught astronomer of Norwich". He studied astronomy, geology, and mythology, writing original works and giving lectures.

== Early life ==
Sampson Arnold Mackey was born in Norwich, and was apprenticed to a shoemaker aged eleven. He spent and number of years as a soldier, before returning to shoemaking in 1811, living and working from a small rented attic in his native city.

== Theories ==
A poor man, Mackey was unable to publish any of his ideas until 1822, when The Mythological Astronomy of the Ancients Demonstrated by Restoring to their Fables & Symbols their Original Meanings was first printed.

During the 1830s, Mackey was a regular visitor to London, where he was the guest of radicals Richard Carlile and James Watson. There, he lectured at radical halls and chapels. Mackey’s aim, Malcolm Chase has written, "was to reconcile classical, biblical, and oriental cosmology with modern physics and astronomy". Mackey challenged Christian narratives of the history and age of the earth, arguing that his own theories sought to clear away "the obstructive rubbish" and "leave the road open" for those who pursued real knowledge.

One of Mackey's key theories concerned Earth's axial tilt (or obliquity), and its change over significant periods of time. For Earth, the obliquity of the ecliptic is the angle between the planes of the equator and the ecliptic (the path of the Sun on the celestial sphere), which is approximately 23°.44. The axial tilt is responsible for the seasons, as when one hemisphere tilts more towards the Sun, it experiences summer, and when away from it, winter. Mackey believed that in earlier times, the inclination had been much greater, and that the Earth cycled between an "age of horror" and a "golden age", over thousands of years, based on its inclination. Joscelyn Godwin explains Mackey's belief that:

At the maximum angle, each hemisphere would be pointed directly at the sun day and night during the summer, and pointed away for weeks on end during the winter. These extremes of light and dark, of heat and cold, would be virtually insupportable for life as we know it. In Mackey’s words, it was an “age of horror” for the planet. Conversely, if the axial angle were to continue to diminish in the future, eventually it would be perpendicular to the ecliptic... and there would be no seasons on earth, but a perpetual spring and a “golden age.” Then the cycle would begin again.

Godwin explains that as an avid reader, Mackey "could easily have come across the idea of the steady diminution of the angle of inclination", but his "originality lay in drawing conclusions without any fear of exceeding the canonical age of the earth". On the basis of cycles of 25,920 altering the axial tilt by four degrees, Mackey dated the "Age of Horror" to 425,000 years in the past, and the "Golden Age" to about a million years ago. He also believed that human beings had been around to experience and subsequently pass on stories about these periods, extending the existence of the human race to far longer than the then accepted 6000 years since the creation of the Earth.

== Death and legacy ==
Mackey died in Norwich in 1843. A portrait of him, titled "Samson Arnold Mackey (1765–1843), the Self-Taught Astronomer of Norwich" [sic], by an unknown artist, is held in the Norfolk Museums Service collection.

== Bibliography ==
- The Mythological Astronomy of the Ancients Demonstrated by restoring to their Fables & Symbols their Original Meanings (Norwich: R. Walker, 1822)
- The Mythological Astronomy of the Ancients; Part the Second: or the Key of Urania, the wards of which will unlock all the mysteries of antiquity (Norwich: R. Walker, 1823)
- Man's best friend, or, The evils of pious frauds (Norwich: R. Walker, 1826)
- The Mythological Astronomy: in Three Parts (London: Printed by Hunt and Clarke, 1827)
- A Lecture on Astronomy, Adjusted to its Dependent Science Geology: in which is shewn the plain and simple cause of the vast abundance of water in the southern hemisphere (1832)
- The Age of Emancipation (1832)
