= Susannah Wright =

- Born: Susannah Godber; 1792; Nottingham
- Died: Unknown
- Criminal charges: Charged with blasphemous libel
- Criminal penalty: Imprisoned in Newgate Prison and Coldbath Fields Prison
- Spouse: William Wright (m. 1815)

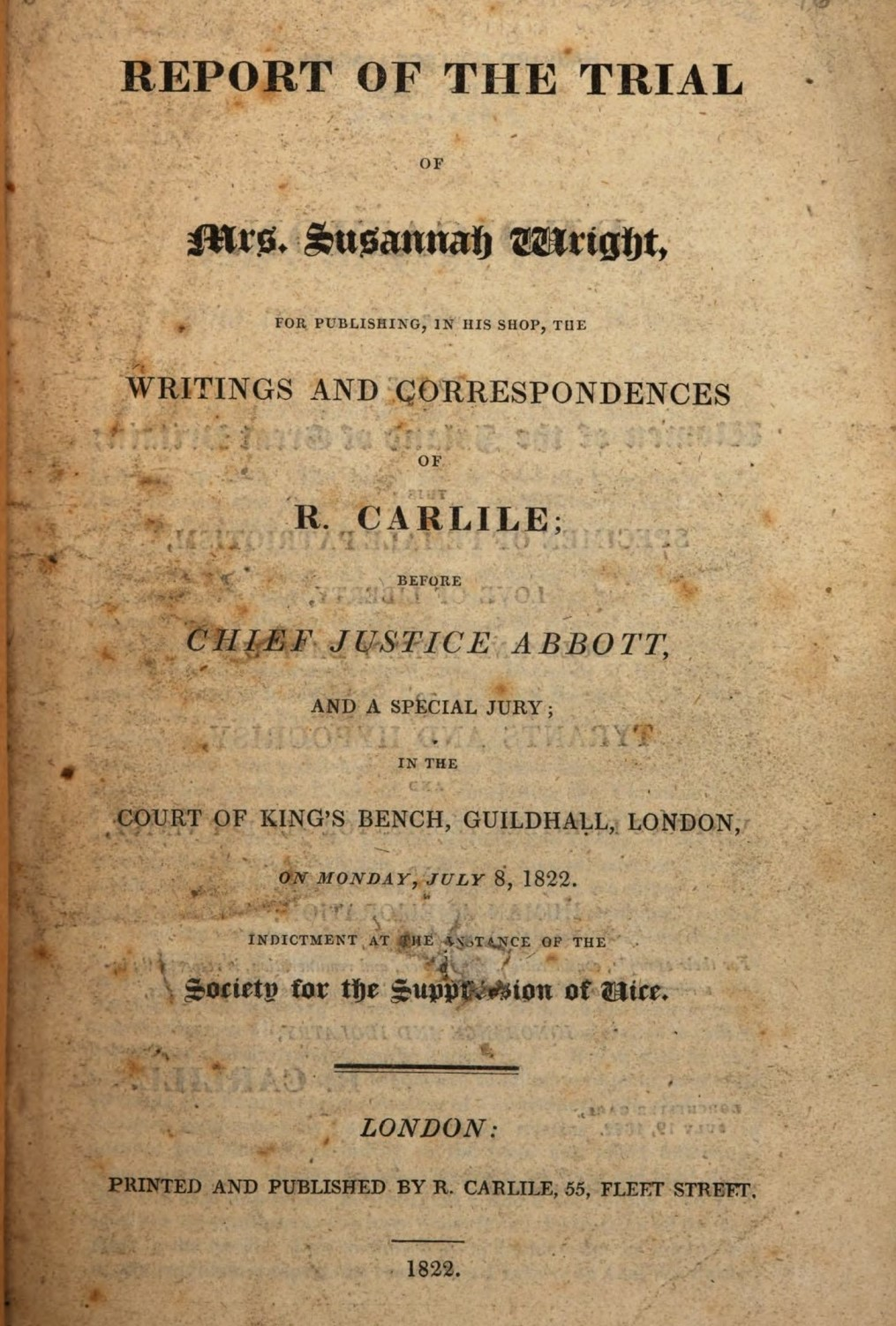
Cover of the Report of the Trial of Mrs. Susannah Wright, published by Richard Carlile, 1822

Susannah Wright (née Godber; 1792 – unknown) was an English woman imprisoned on charges of Blasphemous libel for selling works from the shop of radical publisher Richard Carlile. In total, Wright served two years in Newgate and Coldbath Fields prisons, gaining a level of notoriety as the "She-Champion of Impiety".

== Life ==
Susannah Godber was born in Nottingham in 1792, and made her living as a lace worker. By 1815, she was living in London, where she married William Wright on 25 December. Before her arrest in July 1821, Wright was already active in radical politics, publishing a number of inflammatory works with her husband, in his name, and associating with a wide circle of radicals.

When Richard Carlile, his wife Jane, and subsequently his sister Mary-Ann, were imprisoned for selling blasphemous works from his shop, Susannah Wright took over its management. Arrested and acquitted once, she was prosecuted successfully following her second arrest, and joined the Carliles in Dorchester prison.

Wright appeared in court on 8 July 1822, where she conducted her own defence. Despite a lengthy and carefully prepared speech, Wright was ordered to spend (along with her infant child) an initial ten weeks in Newgate jail. Newspapers castigated her as 'wretched and shameless', accusing Wright of having 'shunned all the distinctive shame and fear and decency of her sex'. At sentencing, on 6 February 1823, the Judge ordered Wright to 18 months in Coldbath Fields prison, Clerkenwell.

Carlile published a report of Wright's trial from Dorchester Prison, dedicating it:

To the Women of the Island of Great Britain; this Specimen of Female Patriotism, Love of Liberty, Bold and Honest Daring, to Tyrants and Hypocrisy, and Virtuous Disinterestedness for All but Virtue, and Human Amelioration; For their example, consideration, approbation, and remuneration, is respectfully inscribed by the advocate of their emancipation from these worst of slaveries, ignorance and idolatry, R. Carlile.

Susannah Wright was released from Coldbath Fields in July 1824, having lost the sight in one of her eyes, and with various other ailments. William Wright died eighteen months later. In 1826, she established her own radical bookshop in her native Nottingham, 'trading in politically extreme and heretical publications'.

Wright also "made strong demands for educational rights for women and full participation in the cultural benefits society could offer", writing in the radical newspaper The Republican.

== Legacy ==
In a biography of her father, Theophila Carlile Campbell described Susannah Wright as a "plucky little woman" to whom Richard Carlile "paid... the highest tribute for her enthusiasm, perseverance, coolness, and dauntlessness."

In a letter printed in the work, Carlile wrote that "there is scarce another woman in England who would have done for me what that woman has done, and from my knowledge of her in 1817-1819, I know that a love of principle has been her ruling motive."

Wright's date of death is unknown.
