= William Floyd Karkeek =

English veterinary surgeon

- Born: 9 September 1802; Truro
- Died: 25 June 1858 (aged 55)
- Occupation: Veterinary surgeon

William Floyd Karkeek (9 September 1802 – 25 June 1858) was an English veterinary surgeon.

== Biography ==
Karkeek was born at Truro on 9 September 1802, and obtained his diploma as a veterinary surgeon on 31 January 1825. He became a leading authority in the west of England on scientific farming, and did much to encourage it in Cornwall by reading papers at the meetings of agricultural societies, and by acting as judge at various cattle-shows. He was for twenty years secretary to the Cornwall Agricultural Association, and was from 1838 to 1841 one of the editors of ‘The Veterinarian.’ He died at Pentreve, Truro, on 25 June 1858 from the effects of a carriage accident, and was buried in the St. Mary's burial-ground. He married, 12 March 1836, at Clifton, Bristol, Jane (1815–1870), daughter of Paul and Grace Quick, and left issue.

Karkeek published:

- ‘An Essay on Artificial and other Manures,’ 1844.
- ‘An Essay on Fat and Muscle.’ This gained a prize from the Royal Agricultural Society; appeared in vol. v. of its ‘Journal’ (1845), and was published separately, London, 1844.
- ‘On the Farming of Cornwall,’ an elaborate report, which also gained a prize from the Royal Agricultural Society; appeared in its ‘Journal,’ vol. vi., 1845, and was reprinted in 1845.
- ‘Diseases of Cattle and Sheep caused by Mismanagement;’ another prize essay, ‘Journal of Royal Agricultural Society,’ vol. xi. (1850), and separately, London, 1851. Karkeek also published two essays on like subjects in the ‘Journal of the Bath and West of England Society,’ which were both reprinted.
