= William J. Oliver =

William J. Oliver, (?1774–1827) also known as Oliver the Spy, W. J. Richards and W. O. Jones, was a police informer and supposed agent provocateur at a time of social unrest, immediately after the Napoleonic Wars.

The Luddite protests of 1811–15 had been followed by the Spa Fields riots of 1816, the Blanketeers demonstration in March 1817 and soon afterwards the Pentridge or Pentrich rising, in June, and it was a time when many of Britain’s middle and upper classes saw a genuine risk of revolution.

The system of police informers was not new, but had largely escaped popular censure during the wars against France. In peacetime, it was more difficult to justify.

== Early life and family ==
Although some early newspaper reports described Oliver as Welsh and a native of either Cardigan or Pembroke, in evidence to the Home Office he claimed to be from Pontesbury in Shropshire, England. He may have been baptised there in October 1774. He married Harriet Dear of Fulbourn, Cambridgeshire, and they had a son.

By the time he came to public notice he had been living for thirty years in London, and had worked as a carpenter and builder, and also latterly as a surveyor. He had not done well as a builder and he declared that he had lost money. He was described as "a person of genteel appearance and good address, nearly six feet high, of erect figure, light hair, red and rather large whiskers, and a full face, a little pitted with the small-pox. His usual dress ... was a light fashionable coloured brown coat, black waistcoat, dark-blue mixture pantaloons, and Wellington boots".

== Career as informer ==
On 28 March 1817 Oliver approached the Home Office offering his services as an informer. He was accepted by Lord Sidmouth and on 23 April began a tour of the North and Midlands, ostensibly for the purpose of obtaining petitions for parliamentary reform and representing himself as a "Liberal patriot". To the more staid reformers he represented himself as intent on organising a large petition, while insinuating that stronger measures might soon be necessary. To the more violent reformers, angry about the suspension of the Habeas Corpus Act, he spoke of the use of physical force in London, where seventy thousand men were allegedly ready to rise, as soon as plans were complete. Birmingham, Derby, Sheffield, Wakefield, Huddersfield, Dewsbury, Leeds, Halifax, Royton, Middleton, Manchester, Barnsley and Nottingham were all visited, during which time he wrote reports for the Home Office.

Oliver toured again in June and began making plans with locals for revolution; a large meeting was to be held on 6 June 1817 in Thornhill Lees, a district of Dewsbury. However on 4 June, he slipped away and met General Byng, the commander of troops in the North and gave him advance warning of the Thornhill Lees gathering. The meeting of would-be revolutionaries, including Oliver, was surrounded and all were arrested by the troops.

A few hours later however, Oliver was spotted in Wakefield talking to a liveried footman, by a tradesman called Dickinson, whom he had earlier attempted to recruit. Dickinson asked him how he had managed to escape the troops of General Byng, and he gave an embarrassed answer and hurriedly left the town by stagecoach for Nottingham. Dickinson then spoke to the liveried footman who readily admitted to being one of General Byng’s servants. All was now clear; Oliver was not a revolutionary, but instead worked for the authorities. Word spread and the editor and reform campaigner Edward Baines of the Leeds Mercury was soon in the know.

By the time Oliver reached Nottingham, some rumours of treachery had already reached the town and he was given a gruelling cross-examination that he was lucky to survive. Jeremiah Brandreth and the Pentrich revolutionaries were not at Nottingham, however, and the news that Oliver was a spy did not reach Pentrich in time to stop its uprising.

== Pentrich rising ==
Following the brief Pentridge or Pentrich rising on the night of 9/10 June 1817 on the Nottinghamshire and Derbyshire border, three rebel leaders, Jeremiah Brandreth, Isaac Ludlam and William Turner, were captured. They were subsequently tried for treason, hanged and posthumously beheaded. Others who had taken part in the uprising were transported to Australia.

A few days after the uprising, in a series of astonishing articles in the Leeds Mercury beginning on 14 June 1817, Edward Baines alleged that the Pentrich events had in fact been incited by the earlier activities of "Oliver the Spy", who had been known to the rebels as "London delegate" William Oliver. Baines also alleged that the authorities, had known from Oliver that the rising was about to happen, but had let it go ahead in order to advance their own political ends. Baines revealed that Oliver was actually W. J. Richards, "a spy" working for Lord Sidmouth's Home Office. The newspaper article of 14 June was read out almost in its entirety by Francis Burdett on the 16th in the House of Commons, where it gave rise to sensational debates which were repeated several times. The accusation, of course, was that Oliver the Home Office informer was, in fact, the moving spirit in the Pentrich disturbances, and that without him they would not have taken place at all.

Although Oliver was not present at the uprising, debate as to his role and responsibility for it has continued ever since. While the use of informers had become routine on the part of magistrates during the Luddite period, the practice was regarded by a wide section of public opinion as being alien to the spirit of English law, and the exposure in the Leeds Mercury of Oliver’s role, as an agent provocateur, astounded public opinion. Earl Fitzwilliam, the Lord Lieutenant of the West Riding of Yorkshire, wrote to Lord Sidmouth on 14 June about the uprising, squarely blaming Oliver for what had happened:

There certainly prevails very generally in the country a strong and decided opinion that most of the events that have recently occurred in the country are to be attributed to the presence and active agitation of Mr. Oliver. He is considered as the main spring from which every movement has taken its rise. All the mischievous in the country have considered themselves as subordinate members of a great leading body of revolutionists in London, as cooperating with that body for one general purpose, and in this view to be under its instructions and directions, communicated by some delegate appointed for the purpose. Had not then a person pretending to come from that body and for that purpose, made his appearance in the country, it is not assuming too much to say that probably no movement whatever would have occurred - it does not follow that a dangerous spirit could not have been found lurking in any breast, but that that spirit would not have found its way into action.

E. P. Thompson in The Making of the English Working Class (1963) more succinctly called Oliver the "archetype of the Radical Judas".

== Move to Cape Town ==
It was plainly now in the best interests of the authorities for Oliver to leave the political scene, and in 1819 Henry Goulburn, Under-Secretary of State for the Colonies, wrote to Cape Colony Governor Lord Charles Somerset ordering that a grant of land be made to a "Mr William Jones whose object in proceeding to the Cape of Good Hope is to settle in that Colony".

Oliver arrived at Cape Town in 1820, where it was generally believed that he was the notorious police informer. Here he operated as a builder and contractor until about 1825. His friendship with John Melvill, Government Inspector of buildings, led Melvill to recommend him as his deputy in 1821. During 1821 he acted as surveyor in the Cape Town suburb of Newlands. He was commissioned to draw the first designs for an English Church, St George's, for the 1820 settlers in Grahamstown, completed in 1828.

While Oliver's career appears in two phases (and treated separately in historiographies) , in 2016 McKenzie showed that in Oliver's own lifetime, no such easy divide was made. The connections, she explained, allow us to explore the relation between British and colonial politics in the early in nineteenth century.

== Death ==
Oliver died as "William Oliver Jones" on 2 February 1827, and was buried in Green Point Cemetery on the outskirts of Cape Town.

He left a will, dated 10 December 1824, in which he described himself as "a native of Ponsonbury (sic) in the County of Salop, aged about fifty, and married to Harriet born Dear of Fulbourn, Cambridgeshire". He left "less than 6000 guilders" and a gold watch to his wife and son.

== Legacy ==
Oliver's historical significance arguably lies less in his activities than in his exposure as an officially sanctioned spy. Readers of the Leeds Mercury and the public at large, were outraged that Lord Liverpool's Government, having been alerted by Oliver, allowed the Pentrich rising to continue, rather than nipping it in the bud. The public indignation generated by the spy's activities was one more step on the road to reform, and the newspaper revelations made sure of a quite different outcome to that which had been hoped for by the Home Secretary, Lord Sidmouth.

A hundred years later, the parallels were drawn between Oliver the Spy and the undercover agent "Alex Gordon" (alias for William Rickard) whose reports were used for the convictions in the 1917 Wheeldon case but not produced at trial, and also sent (with his wife Lily) to South Africa. For example, these appeared in a 1917 editorial by Henry Massingham in The Nation by the Hammonds (1919) chapter on Oliver the Spy, and in a review of their book published in the Daily Herald. And this century, 2015 by Mulhallen's review of a new edition of Sheila Rowbotham's Friends of Alice Wheeldon.

== In literature ==
Police informers are the subject of Charles Lamb's deeply disapproving poem of 1820, "The Three Graves", which contains the lines:

I ask'd the fiend, for whom these rites were meant?
"These graves," quoth he, "when life's brief oil is spent,
When the dark night comes, and they're sinking bedwards,
I mean for Castles, Oliver, and Edwards."

John Castle [sic] was well known to the public for his role as an informer in the Spa Fields riots; and George Edwards for a similar role in the Cato Street Conspiracy.
