= Robert Taylor (Radical) =

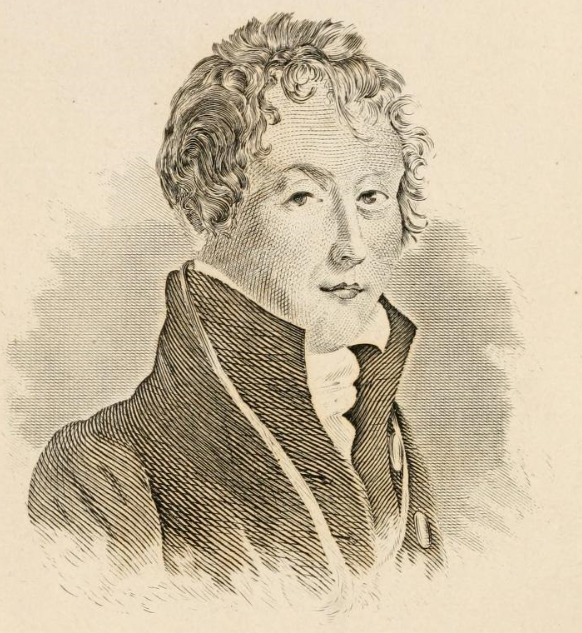
- Born: 18 August 1784; Edmonton, London
- Died: September 1844 (aged 60); Tours, France
- Occupation(s): Freethinker, radical

Reverend Robert Taylor (18 August 1784 – September 1844), was an early 19th-century Radical, a clergyman turned freethinker. His "Infidel home missionary tour" was an incident in Charles Darwin's education, leaving Darwin with a memory of "the Devil's Chaplain" as a warning of the dangers of dissent from Church of England doctrine.

== Early life ==
He was the sixth son of John and Elizabeth Taylor, born at Walnut Tree House, Edmonton, London, on 18 August 1784. His father, an ironmonger in Fenchurch Street, London, died when he was young, leaving him under the guardianship of his uncle, Edward Farmer Taylor of Chicken Hall, Bridgnorth, Shropshire. Having been at school under John Adams at Edmonton, he was articled as house pupil to Samuel Partridge, then house surgeon at the Birmingham General Hospital. In Birmingham Taylor underwent a religious conversion after hearing Edward Burn preach.

In 1805 Taylor continued as a medical student, walking Guy's and St Thomas' hospitals in London under Sir Astley Paston Cooper and Henry Cline, and was admitted a member of the College of Surgeons in 1807. Under the influence of Thomas Cotterill, perpetual curate of Lane End, Staffordshire, he decided to study for the church.

== Qualification and turn to anti-clericalism ==
Taylor studied at St John's College, Cambridge for three years to qualify as a clergyman. At that time the University of Cambridge was dominated by the established Church of England and most students were preparing for positions in the Anglican church. The Rev. Charles Simeon got Taylor his first curacy, but five years after ordination Taylor abandoned Orthodox Christianity for evangelism and then eccentric anti-clericalism.

Taylor set up a Christian Evidence Society and lectured in London pubs dressed in elaborate vestments, attacking the Anglican liturgy and the barbarities of the Establishment for what he called its "Pagan creed". At this time blasphemy was a criminal offence against the faith "by law established", and he was sentenced to a year in gaol. In his cell he wrote The Diegesis, attacking Christianity on the basis of comparative mythology and attempting to expound it as a scheme of solar myths.

He was an advocate of the Christ myth theory and has been described as a "staunch defender of the mythicist thesis".

== Infidel home missionary tour ==
Upon his release, with his book newly published, he joined forces with the Radical Richard Carlile for an "infidel home missionary tour". On Thursday 21 May 1829, they arrived in Cambridge, strolled round the colleges, and in the evening attended Holy Trinity Church for a hell-fire sermon by the Rev. Simeon, which they sneered at as "one of the worst imaginable for the morals of mankind".

Next day they rented lodgings for a fortnight above a print shop in Rose Crescent from the unsuspecting landlord William Smith, as their "Infidel Head-Quarters". By noon they had sent a printed challenge to the vice-chancellor, the leading doctors of Divinity, the heads of all the colleges and the Rev. Simeon:

CIRCULAR

The Rev. Robert Taylor, A.B., of Carey Street, Lincoln's Inn, and Mr. Richard Carlile, of Fleet-street, London, present their compliments as Infidel missionaries, to (as it may be) and most respectfully and earnestly invite discussion on the merits of the Christian religion, which they argumentatively challenge, in the confidence of their competence to prove, that such a person as Jesus Christ, alleged to have been of Nazareth, never existed; and that the Christian religion has no such origin as has been pretended; neither is it in any way beneficial to mankind; but that it is nothing more than an emanation from the ancient Pagan religion. The researches of the Rev. Robert Taylor, on the subject, are embodied in his newly published work, THE DIEGESIS, in which may be found the routine of their argument.

They also impugn the honesty of a continued preaching, while discussion is challenged on the whole of the merits of the Christian religion.

At home, for conversation, at any appointed time. 7, Rose Crescent.

They then went around the University precincts, with Taylor immaculately dressed in university cap and gown greeting old friends, giving out circulars and seeking out freethinkers.

On the Saturday morning an anticipated article about their mission failed to appear in the morning paper. The university proctors who were in charge of discipline interrogated the landlord, then demanded his lodging-house licence. Smith refused to hand it over, and appealed to the Vice-Chancellor, "most deferentially" asking the reason as he had not violated any regulations, and the licence had been granted its annual renewal the day before, but received no reply. The Vice-Chancellor and Proctors revoked the licence and made the lodgings out of bounds, posting a notice in the butteries of all the colleges to warn the students, among them Charles Darwin, then in his second year.

The Radical pair responded to this "paltry spite" the next day by putting a public notice on the door of the University Library, challenging a university that "punishes the innocent... crushes the weak... oppresses [and] persecutes", taking away half the livelihood of Smith, with his wife and six children. On Monday all the students were talking about this iniquitous situation, and a group of "young men" prepared vigilante action against the Radicals to avenge the landlord. Carlile and Taylor heard of this, and on Tuesday apologised to the landlord, prodded the authorities to restore his licence, and slipped out of town. They were satisfied that they had uncovered "about fifty... young collegians, who were somewhat bold in vowing Infidelity among each other", though few would "break... the shackles" of their education and they would have "a most painful conflict to endure."

Their tour included Lancashire, and at a meeting in Bolton they met Eliza Sharples, who was to continue propagating their message in performances at the Rotunda while they were imprisoned.

== The Devil's Chaplain ==
Amidst public unrest in July 1830 when Charles X of France was deposed by middle-class republicans and given refuge in England by the Tory government of Arthur Wellesley, 1st Duke of Wellington, Carlile gave Taylor a platform in the Blackfriars Rotunda, a ramshackle building on the south bank of the River Thames where republican atheists gathered. Several times a week Taylor dressed in "canonicals", staged infidel melodramas, preaching bombastic sermons to artisans. Two Sunday sermons on "The Devil" caused particular outrage when he pronounced "God and the Devil... to be but one and the self-same being... Hell and Hell-fire... are, in the original, nothing more than names and titles of the Supreme God." He was then dubbed "The Devil's Chaplain", and thousands of copies of his ceremonies were circulated in a seditious publication, The Devil's Pulpit. As the Tory government collapsed in November, Taylor preached against the establishment while a revolutionary tricolour flew from the roof of The Rotunda.

At the start of April 1831 Taylor was again indicted for blasphemy over two Easter sermons in the last days of The Rotunda. He was sentenced to two years' imprisonment in Horsemonger Lane Gaol whence he sent protesting letters to The Times, but his pleas were snubbed by the Home Secretary William Lamb, 2nd Viscount Melbourne. In a letter to W. Watts, Taylor described his physical decline and fear that "the Christians have determined to kill me... I never expect to leave this Bastile but Heels foremost. Your greatly obliged Murdered Friend, Robert Taylor." (Despite his fears, he lived until 1844. The letter is now in the possession of Larry M. Wright, author of Christianity Astrology and Myth.)

By January 1832 a "new occupation of the building" was promoted around London. From prison Taylor wrote that "the spirit of the Rotunda lives", and "it opens with new spirit, with new attraction, with all that is lovely and virtuous in woman to grace it." From 9 February Eliza Sharples appeared as "Isis", the "Lady of the Rotunda", giving theatrically presented lectures which energetically decried Christianity, the priesthood, and the political establishment. In the first lecture she said she was "neither of Taylor nor Carlisle; neither of Owen nor St Simon", but would "be the little busy bee extracting honey from all their doctrines". There were soon claims that her lectures were, at least in part, written by Taylor and Carlisle. Her fiery presentations initially attracted attention, but interest fell away and her lectures finished at the end of April.

== Later life ==
In 1833 Taylor married an elderly lady of means, but was sued for breach of promise by Georgiana Richards, housekeeper to the Blackfriars Rotunda. To avoid paying £250 damages awarded to Richards, he moved to France and practised as a surgeon at Tours.

== Darwin recalls Taylor ==
Taylor would be remembered by Charles Darwin as a warning example of a social pariah. In 1857 as he worked towards the publication of his theory he wrote "What a book a Devil's Chaplain might write on the clumsy, wasteful, blundering low & horridly cruel works of Nature!" in what Desmond and Moore argue is a reference to Taylor's nickname. However the term "the Devil's Chaplain" goes back to Geoffrey Chaucer who has his Parson say "Flatereres been the develes chapelleyns, that syngen evere placebo."

As the reaction to Darwin's theory developed in March 1860 he described his close ally Thomas Huxley as his "good and kind agent for the propagation of the Gospel – i.e. the devil's gospel."

== Publications ==
- Syntagma of the Evidence of the Christian Religion (1828)
- The Diegesis: Being a Discovery of the Origin, Evidences, and Early History of Christianity, Never Yet Before or Elsewhere So Fully and Faithfully Set Forth (1829, 1860)
- Thirteen Astro-Theological Sermons (1848)
- Devil's Pulpit: Or Astro-Theological Sermons (1857)

== See also ==
- Rotunda radicals

== Sources ==
- "Taylor, Robert (1784-1844)" . Dictionary of National Biography. London: Smith, Elder & Co. 1885–1900.
- Adrian Desmond and James Moore, Darwin (London: Michael Joseph, the Penguin Group, 1991). ISBN 0-7181-3430-3
- Julian Browning Autographs Religion & Philosophy, note on Autograph Letter, Signed, to W.Watts, 4 November 1831.
- Larry M. Wright, 'Christianity Astrology and Myth',(USA, The Oak Hill Free Press, PO box: 61274, Pasadena, California, CA 911116).
- This article incorporates text from a publication now in the public domain: Lee, Sidney, ed. (1898). "Taylor, Robert (1784-1844)". Dictionary of National Biography. Vol. 55. London: Smith, Elder & Co.
