= Thomas Jonathan Wooler =

English activist (1786–1853)

Thomas Jonathan Wooler (1786 – 29 October 1853) was a British publisher active in the Radical movement of early 19th century Britain, best known for his satirical journal The Black Dwarf.

He was born in Yorkshire and lived there for a short time before moving to London as a printer's apprentice. He worked for the radical journal The Reasoner, then became editor of The Statesman. His interest in legal matters led him to write and publish the pamphlet An Appeal to the Citizens of London against the Packing of Special Juries in 1817.

In response to the Gagging Acts (Treason Act 1817 and Seditious Meetings Act 1817) passed by the British government in January 1817, Wooler started publishing The Black Dwarf as a new radical unstamped (untaxed) journal. Within three months, he was arrested and charged with seditious libel. The prosecution claimed that Wooler had written articles libelling Lord Liverpool's government, but Wooler, defending himself by convincing the jury that although he had published the article, he had not written it himself, and therefore was not guilty. He continued to publish The Black Dwarf and to use it to argue for parliamentary reform.

Wooler was an active supporter of Major John Cartwright and his Hampden Club movement. In 1819, he joined the campaign to elect Sir Charles Wolseley to represent Birmingham in the House of Commons. Birmingham had not been given permission to have an election, and the campaigners were arrested and charged with "forming a seditious conspiracy to elect a representative to Parliament without lawful authority." Wooler was found guilty and sentenced to eighteen months' imprisonment.

After his most prominent patron, Cartwright, died in 1824, Wooler gave up publishing the Black Dwarf. For a while, he edited the British Gazette, but, after the Reform Act 1832 was passed, he gave up politics to become a lawyer, though Lincoln's Inn refused to admit him as a student in 1825. He attempted to obtain writ of mandamus against the Inn, but was unsuccessful. He then became a prisoners' advocate at the police-courts, and wrote books and pamphlets on the British legal system, including Every Man his Own Lawyer in 1845.
