= The Black Dwarf (journal) =

The Black Dwarf (1817–1824) was a satirical radical journal of early 19th century Britain. It was published by Thomas Jonathan Wooler, starting in January 1817 as an eight-page newspaper, then later becoming a 32-page pamphlet. It was priced at 4d a week until the Six Acts brought in by the Government in 1819 to suppress radical unrest forced a price increase to 6d. In 1819 it was selling in issues of roughly 12,000 to working people such as James Wilson at a time when the reputable upper-middle class journal Blackwood's Magazine sold in issues of roughly 4,000 copies.

== Contents ==
Its provocative content included iconoclastic satire, parodies and humour supporting Reform and working class interests, publishing their popular culture of poetry, ballads and songs to support radical ideas and the culture they supported, as well as reporting speeches and quotations, questions, answers and parodies. It helped to destabilise lower class deference to the political classes and increase their literary sophistication, providing style rather than explicit analysis. An 1817 biblical parody attacked the House of Lords; "The LORD giveth, and the LORDS taketh away. Blessed be the way of the Lords". When the radical William Hone was tried for publishing a parody of parts of the Book of Common Prayer and acquitted in January 1818, Wooler based his response on "This Is the House That Jack Built":

This is the verdict recorded and found,
By the Jury unbiass'd, unpack'd and unfrowned
That frighten'd the Judge so choleric and old,
Who swore "by the oath of his office" so bold,
'Twas an impious, blasphemous libel, and so,
The man should be ruined ex-oficio,
By the servant of servants who blustered so big,
With his ears in his hand and his wits in his wig;
To please the Ministers
Who hated the truth
That was told by the man
Who published the parodies.

Thomas Jonathan Wooler started publishing The Black Dwarf as a new radical unstamped journal in response to the Gagging Acts passed by the British government in January 1817. Within three months he was arrested and charged with seditious libel. The prosecution claimed that Wooler had written articles libelling Lord Liverpool's government, but Wooler, defending himself, convinced the jury that though he had published the article he had not written it, and so was not guilty. Throughout, Wooler continued to publish The Black Dwarf and to use it to argue for parliamentary reform. At a time when The Black Dwarf was banned, distribution was taken on by Richard Carlile.

After his main patron Major John Cartwright died in 1824 Wooler gave up publishing the journal on a despondent note: "In ceasing his political labours, the Black Dwarf has to regret one mistake, and that a serious one. He commenced writing under the idea that there was a PUBLIC in Britain, and that public devotedly attached to the cause of parliamentary reform. This, it is but candid to admit, was an error".

== Twentieth century revival ==
Black Dwarf as a title was resurrected in 1968 as a New Leftist publication.
