= Richard Carlile =

English radical publisher and writer (1790–1843)

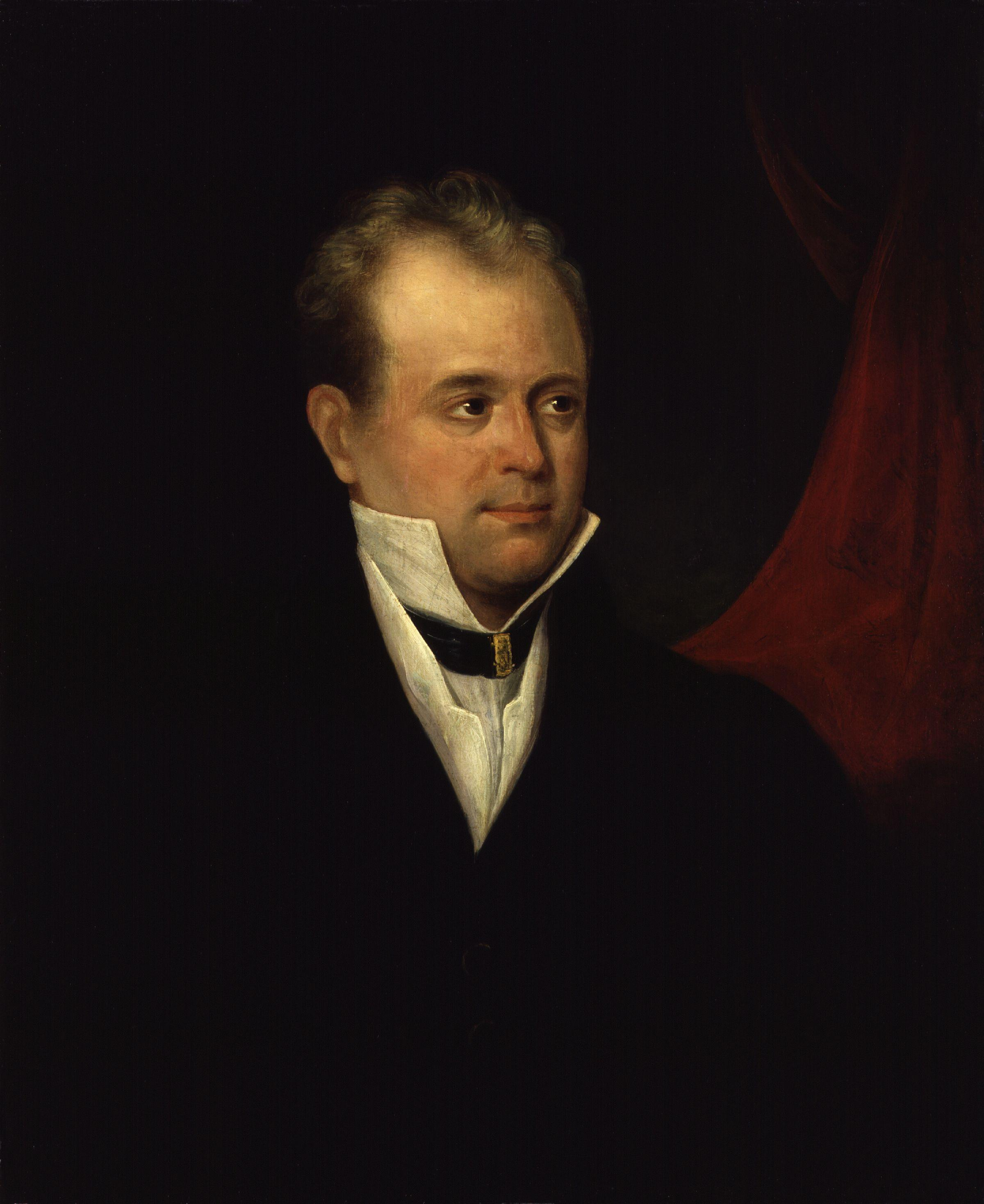
- Born: 8 December 1790; Ashburton, Devon, England
- Died: 10 February 1843 (aged 52); London, England
- Occupation: Publisher, agitator, activist
- Spouse: Jane Cousins (m. 1813)
- Partner: Eliza Sharples
- Children: 6

Richard Carlile (8 December 1790 – 10 February 1843) was an English radical publisher and writer. He was an important agitator for the establishment of universal suffrage and freedom of the press in the United Kingdom.

== Early life and career ==
Richard Carlile was born on 8 December 1790. He was the second of three children of William Carlile and Elizabeth (née Brookings). His father, from a Devon family, worked variously as a shoemaker, exciseman, teacher, and soldier. William Carlile published a book on mathematics but later became a drunkard, deserted the family a few years after his son's birth, and died shortly thereafter. His mother ran a shop in Lawrence Lane, Ashburton, and was a devout Anglican, providing her children with a strict Christian upbringing.

Carlile received an elementary education at two local free schools until age 12 but did not attend the prestigious local grammar school. After leaving school, he worked at Edward Lee's chemist shop in Exeter but soon returned to his mother's shop. In 1803, through his father's family connections, he became a tinplate worker. For the next 15 years, he worked as an itinerant tinworker, making domestic items. The trade's decline forced him to move frequently in southern England, living in constant anxiety about future employment.

From 1812 to 1813, while in Portsmouth, he considered joining the Church of England, inspired by sermons from reforming theologians Lant Carpenter and David Bogue. These were difficult years for Carlile, compounded when he married Jane Cousins, of poor origins from Hampshire, on 24 May 1813 in Alverstoke. The couple moved to London, hoping for better prospects. Living in Bloomsbury, Carlile worked for Benham & Sons and Masterman, Matthews & Co. between 1813 and 1817. They had four children: Richard (1814–1854), Alfred (b. 1816), Thomas Paine (1818–1819), and Thomas Paine (b. 1819).

== Politics and publishing ==
His favourite writing table in the library of the South Place Ethical Society

"The favorite writing table and fellow prisoner for more than nine years of Richard Carlile during his struggle to obtain the freedom of the press 1816 to 1834."

His interest in politics was kindled first by economic conditions in the winter of 1816, when Carlile was put on short-time work by his employer creating serious problems for the family: "I shared the general distress of 1816 and it was this that opened my eyes." He became influenced by the leading campaigners for economic and parliamentary reform, such as Henry Hunt and William Cobbett. As a way of making a living he sold radical publications, such as Cobbett's Political Register and Thomas Wooler's The Black Dwarf, on the streets of London, often walking "thirty miles for a profit of eighteen pence".

In April 1817 he formed a publishing business with the printer William Sherwin and rented a shop in Fleet Street. They produced a radical journal, Sherwin's Weekly Political Register, which Sherwin edited and Carlile published. He also published pamphlets, including unauthorised copies of William Hone's parody of parts of the Book of Common Prayer, for which Hone had already been arrested. For this, Carlile was imprisoned awaiting trial for seditious libel and blasphemy. He remained there for four months until he was released, following Hone's acquittal.

Prison did not deter Carlile from radical activity. He immersed himself in the literature of religious freethought and wrote his first pamphlet, The Order for the Administration of the Loaves and Fishes, a parody of the Anglican Communion Service. He also began to reprint the political essays of Thomas Paine, including Common Sense and The Rights of Man. In order to reach as wide an audience as possible, these first appeared in the Weekly Political Register, then as two-penny pamphlets, and finally as bound volumes.

Upon his release, Carlile threw himself into publicising radical causes. He published the trades union newspaper, Gorgon, edited by John Wade, Francis Place and John Gast, and assisted Henry Hunt's unsuccessful campaign to be elected to Parliament. He continued his project to republish all of Paine's works. This enhanced his reputation in working-class circles, but also made the government more determined to silence him. In 1819, following his publication of Paine's long-banned The Age of Reason, Carlile was faced by a series of law suits from both the Attorney General and the Society for the Suppression of Vice. This had the effect of increasing sales of Carlile's publications and by the summer of 1819 he claimed to be making a profit of £50 per week.

== Peterloo and The Republican ==
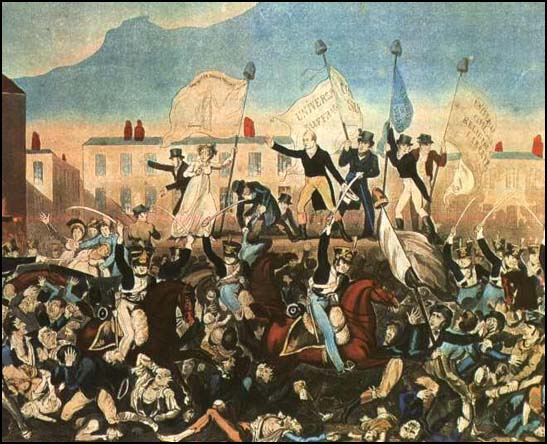
Print of the Peterloo Massacre published by Richard Carlile

Carlile was one of the scheduled main speakers at the reform meeting on 16 August 1819 at St. Peter's Fields in Manchester. Just as Henry Hunt was about to speak, the crowd was attacked by the yeomanry in what became known as the Peterloo massacre. Carlile escaped and was hidden by radical friends before he caught the mail coach to London and published his eyewitness account, giving the first full report of what had happened, in Sherwin's Weekly Political Register of 18 August 1819. His placards proclaimed "Horrid Massacres at Manchester".

The government responded by closing Sherwin's Political Register, confiscating the stock of newspapers and pamphlets. Carlile changed the name to The Republican and in its issue of 27 August 1819 demanded that "The massacre... should be the daily theme of the Press until the murderers are brought to justice.... Every man in Manchester who avows his opinions on the necessity of reform, should never go unarmed – retaliation has become a duty, and revenge an act of justice."

Carlile was prosecuted for blasphemy, blasphemous libel and sedition for publishing material that might encourage people to hate the government in his newspaper, and for publishing Tom Paine's Common Sense, The Rights of Man and the Age of Reason (which criticised the Church of England).

In October 1819, he was found guilty of blasphemy and seditious libel and sentenced to three years in Dorchester Gaol with a fine of £1,500. When he refused to pay the fine, his premises in Fleet Street were raided and his stock was confiscated. While he was in jail he continued to write articles for The Republican which was now published by Carlile's wife, Jane, and thanks to the publicity it now outsold pro-government newspapers such as The Times.

To curb newspapers the government had raised the ½d tax on newspapers, first imposed in 1712, to 3½d in 1797, then 4d in 1815. From December 1819 it set a minimum price of 7d, with further restrictions. At a time when workers earned less than 10 shillings (120d.) a week this made it hard for them to afford radical newspapers, and publishers tried various strategies to evade the tax. Groups would pool their resources in reading societies and subscription societies to purchase a book or journal in common, and frequently read it aloud to one another as was the case with James Wilson.

By 1821, Carlile was a declared atheist (having previously been a Deist) and published his Address to Men of Science, in favour of materialism and education. In the same year Jane Carlile was in turn sentenced to two years imprisonment for seditious libel, and her place as publisher was taken by Richard Carlile's sister, Mary. Within six months she was imprisoned for the same offence. The process was repeated with eight of his shop workers, including Susannah Wright, and over 150 men and women were sent to prison for selling The Republican.

Carlile's sentence ended in 1823 but he was immediately arrested and returned to prison for not paying his £1,500 fine, so the process continued until he was eventually released on 25 November 1825. In the next edition of The Republican he expressed the hope that his long confinement would result in the freedom to publish radical political ideas. An example of the support he received from around the country is the £1.5.1 sent to him in Dorchester jail by forty working men in the West Yorkshire village of Hunslet, accompanied by a noble letter on behalf of those "few Friends to Truth and Justice".

He then published further journals, The Lion which campaigned against child labour and The Promptor. He argued that "equality between the sexes" should be the objective of all reformers, and in 1826 published Every Woman's Book advocating birth control and the sexual emancipation of women. Cobbett denounced this book as "so filthy, so disgusting, so beastly, as to shock even the lewdest men and women".

Carlile was an advocate of the Christ myth theory. He did not believe that Jesus existed. He debated Unitarian minister John Relly Beard in The Republican, 1826.

== The Devil's Chaplain ==
He joined up with the radical and sceptical clergyman Robert Taylor and set out on an "infidel home missionary tour" which reached Cambridge on Thursday 21 May 1829 and caused a considerable upset to the University of Cambridge where a young Charles Darwin was a second-year student.

At their meeting in Bolton, Lancashire, Carlile met Eliza Sharples, who was to become his long term mistress. With her, he had two further children.

Carlile then opened a ramshackle building on the south bank of the River Thames, the Blackfriars Rotunda, and in widespread public unrest in July 1830 this became a gathering place for republicans and atheists. Taylor staged infidel melodramas, preaching outrageous sermons which got him dubbed "The Devil's Chaplain". Thousands of copies of these sermons were circulated in a seditious publication, The Devil's Pulpit.

== Jailed again ==
In 1831, he was jailed, under the charge of seditious libel, given two and a half years for writing an article in support of agricultural labourers campaigning against wage cuts and advising the strikers to regard themselves as being at war with the government.

He left prison deeply in debt, and government fines had taken from him the finances needed to publish newspapers.

His political and social opinions never altered, but his philosophy underwent a change in the 1830s. In 1837 H. Robinson published the results of his later thinking in the book Extraordinary Conversion and Public Declaration of Richard Carlile of London to Christianity.

In 1834, he was tried for creating a public nuisance, when he displayed two effigies in the windows of his shop at 62 Fleet Street, one in blue representing a broker titled "Temporal broker" and another dressed as a bishop titled "Spiritual broker". A large group of people were often gathered there, impeding traffic and causing quarrels. He was found guilty, but judgment was respited.

After living for some years in extreme poverty in Enfield, Carlile returned to Fleet Street in 1842, dying there the following year. He donated his body for medical research. Large numbers of people attended his funeral in Kensal Green Cemetery on Sunday 26 February 1843, where his sons protested at the Christian burial rite being administered in the common grave he was being buried in – citing that their father had "passed his life in opposition to all priestcraft".

== Writings ==
- The Deist; or, Moral Philosopher: Being an Impartial Inquiry After Moral and Theological Truths (1819)
- A Letter to the Society for the Suppression of Vice: On Their Malignant Efforts to Prevent a Free Enquiry After Truth and Reason (1819)
- An Address to Men of Science: Calling Upon Them to Stand Forward and Vindicate the Truth from the Foul Grasp and Persecution of Superstition (1821)
- Life of Thomas Paine: Written Purposely to Bind With His Writings (1822)
- The Character of the Jew Books: Being a Defence of the Natural Innocence of Man, against Kings and Priests, or Tyrants and Impostors (1822)
- Every Woman's Book or What is Love? (1826)
