= Hampden Clubs =

The Hampden Clubs were political campaigning and debating societies formed in England in the early 19th century as part of the Radical Movement. They were particularly concentrated in the Midlands and the northern counties, and were closely associated with the popular movements for social and political reform that arose in the years following the end of the Napoleonic Wars. They were forced underground, and eventually disbanded in the face of legislation and pressure from the authorities.

== Origins ==
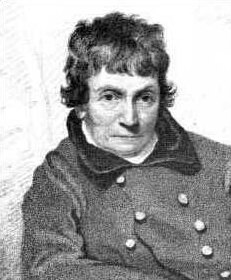
John Cartwright is usually regarded as the founder of the Hampden Clubs

The original Hampden Club was formed in London in 1812. John Cartwright is generally regarded as the originator and founder although evidence has been offered that Cartwright's friend Thomas Northmore actually initiated the clubs. Edward Blount was another founder member. Cartwright certainly dominated the movement from 1813 onwards. A former naval and militia officer with a long record of political activism, he toured northwest England to promote the idea of a forum for political debate among ordinary people. There had been no similar institutions since the London Corresponding Society, which had disbanded in 1794. The clubs were intended to bring together middle-class moderates and lower-class Radicals in the reform cause and were named for John Hampden, an English Civil War Parliamentary leader.

In 1813, Cartwright was arrested in Huddersfield while promoting the clubs. He made a further promotional tour in 1815.

The first Hampden Club outside London was formed in 1816 by William Fitton at Royton. Other clubs in the North-West soon followed; in Middleton the radical weaver-poet Samuel Bamford started one. Other clubs were formed in Oldham, Manchester, Rochdale, Ashton-under-Lyne and Stockport.

== Activities ==
Club members paid a penny per week subscription and usually met weekly for political discussion and debate. Radical pamphlets were read, and newspaper articles by prominent reformers like William Cobbett. Samuel Bamford describes the activities of club members in positive terms, emphasising them as a peaceful alternative to riot and destruction of property.

Hampden clubs were now established in many of our large towns, and the villages and districts around them. Cobbett's books were printed in a cheap form; the labourers read them, and thenceforward became deliberate and systematic in their proceedings. Nor were there wanting men of their own class, to encourage and direct the new converts. The Sunday Schools of the preceding thirty years had produced many working men of sufficient talent to become readers, writers, and speakers in the village meetings for parliamentary reform. Some also were found to possess a rude poetic talent, which rendered their effusions popular, and bestowed an additional charm on their assemblages; and by such various means, anxious listeners at first, and then zealous proselytes, were drawn from the cottages of quiet nooks and dingles, to the weekly readings and discussions of the Hampden clubs.

In January 1817, regional Hampden Clubs and similar political debating societies sent 70 delegates to a convention at the Crown & Anchor tavern in Strand, London, well known as a meeting-place of radicals. The assembly was called by Cartwright and Jones Burdett, brother of Sir Francis Burdett. To avoid falling foul of the Seditious Societies Act, the convention met in public session and described itself as a gathering of deputies from petitioning communities, discussing how to achieve constitutional reform. The wording proposed by the Hampden Clubs' leadership included votes for all householders, electoral boundary reform and annual elections. However, the moderates were outvoted by those who favoured more radical reforms, and there were angry words from those who felt the Clubs' plans had been hijacked by others. The final resolutions of the meeting carried no reference to the Hampden Clubs. Reports of the meeting in The Times criticised both the meeting and its outcome and accused the delegates of attempting to overthrow the Constitution.

== Suppression and dissolution ==
The clubs were regarded with suspicion by the authorities, which saw them as breeding grounds for the growing radicalism of the times. On 9 February 1817 a secret Parliamentary Committee report concluded that the real object of the Hampden Clubs and similar institutions was to foment "an insurrection, so formidable from numbers, as by dint of physical strength to overpower all resistance". The government began to introduce legislation such as the Seditious Meetings Act 1817, and it became more difficult for political clubs to meet. For example, the Birmingham Hampden Club, founded in September 1816 and boasting 300 regular attendees by the following January, had a moderate ethos and publicly condemned violence after a local riot but struggled to find venues as publicans were pressured not to permit club meetings on their premises. Private rooms were found, but by April 1817, in an atmosphere of suspicion and with the government spy and agent provocateur William J. Oliver active in the city, regular club meetings were suspended. In Manchester, the movement's leaders were targeted by the city's deputy constable, Joseph Nadin, who arrested many of them, including Samuel Bamford, after the unrest of March 1817 and sent them to London in irons, where some spent months in prison before their release without charge. With the Hampden clubs stifled, the Lancashire leadership formed the Patriotic Union Society, the body that called the 1819 public meeting for political reform that became the Peterloo Massacre.
