= Sedition Act 1661 =

Act of the Parliament of England

Sedition Act 1661 (Note: The citation of this act by this short title was authorised by section 5 of, and the second schedule to, the Statute Law Revision Act 1948. Due to the repeal of those provisions, it is now authorised by section 19(2) of the Interpretation Act 1978.)
- Act of Parliament
- Parliament of England
- Long title: An Act for Safety and Preservation of His Majesties Person and Government against Treasonable and Seditious practices and attempts. (Note: These words are printed against this act in the second column of the second schedule to the Statute Law Revision Act 1948, which is headed "Title".)
- Citation: 13 Cha. 2 St. 1. c. 1
- Territorial extent: England and Wales

Dates
- Royal assent: 30 July 1661
- Commencement: 8 May 1661 (Note: Start of session.)
- Repealed: 21 July 1967
Other legislation
| Amended by | Statute Law Revision Act 1863; Statute Law Revision Act 1888; Criminal Justice Act 1948 |
| Repealed by | Criminal Law Act 1967 |
| Relates to | Treason Act 1695; Treason Act 1795; Treason Felony Act 1848 |

Status: Repealed

Text of statute as originally enacted

The Sedition Act 1661 (13 Cha. 2 St. 1. c. 1) was an act of the Parliament of England, although it was extended to Scotland in 1708. Passed shortly after the Restoration of Charles II, it is no longer in force, but some of its provisions continue to survive today in the Treason Act 1695 (7 & 8 Will. 3. c. 3) and the Treason Felony Act 1848 (11 & 12 Vict. c. 12). One clause which was included in the Treason Act 1695 was later adapted for the United States Constitution.

== Two witnesses rule ==
The most important feature of the act was that it reintroduced a significant new rule of evidence in high treason trials, namely that nobody could be convicted of treason except by the evidence of "two lawful and credible witnesses upon oath ... brought in person before him or them face to face", or if he confessed "willingly without violence". (This rule had previously been enacted in section 22 of the Treason Act 1547, and again in section XI of the Treason Act 1554, which however differed from the other versions by only requiring the witnesses "if [they were] living and within the realm".) This clause of the 1661 act, section 5, was replaced by the Treason Act 1695, which added that the two witnesses had to have witnessed the same offence (although not necessarily the same "overt act" of the offence). The rule was inherited by the United States and was incorporated into the US Constitution in 1787, which added that both witnesses had to have witnessed the same overt act. Section 5 of the 1661 Act was cited by US Supreme Court justice Antonin Scalia in his judgement in Crawford v. Washington, a case about the "Confrontation Clause" of the Sixth Amendment in 2004.

The 1661 version of this rule only applied to the new forms of treason (and other offences) which were created by the 1661 act (see § New offences below). The 1695 act applied to all forms of high treason, except counterfeiting coins.

The rule was abolished in the United Kingdom by the Treason Act 1945, which made the rules of evidence and procedure in treason cases the same as in a murder trial. During the passage of the Treason Bill through Parliament the Home Secretary, Sir Donald Somervell, said:

It is, presumably, based on the idea that one witness may be unreliable, whereas, on the other hand, if you allege two overt acts, and if you have one witness of each, then the two unreliabilities are taken as adding up to a sufficient certainty. It was very much criticised from the moment it was enacted.

Sir William Blackstone wrote in his Commentaries on the Laws of England:

the principal reason, undoubtedly, is to secure the subject from being sacrificed to fictitious conspiracies, which have been the engines of profligate and crafty politicians in all ages.

== New offences ==
=== Treason ===
The act created four new kinds of high treason, in addition to those already existing. The act made it treason to:

within the realm, or without, compass, imagine, invent, devise or intend death or destruction or any bodily harm tending to death or destruction, maim or wounding, imprisonment or restraint of the person of ... the King

or, within the realm or without, compass, imagine, invent, devise or intend:

- to deprive the King of his crown, or
- to levy war against the King, "within this realm, or without", or
- to "move or stir" any foreigner to invade England or any other country belonging to the King (this latter clause was derived from the Rump Parliament's Treasons Act 1649, which had been declared void in 1660).

These provisions were expressed only to have effect during the lifetime of the King, Charles II. However they were temporarily re-enacted, with two modifications, by the Treason Act 1795 (36 Geo. 3. c. 7), and then made permanent by the Treason Act 1817 (57 Geo. 3. c. 6), both under George III. In the 1795 version, "the realm" meant Great Britain (in 1848 the act was extended to cover Ireland), and levying war against the King was only an offence under the act if done in order to compel the King to change his policies or to "intimidate or overawe" Parliament. (However under the Treason Act 1351 (25 Edw. 3 Stat. 5. c. 2), which was not affected, levying war against the King was still treason, without these additional criteria.)

The difference between the Treason Act 1351 and the acts of 1661 and 1795 was that while the 1351 act required an actual levying of war, the later acts also made it treason to "compass, imagine, invent, devise, or intend" a levying of war.

The penalty for treason was death. However, the last three treasons on the above list were reduced to felonies by the Treason Felony Act 1848 (11 & 12 Vict. c. 12)), which made the maximum sentence life imprisonment. The 1848 act is still in force. Imprisoning or otherwise harming the Sovereign continued to be high treason, punishable by death, until the 1795 act was repealed by the Crime and Disorder Act 1998. Assaulting the Sovereign is still an offence under the Treason Act 1842, which carries a maximum sentence of seven years.

In some Commonwealth of Nations countries, such as Canada, Australia and New Zealand it is still treason to imprison or harm the King.

=== Other offences ===
Besides treason, the 1661 act created other offences designed to protect the national security. These offences required the evidence of two witnesses or a confession, and had to be prosecuted within six months of the offence being committed. The king had to personally authorise a prosecution.

Anyone who in speech or writing called the King a heretic or papist, or who incited "hatred or dislike of the Person of His Majestie or the established Government" was to be disqualified from holding any public, military or ecclesiastical office (but could keep his peerage). This measure was expressed only to last during the King's lifetime.

A permanent offence (until it was repealed) was committed by any person who claimed (in writing or in speech) that the Long Parliament had not been dissolved, or that anyone had a duty to obey an oath to change the government, or that Parliament could legislate without the king's assent.

== Other provisions ==
The act declared that the Solemn League and Covenant was null and void. It also preserved Parliament's privilege of free speech, and the right of a peer to be tried in the House of Lords.

A peer who was convicted of any offence under the act was to be disqualified from sitting in the House of Lords, unless pardoned (although he would keep his title).

== Repeal ==
Sections 1 and 2 of the act were repealed by section 1 of, and the schedule to, the Statute Law Revision Act 1863 (26 & 27 Vict. c. 125), which came into force on 28 July 1863.

There were some other repeals over the years, and then the whole act, so far as unrepealed, was repealed by section 13(2) of, and part I of schedule 4 to, the Criminal Law Act 1967, which came into force on 21 July 1967.

== See also ==
- Tumultuous Petitioning Act 1661
- High treason in the United Kingdom
- Treason Act
- Sedition Act (disambiguation)
