= Treasons Act 1649 =

Obsolete 1649 law of England

The Treasons Act 1649 or Act declaring what offences shall be adjudged Treason was an act passed on 17 July 1649 by the Rump Parliament during the Commonwealth of England. It superseded the Act declaring what offences shall be adjudged Treason passed about two months earlier on 14 May 1649.

The act was deemed necessary because the Commonwealth was a republic, so treason against the person of the king had no meaning. There were certain threats that faced the Commonwealth, which this law helped to address.

However, all acts and ordinances passed by Parliament during the Civil War and Interregnum did not have royal assent, so they were deemed to be null and void following the Restoration of the monarchy in 1660.

== Legislation and political events ==
King Charles I of England was beheaded on 30 January 1649. Shortly after his death the Rump Parliament passed a series of acts which established the Commonwealth (see High Court of Justice for the trial of Charles I).

The execution of Charles I was delayed until later in the day on 30 January than had originally been planned, so that the House of Commons could pass an emergency act, the "Act prohibiting the proclaiming any person to be King of England or Ireland, or the Dominions thereof", that made it an offence to proclaim a new King, and to declare the representatives of the people, the House of Commons, as the source of all just power. Parliament voted to abolish the House of Lords on 6 February and to abolish the monarchy on 7 February; an act abolishing the kingship was formally passed by Parliament on 17 March, followed by an act to abolish the House of Lords on 19 March. The establishment of a Council of State was approved on 14 February as was an Act declaring what offences shall be adjudged Treason, and on 19 May An Act declaring England to be a Commonwealth was passed. On 17 July 1649 the second Act declaring what offences shall be adjudged Treason was passed and it became treason to say that the House of Commons (without the Lords or the King) was not the supreme authority of the land.

== Content ==
The act purported to make the following things treason:

- to say in writing or verbally that "the [Commonwealth] government is tyrannical, usurped, or unlawful, or that the commons in parliament assembled are not the supreme authority of this nation",
- to "plot, contrive, or endeavour to stir up or raise force against the present government, or for the subversion or alteration of the same",
- to attempt or incite the subversion of the government, or insurrection against the government,
- to counterfeit the Commonwealth version of the great seal of England, or
- to counterfeit or clip coins, or import counterfeit coins (whether they were Commonwealth coins or foreign coins current within England).

It was also declared treason for any person who was not a member of the New Model Army:

- to plot or incite a mutiny,
- to "withdraw any soldiers or officers from their obedience to their superior officers, or from the present government",
- to "procure, invite, aid, or assist any foreigners or strangers to invade England or Ireland", or
- to "adhere to" the enemies of the Commonwealth parliament or government.

The act also stated that nobody could be prosecuted for treason unless they were indicted within one year of committing the offence.

The penalty for treason under the act was death and forfeiture of lands and goods, "as in case of high treason hath been used by the laws and statutes of this land". However, there was to be no corruption of blood for treason by counterfeiting coins (although corruption of blood had already been abolished for coinage offences by the Coin Act 1575) (18 Eliz. 1. c. 1).

== Legacy ==
Although the act ceased to have effect from 1660, the treason consisting of inviting foreigners to invade England or Ireland was soon copied in the Sedition Act 1661, which made it treason "to move or stirr any Foreiner or Strangers with force to invade this Realme or any other His Majesties Dominions or Countreys being under His Majesties Obeysance". Although no longer treason today, this remains an offence under the Treason Felony Act 1848, which makes it a crime punishable with life imprisonment "to move or stir any foreigner or stranger with force to invade the United Kingdom or any other of her Majesty's dominions or countries under the obeisance of her Majesty".

== See also ==
- High treason in the United Kingdom
- Treason Act
- List of ordinances and acts of the Parliament of England, 1642–1660
