= Irish Lunatic Asylums for the Poor Act 1817 =

Act of the Parliament of the United Kingdom

- Act of Parliament
- Parliament of Great Britain
- Long title: An Act to provide for the Establishment of Asylums for the Lunatic Poor in Ireland.
- Citation: 57 Geo. 3. c. 106
- Territorial extent: Ireland (Note: Section 1.)

Dates
- Royal assent: 11 July 1817
- Commencement: 11 July 1817
- Repealed: 7 June 1821
Other legislation
Amended by	Lunatic Asylums (Ireland) Act 1820
Repealed by	Lunacy (Ireland) Act 1821

Status: Repealed

Text of statute as originally enacted

The Irish Lunatic Asylums for the Poor Act 1817 (57 Geo. 3. c. 106) was an act of the Parliament of the United Kingdom. It made Ireland the first nation in the world to require a national system of publicly funded asylums (which were a major source of wealth for the economy and a large provider of jobs in many towns), before this expanded to the rest of the United Kingdom. It also constituted the first time that a national bureaucratic system had been established by colonial social welfare policy It led to the creation of a provincial asylum in each province.

== Background ==
The Report of the Select Committee to Consider the State of the Lunatic Poor in Ireland (1817) was the main influence toward the creation and subsequent passing of the bill.

== Subsequent developments ==
The whole act was repealed by section 1 of the Lunacy (Ireland) Act 1821 (1 & 2 Geo. 4. c. 33), which came into force on 7 June 1821.
