= Oaths, Land and Sea Forces Act 1817 =

Act of the Parliament of the United Kingdom

- Act of Parliament
- Parliament of the United Kingdom
- Long title: An Act to regulate the Administration of Oaths in certain cases to Officers in His Majesty's Land and Sea Forces.
- Citation: 57 Geo. 3. c. 92
- Territorial extent: United Kingdom

Dates
- Royal assent: 10 July 1817
- Commencement: 10 July 1817 (Note: Section 1.)
- Repealed: 13 July 1871
Other legislation
Repealed by	Promissory Oaths Act 1871

Status: Repealed

Text of statute as originally enacted

The Oaths, Land and Sea Forces Act 1817 (57 Geo. 3. c. 92) was an act of the Parliament of the United Kingdom. The act opened up all ranks in the Army and Navy to Roman Catholics and Dissenters.

== Subsequent developments ==
The whole act was repealed by section 1 of, and part I of schedule one to, the Promissory Oaths Act 1871 (34 & 35 Vict. c. 48), which came into force on 13 July 1871.
