= Seditious Meetings Act 1817 =

Act of the Parliament of the United Kingdom

Seditious Meetings Act 1817 (Note: The citation of this act by this short title was authorised by section 1 of, and the first schedule to, the Short Titles Act 1896. Due to the repeal of those provisions it is now authorised by section 19(2) of the Interpretation Act 1978.)
- Act of Parliament
- Parliament of the United Kingdom
- Long title: An Act for the more effectually preventing Seditious Meetings and Assemblies.
- Citation: 57 Geo. 3. c. 19
- Introduced by: Lord Castlereagh (Lords)
- Territorial extent: England and Wales; Scotland; (Note: Section 29.)

Dates
- Royal assent: 31 March 1817
- Commencement: 1 April 1817 (City of London); 7 April 1817 (Great Britain); (Note: Section 22.)
- Expired: 24 July 1818
- Repealed: 1 April 1987 (Note: The Public Order Act 1986 (Commencement No. 2) Order 1987 (SI 1987/198).)
Other legislation
Amended by	Seditious Meetings Act 1819; Criminal Statutes Repeal Act 1827; Criminal Statutes (Ireland) Repeal Act 1828; Criminal Law (India) Act 1828; Statute Law Revision Act 1873; Summary Jurisdiction Act 1884; Statute Law Revision Act 1887; Statute Law Revision Act 1888; Statute Law Revision Act 1890; Public Authorities Protection Act 1893; Justices of the Peace Act 1949
Repealed by	Public Order Act 1986
Relates to	Habeas Corpus Suspension Act 1817; Treason Act 1817

Status: Repealed

Text of statute as originally enacted

The Seditious Meetings Act 1817 (57 Geo. 3. c. 19) was an act of the Parliament of the United Kingdom that made it illegal to hold a meeting of more than 50 people.

== Provisions ==
The provisions of the act were similar to those of previous Seditious Meetings Acts, such as that of 1795, although more severe constraints were added. The law forbade all meetings of more than 50 people called "for the purpose...of deliberating upon any grievance, in church or state," unless the meeting had been summoned by an authorised official, or sufficient notice was provided by its organizers. In the latter case, the organizers were required at least five days prior to the meeting to either publicly advertise in a newspaper the time, place and purpose the event, or submit a notice to a clerk of the peace. The advertisement or notice needed to be signed by seven local persons, and a copy was to be forwarded to a justice of the peace.

Under the act, justices of the peace, sheriffs and other officials were authorised to attend any meetings held within their jurisdictions. In the event that the meeting was found to be unlawful, they could order its participants to disperse. Anyone who ignored such an order was to be found guilty of a felony without benefit of clergy and put to death.

Special restrictions were placed on meetings of more than 50 people in any public place in the City or Liberties of Westminster or Middlesex County which was within one mile of the gates or Westminster Hall. These were outright banned whenever Parliament or other state bodies were in session, unless the meeting was held at St. Paul's Covent Garden, or if the meeting was convened for the election of Members of Parliament.

The act also established regulations for places where lectures or debates were held, requiring these to be licensed and allowing officials to inspect them. Universities and certain other institutions, however, were excluded from these provisions.

The legislation also suppressed secret societies and clubs, banning any such organization whose members were required to take an oath not authorized by law. It explicitly targeted the Spencean Philanthropists, outlawing them and any other society that advocated the "confiscation and division of the land." These restrictions did not extend to the Freemasons and Quakers, who were granted exceptions under the act.

The regulations on assemblies and licensing requirements for public meetings took effect in London and the surrounding regions the day after its passage, and in the rest of the country after seven days. Ireland, however, was completely exempted from the terms of the act.

== Subsequent developments ==
The act was passed by Lord Liverpool's government in March 1817. Parliament had become concerned with a perceived rise in radical activities by groups such as the Hampden Clubs and the Spencean Philanthropists, and several recent incidents, such as the Spa Fields riots of December 1816, an attack on the Prince Regent in January 1817, and the march of the Blanketeers that March, prompted the enactment of the act.

Due to a sunset clause, sections 1 through 22 of the act (which dealt with seditious meetings in general and licensing requirements for places for public debates) automatically expired on 24 July 1818, although they were temporarily revived in altered form by the Seditious Meetings Act 1819 (60 Geo. 3 & 1 Geo. 4. c. 6). Section 23, which banned public meetings within a mile of the gates of Westminster Hall, was largely suspended by the 1819 act, but was reinstated after the latter's expiration in 1824; it was eventually fully repealed by section 40(3) of, and schedule 3 to, the Public Order Act 1986, which came into force on 1 April 1987.

Section 32 and 33 of the act was repealed by section 2 of, and the schedule to, the Public Authorities Protection Act 1893 (56 & 57 Vict. c. 61), which came into force on 1 January 1894.

The whole act was repealed by section 40(3) of, and schedule 3 to, the Public Order Act 1986, which came into force on 1 April 1987.

== See also ==
- Treason Act 1817
- Habeas Corpus Suspension Act 1817
- Sedition
