= Sedition Act =

Sedition Act may refer to:

- Alien and Sedition Acts, including the Sedition Act of 1798, laws passed by the United States Congress
- Sedition Act 1661 (13 Cha. 2 St. 1. c. 1), an English statute that largely relates to treason
- Sedition Act of 1918, also passed by the United States Congress
- Sedition Act 1948, a law in Malaysia
  - Sedition Act (Singapore), the same law extended to Singapore
- Section 124A of the Indian Penal Code, a law in India which lays down the punishment for sedition.
- Defence of India Act 1915 similar law during British rule in India.

== See also ==
- Sections 9 and 10 of the Crimes Ordinance (Cap. 200) and Division 4, Part 3 of the Safeguarding National Security Ordinance (Instrument A305) in Hong Kong
- List of short titles
