= Treason Act 1795 =

Act of the Parliament of Great Britain

Treason Act 1795 (Note: The citation of this act by this short title was authorised by section 1 of, and the first schedule to, the Short Titles Act 1896. Due to the repeal of those provisions it is now authorised by section 19(2) of the Interpretation Act 1978.)
- Act of Parliament
- Parliament of Great Britain
- Long title: An act for the Safety and preservation of his Majesty's person and government against treasonable and seditious practises and attempts.
- Citation: 36 Geo. 3. c. 7
- Territorial extent: Great Britain

Dates
- Royal assent: 18 December 1795
- Commencement: 18 December 1795 (Note: The Acts of Parliament (Commencement) Act 1793.)
- Repealed: 30 September 1998 (Note: The Crime and Disorder Act 1998 (Commencement No. 2 and Transitional Provisions) Order 1998 (SI 1998/2327).)
Other legislation
Amended by	Treason Act 1817; Treason Felony Act 1848; Statute Law Revision Act 1871; Statute Law Revision Act 1888; Statute Law Revision Act 1948
Repealed by	Crime and Disorder Act 1998
Relates to	Treason Act 1708; Seditious Meetings Act 1795; Treason (Ireland) Act 1821

Status: Repealed

Text of statute as originally enacted

Revised text of statute as amended

The Treason Act 1795 (36 Geo. 3. c. 7), sometimes also known as the Treasonable and Seditious Practices Act, was an act of the Parliament of Great Britain. The act was one of two acts introduced by the British government in the wake of the stoning of King George III on his way to open Parliament in 1795, the other being the Seditious Meetings Act 1795 (36 Geo. 3. c. 8). The act made it high treason to "within the realm or without compass, imagine, invent, devise or intend death or destruction, or any bodily harm tending to death or destruction, maim or wounding, imprisonment or restraint, of the person of ... the King". This was derived from the Sedition Act 1661 (13 Cha. 2 St. 1. c. 1), which had expired. The 1795 act was originally a temporary act which was to expire when George III died, but it was made permanent by the Treason Act 1817 (57 Geo. 3. c. 6).

Some other treasons created by the act (which also originated with the 1661 act) were reduced to felonies by the Treason Felony Act 1848 11 & 12 Vict. c. 12, which also extended the 1795 act to Ireland.

The act also stipulated that anyone found to have brought either the King, the Constitution or the government into contempt could be transported for a period of 7 years. This clause was repealed by the Statute Law Revision Act 1871.

A later perspective given on the context surrounding its passage:

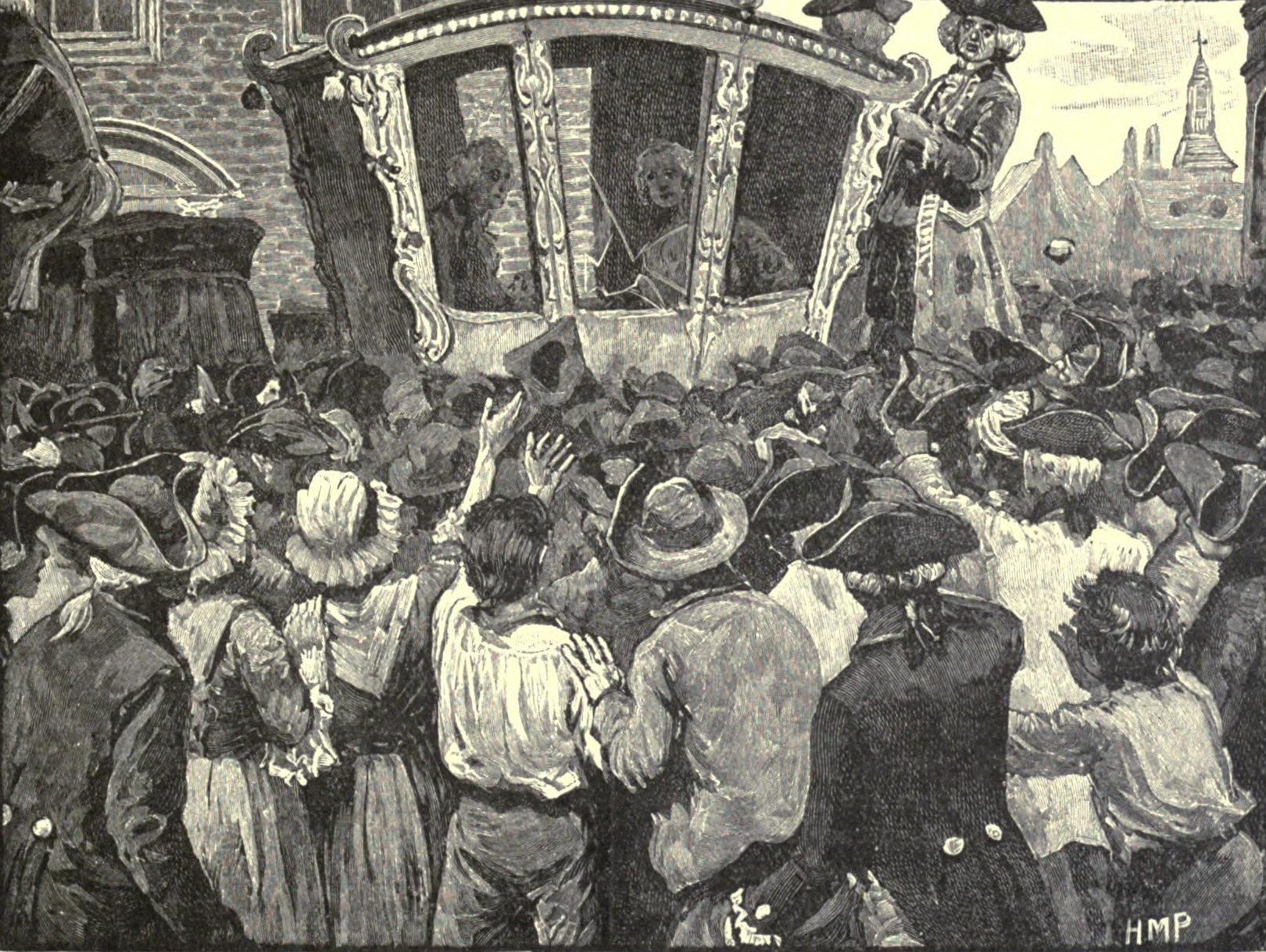
Attack on the royal carriage in 1795

"In the meantime, the supporters of Fox had been active in protesting against the attitude of the government. To offset this, so it is claimed, an incident was prearranged by the ministry which was calculated to arouse the indignation of loyal subjects of George III. While the king was on his way to attend the opening of Parliament on October 29, 1795, a riotous crowd assembled and stoned his carriage, breaking some panes of glass. The evidence is not altogether clear that this assault was not a premeditated affair, arranged with the knowledge of responsible ministers. As a result of the agitation following the incident, the Treasonable Practices Bill was passed on December 18, 1795. To this was coupled a Seditious Meetings Bill, aimed at the gatherings that Pitt had taken exception to. The government was thus thoroughly established in the position aimed at by Pitt, which position placed him personally in the height of his power."

— O.E. Hunt, "Review: England and the French Revolution, 1789-1797. By Wm. Thomas Laprade, Ph. D. (Baltimore). The Johns Hopkins Press. 1909.", Journal of the Military Service Institution of the United States (1910) pg. 545

Sections 2–9 of the act were repealed by section 1 of, and the schedule to, the Statute Law Revision Act 1871 (34 & 35 Vict. c. 116), which came into force on 21 August 1871.

The whole act was repealed by section 36(3)(b) and section 120(2) of, and schedule 10 to the Crime and Disorder Act 1998, which came into force on 30 September 1998. The 1998 act abolished the death penalty for treason.

== See also ==
- Seditious Meetings Act 1795
