= Seditious Meetings Act 1795 =

Act of the Parliament of Great Britain

- Act of Parliament
- Parliament of Great Britain
- Long title: An Act for the more effectually preventing Seditious Meetings and Assemblies.
- Citation: 36 Geo. 3. c. 8
- Territorial extent: Great Britain (Note: Section 40.)

Dates
- Royal assent: 18 December 1795
- Commencement: 19 December 1795 (City of London); 25 December 1795 (United Kingdom)
- Expired: 17 July 1799
- Repealed: 12 July 1869
Other legislation
Repealed by	Newspapers, Printers, and Reading Rooms Repeal Act 1869
Relates to	Treason Act 1795; Seditious Meetings Act 1817; Seditious Meetings Act 1819

Status: Repealed

Text of statute as originally enacted

The Seditious Meetings Act 1795 (36 Geo. 3. c. 8) was an act of the Parliament of Great Britain passed in December 1795; it had as its purpose was to restrict the size of public meetings to fifty persons.

It was the second of the well known "Two Acts" (also known as the "Gagging Acts" or the "Grenville and Pitt Bills"), the other being the Treason Act 1795 (36 Geo. 3. c. 7). It also required a magistrate's license for lecturing and debating halls where admission was charged and policies discussed.

== Background ==
In a period of revolution in Europe, the British Parliament attempted to avoid any seditious movement in the kingdoms. The period between 1790 and 1800 was one of intense lectures and public speeches in defence of political reformation, which, for the similarities with the French Revolution principles, were usually named "Jacobinic meetings". One of the most famous preachers in the period was John Thelwall, who interpreted the "Two Acts" as a violence against him and his teachings. His meetings used to reach a large number of people and, after the approval of the acts, were disturbed by many legalists who wished to see the law being respected. Similarly, there were many societies at the time with the intention of advocating for parliamentary reform. Specifically, they wanted Parliament to more equally represent the people instead of just the aristocracy. The Society of the Friends of the People is an example of this type of Society.

== Provisions ==
The act stated that any place, like a room or building, where political meetings took place, with the purpose of discussing the injustice of any law, constitution, government and policy of the kingdoms, must be declared a house of disorder and punished.

== Subsequent developments ==
As a result of the act, and other similar types of legislature, societies, like the Society of the Friends of the People, were forced to disband out of fear of arrest or execution.

This legislation was reasonably effective. However, provided that Jacobin alehouse clubs were restricted to fifty persons and avoided corresponding, they were able to dodge the Seditious Meetings Act. Also, actions against individuals for seditious, treasonous or blasphemous words was hindered as spies and shorthand writers could not easily transcribe undiscovered in such an environment. Alehouse debaters could convey anti-establishment sentiments in oblique ways that were difficult to prosecute in a law-court.

The whole act was repealed by section 1 of, and the first schedule to, the Newspapers, Printers, and Reading Rooms Repeal Act 1869 (32 & 33 Vict. c. 24), which came into force on 12 July 1869.

== See also ==
- Treason Act 1795
