= Habeas Corpus Suspension Act 1817 =

Act of the Parliament of the United Kingdom

- Act of Parliament
- Parliament of the United Kingdom
- Long title: An Act to empower His Majesty to secure and detain such Persons as His Majesty shall suspect are conspiring against His Person and Government.
- Citation: 57 Geo. 3 c. 3
- Territorial extent: Great Britain (Note: Section 1.)

Dates
- Royal assent: 4 March 1817
- Commencement: 4 March 1817 (Note: The Acts of Parliament (Commencement) Act 1793.)
- Expired: 1 July 1817
- Repealed: 5 August 1873
Other legislation
| Amended by | Habeas Corpus Suspension (No. 2) Act 1817 |
| Repealed by | Statute Law Revision Act 1873 |
| Relates to | Treason Act 1817; Seditious Meetings Act 1817; Habeas Corpus Suspension Act 1818 |

Status: Repealed

Text of statute as originally enacted

Habeas Corpus Suspension (No. 2) Act 1817
- Act of Parliament
- Parliament of the United Kingdom
- Long title: An Act to continue an Act to empower His Majesty to secure and detain such Persons as His Majesty shall suspect are conspiring against His Person and Government.
- Citation: 57 Geo. 3 c. 55
- Territorial extent: Great Britain

Dates
- Royal assent: 30 June 1817
- Commencement: 30 June 1817
- Expired: 1 March 1818
- Repealed: 31 January 1818
Other legislation
| Amends | Habeas Corpus Suspension Act 1817 |
| Repealed by | Habeas Corpus Suspension Act 1818 |

Status: Repealed

Text of statute as originally enacted

Habeas Corpus Suspension Act 1818
- Act of Parliament
- Parliament of the United Kingdom
- Long title: An Act to repeal an Act made in the last Session of Parliament, intituled An Act to continue an Act to empower His Majesty to secure and detain such Persons as His Majesty shall suspect are conspiring against His Person and Government.
- Citation: 58 Geo. 3. c. 1
- Territorial extent: United Kingdom

Dates
- Royal assent: 31 January 1818
- Commencement: 31 January 1818
- Repealed: 5 August 1873
Other legislation
| Repeals/revokes | Habeas Corpus Suspension (No. 2) Act 1817 |
| Repealed by | Statute Law Revision Act 1873 |
| Relates to | Habeas Corpus Suspension Act 1817 |

Status: Repealed

Text of statute as originally enacted

The Habeas Corpus Suspension Act 1817 (57 Geo. 3 c. 3) was an act of the Parliament of the United Kingdom.

The Home Secretary, Lord Sidmouth, introduced the second reading of the bill on 24 February 1817. In his speech he said there was "a traitorous conspiracy ... for the purpose of overthrowing ... the established government" and referred to "a malignant spirit which had brought such disgrace upon the domestic character of the people" and "had long prevailed in the country, but especially since the commencement of the French Revolution". This spirit belittled Britain's victories and exalted the prowess of her enemies and after the war had fomented discontent and encouraged violence: "An organised system has been established in every quarter, under the semblance of demanding parliamentary reform, but many of them, I am convinced, have that specious pretext in their mouths only, but revolution and rebellion in their hearts".

== Subsequent developments ==
The act was renewed later in the parliamentary session by the Habeas Corpus Suspension (No. 2) Act 1817 (57 Geo. 3 c. 55). In autumn 1817 Sidmouth went through the list of all those detained under the act and released as many as possible, personally interviewing most of the prisoners. He also tried to alleviate some of their conditions: "Solitary confinement will not be continued except under special circumstances". The act was repealed in February 1818 by the Habeas Corpus Suspension Act 1818 (58 Geo. 3 c. 1).

The whole act was repealed by section 1 of, and the schedule to, the Statute Law Revision Act 1873 (36 & 37 Vict. c. 91), which came into force on 5 August 1873.

== See also ==
- Habeas Corpus
- Habeas Corpus Suspension Act
- Treason Act 1817
- Seditious Meetings Act 1817

== Bibliography ==
- Ziegler, Philip (1965). Addington. A Life of Henry Addington, First Viscount Sidmouth. Collins.
