= Treason Act 1817 =

Act of the Parliament of the United Kingdom

Treason Act 1817 (Note: The citation of this act by this short title was authorised by section 1 of, and the first schedule to, the Short Titles Act 1896. Due to the repeal of those provisions it is now authorised by section 19(2) of the Interpretation Act 1978.)
- Act of Parliament
- Parliament of the United Kingdom
- Long title: An Act to make perpetual certain Parts of an Act of the Thirty-sixth Year of His present Majesty for the Safety and Preservation of His Majesty's Person [and Government] against Treasonable and Seditious Practices and Attempts [and for the Safety and Preservation of the Person of His Royal Highness The Prince Regent against Treasonable Practices and Attempts]. (Note: The words in brackets were repealed by the Statute Law Revision (No. 2) Act 1890.)
- Citation: 57 Geo. 3. c. 6
- Territorial extent: United Kingdom

Dates
- Royal assent: 17 March 1817
- Commencement: 17 March 1817 (Note: The Acts of Parliament (Commencement) Act 1793.)
- Repealed: 30 September 1998 (Note: The Crime and Disorder Act 1998 (Commencement No. 2 and Transitional Provisions) Order 1998 (SI 1998/2327).)
Other legislation
Amends	Treason Act 1795
Amended by	Habeas Corpus Suspension Act 1817; Seditious Meetings Act 1817; Treason Felony Act 1848; Statute Law Revision Act 1873; Statute Law Revision Act 1888; Statute Law Revision (No. 2) Act 1890; Statute Law Revision Act (Northern Ireland) 1954
Repealed by	Crime and Disorder Act 1998
Relates to	Treason Act 1695; Treason Act 1814; Habeas Corpus Suspension Act 1817; Seditious Meetings Act 1817; Treason (Ireland) Act 1821

Status: Repealed

Text of statute as originally enacted

Revised text of statute as amended

The Treason Act 1817 (57 Geo. 3. c. 6) was an act of the Parliament of the United Kingdom.

The act made it high treason to assassinate the Prince Regent. It also made permanent the Treason Act 1795 (36 Geo. 3. c. 7), which had been due to expire on the death of George III.

== Subsequent developments ==
The whole act, except as relates "to the compassing, imagining, inventing, devising, or intending Death or Destruction, or any bodily Harm tending to Death or Destruction, Maim or Wounding, Imprisonment or Restraint of the Person of the Heirs and Successors of His said Majesty King George the Third, and the expressing, uttering, or declaring of such Compassings, Imaginations, Inventions, Devices, or Intentions, or any of them", was repealed by section 1 of the Treason Felony Act 1848 (11 & 12 Vict. c. 12), which came into force on 22 April 1848.

Sections 2 and 3 of the act were repealed by section 1 of, and the schedule to, the Statute Law Revision Act 1873 (36 & 37 Vict. c. 91), which came into force on 5 August 1873.

The whole act was repealed by section 36(3)(a) and section 120(2) of, and schedule 10 to the Crime and Disorder Act 1998, which came into force on 30 September 1998. The 1998 act abolished the death penalty for treason.

== See also ==
- Seditious Meetings Act 1817
- Habeas Corpus Suspension Act 1817
- Treason Act
