= List of acts of the Parliament of the United Kingdom from 1817 =

This is a complete list of acts of the Parliament of the United Kingdom for the year 1817.

Note that the first parliament of the United Kingdom was held in 1801; parliaments between 1707 and 1800 were either parliaments of Great Britain or of Ireland). For acts passed up until 1707, see the list of acts of the Parliament of England and the list of acts of the Parliament of Scotland. For acts passed from 1707 to 1800, see the list of acts of the Parliament of Great Britain. See also the list of acts of the Parliament of Ireland.

For acts of the devolved parliaments and assemblies in the United Kingdom, see the list of acts of the Scottish Parliament, the list of acts of the Northern Ireland Assembly, and the list of acts and measures of Senedd Cymru; see also the list of acts of the Parliament of Northern Ireland.

The number shown after each act's title is its chapter number. Acts passed before 1963 are cited using this number, preceded by the year(s) of the reign during which the relevant parliamentary session was held; thus the Union with Ireland Act 1800 is cited as "39 & 40 Geo. 3 c. 67", meaning the 67th act passed during the session that started in the 39th year of the reign of George III and which finished in the 40th year of that reign. Note that the modern convention is to use Arabic numerals in citations (thus "41 Geo. 3" rather than "41 Geo. III"). Acts of the last session of the Parliament of Great Britain and the first session of the Parliament of the United Kingdom are both cited as "41 Geo. 3". Acts passed from 1963 onwards are simply cited by calendar year and chapter number.

All modern acts have a short title, e.g. "the Local Government Act 2003". Some earlier acts also have a short title given to them by later acts, such as by the Short Titles Act 1896.

== 57 Geo. 3 ==
The fifth session of the 5th Parliament of the United Kingdom, which met from 28 January 1817 until 12 July 1817.

This session was also traditionally cited as 57 G. 3.

=== Public general acts ===
Short title	Citation	Royal assent
Long title
Cape of Good Hope, etc. Trade Act 1817 (repealed)	57 Geo. 3. c. 1	24 February 1817
An act to continue and extend the Provisions of an Act of the Forty-ninth Year of His present Majesty, (Note: Cape of Good Hope Trade Act 1809 (49 Geo. 3. c. 17)) for regulating the Trade and Commerce to and from The Cape of Good Hope, until the Fifth Day of July One thousand eight hundred and twenty; and also for regulating the Trade of the Island of Mauritius. (Repealed by Statute Law Revision Act 1873 (36 & 37 Vict. c. 91))
Exchequer Bills Act 1817 (repealed)	57 Geo. 3. c. 2	24 February 1817
An Act for raising the Sum of Twenty-four Millions, by Exchequer Bills, for the Service of the Year One thousand eight hundred and seventeen. (Repealed by Statute Law Revision Act 1873 (36 & 37 Vict. c. 91))
Habeas Corpus Suspension Act 1817 or the Coercion Act 1817 (repealed)	57 Geo. 3. c. 3	4 March 1817
An Act to empower His Majesty to secure and detain such Persons as His Majesty shall suspect are conspiring against His Person and Government. (Repealed by Statute Law Revision Act 1873 (36 & 37 Vict. c. 91))
Gibraltar Trade Act 1817 (repealed)	57 Geo. 3. c. 4	4 March 1817
An Act to extend the Privileges of the Trade of Malta to the Port of Gibraltar. (Repealed by Trade Act (No. 2) 1822 (3 Geo. 4. c. 45))
Duties on Malt, etc. Act 1817 (repealed)	57 Geo. 3. c. 5	4 March 1817
An Act for continuing to His Majesty certain Duties on Malt, Sugar, Tobacco, and Snuff, in Great Britain; and on Pensions, Offices, and Personal Estates, in England; and for receiving the Contributions of Persons receiving Pensions and holding Offices; for the Service of the Year One thousand eight hundred and seventeen. (Repealed by Statute Law Revision Act 1873 (36 & 37 Vict. c. 91))
Treason Act 1817 (repealed)	57 Geo. 3. c. 6	17 March 1817
Act to make perpetual certain Parts of an Act of the Thirty-sixth Year of His present Majesty, (Note: Treason Act 1795 (36 Geo. 3. c. 7)) for the Safety and Preservation of His Majesty's Person and Government against Treasonable and Seditious Practices and Attempts; and for the Safety and Preservation of the Person of His Royal Highness The Prince Regent against Treasonable Practices and Attempts. (Repealed by Crime and Disorder Act 1998 (c. 37))
Allegiance of Sea and Land Forces Act 1817 (repealed)	57 Geo. 3. c. 7	17 March 1817
An act to revive and make perpetual Two Acts of the Thirty-seventh Year of His present Majesty, the one in the Parliament of Great Britain, (Note: Incitement to Mutiny Act 1797 (37 Geo. 3. c. 70)) and the other in the Parliament of Ireland, (Note: Incitement to Disaffection Act (Ireland) 1797 (37 Geo. 3. c. 40 (I))) for the better Prevention and Punishment of Attempts to seduce Persons serving in His Majesty's Forces by Sea or Land from their Duty and Allegiance to His Majesty, or to incite them to Mutiny or Disobedience. (Repealed by Statute Law Revision Act 1873 (36 & 37 Vict. c. 91))
Coffee, etc. Act 1817 (repealed)	57 Geo. 3. c. 8	17 March 1817
An Act to continue, until the Fifth Day of April One thousand eight hundred and twenty, an Act of the Fifty-second Year of His present Majesty, (Note: Coffee, etc. Act 1812 (52 Geo. 3. c. 149)) to regulate the Separation of damaged from sound Coffee, and to permit Dealers to send out any Quantity of Coffee not exceeding Eight Pounds Weight without Permit. (Repealed by Statute Law Revision Act 1873 (36 & 37 Vict. c. 91))
Comptroller of Barrack Department Act 1817 (repealed)	57 Geo. 3. c. 9	17 March 1817
An Act for vesting all Estates and Property occupied for the Barrack Service in the Comptroller of the Barrack Department; and for granting certain Powers to the said Comptroller. (Repealed by Statute Law Revision Act 1873 (36 & 37 Vict. c. 91))
Passenger Vessels Act 1817 (repealed)	57 Geo. 3. c. 10	17 March 1817
An Act to regulate the Vessels carrying Passengers from the United Kingdom to certain of His Majesty's Colonies in North America. (Repealed by Passenger Vessels Act 1823 (4 Geo. 4. c. 84))
Court of King's Bench Act 1817 (repealed)	57 Geo. 3. c. 11	17 March 1817
An Act to facilitate the Progress of Business in the Court of King's Bench in Westminster Hall. (Repealed by Statute Law Revision Act 1873 (36 & 37 Vict. c. 91))
Mutiny Act 1817 (repealed)	57 Geo. 3. c. 12	21 March 1817
An Act for punishing Mutiny and Desertion; and for the better Payment of the Army and their Quarters. (Repealed by Statute Law Revision Act 1873 (36 & 37 Vict. c. 91))
Marine Mutiny Act 1817 (repealed)	57 Geo. 3. c. 13	21 March 1817
An Act for the regulating of His Majesty's Royal Marine Forces while on Shore. (Repealed by Statute Law Revision Act 1873 (36 & 37 Vict. c. 91))
Indemnity Act 1817 (repealed)	57 Geo. 3. c. 14	21 March 1817
An Act to indemnify such Persons in the United Kingdom as have omitted to qualify themselves for Offices and Employments, and for extending the Time limited for those Purposes respectively until the Twenty-fifth Day of March One thousand eight hundred and eighteen; and to permit such Persons in Great Britain as have omitted to make and file Affidavits of the Execution of Indentures of Clerks to Attornies and Solicitors, to make and file the same on or before the first Day of Hilary Term One thousand eight hundred and eighteen. (Repealed by Promissory Oaths Act 1871 (34 & 35 Vict. c. 48))
Exportation Act 1817 (repealed)	57 Geo. 3. c. 15	21 March 1817
An Act to continue, until the Fifth Day of July One thousand eight hundred and eighteen, an Act of the Forty-sixth Year of His present Majesty, (Note: Bounty on Silk Manufactures Act 1806 (46 Geo. 3. c. 110)) for granting an additional Bounty on the Exportation of the Silk Manufactures of Great Britain. (Repealed by Statute Law Revision Act 1873 (36 & 37 Vict. c. 91))
Exchequer Bills (No. 2) Act 1817 (repealed)	57 Geo. 3. c. 16	29 March 1817
An Act for raising the Sum of Eighteen Millions, by Exchequer Bills, for the Service of the Year One thousand eight hundred and seventeen. (Repealed by Statute Law Revision Act 1873 (36 & 37 Vict. c. 91))
Exportation (No. 2) Act 1817 (repealed)	57 Geo. 3. c. 17	29 March 1817
An Act to repeal during the Continuance of Peace, so much of an Act of the Ninth Year of His present Majesty (Note: Customs, etc. Act 1769 (9 Geo. 3. c. 35)) as prohibits the Exportation of Pig and Bar Iron, and certain Naval Stores, unless the Preemption thereof be offered to the Commissioners of His Majesty's Navy. (Repealed by Statute Law Revision Act 1873 (36 & 37 Vict. c. 91))
Court of Exchequer (England) Act 1817 (repealed)	57 Geo. 3. c. 18	29 March 1817
An Act to facilitate the hearing and determining of Suits in Equity in His Majesty's Court of Exchequer at Westminster. (Repealed by Statute Law Revision Act 1861 (24 & 25 Vict. c. 101))
Seditious Meetings Act 1817 (repealed)	57 Geo. 3. c. 19	31 March 1817
An Act for the more effectually preventing Seditious Meetings and Assemblies. (Repealed by Public Order Act 1986 (c. 64))
Pay of Naval Officers Act 1817 (repealed)	57 Geo. 3. c. 20	31 March 1817
An Act for making further Regulations in respect to the Pay of the Officers of the Royal Navy, in certain cases therein mentioned. (Repealed by Pay of the Navy Act 1830 (11 Geo. 4 & 1 Will. 4. c. 20))
Arms (Ireland) Act 1817 (repealed)	57 Geo. 3. c. 21	29 April 1817
An Act to revive and continue for Two Years, and from thence until the End of the then next Session of Parliament, Two Acts made in the Forty-seventh (Note: Possession of Arms (Ireland) Act 1807 (47 Geo. 3 Sess. 2. c. 54)) and Fiftieth (Note: Arms (Ireland) Act 1810 (50 Geo. 3. c. 109)) Years of His present Majesty, for the preventing improper Persons from having Arms in Ireland. (Repealed by Statute Law Revision Act 1873 (36 & 37 Vict. c. 91))
Superintending Magistrates, etc. (Ireland) Act 1817 (repealed)	57 Geo. 3. c. 22	29 April 1817
An Act to amend Two Acts of the Fifty fourth (Note: Appointment of Superintending Magistrates, etc. Act 1814 (54 Geo. 3. c. 131)) and Fifty fifth (Note: Superintending Magistrates, etc. (Ireland) Act 1814 (55 Geo. 3. c. 13)) Years of His Majesty's Reign, to provide for the better Execution of the Laws in Ireland, by appointing Superintending Magistrates and additional Constables in Counties in certain cases. (Repealed by Constabulary (Ireland) Act 1836 (6 & 7 Will. 4. c. 13))
Importation Act 1817 (repealed)	57 Geo. 3. c. 23	29 April 1817
An Act to further continue, until the Twenty fifth Day of March One thousand eight hundred and twenty, an Act of the Seventh Year of King George the Second, (Note: Importation Act 1733 (7 Geo. 2. c. 18)) for the free Importation of Cochineal and Indigo. (Repealed by Statute Law Revision Act 1873 (36 & 37 Vict. c. 91))
Regents Park, Regent Street, etc. Act 1817	57 Geo. 3. c. 24	23 May 1817
An Act to alter and enlarge the Powers of an Act, passed in the Fifty fourth Year of His present Majesty, intituled "An Act for the further Improvement of the Land Revenue of the Crown." (Note: Crown Lands Act 1814 (54 Geo. 3. c. 70))
House Tax Act 1817 (repealed)	57 Geo. 3. c. 25	23 May 1817
An act to explain and amend an Act, made in the Forty eighth Year of His present Majesty, (Note: House Tax Act 1808 (48 Geo. 3. c. 55)) for repealing the Duties of Assessed Taxes, and granting new Duties in lieu thereof; and to exempt such Dwelling Houses as may be employed for the sole Purpose of Trade, or of lodging Goods, Wares or Merchandize, from the Duties charged by the said Act. (Repealed by Finance Act 1924 (14 & 15 Geo. 5. c. 21))
National Debt Commissioners Act 1817 (repealed)	57 Geo. 3. c. 26	23 May 1817
An Act to amend and render more effectual Four several Acts passed in the Forty eighth, (Note: Life Annuities Act 1808 (48 Geo. 3. c. 142)) Forty ninth, (Note: Reduction of National Debt Act 1809 (49 Geo. 3. c. 64)) Fifty second (Note: National Debt Commissioners Act 1812 (52 Geo. 3. c. 129)) and Fifty sixth (Note: National Debt Commissioners Act 1816 (56 Geo. 3. c. 53)) Years of His present Majesty, for enabling the Commissioners for the Reduction of the National Debt to grant Life Annuities. (Repealed by Statute Law Revision Act 1873 (36 & 37 Vict. c. 91))
Duties on Buckwheat Act 1817 (repealed)	57 Geo. 3. c. 27	23 May 1817
An Act for repealing the Duties of Customs on Buck Wheat imported into this Kingdom, and for granting other Duties until the Twenty fifth Day of March One thousand eight hundred and twenty one, in lieu thereof. (Repealed by Statute Law Revision Act 1873 (36 & 37 Vict. c. 91))
Trade Between Bermuda and America Act 1817 (repealed)	57 Geo. 3. c. 28	23 May 1817
An Act to extend the Powers of Two Acts, (Note: Importation and Exportation (No. 2) Act 1812 (52 Geo. 3. c. 79)) (Note: Bermuda Trade Act 1813 (53 Geo. 3. c. 50)) for allowing British Plantation Sugar and Coffee, and other Articles imported into Bermuda in British Ships, to be exported to America in Foreign Vessels, and to permit Articles, the Produce of America, to be imported into the said Island in Foreign Ships, to certain other Articles. (Repealed by Trade Act 1822 (3 Geo. 4. c. 44))
Trade, America, etc. Act 1817 (repealed)	57 Geo. 3. c. 29	23 May 1817
An Act to extend to Newfoundland the Provisions of an Act passed in the Fifty second Year of His present Majesty's Reign, (Note: Trade of West Indies Act 1812 (52 Geo. 3. c. 100)) for permitting the Exportation of Wares, Goods and Merchandize from any of His Majesty's Islands in the West Indies, to any other of the said Islands, and to and from any of the British Colonies on the Continent of America, and the said Islands and Colonies. (Repealed by Customs Law Repeal Act 1825 (6 Geo. 4. c. 105))
Navy, etc. Bills Act 1817 (repealed)	57 Geo. 3. c. 30	23 May 1817
An Act to regulate the Interests and Periods of Payment of Navy, Victualling and Transport Bills. (Repealed by Statute Law Revision Act 1861 (24 & 25 Vict. c. 101))
Lotteries Act 1817 (repealed)	57 Geo. 3. c. 31	23 May 1817
An Act for granting to His Majesty a Sum of Money to be raised by Lotteries. (Repealed by Statute Law Revision Act 1873 (36 & 37 Vict. c. 91))
Duties on Stone Bottles Act 1817 (repealed)	57 Geo. 3. c. 32	16 June 1817
An Act to repeal the Duties of Excise on Stone Bottles, and charge other Duties in lieu thereof. (Repealed by Statute Law Revision Act 1861 (24 & 25 Vict. c. 101))
Duties on Spirits, etc. Act 1817 (repealed)	57 Geo. 3. c. 33	16 June 1817
An Act to reduce the Allowance of Spirits, Tea and Tobacco for the Use of the Seamen on board certain Ships or Vessels making short Voyages. (Repealed by Customs Law Repeal Act 1825 (6 Geo. 4. c. 105))
Public Works Loans Act 1817 or the Poor Employment Act 1817 (repealed)	57 Geo. 3. c. 34	16 June 1817
An Act to authorize the Issue of Exchequer Bills, and the Advance of Money out of the Consolidated Fund, to a limited Amount, for the carrying on of Public Works and Fisheries in the United Kingdom, and Employment of the Poor in Great Britain, in manner therein mentioned. (Repealed by Public Works Loans Act 1875 (38 & 39 Vict. c. 89))
Mutiny (No. 2) Act 1817 (repealed)	57 Geo. 3. c. 35	20 June 1817
An Act for punishing Mutiny and Desertion; and for the better Payment of the Army and their Quarters. (Repealed by Statute Law Revision Act 1873 (36 & 37 Vict. c. 91))
Trade, East Indies and Mediterranean Act 1817 (repealed)	57 Geo. 3. c. 36	20 June 1817
An Act to regulate the Trade to and from the Places within the Limits of the Charter of the East India Company, and certain Possessions of His Majesty in the Mediterranean. (Repealed by Lascars Act 1823 (4 Geo. 4. c. 80))
Turnpike Roads Act 1817 (repealed)	57 Geo. 3. c. 37	20 June 1817
An Act to explain and amend an Act of the Fifty third Year of His present Majesty; relating to Tolls on Carriages used in Husbandry, and to remove Doubts as to Exemption of Carriages, not wholly laden with Manure, from Payment of Toll. (Repealed by Turnpike Roads Act 1822 (3 Geo. 4. c. 126))
Peace Preservation Act 1817 (repealed)	57 Geo. 3. c. 38	20 June 1817
An Act to continue until the Fifteenth Day of June One thousand eight hundred and eighteen, an Act of the Fifty second Year of His present Majesty, (Note: Preservation of the Peace Act 1812 (52 Geo. 3. c. 17)) for the more effectual Preservation of the Peace, by enforcing the Duties of Watching and Warding. (Repealed by Statute Law Revision Act 1873 (36 & 37 Vict. c. 91))
Charities, etc. (England) Act 1817 (repealed)	57 Geo. 3. c. 39	20 June 1817
An Act to extend certain Provisions of the Acts of the Thirty sixth (Note: Bank of England Stock Act 1796 (36 Geo. 3. c. 90)) and Fifty second (Note: Relief as to Transferable Stocks, etc. Act 1812 (52 Geo. 3. c. 158)) Years of the Reign of His present Majesty to Matters of Charity and Friendly Societies. (Repealed by Infants, Lunatics, etc. Act 1825 (6 Geo. 4. c. 74))
Distillation (Scotland) Act 1817 (repealed)	57 Geo. 3. c. 40	20 June 1817
An Act to authorize the rewarding Officers of the Customs for their Services in preventing illicit Distillation in Scotland, under an Act passed in the last Session of Parliament. (Note: Duties on Spirits, etc. (Scotland) Act 1816 (56 Geo. 3. c. 106)) (Repealed by Statute Law Revision Act 1873 (36 & 37 Vict. c. 91))
Paymaster General Act 1817 (repealed)	57 Geo. 3. c. 41	20 June 1817
An Act to repeal Two Acts passed in the Fifty fourth (Note: Office of Agent General for Volunteers, etc. Act 1814 (54 Geo. 3. c. 151)) and Fifty fifth (Note: Agent General for Volunteers, etc. Act 1815 (55 Geo. 3. c. 170)) Years of His present Majesty relating to the Office of the Agent General and for transferring the Duties of the said Office to the Offices of the Paymaster General and Secretary at War. (Repealed by Statute Law Revision Act 1873 (36 & 37 Vict. c. 91), Statute Law Revision Act 1888 (51 & 52 Vict. c. 3), Statute Law Revision Act 1890 (53 & 54 Vict. c. 33), Stamp Act 1891 (54 & 55 Vict. c. 39) and Defence (Transfer of Functions) (No. 1) Order 1964 (SI 1964/488))
Exportation from the Bahamas Act 1817 (repealed)	57 Geo. 3. c. 42	27 June 1817
An Act to revive and continue, until the Twenty fifth Day of March One thousand eight hundred and nineteen, an Act made in the Forty fourth Year of His present Majesty, (Note: Exportation (No. 3) Act 1804 (44 Geo. 3. c. 101)) for permitting the Exportation of Salt from the Port of Nassau in the Island of New Providence, the Port of Exuma and the Port of Crooked Island in the Bahama Islands, in American Ships coming in Ballast. (Repealed by Statute Law Revision Act 1873 (36 & 37 Vict. c. 91))
Bounties on Sugar Act 1817 (repealed)	57 Geo. 3. c. 43	27 June 1817
An Act for granting, for Two Years, from the Fifth Day of July One thousand eight hundred and seventeen, Bounties on Sugar refined otherwise than by Claying. (Repealed by Statute Law Revision Act 1873 (36 & 37 Vict. c. 91))
Yeomanry Act 1817 (repealed)	57 Geo. 3. c. 44	27 June 1817
An act to allow Corps of Yeomanry or Volunteer Cavalry, when assembled for the Suppression of Riots or Tumults, to be quartered and billetted, and Officers on Half Pay to hold certain Commissions in such Corps, and to exempt Members in such Corps from serving the Office of Constable. (Repealed by Territorial Army and Militia Act 1921 (11 & 12 Geo. 5. c. 37))
Continuation of Persons in Offices, etc. Act 1817 (repealed)	57 Geo. 3. c. 45	27 June 1817
An Act for the Continuation of all and every Person or Persons in any and every Office, Place or Employment, Civil or Military, within the United Kingdom of Great Britain and Ireland, Dominion of Wales, Town of Berwick upon Tweed, Isles of Jersey, Guernsey, Alderney, Sarke and Man, and also in all and every of His Majesty's Foreign Possessions, Colonies or Plantations, which he or she shall hold, possess or exercise during the Pleasure of the Crown, at the time of the Death or Demise of His present Majesty, until removed or discharged therefrom by the succeeding King or Queen of this Realm. (Repealed by Statute Law Revision Act 1873 (36 & 37 Vict. c. 91))
Tokens Act 1817 (repealed)	57 Geo. 3. c. 46	27 June 1817
An Act to prevent the issuing and circulating of Pieces of Cop per or other Metal, usually called Tokens. (Repealed by Coinage Act 1870 (33 & 34 Vict. c. 10))
Annuity to Lord Colchester, etc. Act 1817 (repealed)	57 Geo. 3. c. 47	27 June 1817
An Act for settling and securing Annuities on Lord Colchester, and on the next Person to whom the Title of Lord Colchester shall descend, in Consideration of his eminent Services. (Repealed by Statute Law Revision Act 1873 (36 & 37 Vict. c. 91))
Consolidated Fund, etc. Act 1817 (repealed)	57 Geo. 3. c. 48	27 June 1817
An Act to make further Provision for the Adjustment of the Accounts of the Consolidated Fund of the United Kingdom, and for making good any occasional Deficiency which may arise in the said Fund in Great Britain or Ireland respectively; and to direct the Application of Monies by the Commissioners for the Reduction of the National Debt. (Repealed by Exchequer and Audit Departments Act 1866 (29 & 30 Vict. c. 39))
Excise Act 1817 (repealed)	57 Geo. 3. c. 49	27 June 1817
An Act for altering and amending the Laws of Excise with respect to Salt and Rock Salt. (Repealed by Statute Law Revision Act 1861 (24 & 25 Vict. c. 101))
Peace Preservation (Ireland) Act 1817 (repealed)	57 Geo. 3. c. 50	27 June 1817
An Act to continue an Act made in the Fifty-fourth Year of His present Majesty's Reign, intituled, "An Act to provide for the preserving and restoring of Peace in such Parts of Ireland as may at any time be disturbed by seditious Persons, or by Persons entering into unlawful Combinations or Conspiracies." (Note: Unlawful Combinations (Ireland) Act 1814 (54 Geo. 3. c. 180)) (Repealed by Statute Law Revision Act 1873 (36 & 37 Vict. c. 91))
Marriages, Newfoundland Act 1817 (repealed)	57 Geo. 3. c. 51	27 June 1817
An Act to regulate the Celebration of Marriages in Newfoundland. (Repealed by Statute Law Revision Act 1861 (24 & 25 Vict. c. 101))
Deserted Tenements Act 1817 (repealed)	57 Geo. 3. c. 52	27 June 1817
An Act to alter an Act passed in the Eleventh Year of the Reign of King George the Second, (Note: Distress for Rent Act 1737 (11 Geo. 2. c. 19)) for the more effectual securing the Payment of Rents, and preventing Frauds by Tenants. (Repealed by Tribunals, Courts and Enforcement Act 2007 (c. 15))
Murders Abroad Act 1817 (repealed)	57 Geo. 3. c. 53	27 June 1817
An Act for the more effectual Punishment of Murders and Manslaughters committed in Places not within His Majesty's Dominions. (Repealed for England and Wales by Criminal Law Act 1967 (c. 58), for Northern Ireland by Criminal Law Act (Northern Ireland) 1967 (c. 18 (N.I.)) and for Scotland by Statute Law (Repeals) Act 1981 (c. 19))
Road to Millbank Prison Act 1817	57 Geo. 3. c. 54	27 June 1817
An Act to enable the Commissioners of His Majesty's Woods, Forests and Land Revenues to make and maintain a Road from Millbank Row, Westminster, to the Penitentiary.
Habeas Corpus Suspension (No. 2) Act 1817 (repealed)	57 Geo. 3. c. 55	30 June 1817
An Act to continue an Act (Note: Habeas Corpus Suspension Act 1817 (57 Geo. 3. c. 3)) to empower His Majesty to secure and detain such Persons as His Majesty shall suspect are conspiring against His Person and Government. (Repealed by Habeas Corpus Suspension Act 1818 (58 Geo. 3. c. 1))
Recognisances (Ireland) Act 1817 or the Recognizances (Ireland) Act 1817 (repealed)	57 Geo. 3. c. 56	30 June 1817
An Act to amend the Laws in respect to forfeited Recognizances in Ireland. (Repealed by Judicature (Northern Ireland) Act 1978 (c. 23))
Militia Act 1817 (repealed)	57 Geo. 3. c. 57	30 June 1817
An Act to empower His Majesty to suspend Training and to regulate the Quotas of the Militia. (Repealed by Militia (Voluntary Enlistment) Act 1875 (38 & 39 Vict. c. 69))
Exportation (No. 3) Act 1817 (repealed)	57 Geo. 3. c. 58	30 June 1817
An Act to allow British Goods to be exported direct from this Country to the United States of America upon the same Terms as when exported to any Foreign Country. (Repealed by Customs Law Repeal Act 1825 (6 Geo. 4. c. 105))
Post Horse Duties Act 1817 (repealed)	57 Geo. 3. c. 59	30 June 1817
An Act for letting to Farm the Post Horse Duties and for better securing and facilitating the Recovery of the said Duties. (Repealed by Duties on Horses Act 1823 (4 Geo. 4. c. 62))
Court of Exchequer Act 1817 (repealed)	57 Geo. 3. c. 60	7 July 1817
An Act to regulate certain Offices in the Court of Exchequer in England. (Repealed by Statute Law Revision Act 1873 (36 & 37 Vict. c. 91))
Abolition of Certain Officers of Royal Forests Act 1817 (repealed)	57 Geo. 3. c. 61	7 July 1817
An Act to abolish the Offices of the Wardens, Chief Justices and Justices in Eyre, North and South of Trent. (Repealed by Statute Law Revision Act 1861 (24 & 25 Vict. c. 101))
Public Offices (Ireland) Act 1817 (repealed)	57 Geo. 3. c. 62	7 July 1817
An Act to abolish certain Offices, and to regulate certain other Offices in Ireland. (Repealed by Statute Law Revision Act 1890 (53 & 54 Vict. c. 33) and Statute Law Revision Act 1953 (2 & 3 Eliz. 2. c. 5))
Offices of Clerks of the Signet, etc. Act 1817 (repealed)	57 Geo. 3. c. 63	7 July 1817
An Act to regulate the Offices of Clerks of the Signet and Privy Seal. (Repealed by Statute Law Revision Act 1861 (24 & 25 Vict. c. 101))
Public Offices (Scotland) Act 1817	57 Geo. 3. c. 64	7 July 1817
An Act to abolish certain Offices, and regulate others in Scotland.
Civil Service Pensions Act 1817 (repealed)	57 Geo. 3. c. 65	7 July 1817
An Act to enable His Majesty to recompense the Services of Persons holding, or who have held, certain high and efficient Civil Offices. (Repealed by Political Offices Pension Act 1869 (32 & 33 Vict. c. 60))
Board of Trade Act 1817 (repealed)	57 Geo. 3. c. 66	7 July 1817
An Act to amend an Act of the Twenty second Year of His present Majesty, (Note: Civil List and Secret Service Money Act 1782 (22 Geo. 3. c. 82)) for suppressing or regulating certain Offices therein mentioned, so far as relates to the Board of Trade; and for enabling the Vice President of the Board of Trade to send and receive Letters and Packets free from the Duty of Postage. (Repealed by Post Office (Repeal of Laws) Act 1837 (7 Will. 4 & 1 Vict. c. 32) and Board of Trade (Parliamentary Secretary) Act 1867 (30 & 31 Vict. c. 72))
Mint Act 1817 (repealed)	57 Geo. 3. c. 67	7 July 1817
An Act to regulate certain Offices in, and abolish others, in His Majesty's Mints in England and Scotland respectively. (Repealed by Coinage Act 1870 (33 & 34 Vict. c. 10))
Sheriffs (Ireland) Act 1817 (repealed)	57 Geo. 3. c. 68	7 July 1817
An Act to amend the Laws relating to Sheriffs in Ireland. (Repealed by Judgments (Enforcement) Act (Northern Ireland) 1969 (c. 30 (N.I.)))
Sea Fisheries (Ireland) Act 1817 (repealed)	57 Geo. 3. c. 69	7 July 1817
An Act to continue until the Twenty-ninth Day of September One thousand eight hundred and eighteen, and to amend an Act passed in Ireland, in the Thirty sixth Year of His present Majesty, (Note: Sea Fisheries Act 1796 (36 Geo. 3. c. 52 (I))) for the Improvement and Extension of the Fisheries on the Coasts of Ireland. (Repealed by Statute Law Revision Act 1873 (36 & 37 Vict. c. 91))
Dissenters (Ireland) Act 1817 (repealed)	57 Geo. 3. c. 70	7 July 1817
An Act to relieve Persons impugning the Doctrine of the Holy Trinity from certain Penalties, in Ireland. (Repealed by Statute Law Revision Act 1873 (36 & 37 Vict. c. 91) and Statute Law Revision Act (Northern Ireland) 1954 (c. 35 (N.I.)))
Prisoners (Ireland) Act 1817 (repealed)	57 Geo. 3. c. 71	7 July 1817
An Act to amend an Act of the Fiftieth Year of His present Majesty's Reign, (Note: Prisons (Ireland) Act 1810 (50 Geo. 3. c. 103)) for repealing the several Laws relating to Prisons in Ireland, and for reenacting such of the Provisions thereof as have been found usual with Amendments. (Repealed by Prisons (Ireland) Act 1826 (7 Geo. 4. c. 74))
Trade in Spirits Act 1817 (repealed)	57 Geo. 3. c. 72	7 July 1817
An Act to continue until the End of the next Session of Parliament Two Acts made in the Fifty fourth (Note: Spirit Trade Act 1814 (54 Geo. 3. c. 149)) and Fifty sixth (Note: Trade in Spirits Act 1816 (56 Geo. 3. c. 105)) Years of His present Majesty, for regulating the Trade in Spirits between Great Britain and Ireland reciprocally. (Repealed by Statute Law Revision Act 1873 (36 & 37 Vict. c. 91))
Exportation (No. 4) Act 1817 (repealed)	57 Geo. 3. c. 73	7 July 1817
An Act to allow the Exportation of Woollen or Bay Yarn from Ireland by Licence obtained there. (Repealed by Customs Law Repeal Act 1825 (6 Geo. 4. c. 105))
Jamaica, etc., Trade Act 1817 (repealed)	57 Geo. 3. c. 74	7 July 1817
An Act to extend several Acts for allowing the Importation and Exportation of certain Goods and Merchandize to Porta Maria in the Island of Jamaica, and to the Port of Bridge Town in the Island of Barbadoes. (Repealed by Trade Act 1822 (3 Geo. 4. c. 44))
Whipping of Female Offenders, Abolition Act 1817 (repealed)	57 Geo. 3. c. 75	7 July 1817
An Act to abolish the Punishment of Public Whipping on Female Offenders. (Repealed by Whipping Act 1820 (1 Geo. 4. c. 57))
Drawback on Paper Act 1817 (repealed)	57 Geo. 3. c. 76	7 July 1817
An Act to amend an Act of the Fifty-fourth Year of His present Majesty, (Note: Drawback on Paper Act 1814 (54 Geo. 3. c. 153)) to regulate the Payment of Drawback on Paper allowed to the Universities in Scotland. (Repealed by Statute Law Revision Act 1861 (24 & 25 Vict. c. 101))
Army Prize Money, etc. Act 1817 (repealed)	57 Geo. 3. c. 77	7 July 1817
An Act for extending the Provisions of an Act of the Fifty-fourth Year of His present Majesty, (Note: Army Prize Money Act 1814 (54 Geo. 3. c. 86)) for regulating the Payment of Army Prize Money; and for authorizing the Commissioners of Chelsea Hospital to suspend the Pensions of such Persons as shall be guilty of Frauds in respect of Prize Money or Pensions. (Repealed by Chelsea and Kilmainham Hospitals Act 1826 (7 Geo. 4. c. 16) and Army Prize Money Act 1832 (2 & 3 Will. 4. c. 53))
Quartering of Soldiers Act 1817 (repealed)	57 Geo. 3. c. 78	7 July 1817
An Act for fixing the Rates of Subsistence to be paid to Innkeepers and others on quartering Soldiers. (Repealed by Statute Law Revision Act 1873 (36 & 37 Vict. c. 91))
Transfer of Stocks Act 1817 (repealed)	57 Geo. 3. c. 79	7 July 1817
An Act to permit the Transfer of Capital from certain Public Stocks or Funds in Great Britain to certain Public Stocks or Funds in Ireland. (Repealed by Statute Law Revision Act 1861 (24 & 25 Vict. c. 101))
Exchequer Bills (No. 3) Act 1817 (repealed)	57 Geo. 3. c. 80	10 July 1817
An Act for raising the Sum of Nine Millions, by Exchequer Bills, for the Service of the Year One thousand eight hundred and seventeen. (Repealed by Statute Law Revision Act 1873 (36 & 37 Vict. c. 91))
Treasury Bills (Ireland) Act 1817 (repealed)	57 Geo. 3. c. 81	10 July 1817
An Act for raising the Sum of Three Millions six hundred thousand Pounds British Currency, by Treasury Bills, in Ireland, for the Services of the Year One thousand eight hundred and seventeen. (Repealed by Statute Law Revision Act 1873 (36 & 37 Vict. c. 91))
National Debt Act 1817 (repealed)	57 Geo. 3. c. 82	10 July 1817
An Act to continue an Act passed in Ireland in the Thirteenth and Fourteenth Years of His present Majesty, (Note: Annuities (No. 2) Act 1773 (13 & 14 Geo. 3. c. 7 (I))) respecting certain Annuities, so long as the said Annuities shall be payable. (Repealed by Statute Law Revision Act 1870 (33 & 34 Vict. c. 69))
National Debt (No. 2) Act 1817 (repealed)	57 Geo. 3. c. 83	10 July 1817
An Act to amend an Act, made in the last Session of Parliament, (Note: National Debt Reduction (No. 2) Act 1816 (56 Geo. 3. c. 89)) for providing for the Charge of certain Additions to the Public Debt of Ireland. (Repealed by Statute Law Revision Act 1870 (33 & 34 Vict. c. 69))
Offices of Exchequer Act 1817 (repealed)	57 Geo. 3. c. 84	10 July 1817
An Act to regulate the Offices of His Majesty's Exchequer in England and Ireland respectively. (Repealed by Statute Law Revision Act 1873 (36 & 37 Vict. c. 91))
Importation (No. 2) Act 1817 (repealed)	57 Geo. 3. c. 85	10 July 1817
An Act to permit until the Fourteenth Day of November One thousand eight hundred and seventeen, the Importation of Corn and other Articles in any Ship and from any Country; to permit such Articles which may have been warehoused for Exportation only to be entered for Home Consumption; and for indemnifying all Persons who have given Directions for the Importation of Corn and other Articles, or the taking the same out of Warehouse free of Duty, and who have acted in obedience thereto. (Repealed by Statute Law Revision Act 1873 (36 & 37 Vict. c. 91))
Importation (No. 3) Act 1817 (repealed)	57 Geo. 3. c. 86	10 July 1817
An Act to permit the Importation of Foreign Cambricks and Lawns into Ireland, on Payment of the like Duties as are chargeable in Great Britain. (Repealed by Statute Law Revision Act 1861 (24 & 25 Vict. c. 101))
Excise Drawback Act 1817 (repealed)	57 Geo. 3. c. 87	10 July 1817
An Act to amend Two Acts passed in the forty-fifth year of his present Majesty, (Note: Smuggling Act 1805 (45 Geo. 3. c. 121)) and in the last Session of Parliament, (Note: Excise (No. 2) Act 1816 (56 Geo. 3. c. 104)) for the making more effectual provision for the Prevention of Smuggling. (Repealed by Customs and Excise Act 1952 (15 & 16 Geo. 6 & 1 Eliz. 2. c. 44))
Fullers Earth, etc. Act 1817 (repealed)	57 Geo. 3. c. 88	10 July 1817
An Act to permit Fuller's Earth, Fulling Clay and Tobacco Pipe Clay, to be carried Coastwise under certain Restrictions. (Repealed by Statute Law Revision Act 1861 (24 & 25 Vict. c. 101))
Importation (No. 4) Act 1817 (repealed)	57 Geo. 3. c. 89	10 July 1817
An Act to allow the Importation of Oranges and Lemons from the Azores and the Madeiras into the British Colonies in North America. (Repealed by Trade Act (No. 2) 1822 (3 Geo. 4. c. 45))
Night Poaching Act 1817 (repealed)	57 Geo. 3. c. 90	10 July 1817
An Act for the Prevention of Persons going armed by Night for the Destruction of Game; and for repealing an Act, made in the last Session of Parliament, (Note: Night Poaching Act 1816 (56 Geo. 3. c. 130)) relating to Rogues and Vagabonds. (Repealed by Night Poaching Act 1828 (9 Geo. 4. c. 69))
Clerks of the Peace (Fees) Act 1817 (repealed)	57 Geo. 3. c. 91	10 July 1817
An Act to enable Justices of the Peace to settle the Fees to be taken by the Clerks of the Peace of the respective Counties and other Divisions of England and Wales. (Repealed by Courts Act 1971 (c. 23))
Oaths, Land and Sea Forces Act 1817 (repealed)	57 Geo. 3. c. 92	10 July 1817
An Act to regulate the Administration of Oaths in certain cases to Officers in His Majesty's Land and Sea Forces. (Repealed by Promissory Oaths Act 1871 (34 & 35 Vict. c. 48))
Distress (Costs) Act 1817 (repealed)	57 Geo. 3. c. 93	10 July 1817
An Act to regulate the Costs of Distresses levied for Payment of Small Rents. (Repealed by Statute Law (Repeals) Act 1995 (c. 44))
County Rates (England) Act 1817 (repealed)	57 Geo. 3. c. 94	10 July 1817
An Act to amend an Act of the last Session of Parliament, (Note: County Rates Act 1816 (56 Geo. 3. c. 49)) for the more easy assessing of County Rates. (Repealed by Middlesex County Rates Act 1831 (1 Will. 4. c. xlviii) and County Rates Act 1852 (15 & 16 Vict. c. 81))
Navigation Laws Act 1817 (repealed)	57 Geo. 3. c. 95	10 July 1817
An Act to exempt the Territories within the Limits of the East India Company's Charter from certain of the Navigation Laws. (Repealed by Customs Law Repeal Act 1825 (6 Geo. 4. c. 105))
Duties on Coals, etc. Act 1817 (repealed)	57 Geo. 3. c. 96	10 July 1817
An Act for suspending, until the First Day of August One thousand eight hundred and twenty, the Duties on Coals and Culm removed Coastwise within the Principality of Wales, and granting other Duties in lieu thereof. (Repealed by Statute Law Revision Act 1861 (24 & 25 Vict. c. 101))
Duchy of Lancaster Act 1817	57 Geo. 3. c. 97	10 July 1817
An Act for ratifying Articles of Agreement entered into by the Right Honourable Henry Hall Viscount Gage, and the Commissioners of His Majesty’s Woods, Forests, and Land Revenues; and for the better Management and Improvement of the Land Revenues of the Crown.
Saint Marylebone Rectory, Purchase of Act 1817	57 Geo. 3. c. 98	10 July 1817
An Act for ratifying the Purchase of the Impropriate Rectory of Saint Mary le bone in the County of Middlesex.
Residence on Benefices, etc. (England) Act 1817 (repealed)	57 Geo. 3. c. 99	10 July 1817
An Act to consolidate and amend the Laws relating to Spiritual Persons holding of Farms; and for enforcing the Residence of Spiritual Persons on their Benefices; and for the Support and Maintenance of Stipendiary Curates in England. (Repealed by Pluralities Act 1838 (1 & 2 Vict. c. 106))
Land Tax Redemption Act 1817 (repealed)	57 Geo. 3. c. 100	10 July 1817
An Act to renew the Powers of exonerating Small Livings and Charitable Institutions from the Land Tax, and for making further Provision for the Redemption of the Land Tax. (Repealed by Statute Law (Repeals) Act 1989 (c. 43))
Vexatious Arrests Act 1817 (repealed)	57 Geo. 3. c. 101	11 July 1817
An Act to continue an Act, (Note: Frivolous Arrests Act 1811 (51 Geo. 3. c. 124)) intituled "An Act further to extend and render more effectual certain Provisions of an Act passed in the Twelfth Year of the Reign of His late Majesty King George the First, (Note: Frivolous Arrests Act 1725 (12 Geo. 1. c. 29)) intituled, 'An Act to prevent frivolous and vexatious Arrests,' and of an Act passed in the Fifth Year of the Reign of His Majesty King George the Second, (Note: Process for Small Debts Act 1731 (5 Geo. 2. c. 27)) to explain, amend, and render more effectual the said former Act; and of Two Acts, passed in the Nineteenth (Note: Inferior Courts Act 1779 (19 Geo. 3. c. 70)) and Forty third (Note: Costs Act 1803 (43 Geo. 3. c. 46)) Years of the Reign of His present Majesty extending the Provisions of the said former Acts." (Repealed by Statute Law Revision Act 1873 (36 & 37 Vict. c. 91))
Militia Pay (Great Britain) Act 1817 (repealed)	57 Geo. 3. c. 102	11 July 1817
An Act to defray the Charge of the Pay, Cloathing and contingent Expences of the Disembodied Militia in Great Britain, and of the Miners of Cornwall and Devon; and for granting Allowances, in certain cases, to Subaltern Officers, Adjutants, Quartermasters, Surgeons' Mates, and Serjeant Majors of Militia, until the Twenty fifth Day of March One thousand eight hundred and eighteen. (Repealed by Statute Law Revision Act 1873 (36 & 37 Vict. c. 91))
Militia Pay (Ireland) Act 1817 (repealed)	57 Geo. 3. c. 103	11 July 1817
An Act for defraying until the Twenty fifth Day of June One thousand eight hundred and eighteen, the Charge of the Pay and Cloathing of the Militia of Ireland; and for making Allowances in certain cases to Subaltern Officers of the said Militia during Peace. (Repealed by Statute Law Revision Act 1873 (36 & 37 Vict. c. 91))
Militia (Ireland) Act 1817 (repealed)	57 Geo. 3. c. 104	11 July 1817
An Act to reduce the Number of Serjeants, Corporals and Drummers in the Militia of Ireland, whilst disembodied. (Repealed by Statute Law Revision Act 1873 (36 & 37 Vict. c. 91))
Savings Banks (Ireland) Act 1817 (repealed)	57 Geo. 3. c. 105	11 July 1817
An Act to encourage the Establishment of Banks for Savings in Ireland. (Repealed by Savings Bank Act 1828 (9 Geo. 4. c. 92))
Asylums for Lunatic Poor (Ireland) Act 1817 or the Irish Lunatic Asylums for the Poor Act 1817 (repealed)	57 Geo. 3. c. 106	11 July 1817
An Act to provide for the Establishment of Asylums for the Lunatic Poor in Ireland. (Repealed by Lunacy (Ireland) Act 1821 (1 & 2 Geo. 4. c. 33))
Grand Jury Presentments (Ireland) Act 1817 (repealed)	57 Geo. 3. c. 107	11 July 1817
An Act to provide for the more deliberate Investigation of Presentments to be made by Grand Juries for Roads and Public Works in Ireland, and for accounting for Money raised by such Presentments. (Repealed by Grand Jury Presentments (Ireland) (No. 2) Act 1818 (58 Geo. 3. c. 67))
Tolls (Ireland) Act 1817	57 Geo. 3. c. 108	11 July 1817
An Act for the Regulation of levying Tolls at Fairs, Markets, and Ports in Ireland.
Abolition of a Certain Subsidy Act 1817 (repealed)	57 Geo. 3. c. 109	11 July 1817
An Act to abolish the Subsidy and Alnage of the Old and New Draperies, and of all Woollen Manufactures, in Ireland; and to authorize the Payment out of the Consolidated Fund of an Annual Sum to John Lord de Blaquiere, during the Continuance of his Interest in the Office of Alnager. (Repealed by Statute Law Revision Act 1873 (36 & 37 Vict. c. 91))
Duties on Spirits (Ireland) Act 1817 (repealed)	57 Geo. 3. c. 110	11 July 1817
An Act to make further Regulations for the better collecting and securing the Duties upon Spirits distilled in Ireland. (Repealed by Statute Law Revision Act 1873 (36 & 37 Vict. c. 91))
Duty on Sweets, etc. Act 1817 (repealed)	57 Geo. 3. c. 111	11 July 1817
An Act to suspend until the Tenth Day of October One thousand eight hundred and nineteen, a Part of the Duties on Sweets or Made Wines. (Repealed by Exciseable Liquors Act 1825 (6 Geo. 4. c. 37))
Office of Treasurer of the Navy Act 1817 (repealed)	57 Geo. 3. c. 112	11 July 1817
An Act to amend an Act of the Twenty fifth Year of the Reign of His present Majesty, (Note: Treasurer of the Navy Act 1785 (25 Geo. 3. c. 31)) for better regulating the Office of Treasurer of His Majesty's Navy, as far as respects the Mode of Applications for certain Services in the Victualling Department. (Repealed by Treasurer of the Navy Act 1830 (11 Geo. 4 & 1 Will. 4. c. 42))
Tokens (No. 2) Act 1817 (repealed)	57 Geo. 3. c. 113	11 July 1817
An Act to prevent the further Circulation of Dollars and Tokens, issued by the Governor and Company of the Bank of England, for the Convenience of the Public. (Repealed by Coinage Act 1870 (33 & 34 Vict. c. 10))
Bringing of Coals to London, etc. Act 1817 (repealed)	57 Geo. 3. c. 114	11 July 1817
An Act to continue, until the First Day of August One thousand eight hundred and eighteen, Two Acts of His present Majesty, (Note: Bringing of Coals, etc., to London, etc. Act 1805 (45 Geo. 3. c. 128)) (Note: Bringing of Coals, etc., to London, etc. Act 1810 (50 Geo. 3. c. 110)) allowing the bringing of Coals, Culm and Cinders to London and Westminster. (Repealed by Statute Law Revision Act 1873 (36 & 37 Vict. c. 91))
Payment of Cutters' Wages Act 1817 (repealed)	57 Geo. 3. c. 115	11 July 1817
An Act to extend the Provisions of an Act of the Twelfth Year of His late Majesty King George the First, (Note: Woollen Manufactures Act 1725 (12 Geo. 1. c. 34)) and an Act of the Twenty second Year of His late Majesty King George the Second, (Note: Frauds by Workmen Act 1748 (22 Geo. 2. c. 27)) against Payment of Labourers in Goods or by Truck, and to secure their Payment in the lawful Money of this Realm, to Labourers employed in the Manufacture of Articles made of Steel, or of Steel and Iron combined, and of Plated Articles, or of other Articles of Cutlery. (Repealed by Truck Amendment Act 1887 (50 & 51 Vict. c. 46))
Customs and Excise Act 1817 (repealed)	57 Geo. 3. c. 116	11 July 1817
An Act for limiting the time now allowed by Law for Production of the Certificate of due Delivery of Goods removed from one Warehousing Port in Great Britain to another for the Purpose of Exportation; for altering the Hours for shipping Goods in the Port of London; and to empower Officers of the Customs and Excise to permit the Removal of Goods from one Bonding Warehouse to another in the same Port. (Repealed by Customs Law Repeal Act 1825 (6 Geo. 4. c. 105))
Extents in Aid Act 1817 (repealed)	57 Geo. 3. c. 117	11 July 1817
An Act to regulate the issuing of Extents in Aid. (Repealed by Crown Proceedings Act 1947 (10 & 11 Geo. 6. c. 44))
Navy Prize Money, etc. Act 1817 (repealed)	57 Geo. 3. c. 118	11 July 1817
An Act for authorizing the Executors or Administrators of deceased licensed Navy Agents to receive Prize Money, Bounty Money and other Allowances of Money upon Orders given to such deceased Agents. (Repealed by Admiralty, &c. Acts Repeal Act 1865 (28 & 29 Vict. c. 112))
Duty on Stone Bottles Act 1817 (repealed)	57 Geo. 3. c. 119	11 July 1817
An Act to exempt British and Irish Stone Bottles made and used for the sole Purpose of containing Liquid Blacking from the Duties of Excise on Stone Bottles granted by an Act of this Session of Parliament. (Note: Duties on Stone Bottles Act 1817 (57 Geo. 3. c. 32)) (Repealed by Statute Law Revision Act 1861 (24 & 25 Vict. c. 101))
East India Company Act 1817 (repealed)	57 Geo. 3. c. 120	11 July 1817
An Act to authorize the Court of Directors of the East India Company to make extraordinary Allowances, in certain Cases to the Owners of certain Ships in the Service of the said Company. (Repealed by Statute Law Revision Act 1873 (36 & 37 Vict. c. 91))
Treasurer of the Navy, etc. Act 1817 (repealed)	57 Geo. 3. c. 121	11 July 1817
An Act for regulating Payments to the Treasurer of the Navy under the Heads of Old Stores and Imprests. (Repealed by Treasurer of the Navy Act 1821 (1 & 2 Geo. 4. c. 74))
Payment of Colliers' Wages Act 1817 (repealed)	57 Geo. 3. c. 122	11 July 1817
An Act to extend the Provisions of an Act of the Twelfth Year of His late Majesty King George the First, and an Act of the Twenty second Year of His late Majesty King George the Second, against Payment of Labourers in Goods or by Truck, and to secure their Payment in the lawful Money of this Realm, to Labourers employed in the Collieries, or in the working and getting of Coal, in the United Kingdom of Great Britain and Ireland; and for extending the Provisions of the said Acts to Scotland and Ireland. (Repealed by Truck Amendment Act 1887 (50 & 51 Vict. c. 46))
Excise (No. 2) Act 1817 (repealed)	57 Geo. 3. c. 123	11 July 1817
An Act for imposing a Duty of Excise on the Excess of Spirits made from Corn in England above the Proportion of Nineteen Gallons of Spirits for every One hundred Gallons of Wash; and for further securing the Duties on Wort or Wash made for distilling Spirits in England; and for authorizing the Shipment of Rum for Stores in Casks containing Sixty Gallons. (Repealed by Statute Law Revision Act 1861 (24 & 25 Vict. c. 101))
Public Works Loans (No. 2) Act 1817 (repealed)	57 Geo. 3. c. 124	11 July 1817
An Act to amend an Act made in the present Session of Parliament, (Note: Public Works Loans Act 1817 (57 Geo. 3. c. 34)) for authorizing the Issue of Exchequer Bills, and the Advance of Money for carrying on Public Works and Fisheries, and Employment of the Poor. (Repealed by Public Works Loans Act 1875 (38 & 39 Vict. c. 89))
Hackney Coach Licences Act 1817 (repealed)	57 Geo. 3. c. 125	11 July 1817
An Act to authorize the driving and keeping a Hackney Coach or Chariot under the same Licence. (Repealed by London Hackney Carriage Act 1831 (1 & 2 Will. 4. c. 22))
Destroying Stocking Frames, etc. Act 1817 (repealed)	57 Geo. 3. c. 126	11 July 1817
An Act to repeal an Act, passed in the Fifty fourth Year of His present Majesty, (Note: Destruction of Stocking Frames, etc. Act 1813 (54 Geo. 3. c. 42)) for the Punishment of Persons destroying Stocking or Lace Frames, and Articles in such Frames; and to make, until the First Day of August One thousand eight hundred and twenty, other Provisions in lieu thereof. (Repealed by Statute Law Revision Act 1873 (36 & 37 Vict. c. 91))
Prize Money, etc. Act 1817 (repealed)	57 Geo. 3. c. 127	11 July 1817
An Act to settle the Share of Prize Money, Droits of Admiralty, and Bounty Money payable to Greenwich Hospital, and for securing to the said Hospital all unclaimed Shares of Vessels found derelict, and of Seizures for Breach of Revenue, Colonial, Navigation and Slave Abolition Laws. (Repealed by Naval Prize Acts Repeal Act 1864 (27 & 28 Vict. c. 23))
Window Duties (Scotland) Act 1817 (repealed)	57 Geo. 3. c. 128	11 July 1817
An Act for extending the Exemptions from the Duties granted by certain Acts of the Forty third (Note: House Tax Act 1803 (43 Geo. 3. c. 161)) and Forty fifth Years of His present Majesty's Reign, in Dwelling Houses in Scotland; and for altering the Manner of claiming and ascertaining the Exemptions to be granted. (Repealed by Statute Law Revision Act 1861 (24 & 25 Vict. c. 101))
Manor of Rialton and Retraighe Act 1817 (repealed)	57 Geo. 3. c. 129	11 July 1817
An Act for vesting in His Majesty a certain Part of the Open Commons and Waste Lands within the Manor or Royalty of Rialton and Retraighe alias Reterth in the Parish of Saint Columb Major, in the County of Cornwall. (Repealed by Statute Law (Repeals) Act 1978 (c. 45))
Savings Bank (England) Act 1817 (repealed)	57 Geo. 3. c. 130	12 July 1817
An Act to encourage the Establishment of Banks for Savings in England. (Repealed by Savings Bank Act 1828 (9 Geo. 4. c. 92))
Parliamentary Elections (Ireland) Act 1817 (repealed)	57 Geo. 3. c. 131	12 July 1817
An Act for the better Regulation of Polls, and for making other Provisions touching the Election of Members to serve in Parliament for Places in Ireland. (Repealed by Parliamentary Elections (Ireland) Act 1820 (60 Geo. 3 & 1 Geo. 4. c. 11))
Appropriation Act 1817 (repealed)	57 Geo. 3. c. 132	12 July 1817
An Act for applying certain Monies therein mentioned for the Service of the Year One thousand eight hundred and seventeen; and for further appropriating the Supplies granted in this Session of Parliament. (Repealed by Statute Law Revision Act 1873 (36 & 37 Vict. c. 91))

=== Local acts ===
Short title	Citation	Royal assent
Long title
Middlesex and Essex Coal Trade Act 1817	57 Geo. 3. c. i	4 March 1817
An Act to extend the Limits of an Act, made in the last Session of Parliament, (Note: Middlesex and Essex Coal Trade Act 1816 (56 Geo. 3. c. xxi)) for preventing Frauds in the Admeasurement of Coals in certain Parishes in the Counties of Middlesex and Essex.
Tetbury Improvement Act 1817 (repealed)	57 Geo. 3. c. ii	17 March 1817
An Act for paving the Footways, and for lighting and cleansing the Streets, Lanes and public Places within the Town and Borough of Tetbury, in the County of Gloucester, and for preventing Nuisances therein. (Repealed by Local Government Board's Provisional Orders Confirmation Act 1874 (37 & 38 Vict. c. i))
Roads from Henfield and from Poyning's Common Act 1817	57 Geo. 3. c. iii	17 March 1817
An Act for continuing the Term and enlarging the Powers of Two Acts of the Seventeenth (Note: Sussex Roads (No. 2) Act 1777 (17 Geo. 3. c. 91)) and Thirty eighth (Note: Roads from Henfield and from Poyning's Common (Sussex) Act 1798 (38 Geo. 3. c. liii)) Years of His present Majesty, for repairing the Roads from Henfield to Brighthelmstone, (Note: Brighthelmstone is now known as Brighton.) and from Poyning's Common to High Cross, in the County of Sussex; and for repealing so much of the said Acts as relates to certain Parts of the said Roads.
Coventry Roads Act 1817 (repealed)	57 Geo. 3. c. iv	17 March 1817
An Act for more effectually repairing the Roads from Coventry to Warwick, and from Coventry to Martyn's Gutter, in the County of the City of Coventry, and in the County of Warwick. (Repealed by Coventry to Warwick and Coventry to Martyn's Cutter Roads Act 1841 (4 & 5 Vict. c. xxxiv))
Road from Cross Hands to Halford Bridge Act 1817 (repealed)	57 Geo. 3. c. v	17 March 1817
An Act for repairing the Road from the Cross Hands, on the Worcester and Oxford Turnpike Road, to Halford Bridge, and other Roads therein mentioned, in the Counties of Gloucester, Warwick and Worcester. (Repealed by Annual Turnpike Acts Continuance Act 1870 (33 & 34 Vict. c. 73))
Shrewsbury and Bridgnorth Road Act 1817 (repealed)	57 Geo. 3. c. vi	17 March 1817
An Act for enlarging the Term and Powers of several Acts of His late and present Majesty, for repairing the Road from the Town of Shrewsbury to Bridgnorth, and several other Roads near or adjoining thereto, in the Counties of Salop and Stafford. (Repealed by Shrewsbury, Wenlock and Bridgnorth Turnpike Roads Act 1851 (14 & 15 Vict. c. xxiv))
St. Olave Southwark Rectory Act 1817 (repealed)	57 Geo. 3. c. vii	17 March 1817
An Act for making better Provision for the Support and Maintenance of the Rector of the Parish of Saint Olave, in the Town and Borough of Southwark; and for providing a more convenient Rectory or Parsonage House for the said Rector. (Repealed by Statute Law (Repeals) Act 2013 (c. 2))
East India Company and the Nabobs of the Carnatic Act 1817 (repealed)	57 Geo. 3. c. viii	17 March 1817
An Act for further continuing, until the First Day of August One thousand eight hundred and eighteen, and from thence to the End of the then next Session of Parliament, the Powers given by an Act of the Forty sixth Year of His present Majesty, (Note: East India Company and the Nabobs of the Carnatic Act 1806 (46 Geo. 3. c. cxxxiii)) for enabling the Commissioners acting in Execution of an Agreement made between the East India Company and the private Creditors of the Nabobs of the Carnatic, the better to carry the same into Effect. (Repealed by Statute Law (Repeals) Act 2008 (c. 12))
Northampton Judges' Accommodations Act 1817 (repealed)	57 Geo. 3. c. ix	29 March 1817
An Act for providing a convenient House, with suitable Accommodations, for His Majesty's Judges at the Assizes for the County of Northampton. (Repealed by Northampton Act 1988 (c. xxix))
West Houghton and Duxbury Stocks Road Act 1817 (repealed)	57 Geo. 3. c. x	29 March 1817
An Act for more effectually repairing and improving the Road from West Houghton to Duxbury Stocks, in the County of Lancaster. (Repealed by West Houghton and Heath Charnock Road (Lancashire) Act 1826 (7 Geo. 4. c. lxxxii))
Towcester and Cotton End Road Act 1817 (repealed)	57 Geo. 3. c. xi	29 March 1817
An Act for enlarging the Term and Powers of an Act of His present Majesty, (Note: Towcester to Hardington Road Act 1795 (35 Geo. 3. c. 153)) for repairing the Road leading from Towcester to the Turnpike Road in Cotton End, in the Parish of Hardington, in the County of Northampton. (Repealed by Towcester and Cotton End Road Act 1838 (1 & 2 Vict. c. xlv))
Madeley and Wellington Turnpike Road Act 1817	57 Geo. 3. c. xii	29 April 1817
An Act for making and maintaining a Turnpike Road from and out of the Turnpike Road at the Bottom of Coalbrook Dale, in the Parish of Madeley, into the Turnpike Road leading from Shiffnall to Shrewsbury, at or near a Place called Watling Street, in the Parish of Wellington, all in the County of Salop.
Road from Cromford to Belper Act 1817 (repealed)	57 Geo. 3. c. xiii	29 April 1817
An Act for making and maintaining a Turnpike Road from the Town of Cromford to the Town of Belper; and for making a Branch of Road from and out of the said Road near the River Amber, to join the Turnpike Road at Bull Bridge, all in the County of Derby. (Repealed by Road from Cromford to Belper Act 1843 (6 & 7 Vict. c. xcv))
Kentish Town Improvement Act 1817 (repealed)	57 Geo. 3. c. xiv	23 May 1817
An Act for lighting and watching Kentish Town in the Parish of Saint Pancras in the County of Middlesex. (Repealed by Kentish Town Improvement Act 1841 (4 & 5 Vict. c. lxvii))
Stratford-upon-Avon Canal Act 1817	57 Geo. 3. c. xv	23 May 1817
An Act to enable the Company of Proprietors of the Stratford upon Avon Canal Navigation to raise Money to discharge their Debts, and to complete the said Canal.
Penistone and Sheffield Road Act 1817 (repealed)	57 Geo. 3. c. xvi	23 May 1817
An Act for enlarging the Term and Powers of several Acts of the Seventeenth (Note: Halifax to Sheffield Road Act 1777 (17 Geo. 3. c. 106)) and Thirty seventh (Note: Halifax and Sheffield Road Act 1797 (37 Geo. 3. c. 160)) Years of His present Majesty, for repairing the Road from Halifax to Sheffield, in the West Riding of the County of York, so far as relate to the Road from Penistone to Sheffield. (Repealed by Halifax to Sheffield Road (Third District) Act 1826 (7 Geo. 4. c. cxxvii))
Aylesbury and West Wycombe Road Act 1817 (repealed)	57 Geo. 3. c. xvii	23 May 1817
An Act to continue and amend an Act passed in the Thirty fifth Year of His present Majesty, (Note: Aylesbury to West Wycombe Road Act 1795 (35 Geo. 3. c. 149)) for amending, widening, altering, improving and keeping in Repair the Road leading out of the Turnpike Road between Aylesbury and Wendover, through Prince's Risborough, to West Wycombe, in the County of Buckingham. (Repealed by Princes Risborough Roads Act 1825 (6 Geo. 4. c. xlv))
Brough and Eamont Bridge Road Act 1817 (repealed)	57 Geo. 3. c. xviii	23 May 1817
An Act for enlarging the Term and Powers of several Acts passed for repairing and widening the Roads from the East End of Brough under Stainmoor in the County of Westmorland, by the End of Appleby Bridge to Eamont Bridge in the said County. (Repealed by Brough and Eamont Bridge Turnpike Act 1856 (19 & 20 Vict. c. lxxii))
Bathwick Parish Church and Workhouse Act 1817 (repealed)	57 Geo. 3. c. xix	23 May 1817
An Act to amend an Act of the Fifty fifth Year of His present Majesty, (Note: Bathwick Parish Church and Workhouse Act 1815 (55 Geo. 3. c. xcvi)) for building a new Church and Workhouse in the Parish of Bathwick, in the County of Somerset. (Repealed by Bathwick Church and Workhouse Act 1847 (10 & 11 Vict. c. ccl))
Ayr Harbour Act 1817 (repealed)	57 Geo. 3. c. xx	23 May 1817
An Act for improving and maintaining the Harbour of Ayr, and for regulating Vessels resorting thereto. (Repealed by Ayr Harbour Act 1835 (5 & 6 Will. 4. c. lxxix))
Sculcoates Parish Burial Ground Act 1817	57 Geo. 3. c. xxi	23 May 1817
An Act for providing an additional Burial Ground for the Parish of Sculcoates in the East Riding of the County of York.
Newton Chapel (Manchester) Act 1817	57 Geo. 3. c. xxii	23 May 1817
An Act for amending an Act of His present Majesty, (Note: Newton Chapel (Manchester) Act 1814 (54 Geo. 3. c. xxxii)) for rebuilding Newton Chapel, in the County Palatine of Lancaster.
Metropolis Gas Act 1817 (repealed)	57 Geo. 3. c. xxiii	23 May 1817
An Act for better lighting the Streets and Houses of the Metropolis with Gas. (Repealed by City of London Gas Company's Act 1859 (22 & 23 Vict. c. lii))
Worcester (City) Roads Act 1817 (repealed)	57 Geo. 3. c. xxiv	23 May 1817
An Act to amend an Act, of the last Session of Parliament, (Note: Worcester (City) Roads Act 1816 (56 Geo. 3. c. xlvi)) for the better repairing the several Roads leading into and from the City of Worcester. (Repealed by Worcester (City) Turnpike Roads Act 1835 (5 & 6 Will. 4. c. lxiii))
Yarmouth Bridge and Gorleston Road Act 1817 (repealed)	57 Geo. 3. c. xxv	23 May 1817
An Act to continue and amend Two Acts of the Fifteenth (Note: Yarmouth to Gorleston Road Act 1775 (15 Geo. 3. c. 67)) and Thirty fifth (Note: Yarmouth to Gorleston Road Act 1795 (35 Geo. 3. c. 132)) Years of His present Majesty, for amending and widening the Road leading from Yarmouth Bridge through Little Yarmouth, to Gorleston, in the County of Suffolk. (Repealed by Yarmouth Bridge and Gorleston Road (Suffolk) Act 1834 (4 & 5 Will. 4. c. xxix))
Bagshot and Farnham, and Alton and Winchester Roads Act 1817	57 Geo. 3. c. xxvi	23 May 1817
An Act for amending the Roads leading from Basingstone, (Note: The Basing Stone was located near the former Jolly Farmer public house, at the junction of the A30 and A325 roads.) near Bagshot, through Farnham, in the County of Surrey, and Alton and New Alresford, to Winchester, in the County of Southampton.
Richmond (Yorkshire), Lancaster, Lucy Cross and Gatherley Moor Roads Act 1817	57 Geo. 3. c. xxvii	23 May 1817
An Act for more effectually improving the Road from Richmond, in the County of York, to Lancaster, in the County of Lancaster, and the Road from Richmond to Lucy Cross, and from Gilling to the Turnpike Road on Gatherley Moor, in the County of York.
Bedford and Kimbolton Road Act 1817 (repealed)	57 Geo. 3. c. xxviii	23 May 1817
An Act for continuing and amending an Act of His present Majesty, for repairing the Road from the Town of Bedford, in the County of Bedford, to Kimbolton in the County of Huntingdon. (Repealed by Bedford and Kimbolton Road Act 1852 (15 & 16 Vict. c. lx))
Metropolitan Paving Act 1817 (repealed)	57 Geo. 3. c. xxix	16 June 1817
An Act for better paving, improving and regulating the Streets of the Metropolis, and removing and preventing Nuisances and Obstructions therein. (Repealed by London Government Act 1963 (c. 33))
Newcastle-upon-Tyne Coal Trade Act 1817	57 Geo. 3. c. xxx	16 June 1817
An Act to regulate the loading of Ships with Coals in the Port of Newcastle upon Tyne.
Penzance Pier and Harbour Dues Act 1817 (repealed)	57 Geo. 3. c. xxxi	16 June 1817
An Act for fixing the Dues, Duties and Payments for all Goods, Wares and Merchandize landed on or shipped from the Pier or Quay of the Town of Penzance in the County of Cornwall, and on all Ships and Vessels resorting to the said Pier or Quay, or to the Harbour of Penzance. (Repealed by Penzance Corporation Act 1883 (46 & 47 Vict. c. lxxiv))
Greenock Improvement Act 1817	57 Geo. 3. c. xxxii	16 June 1817
An Act for the further Improvement of the Town and Harbours of Greenock; for establishing and supporting a Harbour Police, and for the better regulating the Poor of the Three Parishes of Greenock.
Edinburgh Police Act 1817	57 Geo. 3. c. xxxiii	16 June 1817
An Act for altering and amending an Act of the Fifty second Year of His present Majesty, (Note: Edinburgh Police Act 1812 (52 Geo. 3. c. clxxii)) for regulating the Police of the City of Edinburgh and the adjoining Districts, and for other Purposes relating thereto.
Poplar and Blackwall Parish Act 1817 (repealed)	57 Geo. 3. c. xxxiv	16 June 1817
An Act for making the Hamlet of Poplar and Blackwall, in the County of Middlesex, a separate and distinct Parish; and for erecting a Parish Church therein, and other Purposes relating thereto. (Repealed by Poplar All Saints (Rate Abolition) Act 1903 (3 Edw. 7. c. xvi))
Christchurch (Surrey) Churchyard Act 1817 (repealed)	57 Geo. 3. c. xxxv	16 June 1817
An Act for enlarging the Church Yard of the Parish of Christ Church in the County of Surrey; and for other Purposes relating thereto. (Repealed by London Government (Borough of Southwark) Order in Council 1901 (SR&O 1901/275))
Bradford Burial Ground Act 1817	57 Geo. 3. c. xxxvi	16 June 1817
An Act for enlarging the Church Yard, and providing additional Burying Ground, for the Parish of Bradford, in the West Riding of the County of York.
Mansfield and Pinxton Railway Act 1817	57 Geo. 3. c. xxxvii	16 June 1817
An Act for making and maintaining a Railing or Tram Road from Bull's Head Lane. in the Parish of Mansfield. in the County of Nottingham. to communicate with the Cromford Canal at Pinxton Basin, in the Parish of Pinxton, in the County of Derby.
Norton and Heckingham Inclosures Act 1817	57 Geo. 3. c. xxxviii	16 June 1817
An Act for inclosing Lands within the Parishes of Norton and Heckingham, in the County of Norfolk; and for draining certain Lands in the said Parish of Norton.
Dublin Improvement Act 1817	57 Geo. 3. c. xxxix	16 June 1817
An Act to amend an Act, passed in the Forty seventh Year of His present Majesty, (Note: Dublin (South and West) Improvement Act 1807 (47 Geo. 3 Sess. 2. c. lxxiv)) for improving and rendering more commodious such Parts of the County and County of the City of Dublin as are situate on the South Side of the River Anna Liffey, and Weft of His Majesty's Castle of Dublin; and for the Appointment of an Inspector of the Presentments and other Accounts of the County of the City of Dublin.
Westminster Coal Trade Act 1817	57 Geo. 3. c. xl	16 June 1817
An Act for continuing the Term and enlarging the Powers granted to the Principal Land Coal Meters for the City and Liberty of Westminster; and for extending the Limits of their Office to the Parish of Saint Luke Chelsea.
Glasgow Gas Act 1817 (repealed)	57 Geo. 3. c. xli	16 June 1817
An Act for lighting the City and Suburbs of Glasgow with Gas, and for other Purposes relating thereto. (Repealed by Glasgow Gas Act 1910 (10 Edw. 7 & 1 Geo. 5. c. cxxxi))
Kent Coal Trade (Frauds Prevention) Act 1817 (repealed)	57 Geo. 3. c. xlii	16 June 1817
An Act to repeal an Act made in the last Session of Parliament, (Note: Kent Coal Trade Act 1816 (56 Geo. 3. c. lxxviii)) for preventing Frauds in the Admeasurement and Delivery of Coals within the several Parishes lying contiguous to the Water Side in the County of Kent. (Repealed by County of Kent Act 1981 (c. xviii))
Stirling and Queensferry Road Act 1817	57 Geo. 3. c. xliii	16 June 1817
An Act to continue and amend an Act, made in the Forty second Year of His present Majesty, (Note: Stirling and Queensferry Road Act 1802 (42 Geo. 3. c. xcvii)) for repairing the Road from Causeway Head, near Stirling, through the County of Clackmannan, towards Queen's Ferry, and certain Roads branching out of the same.
Truro Roads Act 1817 (repealed)	57 Geo. 3. c. xliv	16 June 1817
An Act for enlarging the Term and Powers of several Acts of His present Majesty, for repairing certain Roads leading from Truro, and other Roads communicating therewith, in the County of Cornwall; and for building and keeping in Repair a Bridge over the River there. (Repealed by Truro Roads Act 1828 (9 Geo. 4. c. iii))
Road to Middleton Bridge Act 1817	57 Geo. 3. c. xlv	16 June 1817
An Act for making and keeping in Repair a Carriage Road from or near the Town of Brough under Stainmore, in the County of Westmorland, to Middleton Bridge, in the Parish of Romaldkirk, in the North Riding of the County of York, with a Branch from or near Chapel House to Eggleston Bridge, in the same Parish.
Road from Stamford to Greetham Act 1817	57 Geo. 3. c. xlvi	16 June 1817
An Act for continuing and amending an Act of His present Majesty, (Note: Stamford to Greetham Road Act 1795 (35 Geo. 3. c. 152)) for repairing the Road from Stamford, in the County of Lincoln, through Oakham, to the Great North Road, in the Parish of Greetham, in the County of Rutland.
Manchester to Newton Road Act 1817	57 Geo. 3. c. xlvii	16 June 1817
An Act for making and keeping in Repair a Carriage Road from the Township of Manchester to Newton Chapel in the Township of Newton, with a Branch to the River Medlock in the Township of Droylsden, in the County Palatine of Lancaster.
Christchurch (Surrey) Improvement Act 1817	57 Geo. 3. c. xlviii	16 June 1817
An Act for shutting up and discontinuing a certain Way or Passage called Old Paris Garden Lane, situate in the Parish of Christ Church in the County of Surrey, and for selling and disposing of the Ground and Soil thereof.
Dublin and Mullingar Turnpike Road Act 1817	57 Geo. 3. c. xlix	16 June 1817
An Act to continue an Act, passed in the Parliament of Ireland in the Thirty fifth Year of His present Majesty, (Note: Dublin and Mullingar Road Act 1795 (35 Geo. 3. c. 43 (I))) for improving and repairing the Turnpike Road leading from Dublin to Mullingar, and for repealing the several Laws theretofore made relating to the said Road.
Rochdale and Burnley Road Act 1817 (repealed)	57 Geo. 3. c. l	16 June 1817
An Act to continue the Term and alter and enlarge the Powers of an Act of His present Majesty, (Note: Rochdale and Burnley Road Act 1798 (38 Geo. 3. c. li)) for keeping in Repair the Road leading from the Town of Rochdale, in the County Palatine of Lancaster, to the Town of Burnley, in the said County, and for making Two new Branches of Road to communicate therewith. (Repealed by Rochdale and Burnley Road Act 1825 (6 Geo. 4. c. cxlv))
Leeds and Homefield Lane End Road Act 1817 (repealed)	57 Geo. 3. c. li	16 June 1817
An Act for making and maintaining a Road from Quebec, in the Parish of Leeds, in the West Riding of the County of York, to Homefield Lane End, in the same Parish, with a Bridge or Bridges on the Line of such Road. (Repealed by Leeds and Homefield Lane End Road Act 1834 (4 & 5 Will. 4. c. xxxii))
Roads in Kincardine Act 1817 (repealed)	57 Geo. 3. c. lii	16 June 1817
An Act for more effectually repairing the Road from the Bridge of Dee Southward, through the County of Kincardine, to Stonehaven; and from thence, by Inverbervie and by Laurencekirk, to the Lower and Upper Bridges over the River North Esk; and for making and repairing other Roads in the said County. (Repealed by Kincardine Roads Act 1838 (1 & 2 Vict. c. vii))
Stansted Chapel, Staughton (Sussex) Act 1817	57 Geo. 3. c. liii	20 June 1817
An Act for settling the Right of Patronage or Presentation of or to a Chapel to be called Stansted Chapel, in the Parish of Stoughton, in the County of Sussex.
Road from Crowland to Eye Act 1817 (repealed)	57 Geo. 3. c. liv	20 June 1817
An Act for making and maintaining a Turnpike Road from the Town of Crowland, in the County of Lincoln, to the Town of Eye, in the County of Northampton. (Repealed by Crowland and Eye Turnpike Road Act 1856 (19 & 20 Vict. c. xxxi))
Wrotham Heath Roads Act 1817 (repealed)	57 Geo. 3. c. lv	20 June 1817
An Act to continue the Term and alter and enlarge the Powers of Two Acts of His present Majesty, (Note: Kent Roads Act 1773 (13 Geo. 3. c. 98)) (Note: Kent Roads Act 1795 (35 Geo. 3. c. 165)) for repairing the Road from Wrotham Heath to Foots Cray, and from Wrotham Heath to Maidstone, in the County of Kent; and the Road from the said Road into the Turnpike Road from Mereworth to Hadlow in the said County. (Repealed by Wrotham Heath Roads (Kent) Act 1828 (9 Geo. 4. c. xviii))
Edinburgh and Glasgow Union Canal Company Act 1817	57 Geo. 3. c. lvi	27 June 1817
An Act for making and maintaining a Navigable Canal from the Lothian Road, near the City of Edinburgh, to join the Forth and Clyde Navigation near Falkirk, in the County of Stirling.
Belfast Charitable Society and Water Supply Act 1817	57 Geo. 3. c. lvii	27 June 1817
An Act for giving further Powers to the President and Assistants of the Charitable Society of the Town of Belfast, in the County of Antrim, to supply the said Town with Water, and to improve their Estates.
Blackfriars Bridge (Manchester) Act 1817	57 Geo. 3. c. lviii	27 June 1817
An Act for building a Bridge across the River Irwell, from Water Street, in the Township of Salford, to Saint Mary's Gate, in the Township of Manchester, all in the County of Lancaster, and for making proper Avenues thereto.
Great Bolton Improvement Act 1817 (repealed)	57 Geo. 3. c. lix	27 June 1817
An Act for granting further Powers for improving the Town of Great Bolton, in the County of Lancaster. (Repealed by Borough of Bolton Act 1850 (13 & 14 Vict. c. xl))
City of London Gauger Act 1817 (repealed)	57 Geo. 3. c. lx	27 June 1817
An Act for granting an Equivalent for the Diminution of the Profits of the Office of Gauger of the City of London, and increasing the Payments to be made by Brokers. (Repealed by Statute Law (Repeals) Act 2013 (c. 2))
British Gallery of Pictures Act 1817	57 Geo. 3. c. lxi	27 June 1817
An Act to enable Peltro William Tomkins of New Bond Street, in the City of Westminster, Engraver to The Queen's Most Excellent Majesty, to dispose of his Collection of Paintings, Drawings and Engravings, together with several Copies of certain Books therein mentioned, and the Lease of the Premises called The British Gallery of Pictures, by way of Lottery.
Commercial Docks Act 1817 (repealed)	57 Geo. 3. c. lxii	7 July 1817
An Act to amend Two Acts (Note: Commercial Docks Act 1810 (50 Geo. 3. c. ccvii)) (Note: Commercial Docks Act 1811 (51 Geo. 3. c. lxvi)) for maintaining and improving the Commercial Docks in the Parish of Saint Mary Rotherhithe in the County of Surrey. (Repealed by Surrey Commercial Dock Act 1864 (27 & 28 Vict. c. xxxi))
Portsmouth and Arundel Navigation Act 1817	57 Geo. 3. c. lxiii	7 July 1817
An Act for making and maintaining a Navigable Canal from the River Arun to Chichester Harbour, and from thence to Langstone and Portsmouth Harbours, with a Cut or Branch from Hunston Common to or near the City of Chichester; and for improving the Navigation of the Harbour of Langstone and Channels of Langstone and Thorney.
Hull and Frodingham Beck Navigation Act 1817	57 Geo. 3. c. lxiv	7 July 1817
An Act to amend and enlarge the Powers of Two Acts of His present Majesty, (Note: River Hull and Frodingham Beck Navigation Act 1766 (7 Geo. 3. c. 97)) (Note: Hull and Frodingham Beck Navigation Act 1801 (41 Geo. 3. (U.K.). c. cxxxiv)) for improving the Navigation of the River Hull and Frodingham Beck, and extending the same to the Town of Great Driffield, in the County of York.
Taunton Market Act 1817 (repealed)	57 Geo. 3. c. lxv	7 July 1817
An Act for enlarging the Market Place, and regulating the Market in the Town of Taunton, in the County of Somerset, and for improving the said Town; and for amending an Act of His present Majesty (Note: Taunton (Improvements) Act 1769 (9 Geo. 3. c. 44)) relative thereto. (Repealed by Taunton Corporation Act 1931 (21 & 22 Geo. 5. c. cii))
Forest of Dean Roads Act 1817 (repealed)	57 Geo. 3. c. lxvi	7 July 1817
An Act to amend and continue an Act of the Thirty sixth Year of His present Majesty, (Note: Dean Forest Roads Act 1796 (36 Geo. 3. c. 131)) for improving certain Roads in and through the Forest of Dean, in the County of Gloucester, and several other Roads therein mentioned. (Repealed by Forest of Dean Roads Act 1827 (7 & 8 Geo. 4. c. xii))
Taunton Roads Act 1817 (repealed)	57 Geo. 3. c. lxvii	7 July 1817
An Act for continuing and amending Two Acts of His present Majesty, (Note: Taunton Roads Act 1778 (18 Geo. 3. c. 97)) (Note: Taunton Roads Act 1799 (39 Geo. 3. c. xxxviii)) for repairing several Roads leading from the Town of Taunton in the County of Somerset. (Repealed by Taunton Roads Act 1840 (3 & 4 Vict. c. xxxvi))
Road from Cambridge to Arrington Bridge Act 1817	57 Geo. 3. c. lxviii	7 July 1817
An Act for enlarging the Term and Powers of an Act of His present Majesty, (Note: Cambridge and Arrington Roads Act 1797 (37 Geo. 3. c. 179)) for repairing the Road from Cambridge to the Old North Road, near Arrington Bridge, in the County of Cambridge.
South Holland Drainage and Road from Spalding High Bridge Act 1817	57 Geo. 3. c. lxix	10 July 1817
An Act for amending and rendering more effectual an Act of His present Majesty, (Note: South Holland Drainage Act 1793 (33 Geo. 3. c. 109)) for draining Lands in South Holland; and for continuing and amending another Act of His present Majesty, (Note: Spalding Road Act 1795 (35 Geo. 3. c. 166)) for maintaining and repairing a certain Bank, and the Road thereon, from Spalding High Bridge to Brother House, all in the County of Lincoln.
Blakeney Harbour Act 1817	57 Geo. 3. c. lxx	10 July 1817
An Act for improving the Harbour of Blakeney, within the Port of Blakeney and Clay, in the County of Norfolk.
River Lark Navigation Act 1817	57 Geo. 3. c. lxxi	10 July 1817
An Act for amending and rendering more effectual an Act of His late Majesty King William the Third, (Note: River Lark Act 1698 (11 Will. 3. c. 22)) for making the River Lark alias Burn navigable.
St. Paul Shadwell Church and Churchyard Act 1817 (repealed)	57 Geo. 3. c. lxxii	10 July 1817
An Act for rebuilding the Church, and improving the Church Yard of the Parish of Saint Paul Shadwell, in the County of Middlesex. (Repealed by London Government (Borough of Stepney) Order in Council 1901 (SR&O 1901/276))
Wapping Workhouse Act 1817 (repealed)	57 Geo. 3. c. lxxiii	10 July 1817
An Act for raising Money, by Annuities or otherwise, for the Purpose of erecting a Workhouse for the Use of the Poor of the Parish of Saint John of Wapping, in the County of Middlesex. (Repealed by London Government (Borough of Stepney) Order in Council 1901 (SR&O 1901/276))
Abernant and Abergavenny Road Act 1817 (repealed)	57 Geo. 3. c. lxxiv	10 July 1817
An Act for more effectually repairing the Road from the Neath Turnpike Road, at or near Abernant, through Merthyr Tidvill, in the County of Glamorgan, to join the Turnpike Road within the Abergavenny District, near Rhyd y Blew House, in the County of Monmouth. (Repealed by Turnpike Trusts in South Wales Act 1844 (7 & 8 Vict. c. 91))
Macclesfield to Congleton Road Act 1817 (repealed)	57 Geo. 3. c. lxxv	10 July 1817
An Act to continue and amend an Act passed in the Thirty sixth Year of His present Majesty, (Note: Macclesfield and Congleton Road Act 1796 (36 Geo. 3. c. 148)) for altering the Road from Macclesfield to Congleton, in the County of Chester. (Repealed by Macclesfield to Congleton Road Act 1840 (3 & 4 Vict. c. xxxii))
Royal Naval Asylum Act 1817 (repealed)	57 Geo. 3. c. lxxvi	11 July 1817
An Act to empower the Commissioners of the Royal Naval Asylum to make use of any Part of the Accumulation of the Interest of the Monies which were given by the Committee for managing the Patriotic Fund to the said Commissioners, for the Purposes of the said Asylum. (Repealed by Greenwich Hospital Outpensions, etc. Act 1829 (10 Geo. 4. c. 26))

=== Private acts ===
Short title	Citation	Royal assent
Long title
Drayton Inclosure Act 1817	57 Geo. 3. c. 1 Pr.	17 March 1817
An Act for inclosing Lands in the Parish of Drayton, in the County of Somerset.
Eriswell Inclosure Act 1817	57 Geo. 3. c. 2 Pr.	29 March 1817
An Act for inclosing Lands in the Parish of Eriswell, in the County of Suffolk.
Emley Inclosure Act 1817	57 Geo. 3. c. 3 Pr.	23 May 1817
An Act for inclosing Lands within the Manor of Emley, in the County of York.
Coston Inclosure Act 1817	57 Geo. 3. c. 4 Pr.	23 May 1817
An Act for inclosing Lands in the Parish of Cofton otherwise Coston Hackett in the County of Worcester.
Aspatria, &c. Inclosure Act 1817	57 Geo. 3. c. 5 Pr.	23 May 1817
An Act for repealing certain Parts of an Act of His present Majesty, (Note: Aspatria, Brumfield, and Allhallows Inclosure Act 1812 (52 Geo. 3. c. cxxviii)) for inclosing Lands in the Manor of Aspatria, and in the several Parishes of Aspatria, Brumfield and Allhallows, in the County of Cumberland, and for amending the said Act.
Orleton Inclosure Act 1817	57 Geo. 3. c. 6 Pr.	23 May 1817
An Act for inclosing Lands in the Parish of Orleton in the County of Hereford.
Burton Salmon Inclosure Act 1817	57 Geo. 3. c. 7 Pr.	23 May 1817
An Act for inclosing Lands in the Township of Burton Salmon in the Parish of Monkfrystone, in the County of York.
Willey Inclosure Act 1817	57 Geo. 3. c. 8 Pr.	23 May 1817
An Act for inclosing Lands in the Township of Willey, in the Parish of Presteign, in the County of Hereford.
Gilbert's Estate Act 1817	57 Geo. 3. c. 9 Pr.	16 June 1817
An Act for vesting part of the Settled Estates of Edward Gilbert Esquire, otherwise Edward Scott Esquire, in Trustees, to be sold; and for applying the Produce in or towards the Discharge of the Incumbrances on the said Estates.
Meltham Inclosure Act 1817	57 Geo. 3. c. 10 Pr.	16 June 1817
An Act for inclosing Lands in the Manor of Meltham, in the Parish of Almondbury, in the West Riding of the County of York.
Littlemore Inclosure Act 1817	57 Geo. 3. c. 11 Pr.	16 June 1817
An Act for allotting Lands in the Township or Liberty of Littlemore, in the Parishes of Saint Mary the Virgin and Yeftley, otherwise Iffley, in the County of Oxford.
Easton-on-the-Hill Inclosure Act 1817	57 Geo. 3. c. 12 Pr.	16 June 1817
An Act for inclosing and exonerating from Tithes, Lands in the Parish of Easton on the Hill, in the County of Northampton.
Trawden Inclosure Act 1817	57 Geo. 3. c. 13 Pr.	16 June 1817
An Act for inclosing Lands in the Township of Trawden, in the Chapelry of Colne, and Parish of Whalley, in the County of Lancaster.
Kirkby in Kendal Inclosure Act 1817	57 Geo. 3. c. 14 Pr.	16 June 1817
An Act for inclosing Lands within the Manors, Townships or Divisions of Underbarrow and Bradleyfield in the Parish of Kirkby in Kendal, in the County of Westmoreland.
Seacome's Estate Act 1817	57 Geo. 3. c. 15 Pr.	20 June 1817
An Act for vesting certain Estates, devised by the Will of John Seacome, and now held in undivided Shares in Trustees, to be sold; and for investing the Purchase Monies of the Shares of such of the Parties interested as are Infants in the Purchase of other Estates, to be conveyed to them according to their respective Rights and Interests in lieu of such Shares.
Hickey's Charity Estates Act 1817	57 Geo. 3. c. 16 Pr.	20 June 1817
An Act to enable the Trustees for the time being of the Charity Estates of William Hickey deceased, situate in Richmond, in the County of Surrey, to grant Building and Repairing Leases thereof.
Fish's Estate Act 1817	57 Geo. 3. c. 17 Pr.	20 June 1817
An Act for confirming and establishing the Sales made by Ann Fish Widow, and Frederick Klein, of the Estates devised to them for Sale by the Will of John Fish Esquire.
Ramsdown Inclosure Act 1817	57 Geo. 3. c. 18 Pr.	20 June 1817
An Act for inclosing Ramsdown and Liddaton Down Commons, in the Parish of Milton Abbott in the County of Devon.
Heworth Inclosure Act 1817	57 Geo. 3. c. 19 Pr.	20 June 1817
An Act for dividing and inclosing Heworth Moor in the Manor or Township of Heworth, in the North Riding of the County of York; and for extinguishing the Rights of Stray and Average over certain Lands called Half Year Lands, situate in the Suburbs or Precincts of the City of York.
Fornham Inclosure Act 1817	57 Geo. 3. c. 20 Pr.	20 June 1817
An Act for inclosing and exonerating from Tithes Lands in the Parishes of Fornham Saint Martin and Fornham Saint Genoveve, otherwise Fornham Saint Genovieve, in the County of Suffolk.
Lord Ossulston's Estate Act 1817	57 Geo. 3. c. 21 Pr.	27 June 1817
An Act for vesting in Trustees in Fee Simple, in Trust for Samuel Robert Gauffen Esquire, discharged from certain Entails created therein, and from other Rights and Interests, a Fee Farm Rent of Seven hundred and fifteen Pounds and Eleven pence Three Farthings, heretofore the Estate of the Right Honourable John Lord Oulston deceased.
Scott's Estate Act 1817	57 Geo. 3. c. 22 Pr.	27 June 1817
An Act for vesting the settled Estates of William Lifter Fenton Scott Esquire, in Trustees, in Trust to be sold; and for laying out the Purchase Monies arising from such Sale, in the Purchase of other Estates, to be settled to the same Uses.
Lord Seaforth's Estate Act 1817	57 Geo. 3. c. 23 Pr.	27 June 1817
An Act for empowering the Judges of the Court of Session in Scotland to sell such Parts of the Estates of Seaforth and others, situated in the County of Ross, which were entailed by Francis Lord Seaforth deceased, as shall be sufficient for Payment of the Debts and Provisions which affect or may be made to affect the said entailed Estates, and for granting certain Powers relative to Leases and Feus of Parts of the said entailed Estates.
Schaw's Estate Act 1817	57 Geo. 3. c. 24 Pr.	27 June 1817
An Act to authorize the Trustees of the deceased James Schaw to grant Building Leases, and Feus of certain Parts of the Lands and Barony of Preston, to sell the Superiority thereof, and for other Purposes relating thereto.
Hollington Inclosure Act 1817	57 Geo. 3. c. 25 Pr.	27 June 1817
An Act for inclosing Lands in the Township of Hollington, in the several Parishes of Longford and Brailsford, in the County of Derby.
Fulbrook Inclosure Act 1817	57 Geo. 3. c. 26 Pr.	27 June 1817
An Act for inclosing Lands in the Parish of Fulbrook, in the County of Oxford.
Rocheid's Estate Act 1817	57 Geo. 3. c. 27 Pr.	30 June 1817
An Act to enable James Rocheid Esquire, and the Heirs of Entail succeeding to him in the Estate of Inverleith, to grant Feus thereof upon certain Terms and Conditions.
Earl of Thanet's Estate Act 1817	57 Geo. 3. c. 28 Pr.	7 July 1817
An Act for exchanging an Estate in the County of Kent, belonging to the Earl of Thanet, for an Estate in the same County, devised by the Will of Thomas Holmes.
Blundell's Estate Act 1817	57 Geo. 3. c. 29 Pr.	7 July 1817
An Act for making a Partition of the Estates of Lostock, Anderton, Heaton, Horwich, Rumworth and Adlington, in the County Palatine of Lancaster, of the late Henry Blundell Esquire.
Gell's Estate Act 1817	57 Geo. 3. c. 30 Pr.	7 July 1817
An Act for confirming an Exchange made by Philip Gell Esquire, of certain of the Settled Estates of Philip Gell Esquire deceased, in the County of York, for other Estates in the County of Derby.
Missenden Rectory Act 1817	57 Geo. 3. c. 31 Pr.	7 July 1817
An Act for effectuating an Exchange between Richard Peter Whish Clerk, Rector of the Rectory and Parish Church of Meesden otherwise Missenden, in the County of Hertford, and Armytage Gaussen Esquire, of the Rectory House and Part of the Glebe Lands of the said Rectory, for a House and Lands in the said Parish of Meesden otherwise Missenden, belonging to the said Armytage Gaussen.
Long's Estate Act 1817	57 Geo. 3. c. 32 Pr.	7 July 1817
An Act for vesting certain Estates, devised by the Will of Sir James Tylney Long, in the Counties of Dorset and York, in Trustees, to be sold; and for laying out the Money thence arising (after Payment of certain specific Incumbrances) in the Purchase of other Estates, to be settled in lieu thereof, to the same Uses.
Prebendary of The Moor's (St. Paul's Cathedral) Estate Act 1817	57 Geo. 3. c. 33 Pr.	7 July 1817
An Act to enable the Prebendary of the Prebend of The Moor, in the City of London, founded in the Cathedral Church of Saint Paul in London, to grant a Lease of certain Messuages, Buildings, Lands and Hereditaments, situate in the Parish of Saint Giles without Cripplegate, in the said City, Parcel of the said Prebend, in manner therein mentioned; and to enable the granting of Sub Leases for repairing and otherwise improving the same.
Barlow Inclosure Act 1817	57 Geo. 3. c. 34 Pr.	7 July 1817
An Act for inclosing Lands in the Manor of Barlow, in the Townships of Great Barlow and Little Barlow, in the Parishes of Staveley and Dronfield, in the County of Derby.
Holt Inclosure Act 1817	57 Geo. 3. c. 35 Pr.	7 July 1817
An Act for improving a certain Piece of Land called Common Wood, in the Liberty of the Borough of Holt otherwise Lyons, in the County of Denbigh.
Walkden's Estate Act 1817	57 Geo. 3. c. 36 Pr.	10 July 1817
An Act for vesting a certain Estate, late of Peter Walkden, of Chorley, in the County of Chester, Yeoman, deceased, situate in Chorley aforesaid, in Trustees, in Trust, to be sold, for paying off Incumbrances thereon; and for purchasing other Estates, to be settled to the same Uses.
Bolton Glebe Act 1817	57 Geo. 3. c. 37 Pr.	10 July 1817
An Act to enable the Vicar for the time being of the Parish of Bolton, in the County Palatine of Lancaster, to sell and convey in Fee Simple a certain Portion of the Glebe Land belonging to the Vicarage of Bolton.
Bracebridge's Estate Act 1817	57 Geo. 3. c. 38 Pr.	10 July 1817
An Act for confirming an Agreement relating to the Reversion Expectant of certain Estates in the Counties of Warwick and Chester, late of Sir Lifter Holte Baronet, deceased, and Property belonging to Abraham Bracebridge Esquire; and for vesting such Estates and Property in Trustees, to convey and assure the same according to the said Agreement.
Harbridge Inclosure Act 1817 (Note: This act was not printed by the King's Printer.)	57 Geo. 3. c. 39 Pr.	17 March 1817
An Act for inclosing Lands within the Parish of Harbridge, in the County of Southampton.
Hemmingson's Naturalization Act 1817	57 Geo. 3. c. 40 Pr.	29 March 1817
An Act for naturalizing Ulric Theodore Hemmingson.
Fulstow Inclosure Act 1817	57 Geo. 3. c. 41 Pr.	29 April 1817
An Act for inclosing Lands in the Parish of Fulstow, in the County of Lincoln.
Portsea Inclosure Act 1817	57 Geo. 3. c. 42 Pr.	23 May 1817
An Act for inclosing Lands in the Parish of Portsea, in the County of Southampton.
Studley Inclosure Act 1817	57 Geo. 3. c. 43 Pr.	23 May 1817
An Act for inclosing Lands in the Parish of Studley, in the County of Warwick.
Worsbrough Inclosure Act 1817	57 Geo. 3. c. 44 Pr.	23 May 1817
An Act for inclosing Lands in the Township of Worsbrough, in the County of York.
Emneth Inclosure Act 1817	57 Geo. 3. c. 45 Pr.	23 May 1817
An Act for inclosing Lands in the Parish of Emneth, in the County of Norfolk
Hanley Castle Inclosure Act 1817	57 Geo. 3. c. 46 Pr.	23 May 1817
An Act to amend and render more effectual an Act made in the Thirty-fifth Year of His present Majesty, (Note: Hanley Castle Inclosure Act 1795 (35 Geo. 3. c. 2 Pr.)) for inclosing the Commonable Lands in the Parish of Hanley Castle, in the County of Worcester.
Hempnall Inclosure Act 1817	57 Geo. 3. c. 47 Pr.	23 May 1817
An Act for inclosing Lands in the Parish of Hempnall, in the County of Norfolk.
Garden's Estate Act 1817	57 Geo. 3. c. 48 Pr.	16 June 1817
An Act for vesting certain Parts of the Barony of Pitsligo, in the County of Aberdeen, comprized in a Deed of Entail executed by Francis Garden of Troup Esquire, deceased, in Trustees to be sold and for applying the Purchase Money in the Acquisition of other Estates, to be settled upon the same Series of Heirs, and under the Conditions and Limitations contained in the said Deed of Entail.
Cadell's Estate Act 1817	57 Geo. 3. c. 49 Pr.	16 June 1817
An Act for empowering the Judges of the Court of Session in Scotland to sell such Parts of the Entailed Estate of Tranent, and others in the Constabulary of Haddington and Sheriffdom of Edinburgh, belonging to William Cadell Esquire, as shall be sufficient for Payment of the Debts affecting the same.
Salt and Enson Inclosure Act 1817	57 Geo. 3. c. 50 Pr.	16 June 1817
An Act for inclosing Lands in the Manor of Salt and Enson, in the Parish of Saint Mary, in the Borough of Stafford.
Beadlam Inclosure Act 1817	57 Geo. 3. c. 51 Pr.	16 June 1817
An Act for inclosing and exonerating from Tithes Lands in the Township of Beadlam, in the Parish of Helmsley, in the North Riding of the County of York.
Bailey's Divorce Act 1817	57 Geo. 3. c. 52 Pr.	16 June 1817
An Act to dissolve the Marriage of William Morris Bailey Esquire, Major in His Majesty's Thirtieth Regiment of Foot, and a Lieutenant Colonel in the Army, and Companion of the Most Honourable Order of the Bath, with Henrietta Bailey his now Wife, and to enable him to marry again; and for other Purposes therein mentioned.
Sir Edward Owen's Divorce Act 1817	57 Geo. 3. c. 53 Pr.	16 June 1817
An Act to dissolve the Marriage of Sir Edward William Campbell Rich Owen with Dame Elizabeth Owen his now Wife, and to enable him to marry again; and for other Purposes therein mentioned.
Emery's Estate Act 1817	57 Geo. 3. c. 54 Pr.	20 June 1817
An Act to exonerate from Portions certain Hereditaments in Waters Upton, in the County of Salop, belonging to Richard Emery Esquire.
Rector of Clapham's Glebe Act 1817	57 Geo. 3. c. 55 Pr.	20 June 1817
An Act to enable the Rector of the Parish and Parish Church of Clapham, in the County of Surrey, to accept a Surrender of the existing Lease, and to grant more extensive Leases of Part of the Glebe belonging to the said Rectory.
Leek Wootton Inclosure Act 1817	57 Geo. 3. c. 56 Pr.	20 June 1817
An Act for inclosing Lands in the Parish of Leek Wootton, in the County of Warwick.
Smith's Divorce Act 1817	57 Geo. 3. c. 57 Pr.	20 June 1817
An Act to dissolve the Marriage of Richard Oliver Smith Esquire with Harriet his now Wife, and to enable him to marry again; and for other Purposes therein mentioned.
Seyzinger's Naturalization Act 1817	57 Geo. 3. c. 58 Pr.	20 June 1817
An Act for naturalizing Matthew Seyzinger.
Murray's Estate Act 1817	57 Geo. 3. c. 59 Pr.	27 June 1817
An Act for empowering the Judges of the Court of Session to sell the Entailed Estate of Pitlochie, lying in the County of Fife, belonging to William Murray Esquire, of Touchadam and Pitlochie, and to apply the Money to arise by such Sale in the Purchase of the Lands and Estate of Cockspow, in the County of Stirling, belonging to the said William Murray, in Fee Simple, and lying contiguous to certain other Entailed Estates belonging to the said William Murray, to be entailed in lieu of the said Estate of Pitlochie.
Strensham Inclosure Act 1817	57 Geo. 3. c. 60 Pr.	27 June 1817
An Act to amend an Act made in the Fifty fourth Year of His present Majesty, (Note: Strensham (Worcestershire) Inclosure Act 1814 (54 Geo. 3. c. 46 Pr.)) for inclosing Lands in the Parish of Strensham, in the County of Worcester.
Marquis of Queensberry's Estate Act 1817	57 Geo. 3. c. 61 Pr.	7 July 1817
An Act for settling and securing certain Parts of the Lands and Estate of Kinninmonth or Kinmount and others, in the County of Dumfries, to and in favour of Charles Marquis of Queensberry, and the Series of Heirs entitled to take by a certain Deed of Entail made by Charles Duke of Queensberry and Dover, deceased, and under the Conditions and Limitations contained in the said Deed; and for vesting in lieu thereof certain Parts of the Lands and Barony of Tinwall, Mousewald, and others in the said County, in the said Charles Marquis of Queensberry, and his Heirs and Assigns, in Fee Simple.
Beevor's Name Act 1817	57 Geo. 3. c. 62 Pr.	7 July 1817
An Act to enable Edward Beevor the Elder, Esquire, and his Issue, to take, use and bear the Surname and Arms of Lombe, pursuant to the Will of Sir John Lombe Baronet, deceased.
Llandilofawr, &c. Inclosure Act 1817	57 Geo. 3. c. 63 Pr.	10 July 1817
An Act for inclosing Lands in the several Parishes of Llandilofawr and Talley, in the County of Carmarthen.
Dyott's Divorce Act 1817	57 Geo. 3. c. 64 Pr.	10 July 1817
An Act to explain and amend an Act passed in the last Session of Parliament, intituled "An Act to dissolve the Marriage of Lieutenant General William Dyott with Elinor other wife Eleanor his now Wife, and to enable him to marry again; and for other Purposes therein mentioned." (Note: William Dyott's Divorce Act 1816 (56 Geo. 3. c. 76 Pr.))

=== Sources ===
- The Statutes of the United Kingdom of Great Britain and Ireland, 57 George III. 1817. London. 1817 – via Google Books.
- Journals of the House of Commons. Vol. 72. London: His Majesty's Stationery Office – via Google Books.

== See also ==
- List of acts of the Parliament of the United Kingdom
