= Treason Felony Act 1848 =

Act of the Parliament of the United Kingdom

Treason Felony Act 1848 (Note: The citation of this act by this short title was authorised by section 5 of, and the second schedule to, the Statute Law Revision Act 1948. Due to the repeal of those provisions, it is now authorised by section 19(2) of the Interpretation Act 1978.)
- Act of Parliament
- Parliament of the United Kingdom
- Long title: An Act for the better Security of the Crown and Government of the United Kingdom.
- Citation: 11 & 12 Vict. c. 12
- Territorial extent: United Kingdom

Dates
- Royal assent: 22 April 1848
- Commencement: 22 April 1848 (Note: Section 1.)
Other legislation
Amended by	Statute Law Revision Act 1875; Costs in Criminal Cases Act 1908; Indictments Act 1915; Statute Law Revision Act 1950; Criminal Law Act 1967; Crime and Disorder Act 1998
Relates to	Sedition Act 1661; Treason Act 1695; Treason Act 1795

Status: Amended

Text of statute as originally enacted

Revised text of statute as amended

Text of the Treason Felony Act 1848 as in force today (including any amendments) within the United Kingdom, from legislation.gov.uk.

The Treason Felony Act 1848 (11 & 12 Vict. c. 12) is an act of the Parliament of the United Kingdom. Parts of the act are still in force. It is a law which protects the King and the Crown.

The offences in the act were originally high treason under the Sedition Act 1661 (13 Cha. 2 St. 1. c. 1) (later the Treason Act 1795 (36 Geo. 3. c. 7)), and consequently the penalty was death. However it was found that juries were often reluctant to convict people of capital crimes, and it was thought that the conviction rate might increase if the sentence was reduced to exile to the penal colonies in Australia (the penalty is now life imprisonment). Consequently, in 1848, three categories of treason (all derived from the 1795 Act) were reduced to felonies. (This occurred during a period when the death penalty in the United Kingdom was being abolished for a great many offences.) The act does not prevent prosecutors from charging somebody with treason instead of treason felony if the same conduct amounts to both offences.

It is treason felony to "compass, imagine, invent, devise, or intend":

- to deprive the Sovereign of his crown,
- to levy war against the Sovereign, or
- to "move or stir" any foreigner to invade the United Kingdom or any other country belonging to the Sovereign.

== Punishment and procedure ==
Treason felony is an indictable-only offence. It is punishable with imprisonment for life or any shorter term.

Despite the name, it is no longer a felony, as the distinction between felony and misdemeanour was abolished by the Criminal Law Act 1967.

In Northern Ireland, a person charged with treason felony may not be admitted to bail except by order of the High Court or of the Secretary of State.

=== Scottish Parliament ===
Treason felony is a reserved matter on which the Scottish Parliament cannot legislate.

== Text ==
Section 3 of the act provides:

3. Offences herein mentioned declared to be felonies

If any person whatsoever shall, within the United Kingdom or without, compass, imagine, invent, devise, or intend to deprive or depose our Most Gracious Lady the Queen, from the style, honour, or royal name of the imperial crown of the United Kingdom, or of any other of her Majesty's dominions and countries, or to levy war against her Majesty, within any part of the United Kingdom, in order by force or constraint to compel her to change her measures or counsels, or in order to put any force or constraint upon or in order to intimidate or overawe both Houses or either House of Parliament, or to move or stir any foreigner or stranger with force to invade the United Kingdom or any other of her Majesty's dominions or countries under the obeisance of her Majesty, and such compassings, imaginations, inventions, devices, or intentions, or any of them, shall express, utter, or declare, by publishing any printing or writing ... or by any overt act or deed, every person so offending shall be guilty of felony, and being convicted thereof shall be liable ... to be transported beyond the seas for the term of his or her natural life.

The ellipses represent words that have subsequently been repealed.

Section 10 of the Interpretation Act 1978 says that references to the Sovereign reigning at the time of the passing of the Treason Felony Act are to be construed as references to the Sovereign for the time being.

== Repealed provisions ==
Penal transportation was abolished by the Penal Servitude Act 1857, leaving penal servitude for life as the maximum sentence. The last persons sentenced to transportation were transported in 1868. Penal servitude itself was abolished and replaced with imprisonment by the Criminal Justice Act 1948.

Section 4 of the act contained strict rules about treason felony when committed only by speaking. A conviction required a confession in open court, or the evidence of two witnesses to prove the words spoken. Also a prosecution had to be brought within six days of the offence. Section 4 was repealed by the Statute Law Revision Act 1891.

Section 3 of the Regency Act 1910 (10 Edw. 7 & 1 Geo. 5 c. 26) prohibited anyone from marrying the Sovereign while he was under 18 without the Regent's permission, and stated that anyone who married or was concerned in a marriage in contravention of that section "shall be guilty of a felony under the Treason Felony Act, 1848". No regency occurred under the 1910 act, which has since been repealed.

== In the 21st century ==
In 2001, The Guardian newspaper mounted an unsuccessful legal challenge to the act in the High Court, alleging that the act "makes it a criminal offence, punishable by life imprisonment, to advocate abolition of the monarchy in print, even by peaceful means". They sought a declaration that the Human Rights Act 1998 had altered its meaning so that only violent conduct was criminal. The court held that this was a hypothetical question that did not deserve an answer, since The Guardian was not being prosecuted. The case eventually went to the House of Lords on appeal in 2003. In a unanimous judgment, the Lords agreed that the litigation was unnecessary; but the judges nevertheless agreed with Lord Steyn's view that

[T]he part of section 3 of the 1848 Act which appears to criminalise the advocacy of republicanism is a relic of a bygone age and does not fit into the fabric of our modern legal system. The idea that section 3 could survive scrutiny under the Human Rights Act is unreal.

In December 2013, the Ministry of Justice said that Section 3 of the act, which had made it an offence punishable by life imprisonment to print, or otherwise "by any overt act or deed" to support the abolition of the monarchy or to "imagine, invent, devise, or intend to deprive or depose" the monarch, had been repealed in early 2013, without publicity. However, the Government later stated that the announcement that it had been repealed was wrong, and that it was still on the statute book.

== Relevant cases ==
- R v Mitchel (1848) 7 State Tr NS 599
- R v Cuffey (1848) 7 State Tr NS 467, 12 JP 648
- R v Meany (1867) 10 Cox CC 506, IR 1 CL 500
- Mulcahy v R (1868) LR 3 HL 306
- R v Davitt (1870) 11 Cox CC 676
- R v Deasy (1883) 15 Cox CC 334

The last reported case under the act in the United Kingdom was in 1883, although the act was used in Australia in 1916 to prosecute the "Sydney Twelve".

In 1972 three Irish republicans—Joseph Callinan, Louis Marcantonio and Thomas Quinn—were initially charged with treason felony, although this was later dropped in favour of lesser charges of seditious utterances.

== Subsequent developments ==
Section 5 of the act was repealed by section 1(1) of, and the first schedule to, the Statute Law Revision Act 1950 (14 Geo. 6. c. 6), which came into force on 23 May 1950.

Section 8 of the act was repealed for England and Wales by section 10(2) of, and part III of schedule 3 to, the Criminal Law Act 1967, which came into force on 1 January 1968.

== Parliamentary debates ==
- Hansard (House of Commons), 10 April 1848, vol. 98, col. 20–59 (first reading)
- Hansard (House of Commons), 10 April 1848, vol. 98, col. 74–135 (second reading)
- Hansard (House of Commons), 11 April 1848, vol. 98, col. 153–175 (motion to go into committee)
- Hansard (House of Commons), 12 April 1848, vol. 98, col. 223–259 (motion to go into committee)
- Hansard (House of Commons), 14 April 1848, vol. 98, col. 341–379 (committee)
- Hansard (House of Commons), 17 April 1848, vol. 98, col. 417–431 (report)
- Hansard (House of Commons), 18 April 1848, vol. 98, col. 453–479 (third reading)
- Hansard (House of Lords), 18 April 1848, vol. 98, col. 447 (first reading)
- Hansard (House of Lords), 19 April 1848, vol. 98, col. 486–507 (second reading)
- Hansard (House of Lords), 20 April 1848, vol. 98, col. 534–537 (third reading)
- Hansard (House of Lords), 22 April 1848, vol. 98 (royal assent)

== See also ==
- John Mitchel, the first person convicted of treason felony
- Michael Davitt and the Sydney Twelve, people convicted of treason felony
- John Jervis (judge), attorney-general who drafted the act
- Capital punishment in the United Kingdom
- High treason in the United Kingdom
- Treason Act
- Republicanism in the United Kingdom
