= Lunacy (Ireland) Act 1821 =

Act of the Parliament of the United Kingdom

Lunacy (Ireland) Act 1821 (Note: The citation of this act by this short title was authorised by section 1 of, and the first schedule to, the Short Titles Act 1896. Due to the repeal of those provisions it is now authorised by section 19(2) of the Interpretation Act 1978.)
- Act of Parliament
- Parliament of the United Kingdom
- Long title: An Act to make more effectual Provision for the Establishment of Asylums for the Lunatic Poor, and for the Custody of Insane Persons charged with Offences in Ireland.
- Citation: 1 & 2 Geo. 4. c. 33
- Territorial extent: Ireland (Note: Long title.)

Dates
- Royal assent: 28 May 1821
- Commencement: 7 June 1821 (Note: Section 1.)
- Repealed: Northern Ireland: 2 April 1962 (Note: The Mental Health Act 1961 (Commencement No. 2) Order (Northern Ireland) 1962 (SI 1962/246 (N.I.)).); Republic of Ireland: 30 December 2015
Other legislation
| Repeals/revokes | Irish Lunatic Asylums for the Poor Act 1817 |
| Amended by | Statute Law Revision Act 1873; Statute Law Revision Act 1888; Statute Law Revision Act 1890; Trial of Lunatics Act 1883 |
| Repealed by | Northern Ireland: Mental Health (Northern Ireland) Act 1961; Republic of Ireland: Assisted Decision Making (Capacity) Act 2015 |

Status: Repealed

Text of statute as originally enacted

The Lunacy (Ireland) Act 1821 (1 & 2 Geo. 4. c. 33) was an act of the Parliament of the United Kingdom which formed the basis of mental health law in Ireland from 1821 until 2015.

== Background ==
Prior to the act, there had been only limited progress with establishing specialist accommodation for the mentally ill in Ireland. The only such facilities were the Eglinton Asylum in Cork and the Richmond Asylum in Dublin.

== Provisions ==
The act authorised the appointment of a Commission of General Control and Correspondence to have oversight of asylums in Ireland. It also gave powers to the Lord Lieutenant of Ireland to establish and operate publicly funded "district asylums" across the island of Ireland.

== Subsequent legislation ==
Although the act made some changes relating to Commissioners in Lunacy, the management of the Estates of Lunatics and for the protection of the property of Lunatics in Ireland, aspects of the legislation remained in force until repealed in the Republic of Ireland by the Assisted Decision Making (Capacity) Act 2015.

The whole act was repealed for Northern Ireland by section 116(2) of, and schedule 7 to, the Mental Health Act (Northern Ireland) 1961, which came into force on 2 April 1962.
