= Compass (law) =

In law, to purpose (or intend) something

In law, to compass is to purpose (or intend) something. It is an individual that is imagining something or to plot a plan. Compassing signifies a purpose (or design) of the mind (or will), and not carrying such design to effect.
