= List of ordinances of the Legislative Council of Western Australia from 1837 =

This is a list of ordinances of the Legislative Council of Western Australia for the year 1837.

== 1837 ==
Short title, or popular name	Citation	Royal assent
Long title
	7 Will. IV. No. 1	17 January, 1837
An Act to renew and make perpetual "An Act to regulate the Establishment and Management of Ferries, and the Collection of Tolls thereat:" (Note: 4 Will. IV. No. 1) and to indemnify Persons who may have collected Tolls or acted in the Management of Ferries subsequent to the thirty-first of December, One Thousand Eight Hundred and Thirty Six.
	7 Will. IV. No. 2	24 January 1837
An Act to adopt an Act passed in the eleventh year of the Reign of His late Majesty King George the Fourth, and the first year of His Majesty King William the Fourth, intituled "An Act to repeal so much of an Act of the sixtieth year of His late Majesty King George the Third (Note: Criminal Libel Act 1819 (60 Geo. 3 & 1 Geo. 4. c. 8 (Imp))) for the more effectual prevention and punishment of Blasphemous and Seditious Libels, as relates to the Sentence of Banishment for the second Offence, and to provide some further remedy against the abuse of publishing Libels;" (Note: Libels Act 1830 (11 Geo. 4 & 1 Will. 4. c. 73 (Imp))) and to render operative such of the Provisions of the following Acts of the Imperial Parliament, as relate to the regulations for the Printing and Publication of Newspapers, and other, Papers of a like nature, and to the remedies against the abuse of publishing Libels.—viz., An Act of Parliament passed in the 38th year of the reign of His Majesty King George the Third, intituled "An Act for preventing the Mischiefs arising from the printing and publishing Newspapers, and Papers of a like nature, by persons not known, and for regulating the printing and publication of such Papers in other respects;" (Note: Newspaper Publication Act 1798 (38 Geo. 3. c. 78 (Imp))) and An Act of Parliament passed in the sixtieth year of the reign of King George the Third, and the first year of the reign of King George the Fourth, intituled "An Act for the more effectual prevention and punishment of Blasphemous and Seditious Libels;" and An Act, passed in the sixtieth year of the reign of King George the Third, and the first year of the reign of King George the Fourth, intituled "An Act to subject certain Publications to the Duties of Stamps upon Newspapers, and to make other regulations for restraining the Abuses arising from the Publication of Blasphemous and Seditious Libels." (Note: Newspapers, etc. Act 1819 (60 Geo. 3 & 1 Geo. 4. c. 9 (Imp)))
	7 Will. IV. No. 3	10 July 1837
An Act to regulate the Establishment of Banking Companies in the Colony of Western Australia; and to enable the proprietors of such Companies to sue and be sued in the name of any one of their Public Officers.

== Sources ==
- "legislation.wa.gov.au".
