= Statute Law (Repeals) Act 2008 =

Act of the Parliament of the United Kingdom

Statute Law (Repeals) Act 2008 (Note: Section 3.)
- Act of Parliament
- Parliament of the United Kingdom
- Long title: An Act to promote the reform of the statute law by the repeal, in accordance with recommendations of the Law Commission and the Scottish Law Commission, of certain enactments which (except in so far as their effect is preserved) are no longer of practical utility, and to make other provision in connection with the repeal of those enactments.
- Citation: 2008 c. 12
- Introduced by: Michael Wills MP, Minister of State for Justice (Commons); Lord Hunt of Kings Heath (Lords)
- Territorial extent: England and Wales; Scotland; Northern Ireland; Isle of Man; (Note: Section 2.)

Dates
- Royal assent: 21 July 2008
- Commencement: 21 July 2008 (Note: Section 4(b) of the Interpretation Act 1978.)
Other legislation
Amends	Customs Consolidation Act 1876; Finance Act 1901; Naval and Military War Pensions &c. (Administrative Expenses) Act 1917; Currency and Bank Notes Act 1928; See § Repealed enactments
Repeals/revokes	See § Repealed enactments
Relates to	See Statute Law (Repeals) Act

Status: Current legislation

History of passage through Parliament

Text of statute as originally enacted

Revised text of statute as amended

The Statute Law (Repeals) Act 2008 (c. 12) is an act of the Parliament of the United Kingdom which repealed more than 250 acts of Parliament in full, and more than 50 in part.

== Background ==
In January 2008 the Law Commission and the Scottish Law Commission jointly published their eighteenth Statute Law Repeals Report, which consisted largely of a draft bill which became this act. The report recommended the repeal of statute law which the commissions considered "spent, obsolete, unnecessary or otherwise not now of practical utility".

The act implemented recommendations contained in the eighteenth report on statute law revision, by the Law Commission and the Scottish Law Commission.

== Provisions ==
This repeal act was notable in particular as it repealed (except as it extends to Northern Ireland) the last remaining portion of the Six Acts, the Unlawful Drilling Act 1819 (60 Geo. 3 & 1 Geo. 4. c. 1), which was introduced after the Peterloo Massacre to prevent assemblies.

The act repealed legislation including:

- the Servants' Characters Act 1792 (32 Geo. 3. c. 56)
- 50 acts relating to county gaols and the introduction of turnpike roads

In total, the act repealed 260 acts.

=== Repealed enactments ===
Section 1(1) of the act repealed 320 enactments, listed in schedule 1 to the act.

==== Part 1 — Armed Forces ====
Part 1 — Armed Forces
Citation	Short title	Extent of repeal
Group 1 – Royal Naval School
3 & 4 Vict. c. lxxxvi	Royal Naval School Act 1840	The whole act.
8 & 9 Vict. c. xxii	Royal Naval School Act 1845	The whole act.
14 & 15 Vict. c. xxix	Royal Naval School Amendment Act 1851	The whole act.
23 & 24 Vict. c. civ	Royal Naval School Act 1860	The whole act.
53 & 54 Vict. c. viii	Royal Naval School (New Cross) Disused Chapel Site Act 1890	The whole act.
Group 2 – Greenwich Hospital
46 & 47 Vict. c. 32	Greenwich Hospital Act 1883	In section 3, the words "and Royal Naval Artillery Volunteer Force".
5 & 6 Geo. 6. c. 35	Greenwich Hospital Act 1942	Section 1(3).
10 & 11 Geo. 6. c. 5	Greenwich Hospital Act 1947	The whole act.
1967 c. 74	Greenwich Hospital Act 1967	Section 1(2).
1967 c. 74	Greenwich Hospital Act 1967	Section 2.
Group 3 – Military Lands
56 & 57 Vict. c. xxxvii	Military Lands Provisional Orders Confirmation Act 1893	The whole act.
58 & 59 Vict. c. xxv	Military Lands Provisional Orders Confirmation Act 1895	The whole act.
59 Vict. Sess. 2. c. xv	Military Lands Provisional Order Confirmation (No. 2) Act 1895 (Session 2)	The whole act.
61 & 62 Vict. c. lxxxix	Military Lands Provisional Orders Confirmation Act 1898	The whole act.
61 & 62 Vict. c. ccxiv	Military Lands Provisional Orders Confirmation (No. 2) Act 1898	The whole act.
62 & 63 Vict. c. cxxxiii	Military Lands Provisional Order Confirmation Act 1899	The whole act.
63 & 64 Vict. c. i	Military Lands Provisional Order Confirmation Act 1900	The whole act.
1 Edw. 7. c. xxxii	Military Lands Provisional Orders Confirmation Act 1901	The whole act.
1 Edw. 7. c. clvii	Military Lands Provisional Orders Confirmation (No. 2) Act 1901	The whole act.
1 Edw. 7. c. clx	Naval Works Provisional Order Confirmation Act 1901	The whole act.
2 Edw. 7. c. i	Military Lands Provisional Orders Confirmation (No. 1) Act 1902	The whole act.
2 Edw. 7. c. lxxiii	Military Lands Provisional Order Confirmation (No. 2) Act 1902	The whole act.
3 Edw. 7. c. lxvii	Naval Works Provisional Order Confirmation Act 1903	The whole act.
3 Edw. 7. c. lxxxiv	Military Lands Provisional Orders Confirmation Act 1903	The whole act.
1 & 2 Geo. 5. c. iv	Military Lands Provisional Order (1910) Confirmation Act 1911	The whole act.
2 & 3 Geo. 5. c. cxvii	Military Lands Provisional Order Confirmation Act 1912	The whole act.
Group 4 – General repeals
7 Geo. 4. c. 16	Chelsea and Kilmainham Hospitals Act 1826	Section 3.
7 Geo. 4. c. 16	Chelsea and Kilmainham Hospitals Act 1826	Sections 10 and 11.
7 Geo. 4. c. 16	Chelsea and Kilmainham Hospitals Act 1826	Section 13.
7 Geo. 4. c. 16	Chelsea and Kilmainham Hospitals Act 1826	Section 23.
7 Geo. 4. c. 16	Chelsea and Kilmainham Hospitals Act 1826	Section 27.
7 Geo. 4. c. 16	Chelsea and Kilmainham Hospitals Act 1826	Section 31.
7 Geo. 4. c. 16	Chelsea and Kilmainham Hospitals Act 1826	Section 34.
7 Geo. 4. c. 16	Chelsea and Kilmainham Hospitals Act 1826	In section 46, the words ", in case the same shall amount to or exceed the sum of two hundred pounds,".
7 Geo. 4. c. 16	Chelsea and Kilmainham Hospitals Act 1826	Sections 47 and 48.
3 & 4 Will. 4. c. 29	Army (Artillery, etc.) Pensions Act 1833	The whole act.
1 & 2 Vict. c. 89	Drouly Fund Act 1838	The whole act.
44 & 45 Vict. c. 58	Army Act 1881	The whole act.
53 & 54 Vict. c. 25	Barracks Act 1890	The whole act.
6 Edw. 7. c. 5	Seamen's and Soldiers' False Characters Act 1906	The whole act.
4 & 5 Geo. 5. c. 30	Injuries in War (Compensation) Act 1914	The whole act.
5 & 6 Geo. 5. c. 18	Injuries in War (Compensation) Act 1914 (Session 2)	The whole act.
5 & 6 Geo. 5. c. 83	Naval and Military War Pensions &c. Act 1915	The whole act (except as it extends to the Isle of Man).
6 & 7 Geo. 5. c. 60	Sailors and Soldiers (Gifts for Land Settlement) Act 1916	The whole act.
9 & 10 Geo. 5. c. 53	War Pensions (Administrative Provisions) Act 1919	Section 1.
11 & 12 Geo. 5. c. 39	Admiralty Pensions Act 1921	Section 2(3).
7 & 8 Geo. 6. c. 23	Finance Act 1944	Section 46.
10 & 11 Geo. 6. c. 19	Polish Resettlement Act 1947	Section 7.
1971 c. 56	Pensions (Increase) Act 1971	In Schedule 2, in Part 1, paragraph 36.
1981 c. 19	Statute Law (Repeals) Act 1981	In Schedule 2, paragraph 4.
2003 c. 1	Income Tax (Earnings and Pensions) Act 2003	Section 641(1)(e).
2003 c. 44	Criminal Justice Act 2003	In Schedule 25, paragraph 14.
2003 c. 44	Criminal Justice Act 2003	In Schedule 32, paragraph 152.

==== Part 2 — County Goals ====
Part 2 — County Gaols
Citation	Short title	Extent of repeal
Group 1 – Buckinghamshire
10 Geo. 2. c. 10	Aylesbury Gaol and Shire Hall: Rate in Bucks Act 1736	The whole act.
Group 2 – Cambridgeshire
1 Geo. 4. c. lxxvii	Ely Sessions House and House of Correction Act 1820	The whole act.
7 & 8 Geo. 4. c. cxi	Cambridge Gaol Act 1827	The whole act.
2 & 3 Vict. c. ix	Cambridge Gaol Act 1839	The whole act.
Group 3 – Cheshire
28 Geo. 3. c. 82	Chester Improvement Act 1788	The whole act.
47 Geo. 3. Sess. 2. c. vi	Chester Castle Gaol and other Buildings Act 1807	The whole act.
Group 4 – Cumbria
17 Geo. 3. c. 54	Westmorland Gaol, etc. Act 1776	The whole act.
Group 5 – Devon
26 Geo. 2. c. 57	Debtors' Prison, Devonshire Act 1753	The whole act.
27 Geo. 3. c. 59	Devon Gaol Act 1787	The whole act.
50 Geo. 3. c. lxxxv	Devon County Gaol Act 1810	The whole act.
58 Geo. 3. c. li	Exeter Gaol Act 1818	The whole act.
26 & 27 Vict. c. lxxiii	Exeter Gaol Act 1863	The whole act.
Group 6 – Essex
13 Geo. 3. c. 35	Essex Gaol Act 1772	The whole act.
1 & 2 Geo. 4. c. cii	Essex Gaols Act 1821	The whole act.
7 & 8 Geo. 4. c. x	Essex Prisons Act 1827	The whole act.
Group 7 – Gloucestershire
21 Geo. 3. c. 74	Gloucester Gaol Act 1781	Sections 1 to 40.
21 Geo. 3. c. 74	Gloucester Gaol Act 1781	Sections 64 to 75.
21 Geo. 3. c. 74	Gloucester Gaol Act 1781	Schedule.
25 Geo. 3. c. 10	Gloucester Gaol Act 1785	The whole act.
53 Geo. 3. c. clxxx	Tewkesbury Gaol Act 1813	The whole act.
Group 8 – Greater London
7 Geo. 3. c. 37	Thames Embankment Act 1766	Sections 4 to 10.
18 Geo. 3. c. 48	Newgate Gaol and Sessions House Act 1778	The whole act.
25 Geo. 3. c. 97	City of London Improvement Act 1785	The whole act.
26 Geo. 3. c. 55	Middlesex Gaol Act 1786	The whole act.
31 Geo. 3. c. 22	Surrey Gaol Act 1791	The whole act.
44 Geo. 3. c. lxxxiv	London Debtors' Prisons Act 1804	The whole act.
52 Geo. 3. c. ccix	Debtors' Prison for London and Middlesex Act 1812	The whole act.
55 Geo. 3. c. xcviii	Debtors' Prison for London and Middlesex Act 1815	The whole act.
Group 9 – Hampshire
41 Geo. 3. c. cxxxii	Winchester Gaol Act 1801	The whole act.
45 Geo. 3. c. xliv	Portsmouth Gaol Act 1805	The whole act.
Group 10 – Hertfordshire
12 & 13 Will. 3. c. 21 Pr.	Removal of Hertford Gaol Act 1700	The whole act.
15 Geo. 3. c. 25	Hertford Prison Act 1775	The whole act.
Group 11 – Norfolk
3 Geo. 4. c. iv	Norfolk County Gaol Act 1822	The whole act.
Group 12 – Northamptonshire
2 & 3 Vict. c. lxvii	Peterborough and Nassaburgh Gaol Act 1839	The whole act.
Group 13 – Northumberland
1 & 2 Geo. 4. c. ii	Northumberland Gaol and County Offices Act 1821	The whole act.
3 Geo. 4. c. lv	Newcastle-upon-Tyne Gaol Act 1822	The whole act.
Group 14 – Pembrokeshire
19 Geo. 3. c. 46	Pembroke Gaol Act 1779	The whole act.
Group 15 – Somerset
56 Geo. 3. c. lix	Bristol Gaol Act 1816	The whole act.
Group 16 – Staffordshire
27 Geo. 3. c. 60	Stafford Gaol Act 1787	The whole act.
Group 17 – Warwickshire
8 Geo. 3. c. 40	Coventry Gaol Act 1768	The whole act.
17 Geo. 3. c. 58	Warwick Gaol Act 1777	The whole act.
Group 18 – West Sussex
27 Geo. 3. c. 58	Sussex Gaol Act 1787	The whole act.
Group 19 – Wiltshire
39 & 40 Geo. 3. c. liii	New Sarum Gaol Act 1800	The whole act.

==== Part 3 — Criminal Law ====
Part 3 — Criminal Law
Citation	Short title	Extent of repeal
25 Geo. 2. c. 36	Disorderly Houses Act 1751	The whole act.
32 Geo. 3. c. 56	Servants' Characters Act 1792	The whole act.
60 Geo. 3 & 1 Geo. 4. c. 1	Unlawful Drilling Act 1819	The whole act (except as it extends to Northern Ireland).
7 Will. 4 & 1 Vict. c. 91	Punishment of Offences Act 1837	The whole act.
33 & 34 Vict. c. 90	Foreign Enlistment Act 1870	Section 3.
38 & 39 Vict. c. 86	Conspiracy, and Protection of Property Act 1875	The whole act.
11 & 12 Geo. 6. c. 58	Criminal Justice Act 1948	Section 69.
11 & 12 Geo. 6. c. 58	Criminal Justice Act 1948	Section 78.
11 & 12 Geo. 6. c. 58	Criminal Justice Act 1948	Schedule 8.
4 & 5 Eliz. 2. c. 69	Sexual Offences Act 1956	In section 35(2), the words from "(whether" to "1885)".
4 & 5 Eliz. 2. c. 69	Sexual Offences Act 1956	In section 35(3), the words from "or was so convicted" to "commencement of this Act," and from "or under subsection (1)" to the end.
4 & 5 Eliz. 2. c. 69	Sexual Offences Act 1956	In section 52(1), the proviso.
7 & 8 Eliz. 2. c. lii	London County Council (General Powers) Act 1959	In section 3(1), the definition "the Act of 1751".
1972 c. 71	Criminal Justice Act 1972	Section 31.
1972 c. 71	Criminal Justice Act 1972	Section 59.
1972 c. 71	Criminal Justice Act 1972	In section 66(6), the proviso.
1972 c. 71	Criminal Justice Act 1972	In section 66(7)(a), the words "section 31" to "1950,".
1980 c. 43	Magistrates' Courts Act 1980	In Schedule 1, paragraph 2.
1982 c. 48	Criminal Justice Act 1982	Section 28.
1982 c. 48	Criminal Justice Act 1982	Sections 30 and 31.
1982 c. 48	Criminal Justice Act 1982	Section 68(1).
1982 c. 48	Criminal Justice Act 1982	Section 72(3).
1982 c. 48	Criminal Justice Act 1982	Schedule 12.
1983 c. 18	Nuclear Material (Offences) Act 1983	Section 4(1)(a).
1983 c. 18	Nuclear Material (Offences) Act 1983	Section 5A.
1985 c. 23	Prosecution of Offences Act 1985	Sections 12 and 13.
1985 c. 23	Prosecution of Offences Act 1985	Section 15(7).
1985 c. 23	Prosecution of Offences Act 1985	Section 28.
1985 c. 23	Prosecution of Offences Act 1985	Section 31(4).
1988 c. 33	Criminal Justice Act 1988	Section 49.
1988 c. 33	Criminal Justice Act 1988	Section 64.
1988 c. 33	Criminal Justice Act 1988	Section 100.
1988 c. 33	Criminal Justice Act 1988	Section 103.
1988 c. 33	Criminal Justice Act 1988	Section 123(1) and (5).
1988 c. 33	Criminal Justice Act 1988	Section 125.
1988 c. 33	Criminal Justice Act 1988	Schedule 5.
1988 c. 33	Criminal Justice Act 1988	In Schedule 8, Part 2.
1991 c. 53	Criminal Justice Act 1991	Section 69.
1991 c. 53	Criminal Justice Act 1991	Section 72.
1993 c. 50	Statute Law (Repeals) Act 1993	In Schedule 2, in Part 1, paragraph 1.
1995 c. 44	Statute Law (Repeals) Act 1995	In Schedule 2, paragraph 1(a) and the words "Great Britain and" in paragraph 1(c).
1996 c. 25	Criminal Procedure and Investigations Act 1996	Section 46.
1996 c. 25	Criminal Procedure and Investigations Act 1996	Section 65.
1998 c. 37	Crime and Disorder Act 1998	Section 35.
1998 c. 37	Crime and Disorder Act 1998	Section 36(3) and (6).
1998 c. 37	Crime and Disorder Act 1998	Section 97(5).
1998 c. 37	Crime and Disorder Act 1998	Sections 107 and 108.
1998 c. 37	Crime and Disorder Act 1998	Section 116.
2001 c. 24	Anti-terrorism, Crime and Security Act 2001	Sections 37 and 38.
2001 c. 24	Anti-terrorism, Crime and Security Act 2001	Sections 122 and 123.
2003 c. 17	Licensing Act 2003	In Schedule 6, paragraph 2.

==== Part 4 — East India Company ====
Part 4 — East India Company
Citation	Short title	Extent of repeal
36 Geo. 3. c. 119	East India Merchants and Purchase of Land in City, etc. Act 1796	The whole act.
36 Geo. 3. c. 127	East India Merchants and Land for Warehouses, etc. Act 1796	The whole act.
46 Geo. 3. c. cxxxiii	East India Company and the Nabobs of the Carnatic Act 1806	The whole act.
50 Geo. 3. c. cciii	East India Company and the Nabobs of the Carnatic Act 1810	The whole act.
52 Geo. 3. c. clxxxviii	East India Company and the Nabobs of the Carnatic Act 1812	The whole act.
57 Geo. 3. c. viii	East India Company and the Nabobs of the Carnatic Act 1817	The whole act.
59 Geo. 3. c. xxvi	East India Company and the Nabobs of the Carnatic Act 1819	The whole act.
3 Geo. 4. c. xviii	East India Company and the Nabobs of the Carnatic Act 1822	The whole act.
5 Geo. 4. c. cxvii	East India Company and the Rajah of Tanjore Act 1824	The whole act.
7 Geo. 4. c. xli	East India Company and Creditors of the Nabobs of the Carnatic Act 1826	The whole act.
11 Geo. 4 & 1 Will. 4. c. xxxiii	East India Company and Rajah of Tanjore Act 1830	The whole act.
2 & 3 Will. 4. c. cxii	East India Company Act 1832	The whole act.

==== Part 5 — London ====
Part 5 — London
Citation	Short title	Extent of repeal
Group 1 – Poor Relief
10 Geo. 3. c. 79	Holborn Poor Relief Act 1770	The whole act.
10 Geo. 3. c. 80	Holborn Poor Relief Act 1770 (No. 2)	The whole act.
14 Geo. 3. c. 75	Southwark Workhouse Act 1774	The whole act.
38 Geo. 3. c. xxxiv	St Sepulchre's Workhouse Act 1798	The whole act.
39 Geo. 3. c. iv	St Bride Fleet Street Poor Relief Act 1799	The whole act.
46 Geo. 3. c. xvi	St Sepulchre City of London Poor Relief Act 1806	The whole act.
59 Geo. 3. c. xv	Wapping Workhouse Act 1819	The whole act.
7 Geo. 4. c. cxiv	St Bride Fleet Street Poor Relief Act 1826	The whole act.
Group 2 – Westminster Court House
18 Geo. 3. c. 72	Westminster Improvement Act 1778	The whole act.
39 Geo. 3. c. lxxxii	Westminster Court House Act 1799	The whole act.
44 Geo. 3. c. 61	Sessions Houses, Westminster, etc. Act 1804	Section 3.
47 Geo. 3. Sess. 2. c. lxvii	Westminster Court House Act 1807	The whole act.
Group 3 – London Coal Duties
45 Geo. 3. c. ii	London Coal Trade Act 1805	The whole act.
5 Geo. 4. c. cxlvii	City of London Coal Trade Act 1824	The whole act.
3 & 4 Vict. c. cxxxi	Port of London Coal and Wines Import Duties Act 1840	The whole act.
6 & 7 Vict. c. ci	Port of London Coalwhippers Act 1843	The whole act.
14 & 15 Vict. c. cxlvi	Coal Duties (London and Westminster and adjacent Counties) Act 1851	The whole act.
20 & 21 Vict. c. lxxxix	Coal Duties (London, etc.) Drawback Act 1857	The whole act.
Group 4 – Court of Chancery
49 Geo. 3. c. lxix	Court of Chancery Act 1809	The whole act.
50 Geo. 3. c. clxiv	Court of Chancery Act 1810	The whole act.
56 Geo. 3. c. lxxxiv	Court of Chancery Act 1816	The whole act.
10 Geo. 4. c. cxvi	Six Clerks and Chancery Inrolment Offices Act 1829	The whole act.
5 & 6 Will. 4. c. cvi	Court of Chancery (Improvement of Offices) Act 1835	The whole act.
Group 5 – Markets
54 Geo. 3. c. cxv	Sheepskin Inspectors (King's Place Market, St Mary Newington) Act 1814	The whole act.
32 & 33 Vict. c. clvii	Belgrave Market Act 1869	The whole act.
34 & 35 Vict. c. liv	Leadenhall Market Act 1871	The whole act.
35 & 36 Vict. c. lxxxii	Newport Market Act 1872	The whole act.
36 & 37 Vict. c. clxix	Belgrave Market (Extension of Time) Act 1873	The whole act.
42 & 43 Vict. c. cii	Leadenhall Market Act 1879	Section 16.
Group 6 – General repeals
18 Geo. 3. c. 67	Middlesex Sessions House Act 1778	The whole act.
39 Geo. 3. c. lviii	London, Westminster and Southwark Porterage Rates Act 1799	The whole act.
50 Geo. 3. c. xxviii	Westminster Sunday Tolls Act 1810	The whole act.
53 Geo. 3. c. cxvi	King's Bench, Marshalsea and Fleet Prisons (Relief of Poor Prisoners) Act 1813	The whole act.
59 Geo. 3. c. cxxvii	London Bread Trade Act 1819	The whole act.
60 Geo. 3 & 1 Geo. 4. c. i	Bread Industry (London) Act 1819	The whole act.
1 Geo. 4. c. iv	Bread Trade Act 1820	The whole act.
7 Geo. 4. c. xlii	Westminster Bridewell Act 1826	The whole act.
35 & 36 Vict. c. c	Metage on Grain (Port of London) Act 1872	The whole act.
47 & 48 Vict. c. clxxvi	City of London Free Ferry Act 1884	The whole act.
54 & 55 Vict. c. cxlii	Westminster Improvement Commissioners Winding-up Act 1891	The whole act.
4 Edw. 7. c. xciii	City of London (Central Criminal Court House) Act 1904	The whole act.
14 & 15 Geo. 6. c. x	City of London (Central Criminal Court) Act 1951	The whole act.
1 & 2 Eliz. 2. c. vi	City of London (Central Criminal Court) Act 1953	The whole act.
1985 c. 10	London Regional Transport (Amendment) Act 1985	The whole act.
1996 c. 21	London Regional Transport Act 1996	The whole act.

==== Part 6 — Police ====
Part 6 — Police
Citation	Short title	Extent of repeal
2 & 3 Vict. c. xciv	City of London Police Act 1839	Section 40.
31 & 32 Vict. c. lix	Oxford Police Act 1868	The whole act.
49 & 50 Vict. c. v	West Riding Police Superannuation Act 1886	The whole act.
50 & 51 Vict. c. xxxi	Metropolitan Police Provisional Order Confirmation Act 1887	The whole act.
51 & 52 Vict. c. ix	Lincolnshire Police Superannuation Act 1888	The whole act.
51 & 52 Vict. c. lvi	Metropolitan Police Provisional Order Confirmation Act 1888	The whole act.
52 & 53 Vict. c. xlv	Metropolitan Police Provisional Order Confirmation Act 1889	The whole act.
52 & 53 Vict. c. cxxvii	City of London Police Superannuation Act 1889	The whole act.
53 & 54 Vict. c. lxxvii	Metropolitan Police Provisional Order Confirmation Act 1890	The whole act.
54 & 55 Vict. c. xxiv	Metropolitan Police Provisional Order Confirmation Act 1891	The whole act.
55 & 56 Vict. c. ccviii	Metropolitan Police Provisional Order Confirmation Act 1892	The whole act.
56 & 57 Vict. c. cxlvi	Metropolitan Police Provisional Order Confirmation Act 1893	The whole act.
57 & 58 Vict. c. xlii	Metropolitan Police Provisional Order Confirmation Act 1894	The whole act.
58 & 59 Vict. c. lxv	Metropolitan Police Provisional Order Confirmation Act 1895	The whole act.
59 & 60 Vict. c. lxxxi	Metropolitan Police Provisional Order Confirmation Act 1896	The whole act.
60 & 61 Vict. c. iii	Metropolitan Police Provisional Order Confirmation Act 1897	The whole act.
61 & 62 Vict. c. lxxvi	Metropolitan Police Provisional Order Confirmation Act 1898	The whole act.
62 & 63 Vict. c. xxvii	Metropolitan Police Provisional Order Confirmation Act 1899	The whole act.
63 & 64 Vict. c. xxi	Metropolitan Police Provisional Order Confirmation Act 1900	The whole act.
1 Edw. 7. c. clvi	Metropolitan Police Provisional Order Confirmation Act 1901	The whole act.
2 Edw. 7. c. lxv	Metropolitan Police Provisional Order Confirmation Act 1902	The whole act.
3 Edw. 7. c. cxliv	Metropolitan Police Provisional Order Confirmation Act 1903	The whole act.
4 Edw. 7. c. lxi	Metropolitan Police Provisional Order Confirmation Act 1904	The whole act.
5 Edw. 7. c. lxiv	Metropolitan Police Provisional Order Confirmation Act 1905	The whole act.
6 Edw. 7. c. xxiii	Metropolitan Police Provisional Order Confirmation Act 1906	The whole act.
7 Edw. 7. c. xlviii	Metropolitan Police Provisional Order Confirmation Act 1907	The whole act.
8 Edw. 7. c. xxxi	Metropolitan Police Provisional Order Confirmation Act 1908	The whole act.
10 Edw. 7 & 1 Geo. 5. c. lxvii	Metropolitan Police Provisional Order Confirmation Act 1910	The whole act.
1 & 2 Geo. 5. c. cxxxvii	Metropolitan Police Provisional Order Confirmation Act 1911	The whole act.
2 & 3 Geo. 5. c. xxix	Metropolitan Police Provisional Order Confirmation Act 1912	The whole act.
10 & 11 Geo. 5. c. xliv	Metropolitan Police Provisional Order Confirmation Act 1920	The whole act.
2 & 3 Geo. 6. c. 103	Police and Firemen (War Service) Act 1939	The whole act.
7 & 8 Geo. 6. c. 22	Police and Firemen (War Service) Act 1944	The whole act.
1984 c. 60	Police and Criminal Evidence Act 1984	Section 108.
1984 c. 60	Police and Criminal Evidence Act 1984	Section 110.
1984 c. 60	Police and Criminal Evidence Act 1984	In section 120(2), the entries relating to section 108(4) and (5), and section 110.
1984 c. 60	Police and Criminal Evidence Act 1984	In section 120(4), the entries relating to section 83(2), section 108(1) and (6), and section 109.
1984 c. 60	Police and Criminal Evidence Act 1984	In section 120(5), the entry relating to section 83(2).
1994 c. 29	Police and Magistrates' Courts Act 1994	Section 33.
1994 c. 29	Police and Magistrates' Courts Act 1994	Section 41.
1997 c. 45	Police (Insurance of Voluntary Assistants) Act 1997	The whole act.

==== Part 7 — Rating ====
Part 7 — Rating
Citation	Short title	Extent of repeal
6 Ann. c. 46 (Note: This is the citation in The Statutes of the Realm.)	Plymouth Workhouse Act 1707	The whole act.
32 Geo. 2. c. 59	Plymouth Poor Relief Act 1758	The whole act.
26 Geo. 3. c. 19	Plymouth Poor Relief Act 1786	The whole act.
31 Geo. 3. c. 87	Sunderland Poor Relief Act 1791	The whole act.
49 Geo. 3. c. xxii	Sunderland Poor Rates Act 1809	The whole act.
50 Geo. 3. c. i	Cumberland County Rate Act 1810	The whole act.
53 Geo. 3. c. lxxiii	Plymouth Workhouse Act 1813	The whole act.
54 Geo. 3. c. ciii	Buckinghamshire County Rate Act 1814	The whole act.
3 Geo. 4. c. cvii	Middlesex County Rates Act 1822	The whole act.
6 Geo. 4. c. lxxvi	Croydon Rates Act 1825	The whole act.
9 Geo. 4. c. i	Merton Rates Act 1828	The whole act.
9 Geo. 4. c. ii	St Mary Wimbledon Rates Act 1828	The whole act.
4 & 5 Will. 4. c. v	Sculcoates Rates Act 1834	The whole act.
4 & 5 Will. 4. c. vi	Liverpool Rates Act 1834	The whole act.
5 & 6 Will. 4. c. v	Barking Rates Act 1835	The whole act.
4 & 5 Vict. c. lxxii	Kidderminster Poor Rates Act 1841	The whole act.
8 & 9 Vict. c. lxxiv	Hemel Hempsted Rates Act 1845	The whole act.
8 & 9 Vict. c. cciv	Bristol Rates Act 1845	The whole act.
9 & 10 Vict. c. iii	Aylesbury and Walton Rates Act 1846	The whole act.
9 & 10 Vict. c. xlii	Carshalton Rates Act 1846	The whole act.
10 & 11 Vict. c. xlvi	Ewell Rates Act 1847	The whole act.
11 & 12 Vict. c. i	Kettering Rates Act 1848	The whole act.
13 & 14 Vict. c. iv	West Bromwich Rates Act 1850	The whole act.
13 & 14 Vict. c. xlvi	Stourbridge Union Rates Act 1850	The whole act.
23 & 24 Vict. c. lxxxvi	Bucks County Rate Amendment Act 1860	The whole act.
23 & 24 Vict. c. cxxxii	Leeds Overseers Act 1860	The whole act.
6 & 7 Geo. 5. c. lxiii	Plymouth Workhouse Charities Scheme Confirmation Act 1916	The whole act.
4 & 5 Eliz. 2. c. 9	Rating and Valuation (Miscellaneous Provisions) Act 1955	The whole act.
1984 c. 33	Rates Act 1984	The whole act.

==== Part 8 — Tax and Duties ====
Part 8 — Tax and Duties
Citation	Short title	Extent of repeal
15 & 16 Vict. c. cxxxvi	Hull Dues Act 1852	The whole act.
40 & 41 Vict. c. 13	Customs, Inland Revenue, and Savings Banks Act 1877	The whole act (except as it extends to Scotland).
42 & 43 Vict. c. 21	Customs and Inland Revenue Act 1879	The whole act.
54 & 55 Vict. c. 39	Stamp Act 1891	Section 25.
54 & 55 Vict. c. 39	Stamp Act 1891	Section 49.
54 & 55 Vict. c. 39	Stamp Act 1891	Section 111.
54 & 55 Vict. c. 39	Stamp Act 1891	Section 120.
54 & 55 Vict. c. 39	Stamp Act 1891	In section 122(1), the words "The expression “steward”" to the end.
2 Edw. 7. c. 7	Finance Act 1902	The whole act.
1 & 2 Geo. 5. c. 48	Finance Act 1911	The whole act.
13 & 14 Geo. 5. c. 14	Finance Act 1923	The whole act.
22 & 23 Geo. 5. c. 25	Finance Act 1932	The whole act.
2 & 3 Geo. 6. c. 109	Finance (No. 2) Act 1939	The whole act.
7 & 8 Geo. 6. c. 23	Finance Act 1944	Part 5.
7 & 8 Geo. 6. c. 23	Finance Act 1944	Section 49(5).
8 & 9 Geo. 6. c. 24	Finance Act 1945	The whole act.
10 & 11 Geo. 6. c. 35	Finance Act 1947	Sections 63 and 64.
10 & 11 Geo. 6. c. 35	Finance Act 1947	Section 74(8).
11 & 12 Geo. 6. c. 49	Finance Act 1948	Part 5.
11 & 12 Geo. 6. c. 49	Finance Act 1948	Part 7.
11 & 12 Geo. 6. c. 49	Finance Act 1948	Schedule 10.
12, 13 & 14 Geo. 6. c. 47	Finance Act 1949	Section 49.
12, 13 & 14 Geo. 6. c. 47	Finance Act 1949	In section 51(1), the words "excess profits tax or the special contribution,".
12, 13 & 14 Geo. 6. c. 47	Finance Act 1949	Section 51(2).
15 & 16 Geo. 6 & 1 Eliz. 2. c. 33	Finance Act 1952	Part 5.
15 & 16 Geo. 6 & 1 Eliz. 2. c. 33	Finance Act 1952	Section 69.
15 & 16 Geo. 6 & 1 Eliz. 2. c. 33	Finance Act 1952	Section 76(2) and (5).
15 & 16 Geo. 6 & 1 Eliz. 2. c. 33	Finance Act 1952	Schedules 8 to 12.
1 & 2 Eliz. 2. c. 34	Finance Act 1953	Section 32.
1 & 2 Eliz. 2. c. 34	Finance Act 1953	Section 35(4).
6 & 7 Eliz. 2. c. 56	Finance Act 1958	Section 35.
6 & 7 Eliz. 2. c. 56	Finance Act 1958	Section 40(2)(b), (c) and (d).
9 & 10 Eliz. 2. c. 36	Finance Act 1961	Section 32.
10 & 11 Eliz. 2. c. 44	Finance Act 1962	Section 34(5).
1963 c. 25	Finance Act 1963	Section 65(3).
1964 c. 49	Finance Act 1964	The whole act.
1966 c. 18	Finance Act 1966	Section 27.
1966 c. 18	Finance Act 1966	Schedule 6.
1968 c. 44	Finance Act 1968	Part 4.
1968 c. 44	Finance Act 1968	Section 61(7).
1968 c. 44	Finance Act 1968	Schedules 15 and 16.
1979 c. 2	Customs and Excise Management Act 1979	In Schedule 4, in paragraph 12, the entry in Part 1 of the Table relating to the Customs and Inland Revenue Act 1879.
1980 c. 48	Finance Act 1980	Section 3.
1980 c. 48	Finance Act 1980	Section 7.
1980 c. 48	Finance Act 1980	Section 61.
1980 c. 48	Finance Act 1980	Section 103.
1982 c. 39	Finance Act 1982	Section 1(3).
1982 c. 39	Finance Act 1982	Section 3.
1982 c. 39	Finance Act 1982	Section 137.
1982 c. 39	Finance Act 1982	Section 150.
1982 c. 39	Finance Act 1982	Schedule 1.
1983 c. 28	Finance Act 1983	Section 1(3)
1983 c. 28	Finance Act 1983	Section 3.
1983 c. 28	Finance Act 1983	Schedule 1.

==== Part 9 — Town and Country Planning ====
Part 9 — Town and Country Planning
Citation	Short title	Extent of repeal
1967 c. 69	Civic Amenities Act 1967	Section 15.
1967 c. 69	Civic Amenities Act 1967	Section 30(1).
1967 c. 69	Civic Amenities Act 1967	Section 32(2).
1974 c. 32	Town and Country Amenities Act 1974	The whole act.
1980 c. 65	Local Government, Planning and Land Act 1980	Section 25(2).
1980 c. 65	Local Government, Planning and Land Act 1980	Section 86.
1980 c. 65	Local Government, Planning and Land Act 1980	Sections 173 to 175.
1980 c. 65	Local Government, Planning and Land Act 1980	Section 178.
1980 c. 65	Local Government, Planning and Land Act 1980	Section 183(3).
1980 c. 65	Local Government, Planning and Land Act 1980	In Schedule 23, paragraphs 4, 6, 7, 13, 15 and 18.
1986 c. 63	Housing and Planning Act 1986	Section 2(2).
1986 c. 63	Housing and Planning Act 1986	Section 4(6).
1986 c. 63	Housing and Planning Act 1986	Section 11.
1986 c. 63	Housing and Planning Act 1986	Section 47.
1986 c. 63	Housing and Planning Act 1986	Section 52.
1986 c. 63	Housing and Planning Act 1986	Section 53(1).
1986 c. 63	Housing and Planning Act 1986	Section 54.
1986 c. 63	Housing and Planning Act 1986	In section 58(1), the words "Schedule 10,".
1986 c. 63	Housing and Planning Act 1986	In section 58(2), the words "Part II of Schedule 11".
1986 c. 63	Housing and Planning Act 1986	In Schedule 11, Part 2.
1987 c. 57	Urban Development Corporations (Financial Limits) Act 1987	The whole act.
1990 c. 10	Planning (Hazardous Substances) Act 1990	Section 26.
1990 c. 10	Planning (Hazardous Substances) Act 1990	Section 41(2).
1990 c. 10	Planning (Hazardous Substances) Act 1990	In section 41(3), the words "Except so far as subsection (2) applies,".
1995 c. 49	Town and Country Planning (Costs of Inquiries etc.) Act 1995	The whole act.

==== Part 10 — Turnpikes ====
Part 10 — Turnpikes
Citation	Short title	Extent of repeal
Group 1 – Essex
7 & 8 Will. 3. c. 9	London to Harwich Roads Act 1695	The whole act.
1 Ann. Stat. 2. c. 10	Essex Roads Act 1702	The whole act.
6 Ann. c. 47	London to Harwich Roads Act 1707	The whole act.
12 Geo. 1. c. 23	Essex Roads Act 1725	The whole act.
20 Geo. 2. c. 7	Essex Roads Act 1746	The whole act.
5 Geo. 3. c. 60	Essex, Suffolk and Hertford Roads Act 1765	The whole act.
33 Geo. 3. c. 149	Essex Roads Act 1793	The whole act.
34 Geo. 3. c. 137	Chelmsford Roads Act 1794	The whole act.
39 Geo. 3. c. xxiii	Jeremy's Ferry Bridge and Roads (Essex and Middlesex) Act 1799	The whole act.
48 Geo. 3. c. xcii	Tilbury Fort Road Act 1808	The whole act.
55 Geo. 3. c. xc	Road from Shenfield to Harwich Act 1815	The whole act.
1 & 2 Geo. 4. c. xxxiii	Tilbury Fort Road Act 1821	The whole act.
4 Geo. 4. c. cvi	Middlesex and Essex Turnpike Roads Act 1823	The whole act.
10 Geo. 4. c. xxi	Road from Harlow Bush Common to Stump Cross Act 1829	The whole act.
6 & 7 Will. 4. c. xlix	Road from Harlow Bush Common Act 1836	The whole act.
Group 2 – Suffolk
33 Geo. 3. c. 128	Ipswich and Yaxley Roads Act 1793	The whole act.
42 Geo. 3. c. viii	Woodbridge and Eye Road Act 1802	The whole act.
51 Geo. 3. c. cviii	Suffolk Roads Act 1811	The whole act.
53 Geo. 3. c. xxiv	Aldeburgh Roads Act 1813	The whole act.
54 Geo. 3. c. xvi	Woodbridge and Eye Road Act 1814	The whole act.
7 Geo. 4. c. cxxxi	Sudbury and Bury St Edmunds Road Act 1826	The whole act.
9 Geo. 4. c. xlv	Road from Ipswich to Southtown and to Bungay Act 1828	The whole act.
9 Geo. 4. c. lxxv	Scole Bridge and Bury St Edmunds Road Act 1828	The whole act.
10 Geo. 4. c. liii	Newmarket Heath Road Act 1829	The whole act.
11 Geo. 4 & 1 Will. 4. c. xxxviii	Haverhill to Redcross Road (Suffolk, Cambridgeshire) Act 1830	The whole act.
1 & 2 Will. 4. c. xix	Barton and Brandon Bridge Road (Suffolk) Act 1831	The whole act.
2 & 3 Will. 4. c. v	Road from Ipswich to Stratford St Mary Act 1832	The whole act.
3 & 4 Will. 4. c. x	Ipswich and Debenham, and Hemingston and Otley Bottom Roads Act 1833	The whole act.
3 & 4 Will. 4. c. xcviii	Roads from Bury St Edmunds to Newmarket and to Brandon Act 1833	The whole act.
4 & 5 Will. 4. c. xxix	Yarmouth Bridge and Gorleston Road (Suffolk) Act 1834	The whole act.
14 & 15 Vict. c. xviii	Mildenhall and Lakenheath Roads Act 1851	The whole act.
Group 3 – Norfolk
10 Geo. 3. c. 54	Norfolk Roads Act 1770	The whole act.
30 Geo. 3. c. 85	Norwich to Bixley Roads Act 1790	The whole act.
32 Geo. 3. c. 148	Norfolk Roads Act 1792	The whole act.
56 Geo. 3. c. lxviii	Norwich and Thetford Road Act 1816	The whole act.
4 Geo. 4. c. lv	Wisbech and King's Lynn Roads Act 1823	The whole act.
7 Geo. 4. c. xxvii	Norwich and Scole Bridge Road Act 1826	The whole act.
9 Geo. 4. c. li	Thetford and Newmarket Road Act 1828	The whole act.
9 Geo. 4. c. ci	Wells next the Sea and Fakenham Turnpike Road Act 1828	The whole act.
11 Geo. 4 & 1 Will. 4. c. xxxix	Great Yarmouth and Acle Turnpike Road Act 1830	The whole act.
1 Will. 4. c. xxxii	Norwich and North Walsham Road Act 1831	The whole act.
1 Will. 4. c. lxv	Road from Norwich to the Caister Causeway Act 1831	The whole act.
1 & 2 Will. 4. c. xiv	Norwich and Cromer Road Act 1831	The whole act.
1 & 2 Will. 4. c. xx	King's Lynn Roads Act 1831	The whole act.
2 & 3 Will. 4. c. xxi	Downham Market, Barton and Devil's Ditch Road Act 1832	The whole act.
2 & 3 Will. 4. c. liii	Little Yarmouth and Blythburgh, and Brampton and Halesworth Roads Act 1832	The whole act.
2 & 3 Will. 4. c. lxiii	Norwich and Fakenham Road Act 1832	The whole act.
3 & 4 Will. 4. c. xv	Norwich and Watton Road Act 1833	The whole act.
3 & 4 Will. 4. c. xxxix	Norwich and New Buckenham Road Act 1833	The whole act.
5 & 6 Will. 4. c. xl	Norwich and Swaffham Road Act 1835	The whole act.

==== Part 11 — Miscelleneaous ====
Part 11 — Miscellaneous
Citation	Short title	Extent of repeal
1968 c. 73	Transport Act 1968	Section 142.
1973 c. 24	Employment of Children Act 1973	The whole act.
1973 c. 66	Channel Tunnel (Initial Finance) Act 1973	The whole act.
1985 c. 67	Transport Act 1985	Section 3(1).
1989 c. 41	Children Act 1989	In Schedule 13, paragraph 32.
1990 c. 11	Planning (Consequential Provisions) Act 1990	In Schedule 2, paragraph 22(5).
1995 c. 36	Children (Scotland) Act 1995	In Schedule 4, paragraph 19.
1996 c. 56	Education Act 1996	Section 559(6).

== See also ==
- Statute Law (Repeals) Act
- Statute Law Revision Act
