= Public Authorities Protection Act 1893 =

Act of the Parliament of the United Kingdom

Public Authorities Protection Act 1893 (Note: Section 5.)
- Act of Parliament
- Parliament of the United Kingdom
- Long title: An Act to generalize and amend certain statutory provisions for the protection of persons acting in the execution of statutory and other public duties.
- Citation: 56 & 57 Vict. c. 61
- Territorial extent: United Kingdom

Dates
- Royal assent: 5 December 1893
- Commencement: 1 January 1894 (Note: Section 4.)
- Repealed: England and Wales and Scotland: 4 June 1954; Northern Ireland: 23 December 1954
Other legislation
Amends	See § Repealed enactments
Repeals/revokes	See § Repealed enactments
Repealed by	England and Wales and Scotland: Law Reform (Limitation of Actions, etc.) Act 1954; Northern Ireland: Law Reform (Miscellaneous Provisions) Act (Northern Ireland) 1954

Status: Repealed

Text of statute as originally enacted

The Public Authorities Protection Act 1893 (56 & 57 Vict. c. 61) was an act of the Parliament of the United Kingdom that generalized and consolidated statutory provisions protecting persons acting in the execution of statutory or other public duties in the United Kingdom.

The act provided that any action, prosecution or other proceeding brought against a person for an act done in pursuance, or execution, or intended execution, of an Act of Parliament or of any public duty or authority had to be commenced within six months of the act, neglect or default complained of, and it entitled a successful defendant to costs taxed as between solicitor and client. (Note: Sections 1(a) and 1(b).) Section 2 of the act repealed a large number of earlier, similar provisions scattered across the statute book, replacing them with this single, general limitation period.

== Provisions ==
=== Repealed enactments ===
Section 2 of the act repealed 108 enactments, listed in the schedule to the act.

Citation	Short title	Description	Extent of repeal
43 Eliz. 1. c. 2	Poor Relief Act 1601	The Poor Relief Act, 1601.	Section eighteen.
3 Jas. 1. c. 10	Conveyance of Offenders to Gaol Act 1605	An Act for the rating and levying of the charges for conveying malefactors and offenders to the gaol.	Section three.
7 Jas. 1. c. 5	Public Officers Protection Act 1609	An Act for ease in pleading against troublesome and contentious suits prosecuted against Justices of the Peace, Mayors, Constables, and certain other His Majesty's officers, for the lawful execution of their office.	The whole act.
21 Jas. 1. c. 12	Public Officers Protection Act 1623	An Act for ease in pleading against troublesome and contentious suits.	The whole act.
3 Chas. 1. c. 2	Sunday Observance Act 1627	The Sunday Observance Act, 1627.	From "that such bill plaint or information" to "Provided further."
31 Chas. 2. c. 2	Habeas Corpus Act 1679	The Habeas Corpus Act, 1679.	Section nineteen.
8 & 9 Will. 3. c. 27	Escape of Debtors, etc. Act 1696	The Escape of Debtors, etc. Act, 1696.	Section seventeen.
1 Anne c. 12 (Note: This is the citation in The Statutes of the Realm.)	Bridges Act 1702	The Bridges Act, 1702.	Section seven.
1 Anne, Stat. 2. c. 6	Escape of Debtors from Prison Act 1702	An Act for the better preventing escapes out of the Queen's Bench and Fleet Prisons.	Section five.
6 Geo. 2. c. 35	Lotteries Act 1732	An Act for enforcing the laws against foreign lotteries.	Section thirty-two.
8 Geo. 2. c. 13	Engraving Copyright Act 1734	The Engraving Copyright Act, 1734.	Section three.
12 Geo. 2. c. 26	Plate (Offences) Act 1738	An Act for the better preventing frauds and abuses in gold and silver wares.	Section twenty-three.
12 Geo. 2. c. 28	Gaming Act 1738	The Gaming Act, 1738.	Section twelve.
12 Geo. 2. c. 29	County Rates Act 1738	An Act for the more easy assessing, collecting, and levying of county rates.	Section twenty-four.
15 Geo. 2. c. 20	Gold and Silver Thread Act 1741	An Act to prevent the counterfeiting of gold and silver lace, and for settling and adjusting the proportions of fine silver and silk, and for the better making of gold and silver thread.	Section ten.
17 Geo. 2. c. 38	Poor Relief Act 1743	The Poor Relief Act, 1743.	Sections nine and ten.
19 Geo. 2. c. 21	Profane Oaths Act 1745	The Profane Oaths Act, 1745.	Section eleven.
29 Geo. 2. c. 36	Inclosure Act 1756	An Act for enclosing, by the mutual consent of the lord and tenants, part of any common for the purpose of planting and preserving trees fit for timber or underwood, and for more effectually preventing the unlawful destruction of trees.	Section ten.
31 Geo. 2. c. 22	Pension Duties Act 1757	An Act for granting to His Majesty several rates and duties upon offices and pensions.	Section seventy-nine.
7 Geo. 3. c. 38	Engraving Copyright Act 1766	The Engraving Copyright Act, 1766.	Section eight.
10 Geo. 3. c. 47	East India Company Act 1770	The East India Company Act, 1770.	Sections five and seven.
13 Geo. 3. c. 32	Lying-in Hospitals Act 1773	An Act the title whereof begins with the words "An Act for the better regulation of Lying-in Hospitals" and ends with the words "and Places".	Sections seventeen and eighteen.
15 Geo. 3. c. 53	Copyright Act 1775	The Copyright Act, 1775.	Section seven.
17 Geo. 3. c. 11	Worsted Act 1776	The Worsted Act, 1776.	Section twenty-four.
17 Geo. 3. c. 56	Frauds by Workmen Act 1777	An Act the title whereof begins with the words "An Act for amending" and ends with the words "by Journeymen Dyers".	Section twenty-five.
23 Geo. 3. c. 15	Dyeing Trade (Frauds) Act 1783	An Act for rendering more effectual the provisions contained in an Act of the thirteenth year of King George the First, for preventing frauds and abuses in the dyeing trade.	Section fifteen.
26 Geo. 3. c. 71	Knackers Act 1786	The Knackers Act, 1786.	Section eighteen.
28 Geo. 3. c. 7	Gold and Silver Thread Act 1788	An Act the title whereof begins with the words "An Act to amend" and ends with the words "Silver thread".	Section six.
36 Geo. 3. c. 52	Legacy Duty Act 1796	The Legacy Duty Act, 1796.	Section forty-seven.
36 Geo. 3. c. 60	Metal Button Act 1796	An Act to regulate the making and vending of metal buttons, and to prevent the purchasers thereof from being deceived in the real quality of such buttons.	Section twenty-one.
36 Geo. 3. c. 88	Hay and Straw Act 1796	An Act the title whereof begins with the words "An Act to regulate the buying and selling of Hay and Straw" and ends with the words "Limits therein mentioned".	Section thirty-one.
38 Geo. 3. c. 5	Land Tax Act 1797	The Land Tax Act, 1797.	Section thirty-nine.
39 Geo. 3. c. 79	Unlawful Societies Act 1799	The Unlawful Societies Act, 1799.	Section thirty-seven.
41 Geo. 3. c. 79	Public Notaries Act 1801	The Public Notaries Act, 1801.	Section seventeen.
42 Geo. 3. c. 85	Criminal Jurisdiction Act 1802	The Criminal Jurisdiction Act, 1802.	Section six, to "Provided always that."
42 Geo. 3. c. 119	Gaming Act 1802	The Gaming Act, 1802.	Section eight.
45 Geo. 3. c. 28	Legacy Duty Act 1805	An Act for granting to His Majesty additional stamp duties in Great Britain on certain legacies.	Section twelve.
50 Geo. 3. c. 108	Sea Fisheries (Scotland) Act 1810	An Act to amend and enlarge the powers of an Act passed in the second year of His present Majesty, for the encouragement of the fisheries of this kingdom, and the protection of the persons employed therein.	Section fifteen.
52 Geo. 3. c. 38	Local Militia (England) Act 1812	The Local Militia (England) Act, 1812.	Section two hundred and six.
52 Geo. 3. c. 155	Places of Religious Worship Act 1812	The Places of Religious Worship Act, 1812.	Section eighteen.
53 Geo. 3. c. 127	Ecclesiastical Courts Act 1813	The Ecclesiastical Courts Act, 1813.	Section twelve.
54 Geo. 3. c. 159	Harbours Act 1814	The Harbours Act, 1814.	Section twenty-seven.
55 Geo. 3. c. 194	Apothecaries Act 1815	The Apothecaries Act, 1815.	Section thirty.
57 Geo. 3. c. 19	Seditious Meetings Act 1817	The Seditious Meetings Act, 1817.	Sections thirty-two and thirty-three.
58 Geo. 3. c. 45	Church Building Act 1818	The Church Building Act, 1818.	Section eighty-three.
60 Geo. 3 & 1 Geo. 4. c. 1	Unlawful Drilling Act 1819	The Unlawful Drilling Act, 1819.	Sections five and six.
60 Geo. 3 & 1 Geo. 4. c. 8	Criminal Libel Act 1819	The Criminal Libel Act, 1819.	Sections eight and nine.
4 Geo. 4. c. 60	Lotteries Act 1823	An Act for granting to His Majesty a sum of money to be raised by lotteries.	Section sixty-eight.
4 Geo. 4. c. 80	Lascars Act 1823	An Act to consolidate and amend the several laws now in force with respect to trade from and to places within the limits of the charter of the East India Company, and to make further provision with respect to such trade.	Section thirty-three.
5 Geo. 4. c. 83	Vagrancy Act 1824	The Vagrancy Act, 1824.	Section nineteen.
5 Geo. 4. c. 84	Transportation Act 1824	The Transportation Act, 1824.	Sections twenty-seven and twenty-eight.
5 Geo. 4. c. 96	Masters and Workmen Arbitration Act 1824	The Masters and Workmen Arbitration Act, 1824.	Sections thirty-three and thirty-four.
6 Geo. 4. c. 50	Juries Act 1825	The Juries Act, 1825.	Sections fifty-eight and fifty-nine.
6 Geo. 4. c. 78	Quarantine Act 1825	The Quarantine Act, 1825.	Section thirty-seven.
7 Geo. 4. c. 63	County Buildings Act 1826	An Act to provide for repairing, improving, and rebuilding shire halls, county halls, and other buildings for holding the assizes and grand sessions, and also judges' lodgings, throughout England and Wales.	Section twenty-one.
9 Geo. 4. c. 61	Alehouse Act 1828	The Alehouse Act, 1828.	Section thirty.
9 Geo. 4. c. 82	Lighting of Towns (Ireland) Act 1828	The Lighting of Towns (Ireland) Act, 1828.	Section seventy-four.
10 Geo. 4. c. 24	Government Annuities Act 1829	The Government Annuities Act, 1829.	Section fifty-one.
1 & 2 Will. 4. c. 22	London Hackney Carriage Act 1831	The London Hackney Carriage Act, 1831.	Section seventy-three.
1 & 2 Will. 4. c. 32	Game Act 1831	The Game Act, 1831.	Section forty-seven.
1 & 2 Will. 4. c. 41	Special Constables Act 1831	The Special Constables Act, 1831.	Section nineteen.
2 & 3 Will. 4. c. 75	Anatomy Act 1832	The Anatomy Act, 1832.	Section seventeen.
2 & 3 Will. 4. c. 93	Ecclesiastical Courts (Contempt) Act 1832	An Act for enforcing the process upon contempts in the courts ecclesiastical of England and Ireland.	Section five.
2 & 3 Will. 4. c. 120	Stage Carriages Act 1832	The Stage Carriages Act, 1832.	Section one hundred and sixteen.
3 & 4 Will. 4. c. 90	Lighting and Watching Act 1833	The Lighting and Watching Act, 1833.	Section sixty-nine.
3 & 4 Will. 4. c. 93	China Trade Act 1833	An Act to regulate the trade to China and India.	Section nine.
4 & 5 Will. 4. c. 76	Poor Law Amendment Act 1834	The Poor Law Amendment Act, 1834.	Section one hundred and four.
5 & 6 Will. 4. c. 50	Highway Act 1835	The Highway Act, 1835.	Section one hundred and nine.
6 & 7 Will. 4. c. 37	Bread Act 1836	The Bread Act, 1836.	Section thirty.
6 & 7 Will. 4. c. 71	Tithe Act 1836	The Tithe Act, 1836.	Section ninety-four.
7 Will. 4 & 1 Vict. c. 36	Post Office (Offences) Act 1837	The Post Office (Offences) Act, 1837.	Section forty-six.
2 & 3 Vict. c. 71	Metropolitan Police Courts Act 1839	The Metropolitan Police Courts Act, 1839.	Section fifty-three.
3 & 4 Vict. c. 50	Canals (Offences) Act 1840	An Act to provide for keeping the peace on canals and navigable rivers.	Section eighteen.
4 & 5 Vict. c. 30	Ordnance Survey Act 1841	The Ordnance Survey Act, 1841.	Section fourteen.
4 & 5 Vict. c. 35	Copyhold Act 1841	The Copyhold Act, 1841.	Section ninety-five.
5 & 6 Vict. c. 45	Copyright Act 1842	The Copyright Act, 1842.	Section twenty-six.
5 & 6 Vict. c. 97	Limitations of Actions and Costs Act 1842	An Act to amend the law relating to double costs, notices of action, limitations of actions, and pleas of the general issue under general Acts of Parliament.	Section two.
6 & 7 Vict. c. 40	Hosiery Act 1843	The Hosiery Act, 1843.	Section thirty-one, to "on behalf of the defendant or avowant."
6 & 7 Vict. c. 86	London Hackney Carriages Act 1843	The London Hackney Carriages Act, 1843.	Section forty-seven.
7 & 8 Vict. c. 19	Inferior Courts Act 1844	The Inferior Courts Act, 1844.	Section eight.
7 & 8 Vict. c. 22	Gold and Silver Wares Act 1844	The Gold and Silver Wares Act, 1844.	Section thirteen.
8 & 9 Vict. c. 63	Geological Survey Act 1845	The Geological Survey Act, 1845.	Section five.
8 & 9 Vict. c. 118	Inclosure Act 1845	The Inclosure Act, 1845.	Section one hundred and sixty-five.
10 & 11 Vict. c. 16	Commissioners' Clauses Act 1847	The Commissioners' Clauses Act, 1847.	Section one hundred and three.
11 & 12 Vict. c. 44	Justices Protection Act 1848	The Justices Protection Act, 1848.	Section ten, to "Provided always that." Sections eleven, twelve, and fourteen.
11 & 12 Vict. c. 83	Assessionable Manors Award Act 1848	The Assessionable Manors Award Act, 1848.	Section twelve.
12 & 13 Vict. c. 16	Justices Protection (Ireland) Act 1849	The Justices Protection (Ireland) Act, 1849.	Sections eight, nine, and twelve. In section thirteen, the words "for any costs of suit whatsoever." Section fourteen.
12 & 13 Vict. c. 92	Cruelty to Animals Act 1849	The Cruelty to Animals Act, 1849.	Section twenty-seven.
17 & 18 Vict. c. 103	Towns Improvement (Ireland) Act 1854	The Towns Improvement (Ireland) Act, 1854.	Section ninety-five.
18 & 19 Vict. c. 119	Passengers Act 1855	The Passengers Act, 1855.	Section ninety-three.
18 & 19 Vict. c. 122	Metropolitan Building Act 1855	The Metropolitan Building Act, 1855.	Section one hundred and eight.
22 & 23 Vict. c. 66	Sale of Gas Act 1859	The Sale of Gas Act, 1859.	Sections twenty-seven and twenty-eight.
24 & 25 Vict. c. 96	Larceny Act 1861	The Larceny Act, 1861.	Section one hundred and thirteen.
24 & 25 Vict. c. 97	Malicious Damage Act 1861	The Malicious Damage Act, 1861.	Section seventy-one.
24 & 25 Vict. c. 99	Coinage Offences Act 1861	The Coinage Offences Act, 1861.	Section thirty-three.
25 & 26 Vict. c. 102	Metropolis Management Amendment Act 1862	The Metropolis Management Amendment Act, 1862.	Section one hundred and six.
27 & 28 Vict. c. 25	Naval Prize Act 1864	The Naval Prize Act, 1864.	Section fifty-one.
28 & 29 Vict. c. 125	Dockyard Ports Regulation Act 1865	The Dockyard Ports Regulation Act, 1865.	Section twenty-four.
28 & 29 Vict. c. 126	Prison Act 1865	The Prison Act, 1865.	Sections forty-nine and fifty.
34 & 35 Vict. c. 43	Ecclesiastical Dilapidations Act 1871	The Ecclesiastical Dilapidations Act, 1871.	Section sixty-eight.
38 & 39 Vict. c. 55	Public Health Act 1875	The Public Health Act, 1875.	Section two hundred and sixty-four.
39 & 40 Vict. c. 36	Customs Consolidation Act 1876	The Customs Consolidation Act, 1876.	Sections two hundred and sixty-eight to two hundred and seventy-two.
40 & 41 Vict. c. 13	Customs, Inland Revenue, and Savings Bank Act 1877	The Customs, Inland Revenue, and Savings Bank Act, 1877.	Section four.
41 & 42 Vict. c. 52	Public Health (Ireland) Act 1878	The Public Health (Ireland) Act, 1878.	Section two hundred and sixty-three.
43 & 44 Vict. c. 19	Taxes Management Act 1880	The Taxes Management Act, 1880.	Section twenty, to "every such action or suit."
51 & 52 Vict. c. 43	County Courts Act 1888	The County Courts Act, 1888.	Section fifty-three.
53 & 54 Vict. c. 5	Lunacy Act 1890	The Lunacy Act, 1890.	Section three hundred and thirty-one.
53 & 54 Vict. c. 21	Inland Revenue Regulation Act 1890	The Inland Revenue Regulation Act, 1890.	Section twenty-eight.

== Subsequent developments ==
The whole act was repealed for England and Wales and Scotland by section 1(a) of the Law Reform (Limitation of Actions, etc.) Act 1954 (2 & 3 Eliz. 2. c. 36), which came into force on 4 June 1954. The act's provisions were replaced by more general rules on limitation of actions against public authorities contained in the 1954 act.
