= Dockyard Ports Regulation Act 1865 =

Act of the Parliament of the United Kingdom

Dockyard Ports Regulation Act 1865 (Note: Section 1.)
- Act of Parliament
- Parliament of the United Kingdom
- Long title: An Act for the Regulation of Dockyard Ports.
- Citation: 28 & 29 Vict. c. 125
- Territorial extent: United Kingdom

Dates
- Royal assent: 6 July 1865
- Commencement: 6 July 1865 (Note: The Acts of Parliament (Commencement) Act 1793.)

Other legislation
- Amended by: Statute Law Revision Act 1893; Public Authorities Protection Act 1893; Defence (Transfer of Functions) Act 1964; Sheriff Courts (Scotland) Act 1971; Criminal Procedure (Scotland) Act 1975; Criminal Justice Act 1982; Statute Law (Repeals) Act 1986; Statute Law (Repeals) Act 1993; Courts Act 2003; Justice Act (Northern Ireland) 2015

Status: Amended

Text of statute as originally enacted

Revised text of statute as amended

Text of the Dockyard Ports Regulation Act 1865 as in force today (including any amendments) within the United Kingdom, from legislation.gov.uk.

The Dockyard Ports Regulation Act 1865 (28 & 29 Vict. c. 125) is an act of the Parliament of the United Kingdom, which gained royal assent on 6 July 1865. It had the long title An Act for the Regulation of Dockyard Ports. It applied to "any port, harbour, haven, roadstead, sound, channel, creek, bay, or navigable river of the United Kingdom in, on, or near to which Her Majesty now or at any time hereafter has any dock, dockyard, steam factory yard, victualling yard, arsenal, wharf, or mooring" (Section 1), though it also reserved the monarch the right to define by Orders in Council the limits of a dockyard port for the act's purposes (Section 3).

The act inaugurated the post of a Queen's Harbour Master for each "Dockyard Port", to be appointed by the Admiralty to oversee the act's execution and to protect that port in general (Section 4), with powers to unmoor and search vessels and to remove wrecks (Sections 11–16), as well as setting out his involvement in legal actions (Section 24). It also gave justices of the peace jurisdiction over vessels passing by the shore of their jurisdiction (Section 22).

The act made it lawful for the monarch in council via Orders in Council to regulate and impose penalties for matters within such "Dockyard Ports", such as mooring for naval ships, loading and unloading gunpowder, using combustible materials like tar, imposing a speed limit on steam vessels in certain areas, having one person aboard every ship at all times and carrying lights and signals (Sections 5–7). Any such Orders in Council were to be put before Parliament within 30 days of being agreed (Section 26) and made available publicly by the Admiralty (Sections 8–9). It also set out the operation of the penalties imposed by such Orders in Council (Sections 17–21).

== Subsequent developments ==
Section 24 of the act was repealed by section 2 of, and the schedule to, the Public Authorities Protection Act 1893 (56 & 57 Vict. c. 61), which came into force on 1 January 1894.

In section 7, the words from "and such rules" onwards, sections 8, 9 and 10, and in section 26, the words from "within" (where first occurring) onwards were repealed by section 1(1) of, and part XII of schedule 1 to, the Statute Law (Repeals) Act 1986, which came into force on 2 May 1986.
