= Lascars Act 1823 =

Act of the Parliament of the United Kingdom

Lascars Act 1823 (Note: The citation of this act by this short title was authorised by section 1 of, and the first schedule to, the Short Titles Act 1896. Due to the repeal of those provisions it is now authorised by section 19(2) of the Interpretation Act 1978.)
- Act of Parliament
- Parliament of the United Kingdom
- Long title: An Act to consolidate and amend the several Laws now in force with respect to Trade from and to Places within the Limits of the Charter of the East India Company, and to make further Provisions with respect to such Trade; and to amend an Act of the present Session of Parliament, for the registering of Vessels, so far as it relates to Vessels registered in India.
- Citation: 4 Geo. 4. c. 80
- Territorial extent: United Kingdom

Dates
- Royal assent: 18 July 1823
- Commencement: 18 July 1823 (Note: The Acts of Parliament (Commencement) Act 1793.)
- Repealed: 31 July 1963
Other legislation
Amends	Registering of Vessels Act 1823; See § Repealed enactments
Repeals/revokes	See § Repealed enactments
Amended by	Navigation Act 1849; Public Authorities Protection Act 1893; Statute Law Revision Act 1950
Repealed by	Statute Law Revision Act 1963

Status: Repealed

Text of statute as originally enacted

The Lascars Act 1823 (4 Geo. 4. c. 80) was an act of the Parliament of the United Kingdom that repealed enactments related to lascars employed by the East India Company.

== Provisions ==
=== Repealed enactments ===
Section 1 of the act repealed 5 enactments, listed in that section.

Citation	Short title	Description	Extent of repeal
53 Geo. 3. c. 155	East India Company Act 1813	An Act passed in the Fifty fifth Year of His late Majesty King George the Third, intituled An Act for continuing in the East India Company for a further Term the Possession of the British Territories in India together with certain exclusive Privileges for establishing further Regulations for the Government of the said Territories and the better Administration of Justice within the same and for regulating the Trade to and from the Places within the Limits of the said Company's Charter.	As authorizes His Majesty's Subjects to carry on Trade and Traffic to and from the Ports and Places within the Limits of the said Company's Charter with all the Provisions Restrictions and Limitations in the same Act contained for the Regulation of such Trade and for the Disposition in the United Kingdom of all Articles manufactured of Silk Hair or Cotton Wool or any Mixture thereof imported under the Authority of the said last mentioned Act from any Port or Place within the Limits of the said Company's Charter.
54 Geo. 3. c. 34	East India Trade Act 1813	An Act passed in the Fifty fourth Year of His said late Majesty's Reign, intituled An Act for the further Regulation of the Trade to and from the Places within the Limits of the Charter of the East India Company.	The whole act.
55 Geo. 3. c. 116	Registry of Ships Built in India Act 1815	Another Act passed in the Fifty fifth Year of His said late Majesty's Reign, intituled An Act to make further Regula tions for the Registry of Ships built in India.	The whole act.
57 Geo. 3. c. 36	Trade, East Indies and Mediterranean Act 1817	Another Act passed in the Fifty seventh Year of His late Majesty's Reign, intituled An Act to regulate the Trade to and from the Places within the Limits of the Charter of the East India Company and certain Possessions of His Majesty in the Mediterranean.	The whole act.
1 & 2 Geo. 4. c. 65	East India, etc., Trade Act 1821	Another Act passed in the Second Year of the Reign of His present Majesty, intituled An Act for the further Regulation of Trade to and from Places within the Limits of the Charter of the East India Company except the Dominions of the Emperor of China and Ports or Places beyond the Limits of the said Charter belonging to any State or Country in Amity with His Majesty.	The whole act.

== Subsequent developments ==
Section 33 of the act was repealed by section 2 of, and the schedule to, the Public Authorities Protection Act 1893 (56 & 57 Vict. c. 61), which came into force on 1 January 1894.

Sections 25, 26 and 28 of the act were repealed by section 1(1) of, and the first schedule to, the Statute Law Revision Act 1950 (14 Geo. 6. c. 6), which came into force on 23 May 1950.

The whole act was repealed by section 1 of, and the schedule to, the Statute Law Revision Act 1963, which came into force on 31 July 1963.
