= Unlawful Drilling Act 1819 =

Act of the Parliament of the United Kingdom

Unlawful Drilling Act 1819 (Note: The citation of this act by this short title was authorised by section 1 of, and the first schedule to, the Short Titles Act 1896. Due to the repeal of those provisions it is now authorised by section 19(2) of the Interpretation Act 1978.)
- Act of Parliament
- Parliament of the United Kingdom
- Long title: An Act to prevent the training of Persons to the Use of Arms, and to the Practice of Military Evolutions and Exercise.
- Citation: 60 Geo. 3 & 1 Geo. 4. c. 1
- Territorial extent: United Kingdom

Dates
- Royal assent: 11 December 1819
- Commencement: 11 December 1819 (Note: The Acts of Parliament (Commencement) Act 1793.)
- Repealed: Republic of Ireland: 16 May 1983; England and Wales and Scotland: 21 July 2008
Other legislation
| Amended by | Statute Law Revision Act 1873; Statute Law Revision Act 1888; Statute Law Revision Act 1890; Public Authorities Protection Act 1893; Firearms Act 1920; Courts Act 1971; Sheriff Courts (Scotland) Act 1971; Statute Law Revision (Northern Ireland) Act 1980; Police and Criminal Evidence Act 1984; Statute Law (Repeals) Act 1989; Statute Law (Repeals) Act 1995; Serious Organised Crime and Police Act 2005; Police and Criminal Evidence (Amendment) (Northern Ireland) Order 2007 |
| Repealed by | Republic of Ireland: Statute Law Revision Act 1983; England and Wales and Scotland: Statute Law (Repeals) Act 2008; Still in force in Northern Ireland |
| Relates to | Unlawful Drilling Act 1819; Seizure of Arms Act 1819; Seditious Meetings Act 1819; Criminal Libel Act 1819; Newspapers, etc. Act 1819; Firearms (Northern Ireland) Order 1981; Northern Ireland (Emergency Provisions) Act 1991; Firearms (Northern Ireland) Order 2004 |

Status: Partially repealed

Status
- England and Wales: Repealed
- Scotland: Repealed
- Republic of Ireland: Repealed
- Northern Ireland: Amended

Text of statute as originally enacted

Revised text of statute as amended

Text of the Unlawful Drilling Act 1819 as in force today (including any amendments) within the United Kingdom, from legislation.gov.uk.

The Unlawful Drilling Act 1819 (60 Geo. 3 & 1 Geo. 4. c. 1), also known as the Training Prevention Act is an act of the Parliament of the United Kingdom. It was one of the Six Acts passed after the Peterloo massacre.

This act was excluded by article 54(4) of the Firearms (Northern Ireland) Order 1981 (SI 1981/155 (N.I. 2)), and by article 49(4) of the Firearms (Northern Ireland) Order 2004 (SI 2004/702 (N.I.)), and saved on 27 August 1991 by sections 32(4) and 69 of the Northern Ireland (Emergency Provisions) Act 1991.

== Provisions ==
=== Section 1 – Meetings and assemblies of persons for the purpose of being trained, or of practising military exercise, prohibited. Punishment ===
Before it was repealed, in England and Wales and Scotland, this section read:

All meetings and assemblies of persons for the purpose of training or drilling themselves, or of being trained or drilled to the use of arms, or for the purpose of practising military exercise, movements, or evolutions, without any lawful authority from his Majesty, or [a Secretary of State, or any officer deputed by him for the purpose],..., by commission or otherwise, for so doing, shall be and the same are hereby prohibited as dangerous to the peace and security of his Majesty’s liege subjects and of his government; and every person who shall be present at or attend any such meeting or assembly for the purpose of training and drilling any other person or persons to the use of arms or the practise of military exercise, movements, or evolutions, or who shall train or drill any other person or persons to the use of arms, or the practise of military exercise, movements, or evolutions, or who shall aid or assist therein, being legally convicted thereof, shall be liable to [imprisonment] for any term not exceeding seven years,...; and every person who shall attend or be present at any such meeting or assembly as aforesaid, for the purpose of being, or who shall at any such meeting or assembly be trained or drilled to the use of arms, or the practice of military exercise, movements, or evolutions, being legally convicted thereof, shall be liable to be punished by fine and imprisonment not exceeding two years, at the discretion of the court in which such conviction shall be had.

On 1 November 1995: The words "a Secretary of State, or any officer deputed by him for the purpose" were substituted for England and Wales and Scotland by section 1(2) of, and paragraph 1(a) of Schedule 2 to, the Statute Law (Repeals) Act 1995, which came into force on 8 November 1995. The words "a Secretary of State" were substituted for Northern Ireland by section 1(2) of, and paragraph 1(b) of schedule 2 to, the Statute Law (Repeals) Act 1995. The word "imprisonment" was substituted for the United Kingdom by section 1(2) of, and paragraph 1(c) of schedule 2 to, the Statute Law (Repeals) Act 1995, which came into force on 8 November 1995.

The repealed in the first place was repealed by section 1 of, and the first schedule to, the Statute Law Revision Act 1890 (53 & 54 Vict. c. 33), which came into force on 4 August 1890.

The word repealed in the second place were repealed for the United Kingdom on 1 November 1995 by section 1(1) of, and group 1 of part IV of schedule 1 to, the Statute Law (Repeals) Act 1995, which came into force on 8 November 1995.

Section 16 of the Firearms Act 1920 (10 & 11 Geo. 5. c. 43) provided that the powers of the Lieutenant and the two justices of the peace of a county under this act were to be exercisable by a Secretary of State or any officer deputed by him for the purpose.

In Northern Ireland, from 1953, the reference to penal servitude in this section had to be construed as a reference to imprisonment.

See the following cases:

- R v. Hunt (1820) 3 B & Ald 566, 1 St Tr (NS) 171, [1814 – 1823] All ER rep 456
- Redford v. Birley (1822) 3 Stark 76, 1 St Tr (NS) 1071
- Gogarty v. R (1849) 3 Cox 306 (Ir)

=== Section 2 – Persons so assembled may be detained and required to give bail, and prosecuted. ===
Before it was repealed, this section read:

... it shall be lawful for any justice of the peace or for any constable or peace officer ... to disperse any such unlawful meeting or assembly as aforesaid, and to arrest and detain any person present at or aiding, assisting, or abetting any such assembly or meeting as aforesaid; ...

The words of enactment at the start were repealed by section 1(1) of, and part I of the schedule to, the Statute Law Revision Act 1888 (51 & 52 Vict. c. 3), which came into force on 27 March 1888.

The words "or for any other person acting in their aid or assistance" were repealed for England and Wales by sections 111 and 174(2) of, and paragraph 1 of part 1 of schedule 7 and part 2 of schedule 17 to, the Serious Organised Crime and Police Act 2005.

They were repealed for Northern Ireland by paragraph 1 of schedule 1, and schedule 2, to the Police and Criminal Evidence (Amendment) (Northern Ireland) Order 2007 (SI 2007/288 (N.I.2)).

The words at the end were repealed for England and Wales by section 56(4) of, and part IV of schedule 11 to, the Courts Act 1971, and for Northern Ireland by part IV of the Statute Law Revision (Northern Ireland) Act 1980, which came into force on 13 November 1980.

This section was repealed in part for Northern Ireland by articles 90(2) and (3) of, and part I of schedule 7 to, the Police and Criminal Evidence Order 1989 (SI 1989/1341 (N.I.12)).

==== "Arrest and detain" ====
This section was repealed by section 26(1)(a) of the Police and Criminal Evidence Act 1984 in so far as it enabled a constable to arrest a person for an offence without a warrant.

So much of this section as conferred a power of arrest without warrant upon a constable, or persons in general (as distinct from persons of any description specified in or for the purposes of the enactment) was repealed, for England and Wales, to the extent that it was not already spent, by section 111 of, and paragraph 38 of part 2 of schedule 7 to, the Serious Organised Crime and Police Act 2005.

=== Section 3 – Sheriffs depute, &c. in Scotland to have the same powers as magistrates in England. ===
This section applied to Scotland. Before it was repealed it read:

The [sheriffs principal] and their substitutes, justices of the peace, magistrates of royal burghs, and all other inferior judges and magistrates, and also all high and petty constables, or other peace officers, of any county, city or town within Scotland, shall have such and the same powers and authorities for putting this present Act in execution within Scotland, as the justices of the peace and other magistrates and peace officers and constables aforesaid respectively have, by virtue of this Act, within and for other parts of the United Kingdom.

The words in brackets were substituted by section 4 of the Sheriff Courts (Scotland) Act 1971.

The functions of Burgh magistrates now exercisable by a Justice of the Peace, by section 1(2) of the District Courts (Scotland) Act 1975.

=== Section 7 – Prosecutions to be commenced within six months after offences ===
The words of enactment were repealed by section 1(1) of, and part I of the schedule to, the Statute Law Revision Act 1888 (51 & 52 Vict. c. 3), which came into force on 27 March 1888.

== Subsequent developments ==
Section 8 of the act was repealed by section 1 of, and the schedule to, the Statute Law Revision Act 1873 (36 & 37 Vict. c. 91), which came into force on 5 August 1873.

Sections 5 and 6 of the act were repealed by section 2 of, and the schedule to, the Public Authorities Protection Act 1893 (56 & 57 Vict. c. 61), which came into force on 1 January 1894.

Section 4 of the act was repealed by section 1(1) of, and group 5 of part I of schedule 1 to, the Statute Law (Repeals) Act 1989, which came into force on 16 November 1989.

The whole act was repealed for the Republic of Ireland by section 1 of, and part IV of the schedule to, the Statute Law Revision Act 1983, which came into force on 16 May 1983.

The whole act was repealed for England & Wales and Scotland by part 3 of schedule 1 to the Statute Law (Repeals) Act 2008, which came into force on 8 November 1995. It is still in force in Northern Ireland.
