= Worsted Act 1776 =

Act of the Parliament of Great Britain

Worsted Act 1776 (Note: The citation of this act by this short title was authorised by section 5 of, and the second schedule to, the Statute Law Revision Act 1948. Due to the repeal of those provisions, it is now authorised by section 19(2) of the Interpretation Act 1978.)
- Act of Parliament
- Parliament of Great Britain
- Long title: An Act for more effectually preventing Frauds and Abuses committed by Persons employed in the Manufacture of Combing Wool, Worsted Yarn, and Goods made from Worsted in the Counties of York, Lancaster, and Chester. (Note: These words are printed against this act in the second column of the second schedule to the Statute Law Revision Act 1948, which is headed "Title".)
- Citation: 17 Geo. 3. c. 11
- Territorial extent: Great Britain

Dates
- Royal assent: 27 March 1777
- Commencement: 31 October 1776 (Note: Start of session.)
- Repealed: 2 May 1986

Other legislation
- Amended by: Statute Law Revision Act 1861; Summary Jurisdiction Act 1884; Public Authorities Protection Act 1893; Theft Act 1968
- Repealed by: Statute Law (Repeals) Act 1986

Status: Repealed

Text of statute as originally enacted

The Worsted Act 1776 (17 Geo. 3. c. 11) was an act of the Parliament of Great Britain.

== Subsequent developments ==
Sections 17, 18, 19, and so much as relates to limitation of actions for anything done in pursuance of the act, as to pleading of general issue, and as to treble costs, was repealed by section 1 of, and the schedule to, the Statute Law Revision Act 1861 (24 & 25 Vict. c. 101), which came into force on 6 August 1861.

Section 24 of the act was repealed by section 2 of, and the schedule to, the Public Authorities Protection Act 1893 (56 & 57 Vict. c. 61), which came into force on 1 January 1894.

The whole act was repealed by section 1(1) of, and the part XIII of schedule 1 to, the Statute Law (Repeals) Act 1986, which came into force on 2 May 1986.
