= Seditious Meetings Act 1819 =

Act of the Parliament of the United Kingdom

- Act of Parliament
- Parliament of the United Kingdom
- Long title: An Act for more effectually preventing Seditious Meetings and Assemblies; to continue in force until the End of the Session of Parliament next after five Years from the passing of the Act.
- Citation: 60 Geo. 3 & 1 Geo. 4. c. 6
- Introduced by: Lord Castlereagh (Lords)
- Territorial extent: United Kingdom (Note: Section 40.)

Dates
- Royal assent: 24 December 1819
- Commencement: 25 December 1819 (City of London); 3 January 1820 (United Kingdom)
- Expired: 6 July 1825
- Repealed: 5 August 1873
Other legislation
Amends	Seditious Meetings Act 1817
Repealed by	Statute Law Revision Act 1873
Relates to	Unlawful Drilling Act 1819; Seizure of Arms Act 1819; Pleading in Misdemeanor Act 1819; Criminal Libel Act 1819; Newspapers, etc. Act 1819; Seditious Meetings Act 1795; Seditious Meetings Act 1817

Status: Repealed

Text of statute as originally enacted

The Seditious Meetings Act 1819 (60 Geo. 3 & 1 Geo. 4. c. 6) was an act of the Parliament of the United Kingdom that made it illegal to hold an outdoor meeting of more than 50 people without prior authorisation. It was one of the Six Acts passed after the Peterloo massacre.

== Provisions ==
The provisions of the act were similar to those of previous Seditious Meetings Acts, such as those of Seditious Meetings Act 1795 (36 Geo. 3. c. 8) and Seditious Meetings Act 1817 (57 Geo. 3. c. 19), although more severe constraints were added. The law forbade all meetings of more than 50 people called "for the purpose...of deliberating upon any public grievance, or upon any matter or thing relating to any trade, manufacture, business, or profession, or upon any matter in church or state," unless the meeting had been summoned by an authorised official. The prohibition did not apply to meetings where the attendees were all inhabitants of a single parish or township, but written notice was required to be submitted to a justice of the peace at least six days prior, and the JP was empowered to change the time and place of the meeting at his discretion. Attendees were prohibited from carrying arms, and the display of flags, banners and other ensigns or emblems at the assembly was banned.

Under the act, sheriffs and other officials were authorised to attend any meetings held within their jurisdictions. In the event that the meeting was found to be unlawful, they could order its participants to disperse; anyone who ignored such an order was liable to be punished with up to seven years of transportation.

The act also established regulations for places where lectures or debates were held, requiring these to be licensed and allowing officials to inspect them. Universities and certain other institutions, however, were exempted from these provisions.

Unlike the Seditious Meetings Act 1817 (57 Geo. 3. c. 19), the 1819 act allowed for meetings to be held in the parishes of St Margaret and St John in Westminster. On the other hand, its provisions were extended to Ireland, which had been exempted under the previous law. The act took effect in London and the surrounding regions the day after its passage, and in the rest of the country after ten days, and was to remain in force for five years.

== Significance ==
The act was passed by Lord Liverpool's government in December 1819. It was one of the Six Acts, which were intended to suppress radical activities in the aftermath of the Peterloo massacre.

This piece of legislation can be seen as exploiting The Sword of Damocles effect by quickly suppressing any symptom of distress effectively and efficiently in order to prevent a major outbreak of revolution. This was one piece of legislation among many others that blackened the reputation of Lord Liverpool's government until the Prime Minister's cabinet reshuffle in 1822, which ushered in Enlightened Liberal Toryism, an ideology that characterised British Politics during the mid-1820s.

== Subsequent developments ==
The whole act was repealed by section 1 of, and the schedule to, the Statute Law Revision Act 1873 (36 & 37 Vict. c. 91), which came into force on 5 August 1873.

== See also ==
- Six Acts
- Sedition
