= King's Harbour Master =

Public shipping official in the United Kingdom

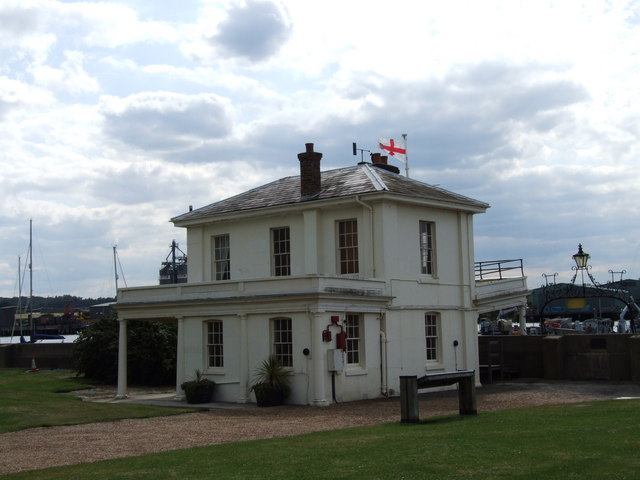
Assistant Queen's Harbour Master's Office, Chatham Dockyard (built for the Master Attendant in 1770).

A King's Harbour Master (abbreviated as KHM, also known as Queen's Harbour Master or QHM during the reign of a female monarch) is a harbourmaster and public official in Canada and the United Kingdom. Their official responsibilities includes enforcing the regulations of a particular harbour or port, ensure port operations are done correctly, and maintain safety of navigation.

== Canada ==
Flag of the King's Harbour Master in Canada

In Canada, the responsibilities of a King's Harbour Master's includes assisting warships in and out of harbours, providing refit services through specialty barges, oversee environmental protection of the harbour, and maintain navy buoys for the Royal Canadian Navy. In French, a KHM is called a capitaine de port de Sa Majesté (lit. 'His Majesty's Captain of the Port'). King's Harbour Masters are employed in several harbours, including Esquimalt Harbour, Nanoose Harbour, and the CFB Halifax.

The functions of CFB Esquimalt's QHM was transferred to the base operations officer of CFB Esquimalt in 1968, with the QHM staff being adjuncts to the base. However, the Esquimalt QHM was re-established as its own unit in 1974. The QHM for CFB Esquimalt later became the harbour authority for the entire Esquimalt Harbour after Transport Canada transferred responsibility of the harbour to the Department of National Defence. As a result, ship movement in Esquimalt Harbour requires the approval of the Esquimalt KHM.

A flag for the Queen's Harbour Masters was approved on 1 December 1999, and registered with the Canadian Heraldic Authority. The flag features a Canadian flag with a white border, with the maple leaf charged with a plate that includes the royal crown with the letters Q.H.M. inscribed above and C.P.S.M below it.

== United Kingdom ==
Flag of the King's Harbour Master

In the United Kingdom, a King's Harbour Master is a public official with the duty of keeping the port secure for both military and civilian shipping. There are three King's Harbour Masters in the UK, one for each of the major naval ports of the UK: the Clyde Dockyard Port of Gareloch and Loch Long in the Firth of Clyde, the Dockyard Port of Portsmouth in Portsmouth, and the Dockyard Port of Plymouth in Plymouth. The powers of the King's Harbour Masters are defined in the Dockyard Ports Regulation Act 1865. Although legislation does not require it, most KHMs have been serving officers in the Royal Navy. Queen's Harbour Masters were first appointed in the first half of the nineteenth century; there was some overlap with the duties of Master Attendants in HM Dockyards, and the two offices were held by the same person in several instances.

The King's Harbour Masters have their own flag, consisting of a white-bordered Union Flag with a white circle on it, within which there is a crown and the letters "KHM".
