= Newspaper Publication Act 1798 =

Act of the Parliament of Great Britain

- Act of Parliament
- Parliament of Great Britain
- Long title: An act for preventing the mischiefs arising from the printing and publishing newspapers, and papers of a like nature, by persons not known; and for regulating the printing and publication of such papers in other respects.
- Citation: 38 Geo. 3. c. 78
- Territorial extent: Great Britain

Dates
- Royal assent: 28 June 1798
- Commencement: 7 August 1798 (Note: Section 1.)
- Repealed: 15 September 1836
Other legislation
Repealed by	Stamp Duties on Newspapers Act 1836
Relates to	Newspaper and Stamp Duties Act 1819

Status: Repealed

Text of statute as originally enacted

The Newspaper Publication Act 1798 (38 Geo. 3. c. 78) was an act of the Parliament of Great Britain. The act restricted the printing and circulation of newspapers and made newspaper proprietors identify themselves to the government. The Act aimed to reduce slander.

== Subsequent developments ==
The whole act was repealed by section 32 of the Stamp Duties on Newspapers Act 1836 (6 & 7 Will. 4. c. 76), which came into force on 15 September 1836.
