= Six Acts =

1819 UK counter-revolutionary legislation

The Six Acts were legislation introduced by the Liverpool ministry to prevent future disturbances following the Peterloo Massacre in Manchester on 16 August 1819. The acts were intended to suppress any meetings for the purpose of radical reform. Élie Halévy considered them a panic-stricken extension of "the counter-revolutionary terror ... under the direct patronage of Lord Sidmouth and his colleagues"; some later historians have treated them as relatively mild gestures towards law and order, only tentatively enforced.

== Background and passage ==
Following the Yeomanry killing of unarmed men and women in St Peter's Field (Peterloo), a wave of protest meetings swept the North of England, spilling over into the Midlands and the Lowlands, and involving in all some seventeen counties. Local magistrates appealed in the face of the protests for central support; and in response the Parliament of the United Kingdom was reconvened on 23 November and the new acts were introduced by the Home Secretary, Henry Addington. By 30 December the legislation was passed, despite the opposition of the Whigs to both their principles and many of their details.

The acts were aimed at gagging radical newspapers, preventing large meetings, and reducing what the government saw as the possibility of armed insurrection. During the Commons debates, each of the parties appealed to the example of the French Revolution to make their case. The Tories pointed to the weakness of the French forces of law and order; the Whigs, conversely, to the need for the safety valve of free speech and a free press.

Strengthened by their success at the 1818 elections, the Whigs were able to make three significant amendments to the bills as originally proposed: public meetings were to be allowed behind closed doors, and the ban on outside meetings was to be limited in time; transportation of Press offenders was made more difficult; and the curtailment of legal delays was extended to include prosecution as well as defendant. Nevertheless, the Six Acts were eventually passed by prime minister Lord Liverpool and his colleagues, as part of their repressive approach focused on preventing a British revolution.

== Details of the acts ==
Seizure of Arms Act 1819
- Act of Parliament
- Parliament of the United Kingdom
- Long title: An Act to authorise Justices of the Peace in certain disturbed Counties to seize and detain Arms collected or kept for purposes dangerous to the Public Peace to continue in force until the Twenty fifth Day of March One thousand eight hundred and twenty two.
- Citation: 60 Geo. 3 & 1 Geo. 4. c. 2
- Territorial extent: United Kingdom

Dates
- Royal assent: 18 December 1819
- Commencement: 18 December 1819 (Note: The Acts of Parliament (Commencement) Act 1793.)
- Expired: 25 March 1822 (Note: Section 10.)
- Repealed: 5 August 1873
Other legislation
Repealed by	Statute Law Revision Act 1873
Relates to	Unlawful Drilling Act 1819; Pleading in Misdemeanor Act 1819; Seditious Meetings Act 1819; Criminal Libel Act 1819; Newspapers, etc. Act 1819

Status: Repealed

Text of statute as originally enacted

Pleading in Misdemeanor Act 1819 (Note: The citation of this act by this short title was authorised by section 1 of, and the first schedule to, the Short Titles Act 1896. Due to the repeal of those provisions it is now authorised by section 19(2) of the Interpretation Act 1978.)
- Act of Parliament
- Parliament of the United Kingdom
- Long title: An Act to prevent Delay in the Administration of Justice in Cases of Misdemeanor.
- Citation: 60 Geo. 3 & 1 Geo. 4. c. 4
- Territorial extent: England and Wales; Scotland; (Note: Section 1.)

Dates
- Royal assent: 23 December 1819
- Commencement: 23 December 1819
- Repealed: England and Wales: 1 January 1939; Northern Ireland: 18 April 1979 (Note: The Judicature (Northern Ireland) Act 1978 (Commencement No. 4) Order 1979 (SI 1979/422).)
Other legislation
Amended by	Criminal Procedure Act 1851; Statute Law Revision Act 1873
Repealed by	England and Wales: Administration of Justice (Miscellaneous Provisions) Act 1938; Judicature (Northern Ireland) Act 1978
Relates to	Unlawful Drilling Act 1819; Seizure of Arms Act 1819; Seditious Meetings Act 1819; Criminal Libel Act 1819; Newspapers, etc. Act 1819

Status: Repealed

Text of statute as originally enacted

Criminal Libel Act 1819
- Act of Parliament
- Parliament of the United Kingdom
- Long title: An Act for the more effectual Prevention and Punishment of blasphemous and seditious Libels.
- Citation: 60 Geo. 3 & 1 Geo. 4. c. 8
- Territorial extent: United Kingdom of Great Britain and Ireland

Dates
- Royal assent: 30 December 1819
- Commencement: 30 December 1819
Other legislation
Amended by	Libels Act 1830; Statute Law Revision Act 1873; Statute Law Revision Act 1888; Statute Law Revision Act 1890; Public Authorities Protection Act 1893; Criminal Law Act 1967; Criminal Justice and Immigration Act 2008
Relates to	Unlawful Drilling Act 1819; Seizure of Arms Act 1819; Pleading in Misdemeanor Act 1819; Seditious Meetings Act 1819; Newspapers, etc. Act 1819

Status: Partially repealed

Text of statute as originally enacted

Text of the Six Acts as in force today (including any amendments) within the United Kingdom, from legislation.gov.uk.

Newspaper and Stamp Duties Act 1819
- Act of Parliament
- Parliament of the United Kingdom
- Long title: An Act to subject certain Publications to the Duties of Stamps upon Newspapers and to make other Regulations for restraining the Abuses arising from the Publication of blasphemous and seditious Libels.
- Citation: 60 Geo. 3 & 1 Geo. 4. c. 9
- Territorial extent: United Kingdom

Dates
- Royal assent: 30 December 1819
- Commencement: 9 January 1820
- Repealed: 12 July 1969
Other legislation
Repealed by	Newspapers, Printers, and Reading Rooms Repeal Act 1869
Relates to	Newspaper Publication Act 1798; Stamps (Ireland) (No. 3) Act 1815; Plate Duties Act 1815; Probate Duty (Ireland) Act 1816; Unlawful Drilling Act 1819; Seizure of Arms Act 1819; Pleading in Misdemeanor Act 1819; Seditious Meetings Act 1819; Criminal Libel Act 1819

Status: Repealed

Text of statute as originally enacted

The six acts were:

- The Unlawful Drilling Act 1819 (60 Geo. 3 & 1 Geo. 4. c. 1), also known as the Training Prevention Act, made any person attending a meeting for the purpose of receiving training or drill in weapons liable to arrest and transportation. More simply stated, military training of any sort was to be conducted only by municipal bodies and above.
- The Seizure of Arms Act 1819 (60 Geo. 3 & 1 Geo. 4. c. 2) gave local magistrates the powers, within the disturbed counties, to search any private property for weapons and seize them and arrest the owners.
- The Pleading in Misdemeanor Act 1819 (60 Geo. 3 & 1 Geo. 4. c. 4) attempted to increase the speed of the administration of justice by reducing the opportunities for bail and allowing for speedier court processing.
- The Seditious Meetings Act 1819 (60 Geo. 3 & 1 Geo. 4. c. 6) required the permission of a sheriff or magistrate in order to convene any public meeting of more than 50 people if the subject of that meeting was concerned with "church or state" matters. Additional people could not attend such meetings unless they were inhabitants of the parish.
- The Criminal Libel Act 1819 (60 Geo. 3 & 1 Geo. 4. c. 8), also known as the Blasphemous and Seditious Libels Act, toughened the existing laws to provide for more punitive sentences for the authors of such writings. The maximum sentence was increased to fourteen years' transportation.
- The Newspaper and Stamp Duties Act 1819 (60 Geo. 3 & 1 Geo. 4. c. 9) extended and increased taxes to cover those publications which had escaped duty by publishing opinion and not news. Publishers were also required to post a bond for their behaviour.

== Repeal of the acts, and their influence ==
Different time-scales applied to the different acts.

- The prohibition of drilling was maintained into the twentieth century, and only repealed in Great Britain in 2008. It is still in force in Northern Ireland.
- By contrast, the seizure of arms was set up to elapse after 27 months; while the Seditious Meetings Prevention Act had a five-year time limit built in, and was repealed in 1824.
- G. M. Trevelyan considered that "The most lasting injury to the community was done by the Act imposing a four-penny stamp on all periodical publications"—a charge reduced (to a penny) in 1836, before such taxes on knowledge finally vanished mid-century.

The Six Acts went down in folk history, alongside Peterloo, as symbols of the repressive nature of the Pittite regime.

== See also ==
- Cato Street Conspiracy
- Coercion Act
- Earl of Eldon
- Police state
- Radicalism (historical)

== Bibliography ==
- Halévy, Élie (1961). The Liberal Awakening. London.
- McCord, Norman; Purdue, Bill (2007). British History, 1815–1914. Oxford: Oxford University Press.
- Plowright, John (1996). Regency England: The Age of Lord Liverpool. London: Routledge. ISBN 978-0-203-13022-3.
- Steinberg, S. H. (1963). A New Dictionary of British History. London.
- Trevelyan, G. M. (1922). British History in the Nineteenth Century. London.
