= List of acts of the 2nd session of the 6th Parliament of the United Kingdom =

This is a complete list of acts of the 2nd session of the 6th Parliament of the United Kingdom which had regnal year 60 Geo. 3 & 1 Geo. 4. This session met from 23 November 1819 until 28 February 1820.

Note that the first parliament of the United Kingdom was held in 1801; parliaments between 1707 and 1800 were either parliaments of Great Britain or of Ireland). For acts passed up until 1707, see the list of acts of the Parliament of England and the list of acts of the Parliament of Scotland. For acts passed from 1707 to 1800, see the list of acts of the Parliament of Great Britain. See also the list of acts of the Parliament of Ireland.

For acts of the devolved parliaments and assemblies in the United Kingdom, see the list of acts of the Scottish Parliament, the list of acts of the Northern Ireland Assembly, and the list of acts and measures of Senedd Cymru; see also the list of acts of the Parliament of Northern Ireland.

The number shown after each act's title is its chapter number. Acts passed before 1963 are cited using this number, preceded by the year(s) of the reign during which the relevant parliamentary session was held; thus the Union with Ireland Act 1800 is cited as "39 & 40 Geo. 3 c. 67", meaning the 67th act passed during the session that started in the 39th year of the reign of George III and which finished in the 40th year of that reign. Note that the modern convention is to use Arabic numerals in citations (thus "41 Geo. 3" rather than "41 Geo. III"). Acts of the last session of the Parliament of Great Britain and the first session of the Parliament of the United Kingdom are both cited as "41 Geo. 3". Acts passed from 1963 onwards are simply cited by calendar year and chapter number.

All modern acts have a short title, e.g. "the Local Government Act 2003". Some earlier acts also have a short title given to them by later acts, such as by the Short Titles Act 1896.

== 1819 ==
The second session of the 6th Parliament of the United Kingdom, which met from 23 November 1819 until 28 February 1820.

This session was also traditionally cited as 60 G. 3 & 1 G. 4.

=== Public general acts ===
| Short title | Citation | Royal assent |
Long title
| Unlawful Drilling Act 1819 or the Training Prevention Act 1819 | 60 Geo. 3 & 1 Geo. 4. c. 1 | 11 December 1819 |
An Act to prevent the training of Persons to the Use of Arms, and to the Practice of Military Evolutions and Exercise.
| Seizure of Arms Act 1819 (repealed) | 60 Geo. 3 & 1 Geo. 4. c. 2 | 18 December 1819 |
An Act to authorise Justices of the Peace in certain disturbed Counties to seize and detain Arms collected or kept for purposes dangerous to the Public Peace to continue in force until the Twenty fifth Day of March One thousand eight hundred and twenty two. (Repealed by Statute Law Revision Act 1873 (36 & 37 Vict. c. 91))
| Duties on Malt, etc. Act 1819 (repealed) | 60 Geo. 3 & 1 Geo. 4. c. 3 | 18 December 1819 |
An Act for continuing to His Majesty certain Duties on Malt, Sugar, Tobacco and Snuff, in Great Britain; and on Pensions, Offices, and Personal Estates, in England; for the Service of the Year One thousand eight hundred and twenty. (Repealed by Statute Law Revision Act 1873 (36 & 37 Vict. c. 91))
| Pleading in Misdemeanor Act 1819 or the Pleading in Misdemeanour Act 1819 or the Misdemeanours Act 1819 | 60 Geo. 3 & 1 Geo. 4. c. 4 | 23 December 1819 |
An Act to prevent Delay in the Administration of Justice in Cases of Misdemeanor.
| Labour in Cotton Mills, etc. Act 1819 (repealed) | 60 Geo. 3 & 1 Geo. 4. c. 5 | 23 December 1819 |
An Act to amend an Act of the last Session of Parliament, (Note: Cotton Mills and Factories Act 1819 (59 Geo. 3. c. 66)) to make further Provision for the Regulation of Cotton Mills and Factories, and for the Preservation of the Health of young Persons employed therein. (Repealed by Labour in Cotton Mills Act 1831)
| Seditious Meetings, etc. Act 1819 (repealed) | 60 Geo. 3 & 1 Geo. 4. c. 6 | 24 December 1819 |
An Act for more effectually preventing Seditious Meetings and Assemblies; to continue in force until the End of the Session of Parliament next after five Years from the passing of the Act. (Repealed by Statute Law Revision Act 1873 (36 & 37 Vict. c. 91))
| Parliamentary Elections Act 1819 (repealed) | 60 Geo. 3 & 1 Geo. 4. c. 7 | 24 December 1819 |
An Act to amend an Act of the Forty second Year of the Reign of His present Majesty, (Note: Controverted Elections Act 1802 (42 Geo. 3. c. 84)) for regulating the Trial of controverted Elections or Returns of Members to serve in the United Parliament for Ireland. (Repealed by Statute Law Revision Act 1873 (36 & 37 Vict. c. 91))
| Criminal Libel Act 1819 or the Blasphemous and Seditious Libels Act 1819 | 60 Geo. 3 & 1 Geo. 4. c. 8 | 30 December 1819 |
An Act for the more effectual Prevention and Punishment of blasphemous and seditious Libels.
| Newspapers, etc. Act 1819 (Note: This was the last act of the reign of King George III.) or the Newspaper and Stamp Duties Act 1819 (repealed) | 60 Geo. 3 & 1 Geo. 4. c. 9 | 30 December 1819 |
An Act to subject certain Publications to the Duties of Stamps upon Newspapers and to make other Regulations for restraining the Abuses arising from the Publication of blasphemous and seditious Libels. (Repealed by Newspapers, Printers, and Reading Rooms Repeal Act 1869 (32 & 33 Vict. c. 24))

=== Local acts ===
| Short title | Citation | Royal assent |
Long title
| Bread Industry (London) Act 1819 (repealed) | 60 Geo. 3 & 1 Geo. 4. c. i | 30 December 1819 |
An Act to continue until the Twenty fourth Day of June One thousand eight hundred and twenty, an Act passed in the Fifty ninth Year of His present Majesty, (Note: London Bread Trade Act 1819 (59 Geo. 3. c. cxxvii)) intituled "An Act to alter and amend an Act made in the Fifty fifth Year of the Reign of His present Majesty, (Note: London Bread Trade Act 1815 (55 Geo. 3. c. xcix)) intituled 'An Act to repeal the Acts now in force relating to Bread to be sold in the City of London and the Liberties thereof, and within the Weekly Bills of Mortality and Ten Miles of the Royal Exchange; and to prevent the Adulteration of Meal, Flour and Bread, and to regulate the Weights of Bread within the same Limits.'" (Repealed by Statute Law (Repeals) Act 2008)

=== Private acts ===
| Short title | Citation | Royal assent |
Long title
| Lexden Inclosure Act 1819 (Note: This act was not printed by the King's Printer.) | 60 Geo. 3 & 1 Geo. 4. c. 1 Pr. | 30 December 1819 |
An Act for inclosing Lands in the Manor and Parish of Lexden, within the Liberties of the Borough of Colchester, in the County of Essex.
| Wythop Inclosure Act 1819 | 60 Geo. 3 & 1 Geo. 4. c. 2 Pr. | 30 December 1819 |
An Act for inclosing Lands within the Manor of Wythop, in the Parish of Brigham, in the County of Cumberland.

=== Sources ===
- "60° Geo. III. & 1° Geo. IV.". The Statutes of the United Kingdom of Great Britain and Ireland, 60 Geo. III. & 1 Geo. IV. 1819-1820. And 1 Geo. IV. 1820. London. 1820. pp. 1–67 – via Google Books.
- Journals of the House of Commons. Vol. 75: Sess. 1819-20 and 1820. London: His Majesty's Stationery Office. pp. 3–85 – via Google Books.

== 1820 ==
Continuing the second session of the 6th Parliament of the United Kingdom, which met from 23 November 1819 until 28 February 1820.

This session was also traditionally cited as 60 G. 3. & 1 G. 4.

=== Public general acts ===
| Short title | Citation | Royal assent |
Long title
| Indemnity Act 1820 (Note: This was the first act of the reign of King George VI.) (repealed) | 60 Geo. 3 & 1 Geo. 4. c. 10 | 28 February 1820 |
An Act to indemnify such Persons in the United Kingdom as have omitted to qualify themselves for Offices and Employments, and for extending the Time limited for certain of those Purposes respectively, until the Twenty fifth Day of March One thousand eight hundred and twenty one; and to permit such Persons in Great Britain as have omitted to make and file Affidavits of the Execution of Indentures of Clerks to Attorneys and Solicitors, to make and file the same on or before the First Day of Hilary Term One thou sand eight hundred and twenty one, and to allow Persons to make and file such Affidavits, although the Persons whom they served shall have neglected to take out their Annual Certificates. (Repealed by Promissory Oaths Act 1871 (34 & 35 Vict. c. 48))
| Parliamentary Elections (Ireland) Act 1820 | 60 Geo. 3 & 1 Geo. 4. c. 11 | 28 February 1820 |
An Act for the better Regulation of Polls, and for making further Provision touching the Election of Members to serve in Parliament for Ireland.
| Expiring Laws Continuance Act 1820 (repealed) | 60 Geo. 3 & 1 Geo. 4. c. 12 | 28 February 1820 |
An Act to continue until the Twenty fifth Day of June One thousand eight hundred and twenty, such Laws as may expire within a limited Period. (Repealed by Statute Law Revision Act 1873 (36 & 37 Vict. c. 91))
| Mutiny Act Continuance Act 1820 (repealed) | 60 Geo. 3 & 1 Geo. 4. c. 13 | 28 February 1820 |
An Act for continuing an Act made in the last Session of Parliament, intituled "An Act for punishing Mutiny and Desertion and for the better Payment of the Army and their Quarters." (Note: Mutiny Act 1819 (59 Geo. 3. c. 9)) (Repealed by Statute Law Revision Act 1873 (36 & 37 Vict. c. 91))
| Local Jurisdictions Act 1820 (repealed) | 60 Geo. 3 & 1 Geo. 4. c. 14 | 28 February 1820 |
An Act to remedy certain Inconveniences in local and exclusive Jurisdictions. (Repealed by Statute Law Revision Act 1873 (36 & 37 Vict. c. 91))

=== Local acts ===
| Short title | Citation | Royal assent |
Long title
| Liverpool Church Act 1820 | 60 Geo. 3 & 1 Geo. 4. c. ii | 28 February 1820 |
An Act for regulating and supporting a new Church or Chapel within the Town of Liverpool, in the County Palatine of Lancaster, and for the Solemnization of Marriages therein.
| River Lea Bridge and Roads Act 1820 (repealed) | 60 Geo. 3 & 1 Geo. 4. c. iii | 28 February 1820 |
An Act to continue and amend several Acts for building a Bridge over the River Lea, at Jeremy's Ferry, and for repairing Roads from thence into the great Roads at Snaresbrooke, in the County of Essex, and at Clapton, in the County of Middlesex. (Repealed by Metropolis Roads Act 1826 (7 Geo. 4. c. cxlii))
| Dumfries Turnpike Roads Act 1820 (repealed) | 60 Geo. 3 & 1 Geo. 4. c. iv | 28 February 1820 |
An Act to amend an Act made in the Fifty ninth Year of His late Majesty, (Note: Roads in Dumfries Act 1819 (59 Geo. 3. c. cx)) for making and maintaining certain Turnpike Roads within the County of Dumfries, and the other Highways, Bridges and Ferries therein; and for more effectually converting into Money the Statute Labour in the said County. (Repealed by Roads in Dumfries Act 1829 (10 Geo. 4. c. cxi))
| Buildwas Bridge and Tern Bridge Road Act 1820 (repealed) | 60 Geo. 3 & 1 Geo. 4. c. v | 28 February 1820 |
An Act for enlarging the Term and Powers of Two Acts of His late Majesty, (Note: Salop Roads Act 1778 (18 Geo. 3. c. 88)) (Note: Watling Street Turnpike Road Act 1799 (39 Geo. 3. c. 16)) for repairing the Road from Buildwas Bridge, to join the Watling Street Road, at Tern Bridge, in the County of Salop. (Repealed by Statute Law (Repeals) Act 2013 (c. 2))
| Much Wenlock and Gleeton Hill and Cressage Roads Act 1820 | 60 Geo. 3 & 1 Geo. 4. c. vi | 28 February 1820 |
An Act for enlarging the Term and Powers of several Acts of King George the Second and His late Majesty, for repairing several Roads leading from the Market House in the Town of Much Wenlock, and from Gleeton Hill to Cressage, in the County of Salop.

=== Private acts ===
| Short title | Citation | Royal assent |
Long title
| Hinxton Inclosure Act 1820 (Note: This act was not printed by the King's Printer.) | 60 Geo. 3 & 1 Geo. 4. c. 3 Pr. | 28 February 1820 |
An Act for inclosing and exonerating from Tithes Lands in the Parish of Hinxton in the County of Cambridge.

=== Sources ===
- "60° Geo. III. & 1° Geo. IV.". The Statutes of the United Kingdom of Great Britain and Ireland, 60 Geo. III. & 1 Geo. IV. 1819-1820. And 1 Geo. IV. 1820. London. 1820. pp. 1–67 – via Google Books.
- Journals of the House of Commons. Vol. 75: Sess. 1819-20 and 1820. London: His Majesty's Stationery Office. pp. 89–104 – via Google Books.
- Chronological Table of and Index to the Statutes. Vol. 1: To the End of the Session 59 Vict. Sess. 2 (1895) (13th ed.). London: Her Majesty's Stationery Office. 1896. pp. 226–227 – via Google Books.

== See also ==
- List of acts of the Parliament of the United Kingdom
