= List of acts of the Parliament of the United Kingdom from 1808 =

This is a complete list of acts of the Parliament of the United Kingdom for the year 1808.

Note that the first parliament of the United Kingdom was held in 1801; parliaments between 1707 and 1800 were either parliaments of Great Britain or of Ireland). For acts passed up until 1707, see the list of acts of the Parliament of England and the list of acts of the Parliament of Scotland. For acts passed from 1707 to 1800, see the list of acts of the Parliament of Great Britain. See also the list of acts of the Parliament of Ireland.

For acts of the devolved parliaments and assemblies in the United Kingdom, see the list of acts of the Scottish Parliament, the list of acts of the Northern Ireland Assembly, and the list of acts and measures of Senedd Cymru; see also the list of acts of the Parliament of Northern Ireland.

The number shown after each act's title is its chapter number. Acts passed before 1963 are cited using this number, preceded by the year(s) of the reign during which the relevant parliamentary session was held; thus the Union with Ireland Act 1800 is cited as "39 & 40 Geo. 3 c. 67", meaning the 67th act passed during the session that started in the 39th year of the reign of George III and which finished in the 40th year of that reign. Note that the modern convention is to use Arabic numerals in citations (thus "41 Geo. 3" rather than "41 Geo. III"). Acts of the last session of the Parliament of Great Britain and the first session of the Parliament of the United Kingdom are both cited as "41 Geo. 3". Acts passed from 1963 onwards are simply cited by calendar year and chapter number.

All modern acts have a short title, e.g. "the Local Government Act 2003". Some earlier acts also have a short title given to them by later acts, such as by the Short Titles Act 1896.

== 48 Geo. 3 ==
The second session of the 4th Parliament of the United Kingdom, which met from 21 January 1808 until 4 July 1808.

This session was also traditionally cited as 48 G. 3.

=== Public general acts ===
Short title	Citation	Royal assent
Long title
Issue and Payment of Exchequer Bills Act 1808 (repealed)	48 Geo. 3. c. 1	27 February 1808
An Act for regulating the issuing and paying off of Exchequer Bills. (Repealed by Exchequer Bills and Bonds Act 1866 (29 & 30 Vict. c. 25))
Duties on Malt, etc. Act 1808 (repealed)	48 Geo. 3. c. 2	27 February 1808
An Act for continuing to His Majesty certain Duties on Malt, Sugar, Tobacco, and Snuffs, in Great Britain; and on Pensions and Offices in England and for repealing so much of certain Acts as relate to certain Duties of Sixpence and One Shilling respectively on Offices and Pensions; and for regranting the said Duties of Sixpence and One Shilling respectively, and the said other Duties, for the Service of the Year One thousand eight hundred and eight. (Repealed by Statute Law Revision Act 1861 (24 & 25 Vict. c. 101))
Advance from Bank of England Act 1808 (repealed)	48 Geo. 3. c. 3	27 February 1808
An Act for empowering the Governor and Company of the Bank of England to advance the Sum of Three Millions, towards the Supply for the Service of the Year One thousand eight hundred and eight. (Repealed by Statute Law Revision Act 1870 (33 & 34 Vict. c. 69))
Advance of Unclaimed Dividends, etc. Act 1808 (repealed)	48 Geo. 3. c. 4	27 February 1808
An Act to authorize the advancing, for the publick Service, upon certain Conditions, a Proportion of the Balance remaining in the Bank of England for Payment of Unclaimed Dividends, Annuities, and Lottery Prizes; and for regulating the Allowances to be paid for the Management of the National Debt. (Repealed by Bank of England Act 1861 (24 & 25 Vict. c. 3))
Benefices Act 1808 (repealed)	48 Geo. 3. c. 5	27 February 1808
An Act for repealing an Act made in the Forty-seventh Year of His present Majesty, intituled. "An Act for suspending the Operation of an Act of the Thirty-sixth Year of His present Majesty, (Note: Curates, etc. Act 1796 (36 Geo. 3. c. 83)) for the further Support and Maintenance of Curates within the Church of England, and for other Purposes in the said Ac mentioned, so far as relates to the Avoidance of Benefices by the Incumbents thereof having accepted augmented Curacies." (Note: Benefices Act 1807 (47 Geo. 3 Sess. 2. c. 75)) (Repealed by Statute Law Revision Act 1872 (No. 2) (35 & 36 Vict. c. 97))
Treaty of Commerce, etc., with America Act 1808 (repealed)	48 Geo. 3. c. 6	27 February 1808
An Act to continue, until the End of this Session of Parliament, several Acts for carrying into Execution the Treaty of Amity, Commerce, and Navigation, (Note: The 'Treaty of Amity, Commerce, and Navigation' was the Jay Treaty.) between His Majesty and the United States of America. (Repealed by Statute Law Revision Act 1872 (No. 2) (35 & 36 Vict. c. 97))
Exchequer Bills Act 1808 (repealed)	48 Geo. 3. c. 7	11 March 1808
An Act for raising the Sum of Ten Millions five hundred thousand Pounds, by Exchequer Bills, for the Service of Great Britain for the Year One thousand eight hundred and eight. (Repealed by Statute Law Revision Act 1872 (No. 2) (35 & 36 Vict. c. 97))
Treasurer of the Navy Act 1808 (repealed)	48 Geo. 3. c. 8	11 March 1808
An Act to amend an Act of the Twenty-fifth Year of His present Majesty, (Note: Treasurer of the Navy Act 1785 (25 Geo. 3. c. 31)) for better regulating the Office of the Treasurer of His Majesty's Navy. (Repealed by Treasurer of the Navy Act 1830 (11 Geo. 4 & 1 Will. 4. c. 42))
Customs Act 1808 (repealed)	48 Geo. 3. c. 9	11 March 1808
An Act for abolishing the Office of Surveyor of Subsidies and Petty Customs in the Port of London. (Repealed by Statute Law Revision Act 1861 (24 & 25 Vict. c. 101))
Distillation of Spirits (Scotland) Act 1808 (repealed)	48 Geo. 3. c. 10	11 March 1808
An Act to amend so much of an Act, made in the Forty-sixth Year of His present Majesty, (Note: Duties on Stills, etc. (Scotland) Act 1806 (46 Geo. 3. c. 102)) for granting certain Duties on Spirits made in Scotland, as relates to delivering up the Licences granted for distilling Spirits in the Lowlands of Scotland, and for better preventing private Distillation. (Repealed by Statute Law Revision Act 1872 (No. 2) (35 & 36 Vict. c. 97))
Importation Act 1808 (repealed)	48 Geo. 3. c. 11	11 March 1808
An Act for permitting the Importation of Goods from the Portuguese, Territories on the Continent of South America, in Portuguese ships. (Repealed by Customs Law Repeal Act 1825 (6 Geo. 4. c. 105))
Bounties on Sugar Act 1808 (repealed)	48 Geo. 3. c. 12	21 March 1808
An Act to amend and continue, until the Twenty-fifth Day of March One thousand eight hundred and nine, so much of an Act of the Forty-seventh Year of His present Majesty (Note: Bounties on Sugar Act 1807 (47 Geo. 3 Sess. 1. c. 22)) as allows certain Bounties on British Plantation Raw Sugar exported. (Repealed by Customs Law Repeal Act 1825 (6 Geo. 4. c. 105))
Annuity to Viscount Lake, etc. Act 1808 (repealed)	48 Geo. 3. c. 13	21 March 1808
An Act for settling and securing a certain Annuity on Viscount Lake, and the two next Persons to whom the Title of Viscount Lake shall descend, in consideration of the eminent Services of the late General Viscount Lake. (Repealed by Statute Law Revision Act 1872 (No. 2) (35 & 36 Vict. c. 97))
Marine Mutiny Act 1808 (repealed)	48 Geo. 3. c. 14	21 March 1808
An Act for the Regulation of His Majesty's Royal Marine Forces while on Shore. (Repealed by Statute Law Revision Act 1872 (No. 2) (35 & 36 Vict. c. 97))
Mutiny Act 1808 (repealed)	48 Geo. 3. c. 15	21 March 1808
An Act for punishing Mutiny and Desertion; and for the better Payment of the Army and their Quarters. (Repealed by Statute Law Revision Act 1872 (No. 2) (35 & 36 Vict. c. 97))
Bounties and Drawbacks Act 1808 (repealed)	48 Geo. 3. c. 16	21 March 1808
An Act for further continuing, until the Twenty-fifth Day of March One thousand eight hundred and nine, certain Bounties and Drawbacks on the Exportation of Sugar from Great Britain; and for suspending the Countervailing Duties and Bounties on Sugar when the Duties imposed by an Act of the last Session of Parliament (Note: Bounties (Great Britain) Act 1807 (47 Geo. 3 Sess. 1. c. 29)) shall be suspended. (Repealed by Statute Law Revision Act 1872 (No. 2) (35 & 36 Vict. c. 97))
Bounties and Drawbacks (No. 2) Act 1808 (repealed)	48 Geo. 3. c. 17	21 March 1808
An Act to continue, until the Twenty-fifth day of March One thousand eight hundred and nine, certain Acts for regulating the Drawbacks and Bounties on the Exportation of Sugar from Ireland, and allowing British Plantation Sugar to be warehoused in Ireland; and for warehousing in Ireland Rum or Spirits of the British Sugar Plantations. (Repealed by Statute Law Revision Act 1872 (No. 2) (35 & 36 Vict. c. 97))
Duties on Cinnamon, etc. Act 1808 (repealed)	48 Geo. 3. c. 18	21 March 1808
An Act for amending and further continuing an Act made in the Thirty-eighth Year of His present Majesty, (Note: Duties on Cinnamon, etc. Act 1798 (38 Geo. 3. c. 68)) for regulating the Payment of the Duties on Cinnamon, Cloves, Nutmegs, and Mace. (Repealed by Statute Law Revision Act 1872 (No. 2) (35 & 36 Vict. c. 97))
Importation (No. 2) Act 1808 (repealed)	48 Geo. 3. c. 19	21 March 1808
An Act to continue, until the Twenty-fifth Day of March One thousand eight hundred and ten, an Act made in the Forty-sixth Tear of His present Majesty, (Note: Importation (No. 4) Act 1806 (46 Geo. 3. c. 117)) for permitting the Importation of Masts, Yards, Bowsprits, and Timber, for Naval Purposes, from the British Colonics in North America, Duty-free. (Repealed by Statute Law Revision Act 1872 (No. 2) (35 & 36 Vict. c. 97))
Greenland Whale Fisheries, etc. Act 1808 (repealed)	48 Geo. 3. c. 20	21 March 1808
An Act to continue until the Twenty-fifth Day of March One thousand eight hundred and ten, several Laws relating to the Encouragement of the Greenland Whale Fisheries; to the Admission to Entry in Great Britain of Oil and Blubber of Newfoundland taken by His Majesty's Subjects carrying on the Fishery from and residing in the said Island; and to the allowing the Importation of Fish from Newfoundland and the Coast of Labrador. (Repealed by Statute Law Revision Act 1872 (No. 2) (35 & 36 Vict. c. 97))
Investment of Certain Money Act 1808 (repealed)	48 Geo. 3. c. 21	21 March 1808
An Act to empower the Commissioners appointed for distributing the Money paid by the United States of America, to withdraw the same from the Bank, and invest it in Exchequer Bills. (Repealed by Statute Law Revision Act 1872 (No. 2) (35 & 36 Vict. c. 97))
Exportation, etc. Act 1808 (repealed)	48 Geo. 3. c. 22	21 March 1808
An Act for making perpetual several Laws relating to permitting the Exportation of Tobacco Pipe Clay from Great Britain to the British Sugar Colonies in the West Indies; the Importation of Salt from Europe into Quebec in America; and the prohibiting of Foreign-wrought Silks and Velvets. (Repealed by Customs Law Repeal Act 1825 (6 Geo. 4. c. 105))
Importation (No. 3) Act 1808 (repealed)	48 Geo. 3. c. 23	21 March 1808
An Act to continue several Laws relating to the granting a Bounty on the Importation into Great Britain of Hemp, and rough and undressed Flax, from His Majesty's Colonies in America; and to the more effectually encouraging the Manufacture of Flax and Cotton in Great Britain until the Twenty-fifth Day of March One thousand eight hundred and ten; and for granting a Bounty upon certain Species of British and Irish Linens exported from Great Britain; and taking off the Duties on Importation into Great Britain, of Foreign Raw Linen Yarns made of Flax, until the Twenty-fifth Day of March One thousand eight hundred and eleven. (Repealed by Statute Law Revision Act 1872 (No. 2) (35 & 36 Vict. c. 97))
Importation (No. 4) Act 1808 (repealed)	48 Geo. 3. c. 24	21 March 1808
An Act for further continuing, until Three Months after the Ratification of a Definitive Treaty of Peace, an Act made in the Forty-fourth Year of His present Majesty, (Note: Importation Act 1804 (44 Geo. 3. c. 29)) for permitting the Importation into Great Britain, of Hides and other Articles in Foreign Ships. (Repealed by Statute Law Revision Act 1872 (No. 2) (35 & 36 Vict. c. 97))
Payment of Creditors (Scotland) Act 1808 (repealed)	48 Geo. 3. c. 25	21 March 1808
An Act for further continuing, until the Twenty-fifth Day of July One thousand eight hundred and nine, an Act made in the Thirty-third Year of His present Majesty, (Note: Payment of Creditors (Scotland) Act 1793 (33 Geo. 3. c. 74)) for rendering the Payment of Creditors more equal and expeditious in Scotland. (Repealed by Statute Law Revision Act 1872 (No. 2) (35 & 36 Vict. c. 97))
Customs (No. 2) Act 1808 (repealed)	48 Geo. 3. c. 26	28 March 1808
An Act for granting to His Majesty, until the End of the next Session of Parliament, Duties of Customs on the Goods, Wares, and Merchandize therein enumerated, in furtherance of the Provisions of certain Orders in Council. (Repealed by Statute Law Revision Act 1872 (No. 2) (35 & 36 Vict. c. 97))
Exportation and Importation Act 1808 (repealed)	48 Geo. 3. c. 27	28 March 1808
An Act to continue, until the Twenty-fifth Day of March One thousand eight hundred and nine, an Act of the Forty-first Year of His present Majesty, (Note: Exportation, etc. Act 1801 (41 Geo. 3. (U.K.). c. 36)) for prohibiting the Exportation from Ireland, and for permitting the Importation into Ireland, Duty free, of Corn and other Provisions. (Repealed by Statute Law Revision Act 1872 (No. 2) (35 & 36 Vict. c. 97))
Customs (No. 3) Act 1808 (repealed)	48 Geo. 3. c. 28	14 April 1808
An Act for granting to His Majesty, until the End of the next Session of Parliament, certain Duties on the Exportation from Ireland of Goods, Wares, and Merchandize therein enumerated. (Repealed by Statute Law Revision Act 1872 (No. 2) (35 & 36 Vict. c. 97))
Exportation Act 1808 (repealed)	48 Geo. 3. c. 29	14 April 1808
An Act to prohibit, until the End of the next Session of Parliament, the Exportation of Jesuits Bark (Note: Jesuit's bark contains quinine, which was used to treat malaria.) and Cotton Wool from Ireland. (Repealed by Statute Law Revision Act 1872 (No. 2) (35 & 36 Vict. c. 97))
Trade between Ireland and East Indies Act 1808 (repealed)	48 Geo. 3. c. 30	14 April 1808
An Act to amend an Act made in the Parliament of Ireland, in the Thirty-third Year of His present Majesty, (Note: Trade between Ireland and East Indies Act 1793 (33 Geo. 3. c. 31 (I))) for regulating the Trade of Ireland to and from the East Indies. (Repealed by Statute Law Revision Act 1861 (24 & 25 Vict. c. 101))
Counterfeiting of Tokens, etc. Act 1808 (repealed)	48 Geo. 3. c. 31	14 April 1808
An Act to extend the Provisions of an Act, made in the Forty-firth Year of His present Majesty's Reign, (Note: Counterfeiting Bank of Ireland Silver Tokens, etc. Act 1805 (45 Geo. 3. c. 42)) for preventing the counterfeiting of certain Silver Tokens to certain other Tokens which may be issued by the Governor and Company of the Bank of Ireland, and to promote the Circulation of the said last-mentioned Tokens. (Repealed by Statute Law Revision Act 1861 (24 & 25 Vict. c. 101))
Bonding Warehouses (Ireland) Act 1808 (repealed)	48 Geo. 3. c. 32	14 April 1808
An Act to permit certain Goods imported into Ireland to be warehoused or secured, without the Duties due on the Importation thereof being first paid. (Repealed by Warehousing of Goods Act 1823 (4 Geo. 4. c. 24))
Exportation (No. 2) Act 1808 (repealed)	48 Geo. 3. c. 33	14 April 1808
An Act to prohibit, until the End of the next Session of Parliament, the Exportation of Jesuits' Bark from Great Britain. (Repealed by Statute Law Revision Act 1872 (No. 2) (35 & 36 Vict. c. 97))
Exportation (No. 3) Act 1808 (repealed)	48 Geo. 3. c. 34	14 April 1808
An Act to prohibit, until the End of the next Session of Parliament, the Exportation of Cotton Wool from Great Britain. (Repealed by Statute Law Revision Act 1872 (No. 2) (35 & 36 Vict. c. 97))
Exportation (No. 4) Act 1808 (repealed)	48 Geo. 3. c. 35	14 April 1808
An Act for imposing, until the End of the next Session of Parliament, a Duty on Cotton Wool, the Growth of the British Colonies, exported from Great Britain. (Repealed by Statute Law Revision Act 1872 (No. 2) (35 & 36 Vict. c. 97))
Malt Duties Act 1808 (repealed)	48 Geo. 3. c. 36	14 April 1808
An Act for further continuing, until the Twenty-fourth Day of June One thousand eight hundred and nine, an Act of the Forty-sixth Year of His present Majesty, (Note: Malt Duties (No. 2) Act 1806 (46 Geo. 3. c. 139)) for altering and amending several Laws relating to the Duties of Excise upon Malt. (Repealed by Statute Law Revision Act 1872 (No. 2) (35 & 36 Vict. c. 97))
Validity of Certain Orders in Council, etc. Act 1808 (repealed)	48 Geo. 3. c. 37	14 April 1808
An Act for making valid certain Orders in Council, and Warrants of the Commissioners of the Treasury, for the Entry and Warehousing of certain Goods imported in Neutral Vessels, and for indemnifying all Persons concerned therein; for the remitting of Forfeitures in certain Cases; and for enabling His Majesty to allow, during the Continuance of Hostilities, and until Two Months after the Commencement of the next Session of Parliament, the Importation of Goods from Countries from which the British Flag is excluded, in any Vessels whatever. (Repealed by Statute Law Revision Act 1872 (No. 2) (35 & 36 Vict. c. 97))
National Debt Act 1808 (repealed)	48 Geo. 3. c. 38	14 April 1808
An Act for granting Annuities to satisfy certain Exchequer Bills. (Repealed by Statute Law Revision Act 1870 (33 & 34 Vict. c. 69))
Quartering of Soldiers Act 1808 (repealed)	48 Geo. 3. c. 39	14 April 1808
An Act for increasing the Rates of Subsistence to be paid to Innkeepers and others on quartering Soldiers. (Repealed by Statute Law Revision Act 1872 (No. 2) (35 & 36 Vict. c. 97))
Indemnity Act 1808 (repealed)	48 Geo. 3. c. 40	14 April 1808
An Act to indemnify such Persons in the United Kingdom as have omitted to qualify themselves for Offices and Employments; and for extending the Times limited for those Purposes respectively, until the Twenty-fifth Day of March One thousand eight hundred and nine, and to permit such Persons in Great Britain as have omitted to make and file Affidavits of the Execution of Indentures of Clerks to Attornies and Solicitors, to make and file the same on or before the First Day of Hilary Term One thousand eight hundred and nine. (Repealed by Promissory Oaths Act 1871 (34 & 35 Vict. c. 48))
Excise and Stamps Act 1808 (repealed)	48 Geo. 3. c. 41	27 May 1808
An Act to repeal certain Duties of Excise in Ireland, and to grant certain Stamp Duties in lieu thereof; and also certain other Stamp Duties; and to amend the Laws relating to the Stamp Duties in Ireland. (Repealed by Statute Law Revision Act 1861 (24 & 25 Vict. c. 101))
Assessed Taxes (Ireland) Act 1808 (repealed)	48 Geo. 3. c. 42	27 May 1808
An Act to grant to His Majesty certain Duties and Taxes in Ireland, in respect of Carriages, Dogs, Fire Hearths, Horses, Male Servants, and Windows, in lieu of former Duties and Taxes, in respect of the like Articles. (Repealed by Assessed Taxes, etc. (Ireland) Act 1816 (56 Geo. 3. c. 57))
Drawbacks Act 1808 (repealed)	48 Geo. 3. c. 43	27 May 1808
An Act to suspend, until the Eleventh Day of June One thousand, eight hundred and eight, the Payment of all Drawbacks on Spirits made or distilled in Great Britain or Ireland, and exported from either Country to the other respectively. (Repealed by Statute Law Revision Act 1872 (No. 2) (35 & 36 Vict. c. 97))
Exportation Act 1808 (repealed)	48 Geo. 3. c. 44	27 May 1808
An Act to prevent the Exportation of Wool to Ireland before Bond given for the due landing thereof. (Repealed by Customs Law Repeal Act 1825 (6 Geo. 4. c. 105))
Militia Pay (Ireland) Act 1808 (repealed)	48 Geo. 3. c. 45	27 May 1808
An Act for defraying, until the Twenty-fifth Day of March One thousand eight hundred and nine, the Charge of the Pay and Cloathing of the Militia of Ireland; for holding Courts Martial on Serjeant-Majors, Serjeants, Corporals, and Drummers, for Offences committed during the Time such Militia shall not be embodied; and for making Allowances in certain Cases to Subaltern Officers of the said Militia during Peace. (Repealed by Statute Law Revision Act 1872 (No. 2) (35 & 36 Vict. c. 97))
Militia Pay (Great Britain) Act 1808 (repealed)	48 Geo. 3. c. 46	27 May 1808
An Act for defraying the Charge of the Pay and Cloathing of the Militia in Great Britain for the Year One thousand eight hundred and eight. (Repealed by Statute Law Revision Act 1872 (No. 2) (35 & 36 Vict. c. 97))
Crown Claims Limitation (Ireland) Act 1808 (repealed)	48 Geo. 3. c. 47	27 May 1808
An Act for quieting Possessions and confirming defective Titles in Ireland, and limiting the Right of the Crown to sue in Manner therein mentioned; and for the Relief of Incumbents in respect of Arrears due to the Crown daring the Incumbency of their Predecessors. (Repealed by Statute of Limitations Act (Northern Ireland) 1958 (1958 c. 10 (N.I.)))
Dublin General Post Office Act 1808 (repealed)	48 Geo. 3. c. 48	27 May 1808
An Act to enable His Majesty's Post-Master-General of Ireland to purchase Premises for the Enlargement of the General Post Office in the City of Dublin. (Repealed by Statute Law (Repeals) Act 2013 (c. 2))
Accounts of Paymaster General Act 1808 (repealed)	48 Geo. 3. c. 49	27 May 1808
An Act for accelerating the making up, Examination, and Audit, of the Accounts of the Paymaster General of His Majesty's Forces. (Repealed by Statute Law Revision Act 1872 (No. 2) (35 & 36 Vict. c. 97))
Grants of Offices in Reversion, etc. Act 1808 (repealed)	48 Geo. 3. c. 50	27 May 1808
An Act to suspend the granting of Offices in Reversion, or for joint Lives with Benefit of Survivorship, for One Year after the passing of this Act, and from thence until Six Weeks after the Commencement of the then next Session of Parliament. (Repealed by Statute Law Revision Act 1872 (No. 2) (35 & 36 Vict. c. 97))
Militia Allowances Act 1808 (repealed)	48 Geo. 3. c. 51	27 May 1808
An Act for making Allowances in certain Cases to Subaltern Officers of the Militia in Great Britain, while disembodied. (Repealed by Statute Law Revision Act 1872 (No. 2) (35 & 36 Vict. c. 97))
Militia Allowances (No. 2) Act 1808 (repealed)	48 Geo. 3. c. 52	27 May 1808
An Act to revive and continue, until the Twenty-fifth Day of March One thousand eight hundred and nine, and amend so much of an Act, made in the Thirty-ninth and Fortieth Years of His present Majesty, (Note: Militia Allowances Act 1800 (39 & 40 Geo. 3. c. 44)) as grants certain Allowances to Adjutants and Serjeant Majors of the Militia of England, disembodied under an Act (Note: Militia Act 1799 (39 & 40 Geo. 3. c. 1)) of the same Session of Parliament. (Repealed by Statute Law Revision Act 1872 (No. 2) (35 & 36 Vict. c. 97))
Exchequer Bills (No. 2) Act 1808 (repealed)	48 Geo. 3. c. 53	27 May 1808
An Act for raising the Sum of Three Millions by Exchequer Bills, for the Service of Great Britain for the Year One thousand eight hundred and eight. (Repealed by Statute Law Revision Act 1872 (No. 2) (35 & 36 Vict. c. 97))
Exchequer Bills (No. 3) Act 1808 (repealed)	48 Geo. 3. c. 54	27 May 1808
An Act for raising the Sum of One Million five hundred thousand Pounds, by Exchequer Bills» for the Service of Great Britain for the Year One thousand eight hundred and eight. (Repealed by Statute Law Revision Act 1872 (No. 2) (35 & 36 Vict. c. 97))
House Tax Act 1808 (repealed)	48 Geo. 3. c. 55	1 June 1808
An Act for repealing the Duties of Assessed Taxes, and granting new Duties in lieu thereof, and certain additional Duties to be consolidated therewith; and also for repealing the Stamp Duties on Game Certificates, and granting new Duties in lieu thereof, to be placed under the Management of the Commissioners for the Affairs of Taxes. (Repealed by Finance Act 1924)
Customs (No. 4) Act 1808 (repealed)	48 Geo. 3. c. 56	1 June 1808
An Act for abolishing Fees received by Officers in the Service of the Customs in the several Ports of Ireland, and for regulating the Hours of Attendance and the Number of Holidays to be observed by the said Officers and certain Officers of Excise. (Repealed by Statute Law Revision Act 1861 (24 & 25 Vict. c. 101))
Customs (No. 5) Act 1808 (repealed)	48 Geo. 3. c. 57	1 June 1808
An Act for increasing the Duty on Corks ready-made, imported into Great Britain. (Repealed by Statute Law Revision Act 1861 (24 & 25 Vict. c. 101))
Bail Bonds Act 1808 (repealed)	48 Geo. 3. c. 58	1 June 1808
An Act for amending the Law with regard to the Course of Proceeding on Indictments and Informations in the Court of King's Bench in certain Cases; for authorizing the Execution in Scotland of certain Warrants issued for Offences committed in England; and for requiring Officers taking Bail in the King's Suit to assign the Bail Bonds to the King. (Repealed by Administration of Justice (Miscellaneous Provisions) Act 1938 (c. 63))
Annuity to Duchess of Brunswick Wolfenbuttel Act 1808 (repealed)	48 Geo. 3. c. 59	1 June 1808
An Act for enabling His Majesty to settle an Annuity on Her Royal Highness the Duchess of Brunswick Wolfenbuttel. (Repealed by Statute Law Revision Act 1872 (No. 2) (35 & 36 Vict. c. 97))
Tanners, Curriers, Shoemakers, etc. Act 1808 (repealed)	48 Geo. 3. c. 60	1 June 1808
An Act for repealing an Act passed in the First Year of King James the First, intituled, "An Act concerning Tanners, Curriers, Shoemakers, and other Artificers occupying the cutting of Leather;" (Note: Leather Act 1603 (1 Jas. 1. c. 22)) and also for repealing and amending certain Parts of several other Acts of Parliament relating thereto. (Repealed by Statute Law Revision Act 1872 (No. 2) (35 & 36 Vict. c. 97))
Inquiry into Military Departments Act 1808 (repealed)	48 Geo. 3. c. 61	3 June 1808
An Act to continue, until the End of the next Session of Parliament, an Act of the Forty-fifth Year of His present Majesty, for appointing Commissioners to enquire into the publick Expenditure and the Conduct of the publick Business in the Military Departments therein mentioned. (Repealed by Statute Law Revision Act 1872 (No. 2) (35 & 36 Vict. c. 97))
Customs and Excise (Ireland) Act 1808 (repealed)	48 Geo. 3. c. 62	18 June 1808
An Act for the making perpetual several Acts for the better Collection and Security of the Revenues of Customs and Excise in Ireland, and for preventing Frauds therein; and to make further Provision for the Security of the said Revenues, and for the Execution of the several Acts relating thereto. (Repealed by Statute Law Revision Act 1861 (24 & 25 Vict. c. 101))
Duties on Auctions (Ireland) Act 1808 (repealed)	48 Geo. 3. c. 63	18 June 1808
An Act to amend an Act made in the Forty-seventh Year of His present Majesty's Reign (Note: Auction Duties (Ireland) Act 1807 (47 Geo. 3 Sess. 1. c. 17)) for securing the Collection of the Duties on Auctions in Ireland. (Repealed by Auction Duties (Ireland) Act 1814 (54 Geo. 3. c. 82))
Militia (Ireland) Act 1808 (repealed)	48 Geo. 3. c. 64	18 June 1808
An Act to amend an Act made in the Forty-sixth Year of His present Majesty, (Note: Irish Militia Act 1806 (46 Geo. 3. c. 124)) for enabling His Majesty to accept the Services of Volunteers from the Militia of Ireland. (Repealed by Statute Law Revision Act 1861 (24 & 25 Vict. c. 101))
Church Building, etc. (Ireland) Act 1808 (repealed)	48 Geo. 3. c. 65	18 June 1808
An Act to make more effectual Provision for the Building and Rebuilding of Churches, Chapels, and Glebe Houses, and for the Purchase of Glebe Lands, Glebe Houses, and Impropriations, in Ireland. (Repealed by Church Temporalities (Ireland) Act 1833 (3 & 4 Will. 4. c. 37))
Benefices (Ireland) Act 1808 (repealed)	48 Geo. 3. c. 66	18 June 1808
An Act for enforcing the Residence of Spiritual Persons on their Benefices in Ireland. (Repealed by Church of Ireland Act 1824 (5 Geo. 4. c. 91))
Customs (No. 6) Act 1808 (repealed)	48 Geo. 3. c. 67	18 June 1808
An Act for granting an additional Duty on Copper imported into Great Britain, until the Fifth Day of April One thousand eight hundred and eleven, and from thence to the End of the then next Session of Parliament. (Repealed by Statute Law Revision Act 1872 (No. 2) (35 & 36 Vict. c. 97))
Bounty on Pilchards Act 1808 (repealed)	48 Geo. 3. c. 68	18 June 1808
An Act for extending the Bounty now payable on Pilchards exported to the West Indies or Mediterranean to Pilchards exported to any Parts beyond the Seas. (Repealed by Statute Law Revision Act 1861 (24 & 25 Vict. c. 101))
Exportation Act 1808 (repealed)	48 Geo. 3. c. 69	18 June 1808
An Act to permit, until the Twenty-fifth Day of March One thousand eight hundred and ten, Sugar and Coffee to be exported from His Majesty's Colonies or Plantations to any Port in Europe to the Southward of Cape Finisterre, and Corn to be imported from such Port and from the Coast of Africa into the said Colonies and Plantations. (Repealed by Statute Law Revision Act 1872 (No. 2) (35 & 36 Vict. c. 97))
British Ships Captured by the Enemy Act 1808 (repealed)	48 Geo. 3. c. 70	18 June 1808
An Act to provide that British Ships which shall be captured by the Enemy, and shall afterwards become the Property of British Subjects, shall not be entitled to the Privilege of British Ships. (Repealed by Registering of Vessels Act 1823 (4 Geo. 4. c. 41))
Amendment of cc 26, 28 of this Session Act 1808 (repealed)	48 Geo. 3. c. 71	18 June 1808
An Act to amend so much of Two Acts of this Session of Parliament, (Note: Customs (No. 2) Act 1808 (48 Geo. 3. c. 26)) (Note: Customs (No. 3) Act 1808 (48 Geo. 3. c. 28)) for carrying into Execution certain Orders in Council, as relates to the Duties on Goods exported from the Warehouses in which they have been secured on Importation, and on certain Prize Goods imported into Great Britain or Ireland. (Repealed by Statute Law Revision Act 1872 (No. 2) (35 & 36 Vict. c. 97))
Dean and New Forests Act 1808 or the Dean Forest (Timber) Act 1808	48 Geo. 3. c. 72	18 June 1808
An Act for the Increase and Preservation of Timber in Dean and New Forests.
Duchy of Lancaster Act 1808	48 Geo. 3. c. 73	18 June 1808
An Act to improve the Land Revenue of the Crown in England, and also of His Majesty’s Duchy of Lancaster.
Malt Duties (No. 2) Act 1808 (repealed)	48 Geo. 3. c. 74	18 June 1808
An Act for the better Collection of the Duties on Malt made in Great Britain. (Repealed by Statute Law Revision Act 1861 (24 & 25 Vict. c. 101))
Burial of Drowned Persons Act 1808 or Grylls' Act (repealed)	48 Geo. 3. c. 75	18 June 1808
An Act for providing suitable Interment in Church-yards or Parochial Burying Grounds in England, for such dead Human Bodies as may be cast on Shore from the Sea, in Cases of Wreck or otherwise. (Repealed by National Assistance Act 1948 (11 & 12 Geo. 6. c. 29))
National Debt (No. 2) Act 1808 (repealed)	48 Geo. 3. c. 76	18 June 1808
An Act for raising the Sum of Ten Millions Five hundred thousand Pounds by way of Annuities. (Repealed by Statute Law Revision Act 1870 (33 & 34 Vict. c. 69))
Londonderry School Act 1808 (repealed)	48 Geo. 3. c. 77	18 June 1808
An Act to enable His Majesty to vest the Right of Appointment of Master of the Free School of Londonderry in the City and County of Londonderry, in the Bishop of Derry for the Time being. (Repealed by Foyle College Act 1874 (37 & 38 Vict. c. 79))
Malt, etc., Duties (Ireland) Act 1808 (repealed)	48 Geo. 3. c. 78	23 June 1808
An Act to grant to His Majesty Duties upon Malt made in Ireland, and upon Spirits made or distilled in Ireland; and to allow certain Drawbacks on the Exportation thereof. (Repealed by Statute Law Revision Act 1861 (24 & 25 Vict. c. 101))
Malt Duties (Ireland) Act 1808 (repealed)	48 Geo. 3. c. 79	23 June 1808
An Act to amend the Two Acts for the collecting of the Malt Duties in Ireland, and regulating the Trade of a Maltster. (Repealed by Statute Law Revision Act 1872 (No. 2) (35 & 36 Vict. c. 97))
Customs (Ireland) Act 1808 (repealed)	48 Geo. 3. c. 80	23 June 1808
An Act to continue until the Fifth Day of July One thousand eight hundred and nine, and to amend several Acts for granting certain Rates and Duties, and for allowing certain Drawbacks and Bounties on Goods, Wares, and Merchandize imported into and exported from Ireland; and to grant new Duties on the Importation of East India Sugar and Foreign Spirits; and to reduce the Duty on British Plantation Coffee imported. (Repealed by Statute Law Revision Act 1872 (No. 2) (35 & 36 Vict. c. 97))
Duties on Spirits (Ireland) Act 1808 (repealed)	48 Geo. 3. c. 81	23 June 1808
An Act to amend the several Acts for the regulating and securing the Collection of the Duty on Spirits distilled in Ireland. (Repealed by Illicit Distillation (Ireland) Act 1831 (1 & 2 Will. 4. c. 55))
Excise (Ireland) Act 1808 (repealed)	48 Geo. 3. c. 82	23 June 1808
An Act to make perpetual and to amend several Acts for the better regulating the issuing and granting of Permits and Certificates, for the Conveyance and Protection of certain Exciseable Goods in Ireland. (Repealed by Permits, etc. (Ireland) Act 1819 (59 Geo. 3. c. 107))
National Debt (No. 3) Act 1808 (repealed)	48 Geo. 3. c. 83	23 June 1808
An Act for raising the Sum of Seven hundred and fifty thousand Pounds by way of Annuities for the Service of Ireland. (Repealed by Statute Law Revision Act 1870 (33 & 34 Vict. c. 69))
Smuggling, etc. Act 1808 or the Smuggling Act 1808 (repealed)	48 Geo. 3. c. 84	23 June 1808
An Act for amending and rendering more effectual an Act, passed in the last Session of Parliament, (Note: Smuggling Act 1807 (47 Geo. 3 Sess. 2. c. 66)) to make more effectual Provision for the Prevention of Smuggling; and for regulating the Periods for cancelling and delivering up certain Bonds relating to the Revenue of Customs. (Repealed by Customs Law Repeal Act 1825 (6 Geo. 4. c. 105))
Trade with America Act 1808 (repealed)	48 Geo. 3. c. 85	23 June 1808
An Act to regulate the Trade between Great Britain and the United States of America until the End of the next Session of Parliament. (Repealed by Statute Law Revision Act 1872 (No. 2) (35 & 36 Vict. c. 97))
British Fisheries Act 1808 (repealed)	48 Geo. 3. c. 86	23 June 1808
An Act to revive and continue until the Twenty-fifth Day of March One thousand eight hundred and nine, an Act of the Thirty-ninth Year of His present Majesty, (Note: British Fisheries Society Act 1799 (39 Geo. 3. c. 100)) for the more effectual Encouragement of the British Fisheries. (Repealed by Sea Fisheries Act 1868 (31 & 32 Vict. c. 45))
Hackney Coach Fares Act 1808 (repealed)	48 Geo. 3. c. 87	23 June 1808
An Act for repealing the Rates and Taxes taken by licensed Hackney Coachmen, and for establishing others in lieu thereof; and for amending several Laws relating to Hackney Coaches. (Repealed by Hackney Carriages Act 1815 (55 Geo. 3. c. 159) and London Hackney Carriage Act 1831 (1 & 2 Will. 4. c. 22))
Bill of Exchange Act 1808 (repealed)	48 Geo. 3. c. 88	23 June 1808
An Act to restrain the Negotiation of Promissory Notes and Inland Bills of Exchange, under a limited Sum in England. (Repealed by Bills of Exchange Act 1882 (45 & 46 Vict. c. 61))
Accounts of Barrack Office Act 1808 (repealed)	48 Geo. 3. c. 89	23 June 1808
An Act for enabling the Commissioners appointed to examine Accounts of Publick Expenditure in the Barrack Office, more speedily and effectually to investigate the said Accounts. (Repealed by Statute Law Revision Act 1872 (No. 2) (35 & 36 Vict. c. 97))
Postage Act 1808 (repealed)	48 Geo. 3. c. 90	23 June 1808
An Act to enable the Commissioners for auditing Publick Accounts, and the Commissioners for the Affairs of Barracks, respectively, to send and receive Letters and Packets on the Business of their Offices free of Postage. (Repealed by Post Office (Repeal of Laws) Act 1837 (7 Will. 4 & 1 Vict. c. 32))
Accounts of Expenditure in West Indies Act 1808 (repealed)	48 Geo. 3. c. 91	23 June 1808
An Act for enabling the Commissioners appointed to examine Accounts of Publick Expenditures in the West Indies, more speedily and effectually to investigate the said Accounts. (Repealed by Statute Law Revision Act 1861 (24 & 25 Vict. c. 101))
Management of Stock Redeemed Act 1808 (repealed)	48 Geo. 3. c. 92	23 June 1808
An Act to repeal so much of an Act, made in the Forty-seventh Year of His present Majesty, (Note: Charge of Loan Act 1807 (47 Geo. 3 Sess. 1. c. 55)) for charging the Sum of Twelve Millions two hundred thousand Pounds, raised for the Service of Great Britain for the Year One thousand eight hundred and seven, upon the Duties of Customs and Excise granted to His Majesty, during the Continuance of the present War, as relates to Money issued for Charges of Management of Stock redeemed. (Repealed by Statute Law Revision Act 1872 (No. 2) (35 & 36 Vict. c. 97))
Gamekeepers Act 1808 (repealed)	48 Geo. 3. c. 93	23 June 1808
An Act to repeal so much of an Act of the First Year of King James the First, (Note: Game Act 1603 (1 Jas. 1. c. 27)) as relates to the Penalties on Shooting at Hares; and also to repeal an Act of the Third Year of King George the First, (Note: Game Act 1716 (3 Geo. 1. c. 11)) relating to Gamekeepers. (Repealed by Game Act 1831 (1 & 2 Will. 4. c. 32))
Shooting Hares (Scotland) Act 1808 (repealed)	48 Geo. 3. c. 94	23 June 1808
An Act for repealing so much of an Act made in the Parliament of Scotland, in the Fourth Session of the First Parliament of Queen Anne, intituled, "Act for preserving the Game," (Note: Game Act 1707 (c. 91 (S))) as relates to the Shooting of Hares. (Repealed by Statute Law Revision Act 1872 (No. 2) (35 & 36 Vict. c. 97))
Bringing of Coals, etc., to London, etc. Act 1808 (repealed)	48 Geo. 3. c. 95	23 June 1808
An Act for continuing, until the First Day of August One thousand eight hundred and eleven, an Act of the Forty-fifth year of His present Majesty, (Note: Bringing of Coals, etc., to London, etc. Act 1805 (45 Geo. 3. c. 128)) for allowing, under certain Restrictions, the bringing a limited Quantity of Coals, Culm, or Cinders, to London and Westminster, by Inland Navigation. (Repealed by Customs Law Repeal Act 1825 (6 Geo. 4. c. 105))
County Asylums Act 1808 or the Lunatic Paupers or Criminals Act 1808 or Mr. Wynn's Act (repealed)	48 Geo. 3. c. 96	23 June 1808
An Act for the better Care and Maintenance of Lunaticks, being Paupers or Criminals in England. (Repealed by County Lunatic Asylums (England) Act 1828 (9 Geo. 4. c. 40))
Exchequer Bills (No. 4) Act 1808 (repealed)	48 Geo. 3. c. 97	23 June 1808
An Act to enable the Commissioners of His Majesty's Treasury, to issue Exchequer Bills, on the credit of such Aids or Supplies as have been or shall be granted by Parliament for the Service of Great Britain for the Year One thousand eight hundred and eight. (Repealed by Statute Law Revision Act 1872 (No. 2) (35 & 36 Vict. c. 97))
Post Horse Duties Act 1808 (repealed)	48 Geo. 3. c. 98	23 June 1808
An Act for letting to Farm the Duties on Horses hired by the Mile or Stage, to be used in travelling, and on Horses hired for a less Period of Time than Twenty-eight Days, for drawing Carnages used in travelling Post, or otherwise, in Great Britain, and for better securing the said Duties. (Repealed by Statute Law Revision Act 1872 (No. 2) (35 & 36 Vict. c. 97))
Prize Goods Act 1808 (repealed)	48 Geo. 3. c. 99	23 June 1808
An Act for depositing Prize Goods liable to Duty in Warehouses under the Care of the Officers of the Customs and Excise, and for reducing Spirits condemned as Prize to a proper Strength, for Home Consumption. (Repealed by Statute Law Revision Act 1861 (24 & 25 Vict. c. 101))
Prize Act 1808 (repealed)	48 Geo. 3. c. 100	23 June 1808
An Act for extending the Provisions of an Act made in the Forty-seventh Year of His present Majesty, (Note: Prize Act 1807 (47 Geo. 3 Sess. 1. c. 47)) so far as respects the Payment of Prize Money arising from Captures made by Foreign in Conjunction with British Ships, to Captures made by the Land Forces of Foreign States in Conjunction with the British. (Repealed by Naval Prize Acts Repeal Act 1864 (27 & 28 Vict. c. 23))
Exercising Ground, Chatham Act 1808	48 Geo. 3. c. 101	23 June 1808
An Act for extinguishing the Right of Way over a Lane or Road leading across the Exercising Ground in front of Chatham Lines, and for vesting the Soil thereof in His Majesty, His Heirs and Successors.
Land Tax Act 1808 (repealed)	48 Geo. 3. c. 102	23 June 1808
An Act for appointing Commissioners for carrying into Execution an Act of this Session of Parliament, (Note: Duties on Malt, etc. Act 1808 (48 Geo. 3. c. 2)) for granting to His Majesty a Duty on Pensions and Offices in England; and an Act made in the Thirty-eighth Year of His present Majesty, (Note: Land Tax Act 1797 (38 Geo. 3. c. 5)) for granting an Aid to His Majesty by a Land Tax, to be raised in Great Britain, for the Service of the Year One thousand seven hundred and ninety-eight. (Repealed by Statute Law Revision Act 1872 (No. 2) (35 & 36 Vict. c. 97))
Bank of Ireland Act 1808	48 Geo. 3. c. 103	25 June 1808
An Act for further extending the Provisions of several Acts for establishing the Bank of Ireland; and for empowering the Governor and Company of the said Bank to advance the Sum of One million two hundred and fifty thousand Pounds, Irish Currency, towards the Service of the Year One thousand eight hundred and eight.
Pilots and Pilotage Act 1808 (repealed)	48 Geo. 3. c. 104	25 June 1808
An Act for the better Regulation of Pilots, and of the Pilotage of Ships and Vessels navigating the British Seas. (Repealed by Pilotage Act 1812 (52 Geo. 3. c. 39))
Cape of Good Hope Trade Act 1808 (repealed)	48 Geo. 3. c. 105	25 June 1808
An Act to authorize His Majesty, until the Twenty-fifth Day of March One thousand eight hundred and nine, to make Regulations respecting the Trade and Commerce to and from the Cape of Good Hope. (Repealed by Statute Law Revision Act 1872 (No. 2) (35 & 36 Vict. c. 97))
Acts of Parliament (Expiration) Act 1808	48 Geo. 3. c. 106	25 June 1808
An Act to remedy the Inconvenience which has arisen and may arise from the Expiration of Acts before the passing of Acts to continue the same.
Defence of the Realm Act 1808 (repealed)	48 Geo. 3. c. 107	25 June 1808
An Act to enable the Secretary at War to enforce the making of Returns from Clerks of Subdivisions, and others, in relation to Fines, Half Bounties, and Residues of Sums due under certain Acts relating to the Defence of the Realm, for the Purpose of directing the Distribution thereof to the Persons entitled thereto. (Repealed by Statute Law Revision Act 1861 (24 & 25 Vict. c. 101))
Compensation to Patentee Officers (Ireland) Act 1808 (repealed)	48 Geo. 3. c. 108	25 June 1808
An Act for carrying into complete Execution and Effect certain Provisions contained in an Act passed in the Forty-third Year of His present Majesty, (Note: Process (Ireland) Act 1803 (43 Geo. 3. c. 53)) for making Compensation to the Patentee Officers of the Pleas Side of the Court of Exchequer in Ireland, as far as respects the Compensation to John McClintock, and William Foster McClintock, Esquires, Patentee Officers of the Office of Serjeant at Arms of the said Court of Exchequer. (Repealed by Statute Law Revision Act 1872 (No. 2) (35 & 36 Vict. c. 97))
Trade with South America Act 1808 (repealed)	48 Geo. 3. c. 109	25 June 1808
An Act to regulate the Trade between Great Britain and the Portuguese Territories, on the Continent of South America. (Repealed by Customs Law Repeal Act 1825 (6 Geo. 4. c. 105))
Herring Fishery (Scotland) Act 1808 (repealed)	48 Geo. 3. c. 110	25 June 1808
An Act for the further Encouragement and better Regulation of the British White Herring Fishery, until the First Day of June One thousand eight hundred and thirteen, and from thence to the End of the then next Session of Parliament. (Repealed by Inshore Fishing (Scotland) Act 1984 (c. 26))
Local Militia (England) Act 1808 or the Local Militia Act 1808 (repealed)	48 Geo. 3. c. 111	30 June 1808
An Act for enabling His Majesty to establish a permanent Local Militia Force, under certain Restrictions, for the Defence of the Realm. (Repealed by Local Militia (England) Act 1812 (52 Geo. 3. c. 38))
Treasury Bills (Ireland) Act 1808 (repealed)	48 Geo. 3. c. 112	30 June 1808
An Act for raising the Sum of Five hundred thousand Pounds by Treasury Bills for the Service of Ireland for the Year One thousand eight hundred and eight. (Repealed by Statute Law Revision Act 1872 (No. 2) (35 & 36 Vict. c. 97))
Disused Public Buildings (Ireland) Act 1808 (repealed)	48 Geo. 3. c. 113	30 June 1808
An Act to empower Grand Juries in Ireland (or Persons appointed by them) to sell or exchange Ground that has been occupied by old Court Houses, Gaols, or County Infirmaries, and the Materials thereon. (Repealed by Health Services Act (Northern Ireland) 1948 (c. 3 (N.I.)), Prison Act (Northern Ireland) 1953 (c. 18 (N.I.)) and Administration of Justice Act (Northern Ireland) 1954 (c. 9 (N.I.)))
Exchequer Bills (No. 5) Act 1808 (repealed)	48 Geo. 3. c. 114	30 June 1808
An Act for raising the Sum of Six Millions, by Exchequer Bills, for the Service of Great Britain for the Year One thousand eight hundred and eight. (Repealed by Statute Law Revision Act 1872 (No. 2) (35 & 36 Vict. c. 97))
Duties on Spirits Act 1808 (repealed)	48 Geo. 3. c. 115	30 June 1808
An Act to grant to His Majesty Countervailing Duties on Spirits imported into Ireland from Scotland; and to allow Equivalent Drawbacks on Spirits exported from Ireland to Scotland. (Repealed by Statute Law Revision Act 1872 (No. 2) (35 & 36 Vict. c. 97))
Postage (No. 2) Act 1808 (repealed)	48 Geo. 3. c. 116	30 June 1808
An Act for granting to His Majesty Rates of Postage on the Conveyance of Letters and Packets to and from the Island of Madeira, and to and from the Portuguese Territories on the Continent of South America. (Repealed by Post Office (Repeal of Laws) Act 1837 (7 Will. 4 & 1 Vict. c. 32))
Duties upon Silks Act 1808 (repealed)	48 Geo. 3. c. 117	30 June 1808
An Act for repealing the Duties upon Silks painted and stained, and for granting; other Duties in lieu thereof. (Repealed by Statute Law Revision Act 1861 (24 & 25 Vict. c. 101))
Distillation of Spirits Act 1808 (repealed)	48 Geo. 3. c. 118	30 June 1808
An Act to prohibit the Distillation of Spirits from Corn or Grain, for a limited Time. (Repealed by Statute Law Revision Act 1872 (No. 2) (35 & 36 Vict. c. 97))
Duties on Spirits Act 1808 (repealed)	48 Geo. 3. c. 119	30 June 1808
An Act lor regulating the charging of the Duty on Spirits imported into Great Britain, according to the Strength thereof. (Repealed by Statute Law Revision Act 1861 (24 & 25 Vict. c. 101))
Duties on Spirits and Coffee Act 1808 (repealed)	48 Geo. 3. c. 120	30 June 1808
An Act for reducing the Excise Duties on Coffee imported into Great Britain, and for directing that Coffee and Cocoa warehoused shall be subject to the Regulations of an Act of the Forty-third Year of His present Majesty, (Note: Excise Act 1803 (43 Geo. 3. c. 69)) for permitting certain Goods; imported to be secured in Warehouses. (Repealed by Statute Law Revision Act 1861 (24 & 25 Vict. c. 101))
Duties on Spirits and Coffee (No. 2) Act 1808 (repealed)	48 Geo. 3. c. 121	30 June 1808
An Act for reducing the Duty of Customs on Coffee imported into Great Britain when taken out of Warehouse for Home Consumption. (Repealed by Statute Law Revision Act 1861 (24 & 25 Vict. c. 101))
Property for Barrack Service, etc. Act 1808 (repealed)	48 Geo. 3. c. 122	30 June 1808
An Act for veiling all Estates and Property occupied for the Barrack Service in the Commissioners for the Affairs of Barracks; and for granting certain Powers to the said Commissioners. (Repealed by Statute Law Revision Act 1861 (24 & 25 Vict. c. 101))
Discharge of Certain Imprisoned Debtors Act 1808 (repealed)	48 Geo. 3. c. 123	30 June 1808
An Act for the Discharge of Debtors in Execution for Small Debts, from Imprisonment in certain Cases. (Repealed by Bankruptcy Repeal and Insolvent Court Act 1869 (32 & 33 Vict. c. 83))
Southern Whale Fisheries Act 1808 (repealed)	48 Geo. 3. c. 124	30 June 1808
An Act for continuing the Premiums allowed to Ships employed in the Southern Whale Fishery. (Repealed by Customs Law Repeal Act 1825 (6 Geo. 4. c. 105))
Importation (No. 5) Act 1808 (repealed)	48 Geo. 3. c. 125	30 June 1808
An Act to permit the Importation of Rice, Grain; and Flour, from any Foreign Colonies on the Continent of America into certain Ports in the West Indies, and to allow certain Articles to be imported from the United States of America into the British Provinces in North America, for the Purpose of Exportation to the British Islands in the West Indies. (Repealed by Trade Act 1822 (3 Geo. 4. c. 44))
Removal of Goods for Exportation, etc. Act 1808 (repealed)	48 Geo. 3. c. 126	30 June 1808
An Act to permit Goods secured in Warehouses in the Port of London to be removed to the Out-ports for Exportation to any Part of Europe, for empowering His Majesty to direct that Licences which His Majesty is authorized to grant under His Sign Manual may be granted by One of the Principal Secretaries of State; and for enabling His Majesty to permit the Exportation of Goods in Vessels of less Burthen than are now allowed by Law, during the present Hostilities, and until One Month after the Signature of the Preliminary Articles of Peace. (Repealed by Statute Law Revision Act 1872 (No. 2) (35 & 36 Vict. c. 97))
Marriages Confirmation Act 1808 (repealed)	48 Geo. 3. c. 127	30 June 1808
An Act to render valid certain Marriages solemnized in certain Churches and Publick Chapels in which Banns had not usually been published before or at the Time of passing an Act made in the Twenty-sixth Year of the Reign of His late Majesty King George the Second, intituled, "An Act for the better preventing of Clandestine Marriages." (Note: Clandestine Marriages Act 1753 (26 Geo. 2. c. 33)) (Repealed by Statute Law (Repeals) Act 1977 (c. 18))
Regimental Accounts Act 1808 (repealed)	48 Geo. 3. c. 128	30 June 1808
An Act to repeal so much of an Act, passed in the Forty-fifth Year of His present Majesty, (Note: Office of Paymaster General Act 1805 (45 Geo. 3. c. 58)) for regulating the Office of Paymaster General, as requires certain Accounts to be examined and settled within certain Periods, by the Secretary at War, and enabling His Majesty to make Orders for examining and settling such Accounts. (Repealed by Statute Law (Repeals) Act 1995 (c. 44))
Larceny Act 1808 (repealed)	48 Geo. 3. c. 129	30 June 1808
An Act to repeal so much of an Act passed in the Eighth Year of the Reign of Queen Elizabeth, intituled, "An Act to take away the Benefit of Clergy from certain Offenders for Felony," (Note: Benefit of Clergy Act 1566 (8 Eliz. 1. c. 4)) as takes away the Benefit of Clergy from Persons stealing privily from the Person of another; and for more effectually preventing the Crime of Larceny from the Person. (Repealed by Statute Law Revision Act 1861 (24 & 25 Vict. c. 101))
Frauds by Boatmen in Cinque Ports, etc. Act 1808 (repealed)	48 Geo. 3. c. 130	30 June 1808
An Act for preventing the various Frauds and Depredations committed on Merchants, Ship Owners, and Under Writers, by Boatmen and others, within the Jurisdiction of the Cinque Ports; and also for remedying certain Defects relative to the Adjustment of Salvage, under a Statute made in the Twelfth Year of the Reign of Her late Majesty Queen Anne. (Note: Stranded Ships Act 1713 (13 Ann. c. 21)) (Repealed by Merchant Shipping Repeal Act 1854 (17 & 18 Vict. c. 120))
Woollen Manufacture Act 1808 (repealed)	48 Geo. 3. c. 131	30 June 1808
An Act for further continuing until the First Day of May One thousand eight hundred and nine, an Act of the Forty-third Year of His present Majesty, (Note: Woollen Manufacture Act 1803 (43 Geo. 3. c. 136)) for suspending Proceedings in Actions and other Proceedings relating to the Woollen Manufacture. (Repealed by Statute Law Revision Act 1872 (No. 2) (35 & 36 Vict. c. 97))
Reprisals Against Foreign Ships, etc. Act 1808 (repealed)	48 Geo. 3. c. 132	30 June 1808
An Act to extend the Provisions of an Act, passed in the Forty-fifth Year of His present Majesty, (Note: Manning of the Navy Act 1805 (45 Geo. 3. c. 72)) for the Encouragement of Seamen and better manning His Majesty's Navy, to Cases arising in consequence of Hostilities commenced since the palling of the said Act. (Repealed by Naval Prize Acts Repeal Act 1864 (27 & 28 Vict. c. 23))
First Meetings of Commissioners Act 1808 (repealed)	48 Geo. 3. c. 133	30 June 1808
An Act for enlarging the Times appointed for the first Meetings of Commissioners and other Persons, for putting in Execution certain Acts of this Session of Parliament. (Repealed by Statute Law Revision Act 1872 (No. 2) (35 & 36 Vict. c. 97))
Hops Act 1808 (repealed)	48 Geo. 3. c. 134	30 June 1808
An Act to amend the Laws relating to the marking of Bags and Pockets of Hops. (Repealed by Statute Law Revision Act 1872 (No. 2) (35 & 36 Vict. c. 97))
Grenada and Saint Vincent Traders Act 1808 (repealed)	48 Geo. 3. c. 135	30 June 1808
An Act to amend an Act made in the Forty-sixth Year of His present Majesty (Note: Estates of Granada and Saint Vincent Traders Act 1806 (46 Geo. 3. c. 157)) for more effectually carrying into Execution the Purposes of an Act made in the Thirty-ninth and Fortieth Year of His Majesty, (Note: Loans to Grenada and Saint Vincent Traders Act 1799 (39 & 40 Geo. 3. c. 13)) to give further Time for the Payment, on the Conditions therein mentioned, of Instalments on certain Loans advanced to the House of Alexander Houston and Company to Charles Ashwell Esquire, and to William Johnstone Esquire, being Persons connected with and trading to the Islands of Grenada and Saint Vincent, so far as relates to the Real and Personal Estates of William Mac Dowall, James Mac Dowall, and Robert Houston Rae, in the West Indies and elsewhere, except in Scotland. (Repealed by Statute Law Revision Act 1950 (14 Geo. 6. c. 6))
Militia of Tower Hamlets Act 1808 (repealed)	48 Geo. 3. c. 136	30 June 1808
An Act to indemnify all Officers and Persons who have carried into Execution any of the Provisions of an Act passed in the last Session of Parliament, (Note: Militia (Great Britain) (No. 2) Act 1807 (47 Geo. 3 Sess. 2. c. 71)) for completing and increasing the Militia of Great Britain, in relation to the Militia of the Tower Hamlets. (Repealed by Statute Law Revision Act 1872 (No. 2) (35 & 36 Vict. c. 97))
Purchase for Houses of Parliament Act 1808	48 Geo. 3. c. 137	30 June 1808
An Act to amend and enlarge the Powers of an Act of the Forty-sixth Year of His present Majesty, (Note: Houses of Parliament Act 1806 (46 Geo. 3. c. 89)) for consolidating and rendering more effectual the several Acts for the Purchase of Buildings and further Improvement of the Streets and Places near to Westminster Hall and the Two Houses of Parliament.
Teinds Act 1808 (repealed)	48 Geo. 3. c. 138	30 June 1808
An Act for defining and regulating the Powers of the Commission of Teinds, in augmenting and modifying the Stipends of the Clergy of Scotland. (Repealed by Abolition of Feudal Tenure etc. (Scotland) Act 2000 (asp 5))
Lotteries Act 1808 (repealed)	48 Geo. 3. c. 139	30 June 1808
An Act for granting to His Majesty a Sum of Money to be raised by Lotteries. (Repealed by Statute Law Revision Act 1872 (No. 2) (35 & 36 Vict. c. 97))
Dublin Police Magistrates Act 1808 (repealed)	48 Geo. 3. c. 140	30 June 1808
An Act for the more effectual administration of the Office of a Justice of the Peace, and for the more effectual Prevention of Felonies within the District of Dublin Metropolis. (Repealed by Dublin Justices Act 1824 (5 Geo. 4. c. 102), Statute Law Revision Act 1872 (No. 2) (35 & 36 Vict. c. 97), Statute Law Revision Act 1873 (36 & 37 Vict. c. 91), Statute Law Revision Act 1887 (50 & 51 Vict. c. 59) and Statute Law (Repeals) Act 1971 (c. 52))
Assessment of Taxes Act 1808 (repealed)	48 Geo. 3. c. 141	2 July 1808
An Act to amend the Acts relating to the Duties of Assessed Taxes, and of the Tax upon the Profits of Property, Professions, Trades, and Offices, and to regulate the Assessment and Collection of the same. (Repealed by Finance Act 1949 (c. 47))
Life Annuities Act 1808 (repealed)	48 Geo. 3. c. 142	2 July 1808
An Act for enabling the Commissioners for the Reduction of the National Debt to grant Life Annuities. (Repealed by Statute Law Revision Act 1872 (No. 2) (35 & 36 Vict. c. 97))
Duties on Certain Licences Act 1808 (repealed)	48 Geo. 3. c. 143	2 July 1808
An Act to repeal the Stamp Duties on Licences granted by Justices of the Peace for selling Ale, Beer, and other Exciseable Liquors by Retail; and for granting other Duties in lieu thereof. (Repealed by Statute Law Revision Act 1872 (No. 2) (35 & 36 Vict. c. 97))
Oyster Fisheries (England) Act 1808 (repealed)	48 Geo. 3. c. 144	2 July 1808
An Act for the more effectual Protection of Oyster Fisheries and the Brood of Oysters in England. (Repealed by Statute Law Revision Act 1873 (36 & 37 Vict. c. 91))
Judges' Pensions (Scotland) Act 1808 (repealed)	48 Geo. 3. c. 145	2 July 1808
An Act for enabling His Majesty to grant Annuities to the Judges of the Court of Session, Justiciary, and Exchequer in Scotland, upon the Resignation of their Offices. (Repealed by Judicial Pensions Act 1981 (c. 20))
Public Buildings (Scotland) Act 1808 (repealed)	48 Geo. 3. c. 146	2 July 1808
An Act for vesting the Stock of the Court of Session in Scotland in Trustees, for the erecting Buildings for the better Accommodation of the College of Justice, and a publick Gaol, in the City of Edinburgh, and for other Purposes therein mentioned. (Repealed by Statute Law Revision Act 1872 (No. 2) (35 & 36 Vict. c. 97))
Sale of Prize Ship Constantia Maria Act 1808 (repealed)	48 Geo. 3. c. 147	2 July 1808
An Act to permit the Sale of the Danish Prize Ship Constantia Maria, and her Cargo, in the Port of Fowey, in the County of Cornwall. (Repealed by Statute Law Revision Act 1872 (No. 2) (35 & 36 Vict. c. 97))
Appropriation Act 1808 (repealed)	48 Geo. 3. c. 148	2 July 1808
An Act for granting to His Majesty a certain Sum of Money out of the Consolidated Fund of Great Britain, and for applying certain Monies therein mentioned for the Service of the Year One thousand eight hundred and eight; and for further appropriating the Supplies granted in this Session of Parliament. (Repealed by Statute Law Revision Act 1872 (No. 2) (35 & 36 Vict. c. 97))
Probate and Legacy Duties Act 1808	48 Geo. 3. c. 149	2 July 1808
An Act for repealing the Stamp Duties on Deeds, Law Proceedings, and other written or printed Instruments, and the Duties on Legacies and Successions to Personal Estate upon Intestacies now payable in Great Britain, and for granting new Duties in lieu thereof.
Local Militia (Scotland) Act 1808 (repealed)	48 Geo. 3. c. 150	4 July 1808
An Act for enabling His Majesty to establish a permanent Local Militia Force in Scotland, under certain Restrictions, for the Defence of the Realm. (Repealed by Local Militia (Scotland) Act 1812 (52 Geo. 3. c. 68))
Court of Session Act 1808 or the Administration of Justice (Scotland) Act 1808 (repealed)	48 Geo. 3. c. 151	4 July 1808
An Act concerning the Administration of Justice in Scotland and concerning Appeals to the House of Lords. (Repealed by Court of Session Act 1988 (c. 36))
Duties on Worts or Wash Act 1808 (repealed)	48 Geo. 3. c. 152	4 July 1808
An Act for granting certain Duties on Worts or Wash made from Sugar during the Prohibition of Distillation from Corn or Grain in Great Britain. (Repealed by Statute Law Revision Act 1872 (No. 2) (35 & 36 Vict. c. 97))

=== Local acts ===
Short title	Citation	Royal assent
Long title
Middleton-in-Teesdale, St. Andrew Auckland and Egleston Bridge Road Act 1808 (repealed)	48 Geo. 3. c. i	11 March 1808
An Act to continue and amend an Act of the Thirty-second Year of His present Majesty, (Note: Durham Roads Act 1792 (32 Geo. 3. c. 127)) for repairing the Road from the Town of Middleton, in Teesdale to the Gate in the New Inclosures called The Edge, in the Parish of Saint Andrews Auckland; and a Branch therefrom to Eggleston Bridge, in the County of Durham. (Repealed by Middleton-in-Teesdale, St. Andrew Auckland and Egleston Bridge Road Act 1829 (10 Geo. 4. c. xxvii))
Winchester Improvement Act 1808	48 Geo. 3. c. ii	11 March 1808
An Act for amending and enlarging the Powers of an Act of His present Majesty, (Note: Winchester Improvement Act 1771 (11 Geo. 3. c. 9)) for paving, cleansing, lighting, and watching the Streets and Publick Passages in the City of Winchester, and several Parishes in the Suburbs thereof, and for removing and preventing Nuisances therein.
Oxford Canal Act 1808 (repealed)	48 Geo. 3. c. iii	11 March 1808
An Act for amending and enlarging the Powers of the several Acts relating to the Oxford Canal Navigation. (Repealed by Oxford Canal Navigation Act 1829 (10 Geo. 4. c. xlviii))
Hurst Green Road Act 1808 (repealed)	48 Geo. 3. c. iv	11 March 1808
An Act for continuing and amending Two Acts of the Fifth (Note: Hurst Green Road Act 1765 (5 Geo. 3. c. 64)) and Twenty-seventh (Note: Hurst Green Road Act 1787 (27 Geo. 3. c. 72)) Years of His present Majesty, for repairing the Road from Hurstgreen (Note: Hurst Green, East Sussex.) to the Extent of the Parish of Burwash, (Note: Burwash, East Sussex.) in the County of Sussex. (Repealed by Roads from Lewes Act 1830 (11 Geo. 4 & 1 Will. 4. c. lxxxii))
Road from Scole Bridge to Bury St. Edmunds Act 1808 (repealed)	48 Geo. 3. c. v	11 March 1808
An Act for enlarging the Term and Powers of Two Acts of His present Majesty, (Note: Scole Bridge to Bury St. Edmunds Road Act 1769 (9 Geo. 3. c. 67)) (Note: Scole Bridge to Bury St. Edmunds Road Act 1788 (28 Geo. 3. c. 97)) for repairing the Road from Scole Bridge to Bury Saint Edmunds, in the County of Suffolk. (Repealed by Scole Bridge and Bury St. Edmunds Road Act 1828 (9 Geo. 4. c. lxxv))
Chapel Allerton Inclosure Act 1808	48 Geo. 3. c. vi	11 March 1808
An Act for enclosing Lands in Chapel Allerton, in the West Riding of the County of York.
Roads from Northallerton and Thirsk Act 1808 (repealed)	48 Geo. 3. c. vii	21 March 1808
An Act for continuing the Term, and enlarging the Powers of Three Acts, (Note: Thirsk Roads Act 1753 (26 Geo. 2. c. 75)) (Note: Thirsk Roads Act 1778 (18 Geo. 3. c. 92)) (Note: Thirsk Roads Act 1794 (34 Geo. 3. c. 118)) for repairing the Road from Northallerton, through Thirsk and Easingwold, to Burton Stone, near the City of York, and also the Road from Thirsk to Topcliffe, in the County of York. (Repealed by Thirsk Turnpike Roads Act 1830 (11 Geo. 4 & 1 Will. 4. c. iv))
East London Waterworks Act 1808 (repealed)	48 Geo. 3. c. viii	21 March 1808
An Act to enable the Company of Proprietors of the East London Water Works to purchase certain other Water Works, and to amend an Act of the Forty-seventh Year of His present Majesty, (Note: East London Waterworks Act 1807 (47 Geo. 3 Sess. 2. c. lxxii)) relating to the said East London Water Works. (Repealed by East London Waterworks Act (No. 2) 1852 (15 & 16 Vict. c. clxiv))
St. Saviour, Southwark, Parochial Rates Act 1808 (repealed)	48 Geo. 3. c. ix	21 March 1808
An Act for better assessing and collecting the Poor and other Rates in the Parish of Saint Saviour, in the Borough of Southwark, in the County of Surrey, and regulating the Poor thereof. (Repealed by London Government (Borough of Southwark) Order in Council 1901 (SR&O 1901/275))
Roads from Hinckley to Melbourne Common Act 1808 (repealed)	48 Geo. 3. c. x	21 March 1808
An Act to continue the Term, and alter and enlarge the Powers of Two Acts (Note: Leicester and Derby Roads Act 1759 (33 Geo. 2. c. 46)) (Note: Hinckley to Melbourne Common Road Act 1774 (14 Geo. 3. c. 110)) of His late and present Majesty for repairing the Roads from Hinckley to Melbourne Common, and other Roads in the said Acts mentioned, in the Counties of Leicester and Derby. (Repealed by Road from Hinckley to Melbourne Common (Derbyshire) Act 1828 (9 Geo. 4. c. v))
Bristol Port Improvement Act 1808 (repealed)	48 Geo. 3. c. xi	21 March 1808
An Act for completing the Improvement of the Port of Bristol. (Repealed by Pilotage Orders Confirmation (No. 5) Act 1921 (11 & 12 Geo. 5. c. cxii))
Easington Inclosure Act 1808	48 Geo. 3. c. xii	21 March 1808
An Act for inclosing Lands in the Parish of Easington, in the North Riding of the County of York.
Barnsley Canal Act 1808	48 Geo. 3. c. xiii	28 March 1808
An Act for amending and enlarging the Powers of an Act of His present Majesty, (Note: Barnsley Canal Act 1793 (33 Geo. 3. c. 110)) for making and maintaining the Barnsley Canal Navigation, and certain Railways and other Roads to communicate therewith; and for increasing the Rates, Tolls, and Duties thereby granted.
Aberbrothock Two Pennies Scots Act 1808 (repealed)	48 Geo. 3. c. xiv	28 March 1808
An Act to continue several Acts for granting a Duty of Two Pennies Scots upon Ale and Beer brewed in the Town of Aberbrothock, in the County of Forfar. (Repealed by Statute Law (Repeals) Act 2013 (c. 2))
Road from Leeds to Roundhay Act 1808 (repealed)	48 Geo. 3. c. xv	28 March 1808
An Act for making and maintaining a Road from Leeds to Rounday in the West Riding of the County of York. (Repealed by Road from Leeds to Roundhay Act 1829 (10 Geo. 4. c. xc))
Minera Inclosure Act 1808	48 Geo. 3. c. xvi	28 March 1808
An Act for inclosing Lands in the Township of Minera, in the Parish of Wrexham, in the County of Denbigh.
Highways in Dumbarton Act 1808 (repealed)	48 Geo. 3. c. xvii	14 April 1808
An Act for regulating the Statute Labour, and repairing the Highways and Bridges, in the County of Dumbarton. (Repealed by Dumbarton Highways and Bridges Act 1829 (10 Geo. 4. c. lxxi))
Croydon Canal Act 1808	48 Geo. 3. c. xviii	14 April 1808
An Act for enabling the Company of Proprietors of the Croydon Canal to complete the same.
Biddenden and Boundgate Road Act 1808 (repealed)	48 Geo. 3. c. xix	14 April 1808
An Act for continuing the Term of Two Acts of His present Majesty, (Note: Biddenden and Boundgate Road Act 1766 (6 Geo. 3. c. 93)) (Note: Biddenden and Boundgate Road Act 1785 (25 Geo. 3. c. 103)) for amending the Road from the Town of Biddenden, (Note: Biddenden, Kent.) to join the Turnpike Road which leads from Ashford to Feversham, at Boundgate, (Note: Boundsgate Corner, on the A251 Ashford Road, south of Badlesmere, Kent. 51°14′31″N 0°52′37″E) in the County of Kent. (Repealed by Biddenden and Boundgate Road (Kent) Act 1829 (10 Geo. 4. c. xxii))
Aberdeen House of Correction Act 1808 (repealed)	48 Geo. 3. c. xx	14 April 1808
An Act for altering and enlarging the Powers of so much of an Act, of the Forty-second Year of His Majesty's Reign, (Note: Aberdeen City Gaol Act 1802 (42 Geo. 3. c. xlvii)) as relates to building and maintaining a House of Correction in and for the City and County of Aberdeen. (Repealed by Aberdeen County and Municipal Buildings Act 1866 (29 & 30 Vict. c. civ))
St. Mary Newington Parochial Rates Act 1808 (repealed)	48 Geo. 3. c. xxi	14 April 1808
An Act for better assessing and collecting the Poor and other Rates, in the Parish of Saint Mary Newington, in the County of Surrey, and regulating the Poor thereof. (Repealed by St. Mary, Newington, Poor Relief and Workhouse Act 1814 (54 Geo. 3. c. cxiii))
King's Lynn Hospitals and Workhouses Act 1808 (repealed)	48 Geo. 3. c. xxii	14 April 1808
An Act to amend and enlarge the Powers of an Act of King William the Third, (Note: King's Lynn Hospitals and Workhouses Act 1700 (12 & 13 Will. 3. c. 6 Pr.)) for erecting Hospitals and Workhouses, in the Borough of King's Lynn, in the County of Norfolk, and for the better employing and maintaining the Poor there. (Repealed by Local Government Board's Provisional Orders Confirmation (Cumberworth, &c.) Act 1876 (39 & 40 Vict. c. xiv))
Tid St. Giles, Newton and Tid St. Mary's Drainage Act 1808	48 Geo. 3. c. xxiii	14 April 1808
An Act for amending and rendering more effectual an Act passed in the Thirteenth Year of His present Majesty, (Note: Isle of Ely, etc. (Drainage) (No. 3) Act 1772 (13 Geo. 3. c. 60)) for draining and preserving certain Lands and Grounds in the Parishes of Tid Saint Giles, and Newton in the Isle of Ely, in the County of Cambridge, and in Tid Saint Mary's, in the County of Lincoln, and for adding thereto certain other Lands in Tid Saint Mary's aforesaid, lying contiguous to the Lands described in the said Act.
Road from Barton Waterside House (Lincolnshire) Act 1808 (repealed)	48 Geo. 3. c. xxiv	14 April 1808
An Act for continuing the Term, and altering and enlarging the Powers of Two Acts of His present Majesty, (Note: Lincoln Roads (No. 2) Act 1765 (5 Geo. 3. c. 88)) (Note: Lincoln Roads (No. 4) Act 1786 (26 Geo. 3. c. 146)) for repairing the Road from Barton Waterside House (Note: Waterside House, Barton Waterside, Lincolnshire. 53°41′47″N 0°26′38″W) to Riseham Hedge Corner, and other Roads therein mentioned, in the County of Lincoln. (Repealed by Road from Barton Waterside House (Lincolnshire) Act 1827 (7 & 8 Geo. 4. c. lxvii))
Road from Gainsborough Bridge (Lincolnshire) Act 1808 (repealed)	48 Geo. 3. c. xxv	14 April 1808
An Act to continue the Term and alter and enlarge the Powers of an Act of His present Majesty, (Note: Lincoln and Nottinghamshire Roads Act 1787 (27 Geo. 3. c. 71)) for making and repairing a Road from the West End of Gainsborough Bridge to East Retford, and to Gringley-upon-the-Hill, in the County of Nottingham. (Repealed by Roads from Gainsborough Bridge (Lincolnshire, Nottinghamshire) Act 1830 (11 Geo. 4 & 1 Will. 4. c. xxv))
Tadcaster Bridge and Hob Moor Lane Road Act 1808 (repealed)	48 Geo. 3. c. xxvi	14 April 1808
An Act to continue the Term and alter and enlarge the Powers of Three Acts of His late and present Majesty, (Note: Tadcaster Bridge and Hob Moor Lane Road Act 1744 (18 Geo. 2. c. 16)) (Note: Tadcaster and York Road Act 1771 (11 Geo. 3. c. 83)) (Note: Tadcaster Bridge and Hob Moor Lane Road Act 1792 (32 Geo. 3. c. 155)) for repairing the Road from Tadcaster Bridge, (Note: Tadcaster Bridge, Tadcaster, North Yorkshire. 53°53′06″N 1°15′36″W) within the County of the City of York, to a Place called Hobmoor Lane End. (Note: The lane to Hob Moor from the A1063 Tadcaster Road, York, at the site of York Tyburn. 53°56′47″N 1°06′06″W) (Repealed by Tadcaster Bridge and Hob Moor Lane Road Act 1833 (3 & 4 Will. 4. c. lxxxiii))
Beverley and Kendell House, and Molescroft and Bainton Balk Roads Act 1808 (repealed)	48 Geo. 3. c. xxvii	14 April 1808
An Act for continuing the Term and altering and enlarging the Powers of Two Acts of His present Majesty, (Note: Beverley and Kendell House, and Molescroft and Bainton Balk Roads Act 1766 (6 Geo. 3. c. 59)) (Note: Beverley and Kendell House, and Molescroft and Bainton Balk Roads Act 1787 (27 Geo. 3. c. 86)) for repairing and widening the Road from Beverley by Molescroft to Kendell House, and from Molescroft to Bainton Balk, in the County of York. (Repealed by Beverley and Kendell House, and Molescroft and Bainton Balk Roads Act 1830 (11 Geo. 4 & 1 Will. 4. c. cxxxi))
Road from Carlisle to Eamont Bridge Act 1808 (repealed)	48 Geo. 3. c. xxviii	14 April 1808
An Act for continuing the Term and altering the Powers of several Acts (Note: Carlisle and Eamont Bridge Road Act 1753 (26 Geo. 2. c. 40)) (Note: Carlisle and Eamont Bridge Road Act 1779 (19 Geo. 3. c. 97)) (Note: Carlisle, Penrith and Eamont Bridge Road Act 1798 (38 Geo. 3. c. xxviii)) for repairing the Road from Carlisle to Penrith, and from Penrith to Eamont Bridge, in the County of Cumberland. (Repealed by Road from Carlisle to Penrith and to Eamont Bridge Act 1830 (11 Geo. 4 & 1 Will. 4. c. cx))
Road from New Chappel to Brighton Act 1808 (repealed)	48 Geo. 3. c. xxix	14 April 1808
An Act for enlarging the Term and Powers of Two Acts of His present Majesty, (Note: Surrey and Sussex Roads Act 1770 (10 Geo. 3. c. 76)) (Note: Surrey and Sussex Roads Act 1790 (30 Geo. 3. c. 97)) for repairing the Road from New Chappel, in the County of Surrey, to Ditcheling Bost Hills in the County of Sussex; and for amending the Road from Ditcheling Bost Hills to Brighthelmstone, (Note: Brighthelmstone is now known as Brighton.) in the County of Sussex. (Repealed by Road from New Chappel to Brighton Act 1830 (11 Geo. 4 & 1 Will. 4. c. xviii))
Spernal Ash and Birmingham Road Act 1808 (repealed)	48 Geo. 3. c. xxx	14 April 1808
An Act tor enlarging the Term and Powers of Two Acts, passed in the Seventh (Note: Warwick Roads Act 1766 (7 Geo. 3. c. 77)) and Eleventh (Note: Spernal Ash to Birmingham Road Act 1771 (11 Geo. 3. c. 61)) Years of His present Majesty, for repairing and widening the Road from Spernal Ash, in the County of Warwick, through Studley, to the Town, of Birmingham. (Repealed by Spernal Ash and Birmingham Road Act 1828 (9 Geo. 4. c. xxxiv))
Road from Wirksworth to Duffield Act 1808 (repealed)	48 Geo. 3. c. xxxi	14 April 1808
An Act for making and maintaining a Road from the Wirksworth Turnpike Road, in the Hamlet of Ideridgehay, to the Town of Duffield, in the County of Derby. (Repealed by Roads from the Wirksworth Turnpike Road Act 1830 (11 Geo. 4 & 1 Will. 4. c. cv))
Cromford Bridge to Langley Mill Road Act 1808 (repealed)	48 Geo. 3. c. xxxii	14 April 1808
An Act to continue the Term, and alter and enlarge the Powers, of Two Acts of His present Majesty, (Note: Cromford Bridge to Langley Mill Road Act 1766 (6 Geo. 3. c. 69)) (Note: Cromford Bridge to Langley Mill Road Act 1786 (26 Geo. 3. c. 124)) for repairing the Road from Cromford Bridge to Langley Mill, in the County of Derby. (Repealed by Cromford Bridge and Langley Mill Road Act 1830 (11 Geo. 4 & 1 Will. 4. c. c))
Road from Clitheroe to Blackburn Act 1808 (repealed)	48 Geo. 3. c. xxxiii	14 April 1808
An Act to continue the Term, and alter and enlarge the Powers, of Two Acts of His present Majesty, (Note: Blackburn Roads Act 1776 (16 Geo. 3. c. 75)) (Note: Blackburn Roads Act 1796 (36 Geo. 3. c. 144)) for repairing the Road from the Market Cross, in the Township of Clitheroe, to Salford Bridge, in the Town of Blackburn, for diverting a Part of the said Road, and for making a Branch of Road to communicate with the Blackburn and Preston Road, all in the County Palatine of Lancaster. (Repealed by Road from Clitheroe to Blackburn Act 1819 (59 Geo. 3. c. li))
Road from High Bridges and from Spath (Staffordshire) Act 1808 (repealed)	48 Geo. 3. c. xxxiv	14 April 1808
An Act to continue the Term, and alter and enlarge the Powers, of Two Acts of His present Majesty, (Note: Stafford Roads (No. 2) Act 1766 (6 Geo. 3. c. 88)) (Note: Stafford Roads Act 1787 (27 Geo. 3. c. 88)) so far as the same relate to the Two Districts of Roads therein described, leading from High Bridges to Uttoxeter, (Note: Uttoxeter, Staffordshire.) and from Spath (Note: Spath, Staffordshire.) to the Halfway from thence to Hanging Bridge, (Note: Hanging Bridge over the River Dove, Mayfield, Staffordshire. 53°00′34″N 1°45′57″W) in the County of Stafford. (Repealed by High Bridges and Uttoxeter, and Spath and Hanging Bridge Roads Act 1828 (9 Geo. 4. c. xxxii))
Gaywood and Mintlyn Inclosures Act 1808	48 Geo. 3. c. xxxv	14 April 1808
An Act for inclosing Lands in the Parishes of Gaywood and Mintlyn, in the County of Norfolk.
Thakeham, Sullington and Shipley Inclosures Act 1808	48 Geo. 3. c. xxxvi	14 April 1808
An Act for inclosing Lands in the Parishes of Thakeham, Sullington, and Shipley, in the County of Sussex.
Road from the Wrotham Heath Turnpike Road Act 1808 (repealed)	48 Geo. 3. c. xxxvii	27 May 1808
An Act to continue and amend Two Acts (Note: Kent and Surrey Roads Act 1765 (5 Geo. 3. c. 68)) (Note: Kent and Surrey Roads Act 1787 (27 Geo. 3. c. 70)) for repairing the Road from the Turnpike Road at Wrotham Heath, in the County of Kent, to the Turnpike Road leading from Croydon to Godstone, in the County of Surrey. (Repealed by Wrotham Heath and Croydon and Godstone Road Act 1829 (10 Geo. 4. c. xx))
Road from the Mansfield and Chesterfield Turnpike Road and from Tupton Nether Green Act 1808 (repealed)	48 Geo. 3. c. xxxviii	27 May 1808
An Act to continue the Term, and alter the Powers, of Two Acts, (Note: Derby Roads (No. 3) Act 1766 (6 Geo. 3. c. 87)) (Note: Derby Roads Act 1788 (28 Geo. 3. c. 89)) for repairing the Road from the Mansfield and Chesterfield Turnpike Road, to Buntingfield Nook, in the County of Derby; and for making a new Road from Tupton Nether Green to Stubbing Edge Lane and Knot Cross, in the said County. (Repealed by Road from Temple Normanton and Road from Tupton Nether Green Act 1830 (11 Geo. 4 & 1 Will. 4. c. xci))
Great and Little Walsingham and Houghton-next-Walsingham Inclosures Act 1808	48 Geo. 3. c. xxxix	27 May 1808
An Act for inclosing Lands in the Parishes of Great Walsingham, Little Walsingham, and Houghton next Walsingham, in the County of Norfolk.
Beverley and Skidby Drainage Act 1808	48 Geo. 3. c. xl	27 May 1808
An Act to alter and amend an Act, passed in the Twenty-fifth Year of His present Majesty, (Note: Saint John in Beverley and Skidby, Yorkshire (Drainage) Act 1785 (25 Geo. 3. c. 92)) for draining, preserving, and improving certain Low Grounds and Carrs, in the several Parishes of Saint John of Beverley and of Slidby, in the East Riding of the County of York.
Inverness Improvement and Bridge Act 1808	48 Geo. 3. c. xli	27 May 1808
An Act for building a Bridge over the River Ness, at Inverness, widening certain Streets, improving the present Harbour, extending the Royalty, supplying the Inhabitants with Water, regulating the Police, and lighting the Streets of the said Burgh.
Gorbals Improvement Act 1808 (repealed)	48 Geo. 3. c. xlii	27 May 1808
An Act for regulating the Police of the Barony of Gorbals, in the County of Lanerk; paving, cleansing, and lighting the Streets and Passages thereof, erecting a Bridewell or Workhouse therein, and for other Purposes relating thereto. (Repealed by Gorbals Improvement Act 1823 (4 Geo. 4. c. lxxi))
Manchester Court of Requests Act 1808 (repealed)	48 Geo. 3. c. xliii	27 May 1808
An Act for the more easy and speedy Recovery of Small Debts within the Parish of Manchester, in the County Palatine of Lancaster. (Repealed by County Courts Act 1846 (9 & 10 Vict. c. 95))
Cranston Hill Waterworks Act 1808 or the Glasgow Water Act 1808	48 Geo. 3. c. xliv	27 May 1808
An Act for the further Supply of the City and Suburbs of Glasgow, and Places adjacent, with Water.
Fermoy Improvement Act 1808	48 Geo. 3. c. xlv	27 May 1808
An Act for paving, cleansing, watching, lighting, and regulating the Streets and other publick Places within the Town of Fermoy, in the County of Cork, and for removing and preventing Nuisances and Obstructions therein, and for establishing a proper Police in the said Town.
Kilmarnock and Troon Railway Act 1808	48 Geo. 3. c. xlvi	27 May 1808
An Act for making a Railway from or near to the Town of Kilmarnock, in the County of Ayr, to a Place called The Troon, in the said County.
Troon Harbour Act 1808	48 Geo. 3. c. xlvii	27 May 1808
An Act for the Improvement of the Harbour of Troon, situate on the West Coast of the County of Ayr.
Tees Navigation Company Act 1808	48 Geo. 3. c. xlviii	27 May 1808
An Act for making a navigable Cut from the East Side of the River Tees near Stockton into the said River near Portrack, in the County of Durham; and making various other Improvements in the Navigation of the said River between the Town of Stockton and the Sea.
Worcester and Birmingham Canal Act 1808	48 Geo. 3. c. xlix	27 May 1808
An Act to amend and enlarge the Powers of the several Acts relating to the Worcester and Birmingham Canal Navigation.
Codsheath, &c. Court of Requests Act 1808 (repealed)	48 Geo. 3. c. l	27 May 1808
An Act for the more easy and speedy Recovery of Small Debts within the Hundred of Codsheath, and other Places therein mentioned, in the County of Kent. (Repealed by County Courts Act 1846 (9 & 10 Vict. c. 95))
Rochester, &c. Court of Requests Act 1808 (repealed)	48 Geo. 3. c. li	27 May 1808
An Act for enlarging the Powers of an Act of His present Majesty, (Note: Kent (Small Debts) Act 1782 (22 Geo. 3. c. 27)) for the more easy and speedy Recovery of Small Debts within the City of Rochester, the Parish of Strood, and several other Parishes and Places in the County of Kent. (Repealed by County Courts Act 1846 (9 & 10 Vict. c. 95))
Road from Maidstone to Key Street Act 1808 (repealed)	48 Geo. 3. c. lii	27 May 1808
An Act for continuing the Term, and altering and enlarging the Powers of Two Acts of His present Majesty, (Note: Maidstone to Key Street Road Act 1769 (9 Geo. 3. c. 78)) (Note: Maidstone to Key Street Road Act 1788 (28 Geo. 3. c. 93)) for repairing the Road from Maidstone to Key Street, in the County of Kent. (Repealed by Road from Maidstone to Key Street Act 1829 (10 Geo. 4. c. xxiv))
Road from Kingston-upon-Hull to Kirk Ella Act 1808 (repealed)	48 Geo. 3. c. liii	27 May 1808
An Act for continuing the Term, and enlarging the Powers of Three Acts of His late and present Majesty, for repairing the Road leading from the Town of Kingston-upon-Hull, to and through the Town of Anlaby, and from thence to the Town of Kirk Ella, in the County of the said Town of Kingston-upon-Hull. (Note: Kingston-upon-Hull Roads Act 1744 (18 Geo. 2. c. 4)) (Note: Kingston-upon-Hull Roads Act 1766 (7 Geo. 3. c. 70)) (Note: Kingston-upon-Hull Roads Act 1788 (28 Geo. 3. c. 95)) (Repealed by Road from Kingston-upon-Hull to Kirk Ella Act 1829 (10 Geo. 4. c. xcii))
Kinross and Alloa Road Act 1808 (repealed)	48 Geo. 3. c. liv	27 May 1808
An Act to continue the Term, and enlarge the Powers, of an Act (Note: Kinross and Alloa Road Act 1797 (37 Geo. 3. c. 171)) for repairing the Road from Kinross, in the County of Kinross, to Alloa, in the County of Clackmannan. (Repealed by Kinross and Alloa Road Act 1829 (10 Geo. 4. c. xci))
Athy and Leighlin Bridge, and Carlow and Castlecomer Roads Act 1808 (repealed)	48 Geo. 3. c. lv	27 May 1808
An Act for repairing the Road from the Town of Athey in the County of Kildare, to the Town of Castlecomer in the County of Kilkenny, and to the Town of Leighlin Bridge in the County of Carlow, and from the Town of Carlow to the said Town of Castlecomer. (Repealed by Athy and Kilkenny, Castlecomer and Leighlin Bridge, and Carlow and Castlecomer Roads Act 1821 (1 & 2 Geo. 4. c. xxxviii))
Road from Chesterfield to Worksop Act 1808 (repealed)	48 Geo. 3. c. lvi	27 May 1808
An Act to continue the Term, and alter and enlarge the Powers, of Three Acts of His late and present Majesty, (Note: Derbyshire Roads Act 1738 (12 Geo. 2. c. 12)) (Note: Derby and Notts Roads Act 1757 (31 Geo. 2. c. 60)) (Note: Chesterfield to Worksop Road Act 1786 (26 Geo. 3. c. 152)) for repairing the Road from Chesterfield, in the County of Derby to Worksop, in the County of Nottingham, and other Roads in the said Acts mentioned, so far as the fame relate to the Read from Chesterfield to Worksop. (Repealed by Chesterfield and Worksop Road Act 1829 (10 Geo. 4. c. lxxx))
Blidworth and Pinxton Green Road (Nottinghamshire) Act 1808 (repealed)	48 Geo. 3. c. lvii	27 May 1808
An Act for enlarging the Term and Powers of an Act of His present Majesty, (Note: Nottinghamshire and Derby Roads (No. 2) Act 1788 (28 Geo. 3. c. 99)) for repairing the Road from the Nottingham and Mansfield Turnpike, in the Liberty of Blidworth to the Colliery near Pinxton Green, in the County of Nottingham. (Repealed by Blidworth and Pinxton Green Road (Nottinghamshire) Act 1830 (11 Geo. 4 & 1 Will. 4. c. vii))
Worksop and Attercliffe Road Act 1808 (repealed)	48 Geo. 3. c. lviii	27 May 1808
An Act for enlarging the Term and Powers of Two Acts of His present Majesty, (Note: Worksop and Attercliffe Road Act 1764 (4 Geo. 3. c. 52)) (Note: Worksop to Attercliffe Road Act 1786 (26 Geo. 3. c. 125)) for repairing the Road from Worksop, in the County of Nottingham, to Attercliffe, in the County of York. (Repealed by Worksop and Attercliffe Road Act 1825 (6 Geo. 4. c. cxlvi))
Nottingham and Mansfield Road Act 1808 (repealed)	48 Geo. 3. c. lix	27 May 1808
An Act for continuing and amending an Act, passed in the Twenty-seventh Year of His present Majesty, (Note: Nottingham to Mansfield Road Act 1787 (27 Geo. 3. c. 76)) for repairing the Road from the Town of Nottingham to the Town of Mansfield, in the County of Nottingham. (Repealed by Nottingham and Mansfield Road Act 1828 (9 Geo. 4. c. xxiii))
Roads from Percy's Cross and from Wooler (Northumberland) Act 1808 (repealed)	48 Geo. 3. c. lx	27 May 1808
An Act for amending an Act, passed in the last Session of Parliament, (Note: Roads from Percy's Cross and from Wooler (Northumberland) Act 1807 (47 Geo. 3 Sess. 2. c. xiii)) for making and maintaining Roads from Percy's Cross to Milfield Burn, and from Wooler to Bowsdon Burn, in the County oi Northumberland. (Repealed by Roads from Percy's Cross and from Wooler (Northumberland) Act 1829 (10 Geo. 4. c. xxviii))
Tunbridge Wells and Uckfield Road Act 1808 (repealed)	48 Geo. 3. c. lxi	27 May 1808
An Act to continue and enlarge the Term and Powers of Two Acts, (Note: Tunbridge Wells to Uckfield Road Act 1766 (6 Geo. 3. c. 85)) (Note: Tunbridge Wells to Uckfield Road Act 1774 (14 Geo. 3. c. 97)) for repairing the Road from Tunbridge Wells, in the County of Kent, to Ringles Cross, near Uckfield, in the County of Sussex. (Repealed by Tunbridge Wells and Uckfield Road Act 1829 (10 Geo. 4. c. lv))
Key Bridge, Tewkesbury Act 1808	48 Geo. 3. c. lxii	27 May 1808
An Act for taking down and rebuilding the Key Bridge across the river Avon, in the Borough of Tewkesbury, in the County of Gloucester, and for making and forming convenient Roads thereto.
Road from Foston Bridge (Lincolnshire) Act 1808 (repealed)	48 Geo. 3. c. lxiii	27 May 1808
An Act for repairing the Road from Foston Bridge, through the Town of Grantham, to the Division Stone on Witham Common, all in the County of Lincoln, and for repealing several Acts (Note: Foston Bridge and Witham Common Road Act 1725 (12 Geo. 1. c. 16)) (Note: Stamford and Grantham Road Act 1738 (12 Geo. 2. c. 8)) (Note: Lincoln and Nottinghamshire Roads Act 1738 (12 Geo. 2. c. 34)) (Note: Stamford and Grantham Road Act 1750 (24 Geo. 2. c. 3)) (Note: Lincoln and Notts Roads Act 1766 (6 Geo. 3. c. 83)) (Note: Lincoln Roads (No. 2) Act 1786 (26 Geo. 3. c. 138)) (Note: Stamford and Grantham Road Act 1787 (27 Geo. 3. c. 92)) relating thereto. (Repealed by Foston Bridge and Witham Common Road (Lincolnshire) Act 1830 (11 Geo. 4 & 1 Will. 4. c. xc))
Road from Macclesfield to Nether Tabley Act 1808 (repealed)	48 Geo. 3. c. lxiv	27 May 1808
An Act for enlarging the Term and Powers of Two Acts of His present Majesty, (Note: Macclesfield and Nether Tabley Road Act 1769 (9 Geo. 3. c. 65)) (Note: Macclesfield and Nether Tabley Road Act 1791 (31 Geo. 3. c. 125)) for repairing the Road from Macclesfield to Nether Tabley, in the County of Chester, and for making a new Road from Birtles to Macclesfield aforesaid. (Repealed by Road from Macclesfield to Nether Tabley Act 1831 (1 Will. 4. c. xv))
Watling Street Road Act 1808 (repealed)	48 Geo. 3. c. lxv	27 May 1808
An Act for the more effectually repairing a certain Road called The Watling Street Road, and other Roads therein mentioned, in the Counties of Salop and Stafford. (Repealed by Statute Law (Repeals) Act 2013 (c. 2))
Keyberry Bridge, Shalldon and Torquay Roads Act 1808 (repealed)	48 Geo. 3. c. lxvi	27 May 1808
An Act for continuing the Term, and altering and enlarging the Powers, of Two Acts of His present Majesty, (Note: Devon Roads (No. 2) Act 1765 (5 Geo. 3. c. 70)) (Note: Devon Roads Act 1787 (27 Geo. 3. c. 74)) for repairing the Roads from Keyberry Bridge to the Passage at Shalldon, and from the said Bridge to the Pier or Harbour of Torquay, in the County of Devon. (Repealed by Newton Abbott and Torquay Roads Act 1823 (4 Geo. 4. c. xvii))
Shrewsbury to Wrexham and Wrexham to Chester Road Act 1808	48 Geo. 3. c. lxvii	27 May 1808
An Act for continuing the Term, and altering and enlarging the Powers, of Two several Acts (Note: Shrewsbury and Wrexham Road Act 1751 (25 Geo. 2. c. 22)) (Note: Shrewsbury and Wrexham Road Act 1756 (29 Geo. 2. c. 93)) of His late and present Majesty, for amending the Road from Shrewsbury to Wrexham, in the County of Denbigh, and from Wrexham to Chester, and federal other Roads therein mentioned, so far as respects the Chester District of the said Roads.
Tunbridge Wells Roads Act 1808 (repealed)	48 Geo. 3. c. lxviii	27 May 1808
An Act for continuing the Term, and altering and enlarging the Powers, of Two Acts of His present Majesty (Note: Kent and Sussex Roads Act 1766 (7 Geo. 3. c. 84)) (Note: Kent and Sussex Roads Act 1772 (12 Geo. 3. c. 92)) for repairing the Roads from Tunbridge Wells in the County of Kent, to Swiftsden, and from Frant to Possingworth Great Wood; and for amending a certain Piece of Road communicating with the said Roads. (Repealed by Tunbridge Wells, Wadhurst and Mayfield Roads Act 1829 (10 Geo. 4. c. lvii))
West Riding Cloth Trade Act 1808 (repealed)	48 Geo. 3. c. lxix	27 May 1808
An Act for removing Doubts as to the Application of certain Surplus Monies paid for measuring, searching, and sealing Cloth, in the West Riding of the County of York, under Two Acts of His present Majesty. (Note: Cloth Manufacture, Yorkshire Act 1765 (5 Geo. 3. c. 51)) (Note: Cloth Manufacture, Yorkshire Act 1766 (6 Geo. 3. c. 23)) (Repealed by West Riding Cloth Trade Regulations Act 1821 (1 & 2 Geo. 4. c. cxvi))
London Bread Trade Act 1808 (repealed)	48 Geo. 3. c. lxx	27 May 1808
An Act to alter and amend an Act of the Thirty-first Year of His late Majesty, (Note: Making of Bread Act 1757 (31 Geo. 2. c. 29)) for the due making of Bread, to regulate the Price and Assize thereof, and to punish Persons who shall adulterate Meal, Flour, or Bread, so far as the same relates to the Weighing of Bread to be baked and sold within the Weekly Bills of Mortality, and within Ten Miles of the Royal Exchange. (Repealed by London Bread Trade Act 1815 (55 Geo. 3. c. xcix))
London Hides and Skins Trade Act 1808 (repealed)	48 Geo. 3. c. lxxi	27 May 1808
An Act for repealing an Act, made in the Forty-third Year of His present Majesty, (Note: London Skin Trade Act 1803 (43 Geo. 3. c. cvi)) for extending the Provisions of Two former Acts (Note: Use of Horse Hides, etc. Act 1800 (39 & 40 Geo. 3. c. 66)) (Note: Damaging of Hides Act 1801 (41 Geo. 3. (U.K.) c. 53)) relating to the Use of Horse Hides in making Boots and Shoes, and preventing the damaging of Raw Hides and Skins in the Flaying thereof, and for making other Provisions in lieu thereof. (Repealed by Horse Hides Act 1824 (5 Geo. 4. c. 57))
Lord le Despencer's Estate Act 1808	48 Geo. 3. c. lxxii	27 May 1808
An Act for vesting detached Parts of the settled Estates of the Right Honourable Thomas Lord Le Despencer, in the County of Kent, in him and his Heirs, and for substituting and settling other Estates of greater Value, and more convenient to be held with the Bulk of the said settled Estates, in lieu thereof, and in Exchange for the same.
Aston's Estate Act 1808	48 Geo. 3. c. lxxiii	27 May 1808
An Act for vesting the detached Estates, devised by the Will of the late Henry Hervey Aston, Esquire, in Trustees, upon Trust to sell the same, and to lay out the Money arising from the Sale thereof in the Purchase of other Estates.
Spicer's Estate Act 1808	48 Geo. 3. c. lxxiv	27 May 1808
An Act for enabling John William Spicer, Esquire, to grant Building Leases of Lands in the Parish of Saint Mary Newington Butts, in the County of Surrey, for Terms of Years not exceeding Ninety-nine Years.
Coke's Estate Act 1808	48 Geo. 3. c. lxxv	27 May 1808
An Act for effectuating an Exchange between Thomas William Coke, Esquire, and the Trustees of his settled Estates.
Fletcher's Estate Act 1808	48 Geo. 3. c. lxxvi	27 May 1808
An Act for vesting certain Manors, Rents, and Tithes, in the Counties of Westmorland and Cumberland, Part of the Estates settled by the Will of Sir Lyonel Wright Fletcher, Baronet, deceased, in Trustees, to be sold, and to enable the Devisees under the same Will to enfranchise certain customary Estates holden of several Manors in the said Counties, settled by the same Will, and for applying Part of the Money arising from such Sales and Enfranchisements in paying off certain Legacies given by the said Will, and vesting the Remainder in the Purchase of other Estates to be settled to the same Uses.
Hospital for Poor French Protestants Act 1808 (repealed)	48 Geo. 3. c. lxxvii	27 May 1808
An Act for enabling the Governor and Directors of the Hospital for Poor French Protestants and their Descendants residing in Great Britain, to grant such Part of the Scite of the Buildings and the Lands belonging to the said Hospital, or such Part thereof as they shall think proper, upon Building Leases. (Repealed by Statute Law (Repeals) Act 2013 (c. 2))
Kirkby Lonsdale Inclosure Act 1808	48 Geo. 3. c. lxxviii	27 May 1808
An Act for inclosing Lands in the Manor of Kirkby Lonsdale, in the County of Westmorland.
Chipping, Mitton and Ribchester Inclosures Act 1808	48 Geo. 3. c. lxxix	27 May 1808
An Act for inclosing Lands in the Parishes of Chipping Mitton and Ribchester, in the County Palatine of Lancaster.
Bawdeswell and Ling Inclosures Act 1808	48 Geo. 3. c. lxxx	27 May 1808
An Act for inclosing Lands in the Parishes of Bawdeswell and Ling, in the County of Norfolk.
Scotter Inclosure Act 1808	48 Geo. 3. c. lxxxi	27 May 1808
An Act for inclosing Lands in the Parish of Scotter, in the County of Lincoln.
Rothbury Inclosure Act 1808	48 Geo. 3. c. lxxxii	27 May 1808
An Act for inclosing Lands in the Parish of Rothbury, in the County of Northumberland.
Abergele Inclosure Act 1808	48 Geo. 3. c. lxxxiii	27 May 1808
An Act for inclosing Lands in the Parish of Abergele, in the County of Denbigh.
Bodham Inclosure Act 1808	48 Geo. 3. c. lxxxiv	27 May 1808
An Act for inclosing Lands in the Parish of Bodham, in the County of Norfolk.
Wicklewood Inclosure Act 1808	48 Geo. 3. c. lxxxv	27 May 1808
An Act for dividing Lands in the Parish of Wicklewood, in the County of Norfolk.
St. Pancras Improvement Act 1808 (repealed)	48 Geo. 3. c. lxxxvi	1 June 1808
An Act for forming, paving, and otherwise improving certain Streets and other publick Passages and Places, in the Parish of Saint Pancras, in the County of Middlesex. (Repealed by London Government (Borough of St. Pancras) Order in Council 1901 (SR&O 1901/274))
Beverley Improvement Act 1808 (repealed)	48 Geo. 3. c. lxxxvii	1 June 1808
An Act for lighting, watching, and regulating the Streets and Lanes, and other publick Passages and Places, in the Town of Beverley, in the County of York. (Repealed by Humberside Act 1982 (c. iii))
Westbury, &c. Court of Requests Act 1808 (repealed)	48 Geo. 3. c. lxxxviii	1 June 1808
An Act for the more easy and speedy Recovery of Small Debts within the Hundreds of Westbury, Warminster, Heytesbury, and Damerham South, in the county of Wilts. (Repealed by County Courts Act 1846 (9 & 10 Vict. c. 95))
Chudleigh Rebuilding Act 1808	48 Geo. 3. c. lxxxix	1 June 1808
An Act for the better and more easy rebuilding of the Town of Chudleigh, in the County of Devon; for determining Differences touching Houses demolished by the late Fire there; and for preventing future Danger by Fire.
Road from Newcastle-under-Lyme to Nantwich Act 1808 (repealed)	48 Geo. 3. c. xc	1 June 1808
An Act to continue the Term, and alter and enlarge the Powers, of Two Acts of His present Majesty, (Note: Stafford and Chester Roads Act 1766 (6 Geo. 3. c. 89)) (Note: Stafford and Chester Roads Act 1786 (26 Geo. 3. c. 153)) for repairing the Road from the Bottom of Church Lane, (Note: Church Street, Newcastle-under-Lyme, Staffordshire.) in the Town of Newcastle-under-Lyme, in the county of Stafford, to the Road from Woor to Chester near Nantwich, (Note: The junction of Newcastle Road and London Road, Nantwich, Chester. 53°03′48″N 2°30′11″W) in the County of Chester, and other Roads therein mentioned. (Repealed by Road from Newcastle-under-Lyme to Nantwich Act 1829 (10 Geo. 4. c. cxv))
Rotherham and Wortley Road Act 1808 (repealed)	48 Geo. 3. c. xci	1 June 1808
An Act for continuing the Term, and altering and enlarging the Powers of an Act of His present Majesty, (Note: Yorkshire Roads (No. 3) Act 1788 (28 Geo. 3. c. 110)) for repairing the Road from Rotherham to The Four Lane Ends, near Wortley, in the West Riding of the County of York. (Repealed by Rotherham and Wortley Road Act 1830 (11 Geo. 4 & 1 Will. 4. c. lxxxiv))
Tilbury Fort Road Act 1808 (repealed)	48 Geo. 3. c. xcii	1 June 1808
An Act for making and maintaining a Road from the Romford and Whitechapel Road, to or near to Tilbury Fort, in the County of Essex. (Repealed by Statute Law (Repeals) Act 2008 (c. 12))
Earl of Ormonde's Estate Act 1808	48 Geo. 3. c. xciii	1 June 1808
An Act for vesting in new Trustees certain Estates and Property in Ireland, of the Right Honourable Walter Earl of Ormond and Offory in Ireland, and Baron Butler in England, which have not been sold or disposed of under and by virtue of Two Acts of Parliament, made in the Thirty-fifth (Note: Earl of Ormonde's Estate Act 1795 (35 Geo. 3. c. 1 Pr. (I))) and Forty-fifth (Note: Earl of Ormonde and Ossory's Estate Act 1805 (45 Geo. 3. c. lxxxiii)) Years of the Reign of His present Majesty.
Stone Inclosure Act 1808	48 Geo. 3. c. xciv	1 June 1808
An Act for inclosing Lands in the Parish of Stone, in the County of Stafford.
Marden, Sutton St. Michael, Sutton St. Nicholas and Withington Inclosures Act 1808	48 Geo. 3. c. xcv	1 June 1808
An Act for inclosing Lands in the Parishes of Marden, Sutton Saint Michael, Sutton Saint Nicholas, and Withington, and certain Chapelries, Townships, and Parishes adjacent thereto, in the County of Hereford.
Commercial Insurance Company of Dublin Act 1808	48 Geo. 3. c. xcvi	3 June 1808
An Act to enable the Commercial Insurance Company of Dublin to sue, and be sued, in the Name of their Secretary.
St. Luke, Middlesex, Poor Relief Act 1808 (repealed)	48 Geo. 3. c. xcvii	3 June 1808
An Act for making more effectual Provision for maintaining, regulating, and employing the Poor of the Parish of Saint Luke, in the County of Middlesex. (Repealed by London Government (Borough of Finsbury) Order in Council 1901 (SR&O 1901/266))
Ashton-under-Lyne, &c. Court of Requests Act 1808 (repealed)	48 Geo. 3. c. xcviii	3 June 1808
An Act for the more easy and speedy Recovery of Small Debts within the Parish of Ashton-under-Lyne, in the County Palatine of Lancaster, and within the Townships of Stayley, and other Places therein mentioned, in the County Palatine of Chester. (Repealed by County Courts Act 1846 (9 & 10 Vict. c. 95))
Grand Surrey Canal Act 1808 (repealed)	48 Geo. 3. c. xcix	3 June 1808
An Act to enable the Company of Proprietors of the Grand Surrey Canal to supply with Water the several Towns, Districts, and Places therein mentioned, and to amend the several Acts relating to the said Canal. (Repealed by Grand Surrey Docks and Canal Act 1855 (18 & 19 Vict. c. cxxxiv))
Kilburn Bridge Road Act 1808 (repealed)	48 Geo. 3. c. c	3 June 1808
An Act for enlarging the Term and Powers of several Acts for repairing the Road from Saint Giles's Pound to Kilbourne Bridge, and for making a new Road from the great Northern Road at Islington to the Edgeware Road near Paddington, in the County of Middlesex. (Repealed by Metropolis Roads Act 1826 (7 Geo. 4. c. cxlii))
Road from Pyecombe to Staplefield Common Act 1808 (repealed)	48 Geo. 3. c. ci	3 June 1808
An Act for making and maintaining a Road from the Brighthelmstone Road at Pyecombe to the Cuckfield Road at Staplefield Common, and from Pyecombe to the Henfield Road at Poynings Common, in the County of Sussex. (Repealed by Pyecombe and Hickstead Roads Act 1826 (7 Geo. 4. c. xxviii))
Crosier's Estate Act 1808	48 Geo. 3. c. cii	3 June 1808
An Act for empowering Trustees to sell and convey the Freehold and Copyhold Estates devised by the Will of John Crofter Esquire, deceased, and to lay out the Money arising by the Sale thereof in the Purchase of other Estates to be settled in lieu thereof, and to the same Uses.
Sheffield and Ecclesall Courts Baron Act 1808 (repealed)	48 Geo. 3. c. ciii	18 June 1808
An Act for regulating the Proceedings in the Courts Baron of the Manors of Sheffield and Ecclesall, in the County of York. (Repealed by County Courts Act 1846 (9 & 10 Vict. c. 95))
Berwick-upon-Tweed Harbour Act 1808 (repealed)	48 Geo. 3. c. civ	18 June 1808
An Act for rebuilding the Pier, and for improving the Harbour of Berwick-upon-Tweed. (Repealed by Berwick-upon-Tweed Harbour Act 1862 (25 & 26 Vict. c. xxxi))
Roads in Inverness Act 1808 (repealed)	48 Geo. 3. c. cv	18 June 1808
An Act for continuing, altering, and enlarging the Powers of so much of an Act of His present Majesty, (Note: Inverness Roads Act 1793 (33 Geo. 3. c. 118)) as relates to making effectual the Statute Labour in the Shire of Inverness, and levying a Conversion of Money in lieu thereof, and otherwise regulating, making, and repairing Highways and Bridges in the said Shire. (Repealed by Inverness County Roads, Bridges and Ferries Act 1830 (11 Geo. 4 & 1 Will. 4. c. lxxviii))
Drogheda Harbour Act 1808	48 Geo. 3. c. cvi	18 June 1808
An Act to continue Two Acts of the Parliament of Ireland, for the Improvement of the Harbour of Drogheda. (Note: Port of Drogheda Act 1790 (30 Geo. 3. c. 39 (I))) (Note: Borough of Drogheda Act 1797 (37 Geo. 3. c. 56 (I)))
Lewes Shire Hall Act 1808 (repealed)	48 Geo. 3. c. cvii	18 June 1808
An Act for enabling the Justices of the Peace for the Eastern Division of the County of Sussex, to take down the present Shire Hall or Sessions House in the Town of Lewes, and for enabling them to build another Shire Hall or Sessions House in a more convenient Situation within the said Town. (Repealed by East Sussex Act 1981 (c. xxv))
River Witham Drainage and Navigation Act 1808 (repealed)	48 Geo. 3. c. cviii	18 June 1808
An Act for rendering more effectual an Act of His present Majesty, (Note: Witham Drainage Act 1762 (2 Geo. 3. c. 32)) for draining certain Low Lands lying on both Sides the River Witham, in the County of Lincoln; and for restoring the Navigation of the said River from the High Bridge in the City of Lincoln River fro to the Sea. (Repealed by Witham Navigation and Drainage Act 1812 (52 Geo. 3. c. cviii))
Hull Court of Requests Act 1808 (repealed)	48 Geo. 3. c. cix	18 June 1808
An Act to amend and enlarge the Powers of an Act, passed in the Second Year of His present Majesty, (Note: Kingston-upon-Hull (Small Debts) Act 1762 (2 Geo. 3. c. 38)) for the more easy and speedy Recovery of small Debts in the Town and County of the Town of Kingston-upon-Hull. (Repealed by County Courts Act 1846 (9 & 10 Vict. c. 95))
Wolverhampton Court of Requests Act 1808 (repealed)	48 Geo. 3. c. cx	18 June 1808
An Act for the more easy and speedy Recovery of Small Debts within the Township of Wolverhampton, and in several Parishes and Places therein mentioned, in the County of Stafford. (Repealed by County Courts Act 1846 (9 & 10 Vict. c. 95))
Henley Bridge Act 1808	48 Geo. 3. c. cxi	18 June 1808
An Act for altering and amending an Act of His present Majesty, (Note: Henley Bridge Act 1781 (21 Geo. 3. c. 33)) for building a Bridge over the River Thames at Henley-upon-Thames in the County of Oxford.
Road from Lauder to Kelso Act 1808 (repealed)	48 Geo. 3. c. cxii	18 June 1808
An Act to continue the Term and enlarge the Powers of Two Acts (Note: Berwick Roads Act 1766 (6 Geo. 3. c. 73)) (Note: Roxburgh Roads Act 1787 (27 Geo. 3. c. 79)) for repairing the Road from Lauder, in the Shire of Berwick, to and through Kelso, in the Shire of Roxburgh, to the Marchburn. (Repealed by Road from Lauder to Kelso Act 1829 (10 Geo. 4. c. lxvi))
Road from Stamford to South Witham Act 1808 (repealed)	48 Geo. 3. c. cxiii	18 June 1808
An Act for more effectually repairing and improving the Road leading from the Town of Stamford, to the Division Stone in South Witham, in the County of Lincoln. (Repealed by Road from Stamford to South Witham Act 1830 (11 Geo. 4 & 1 Will. 4. c. xciii))
Merlin's Bridge and Pembroke Ferry Road Act 1808 (repealed)	48 Geo. 3. c. cxiv	18 June 1808
An Act for continuing the Term of an Act (Note: Merlin's Bridge and Pembroke Ferry Road Act 1788 (28 Geo. 3. c. 102)) for repairing the Road from Merlin's Bridge to Pembroke Ferry, in the County of Pembroke. (Repealed by Merlin's Bridge and Pembroke Ferry Road Act 1830 (11 Geo. 4 & 1 Will. 4. c. xxxv))
Lord Thurlow's Estate Act 1808	48 Geo. 3. c. cxv	18 June 1808
An Act for effecting the Sale of certain Estates devised by the Will of the Right Honourable Edward late Lord Thurlow, and for laying out the Money to arise by such Sales in the Purchase of other Estates, and for settling the same to the Uses of His Lordship's Will.
Dulwich College Estate Act 1808 or the Dulwich College Building Act 1808	48 Geo. 3. c. cxvi	18 June 1808
An Act for enabling the Master, Warden, Fellows, Brethren, Sisters, and Scholars of the College of God's Gift in Dulwich, in the County of Surrey, to grant a Lease or Leases of certain Estates belonging to the same College, in the said County, pursuant to an Agreement entered into for that Purpose; and also to grant Building Leases of other Parts of the same Estates, and for other Purposes therein-mentioned.
Earl of Catherlough's Estate Act 1808	48 Geo. 3. c. cxvii	18 June 1808
An Act for vesting certain Estates in the Counties of Warwick, Middlesex, and Montgomery, late of the Right Honourable Robert Earl of Catherlough, deceased, in Trustees, in trust to be sold, and for investing the Money arising from the Sale thereof in the Purchase of other Estates, to be settled to the subsisting Uses of the Will of the said Robert Earl of Catherlough, and for other Purposes therein mentioned.
Bankes' Estate Act 1808	48 Geo. 3. c. cxviii	18 June 1808
An Act for enabling the Trustees under the Will of William Bankes, Esquire, deceased, to change the Order of Sale of the Real Estates, late of the said William Bankes, and for enabling the Devisees under the Will of the said William Bankes, to grant Leases of such Part of his Estates as shall remain unsold.
De la Pole's Estate Act 1808	48 Geo. 3. c. cxix	18 June 1808
An Act for vesting Part of the settled and devised Estates of Sir John William De la Pole, Baronet, deceased, in Trustees, for Sale, and for settling the remaining Part of the said settled and devised Estates in the Manner therein mentioned.
Legh's Estate Act 1808	48 Geo. 3. c. cxx	18 June 1808
An Act to enable the Trustees of the Will of Thomas Peter Legh, Esquire, deceased, to grant building and repairing Leases of certain Estates in the Parish of Warrington, and in the Township of Bleakley near Manchester, in the County of Lancaster, and to accept Surrenders, and for appointing of new Trustees, and for other Purposes.
Foy's Charity Act 1808 (repealed)	48 Geo. 3. c. cxxi	18 June 1808
An Act for enlarging the Powers of an Act made in the First Year of the Reign of His late Majesty King George the Second, intituled "An Act to perpetuate and better regulate the charitable Foundation of Doctor Nathaniel Foy, late Lord Bishop of Waterford and Lismore, in the City of Waterford," (Note: Foy's Charity Act 1727 (1 Geo. 2. c. 1 Pr. (I))) and for other Purposes therein mentioned. (Repealed by Waterford and Bishop Foy Endowed Schools Act 1902 (2 Edw. 7. c. xxxv))
Amphlett's Marriage Settlement Act 1808	48 Geo. 3. c. cxxii	18 June 1808
An Act for appointing new Trustees for carrying into Execution the Trusts and Powers contained in the Settlement executed on the Marriage of John Amphlett, Esquire, with Eliza Ann his Wife.
Lee's Estate Act 1808	48 Geo. 3. c. cxxiii	18 June 1808
An Act to enable Nathaniel Lee Acton, Esquire, and others to grant Building Leases of Lands at and near Hackney, in the County of Middlesex, devised by the Will of the late Baptist Lee, Esquire.
Cook's Estate Act 1808	48 Geo. 3. c. cxxiv	18 June 1808
An Act for vesting the Share of Thomas Knight Cook, an Infant, of and in the Estates late of the Reverend Thomas Knight, Clerk, deceased, in Trustees, upon Trust to carry the Contracts entered into for the Sale thereof into Execution, or otherwise to sell and dispose of the same, and for investing the Money to arise therefrom under the Direction of the Court of Chancery in the Purchase of other Lands to be conveyed to the Use of him the said Thomas Knight Cook, and his Heirs.
Mellish Estate and Blyth Glebe Lands Act 1808	48 Geo. 3. c. cxxv	18 June 1808
An Act for confirming and rendering valid and effectual an Exchange made in the Year One thousand seven hundred and sixty-two, between William Mellish, Esquire, deceased and Charles Mellise, Esquire, his eldest Son, also deceased, and the Vicar of Blyth, in the County of Nottingham, of Lands and Hereditaments, of the said William Mellish and Charles Mellish, in the Parish of Blyth, for a small Part of the Glebe belonging to the said Vicarage.
Vere's Estate Act 1808	48 Geo. 3. c. cxxvi	18 June 1808
An Act to enable John Holton Vere, Devisee for his own Life in Possession of certain Freehold and Copyhold Estates situate at or near Kilburn in the Parish of Hampstead, in the County of Middlesex, under and by virtue of the Will and Codicil of Holton Vere, late of Saint Martin's Lane, in the said County of Middlesex, Gentleman, deceased, to grant Building Leases of the same Estates for any Term not exceeding the Term of Ninety-nine Years.
Manchester Infirmary Act 1808	48 Geo. 3. c. cxxvii	18 June 1808
An Act for enabling Sir Oswald Mosley Baronet, to grant certain Lands and Hereditaments in the Parish of Manchester, in the County Palatine of Lancaster, for the Purposes of the Manchester publick Infirmary, Dispensary, Lunatick Hospital, and Asylum, and for vesting the Property and Effects belonging to the said Charity in Trustees for the Benefit thereof.
Watlington Inclosure Act 1808	48 Geo. 3. c. cxxviii	18 June 1808
An Act for inclosing Lands in the Parish of Watlington, in the County of Oxford.
Hathersage Inclosure Act 1808	48 Geo. 3. c. cxxix	18 June 1808
An Act for inclosing Lands in the Parish of Hathersage, in the County of Derby.
Chertsey Allotments Act 1808	48 Geo. 3. c. cxxx	18 June 1808
An Act for allotting Lands in the Parish of Chertsey and Manor of Chertsey Bedmond, in the County of Surrey.
St. Asaph Inclosure Act 1808	48 Geo. 3. c. cxxxi	18 June 1808
An Act for inclosing Lands in that Part of the Parish of Saint Asaph, in the Counties of Flint and Denbigh, which is not within the Franchise of Rhuddian, in the said County of Flint.
Horton Inclosure Act 1808	48 Geo. 3. c. cxxxii	18 June 1808
An Act for inclosing Lands in the Manor of Horton, in the County of Stafford.
Charnwood Forest and Rothley Plain Inclosure Act 1808	48 Geo. 3. c. cxxxiii	18 June 1808
An Act for allotting and inclosing the Forest or Chase of Charnwood, otherwise Charley Forest or Chase, and Rothley Plain, in the County of Leicester.
Kingston-upon-Thames and Imworth Inclosure, Court House and Market House Act 1808	48 Geo. 3. c. cxxxiv	18 June 1808
An Act for inclosing Lands in the several Manors of Kingston-upon-Thames and Imworth, otherwise Imbercourt, in the County of Surrey, and for selling Part of such Lands for the Purpose of providing a Court House and Market House for the said Town.
Checkley Inclosure Act 1808	48 Geo. 3. c. cxxxv	18 June 1808
An Act for inclosing Lands in the Parish of Checkley, in the County of Stafford.
Londonderry Water Supply, Harbour and Court of Requests Act 1808	48 Geo. 3. c. cxxxvi	23 June 1808
An Act to amend Two Acts, (Note: Londonderry Bridge Act 1790 (30 Geo. 3 (I). c. 31 (I))) (Note: Londonderry Bridge Act 1800 (40 Geo. 3 (I). c. 41 (I))) so far as relate to supplying the City of Londonderry with Water, improving the Harbour of the said City, and the Regulation of Pilots and Vessels using the same; and for extending the Jurisdiction of the Court held in the said City for the Recovery of Small Debts.
Colchester Water Act 1808 (repealed)	48 Geo. 3. c. cxxxvii	23 June 1808
An Act for supplying with Water the inhabitants of the Borough of Colchester, in the County of Essex. (Repealed by Colchester Waterworks Act 1879 (42 & 43 Vict. c. cxxi))
Road through Haslemere Act 1808 (repealed)	48 Geo. 3. c. cxxxviii	23 June 1808
An Act to continue the Term, and alter and enlarge the Powers, of Two Acts of His present Majesty, (Note: Milford to Portsmouth Road Act 1764 (4 Geo. 3. c. 63)) (Note: Milford to Portsmouth Road Act 1787 (27 Geo. 3. c. 95)) for amending the Road from near Milford, through Haslemere, to the Portsmouth Road between Lippock and Rake, in the Counties of Surrey, Sussex, and Southampton. (Repealed by Milford and Haslemere Road Act 1831 (1 Will. 4. c.xxviii))
Roads from Tavernspite (Pembrokeshire) Act 1808 (repealed)	48 Geo. 3. c. cxxxix	23 June 1808
An Act for repairing the Roads from Tavernspite to the Towns of Pembroke and Tenby, and to Hubberston Haking, and from Loveston Mountain to Canaston Bridge, in the County of Pembroke. (Repealed by Roads from Tavernspite Act 1828 (9 Geo. 4. c. cvi))
Snailwell and Burgate Advowsons Exchange Act 1808	48 Geo. 3. c. cxl	23 June 1808
An Act for carrying into Execution an Agreement entered into between the Honourable and Right Reverend James Lord Bishop of Ely and John Thorp the Elder, of Chippenham Park. in the County of Cambridge, Esquire, for the Exchange of the Advowson of the Rectory of Snailwell, in the County of Cambridge, Part of the Possessions of the See of Ely, for the Rectory of Burgate, in the County of Suffolk, vested in the said John Tharp.
Earl of Hardwicke's Estate Act 1808	48 Geo. 3. c. cxli	25 June 1808
An Act for vesting the settled Estates of the Right Honourable Philip Earl of Hardwicke, situate in the County of Gloucester, in Trustees, upon trust, as to certain Parts which have been contracted to be sold, to convey the same to the respective Purchasers, and as to the Residue, in trust to sell the same, and for investing the Purchase Monies, under the Direction of the High Court of Chancery, in other Estates to be settled in lieu thereof, and to the same Uses.
Bishop of London's (Paddington) Estate Act 1808	48 Geo. 3. c. cxlii	25 June 1808
An Act for altering and enlarging the Powers of several Acts, passed in the Thirty-fifth, (Note: Bishop of London's (Paddington) Estate Act 1795 (35 Geo. 3. c. 83 Pr.)) Forty-fourth, (Note: Bishop of London's (Paddington) Estate Act 1804 (44 Geo. 3. c. 63 Pr.)) and Forty-fifth (Note: Bishop of London's (Paddington) Estate Act 1805 (45 Geo. 3. c. cxiii)) Years of the Reign of His present Majesty, for enabling the Lord Bishop of London to grant a Lease, with Powers of Renewal, of Lands in the Parish of Paddington, in the County of Middlesex, for the Purpose of building upon.
Daniel's Estate Act 1808	48 Geo. 3. c. cxliii	25 June 1808
An Act for vesting in Trustees, the Personal Estate of the Reverend Richard Daniel, Master of Arts in the University of Dublin, and making them a Corporation for the Purposes of carrying into Effect the charitable Designs and Intentions of the Will of the said Richard Daniel.
Careswell's Estate Act 1808	48 Geo. 3. c. cxliv	25 June 1808
An Act for vesting the Fee Simple of the Estates devised by the Will of Edward Careswell, Gentleman deceased, in Trustees for the charitable Purposes therein mentioned.
Maynooth Academy Act 1808 (repealed)	48 Geo. 3. c. cxlv	25 June 1808
An Act to amend Two Acts passed in Ireland, (Note: Maynooth College Act 1795 (35 Geo. 3. c. 21 (I))) (Note: Maynooth College Act 1800 (40 Geo. 3. c. 85 (I))) for the better Education of Persons professing the Roman Catholick Religion, and for the better Government of the Seminary established at Maynooth for the Education of such Persons, so far as relates to the Purchase of Lands and compounding Suits. (Repealed by Statute Law (Repeals) Act 2013 (c. 2))
Woolwich Water Supply and Market Act 1808 (repealed)	48 Geo. 3. c. cxlvi	30 June 1808
An Act for supplying the Town and Parish of Woolwich, in the County of Kent, with Water, and for amending so much of an Act of the last Session (Note: Woolwich Improvement Act 1807 (47 Geo. 3 Sess. 2. c. cxi)) as relates to the Erection of a Market House in the said Town. (Repealed by London Government (Borough of Woolwich) Order in Council 1901 (SR&O 1901/223))
Road from Milford to Stainton (Pembrokeshire) Act 1808 (repealed)	48 Geo. 3. c. cxlvii	30 June 1808
An Act for repairing the Road from Milford to Stainton, and to Merlin's Bridge, and from thence to Cartlet Bridge, and to the Top of Merlin's Hill, in the County of Pembroke. (Repealed by Road from Milford through Stainton (Pembrokeshire) Act 1829 (10 Geo. 4. c. cxxxiv))
Leominster and Luston Inclosure and Improvement Act 1808 (repealed)	48 Geo. 3. c. cxlviii	30 June 1808
An Act for inclosing Lands in the Borough of Leominster, in the County of Hereford, and in the Township of Luston, in the Parish of Eye, in the said County; and for paving, and otherwise improving, the Streets and other publick Places within the Town of Leominster, in the said County. (Repealed by Statute Law (Repeals) Act 1998 (c. 43))
St. John's College, Oxford and Hull's Estate Act 1808	48 Geo. 3. c. cxlix	30 June 1808
An Act for effectuating an Exchange between the President and Scholars of Saint John Baptist College, in the University of Oxford, and Christopher Hull of Footscray, in the County of Kent, Esquire.
Paul's Estate Act 1808	48 Geo. 3. c. cl	30 June 1808
An Act to confirm and render valid and effectual a Partition of divers Lands and Hereditaments in the Counties of Carlow and Kildare, in Ireland, formerly the Estates of Jeffery Paul Esquire, deceased.
Huggett's Estate Act 1808	48 Geo. 3. c. cli	30 June 1808
An Act for vesting Part of the Estates of Paulin Hugget, an Infant, in Trustees, to be sold, and for applying the Money arising therefrom in part Discharge of certain Incumbrances charged thereon.
Kirk Smeaton Inclosure Act 1808	48 Geo. 3. c. clii	30 June 1808
An Act for inclosing Lands in the Parish of Kirk Smeaton, in the West Riding of the County of York.
Tewkesbury Inclosure Act 1808	48 Geo. 3. c. cliii	30 June 1808
An Act for inclosing Lands in the Borough and Parish of Tewkesbury, in the County of Gloucester, and for vesting the After or Latter Math of a Meadow called Severn Ham, within the said Borough and Parish, in Trustees for certain Purposes.
Earl of Moira and Countess of Loudoun Estates Act 1808	48 Geo. 3. c. cliv	2 July 1808
An Act for exchanging Part of the settled Estates of the Right Honourable Francis Earl of Moira, situate in England, for Part of the Estates of the Right Honourable Flora Mure, Countess of Loudoun, his Wife, situated in Scotland, including the Castle of Loudoun.
Bonner's Estate Act 1808	48 Geo. 3. c. clv	2 July 1808
An Act for vesting an Estate called Killingworth Farm, in the County of Northumberland, being an Estate devised by the Will of Thomas Bonner Esquire, deceased, in Trustees, to be sold, for the Payment of Legacies, and for laying out the Residue of the Money in the Purchase of other Estates to be settled to the same Uses.
Gaussen's Estate Act 1808	48 Geo. 3. c. clvi	2 July 1808
An Act for vesting in Samuel Robert Gaussen, of North Mimms, in the County of Hertford, Esquire, a Messuage and Farm, with the Appurtenances, in North Mimms aforesaid, and for applying the Money to arise thereby in the Purchase of other Estates to be settled to the same Uses as the Estate sold.
Simonburn Presentation Right Act 1808	48 Geo. 3. c. clvii	4 July 1808
An Act to prevent the Right of Presentation to the Rectory and Parish Church of Simonburn, in the County of Northumberland, from lapsing, for a limited Time.

=== Private acts ===
Short title	Citation	Royal assent
Long title
Annesley Inclosure Act 1808	48 Geo. 3. c. 1 Pr.	27 February 1808
An Act for inclosing Lands in the Parish of Annesley, in the County of Nottingham.
Aldbrough Inclosure Act 1808	48 Geo. 3. c. 2 Pr.	27 February 1808
An Act for inclosing Lands in the Township of Aldbrough, in the County of York.
Essington and Bushbury Inclosure Act 1808	48 Geo. 3. c. 3 Pr.	21 March 1808
An Act for inclosing Lands in the Manor of Essington, and Parish of Bushbury, in the County of Stafford.
Harlton Inclosure Act 1808	48 Geo. 3. c. 4 Pr.	21 March 1808
An Act for inclosing Lands in the Parish of Harlton, in the County of Cambridge.
West Tarring Inclosure Act 1808	48 Geo. 3. c. 5 Pr.	21 March 1808
An Act for inclosing Lands in the Parish of West Tarring, and the Precincts thereof, in the County of Sussex.
Lord Grenville's Estate Act 1808	48 Geo. 3. c. 6 Pr.	14 April 1808
An Act for vesting certain Lands belonging to the Right Honourable William Wyndham Lord Grenville, and Ann Baroness Grenville, his Wife, and a Parsonage House to be built on the said Lands, in the Rector for the Time being of the united Parishes of Boconnoc and Braddock, in the County of Cornwall, in Exchange for the Parsonage House of Boconnoc, and certain Glebe Lands belonging to that Part of the said united Parishes called Boconnoc.
Earl of Cassillis's Estate Act 1808	48 Geo. 3. c. 7 Pr.	14 April 1808
An Act for empowering the Judges of the Court of Session in Scotland to sell such Parts and Portions of the entailed Estate of Cullean, and other Hereditaments, situated in the County of Ayr, which belonged to, and were entailed by David, late Earl of Cassillis, deceased, as shall be sufficient for Payment of the Debts contracted by him and his Predecessors, still owing and affecting, or which may be made to affect the said entailed Estate; and for creating a Fund for the Purchase of other Lands and Heritages to be entailed in lieu of the Parts and Portions so sold.
Clophill Inclosure Act 1808	48 Geo. 3. c. 8 Pr.	14 April 1808
An Act for inclosing Lands in the Parish of Clophill, in the County of Bedford.
Fetherstone Inclosure Act 1808	48 Geo. 3. c. 9 Pr.	14 April 1808
An Act for inclosing Lands in the Manor of Fetherstone, in the Parishes of Haltwhislle and Lamley, in the County of Northumberland.
Llangunnog, &c. Inclosure Act 1808	48 Geo. 3. c. 10 Pr.	14 April 1808
An Act for inclosing Lands in the Parishes of Llangunnog and Llanstephan, in the County of Carmarthen.
Isell Inclosure Act 1808	48 Geo. 3. c. 11 Pr.	14 April 1808
An Act for inclosing Lands in the Parish of Isell, in the County of Cumberland.
Tivetshall Inclosure Act 1808	48 Geo. 3. c. 12 Pr.	14 April 1808
An Act for inclosing Lands in the Parishes of Tivetshall Saint Margaret, and Tivetshall Saint Mary, in the County of Norfolk.
Orlingbury Inclosure Act 1808	48 Geo. 3. c. 13 Pr.	14 April 1808
An Act for inclosing Lands in Orlingbury, in the County of Northampton.
Irthlingborough Inclosure Act 1808	48 Geo. 3. c. 14 Pr.	14 April 1808
An Act for inclosing Lands in Irthlingborough, in the County of Northampton.
Quarn Inclosure Act 1808	48 Geo. 3. c. 15 Pr.	14 April 1808
An Act for inclosing Lands in the Township of Quarn, otherwise Quarndon, in the County of Derby.
Brome, &c. Inclosure Act 1808	48 Geo. 3. c. 16 Pr.	14 April 1808
An Act for inclosing Lands in the Parishes of Brome, Oakley, Threandeston, Taxley, and Eye, in the County of Suffolk.
Priorsdean Inclosure Act 1808	48 Geo. 3. c. 17 Pr.	14 April 1808
An Act for inclosing Lands in the Manor of Priorsdean and Colmar, otherwise Colemore, in the County of Southampton.
Beckett's Name Act 1808	48 Geo. 3. c. 18 Pr.	14 April 1808
An Act to enable the Reverend Thomas à Beckett, and his Issue Male, to take the Name, and bear the Arms of Turner, pursuant to the Will of Martha Turner; Widow, deceased.
Paschoud's Naturalization Act 1808	48 Geo. 3. c. 19 Pr.	14 April 1808
An Act for naturalising Charles Frederick Paschoud.
Cathcart's Estate Act 1808	48 Geo. 3. c. 20 Pr.	27 May 1808
An Act for empowering the Judges of the Court of Session in Scotland to sell such Parts of the entailed Estates of Carbiston and Pitcairly, in the Counties of Ayr and Fife, in Scotland, belonging to James Cathcart, Esquire, as shall be sufficient for Payment of the Debts affecting the same.
Wormegay Inclosure Act 1808	48 Geo. 3. c. 21 Pr.	27 May 1808
An Act to amend an Act of His present Majesty (Note: Wormegay Inclosure and Drainage Act 1806 (46 Geo. 3. c. cvii)) for inclosing and draining Lands within the Honor, Manor, and Parish of Wormegay, in the County of Norfolk.
Luton Inclosure Act 1808	48 Geo. 3. c. 22 Pr.	27 May 1808
An Act for inclosing Lands in the Parish of Luton, in the County of Bedford.
Pulborough Inclosure Act 1808	48 Geo. 3. c. 23 Pr.	27 May 1808
An Act for inclosing North Heath Common, in the Parish of Pulborough, in the County of Sussex.
Bredon Inclosure Act 1808	48 Geo. 3. c. 24 Pr.	27 May 1808
An Act for inclosing Lands in the Parish of Bredon, in the County of Worcester.
Cartmel Inclosure Act 1808	48 Geo. 3. c. 25 Pr.	27 May 1808
An Act to amend an Act, made in the Thirty-sixth Year of His present Majesty, (Note: Cartmel Inclosure Act 1796 (36 Geo. 3. c. 64 Pr.)) for inclosing Lands in the Parish of Cartmel, in the County Palatine of Lancaster.
Easingwold Inclosure Act 1808	48 Geo. 3. c. 26 Pr.	27 May 1808
An Act for inclosing Lands in the Township of Easingwold, in the North Riding of the County of York.
Carlton Inclosure Act 1808	48 Geo. 3. c. 27 Pr.	27 May 1808
An Act for inclosing Lands in the Manor and Township of Carlton, in the Parish of Coverham, in the North Riding of the County of York.
Womborn Inclosure Act 1808	48 Geo. 3. c. 28 Pr.	27 May 1808
An Act for inclosing Lands in the several Townships or Liberties of Womborn, Orton, and Swindon, in the Parish of Womborn in the County of Stafford.
Blisworth Inclosure Act 1808	48 Geo. 3. c. 29 Pr.	27 May 1808
An Act for inclosing Lands in Blisworth, in the County of Northampton.
Swineshead Inclosure Act 1808	48 Geo. 3. c. 30 Pr.	27 May 1808
An Act for inclosing Lands in the Parish of Swineshead, in the County of Huntingdon.
Winterborne Monkton Inclosure Act 1808	48 Geo. 3. c. 31 Pr.	27 May 1808
An Act for inclosing Lands in the Parish of Winterbourne Waste, otherwise Monckton, in the County of Dorset.
Winterbourne Abbas Inclosure Act 1808	48 Geo. 3. c. 32 Pr.	27 May 1808
An Act for inclosing Lands in the Parish of Winterbourne Abbas, in the County of Dorset.
Hankerton Inclosure Act 1808	48 Geo. 3. c. 33 Pr.	27 May 1808
An Act for inclosing Lands in the Parish of Hankerton, in the County of Wilts.
Strelley Inclosure Act 1808	48 Geo. 3. c. 34 Pr.	27 May 1808
An Act for inclosing, and exonerating from Tithes, Lands in the Parishes of Strelley and Bilborough, in the County of Nottingham.
Byford Inclosure Act 1808	48 Geo. 3. c. 35 Pr.	27 May 1808
An Act for inclosing Lands in the Parish of Byford, in the County of Hereford.
Bolton Inclosure Act 1808	48 Geo. 3. c. 36 Pr.	27 May 1808
An Act for inclosing Lands in the Manor of Bolton, in the County of Westmorland.
Cley and Field Dalling Inclosure Act 1808	48 Geo. 3. c. 37 Pr.	27 May 1808
An Act for inclosing Lands in the Parishes of Cley next the Sea and Field Dalling, in the County of Norfolk.
Harlington Inclosure Act 1808	48 Geo. 3. c. 38 Pr.	27 May 1808
An Act for inclosing Lands in the Parish of Harlington, in the County of Bedford.
Llanddeiniolen Inclosure Act 1808	48 Geo. 3. c. 39 Pr.	27 May 1808
An Act to alter, amend, and explain an Act of His present Majesty, (Note: Llanddeiniolen Inclosure Act 1806 (46 Geo. 3. c. 29 Pr.)) for inclosing Lands in the Parish of Llandeniolen, in the County of Carnarvon.
Chute Inclosure Act 1808	48 Geo. 3. c. 40 Pr.	27 May 1808
An Act for inclosing Lands in the Parish of Chute, in the County Wilts.
Ashmanhaugh Inclosure Act 1808	48 Geo. 3. c. 41 Pr.	27 May 1808
An Act for inclosing Lands in the Parish of Ashmanhaugh, in the County of Norfolk.
Neatishead Inclosure Act 1808	48 Geo. 3. c. 42 Pr.	27 May 1808
An Act for inclosing Lands in the Parish of Neatishead, in the County of Norfolk.
North Walsham, &c. Inclosure Act 1808	48 Geo. 3. c. 43 Pr.	27 May 1808
An Act for inclosing Lands in the Parishes of North Walsham and Felmingham, in the County of Norfolk.
Bishopstrow, &c. Inclosure Act 1808	48 Geo. 3. c. 44 Pr.	27 May 1808
An Act for inclosing Lands in the Parish of Bishopstrow, in the County of Wilts; and also a Common Pasture, called Pitmead, in the said Parish, and the Parishes of Warminster, Norton Bavant, and Sutton Veny, in the said County.
Upton cum Chalvey Inclosure Act 1808	48 Geo. 3. c. 45 Pr.	27 May 1808
An Act for inclosing Lands in the Parish of Upton-cum-Chalvey, in the County of Buckingham.
Aston Upthorpe Inclosure Act 1808	48 Geo. 3. c. 46 Pr.	27 May 1808
An Act for inclosing Lands in the Hamlet of Aston Upthorpe, and in the Parish of Aston Tirrold, in the County of Berks.
Great Croglin Inclosure Act 1808	48 Geo. 3. c. 47 Pr.	27 May 1808
An Act for inclosing Lands in Great Croglin, in the County of Cumberland.
Claxton and Rockland (Norfolk) Inclosure Act 1808	48 Geo. 3. c. 48 Pr.	27 May 1808
An Act for inclosing Lands in the Parishes of Claxton and Rockland, in the County of Norfolk.
Codford St. Peter Inclosure Act 1808	48 Geo. 3. c. 49 Pr.	27 May 1808
An Act for inclosing Lands in the Parish of Godford Saint Peter, in the County of Wilts.
Stein's Naturalization Act 1808	48 Geo. 3. c. 50 Pr.	27 May 1808
An Act for naturalizing John Henry Stein.
Usko's Naturalization Act 1808	48 Geo. 3. c. 51 Pr.	27 May 1808
An Act for naturalizing John Frederick Usko.
Saighton Inclosure Act 1808	48 Geo. 3. c. 52 Pr.	1 June 1808
An Act for inclosing Lands in the Township of Saighton, in the County Palatine of Chester.
Deerhurst and Leigh Inclosure Act 1808	48 Geo. 3. c. 53 Pr.	1 June 1808
An Act for inclosing Lands in the Parishes of Deerhurst and Lye, otherwise Leigh, in the County of Gloucester.
Langford Inclosure Act 1808	48 Geo. 3. c. 54 Pr.	1 June 1808
An Act for inclosing Lands in the Township of Langford, in the Counties of Berks and Oxford; or one of them.
Frieston and Butterwick Inclosure Act 1808	48 Geo. 3. c. 55 Pr.	3 June 1808
An Act for embanking the Salt Marshes in the Parishes of Frieston and Butterwick, in the County of Lincoln, and for inclosing the same, and other Lands within the said Parishes.
Ingle's Estate Act 1808	48 Geo. 3. c. 56 Pr.	18 June 1808
An Act for vesting the settled Estates of John Ingle and Margaret his Wife, in Trustees to be sold, and for laying out the Monies thence arising in the Purchase of other Estates to be settled to the same Uses as the Estates sold.
Rothiemurchus Estate Act 1808	48 Geo. 3. c. 57 Pr.	18 June 1808
An Act for enabling the Heirs of Entail in Possession for the Time being of the Lands and Estate of Rothiemurchus, in the County of Inverness, North Britain, under the Authority of the Court of Session, to contract for the Sale of the Fir Woods growing thereon, and for the better Execution and Fulfilment of the Powers and Conditions contained in the Deed of Entail affecting the said Lands and Estate.
Fulbourn Inclosure Act 1808	48 Geo. 3. c. 58 Pr.	18 June 1808
An Act for altering and amending an Act of His present Majesty, (Note: Fulbourn Inclosure Act 1806 (46 Geo. 3. c. 56 Pr.)) for inclosing Lands in the Township of Fulbourn, in the County of Cambridge.
Waresley Inclosure Act 1808	48 Geo. 3. c. 59 Pr.	18 June 1808
An Act for inclosing Lands in the Parish of Waresley in the Count of Huntingdon, and for allotting Lands in the Parish of Gamblingay, in the County of Cambridge.
Girton Inclosure Act 1808	48 Geo. 3. c. 60 Pr.	18 June 1808
An Act for alloting and dividing Lands in the Parish of Girton, in the County of Cambridge.
Fylingdales Inclosure Act 1808	48 Geo. 3. c. 61 Pr.	18 June 1808
An Act for inclosing Lands in the Township of Fylingdales, in the County of York.
West Markham Inclosure Act 1808	48 Geo. 3. c. 62 Pr.	18 June 1808
An Act for inclosing Lands in the Parish of West Markham, in the County of Nottingham.
Portchester Inclosure Act 1808	48 Geo. 3. c. 63 Pr.	18 June 1808
An Aft for inclosing Lands in the Parish of Portchester, otherwise Porchester, in the County of Southampton.
Hillam Inclosure Act 1808	48 Geo. 3. c. 64 Pr.	18 June 1808
An Act to alter and amend an Act, passed in the Thirty-seventh Year of His present Majesty, (Note: Hillam Inclosure Act 1797 (37 Geo. 3. c. 138 Pr.)) for inclosing Lands in the Manor and Township of Hillam, in the Parish of Monk Fryston, in the West Riding of the County of York.
Skegby Inclosure Act 1808	48 Geo. 3. c. 65 Pr.	18 June 1808
An Act for inclosing Lands in the Manor or Parish of Skegby, in the County of Nottingham.
Tregrug Inclosure Act 1808	48 Geo. 3. c. 66 Pr.	18 June 1808
An Act for inclosing Lands in the Manor of Tregrug, in the County of Monmouth.
Fulmodeston with Croxton Inclosure Act 1808	48 Geo. 3. c. 67 Pr.	18 June 1808
An Act for allotting Lands in the Parishes of Fulmodeston with Croxton, Stibbard, Little Ryburgh, and Great Ryburgh, in the County of Norfolk.
Sherfield English Inclosure Act 1808	48 Geo. 3. c. 68 Pr.	18 June 1808
An Act to amend an Act of His present Majesty, (Note: Sherfield English Inclosure Act 1806 (46 Geo. 3. c. 23 Pr.)) for inclosing a certain Warren called Sherfield Warren, in the Parish of Sherfield English, in the County of Southampton.
Haase's Naturalization Act 1808	48 Geo. 3. c. 69 Pr.	18 June 1808
An Act for naturalizing Albertina Haase and Sophia Haase.
Gamston Inclosure Act 1808	48 Geo. 3. c. 70 Pr.	23 June 1808
An Act for inclosing Lands in the Parish of Gamston, in the County of Nottingham.
Llanbedrog, &c. Inclosure Act 1808	48 Geo. 3. c. 71 Pr.	25 June 1808
An Act for inclosing Lands in the several Parishes of Llanbedrog, Llanfihangel, Bachelleth, Llangian, and Llaniestyn, in the County of Carnarvon.
Birmingham's Estate Act 1808	48 Geo. 3. c. 72 Pr.	30 June 1808
An Act for vesting the Real, Freehold, and Chattel Estates and Lands, which formerly belonged to William Birmingham, late of Rosshill, in the County of Galway, Esquire, deceased, in Trustees, to be sold for the Payment of his Debts and Legacies, and for laying out the Surplus of the Monies arising from such Sale or Sales, after Payment of such Debts and Legacies, in the Purchase of Lands, Tenements, and Hereditaments, in Ireland, to be limited and settled to the several Uses and upon the Trusts therein mentioned.
Deane's Estate Act 1808	48 Geo. 3. c. 73 Pr.	30 June 1808
An Act to enable the Executrix and Executors in Trust of the Will of Alexander Deane to grant Leases of Lands and Grounds in the City of Cork, and in the Liberties of the said City, and to apply the Rents and Profits thereof to the Uses of the said Will.
Ardington Inclosure Act 1808	48 Geo. 3. c. 74 Pr.	30 June 1808
An Act for inclosing Lands in the Parish of Ardington, in the County of Berks, and in the several Parishes, Tythings, or Hamlets of East Hendred, West Hendred, East Lockinge, West Lockinge, and Steventon, in the same County.
Little Somerford Inclosure Act 1808	48 Geo. 3. c. 75 Pr.	30 June 1808
An Act for inclosing Lands in the Manor and Parish of Little Somerford, in the County of Wilts.
Massy's Divorce Act 1808	48 Geo. 3. c. 76 Pr.	30 June 1808
An Act to dissolve the Marriage of the Reverend Charles Massy with Mary Anne Rosslewin his now Wife, and to enable him to marry again, and for other Purposes therein mentioned.
South Cerney Inclosure Act 1808	48 Geo. 3. c. 77 Pr.	4 July 1808 (Note: Start of session)
An Act for inclosing Lands in the Parish of South Cerney, in the County of Gloucester.

=== Sources ===
- The Statutes of the United Kingdom. Vol. 47: 48 George III. London: Joseph Butterworth. 1808 – via Internet Archive.
- The Statutes of the United Kingdom. Vol. 47: 48 George III. London: Joseph Butterworth. 1808 – via Google Books.
- Journal of the House of Commons. Vol. 63. London: His Majesty's Stationery Office. pp. 3–481 – via Google Books.
- Chronological Table of and Index to the Statutes. Vol. 1: To the End of the Session 59 Vict. Sess. 2 (1895) (13th ed.). London: Her Majesty's Stationery Office. 1896. pp. 188–191 – via Google Books.
- "Statutes of the United Kingdom of Great Britain and Ireland, 1808". Irish Statute Book. Office of the Attorney General, Government of Ireland.

== See also ==
- List of acts of the Parliament of the United Kingdom
