= Hackney Carriages Act 1815 =

Act of the Parliament of the United Kingdom

- Act of Parliament
- Parliament of the United Kingdom
- Long title: An act to amend several Acts relating to Hackney Coaches; for authorizing the licensing of an additional Number of Hackney Chariots; and for licensing Carriages drawn by One Horse.
- Citation: 55 Geo. 3. c. 159
- Territorial extent: United Kingdom

Dates
- Royal assent: 11 July 1815
- Commencement: 11 July 1815 (Note: Section 1.)
- Repealed: 5 January 1832
Other legislation
Amends	Hackney Coach Fares Act 1808; Hackney Coaches Act 1814
Repealed by	London Hackney Carriage Act 1831

Status: Repealed

Text of statute as originally enacted

The Hackney Carriages Act 1815 (55 Geo. 3. c. 159) was an act of the Parliament of the United Kingdom that amended the law related to hackney carriages.

== Provisions ==
=== Repealed enactments ===
Section 1 of the act repealed so much of the Hackney Coaches Act 1814 (54 Geo. 3. c. 147) "as relates to the providing of Ticked, in the said Act mentioned, or delivering any Such Tickets to Persons paying Fares, or as prohibits Complaints unless Tickets are produced, or accounting for any such Tickets, and all Provisions, Regulations, Penalties and Forfeitures in the said Act contained, in relation to such Tickets".

== Subsequent developments ==
The whole act was repealed by the London Hackney Carriage Act 1831 (1 & 2 Will. 4. c 22), which came into force on 5 January 1832.
