= List of acts of the 4th session of the 18th Parliament of Great Britain =

This is a complete list of acts of the 4th session of the 18th Parliament of the United Kingdom which had regnal year 39 & 40 Geo. 3. This session met from 29 October 1795 until 19 May 1796.

For acts passed until 1707, see the list of acts of the Parliament of England and the list of acts of the Parliament of Scotland. See also the list of acts of the Parliament of Ireland.

For acts passed from 1801 onwards, see the list of acts of the Parliament of the United Kingdom. For acts of the devolved parliaments and assemblies in the United Kingdom, see the list of acts of the Scottish Parliament, the list of acts of the Northern Ireland Assembly, and the list of acts and measures of Senedd Cymru; see also the list of acts of the Parliament of Northern Ireland.

The number shown after each act's title is its chapter number. Acts are cited using this number, preceded by the year(s) of the reign during which the relevant parliamentary session was held; thus the Union with Ireland Act 1800 is cited as "39 & 40 Geo. 3. c. 67", meaning the 67th act passed during the session that started in the 39th year of the reign of George III and which finished in the 40th year of that reign. Note that the modern convention is to use Arabic numerals in citations (thus "41 Geo. 3" rather than "41 Geo. III"). Acts of the last session of the Parliament of Great Britain and the first session of the Parliament of the United Kingdom are both cited as "41 Geo. 3".

Acts passed by the Parliament of Great Britain did not have a short title; however, some of these acts have subsequently been given a short title by acts of the Parliament of the United Kingdom (such as the Short Titles Act 1896).

== 1799 ==
The fourth session of the 18th Parliament of Great Britain, which met from 24 September 1799 until 29 July 1800.

=== Public general acts ===
Short title	Citation	Royal assent
Long title
Militia (No. 5) Act 1799 (repealed)	39 & 40 Geo. 3. c. 1	8 October 1799
An Act for enabling His Majesty to accept the Services of an additional Number of Volunteers from the Militia, under certain Restrictions. (Repealed by Militia Act 1802 (42 Geo. 3. c. 90)))
Duties upon Malt, etc. Act 1799 (repealed)	39 & 40 Geo. 3. c. 2	12 October 1799
An Act for continuing and granting to his Majesty certain Duties upon Malt, Mum, Cyder, and Perry, for the Service of the Year on thousand eight hundred. (Repealed by Statute Law Revision Act 1871 (34 & 35 Vict. c. 116))
Duties on Pensions, etc. Act 1799 (repealed)	39 & 40 Geo. 3. c. 3	12 October 1799
An Act for continuing and granting to his Majesty a Duty on Pensions, Offices, and Personal Estates, in England, Wales, and the Town of Berwick-upon-Tweed, and certain Duties on Sugar, Malt, Tobacco, and Snuff, for the Service of the Year one thousand eight hundred. (Repealed by Statute Law Revision Act 1871 (34 & 35 Vict. c. 116))
Loans or Exchequer Bills Act 1799 (repealed)	39 & 40 Geo. 3. c. 4	12 October 1799
An Act for raising a certain Sum of Money, by Loans or Exchequer Bills, for the Service of the Year one thousand eight hundred; and for permitting Exchequer Bills, issued under an Act of the last Session of Parliament, (Note: Appropriation Act 1799 (39 Geo. 3. c. 114)) for granting to his Majesty a certain Sum of Money out of the Consolidated Fund, and for other Purposes, if not paid by a certain Day, to be received in Payment of any of the Branches of the Publick Revenue. (Repealed by Statute Law Revision Act 1871 (34 & 35 Vict. c. 116))
Loans for Relief of Certain Merchants Act 1799 (repealed)	39 & 40 Geo. 3. c. 5	12 October 1799
An Act for enabling his Majesty to direct the Issue of Exchequer Bills to a Limited Amount and in the Manner therein mentioned, for the Relief of the Merchants of Liverpool and Lancaster. (Repealed by Statute Law Revision Act 1871 (34 & 35 Vict. c. 116))
Exchequer Bills Act 1799 (repealed)	39 & 40 Geo. 3. c. 6	12 October 1799
An Act to enable the Lords Commissioners of His Majesty's Treasury to issue Exchequer Bills to a limited Amount, on the Credit of such Monies as may arise by virtue of an Act of the thirty-eighth Year of His present Majesty's Reign, (Note: Customs, etc. Act 1798 (38 Geo. 3. c. 76)) for granting certain additional Duties of Customs on Goods exported and imported, and on Tonnage of Ships entering Outwards or Inwards to or from Foreign Parts, until the signing the preliminary Articles of Peace; and upon an Act of last Session of Parliament for granting certain Duties upon Income. (Repealed by Statute Law Revision Act 1871 (34 & 35 Vict. c. 116))
Distillation from Wheat, etc. Act 1799 (repealed)	39 & 40 Geo. 3. c. 7	12 October 1799
An Act to prohibit, until the first Day of March one thousand eight hundred, the making of Low Wines or Spirits from Wheat, Barley, Malt, or other Sort of Grain, or from any Meal, Flour, or any Bran, in that Part of Great Britain called Scotland. (Repealed by Statute Law Revision Act 1871 (34 & 35 Vict. c. 116))
Duties on Spirits Act 1799 (repealed)	39 & 40 Geo. 3. c. 8	12 October 1799
An Act for reducing, until the first Day of June one thousand eight hundred, the Duties upon Spirits distilled from Melasses or Sugar, or any Mixture therewith; for prohibiting the Distillation of Spirits from Wheat or Wheat Flour; and for reducing, until the twentieth Day of September one thousand eight hundred, and better collecting the Duties payable on the Importation of Starch. (Repealed by Statute Law Revision Act 1871 (34 & 35 Vict. c. 116))
Continuance of Laws Act 1799 (repealed)	39 & 40 Geo. 3. c. 9	12 October 1799
An Act to continue, until the twentieth Day of February one thousand eight hundred, several Laws relating to the Prevention and Punishment of Attempts to seduce Persons serving in his Majesty's Forces; to the empowering his Majesty to accept the Services of such Parts of the Militia of this Kingdom as may offer to serve in Ireland; to the Admission of certain Articles of Merchandize in neutral Ships, and the issuing of Orders in Council for that Purpose; to the authorizing his Majesty to make Regulations respecting the Trade to the Cape of Good Hope; to the establishing Courts of Judicature in the Island of Newfoundland; to the enabling his Majesty to permit Goods to be imported into this Kingdom in neutral Ships; and to continue, until the thirtieth Day of September one thousand eight hundred, an Act of the last Session of Parliament, (Note: Importation (No. 3) Act 1799 (39 Geo. 3. c. 87)) for enabling his Majesty to prohibit the Exportation, and permit the Importation of Corn, and for allowing the Importation of other Articles of Provision, without Payment of Duty. (Repealed by Statute Law Revision Act 1871 (34 & 35 Vict. c. 116))
Land Tax Redemption (No. 5) Act 1799 (repealed)	39 & 40 Geo. 3. c. 10	12 October 1799
An Act to extend the Period, limited by an Act of the last Session of Parliament, (Note: Land Tax Redemption (No. 4) Act 1799 (39 Geo. 3. c. 108)) for the Benefit of Preference to certain Bodies, Companies, and Persons, in contracting for the Redemption of Land Tax, until the twenty-fifth Day of March one thousand eight hundred. (Repealed by Statute Law Revision Act 1871 (34 & 35 Vict. c. 116))
Appropriation of Certain Duties Act 1799 (repealed)	39 & 40 Geo. 3. c. 11	12 October 1799
An Act to amend so much of an Act, made in the last Session of Parliament, (Note: Duties on Income Act 1799 (39 Geo. 3. c. 13)) for granting certain Duties upon Income, as relates to the Appropriation of the said Duties and of the Duties upon Goods imported and exported, granted by an Act of the thirty-eighth Year of the Reign of his present Majesty. (Note: Taxation Act 1798 (38 Geo. 3. c. 16)) (Repealed by Statute Law Revision Act 1861 (24 & 25 Vict. c. 101))
Duties and Drawbacks Act 1799 (repealed)	39 & 40 Geo. 3. c. 12	12 October 1799
An Act to enable the Commissioners of the Customs to allow, until the first Day of April one thousand eight hundred, British Plantation Sugars to be warehoused; to revive so much of an Act, made in the thirty-second Year of the Reign of his present Majesty, (Note: Customs (No. 2) Act 1792 (32 Geo. 3. c. 43)) as relates to the ascertaining the average Price of Sugar, and regulating the Allowance of Drawback on the Exportation thereof; and for allowing, until the fifth Day of May one thousand eight hundred, certain Drawbacks on Sugar exported. (Repealed by Statute Law Revision Act 1871 (34 & 35 Vict. c. 116))
Loans to Grenada and Saint Vincent Traders Act 1799 (repealed)	39 & 40 Geo. 3. c. 13	12 October 1799
An Act for allowing further Time for the Payment of Instalments on certain Sums of Money advanced by way of Loan to several Persons connected with and trading to the Inlands of Grenada and Saint Vincent. (Repealed by Statute Law Revision Act 1871 (34 & 35 Vict. c. 116))
Meeting of Parliament Act 1799	39 & 40 Geo. 3. c. 14	12 October 1799
An Act for empowering his Majesty to shorten the Time for the Meeting of Parliament in cases of Adjournment.

=== Sources ===
- "Anno 39° and 40° Georgii III". The Statutes at Large: From Magna Carta, to the End of the Last Parliament. Eyre and Strahan. 1800. pp. 264–286 – via Google Books.
- Journals of the House of Commons. Vol. 55. London: His Majesty's Stationery Office. 1803. pp. 3–793 – via Google Books.
- Chronological Table of and Index to the Statutes. Vol. 1: To the End of the Session 59 Vict. Sess. 2 (1895) (13th ed.). London: Her Majesty's Stationery Office. 1896. p. 166-168 – via Google Books.
- "Acts of the Parliament of Great Britain from 1799". legislation.gov.uk. The National Archives.

== 1800 ==
Continuing the fourth session of the 18th Parliament of Great Britain, which met from 24 September 1799 until 29 July 1800.

This session was also traditionally cited as 39 & 40 G. 3.

=== Public general acts ===
Short title	Citation	Royal assent
Long title
Militia Act 1800 (repealed)	39 & 40 Geo. 3. c. 15	19 February 1800
An Act for continuing, until the Expiration of six Weeks after the Commencement of the next Session of Parliament, an Act, made in the thirty-eighth Year of the Reign of His present Majesty, intituled, "An Act for empowering his Majesty for a Time, and to an Extent to be limited, to accept the Services of such Parts of his Militia Forces in this Kingdom as may voluntarily offer themselves to be employed in Ireland." (Note: Militia (No. 4) Act 1798 (38 Geo. 3. c. 66)) (Repealed by Statute Law Revision Act 1871 (34 & 35 Vict. c. 116))
Army and Navy Act 1800 (repealed)	39 & 40 Geo. 3. c. 16	19 February 1800
An Act for continuing, until the Expiration of Six Weeks after the Commencement of the next Session of Parliament, an Act, made in the thirty-seventh Year of the Reign of his present Majesty, intituled, "An Act for the better Prevention and Punishment of Attempts to seduce Persons serving in his Majesty's Forces, by Sea or Land, from their Duty and Allegiance to his Majesty, or to incite them to Mutiny or Disobedience." (Note: Incitement to Mutiny Act 1797 (37 Geo. 3. c. 70)) (Repealed by Statute Law Revision Act 1871 (34 & 35 Vict. c. 116))
Continuance of Laws Act 1800 (repealed)	39 & 40 Geo. 3. c. 17	19 February 1800
An Act to continue, until the first Day of March one thousand eight hundred and three, an Act made in the thirty-third Year of the Reign of his present Majesty, (Note: Courts (Newfoundland) Act 1793 (33 Geo. 3. c. 76)) for establishing Courts of Judicature in the Island of Newfoundland; and to continue until the Expiration of forty Days after the Commencement of the next Session of Parliament, several Laws relating to the Admission of certain Articles of Merchandize in neutral Ships, and the issuing of Orders in Council for that Purpose; to the authorizing his Majesty to make Regulations respecting the Trade to the Cape of Good Hope; and to the enabling his Majesty to permit Goods to be imported into this Kingdom in neutral Ships. (Repealed by Statute Law Revision Act 1871 (34 & 35 Vict. c. 116))
Sale of Bread Act 1800 (repealed)	39 & 40 Geo. 3. c. 18	20 February 1800
An Act to prohibit, until the Expiration of Six Weeks after the Commencement of the next Session of Parliament, any Person or Persons from selling any Bread which shall not have been baked a certain Time. (Repealed by Statute Law Revision Act 1871 (34 & 35 Vict. c. 116))
Indemnity Act 1800 (repealed)	39 & 40 Geo. 3. c. 19	20 February 1800
An Act to indemnify such Persons as have omitted to qualify themselves for Offices and Employments; and to indemnify Justices of the Peace, or others, who have omitted to register or deliver in their Qualifications within the time directed by Law, and for extending the Time limited for those Purposes, until the twenty-fifth Day of December one thousand eight hundred; to indemnify Members and Officers, in Cities, Corporations. and Borough Towns, whose Admissions have been omitted to be stamped according to Law, or having been stamped, have been lost or mislaid, and for allowing them, until the twenty-fifth Day of December one thousand eight hundred, to provide Admissions duly stamped; to permit such Persons as have omitted to make and file Affidavits of the Execution of Indentures of Clerks to Attornies and Solicitors, to make and file the same on or before the first Day of Michaelmas Term one thousand eight hundred; and for indemnifying Deputy Lieutenants and Officers of the Militia, who have neglected to transmit Descriptions of their Qualifications to the Clerks of the Peace within the Time directed by Law, and for extending the Time limited for that Purpose, until the first Day of September one thousand eight hundred. (Repealed by Promissory Oaths Act 1871 (34 & 35 Vict. c. 48))
Habeas Corpus Suspension Act 1800 (repealed)	39 & 40 Geo. 3. c. 20	28 February 1800
An Act for further continuing, until the First Day of February one thousand eight hundred and one, an Act, made in the last Session of Parliament, (Note: Habeas Corpus Suspension Act 1799 (39 Geo. 3. c. 15)) intituled, "An Act for further continuing, until the first Day of March one thousand eight hundred, an Act made in the last Session of Parliament, (Note: Habeas Corpus Suspension Act 1798 (38 Geo. 3. c. 36)) intituled, 'An Act to empower his Majesty to secure and detain such Persons as his Majesty shall suspect are conspiring against his Person and Government.'" (Repealed by Statute Law Revision Act 1871 (34 & 35 Vict. c. 116))
Distillation From Wheat, etc. Act 1800 (repealed)	39 & 40 Geo. 3. c. 21	28 February 1800
An Act to continue, until the first Day February one thousand eight hundred and one, an Act, made in this present Session of Parliament, (Note: Distillation from Wheat, etc. Act 1799 (39 & 40 Geo. 3. c. 7)) to prohibit the making of low Wines or Spirits from Wheat, or other Sort of Grain, or from Meal, Flour, or Bran, in that Part of Great Britain called Scotland. (Repealed by Statute Law Revision Act 1871 (34 & 35 Vict. c. 116))
National Debt Act 1800 (repealed)	39 & 40 Geo. 3. c. 22	10 March 1800
An Act for raising the Sum of twenty millions five hundred thousand Pounds by way of Annuities. (Repealed by Statute Law Revision Act 1870 (33 & 34 Vict. c. 69))
Excise Act 1800 (repealed)	39 & 40 Geo. 3. c. 23	10 March 1800
An Act for granting to his Majesty additional Duties of Excise on British and Foreign Spirits, and Tea. (Repealed by Statute Law Revision Act 1861 (24 & 25 Vict. c. 101))
Marine Mutiny Act 1800 (repealed)	39 & 40 Geo. 3. c. 24	10 March 1800
An Act for the Regulation of his Majesty's Marine Forces while on Shore. (Repealed by Statute Law Revision Act 1871 (34 & 35 Vict. c. 116))
Use of Wheat in Making Starch Act 1800 (repealed)	39 & 40 Geo. 3. c. 25	25 March 1800
An Act to prohibit, until the first Day of October one thousand eight hundred, the Use of Wheat in making Starch. (Repealed by Statute Law Revision Act 1871 (34 & 35 Vict. c. 116))
National Debt (No. 2) Act 1800 (repealed)	39 & 40 Geo. 3. c. 26	25 March 1800
An Act for granting to his Majesty the Sum of two hundred thousand Pounds, to be issued and paid to the Governor and Company of the Bank of England, to be by them placed to the Account of the Commissioners for the Reduction of the National Debt. (Repealed by Statute Law Revision Act 1861 (24 & 25 Vict. c. 101))
Mutiny Act 1800 (repealed)	39 & 40 Geo. 3. c. 27	25 March 1800
An Act for punishing Mutiny and Desertion; and for the better Payment of the Army and their Quarters. (Repealed by Statute Law Revision Act 1871 (34 & 35 Vict. c. 116))
Bank of England Act 1800 (repealed)	39 & 40 Geo. 3. c. 28	4 April 1800
An Act for establishing an Agreement with the Governor and Company of the Bank of England, for Advancing the Sum of three millions, towards the Supply for the Service of the Year one thousand eight hundred. (Repealed by Statute Law (Repeals) Act 1973 (c. 39))
Bounties on Importation Act 1800 (repealed)	39 & 40 Geo. 3. c. 29	4 April 1800
An Act for granting Bounties on the Importation of Wheat, Wheaten Flour, and Rice, until the first Day of October one thousand eight hundred. (Repealed by Statute Law Revision Act 1871 (34 & 35 Vict. c. 116))
Land Tax Redemption Act 1800 (repealed)	39 & 40 Geo. 3. c. 30	4 April 1800
An Act for extending, from the twenty-fifth Day of March one thousand eight hundred, until the twenty-fifth Day of March one thousand eight hundred and one, the Period of Preference granted and continued by several Acts to Bodies Corporate and Persons for the Redemption of Land Tax; and for enlarging several of the Powers contained in the said Acts. (Repealed by Land Tax Redemption Act 1802 (42 Geo. 3. c. 116))
Duty on Pensions, etc. Act 1800 (repealed)	39 & 40 Geo. 3. c. 31	24 April 1800
An Act for appointing Commissioners to put in Execution an Act of this Session of Parliament, intituled, "An Act for continuing and granting to His Majesty a Duty on Pensions, Offices, and Personal Estates, in England, Wales, and the Town of Berwick-upon-Tweed, and certain Duties on Sugar, Malt, Tobacco, and Snuff, for the Service of the Year one thousand eight hundred, together with those named in two former Acts for appointing Commissioners of the Land Tax." (Note: Duties on Pensions, etc. Act 1799 (39 & 40 Geo. 3. c. 3)) (Repealed by Statute Law Revision Act 1871 (34 & 35 Vict. c. 116))
Duties on Hair Powder, etc. Act 1800 (repealed)	39 & 40 Geo. 3. c. 32	24 April 1800
An Act for indemnifying Persons serving in Volunteer Corps, who have omitted to take out Certificates for wearing Hair Powder; and to amend so much of an Act made in the thirty-fifth Year of the Reign of His present Majesty, intituled, "An Act for granting to His Majesty a Duty on Certificates issued for using Hair Powder," (Note: Duty on Hair Powder Act 1795 (35 Geo. 3. c. 49)) as relates to the exempting Persons serving in Volunteer Corps, and certain Officers in his Majesty's Navy serving on the Establishment of the Royal Hospital at Greenwich, from the said Duty; and for obliging Persons claiming to be exempt from the Duties on Horses provided and furnished for Volunteer Corps to deliver Certificates thereof to the proper Officers. (Repealed by Statute Law Revision Act 1861 (24 & 25 Vict. c. 101))
Exchequer Bills (No. 1) Act 1800 (repealed)	39 & 40 Geo. 3. c. 33	1 May 1800
An Act to enable the Lords Commissioners of his Majesty's Treasury to issue Exchequer Bills, to a limited Amount, on the Credit of such Aids or Supplies as have been or shall be granted by Parliament, for the Service of the Year one thousand eight hundred; and to enable the Governor and Company of the Bank of England to advance Cash or Bullion, to be remitted abroad on Account of Foreign Subsidies or Services abroad. (Repealed by Statute Law Revision Act 1871 (34 & 35 Vict. c. 116))
Neutral Ships Act 1800 (repealed)	39 & 40 Geo. 3. c. 34	1 May 1800
An Act to permit the Importation of Goods and Commodities from Countries in America, belonging to any Foreign European Sovereign or State, in neutral Ships, until the twenty-ninth Day of September one thousand eight hundred and one. (Repealed by Statute Law Revision Act 1871 (34 & 35 Vict. c. 116))
Bounty on Importation Act 1800 (repealed)	39 & 40 Geo. 3. c. 35	1 May 1800
An Act for granting a Bounty on the Importation of Oats, until the first Day of October one thousand eight hundred. (Repealed by Statute Law Revision Act 1871 (34 & 35 Vict. c. 116))
Transfer of Stock Act 1800 (repealed)	39 & 40 Geo. 3. c. 36	1 May 1800
An Act to enable Courts of Equity to compel a Transfer of Stock in Suits, without making the Governor and Company of the Bank of England, or the United Company of Merchants of England trading to the East Indies, or the Governor and Company of Merchants of Great Britain trading to the South Seas or other Parts of America, Party thereto. (Repealed by Supreme Court Act 1981 (c. 54))
Militia Pay Act 1800 (repealed)	39 & 40 Geo. 3. c. 37	16 May 1800
An Act for defraying the Charge of the Pay and Cloathing of the Militia in that Part of Great Britain called England, for one Year from the twenty-fifth Day of March one thousand eight hundred. (Repealed by Statute Law Revision Act 1871 (34 & 35 Vict. c. 116))
Saltpetre Act 1800 (repealed)	39 & 40 Geo. 3. c. 38	16 May 1800
An Act for repealing so much of an Act, made in the last Session of Parliament, intituled, "An Act for permitting certain Goods imported from the East Indies to be warehoused, and for repealing the Duties now payable thereon, and granting other Duties in lieu thereof;" (Note: Warehousing of Goods Act 1799 (39 Geo. 3. c. 59)) as relates to Saltpetre. (Repealed by Statute Law Revision Act 1871 (34 & 35 Vict. c. 116))
Quartering of Soldiers Act 1800 (repealed)	39 & 40 Geo. 3. c. 39	16 May 1800
An Act for increasing the Rates of Subsistence to be paid to Innkeepers and others on quartering Soldiers. (Repealed by Statute Law Revision Act 1871 (34 & 35 Vict. c. 116))
Poor Act 1800 (repealed)	39 & 40 Geo. 3. c. 40	16 May 1800
An Act to enlarge the Powers of the Directors and Guardians of the Poor within the several Hundreds, Towns, and Districts, in that Part of Great Britain called England, incorporated by divers Acts of Parliament, for the Purpose of the better Maintenance and Employment of the Poor, as to the Assessments to be made upon the several Parishes, Hamlets, and Places therein mentioned, until the first Day of January one thousand eight hundred and two. (Repealed by Statute Law Revision Act 1871 (34 & 35 Vict. c. 116))
Ecclesiastical Leases Act 1800 (repealed)	39 & 40 Geo. 3. c. 41	16 May 1800
An Act for explaining and amending several Acts, made in the thirty-second Year of King Henry the Eighth, (Note: Leases Act 1540 (32 Hen. 8. c. 28)) and the first, (Note: Alienation by Bishops Act 1558 (1 Eliz. 1. c. 19)) thirteenth, (Note: Ecclesiastical Leases Act 1571 (13 Eliz. 1. c. 10)) and fourteenth (Note: Ecclesiastical Leases Act 1572 (14 Eliz. 1. c. 11)) Years of the Reign of Queen Elizabeth, so far as respects Leases granted by Archbishops, Bishops, Masters and Fellows of Colleges, Deans and Chapters of Cathedral and Collegiate Churches, Masters and Guardians of Hospitals, and others having any Spiritual or Ecclesiastical Living or Promotion. (Repealed by Statute Law (Repeals) Act 1998 (c. 43))
Bill of Exchange Act 1800 (repealed)	39 & 40 Geo. 3. c. 42	16 May 1800
An Act for the better Observance of Good Friday in certain Cases therein mentioned. (Repealed by Bills of Exchange Act 1882 (45 & 46 Vict. c. 61))
Duke of Richmond's Annuity Act 1800 (repealed)	39 & 40 Geo. 3. c. 43	30 May 1800
An Act to confirm an Agreement entered into between the Commissioners of his Majesty's Treasury and the Most Noble Charles Duke of Richmond, in pursuance of an Act passed in the thirty-ninth Year of the Reign of his present Majesty, intituled, "An Act to enable the Commissioners of the Treasury to contract with the Most Noble Charles Duke of Richmond, for the absolute Purchase of the Property of the said Duke, and of all others interested, in a certain Duty of twelve Pence per Chaldron on Coals shipped in the River Tyne to be consumed in England, and to grant a Compensation for the same, by way of Annuity, payable out of the Consolidated Fund." (Note: Annuity (Heirs of Sir Thomas Clarges) Act 1799 (39 Geo. 3. c. 84)) (Repealed by Statute Law Revision Act 1948 (11 & 12 Geo. 6. c. 62))
Militia Allowances Act 1800 (repealed)	39 & 40 Geo. 3. c. 44	30 May 1800
An Act for granting, until the twenty-fifth Day of March one thousand eight hundred and one, certain Allowances to Adjutants, Serjeant Majors, and Serjeants of Militia, disembodied under an Act of this Session of Parliament, intituled, "An Act for enabling his Majesty to accept the Services of an additional Number of Volunteers from the Militia, under certain Restrictions." (Note: Militia Act 1799 (39 & 40 Geo. 3. c. 1)) (Repealed by Statute Law Revision Act 1861 (24 & 25 Vict. c. 101))
Duties on Glass, etc. Act 1800 (repealed)	39 & 40 Geo. 3. c. 45	30 May 1800
An Act for making perpetual so much of an Act, made in the thirty-fifth Year of the Reign of his present Majesty, (Note: Duties on Glass Act 1795 (35 Geo. 3. c. 114)) for better securing the Duties on Glass, as was to continue in force for a limited Time; and to continue several Laws relating to the granting a Bounty upon certain Species of British and Irish Linens exported, and taking off the Duties on the Importation of Foreign Raw Linen Yarns made of Flax, until the twenty fourth Day of June one thousand eight hundred and one; to the better Encouragement of the making of Sail Cloth in Great Britain, to the encouraging the Manufacture of British Sail Cloth, and securing the Duties on Foreign-made Sail Cloth imported, to the securing the Duties upon Foreign-made Sail Cloth, and Charging Foreign-made Sails with a Duty, until the twenty-ninth Day of September one thousand eight hundred and four, and from thence to the End of the then next Session of Parliament; to the regulating the Fees of the Officers of the Customs, and of the Naval Officers in the British Colonies in America, and of the Officers of the Customs in the Island of Newfoundland, until the ninth Day of May one thousand eight hundred and four, and from thence to the End of the then next Session of Parliament; to the landing Rum or Spirits of the British Sugar Plantations, before Payment of the Duties of Excise, until the twenty-ninth Day of September one thousand eight hundred and five, and from thence to the End of the then next Session of Parliament; to the encouraging the Fisheries carried on at Newfoundland and Parts adjacent, from Great Britain, Ireland, and the British Dominions in Europe, until the first Day of January one thousand eight hundred and two; and to the further Support and Encouragement of the Fisheries carried on in the Greenland Seas and Davis's Straits, until the twenty fifth Day of December one thousand eight hundred and one. (Repealed by Statute Law Revision Act 1861 (24 & 25 Vict. c. 101))
Small Debts (Scotland) Act 1800 (repealed)	39 & 40 Geo. 3. c. 46	30 May 1800
An Act for the more easy and expeditious Recovery of Small Debts, and determining Small Causes in that Part of Great Britain called Scotland. (Repealed by Justices of the Peace Small Debt (Scotland) Act 1825 (6 Geo. 4. c. 48))
London Hackney Carriage Act 1800 (repealed)	39 & 40 Geo. 3. c. 47	30 May 1800
An Act for repealing the Rates and Fares taken by Licenced Hackney Coachmen, and for establishing other Rates and Fares in lieu thereof; and for explaining and amending several Laws relating to Hackney Coaches and Chairs. (Repealed by London Hackney Carriage Act 1831 (1 & 2 Will. 4. c. 22))
Duties on Sugar, etc. Act 1800 (repealed)	39 & 40 Geo. 3. c. 48	30 May 1800
An Act to repeal the Duties on Sugar and Coffee exported, granted by an Act, passed in the thirty-ninth Year of his present Majesty's Reign, (Note: Duties on Sugar, etc. Act 1799 (39 Geo. 3. c. 63)) for allowing British Plantation Sugar to be warehoused; for reviving so much of an Act, made in the thirty-second Year of the Reign of his present Majesty, (Note: Customs (No. 2) Act 1792 (32 Geo. 3. c. 43)) as relates to the ascertaining the average Price of Sugar, and regulating the Allowance of Drawback on the Exportation thereof; and for allowing certain Drawbacks on Sugar exported, until the tenth Day of May one thousand eight hundred and one. (Repealed by Statute Law Revision Act 1871 (34 & 35 Vict. c. 116))
Duties on Income Act 1800 (repealed)	39 & 40 Geo. 3. c. 49	20 June 1800
An Act for the better ascertaining and collecting the Duties granted by several Acts passed in the last Session of Parliament, relating to the Duties on Income; and to explain and amend the said Acts. (Repealed by Statute Law Revision Act 1861 (24 & 25 Vict. c. 101))
Night Poaching Act 1800 (repealed)	39 & 40 Geo. 3. c. 50	20 June 1800
An Act to extend the Provisions of an Act made in the Seventeenth Year of the Reign of King George the Second, intituled, "An Act to amend and make more effectual the Laws relating to Rogues, Vagabonds, and other idle and disorderly Persons, and to Houses of Correction." (Note: Justices Commitment Act 1743 (17 Geo. 2. c. 5)) (Repealed by Night Poaching Act 1817 (57 Geo. 3. c. 90))
Customs Act 1800 (repealed)	39 & 40 Geo. 3. c. 51	20 June 1800
An Act to permit Blubber from the Greenland Fishery and Davis's Streights to be boiled into Oil after the Arrival of the Ships from the Fishery, and for charging the Duty thereon; for altering the Convoy Duty now payable on the Importation of Opium; for repealing the Duties on the Importation of Oil of Turpentine and Tar, and charging other Duties in lieu thereof; for exempting Burr Stones, and Stones used for the Purpose of paving or the making or mending of Roads, from the Duties charged thereon when carried Coastwise; for obliging Masters of Ships laden with Tobacco to remove the same from their Moorings when their Cargoes are discharged; and for extending Bonds given on licensing Ships, Vessels, or Boats, to all Cases wherein Ships, Vessels, or Boats may be liable to Forfeiture. (Repealed by Customs Law Repeal Act 1825 (6 Geo. 4. c. 105))
Lottery Act 1800 (repealed)	39 & 40 Geo. 3. c. 52	20 June 1800
An Act for granting to his Majesty a certain Sum of Money, to be raised by a Lottery. (Repealed by Statute Law Revision Act 1871 (34 & 35 Vict. c. 116))
Bounty on Rye Act 1800 (repealed)	39 & 40 Geo. 3. c. 53	20 June 1800
An Act for granting a Bounty on the Importation of Rye, until the fifteenth Day of October one thousand eight hundred. (Repealed by Statute Law Revision Act 1871 (34 & 35 Vict. c. 116))
Public Accountants Act 1800 (repealed)	39 & 40 Geo. 3. c. 54	20 June 1800
An Act for more effectually charging Publick Accountants with the Payment of Interest; for allowing Interest to them in certain Cases; and for compelling the Payment of Balances due from them. (Repealed by Statute Law Revision Act 1948 (11 & 12 Geo. 6. c. 62))
Salaries of Scotch Judges Act 1800 (repealed)	39 & 40 Geo. 3. c. 55	20 June 1800
An Act to amend so much of an Act, made in the last Session of Parliament, (Note: Judges' Pensions Act 1799 (39 Geo. 3. c. 110)) for the Augmentation of the Salaries of the Judges of the Courts in Westminster Hall, and also of the Lords of Session, Lords Commissioners of Justiciary, and Barons of Exchequer in Scotland, as relates to the Salaries of the Judges of the Courts of Session, Justiciary, and Exchequer in Scotland. (Repealed by Statute Law Revision Act 1861 (24 & 25 Vict. c. 101))
Entailed Estates Act 1800 (repealed)	39 & 40 Geo. 3. c. 56	20 June 1800
An Act for Relief of Persons entitled to entailed Estates to be purchased with Trust Monies. (Repealed by Entailed Estates Act 1826 (7 Geo. 4. c. 45))
Harbour of Leith Act 1800 (repealed)	39 & 40 Geo. 3. c. 57	20 June 1800
An Act for enabling the Barons of the Court of Exchequer in Scotland to advance to the Lord Provost and Magistrates of the City of Edinburgh, for the Purpose of completing the Improvements of the Harbour of Leith, a certain Sum, being Part of the Money which by an Act of the last Session of Parliament (Note: Forth and Clyde Navigation Company and Crinan Canal Company Act 1799 (39 Geo. 3 c. lxxi)) was directed to be paid into the said Court of Exchequer by the Proprietors of the Forth and Clyde Navigation. (Repealed by Statute Law Revision Act 1871 (34 & 35 Vict. c. 116))
Importation and Exportation Act 1800 (repealed)	39 & 40 Geo. 3. c. 58	30 June 1800
An Act for further continuing and amending an Act, made in the last Session of Parliament, (Note: Importation (No. 3) Act 1799 (39 Geo. 3. c. 87)) for enabling his Majesty to prohibit the Exportation and permit the Importation of Corn; and for allowing the Importation of other Articles of Provision without Payment of Duty. (Repealed by Statute Law Revision Act 1871 (34 & 35 Vict. c. 116))
Customs (No. 2) Act 1800 (repealed)	39 & 40 Geo. 3. c. 59	30 June 1800
An Act to remove Doubts arising from the Construction of an Act made in the thirty-ninth Year of His present Majesty's Reign, intituled, "An Act for permitting certain Goods imported from the East Indies to be warehoused, and for repealing the Duties now payable thereon, and granting other Duties in lieu thereof." (Repealed by Customs Law Repeal Act 1825 (6 Geo. 4. c. 105))
Customs (No. 3) Act 1800 (repealed)	39 & 40 Geo. 3. c. 60	30 June 1800
An Act to Lessen the Duties on Wine and Spirits the Produce of the British Settlement of the Cape of Good Hope; and to empower the Importers to land the same before Payment of the Duties of Excise, and to lodge the same in Warehouses; and to allow the same to be shipped free of Duty as Stores, to be consumed on board Merchants' Ships on their Voyages. (Repealed by Statute Law Revision Act 1861 (24 & 25 Vict. c. 101))
Duties on Wash Made from Sugar Act 1800 (repealed)	39 & 40 Geo. 3. c. 61	30 June 1800
An Act to revive and continue, until the first Day of July one thousand eight hundred and one, such Part of an Act, made in the present Session of Parliament, (Note: Duties on Spirits Act 1799 (39 & 40 Geo. 3. c. 8)) for reducing the Duties upon Spirits distilled from Melasses or Sugar, or any Mixture therewith, and for other Purposes, as relates to the Duties on Wort or Wash brewed or made from Melasses or Sugar. (Repealed by Statute Law Revision Act 1871 (34 & 35 Vict. c. 116))
Use of Sugar in Brewing Act 1800 (repealed)	39 & 40 Geo. 3. c. 62	30 June 1800
An Act to allow, for nine Months after the passing of the Act, the Use of Sugar in the brewing of Beer. (Repealed by Statute Law Revision Act 1871 (34 & 35 Vict. c. 116))
Duties on Kid Skins Act 1800 (repealed)	39 & 40 Geo. 3. c. 63	30 June 1800
An Act for repealing Part of the Duties and Drawbacks of Customs on Kid Skins imported, and the Exemption of imported Kid Skins from Excise Duty, on being dressed in Great Britain. (Repealed by Statute Law Revision Act 1871 (34 & 35 Vict. c. 116))
Neutral Ships (No. 2) Act 1800 (repealed)	39 & 40 Geo. 3. c. 64	30 June 1800
An Act for permitting the free Importation of Linseed Cakes and Rape Cakes in Neutral Ships. (Repealed by Statute Law Revision Act 1871 (34 & 35 Vict. c. 116))
Neutral Ships (No. 3) Act 1800 (repealed)	39 & 40 Geo. 3. c. 65	30 June 1800
An Act to continue, until the first Day of January one thousand eight hundred and four, several Acts relating to the Admission of certain Articles of Merchandize in Neutral Ships, and to the issuing of Orders in Council for that Purpose. (Repealed by Goods in Neutral Ships Act 1802 (42 Geo. 3. c. 80))
Use of Horse Hides, etc. Act 1800 (repealed)	39 & 40 Geo. 3. c. 66	30 June 1800
An Act to repeal so much of an Act, passed in the second Year of King James the First, (Note: Leather Act 1603 (1 Jas. 1. c. 22)) as prohibits the Use of Horse Hides in making Boots and Shoes; and for better preventing the damaging of Raw Hides and Skins in the flaying thereof. (Repealed by Horse Hides Act 1824 (5 Geo. 4. c. 57))
Union with Ireland Act 1800	39 & 40 Geo. 3. c. 67	2 July 1800
An Act for the Union of Great Britain and Ireland.
Land Tax Act 1800 (repealed)	39 & 40 Geo. 3. c. 68	9 July 1800
An Act for extending the Powers of the Commissioners named in an Act, made in this present Session of Parliament, (Note: Duty on Pensions, etc. Act 1800 (39 & 40 Geo. 3. c. 31)) intituled, "An Act for appointing Commissioners to put in Execution an Act of this Session of Parliament, (Note: Duties on Pensions, etc. Act 1799 (39 & 40 Geo. 3. c. 3)) intituled, 'An Act for continuing and granting to his Majesty a Duty on Pensions, Offices, and Personal Estates, in England, Wales, and the Town of Berwick upon Tweed, and certain Duties on Sugar, Malt, Tobacco, and Snuff, for the Service of the Year one thousand eight hundred,' together with those named in two former Acts for appointing Commissioners of the Land Tax;" for indemnifying such Persons named in the said Act as have acted as Commissioners of the Land Tax; and for rendering valid certain Acts done by them. (Repealed by Statute Law Revision Act 1871 (34 & 35 Vict. c. 116))
Repeal of Certain Duties Act 1800 (repealed)	39 & 40 Geo. 3. c. 69	9 July 1800
An Act for repealing the Duties on Perfumery and on Licences for vending the same. (Repealed by Statute Law Revision Act 1871 (34 & 35 Vict. c. 116))
Paper Duty Act 1800 (repealed)	39 & 40 Geo. 3. c. 70	9 July 1800
An Act to exempt from Duty Waste Paper imported into this Kingdom, for the Purpose of being re-manufactured, except the Duty imposed by an Act of the thirty-eighth Year of the Reign of his present Majesty, (Note: Customs, etc. Act 1798 (38 Geo. 3. c. 76)) for the better Protection of the Trade of this Kingdom, and for granting new and additional Duties of Customs on Goods imported and exported. (Repealed by Statute Law Revision Act 1871 (34 & 35 Vict. c. 116))
Sale of Bread (No. 2) Act 1800 (repealed)	39 & 40 Geo. 3. c. 71	9 July 1800
An Act to authorize Bakers and other Persons to sell Bread to his Majesty's Forces on their March, which shall not have been baked twenty-four Hours, and to indemnify all Persons by whom such Bread may have been so sold. (Repealed by Statute Law Revision Act 1871 (34 & 35 Vict. c. 116))
Administration of Estates (Probate) Act 1800 (repealed)	39 & 40 Geo. 3. c. 72	9 July 1800
An Act to amend several Laws relating to the Duties on stamped Vellum, Parchment, and Paper. (Repealed by Stamp Duties Management Act 1891 (54 & 55 Vict. c. 38))
Duties on Distillation Act 1800 (repealed)	39 & 40 Geo. 3. c. 73	9 July 1800
An Act for repealing the Duties of Excise on Distilleries in Scotland, and on the Exportation of British-made Spirits from England to Scotland, and for granting other Duties in lieu thereof; and for altering, amending, and continuing certain Acts of Parliament for the Regulation of Distilleries in Scotland. (Repealed by Statute Law Revision Act 1861 (24 & 25 Vict. c. 101))
Price and Assise of Bread Act 1800 (repealed)	39 & 40 Geo. 3. c. 74	9 July 1800
An Act for amending several Acts for regulating the Price and Assize of Bread. (Repealed by Statute Law Revision Act 1861 (24 & 25 Vict. c. 101))
Militia Allowances (No. 2) Act 1800 (repealed)	39 & 40 Geo. 3. c. 75	9 July 1800
An Act for making Allowances in certain Cases to Subaltern Officers of the Militia in Time of Peace. (Repealed by Statute Law Revision Act 1871 (34 & 35 Vict. c. 116))
Indemnity (West Indies) Act 1800 (repealed)	39 & 40 Geo. 3. c. 76	9 July 1800
An Act for indemnifying Governors, Lieutenant Governors, and Persons acting as such, in the West India Islands, who have permitted the Importation and Exportation of Goods and Commodities in Foreign Bottoms. (Repealed by Statute Law Revision Act 1871 (34 & 35 Vict. c. 116))
Collieries and Mines Act 1800 (repealed)	39 & 40 Geo. 3. c. 77	9 July 1800
An Act for the Security of Collieries and Mines, and for the better Regulation of Colliers and Miners. (Repealed by Statute Law Revision Act 1948 (11 & 12 Geo. 6. c. 62))
Crown Lands (Forfeited Estates) Act 1800 (repealed)	39 & 40 Geo. 3. c. 78	9 July 1800
An Act to discharge from a disputed and dormant Claim of the Publick, several Estates belonging to the Right Honourable William Car Earl of Errol, Lord High Constable of Scotland. (Repealed by Statute Law Revision Act 1948 (11 & 12 Geo. 6. c. 62))
Government of India Act 1800 (repealed)	39 & 40 Geo. 3. c. 79	28 July 1800
An Act for establishing further Regulations for the Government of the British Territories in India, and the better Administration of Justice within the same. (Repealed by Government of India Act 1915 (5 & 6 Geo. 5. c. 61))
Quarantine Act 1800 (repealed)	39 & 40 Geo. 3. c. 80	28 July 1800
An Act for erecting a Lazaret on Chetney Hill, in the County of Kent; and for reducing into one Act the Laws relating to Quarantine; and for making further Provision therein. (Repealed by Quarantine Act 1805 (45 Geo. 3. c. 10))
Hop Trade Act 1800 (repealed)	39 & 40 Geo. 3. c. 81	28 July 1800
An Act to repeal an Act, made in the fourteenth Year of the Reign of his present Majesty, intituled, "An Act to prevent Frauds in the buying and selling of Hops," (Note: Hops Act 1774 (14 Geo. 3. c. 68)) and for the better Collection of the Duty on Hops; and to prevent Frauds and Abuses in the Trade of Hops. (Repealed by Statute Law (Repeals) Act 1973 (c. 39))
Duties on Foreign Hops Act 1800 (repealed)	39 & 40 Geo. 3. c. 82	28 July 1800
An Act for suspending, until the twentieth Day of August one thousand eight hundred, the Duties on Foreign Hops imported, and for granting other Duties in lieu thereof. (Repealed by Statute Law Revision Act 1871 (34 & 35 Vict. c. 116))
Importation Act 1800 (repealed)	39 & 40 Geo. 3. c. 83	28 July 1800
An Act for permitting French Wines to be imported into this Kingdom from the Isles of Guernsey, Jersey, or Alderney, in Bottles or Flasks. (Repealed by Customs Law Repeal Act 1825 (6 Geo. 4. c. 105))
Stamps Act 1800 (repealed)	39 & 40 Geo. 3. c. 84	28 July 1800
An Act to render valid Indentures of Apprenticeship of Poor Children and others, made upon improper Stamps, upon certain Conditions, and to indemnify all Persons who may have incurred Penalties thereby; and for allowing attested Copies of Indentures, Leases, or Deeds to be stamped after the ingrossing, writing, or printing thereof. (Repealed by Inland Revenue Repeal Act 1870 (33 & 34 Vict. c. 99))
British Fisheries Act 1800 (repealed)	39 & 40 Geo. 3. c. 85	28 July 1800
An Act to continue, until the fifth Day of April one thousand eight hundred and one, and amend, an Act of the last Session of Parliament, (Note: British Fisheries Society Act 1799 (39 Geo. 3. c. 100)) for continuing several Acts for the Encouragement of the British Fisheries. (Repealed by Sea Fisheries Act 1868 (31 & 32 Vict. c. 45))
New Forest Act 1800 (repealed)	39 & 40 Geo. 3. c. 86	28 July 1800
An Act for the better Preservation of Timber in the New Forest in the County of Southampton; and for ascertaining the Boundaries of the said Forest and of the lands of the Crown within the same. (Repealed by Wild Creatures and Forest Laws Act 1971 (c. 47))
Depredations on the Thames Act 1800 or the Thames Police Act 1800 or the Thames River Police Act 1800 or the Marine Police Act 1800 (repealed)	39 & 40 Geo. 3. c. 87	28 July 1800
An Act for the more effectual Prevention of Depredations on the River Thames, and in its Vicinity; and to amend an Act made in the second Year of the Reign of His present Majesty, (Note: Thefts Upon the Thames Act 1762 (2 Geo. 3. c. 28)) to prevent the committing of Thefts and Frauds by Persons navigating Bum Boats, and other Boats upon the River Thames. (Repealed by Statute Law Revision Act 1871 (34 & 35 Vict. c. 116))
Crown Private Estate Act 1800	39 & 40 Geo. 3. c. 88	28 July 1800
An Act concerning the disposition of certain real and personal property of His Majesty, his heirs and successors; and also of the real and personal property of Her Majesty, and of the Queen Consort for the time being.
Embezzlement of Public Stores Act 1800 (repealed)	39 & 40 Geo. 3. c. 89	28 July 1800
An Act for the better preventing the Embezzlement of his Majesty's Naval Ordnance, and Victualling Stores. (Repealed by Public Stores Act 1875 (38 & 39 Vict. c. 25))
Disputes Between Masters and Workmen Act 1800 (repealed)	39 & 40 Geo. 3. c. 90	28 July 1800
An Act for settling Disputes that may arise between Masters and Workmen engaged in the Cotton Manufacture in that Part of Great Britain called England. (Repealed by Masters and Workmen Arbitration Act 1824 (5 Geo. 4. c. 96))
Exportation Act 1800 (repealed)	39 & 40 Geo. 3. c. 91	28 July 1800
An Act to prohibit, until the fifteenth Day of October one thousand eight hundred, the Exportation of Rice. (Repealed by Statute Law Revision Act 1871 (34 & 35 Vict. c. 116))
House of Commons Act 1800 (repealed)	39 & 40 Geo. 3. c. 92	28 July 1800
An Act for establishing certain Regulations in the Offices of the House of Commons. (Repealed by House of Commons (Offices) Act 1812 (52 Geo. 3. c. 11))
Treason Act 1800 (repealed)	39 & 40 Geo. 3. c. 93	28 July 1800
An Act for regulating Trials for High Treason and Misprision of High Treason, in certain Cases. (Repealed by Criminal Justice (Scotland) Act 1980 (c. 62))
Criminal Lunatics Act 1800 (repealed)	39 & 40 Geo. 3. c. 94	28 July 1800
An Act for the safe Custody of Insane Persons charged with Offences. (Repealed by Statute Law (Repeals) Act 1981 (c. 19))
Indemnity to Printers Act 1800 (repealed)	39 & 40 Geo. 3. c. 95	28 July 1800
An Act to indemnify all Persons who have printed, published, or dispersed, or who shall publish or disperse, any Papers printed under the Authority of the Commissioners or Head Officers of any Publick Boards from all Penalties incurred by Reason of the Name and Place of Abode of the Printer of such Papers not being printed thereon. (Repealed by Statute Law Revision Act 1861 (24 & 25 Vict. c. 101))
Duties on Income (No. 2) Act 1800 (repealed)	39 & 40 Geo. 3. c. 96	28 July 1800
An Act for explaining and amending so much of an Act, (Note: Duties on Income Act 1800 (39 & 40 Geo. 3. c. 49)) passed in the present Session of Parliament, relating to the Duties on Income, as respects the Delivery of the Statements to the Commercial Commissioners of London, under the Amount of Twenty Pounds. (Repealed by Statute Law Revision Act 1861 (24 & 25 Vict. c. 101))
London Flour Company Act 1800 (repealed)	39 & 40 Geo. 3. c. 97	28 July 1800
An Act to incorporate certain Persons by the Name of "The London Company for the Manufacture of Flour, Meal, and Bread", for a limited Time. (Repealed by Statute Law Revision Act 1861 (24 & 25 Vict. c. 101))
Accumulations Act 1800 or the Thellusson Act 1800 (repealed)	39 & 40 Geo. 3. c. 98	28 July 1800
An Act to restrain all Trusts and Directions in Deeds or Wills, whereby the Profits of Produce of Real or Personal Estate shall be accumulated, and the beneficial Enjoyment thereof postponed beyond the Time therein limited. (Repealed by Law of Property Act 1925 (15 & 16 Geo. 5. c. 20))
Pawnbrokers Act 1800 (repealed)	39 & 40 Geo. 3. c. 99	28 July 1800
An Act for better regulating the Business of Pawnbrokers. (Repealed by Pawnbrokers Act 1872 (35 & 36 Vict. c. 93))
Army and Navy (No. 2) Act 1800 (repealed)	39 & 40 Geo. 3. c. 100	28 July 1800
An Act to authorize his Majesty to grant Commissions to Natives of the Seven United Provinces, or of the Hereditary States of the Prince of Orange, to serve on board certain Dutch Ships of War surrendered to his Majesty's Fleet, and in Regiments in the Pay of his Majesty; and to enable any such Natives to inlift as Soldiers in such Regiments, under certain Restrictions. (Repealed by Statute Law Revision Act 1871 (34 & 35 Vict. c. 116))
Loans to Alexander Houston and Company, etc. Act 1800 (repealed)	39 & 40 Geo. 3. c. 101	28 July 1800
An Act to give further Time for the Payment, on the Conditions therein mentioned, of Instalments on certain Loans advanced to the House of Alexander Houstoun and Company, to Charles Ashwell Esquire, and to William Johnstone Esquire, being Persons connected with and trading to the Islands of Grenada and Saint Vincent. (Repealed by Statute Law Revision Act 1871 (34 & 35 Vict. c. 116))
Loans or Exchequer Bills Act 1800 (repealed)	39 & 40 Geo. 3. c. 102	28 July 1800
An Act for raising the Sum of three millions five hundred thousand Pounds by Loans or Exchequer Bills, for the Service of the Year one thousand eight hundred. (Repealed by Statute Law Revision Act 1871 (34 & 35 Vict. c. 116))
Loans or Exchequer Bills (No. 2) Act 1800 (repealed)	39 & 40 Geo. 3. c. 103	28 July 1800
An Act for raising the Sum of three Millions, by Loans or Exchequer Bills, for the Service of the Year thousand eight hundred. (Repealed by Statute Law Revision Act 1871 (34 & 35 Vict. c. 116))
Loans or Exchequer Bills (No. 3) Act 1800 (repealed)	39 & 40 Geo. 3. c. 104	28 July 1800
An Act for raising the further Sum of three Millions, by Loans or Exchequer Bills, for the Service of the Year thousand eight hundred. (Repealed by Statute Law Revision Act 1871 (34 & 35 Vict. c. 116))
Common Pleas of Lancaster Act 1800 (repealed)	39 & 40 Geo. 3. c. 105	28 July 1800
An Act for the better regulating the Practice, and for preventing Delays in the Proceedings of the Court of Common Pleas at Lancaster. (Repealed by Statute Law Revision Act 1871 (34 & 35 Vict. c. 116))
Unlawful Combinations of Workmen Act 1800 (repealed)	39 & 40 Geo. 3. c. 106	29 July 1800
An Act to repeal an Act, passed in the last Session of Parliament, intituled, "An Act to prevent Unlawful Combinations of Workmen"; (Note: Combination Act 1799 (39 Geo. 3. c. 81)) and to substitute other provisions in lieu thereof. (Repealed by Masters and Workmen Arbitration Act 1824 (5 Geo. 4. c. 96))
Importation (No. 2) Act 1800 (repealed)	39 & 40 Geo. 3. c. 107	29 July 1800
An Act to permit, until six Weeks after the Commencement of the next Session of Parliament, the Importation of Swedish Herrings into Great Britain. (Repealed by Sea Fisheries Act 1868 (31 & 32 Vict. c. 45))
Indemnity to Governor of Surinam Act 1800 (repealed)	39 & 40 Geo. 3. c. 108	29 July 1800
An Act for indemnifying the Governor of Surinam, or the Person acting as such, for having permitted the Importation and Exportation of Goods and Commodities in Foreign Bottoms; and for making void all Seizures of Ships, Vessels, or Goods, for any Thing done in pursuance of such Permission. (Repealed by Statute Law Revision Act 1871 (34 & 35 Vict. c. 116))
Exchequer Bills Act 1800 (repealed)	39 & 40 Geo. 3. c. 109	29 July 1800
An Act for granting to his Majesty a certain Sum of Money out of the Consolidated Fund, for applying certain Sums of Money therein mentioned, for the Service of the Year one thousand eight hundred; for further appropriating the Supplies granted in this Session of Parliament and for making forth Duplicates of Exchequer Bills, Lottery Tickets, Certificates, Receipts, Annuity Orders, or other Orders, lost, burnt, or otherwise destroyed. (Repealed by Statute Law Revision Act 1948 (11 & 12 Geo. 6. c. 62))

=== Local acts ===
Short title	Citation	Royal assent
Long title
Isle of Ely Drainage Act 1800	39 & 40 Geo. 3. c. i	10 March 1800
An Act for altering, amending, and rendering more effectual, an Act made in the Twenty-first Year of the Reign of King George the Second, intituled, "An Act for draining and preserving certain Fen Lands in the several Parishes of Maney, Upwell, Welney, Downham, Witcham, and in a certain extra-parochial Place in Byal Fen, within the Isle of Ely, and County of Cambridge." (Note: Fen Drainage Act 1747 (21 Geo. 2. c. 18))
Leicester and Ashby-de-la-Zouch Road Act 1800 (repealed)	39 & 40 Geo. 3. c. ii	10 March 1800
An Act for continuing, for Twenty-one Years, and from thence to the End of the then next Session of Parliament, the Term, and altering and enlarging the Powers, of Two Acts, passed in the Twenty-sixth Year of his late Majesty, (Note: Leicester Roads Act 1753 (26 Geo. 2. c. 46)) and in the Nineteenth Year of His present Majesty, (Note: Leicester Roads Act 1779 (19 Geo. 3. c. 90)) for repairing the Road from the Borough of Leicester, in the County of Leicester, to the Town of Ashby-de-la-Zouch. in the said County. (Repealed by Leicester and Ashby-de-la-Zouch Road Act 1842 (5 & 6 Vict. c. lxxiv))
Leicester and Narborough and Hinckley Roads Act 1800 (repealed)	39 & 40 Geo. 3. c. iii	10 March 1800
An Act for more effectually repairing, widening, and improving, the Roads from the Borough of Leicester, in the County of Leicester, to the Town of Narborough, and from the said Borough of Leicester to the Town of Earl Shilton, and from the said Town of Earl Shilton to the Town of Hinckley, in the said County. (Repealed by Leicester and Narborough and Hinckley Roads Act 1842 (5 & 6 Vict. c. lxx))
Great Yarmouth Harbour Act 1800 (repealed)	39 & 40 Geo. 3. c. iv	25 March 1800
An Act for continuing, for a further Term of Twenty-one Years, and from thence to the End of the then next Session of Parliament, the Term of Two Acts, One made in the Twelfth, (Note: Great Yarmouth (Improvement) Act 1772 (12 Geo. 3. c. 14)) and the other in the Twenty-fifth (Note: Great Yarmouth (Improvement) Act 1785 (25 Geo. 3. c. 36)) Year of the Reign of His present Majesty, for clearing, depthening, repairing, maintaining, and improving, the Haven and Piers of Great Yarmouth; and for depthening, and making more navigable, the several Rivers emptying themselves into the said Haven, and preserving Ships, wintering therein, from Accidents by Fire; and also, for building a new Bridge over the Haven of Great Yarmouth; and for altering and enlarging the Powers thereof, so far as the same relate to the said Haven and Piers. (Repealed by Great Yarmouth Haven, Bridge and Navigation Act 1835 (5 & 6 Will. 4. c. xlix))
Cantley and Hassingham Inclosure and Drainage Act 1800	39 & 40 Geo. 3. c. v	25 March 1800
An Act for dividing, allotting, and inclosing, the Commons and Waste Grounds within the Parishes of Cantley and Hassingham, in the County of Norfolk, and for draining and preserving the same, and also certain Marsh Lands, within the said Parishes.
Brent Bridge and Plymouth Road Act 1800 (repealed)	39 & 40 Geo. 3. c. vi	25 March 1800
An Act for continuing, for the Term of Twenty-one Years, and from thence to the End of the then next Session of Parliament, and for altering and enlarging the Powers of Two Acts, One made in the Thirty-first Year of the Reign of his late Majesty King George the Second, (Note: Devon Roads Act 1757 (31 Geo. 2. c. 51)) and the other in the Seventeenth Year of the Reign of His present Majesty, (Note: Brent Bridge to Plymouth Road Act 1777 (17 Geo. 3. c. 81)) for repairing the High Road leading from Brent Bridge, in the County of Devon, to Gasking Gate, in or near the Borough of Plymouth, in the said County. (Repealed by Brent Bridge and Plymouth (Gasking Street) Road Act 1841 (4 & 5 Vict. c. xxxii))
Ilchester Roads Act 1800 (repealed)	39 & 40 Geo. 3. c. vii	25 March 1800
An Act for more effectually amending, widening, improving, and keeping in Repair, several Roads leading, from the Town of Ivelchester, in the County of Somerset. (Repealed by Yeovil and Ilchester Turnpike Trusts Act 1852 (15 & 16 Vict. c. cxiii))
Sevenoaks and Tunbridge Wells Road Tolls Act 1800 (repealed)	39 & 40 Geo. 3. c. viii	25 March 1800
An Act for increasing the Tolls authorized to be taken on the Road leading from Sevenoaks Common to the Market House in Tunbridge Town, by an Act, passed in the Thirty-third Year of the Reign of His present Majesty, (Note: Kent Roads (No. 2) Act 1793 (33 Geo. 3. c. 183)) for repairing the Road leading from Sevenoaks Common to Woodsgate, Tunbridge Wells, and Kipping's Cross, in the County of Kent, and from Tunbridge Wells to Woodsgate, aforesaid. (Repealed by Sevenoaks and Tunbridge Wells Roads Act 1814 (54 Geo. 3. c. clxxiv))
Milford and Dunckton Hill and Stopham Bridge Roads Act 1800 (repealed)	39 & 40 Geo. 3. c. ix	25 March 1800
An Act to continue for Twenty-one Years, and from thence to the End of the then next Session of Parliament, the Term, and alter the Powers of Two Acts, made in the Thirtieth Year of the Reign of his late Majesty, (Note: Surrey and Sussex Roads Act 1757 (30 Geo. 2. c. 50)) and the Fifth Year of the Reign of His present Majesty, (Note: Sussex Roads Act 1765 (5 Geo. 3. c. 57)) for amending the Roads leading from the Village of Milford, in the County of Surrey, through Petworth, to the Top of Dunckton Hill, and from Petworth to Stopham Bridge, in the County of Sussex. (Repealed by Petworth Turnpike Roads Act 1854 (17 & 18 Vict. c. lxxi))
Kingston-upon-Hull Dock Act 1800 (repealed)	39 & 40 Geo. 3. c. x	4 April 1800
An Act for the Appointment and Regulation of Pilots for the conducting of Ships and Vessels into and out of the Port of Kingston upon-Hull; and for ascertaining the Salvage for Anchors, Cables, and other Ships' Materials, found in the River Humber; and for the better ascertaining the Tonnage of Ballast Lighters employed at the said Port. (Repealed by Hull and Humber Pilotage Act 1832 (2 & 3 Will. 4. c. cv))
Aberdeen Streets Act 1800	39 & 40 Geo. 3. c. xi	4 April 1800
An Act for opening and making two new Streets in the City of Aberdeen.
Hexham and Alston Road Act 1800 (repealed)	39 & 40 Geo. 3. c. xii	4 April 1800
An Act for more effectually repairing the Road from Summerrods Bar, near the Town of Hexham, in the County of Northumberland, to the Town of Alston, in the County of Cumberland. (Repealed by Hexham and Alston Road Act 1821 (1 & 2 Geo. 4. c. x))
Halifax and Sowerby Bridge and Burnley and Littleborough Roads Act 1800 (repealed)	39 & 40 Geo. 3. c. xiii	4 April 1800
An Act for continuing for twenty-one Years, and from thence to the End of the then next Session of Parliament, the Term and altering and enlarging the Powers of two Acts, passed in the thirty-third Year of the Reign of his late Majesty King George the Second, (Note: Yorks and Lancaster Roads Act 1759 (33 Geo. 2. c. 48)) and in the seventeenth Year of the Reign of his present Majesty, (Note: Yorks and Lancaster Roads Act 1777 (17 Geo. 3. c. 90)) for diverting, altering, widening, repairing, and amending the Roads from the Town of Halifax, and from Sowerby Bridge, in the County of York, by Todmorden, to Burnley and Littleborough, in the County of Lancaster. (Repealed by Todmorden and Burnley, Littleborough, and Halifax Roads Act 1821 (1 & 2 Geo. 4. c. cxi))
Greenhead and Shildon Bar Road and Corbridge Branch Act 1800 (repealed)	39 & 40 Geo. 3. c. xiv	4 April 1800
An Act for more effectually repairing the Road from Glenwhelt through Haltwhistle, Hexham, and Corbridge, to the Military Road near Shildon Bar; and for making and repairing a Branch Road from Corbridge aforesaid, to Heddon-on-the-Wall, all in the County of Northumberland. (Repealed by Road from Greenhead (Northumberland) to Shildon Bar Act 1820 (1 Geo. 4. c. xxvi))
Magor and Chepstow Road Act 1800	39 & 40 Geo. 3. c. xv	4 April 1800
An Act for more effectually repairing, widening, and improving the Road from the Village of Magor to the Bridge Foot in the Town of Chepstow in the County of Monmouth, and several other Roads in the Counties of Monmouth, Gloucester, Hereford, and Brecon, to continue in Force for twenty-one Years, and from thence to the End of the then next Session of Parliament.
Witney and Woodstock Roads Act 1800	39 & 40 Geo. 3. c. xvi	4 April 1800
An Act for amending, altering, improving, and keeping in Repair, the Road leading from the Turnpike Road in Witney to the Turnpike Road on Swerford Heath, and also the Road leading from the Turnpike Road from Woodstock to Birmingham, through Charlbury, to the Turnpike Road from Chipping Norton to Burford, all in the County of Oxford.
Stonehaven and Cobleheugh Road Act 1800 (repealed)	39 & 40 Geo. 3. c. xvii	24 April 1800
An Act for making and repairing the Road from the Town of Stonehaven, through the Slug-mount, to the new Bridge over the River Dee at Cobleheugh, in the County of Kincardine. (Repealed by Stonehaven and Cobleheugh Road (Slug Mount) Act 1842 (5 & 6 Vict. c. lxxv))
Wakefield and Austerlands Road Act 1800 (repealed)	39 & 40 Geo. 3. c. xviii	24 April 1800
An Act for continuing for twenty-one Years, and from thence to the End of the then next Session of Parliament, the Term, and altering and enlarging the Powers of two Acts, made in the thirty-second Year of the Reign of his late Majesty King George the Second, (Note: Wakefield to Austerlands Road Act 1758 (32 Geo. 2. c. 48)) and in the eighteenth Year of the Reign of his present Majesty, (Note: Wakefield Roads Act 1778 (18 Geo. 3. c. 85)) for repairing the Road from Wakefield to Austerlands, in the West Riding of the County of York. (Repealed by Wakefield and Austerlands Road Act 1820 (1 Geo. 4. c. lxviii))
Haslingden and Todmorden Road and Branches Act 1800 (repealed)	39 & 40 Geo. 3. c. xix	24 April 1800
An Act to continue for twenty-one Years, and from thence to the End of the then next Session of Parliament, the Term, and alter and enlarge the Powers of an Act, made in the twenty-ninth Year of the Reign of his present Majesty, (Note: Lancaster Roads Act 1789 (29 Geo. 3. c. 107)) for amending, widening, turning, varying, altering, and keeping in Repair several Roads therein mentioned, in the County Palatine of Lancaster, to far as the same relates to the Road from Haslingden to Todmorden, being a second District of the said Roads; and for making and maintaining a Branch therefrom at or near a Place called Fearns in Wolfenden Booth, to Edge Side in the same Booth, and another Branch therefrom at or near a Place called Robert's Millin Bacup Booth, into the Rochdale Turnpike Road in the Parish of Spotland, all in the said County Palatine of Lancaster. (Repealed by Road from Haslingden to Todmorden Act 1815 (55 Geo. 3. c. xiv))
Alemouth and Hexham Road and Branches Act 1800 (repealed)	39 & 40 Geo. 3. c. xx	24 April 1800
An Act for more effectually repairing the Road from Alemouth, through Alnwick and Rothbury, to Hexham, and a Branch from the said Road, between Alnwick and Rothbury, to Jockey's Dike Bridge, in the County of Northumberland. (Repealed by Alemouth and Hexham Road and Branch Act 1821 (1 & 2 Geo. 4. c. lxxxiv))
Ludham Inclosure Act 1800	39 & 40 Geo. 3. c. xxi	1 May 1800
An Act for dividing, allotting, inclosing, draining, and preserving the Open Fields, Commons, Fens, and Waste Grounds within the Parish of Ludham, in the County of Norfolk.
Heronsyke, Kendal and Eamont Bridge Road Act 1800	39 & 40 Geo. 3. c. xxii	1 May 1800
An Act for continuing for twenty-one Years, and from thence to the End of the then next Session of Parliament, the Term, and altering and enlarging the Powers of two Acts, (Note: Lancaster and Westmorland Roads Act 1753 (26 Geo. 2. c. 52)) (Note: Westmorland Roads (No. 2) Act 1779 (19 Geo. 3. c. 108)) passed for widening and repairing the High Road leading from Heron Syke, which divides the Counties of Lancaster and Westmorland, to the Town of Kirkby in Kendal, and from the said Town of Kirkby in Kendal, through the Town of Shap, to Emont Bridge, in the said County of Westmorland.
Thames and Medway Canal Act 1800	39 & 40 Geo. 3. c. xxiii	16 May 1800
An Act for making and maintaining a navigable Canal from the River Thames, near to the Town of Gravesend, in the County of Kent, to the River Medway, at a Place called Nicholson's Ship-Yard, in the Parish of Frindsbury, in the said County; and also a certain Collateral Cut, from White Wall in the said Parish, to the said River Medway.
Ashton Canal Act 1800	39 & 40 Geo. 3. c. xxiv	16 May 1800
An Act for amending the several Acts (Note: Manchester and Oldham Canal Act 1792 (32 Geo. 3. c. 84)) (Note: Manchester and Stockport Canal Act 1793 (33 Geo. 3. c. 21)) (Note: Ashton Canal Act 1798 (38 Geo. 3. c. xxxii)) passed for making, extending, finishing, and completing the Canal Navigation from Manchester to or near Ashton-under-Lyne and Oldham, and the several Cuts and other Works authorized to be made and done by the Company of Proprietors of the said Canal Navigation; and for granting to the said Company further and other Powers.
Berwick-upon-Tweed Improvement Act 1800	39 & 40 Geo. 3. c. xxv	16 May 1800
An Act for lighting the Streets and Lanes of the Borough of Berwick-upon-Tweed, and the Quays and Wharfs belonging to the said Borough, and that Part of the Bridge over the River Tweed, which lies within the Liberties of the said Borough, and also the Street of Castlegate, within the said Borough or the Liberties thereof; and for paving the Foot-paths of the Streets of the said Borough and of Castlegate aforesaid; and for preventing Obstructions, Nuisances, and Annoyances therein.
Bedford Level (Hundred Foot River and Ouse) Drainage Act 1800	39 & 40 Geo. 3. c. xxvi	16 May 1800
An Act to alter, explain, amend, and render more effectual, an Act, passed in the twenty-ninth Year of the Reign of his late Majesty King George the Second, intituled "An Act for draining and preserving certain Fen Lands in the Isle of Ely and County of Norfolk, lying between The Hundred Foot River and the Ouze, and bounded on the South by the Hard Lands of Mepall, Wicham, Wentworth, Wichford, Ely, Downham, and Littleport; and for empowering the Governor, Bailiffs, and Commonalty of the Company of Conservators of the Great Level of the Fens, commonly called Bedford Level, to fell certain Lands lying within the Limits aforesaid, commonly called Invested Lands." (Note: Hundred Foot River and Ouse (Bedford Level) Act 1756 (29 Geo. 2. c. 22))
Leatherhead and Stoke (Surrey) Road Act 1800	39 & 40 Geo. 3. c. xxvii	16 May 1800
An Act for continuing for twenty-one Years, and from thence to the End of the then next Session of Parliament, the Term, and altering and enlarging the Powers of two Acts, passed in the thirty-first Year of the Reign of his late Majesty King George the Second, (Note: Leatherhead and Guildford Road Act 1757 (31 Geo. 2. c. 77)) and in the nineteenth Year of the Reign of his present Majesty, (Note: Surrey Roads Act 1779 (19 Geo. 3. c. 104)) for repairing and widening the Road from The Swan Inn at Leatherhead, to the May Pole at the upper End of Spital or Somerset-Street, in the Parish of Stoke near the Town of Guldeford, in the County of Surrey.
Lyme Regis Roads Act 1800 (repealed)	39 & 40 Geo. 3. c. xxviii	16 May 1800
An Act for continuing for twenty-one Years, and from thence to the End of the then next Session of Parliament, the Term, and altering and enlarging the Powers of two Acts, passed in the thirty-first Year of the Reign of his late Majesty King George the Second, (Note: Dorset and Devon Roads Act 1757 (31 Geo. 2. c. 43)) and the tenth Year of the Reign of his present Majesty, (Note: Lyme Regis Roads Act 1770 (10 Geo. 3. c. 59)) for repairing several Roads in the Counties of Dorset and Devon, leading to and through the Borough of Lyme Regis, and from the Turnpike Road on Uplyme Hill to the Turnpike Road at The Three Ashes, in the Parish of Crewkerne, in the County of Somerset, and other Roads therein mentioned. (Repealed by Lyme Regis Roads Act 1821 (1 & 2 Geo. 4. c. cviii))
Ripon and Pateley Bridge Road Act 1800	39 & 40 Geo. 3. c. xxix	16 May 1800
An Act for continuing for twenty-one Years, and from thence to the End of the then next Session of Parliament, the Term, and altering and enlarging the Powers of two Acts, made in the twenty-ninth Year of the Reign of his late Majesty King George the Second, (Note: Yorkshire Roads (No. 2) Act 1756 (29 Geo. 2. c. 83)) and the twentieth Year of the Reign of his present Majesty, (Note: Yorkshire Roads Act 1780 (20 Geo. 3. c. 86)) so far as the same relate to repairing and widening the Road from the Borough of Ripon, by Ingram Bank, to the Town of Pateley Bridge, in the County of York.
Denbigh and Ruthland Road Act 1800	39 & 40 Geo. 3. c. xxx	16 May 1800
An Act for continuing for twenty-one Years, and from thence to the End of the then next Session of Parliament, the Term and altering and enlarging the Powers of an Act, passed in the twenty-first Year of the Reign of his present Majesty, (Note: Denbigh to Ruthland Road Act 1781 (21 Geo. 3. c. 80)) intituled, "An Act for more effectually repairing the Road leading from the Town of Denbigh to the Town of Saint Asaph, and from thence to the Town and Port of Ruthland, in the Counties of Denbigh and Flint; and for repealing an Act, made in the thirty-second Year of his late Majesty King George the Second, (Note: Denbigh, Flint and Carnarvon Roads Act 1758 (32 Geo. 2. c. 55)) so far as the same relates to the said Road."
Wrexham and Pentre Bridge Road Act 1800	39 & 40 Geo. 3. c. xxxi	16 May 1800
An Act for continuing for twenty-one Years, and from thence to the End of the then next Session of Parliament, the Term, and altering the Powers of two Acts, passed in the thirtieth Year of the Reign of his late Majesty King George the Second, (Note: Denbigh and Carnarvon Roads Act 1757 (30 Geo. 2. c. 69)) and in the nineteenth Year of the Reign of his present Majesty, (Note: Denbigh, Flint and Carnarvon Roads Act 1779 (19 Geo. 3. c. 109)) for amending widening and keeping in Repair, several Roads therein mentioned, so far as the said Acts relate to the Road leading from the Town of Wrexham in the County of Denbigh, to Pentre Bridge in the County of Flint.
Aberdeen County Roads and Bridges Act 1800 (repealed)	39 & 40 Geo. 3. c. xxxii	30 May 1800
An Act for repealing an Act passed in the thirty-fifth Year of his present Majesty's Reign, intituled "An Act for making and repairing certain Roads in the County of Aberdeen;" (Note: Aberdeen Roads Act 1795 (35 Geo. 3. c. 161)) and for the more effectually amending, widening, repairing, and keeping in Repair the said Roads, and other Roads in the said County, and for levying a Conversion Money in lieu of the Statute Labour, and otherwise regulating the making and repairing the High Roads and Bridges in the said County. (Repealed by Aberdeenshire Roads Act 1865 (28 & 29 Vict. c. ccxl))
Croston, Mawdesley, Rufford, Bispham, Tarleton and Bretherton Drainage Act 1800	39 & 40 Geo. 3. c. xxxiii	30 May 1800
An Act for draining, improving, and preserving the Low Lands and Grounds within the Townships of Croston, Mawdesley, Rufford, Bispham, Tarleton, and Bretherton, in the County Palatine of Lancaster.
Perth, Cupar and Glammis Road Act 1800	39 & 40 Geo. 3. c. xxxiv	30 May 1800
An Act for enlarging the Powers of so much of two Acts, made in the twenty-ninth (Note: Perth Roads Act 1789 (29 Geo. 3. c. 17)) and thirty-third (Note: Perth Roads Act 1793 (33 Geo. 3. c. 158)) Years of the Reign of his present Majesty, for making and repairing certain Roads in the County of Perth, as relates to the Road from Perth to Cupar, or the Neighbourhood thereof, towards Glammis, as far as the Confines of the said County.
St. John Hampstead Poor Relief Act 1800 (repealed)	39 & 40 Geo. 3. c. xxxv	30 May 1800
An Act for the better Relief and Employment of the Poor of the Parish of Saint John Hamstead in the County of Middlesex.
Rochdale Canal Act 1800	39 & 40 Geo. 3. c. xxxvi	30 May 1800
An Act for better enabling the Company of Proprietors of the Rochdale Canal to raise Money for completing the said Canal, and to vary the Line of the said Canal, and to alter, explain, and amend, the Act, passed in the thirty-fourth Year of the Reign of his present Majesty, (Note: Rochdale Canal Act 1794 (34 Geo. 3. c. 78)) for making the said Canal.
Dearne and Dove Canal Act 1800	39 & 40 Geo. 3. c. xxxvii	30 May 1800
An Act to enable the Dearne and Dove Canal Company to finish and complete the said Canal, and the several Collateral Cuts branching therefrom; and for explaining, amending, and enlarging the Powers of an Act, passed in the thirty-third Year of the Reign of his present Majesty, (Note: Dearne and Dove Canal Act 1793 (33 Geo. 3. c. 115)) for making and maintaining the said Canal and Collateral Cuts; and for encreasing the Tolls thereby granted.
Peak Forest Canal Act 1800	39 & 40 Geo. 3. c. xxxviii	30 May 1800
An Act for altering and amending an Act, passed in the thirty-fourth Year of the Reign of his present Majesty, (Note: Manchester and Oldham Canal Act 1794 (34 Geo. 3. c. 26)) for making and maintaining the Peak Forest Canal; and for granting to the Company of Proprietors of the said Canal further and other Powers.
Huddersfield Narrow Canal Act 1800	39 & 40 Geo. 3. c. xxxix	30 May 1800
An Act for enabling the Huddersfield Canal Company to finish and complete the Huddersfield Canal; and for amending the Act, passed in the thirty-fourth Year of the Reign of his present Majesty, (Note: Huddersfield to Ashton-under-Lyne Canal Act 1794 (34 Geo. 3. c. 53)) for making and maintaining the said Huddersfield Canal.
Huntingdonshire and Cambridgeshire Drainage Act 1800	39 & 40 Geo. 3. c. xl	30 May 1800
An Act for amending and making more effectual an Act, passed in the twelfth Year of the Reign of his present Majesty, (Note: Drainage (Cambridge, Isle of Ely) Act 1772 (12 Geo. 3. c. 26)) for embanking, draining, and preserving certain Fen Lands and Low Grounds, in the Parish of Ramsey, in the County of Huntingdon, and in the Parishes of Diddington, March, Benwick, Wimblington, and Chatteris, within the Isle of Ely, in the County of Cambridge; and for amending the Road from a certain Bridge in the Parish of Chatteris aforesaid, called Carter's Bridge, by a Drain called Vermuyden's, or The Forty Feet Drain, to a Bridge called The Forty Feet Bridge, in the said Parish of Ramsey; so far as the said Act relates to embanking the Lands therein described, called by the Name of The Upper District or Division.
Wychtree Bridge Act 1800 (repealed)	39 & 40 Geo. 3. c. xli	30 May 1800
An Act for continuing for twenty-one Years, and from thence to the End of the then next Session of Parliament, the Term and altering and enlarging the Powers of an Act, passed in the eighteenth Year of the Reign of his present Majesty, (Note: Wychtree Bridge Act 1778 (18 Geo. 3. c. 68)) for building a Bridge across the River Tawey, (Note: Wychtree Bridge, Morriston, demolished in 1959; on the route of the A48 road. Designed by William Edwards.) at a Place called The Wich Tree, in the Parish of Llansamlett, to the opposite Shore in the Parish of Llangefelach, in the County of Glamorgan; for making proper Avenues or Roads to and from the said Bridge, and also for repairing and widening the Road from Pentre Brook, near a Place called Aberdwyberthy, in the Parish of Saint John's, near Swansea, to the said intended Bridge. (Repealed by Turnpike Trusts in South Wales Act 1844 (7 & 8 Vict. c. 91))
Temple Bar Improvement Act 1800 (repealed)	39 & 40 Geo. 3. c. xlii	30 May 1800
An Act for raising a further Sum of Money for carrying into Execution two several Acts, passed in the thirty-fifth (Note: Temple Bar, etc. Act 1795 (35 Geo. 3. c. 126)) and thirty-eighth (Note: Temple Bar Improvement Act 1798 (38 Geo. 3. c. lxi)) Years of the Reign of his present Majesty, for widening and improving the Entrance into the City of London, near Temple Bar, for making a more commodious Street or Passage at Snow Hill, and for raising, on the Credit of the Orphan's Fund, a Sum of Money for those Purposes; and for explaining and amending the said Acts. (Repealed by Statute Law (Repeals) Act 2013 (c. 2))
Rodburgh and Birdlip Road Act 1800 (repealed)	39 & 40 Geo. 3. c. xliii	30 May 1800
An Act for making and maintaining a Road from, or from near, Lightpill Gate, on the Road leading from Bath to Dudbridge, in the Parish of Rodborough, to join the Turnpike Road from Painswick to Cheltenham, at or near to Birdlip, in the Parishes of Brimpsfield and Cowley, or one of them, all in the County of Gloucester. (Repealed by Lightpill and Birdlip Road Act 1855 (18 & 19 Vict. c. cvi))
Norton and Halton Estate Roads (Chester) Act 1800	39 & 40 Geo. 3. c. xliv	30 May 1800
An Act for shutting up and discontinuing certain Roads and Foot Paths, leading through the Grounds of Sir Richard Brooke Baronet, in the Townships of Norton and Halton, in the Parish of Runcorn, and County Palatine of Chester, and for making and maintaining other Roads instead thereof.
Nottingham, Oakerthorpe and Wirksworth Roads Act 1800 (repealed)	39 & 40 Geo. 3. c. xlv	30 May 1800
An Act for continuing for twenty-one Years, and from thence to the End of the then next Session of Parliament, the Term, and altering and enlarging the Powers of two Acts, made in the thirty-second Year of the Reign of his late Majesty King George the Second, (Note: Notts and Derby Roads Act 1758 (32 Geo. 2. c. 38)) and in the twentieth Year of the Reign of his present Majesty, (Note: Derby and Nottinghamshire Roads Act 1780 (20 Geo. 3. c. 74)) for repairing and widening the Roads from Chapel Bar, near the West End of the Town of Nottingham to Newhaven, and from the Four Lane Ends, near Oakerthorpe, to Ashborne, and from the Cross Post on Wirksworth Moor, to join the Road leading from Chesterfield to Chapel-en-le-Frith, at or near Longston, in the County of Derby, and from Selston to Annesley Woodhouse, in the County of Nottingham. (Repealed by Nottingham and Newhaven Turnpike Road Act 1855 (18 & 19 Vict. c. xcii))
Chippenham and Westerleigh Road Act 1800	39 & 40 Geo. 3. c. xlvi	30 May 1800
An Act for more effectually repairing, widening, altering, and improving, the Road from a Place called The Stone Pillar or Cross Hand, in the Parish of Chippenham, in the County of Wilts, to or near to a Bridge called Knox Bridge, in the Parish of Westerleigh, in the County of Gloucester, and several other Roads therein mentioned, in the said Counties of Wilts and Gloucester.
Port of London Improvement Act 1800 or the London Dock Act 1800 (repealed)	39 & 40 Geo. 3. c. xlvii	20 June 1800
An Act for making Wet Docks, Basons, Cuts, and other Works, for the greater Accommodation and Security of Shipping, Commerce, and Revenue, within the Port of London. (Repealed by Statute Law (Repeals) Act 1993 (c. 50))
Aldbourne Workhouse and Overseers Act 1800 (repealed)	39 & 40 Geo. 3. c. xlviii	20 June 1800
An Act for providing a Workhouse for the Use of the Parish of Aldbourne in the County of Wilts; and for appointing an Additional Overseer for the better Government of the Poor of the said Parish. (Repealed by Statute Law (Repeals) Act 2013 (c. 2))
St. Pancras Improvement Act 1800 (repealed)	39 & 40 Geo. 3. c. xlix	20 June 1800
An Act for forming, paving, cleansing, lighting, watching, watering, and otherwise improving, and keeping in Repair, the Streets, Squares, and other Publick Passages and Places, which are and shall be made upon certain Pieces or Plots of Ground, in the Parish of Saint Pancras, in the County of Middlesex, belonging to the Most Noble Francis Duke of Bedford. (Repealed by London Government (Borough of St. Pancras) Order in Council 1901 (SR&O 1901/274))
Russell Square Improvement Act 1800	39 & 40 Geo. 3. c. l	20 June 1800
An Act for enclosing and embellishing the Centre of an Area of a certain Square, intended to be called Russel Square, purposed to be made in the Parish of Saint George Bloomsbury, in the County of Middlesex, and for forming and making the same into a Pleasure Ground, and for continuing and keeping the same in Repair.
Chelmsford Parish Church Act 1800	39 & 40 Geo. 3. c. li	20 June 1800
An Act for repairing the Parish Church of Chelmsford, in the County of Essex.
Argyllshire Roads and Bridges Act 1800 (repealed)	39 & 40 Geo. 3. c. lii	20 June 1800
An Act for explaining, amending, and continuing an Act made in the fifteenth Year of the Reign of his present Majesty, intituled, "An Act for repairing the Highways and Bridges in the Shire of Argyll." (Note: Argyll Roads and Bridges Act 1775 (15 Geo. 3. c. 63)) (Repealed by Argyllshire and Dumbartonshire Roads, Bridges and Quays Act 1816 (56 Geo. 3. c. lxx))
New Sarum Gaol Act 1800 (repealed)	39 & 40 Geo. 3. c. liii	20 June 1800
An Act for repealing so much of an Act, passed in the twenty-fifth Year of the Reign of his present Majesty, intituled, "An Act for the Removal and Rebuilding of the Council Chamber, Guildhall, and Gaol of the City of New Sarum, and for ascertaining the Tolls of the Market, and regulating the Chairmen within the said City," (Note: Salisbury (Improvement) Act 1785 (25 Geo. 3. c. 93)) as requires the Mayor and Commonality of the City of New Sarum to build a new Gaol within the said City, or the Suburbs or Precincts thereof; and for authorizing the Commitment of Felons and other Persons within the Limits of the said City and the Close thereof, to the Gaol of the County of Wilts; and for explaining and amending the said Act. (Repealed by Statute Law (Repeals) Act 2008 (c. 12))
Ouse Navigation and Lewes and Laughton Levels Drainage Act 1800 (repealed)	39 & 40 Geo. 3. c. liv	20 June 1800
An Act to alter, amend, and enlarge the Powers of an Act, passed in the thirty-first Year of the Reign of his present Majesty King George the Third, (Note: Lower Ouse Navigation Act 1791 (31 Geo. 3. c. 76)) for improving the Navigation of the River Ouse, between Newhaven Bridge and Lewes Bridge, in the County of Sussex, and for the better draining of the Low Lands lying in Lewes and Laughton Levels, in the said County. (Repealed by Newhaven Harbour and Ouse Lower Navigation Act 1847 (10 & 11 Vict. c. ix))
Melton Mowbray Navigation (Completion) Act 1800	39 & 40 Geo. 3. c. lv	20 June 1800
An Act for enabling the Company of Proprietors of the Navigation from the Leicester Navigation to Melton Mowbray, in the County of Leicester, to complete their Navigation, and to discharge the Debts contracted by them in the making thereof; and for amending the Act, passed in the thirty-first Year of the Reign of his present Majesty, (Note: Wreak and Eye Navigation Act 1791 (31 Geo. 3. c. 77)) for making and maintaining the said Navigation.
Oakham Canal Act 1800	39 & 40 Geo. 3. c. lvi	20 June 1800
An Act to enable the Company of Proprietors of the Oakham Canal to raise Money for completing the said Canal, and also for altering and amending an Act, passed in the thirty-third Year of the Reign of his present Majesty, (Note: Oakham Canal Act 1793 (33 Geo. 3. c. 103)) for making the said Canal.
Lancaster Canal Act 1800	39 & 40 Geo. 3. c. lvii	20 June 1800
An Act for better enabling the Company of Proprietors of the Lancaster Canal Navigation to complete the same.
Staffordshire Inclosure and Drainage Act 1800	39 & 40 Geo. 3. c. lviii	20 June 1800
An Act for dividing, alloting, and inclosing, the Common Fields, Marsh Meadow, and Waste lands, in the Manor of Forebridge, and in the Parish of Castle Church, in the County of Stafford, and for embanking and draining Part of the said Common Fields, Marsh Meadow, and Waste lands, and certain other Low Lands and Grounds in the said Parish of Castle Church, and in the adjoining Parishes, Townships, and Places of Sow Saint Thomas, otherwise Saint Thomas upon Sow, Coton, Berkswich, and Saint Mary in Stafford, in the said County of Stafford.
Fullbridge, Maldon, Bridge over River Chelmer Act 1800	39 & 40 Geo. 3. c. lix	20 June 1800
An Act for building a new Bridge over the River Chelmer, or Blackwater, at Fullbridge, in the Town of Maldon, in the County of Essex.
Female Orphan Asylum Act 1800 (repealed)	39 & 40 Geo. 3. c. lx	20 June 1800
An Act for establishing and well governing the Charitable Institution commonly called The Asylum, or House of Refuge for the Reception of Orphan Girls, the Settlements of whose Parents cannot be found, and for incorporating the Subscribers thereto; and for the better empowering and enabling them to carry on their charitable and useful Designs. (Repealed by Statute Law (Repeals) Act 2013 (c. 2))
Dorset, Devon and Somerset Roads Act 1800 (repealed)	39 & 40 Geo. 3. c. lxi	20 June 1800
An Act for repealing two Acts, one made in the twenty-sixth Year of the Reign of King George the Second, (Note: Somerset Roads Act 1753 (26 Geo. 2. c. 69)) and the other in the seventeenth Year of the Reign of his present Majesty, (Note: Dorset, Devon and Somerset Roads Act 1777 (17 Geo. 3. c. 89)) for repairing the Road from the Half-way House, in the Parish of Lower Compton, in the County of Dorset, through the Towns of Yeovil, Crewkerne, and Chard, to the East End of the Town of Axminster, in the County of Devon, and several other Roads therein mentioned; and also for repealing so much of an Act, made in the eighteenth Year of the Reign of his present Majesty, (Note: Taunton Roads Act 1778 (18 Geo. 3. c. 97)) for repairing several Roads leading from the Town of Taunton, in the County of Somerset, as relates to repairing the Road from the Direction Post in Widcombe Moor, through Street Ash Lane, to Chard, and for making more effectual Provision for those Purposes, and for altering and diverting certain Parts of the said Roads. (Repealed by Yeovil and Ilchester Turnpike Trusts Act 1852 (15 & 16 Vict. c. cxiii))
Elsdon and Red Swyre Road Act 1800	39 & 40 Geo. 3. c. lxii	20 June 1800
An Act for reviving, continuing, and amending an Act, passed in the sixteenth Year of the Reign of his present Majesty, (Note: Northumberland Roads Act 1776 (16 Geo. 3. c. 83)) for repairing the Road from Elsdon High Cross, near the Town of Elsdon, in the County of Northumberland, to the Red Swyre, upon the Mid Border betwixt England and Scotland.
Borrowstouness and Hollhouseburn Road (Linlithgow) Act 1800	39 & 40 Geo. 3. c. lxiii	20 June 1800
An Act for continuing the Term and enlarging the Powers of an Act, passed in the twenty-first Year of the Reign of his present Majesty, (Note: Linlithgow Roads Act 1781 (21 Geo. 3. c. 79)) for repairing and widening the Road leading from the Port of Borrowstounness, by the West of the Borough of Linlithgow, and by the Towns of Torpichen, Bathgate, and Whiteburn, and from thence Southward to the Confines of the County of Linlithgow, at or near Hollhouseburn.
Newport (Salop.) and Stonnall Road Act 1800	39 & 40 Geo. 3. c. lxiv	20 June 1800
An Act to continue for twenty-one Years and from thence to the End of the then next Session of Parliament, the Term, and alter and enlarge the Powers of two Acts, passed in the thirty-third Year of the Reign of his late Majesty King George the Second, (Note: Chester to Birmingham Road Act 1759 (33 Geo. 2. c. 51)) and in the eighteenth Year of the Reign of his present Majesty, (Note: Chester and Whitchurch Roads Act 1778 (18 Geo. 3. c. 86)) for repairing and widening the Road from the Bars at Boughton, within the Liberties of the City of Chester, to Whitchurch, and from thence to Newport in the County of Salop, and several other Roads therein mentioned, so far as the said Acts relate to the Road leading from Newport aforesaid to the Village or Place called Welsh Harp, in the Township of Stonnall, in the County of Stafford, being the third District of the said Roads.
Leominster Roads Act 1800	39 & 40 Geo. 3. c. lxv	20 June 1800
An Act for more effectually repairing, widening, altering, and improving, the Roads therein mentioned, leading from the Town of Leominster, in the County of Hereford.
Ruthin and Mold Roads Act 1800	39 & 40 Geo. 3. c. lxvi	20 June 1800
An Act for continuing for twenty-one Years and from thence to the End of the then next Session of Parliament, the Term and altering and enlarging the Powers of two Acts, passed in the thirtieth Year of the Reign of his late Majesty King George the Second, and in the nineteenth Year of the Reign of his present Majesty, for amending, widening, and keeping in Repair, several Roads therein mentioned, so far as the said Acts relate to the Road leading from the Town of Ruthin, in the County of Denbigh, to the Town of Mold, in the County of Flint.
Hockliffe, Woburn and Newport Pagnell Roads Act 1800 (repealed)	39 & 40 Geo. 3. c. lxvii	20 June 1800
An Act for continuing for twenty-one Years, and from thence to the End of the then next Session of Parliament, the Term and altering and enlarging the Powers of several Acts, (Note: Bedford and Buckingham Roads Act 1727 (1 Geo. 2. St. 2. c. 10)) (Note: Bedfordshire Roads Act 1753 (26 Geo. 2. c. 41)) (Note: Bedford and Buckingham Roads Act 1780 (20 Geo. 3. c. 68)) passed for amending the Highway between Hockliffe and Woburn, in the County of Bedford, and for repairing the Road leading through Woburn to Tickford Bridge, in Newport Pagnell, in the County of Bucks. (Repealed by Hockliffe, Woburn and Newport Pagnell Roads Act 1821 (1 & 2 Geo. 4. c. lxxxv))
Radnor, Hereford and Salop. Roads Act 1800	39 & 40 Geo. 3. c. lxviii	20 June 1800
An Act for continuing for twenty-one Years, and from thence to the End of the then next Session of Parliament, the Term, and altering and enlarging the Powers of two Acts, passed in the twenty-ninth Year of the Reign of his late Majesty King George the Second, (Note: Presteigne Road Act 1756 (29 Geo. 2. c. 94)) and in the eighteenth Year of the Reign of his present Majesty, (Note: Hereford, Radnor and Salop Roads Act 1778 (18 Geo. 3. c. 111)) for amending, repairing, and widening the Roads leading from the Ryeway, in the Parish of Yarpole, in the County of Hereford, to Presteigne, in the County of Radnor, and several other Roads therein mentioned, in the said County of Radnor, and in the Counties of Hereford and Salop.
Roads from Warminster and from Frome Act 1800 (repealed)	39 & 40 Geo. 3. c. lxix	20 June 1800
An Act for enlarging the Term and Powers of an Act, made in the seventeenth Year of his present Majesty's Reign, (Note: Wilts and Somerset Roads (No. 2) Act 1777 (17 Geo. 3. c. 99)) for amending and keeping in Repair the Road from the Town of Warminster in the County of Wilts, to a Place where the Roads to Bath and Bristol divide, and from the Town of Frome to the Town of Beckington, in the County of Somerset, and other Roads therein mentioned. (Repealed by Roads from Warminster and from Frome and from Wolverton Act 1812 (52 Geo. 3. c. lvi))
Lincoln Heath and Peterborough Road Act 1800 (repealed)	39 & 40 Geo. 3. c. lxx	20 June 1800
An Act for continuing for twenty-one Years, and from thence to the End of the then next Session of Parliament, the Term, and altering and enlarging the Powers of two Acts, passed in the twenty-ninth Year of the Reign of his late Majesty King George the Second, (Note: Lincoln and Peterborough Roads Act 1756 (29 Geo. 2. c. 85)) and the sixteenth Year of the Reign of his present Majesty, (Note: Northants and Lincoln Roads Act 1776 (16 Geo. 3. c. 72)) for repairing and widening the Road leading from the East Side of Lincoln Heath to the City of Peterborough, and several other Roads therein mentioned, in the Counties of Northampton and Lincoln. (Repealed by Lincoln Heath and Peterborough and Bourn and Spalding Roads Act 1822 (3 Geo. 4. c. lxvi))
Bewdley Roads Act 1800	39 & 40 Geo. 3. c. lxxi	20 June 1800
An Act for continuing for twenty-one Years, and from thence to the End of the then next Session of Parliament, the Term and altering and enlarging the Powers of two Acts, passed in the twenty-sixth Year of the Reign of his late Majesty King George the Second, (Note: Bewdley Roads Act 1753 (26 Geo. 2. c. 39)) and in the fourteenth Year of the Reign of his present Majesty, (Note: Bewdley Roads Act 1774 (14 Geo. 3. c. 112)) for repairing and widening several Roads leading from the Town of Bewdley, in the County of Worcester, to the several Places therein mentioned, in the Counties of Worcester and Salop respectively.
Spalding High Bridge and Maxey Outgang Roads Act 1800 (repealed)	39 & 40 Geo. 3. c. lxxii	20 June 1800
An Act to continue for twenty-one Years and from thence to the End of the then next Session of Parliament, the Term and alter and enlarge the Powers of two Acts, passed in the thirtieth Year of the Reign of his late Majesty King George the Second, (Note: Lincoln and Northampton Roads Act 1757 (30 Geo. 2. c. 68)) and in the fifth Year of the Reign of his present Majesty, (Note: Lincoln and Northants Roads Act 1765 (5 Geo. 3. c. 106)) for repairing and widening the Roads leading from Spalding High Bridge through Littleworth, and by Frognall, and over James Deping Stone Bridge, in the County of Lincoln, to Maxey Outgang, in County of Northampton, adjoining the High Road there. (Repealed by Spalding, James Deeping Stone Bridge and Maxey Outgang Road Act 1821 (1 & 2 Geo. 4. c. xxxiv))
Ince and Ashton in Mackerfield Road Act 1800	39 & 40 Geo. 3. c. lxxiii	20 June 1800
An Act for amending, widening, improving, and keeping in Repair, the Road leading out of the Common Highway from Wigan to Golborn and Warrington, near the Northerly End of the Southerly Platt Bridge in Ince in Mackerfield, by Ramferlong, into the Turnpike Road from Wigan to Ashton, in Ashton in Mackerfield, in the County Palatine of Lancaster.
Great Bolton and Westhoughton Chapel Road Act 1800 (repealed)	39 & 40 Geo. 3. c. lxxiv	20 June 1800
An Act for amending, widening, improving, and keeping in Repair, the Road leading from the South End of the Moor Lane, in the Township of Great Bolton, into the Turnpike Road from Manchester to Wigan, near Westhoughton Chapel, in the County Palatine of Lancaster. (Repealed by Bolton and Westhoughton Road Act 1842 (5 & 6 Vict. c. lxxiii))
Tetbury and Horsley Roads Act 1800 (repealed)	39 & 40 Geo. 3. c. lxxv	20 June 1800
An Act for continuing the Term, and altering and enlarging the Powers of two Acts, passed in the thirty-first Year of the Reign of his late Majesty King George the Second, (Note: Gloucestershire Roads (No. 3) Act 1757 (31 Geo. 2. c. 65)) and in the twentieth Year of the Reign of his present Majesty, (Note: Gloucester Roads (No. 3) Act 1780 (20 Geo. 3. c. 93)) so far as the same relate to such of the Roads from Tetbury, and other Places in the County of Gloucester as are comprized in the said last mentioned Act, and for amending and repairing certain other Roads in and through the Parish of Horsley, and near Tetbury aforesaid, in the said County of Gloucester. (Repealed by Roads from Tetbury, Frocester Hill and from Latterwood Act 1821 (1 & 2 Geo. 4. c. lxxxiii))
Gloucestershire and Wiltshire Roads Act 1800 (repealed)	39 & 40 Geo. 3. c. lxxvi	20 June 1800
An Act for continuing the Term and altering and enlarging the Powers of an Act passed in the nineteenth Year of his present Majesty's Reign, for amending the Road from the nine Mile Stone on the Bristol Road, at or near a Place called The Clay Pits, to or near the Chapel at Stone, and also the Roads to or near Berkeley, Dursley, Wotton-under-Edge, Stroud, and Sodbury, and several other Roads in the Counties of Gloucester and Wilts, except so far as the said Act relates to the Roads to or near Sodbury aforefaid. (Repealed by Gloucester to Bristol Road and Branches Act 1821 (1 & 2 Geo. 4. c. lxxxii))
Duke of Newcastle's Estate Act 1800	39 & 40 Geo. 3. c. lxxvii	20 June 1800
An Act to empower the Guardians of the Mofst Noble Henry Duke of Newcastle, an Infant, to grant Leases of certain Parts of his Estates in the County of Nottingham.
Hicks' Estate Act 1800	39 & 40 Geo. 3. c. lxxviii	20 June 1800
An Act for vesting certain detached Parts of the Estates devised by the Will of Michael Hicks Esquire, in the Counties of Essex, Norfolk, Suffolk, and Gloucester, and in London, in Trustees for carrying into Execution certain Agreements for Sale of Parts thereof, and to sell the other Parts thereof, and to apply the Money arising from such Sales in the Purchase of other Estates in the said County of Gloucester, to be settled to the same Uses.
Powney's Estate Act 1800	39 & 40 Geo. 3. c. lxxix	20 June 1800
An Act for vesting the Estates of Penyston Portlock Powney Esquire, deceased, situate in the County of Berks, in Trustees, to be sold, for paying Incumbrances and Debts, and for laying out the Surplus under the Directions of the Court of Chancery in the Purchase of other Estates, to be conveyed to the Trustees of the Will of the said Penyston Portlock Powney, in lieu thereof.
Chichester Cathedral and Selsey and Peachey Estates Act 1800	39 & 40 Geo. 3. c. lxxx	20 June 1800
An Act for effecting an Exchange between the Dean and Chapter of the Cathedral Church of the Holy Trinity of Chichester, and the Right Honourable James Lord Selsey, and the Honourable John Peachey, of certain Messuages, Lands, and Hereditaments, in the County of Sussex.
Earl of Guilford's Estate Act 1800	39 & 40 Geo. 3. c. lxxxi	20 June 1800
An Act for more effectually vesting and facilitating the raising of a Sum of ten thousand Pounds, which, by the Settlement of the Family Estates of the Right Honourable George Augustus Earl of Guilford, was provided for the Portions of his younger Children, in and for the Benefit of the Honourable Lady Maria North, (the only Child of the said Earl by the Right Honourable Maria Countess of Guilford, his late Wife,) if she shall live to attain the Age of twenty one Years, or to be married.
Jervoise's Estate Act 1800	39 & 40 Geo. 3. c. lxxxii	20 June 1800
An Act for vesting Part of the Estates devised by the Will of Tristram Huddlestone Jervoise Esquire, in Trustees, to be sold, and for laying out the Money to arise therefrom, under the Direction of the Court of Chancery, in the Purchase of other Estates to be settled in lieu thereof, and to the same Uses.
Child's Estate Act 1800	39 & 40 Geo. 3. c. lxxxiii	20 June 1800
An Act for vesting Part of the Personal Estate of Robert Child Esquire, deceased, in the Purchase of an Estate, situate near Osterley Park, in the County of Middlesex, to be settled upon the Trusts, and for the Purposes therein mentioned.
Dormer's Estate Act 1800	39 & 40 Geo. 3. c. lxxxiv	20 June 1800
An Act for vesting the Settled Estates of Sir Clement Cottrell Dormer, which were devised by the Will of William Phillips Lee Esquire, in Trustees, to be sold, and for laying out the Money arising thereby in the Purchase of other Estates, to be settled in lieu thereof, and to the same Uses, and for other Purposes.
Llanfwrog Inclosure Act 1800	39 & 40 Geo. 3. c. lxxxv	20 June 1800
An Act for dividing, allotting, and inclosing, the Commons and Waste Lands, within the Parish of Llanfwrog, in the County of Denbigh.
Walton-upon-Thames and Walton Leigh Inclosure Act 1800	39 & 40 Geo. 3. c. lxxxvi	20 June 1800
An Act for dividing, allotting, and inclosing, the Open Common Fields, Meadows, Pastures, Commons, and Waste Lands, in the Parish of Walton upon Thames, and the Manor of Walton Leigh, in the County of Surrey.
Byfleet and Weybridge Inclosures Act 1800	39 & 40 Geo. 3. c. lxxxvii	20 June 1800
An Act for dividing, allotting, and inclosing, the Open Common Fields, Meadows and Pastures, Commons and Waste Lands, in the Parishes of Byfleet and Weybridge, and Manor of Byfleet, with its Members, in the County of Surrey.
Glasgow City Extension and Improvement Act 1800 or the Glasgow Police Act 1800	39 & 40 Geo. 3. c. lxxxviii	30 June 1800
An Act for extending the Royalty of the City of Glasgow over certain adjacent Lands; for paving, lighting, and cleansing the Streets; for regulating the Police, and appointing Officers and Watchmen; for dividing the City into Wards, and appointing Commissioners; and for raising Funds, and for giving certain Powers to the Magistrates and Council, and Town and Dean of Guild Courts, for the above and other Purposes.
Bank of England Act 1800 (repealed)	39 & 40 Geo. 3. c. lxxxix	30 June 1800
An Act to empower the Governor and Company of the Bank of England to purchase certain Houses and Grounds contiguous to the Bank of England, and to enable them to improve several Avenues adjacent thereto. (Repealed by Statute Law (Repeals) Act 1995 (c. 44))
Bedford Level (Cam, Ouse and Mildenhall Rivers) Drainage Act 1800	39 & 40 Geo. 3. c. xc	30 June 1800
An Act to explain, amend, and render more effectual, two Acts made in the thirty-first Year of the Reign of King George the Second, (Note: Bedford Level Drainage Act 1757 (31 Geo. 2. c. 18)) and in the twenty-ninth Year of the Reign of his present Majesty, (Note: Bedford Level Act 1789 (29 Geo. 3. c. 22)) for draining and preserving certain Fen Lands and Low Grounds in the Isle of Ely, and County of Cambridge, between the Cam, otherwise Grant, Ouse, and Mildenhall Rivers, and bounded on the South-east by the hard Lands of Isleham, Fordham, Soham, and Wicken; and for empowering the Governor, Bailiffs, and Commonalty of the Company of Conservators of the Great Level of the Fens, called Bedford Level to sell certain Lands within the said Limits, commonly called Invested Lands; and for laying certain Rates on Vessels navigated upon the said Rivers, towards supporting the Banks thereof.
Bedford Level (North Level, Fourth District) Drainage Act 1800	39 & 40 Geo. 3. c. xci	30 June 1800
An Act for better draining and preserving the Lands and Grounds in the Fourth District of the North Level, Part of the Great Level of the Fens called Bedford Level; and for amending and rendering more effectual an Act, passed in the twenty-seventh Year of the Reign of his late Majesty King George the Second, (Note: Bedford Level Act 1754 (27 Geo. 2. c. 19)) so far as relates to the said Fourth District.
Rea Drainage and Worthen Inclosure Act 1800	39 & 40 Geo. 3. c. xcii	30 June 1800
An Act for dividing, allotting, and inclosing, certain Waste Lands, in the Manor of Worthen, and the Manors or Townships of Aston Pigot and Aston Rogers, in the Parish of Worthen, in the County of Salop, and for draining, and otherwise improving, certain inclosed Lands adjoining or near a certain Rivulet and Brook called The Rea, commencing at or near a certain Piece of Water called Marton Pool, on the Confines of the Parish of Chirbury, and extending through the said Parish of Worthen, to a Bridge across the said River, called Horse Bridge, on the Confines of the Parish of Westbury, in the said County, and sundry Streams or Brooks emptying themselves thereinto.
Kidderminster Roads Act 1800 (repealed)	39 & 40 Geo. 3. c. xciii	30 June 1800
An Act for continuing for twenty-one Years, and from thence to the End of the then next Session of Parliament, the Term, and altering and enlarging the Powers, of an Act, passed in the seventeenth Year of the Reign of his present Majesty, (Note: Kidderminster Roads Act 1777 (17 Geo. 3. c. 75)) for more effectually amending, widening, and keeping in Repair, several Roads leading from the Market House, in the Town of Kidderminster, in the County of Worcester, and several other Roads therein mentioned. (Repealed by Kidderminster Roads Act 1821 (1 & 2 Geo. 4. c. xci))
Parkhouse (Lanarkshire) Roads Act 1800 (repealed)	39 & 40 Geo. 3. c. xciv	30 June 1800
An Act for enlarging the Term and Powers of so much of an Act, passed in the thirty-fourth Year of his present Majesty's Reign, (Note: Glasgow and Renfrew Roads Act 1794 (34 Geo. 3. c. 140)) for repairing several Roads leading into the City of Glasgow, as relates to the Road from Parkhouse, to or near the Three Mile House, in the County of Lanark. (Repealed by Glasgow and Lanark Road Act 1843 (6 & 7 Vict. c. xxxix))
Hundred House (Worcestershire) Roads Act 1800	39 & 40 Geo. 3. c. xcv	30 June 1800
An Act for more effectually amending, widening, improving, and keeping in Repair, several Roads leading from the Hundred House, in the County of Worcester, and also several other Roads therein mentioned.
Road from Gloucester to the Bristol Road Act 1800	39 & 40 Geo. 3. c. xcvi	30 June 1800
An Act for enlarging the Term and Powers of an Act, made in the nineteenth Year of the Reign of his present Majesty, (Note: Gloucester Roads Act 1779 (19 Geo. 3. c. 93)) for amending and keeping in Repair, the Road from a certain Bridge over a Brook or Stream called Sudbrook, near the City of Gloucester, to the Nine Mile Stone on the Bristol Road, at or near a Place called The Clay Pits, in the County of Gloucester.
Gloucester and Stroud Road Act 1800 (repealed)	39 & 40 Geo. 3. c. xcvii	30 June 1800
An Act for enlarging the Term and Powers of an Act, made in the eighteenth Year of the Reign of his present Majesty, (Note: Gloucester to Stroud Road Act 1778 (18 Geo. 3. c. 98)) for repairing and widening the Road from the City of Gloucester to the Town of Stroud, in the County of Gloucester. (Repealed by Stroud, Painswick and Gloucester Road Act 1854 (17 & 18 Vict. c. xcv))
Blake's Estate Act 1800	39 & 40 Geo. 3. c. xcviii	30 June 1800
An Act for vesting Part of the settled Estates devised by the Will of Sir Patrick Blake Baronet, deceased, situate and being in the Counties of Middlesex and Suffolk, in Trustees, to be sold for Payment of Incumbrances affecting the same Estates, under the Direction of the Court of Chancery, and for laying out the Surplus of the Purchase Money in other Estates, upon the Trusts and for the Purposes therein expressed.
Hotham's Estate Act 1800	39 & 40 Geo. 3. c. xcix	30 June 1800
An Act for vesting Part of the Estates devised by the Will of Sir Richard Hotham Knight, deceased, in Trustees, to be sold, for Payment of Incumbrances, and for laying out the Surplus Monies in other Estates, to be settled in lieu thereof, and to the same Uses.
Rastall's Estate Act 1800	39 & 40 Geo. 3. c. c	30 June 1800
An Act for Sale of certain Estates in the Parishes of Claypole, Great Ponton, and Kirton, in the County of Lincoln, devised by the Will of the Reverend William Rastall, Doctor in Divinity, and for laying out the Money arising by Sale thereof in the Purchase of other Estates, to be settled to the same Uses, and for other Purposes in the said Act mentioned.
Wright's Estate Act 1800	39 & 40 Geo. 3. c. ci	30 June 1800
An Act for enabling the Tenants for Life, under the Will of the late William Wright Esquire, to convey in Fee, or grant Leases for long Terms of Years, for the Purpose of Building of Part of the Estates devised by the said Will, in the Counties Palatine of Chester and Lancaster.
Pigot and Fisher Diamond Lottery Act 1800 (repealed)	39 & 40 Geo. 3. c. cii	2 July 1800
An Act to enable Sir George Pigot Baronet, Margaret Fisher, and Frances Pigot, to dispose of a certain Diamond therein mentioned by a Lottery. (Repealed by Statute Law (Repeals) Act 2013 (c. 2))
Duke of Richmond's Annuity Act 1800	39 & 40 Geo. 3. c. ciii	2 July 1800
An Act for enabling the Most Noble Charles Duke of Richmond, and the Duke of Richmond for the Time being, to charge with Jointures the Annuity of nineteen thousand Pounds, (payable out of the Consolidated Fund, in lieu of the Coal Duty granted by King Charles the Second to Charles first Duke of Richmond, and the Heirs of his Body,) and the Stocks on Transfer of which the said Annuity is made redeemable, and for enabling the Sale of Part of the said Stocks, and investing the Money arising from any such Sale in the Purchase of Manors, Lands, and Hereditaments, and for other Purposes.
City of London Court of Requests Act 1800 (repealed)	39 & 40 Geo. 3. c. civ	9 July 1800
An Act to explain, amend, and render more effectual an Act, passed in the third Year of the Reign of King James the First, intituled, "An Act for the recovering of small Debts, and for the relieving of poor Debtors in London;" (Note: City of London Court of Conscience Act 1605 (3 Jas. 1. c. 15)) and an Act, passed in the fourteenth Year of the Reign of his late Majesty King George the Second, (Note: Small Debts (London) Act 1740 (14 Geo. 2. c. 10)) to explain and amend the above-mentioned Act; and likewise for extending the Powers of the Court of Requests in the City of London, in and by the said two several Acts continued and established. (Repealed by City of London Court of Requests Act 1835 (5 & 6 Will. 4. c. xciv))
St. Mary's Chapel, Caernarvon Act 1800	39 & 40 Geo. 3. c. cv	9 July 1800
An Act for taking down, and re-building upon a more enlarged Scale, the Chapel of Saint Mary, in the Town or Caernarvon.
Hunter Street Church, Liverpool Act 1800	39 & 40 Geo. 3. c. cvi	9 July 1800
An Act for establishing a new Church of Chapel (Note: Christ Church, Hunter Street, Liverpool.) lately erected on the South Side of Hunter Street, within the Town and Parish of Liverpool, in the County Palatine of Lancaster.
Neath River and Harbour Act 1800	39 & 40 Geo. 3. c. cvii	9 July 1800
An Act for the Appointment and Regulation of Pilots and Hoblers for the conducting of Ships and Vessels into and out of the Port or Harbour and River of Neath, in the County of Glamorgan; for placing Buoys upon the Bar of Neath, and the Removal of Obstructions in the said Port or Harbour and River; for regulating the Mooring Ships and Vessels therein; and for the Regulation of Porters within the said Port or Harbour and River, and within the Town of Neath.
Itchen Navigation Act 1800	39 & 40 Geo. 3. c. cviii	9 July 1800
An Act for altering and amending an Act, made in the thirty-fifth Year of his present Majesty's Reign, intituled, "An Act for making and maintaining a Navigable Canal from the Town and County of the Town of Southampton, to the City of New Sarum, in the County of Wilts, with a Collateral Branch to Northam, within the Liberties of the Town of Southampton." (Note: Southampton to New Sarum Canal Act 1795 (35 Geo. 3. c. 51))
Horncastle Navigation Act 1800	39 & 40 Geo. 3. c. cix	9 July 1800
An Act for enabling the Horncastle Navigation Company to raise a further Sum of Money to complete the said Navigation, and for amending an Act, passed in the thirty-second Year of the Reign of his present Majesty, (Note: Tattershall Canal Act 1792 (32 Geo. 3. c. 107)) for making and maintaining the said Navigation.
Essex and Middlesex Roads Act 1800 (repealed)	39 & 40 Geo. 3. c. cx	9 July 1800
An Act for continuing for Twenty-one Years, and from thence to the End of the then next Session of Parliament, the Term, and enlarging the Powers of two Acts, passed in the twenty-seventh Year of the Reign of his late Majesty King George the Second, (Note: Ratcliff Highway Act 1754 (27 Geo. 2. c. 40)) and the fifth Year of the Reign of his present Majesty, (Note: Ratcliffe Highway Act 1765 (5 Geo. 3. c. 103)) for opening, making, widening, and keeping in Repair, a Road from Ratcliff Highway, through Cannon Street, in the County of Middlesex, into the Road leading into the County of Essex, and also from the West End of Brook Street into Cable Street, and from Upper Shadwell Street, into the Back Lane, of the said County of Middlefex. (Repealed by Commercial and East India and Barking Roads Act 1828 (9 Geo. 4. c. cxii))
Keighley and Kendal Road Act 1800 (repealed)	39 & 40 Geo. 3. c. cxi	9 July 1800
An Act for continuing for twenty-one Years, and from thence to the End of the then next Session of Parliament, the Term, and altering and enlarging the Powers of two Acts, (Note: Yorkshire and Westmorland Roads Act 1753 (26 Geo. 2. c. 86)) (Note: Keighley to Kirkby Kendal Road Act 1778 (18 Geo. 3. c. 113)) passed for repairing, amending, and widening, the Road from Keighley, in the West Riding of the County of York, to Kirkby in Kendal, in the County of Westmorland, so far as the same relate to that Part of the said Road which lies within the Counties of Westmorland and Lancaster. (Repealed by Ireby, Kirkby Lonsdale, Kirkby Kendal and Milnthorp Road Act 1819 (59 Geo. 3. c. xviii))
Sutton and Povey Cross Road Act 1800 (repealed)	39 & 40 Geo. 3. c. cxii	9 July 1800
An Act for continuing for twenty-one Years, and from thence to the End of the then next Session of Parliament, the Term, and altering and enlarging the Powers of two Acts, passed in the twenty-eighth Year of the Reign of his late Majesty King George the Second, (Note: Sutton and Reigate Road Act 1755 (28 Geo. 2. c. 28)) and in the tenth Year of the Reign of his present Majesty, (Note: Surrey and Sussex Roads (No. 3) Act 1770 (10 Geo. 3. c. 84)) for repairing and widening the Road from Sutton, in the County of Surrey, through the Borough of Reigate, by Sidlow Mill, to Povey Cross, and several other Roads therein mentioned, in the same County. (Repealed by Sutton (Surrey), Reigate and Povey Cross Road Act 1815 (55 Geo. 3. c. xlviii))
Marquis of Downshire's Estate Act 1800	39 & 40 Geo. 3. c. cxiii	9 July 1800
An Act for vesting Part of the settled Estates of the Honourable Arthur Marquis of Downshire, in the Kingdom of Ireland, and Earl of Hillsborough, in the Kingdom of England, in Trustees, to be sold, and for laying out the Money arising thereby in the Purchase of other Estates, to be settled in Lieu thereof, and to the same Uses, and for other Purposes.
Brigges' Estate Act 1800	39 & 40 Geo. 3. c. cxiv	9 July 1800
An Act for the Partition of divers Estates of the late Sir Humprey Brigges Baronet, in which the Right Honourable Richard Viscount Fitzwilliam, in the Kingdom of Ireland, the Reverend Richard Huntley and George Brooke Esquire, have undivided Shares.
Pitt's Estate Act 1800	39 & 40 Geo. 3. c. cxv	9 July 1800
An Act for confirming a Partition made of the Estates of the late Humphrey Pitt Esquire, and certain Powers of Sale, mentioned in the Partition Deeds.
Ysceifiog and Nannerch Inclosures Act 1800	39 & 40 Geo. 3. c. cxvi	9 July 1800
An Act for dividing, allotting, and inclosing, the Commons and Waste Lands in the Parish of Ysceifiog, in the County of Flint, and in the Parish of Nannerch, in the Counties of Flint and Denbigh.
Scrase's Estate Act 1800	39 & 40 Geo. 3. c. cxvii	30 May 1800
An Act for enabling Trustees to enfranchise Copyhold Messuages or Tenements in the Manor of Brighthelmston, in the County of Sussex, and to grant Leases of certain other Tenements within the said Manor, devised by the Will of the late Charles Scrase Esquire, deceased.
Muston (Yorkshire), &c., Drainage (Rivers Derwent and Harford) Act 1800	39 & 40 Geo. 3. c. cxviii	28 July 1800
An Act for draining, embanking, and preserving, divers Tracts of Land within the Township of Musten, in the Parish of Hunmanby, and also within sundry other Parishes, Townships, or Places adjoining, or near to the Rivers Derwent and Harford, in the East and North Ridings of the County of York.
Cooksey's Estate Act 1800	39 & 40 Geo. 3. c. cxix	28 July 1800
An Act for effectuating a Partition or Division of certain Freehold and Copyhold, or Customary, Messuages, Lands, and Hereditaments, in the County of Worcester, heretofore the Estates of Holland Cooksey, Esquire, deceased. and for substituting Thomas Bird, Gentleman, to be a Trustee in the Place of William Dowdeswell, Esquire, now in Parts beyond the Sea, for all the Purposes for which the said William Dowdeswell, jointly with Thomas Blayney, Gentleman, is a Trustee of One undivided Fifth Part of the said Freehold and Copyhold, or Customary, Messuages, Lands, and Hereditaments.
Whitford Inclosure Act 1800	39 & 40 Geo. 3. c. cxx	28 July 1800
An Act for dividing, allotting, and inclosing the Commons, Waste Lands, and Marshes in the Parish of Whitford, in the County of Flint, and for fencing the said Marshes.

=== Private acts ===
Short title	Citation	Royal assent
Long title
Tilbrook Inclosure Act 1800	39 & 40 Geo. 3. c. 1 Pr.	28 February 1800
An Act for dividing, allotting, and inclosing, the Common and Open Fields, Meadows, Commonable Lands, and Waste Grounds, within the Parish of Tilbrooke, in the County of Bedford.
Islip Inclosure Act 1800	39 & 40 Geo. 3. c. 2 Pr.	28 February 1800
An Act for dividing, allotting, and inclosing, the Common and Open Fields, Meadows, Commonable Lands, and Waste Grounds, within the Parish of Islip, in the County of Northampton.
Salhouse Inclosure Act 1800	39 & 40 Geo. 3. c. 3 Pr.	25 March 1800
An Act for dividing, allotting, and inclosing, the Commons and Waste Grounds, within the Parish of Salhouse, in the County of Norfolk.
Langley Inclosure Act 1800	39 & 40 Geo. 3. c. 4 Pr.	25 March 1800
An Act for dividing, allotting, and inclosing, the Commons and Waste Grounds, within the Parish of Langley, in the County of Norfolk.
Cawston Inclosure Act 1800	39 & 40 Geo. 3. c. 5 Pr.	25 March 1800
An Act for dividing, allotting, and inclosing, the Common Fields, Half Year or Shack Lands, Warren Commons, Commonable Lands, and Waste Grounds, within the Parish of Cawston, in the County of Norfolk.
Locking Inclosure Act 1800	39 & 40 Geo. 3. c. 6 Pr.	25 March 1800
An Act for dividing, allotting, and inclosing, the Moor, Commons, and Waste Lands, lying within the Manor and Parish of Locking, in the County of Somerset.
Bythorn Inclosure Act 1800	39 & 40 Geo. 3. c. 7 Pr.	25 March 1800
An Act for dividing, allotting, and inclosing, the Common and Open Fields, Meadows, Commonable Lands, and Waste Grounds, in the Parish of Bythorn, in the County of Huntingdon.
Thorpe Inclosure Act 1800	39 & 40 Geo. 3. c. 8 Pr.	25 March 1800
An Act for dividing, allotting, and inclosing, the Commons and Waste Grounds, within the Parish of Thorpe next Norwich, in the County of Norfolk, and in the County of the City of Norwich.
Snettisham Inclosure Act 1800	39 & 40 Geo. 3. c. 9 Pr.	4 April 1800
An Act for inclosing, dividing, and allotting, two certain Tracts of Land now held and used as Stinted Common of Pasture within the Parish of Snettisham, in the County of Norfolk.
Wendlebury Inclosure Act 1800	39 & 40 Geo. 3. c. 10 Pr.	4 April 1800
An Act for dividing, allotting, and inclosing, the Open and Common Arable Meadow, Ley Pasture, and Waste Lands, within the Parish of Wendlebury, in the County of Oxford.
East Horsley Inclosure Act 1800	39 & 40 Geo. 3. c. 11 Pr.	4 April 1800
An Act for separating the Commons or Waste Grounds of the Manor of East Horseley, in the County of Surrey, which lie in the several Parishes of East Horseley and Ockham, within the said Manor, and for fettling the Rights of Common thereon.
Bloxham Inclosure Act 1800	39 & 40 Geo. 3. c. 12 Pr.	4 April 1800
An Act for dividing, allotting, and inclosing, the Open and Common Fields, Common Pastures, Common Meadows, and other Commonable Lands, lying within the Parish of Bloxham, in the County of Oxford.
Martin-with-Grafton Inclosure Act 1800	39 & 40 Geo. 3. c. 13 Pr.	4 April 1800
An Act for dividing, and inclosing several Open Fields and Commons or Waste Grounds, within the Parish of Martin with Grafton, in the County of York.
Burliscombe Inclosure Act 1800	39 & 40 Geo. 3. c. 14 Pr.	4 April 1800
An Act for dividing, allotting, and inclosing, the Commons and Waste Lands within the Parish of Burliscombe, in the County of Devon.
Skelmanthorpe Inclosure Act 1800	39 & 40 Geo. 3. c. 15 Pr.	24 April 1800
An Act for dividing, allotting, and inclosing, the several Parcels of Common, Moor, and Waste Grounds, within the Manor of Skelmanthorpe, in the West Riding of the County of York.
Normanton-upon-Trent Inclosure Act 1800	39 & 40 Geo. 3. c. 16 Pr.	24 April 1800
An Act for dividing, allotting, regulating and inclosing the Open Fields, Meadows, Pastures, Commons, and Waste Grounds, within the Parish of Normanton upon Trent, in the County of Nottingham.
Legge's and Sheldon's Estates Act 1800	39 & 40 Geo. 3. c. 17 Pr.	16 May 1800
An Act for vesting in Heneage Legge and William Sheldon Esquires, divers Freehold Lands and Hereditaments, in the Parish of Saint Mary Magdalen Bermondsey, in the County of Surrey, late the Estate of Sarah West Widow, and conveyed by her to Joseph Martin Esquire, and Beriah Hills Gentleman, by Indentures of Lease and Release, bearing Date respectively the twentieth and twenty-first Days of March one thousand seven hundred and seventy-four, upon several Trusts, and for enabling the said Heneage Legge and William Sheldon, to execute such of the same Trusts as are now subsisting.
Leverton Rectory Act 1800	39 & 40 Geo. 3. c. 18 Pr.	16 May 1800
An Act for uniting the North Mediety (Note: The dictionary definition of mediety at Wiktionary) of the Rectory of Leverton, in the County of Lincoln, with the South Mediety of the same Rectory, from and after the next Avoidance of either Benefice.
Milton Inclosure Act 1800	39 & 40 Geo. 3. c. 19 Pr.	16 May 1800
An Act for dividing, allotting, inclosing, and laying in Severalty, the Common and Open Fields, Common Meadows, Commonable Lands, Commons and Waste Grounds, within the Parish of Milton, in the County of Cambridge.
Ashby Woulds Inclosure Act 1800	39 & 40 Geo. 3. c. 20 Pr.	16 May 1800
An Act for dividing, allotting, and inclosing, the Common or Waste Ground called Ashby Woulds, in the Manor and Parish of Ashby-de-la-Zouch, in the County of Leicester.
Stoke-upon-Tern, &c. Inclosure Act 1800	39 & 40 Geo. 3. c. 21 Pr.	16 May 1800
An Act for dividing, allotting, and inclosing, certain Commons and Waste Lands, in the Parishes of Stoke-upon-Tern and Hinstock, in the County of Salop.
Denby Inclosure Act 1800	39 & 40 Geo. 3. c. 22 Pr.	16 May 1800
An Act for dividing, allotting, and inclosing, the Open Common Field, or Mesne Inclosure, Commons, Moors, and Waste Grounds, within the Manor of Denby, otherwise Denby with Clayton West, in the West Riding of the County of York.
Over and Nether Dean Inclosure Act 1800	39 & 40 Geo. 3. c. 23 Pr.	16 May 1800
An Act for dividing, allotting, and inclosing the Common and Open Fields, Meadows, Commonable Land, and Waste Grounds, within the Parish of Over and Nether Dean, in the County of Bedford.
Welford Inclosure Act 1800	39 & 40 Geo. 3. c. 24 Pr.	16 May 1800
An Act for dividing, allotting, and inclosing, the and Common Fields, Common Pastures, and Meadows within such Part of the Parish of Welford as is within the County of Gloucester.
Tanfield Inclosure Act 1800	39 & 40 Geo. 3. c. 25 Pr.	16 May 1800
An Act for dividing, allotting, and inclosing a Common called Tanfield Moor, in the Parish of Chester-le-Street, in the County of Durham.
Farndish Inclosure Act 1800	39 & 40 Geo. 3. c. 26 Pr.	16 May 1800
An Act for dividing, allotting, and inclosing the Open and Common Fields, Meadows, Commonable Lands, and Waste Grounds, in the Parish of Farndish, in the Counties of Bedford and Northampton, or one of them.
Ryhall Inclosure Act 1800	39 & 40 Geo. 3. c. 27 Pr.	16 May 1800
An Act for dividing, allotting, and inclosing, the Open and Common Fields, Meadows, Commonable Lands, and Waste Grounds, within the Parish of Ryhall with Belmesthorpe, otherwise Belminthorpe, in the County of Rutland.
Ovington Inclosure Act 1800	39 & 40 Geo. 3. c. 28 Pr.	16 May 1800
An Act for dividing, allotting, and inclosing, the Whole Year Lands, Open Fields, Commons, Commonable Wood Grounds, and other Commonable and Waste Lands, within the Parish of Ovington, in the County of Norfolk.
Barnack with Pilsgate Inclosure Act 1800	39 & 40 Geo. 3. c. 29 Pr.	16 May 1800
An Act for dividing, allotting, and inclosing, the Open and Common Fields, Meadows, Commonable Lands, and Waste Grounds, within the Parish of Barnack with Pilsgate, in the County of Northampton.
Tholthorpe, &c. Inclosure Act 1800	39 & 40 Geo. 3. c. 30 Pr.	16 May 1800
An Act for dividing, allotting, and inclosing, the Open Fields, Ings, Commons, and Waste Grounds, within the Townships of Tholthorpe and Flawith, in the Parish of Alne, in the North Riding of the County of York.
Columbine's Divorce Act 1800	39 & 40 Geo. 3. c. 31 Pr.	16 May 1800
An Act to dissolve the Marriage of Edward Henry Columbine Esquire, with Anna Maria Starr, his now Wife, and to enable him to marry again, and for other Purposes therein mentioned.
Shalbourn Inclosure Act 1800	39 & 40 Geo. 3. c. 32 Pr.	30 May 1800
An Act for dividing, allotting, and laying in Severalty, the Open and Common Lands and Grounds, within the Parith of Shalbourn, in the Counties of Wilts and Berks.
Poringland, &c. Inclosure Act 1800	39 & 40 Geo. 3. c. 33 Pr.	30 May 1800
An Act for dividing, allotting, and inclosing, the Commons and Waste Grounds, in the Parishes of East Poringland, West Poringland, Framingham Earl, Framingham Pigot, Bixley, Armeringhall, Stoke Holy Cross, and Caister Saint Edmund, in the County of Norfolk; and for making a Compensation for the Tythes arising in the said Parishes of East Poringland, Framingham Earl, and Bixley.
Wrawby-cum-Brigg Inclosure Act 1800	39 & 40 Geo. 3. c. 34 Pr.	30 May 1800
An Act for dividing, alloting, and inclosing, the Open Fields, Meadows, Pastures, Moors, Carrs, and other Commonable Lands and Waste Grounds, in the Parish of Wrawby-cum-Brigg, in the County of Lincoln.
Brooke Inclosure Act 1800	39 & 40 Geo. 3. c. 35 Pr.	30 May 1800
An Act for dividing and inclosing the Commons, Fen Grounds, and Waste Lands, within the Parish of Brooke, in the County of Norfolk.
Newton Bromshold and Higham Ferrers Inclosure Act 1800	39 & 40 Geo. 3. c. 36 Pr.	30 May 1800
An Act for dividing and inclosing the Open and Conmon Fields, Common Meadows, Commonable Lands, and Waste Grounds, within the Parish of Newton Bromshold, in the County of Northampton, and also such of the Open Fields, and other Commonable Lands, within the Parish of Higham Ferrers, in the said County of Northampton, as are called or known by the Names of The Buscotts and No Man's Leys.
Barholm Inclosure Act 1800	39 & 40 Geo. 3. c. 37 Pr.	30 May 1800
An Act for dividing, allotting, and inclosing, the Open and Common Fields, Meadows, Pastures, and Waste Grounds, in the Lordship of Barholm, in the County of Lincoln.
Womersley Inclosure Act 1800	39 & 40 Geo. 3. c. 38 Pr.	30 May 1800
An Act for dividing, inclosing, and improving the several Open Arable Fields, Ings, Pastures, Commons, and Waste Grounds, within the Township of Womersley, in the West Riding of the County of York.
Hertford Inclosure Act 1800	39 & 40 Geo. 3. c. 39 Pr.	30 May 1800
An Act for dividing, allotting, and inclosing, certain Open and Common Fields and Waste Lands, within the Parish of Saint John Hertford, and the Liberty of Brickendon, in the Parish of All Saints Hertford, in the County Hertford.
Wolseley's Estate Act 1800	39 & 40 Geo. 3. c. 40 Pr.	20 June 1800
An Act for vesting the Manor of Moreton, and divers Messuages, Lands, and Hereditaments in Moreton in the County of Stafford, devised by the Will of Sir William Wolseley Baronet, deceased, in Trustees, to be sold, and for the Application of the Money to arise from Sale, and for other Purposes.
Wood's Estate Act 1800	39 & 40 Geo. 3. c. 41 Pr.	20 June 1800
An Act for vesting Part of the settled Estates of Richard Wood Esquire, in Trustees, to be sold, and for laying out the Monies in the Purchase of other Estates, to be settled in Lieu thereof, to the same Uses, and for other Purposes.
Little Plumstead Inclosure Act 1800	39 & 40 Geo. 3. c. 42 Pr.	20 June 1800
An Act for dividing, allotting, and inclosing the Commons and Waste Grounds within the Parish of Little Plumstead in the County of Norfolk.
Holmpton Inclosure Act 1800	39 & 40 Geo. 3. c. 43 Pr.	20 June 1800
An Act for dividing, allotting, and inclosing the Open Fields and Waste Ground within the Township of Holmpton, in the Parishes of Holmpton and Hollym cum Withernsea, in Holderness, in the East Riding of the County of York.
Newark-upon-Trent Inclosure Act 1800	39 & 40 Geo. 3. c. 44 Pr.	20 June 1800
An Act for dividing and inclosing the Open Common Fields, Meadows, and Waste Lands in the Parish of Newark upon Trent, in the County of Nottingham.
Kellington Inclosure Act 1800	39 & 40 Geo. 3. c. 45 Pr.	20 June 1800
An Act for dividing, allotting, and inclosing the several Open Fields, Meadows, Commons, and Wastes, in the Vills or Hamlets of High Egbrough, Low Egbrough, Sherwood, Hutgreen, and Tranmoor, in the Parish of Kellington, in the West Riding of the County of York.
Carlton and Camblesforth Inclosure Act 1800	39 & 40 Geo. 3. c. 46 Pr.	20 June 1800
An Act for dividing, allotting, and inclosing the Open Common Fields, Ings, Marshes, Common, Commonable Lands, and Waste Grounds within the Manor and Township of Carlton in the Parish of Snaith, and the Manor and Township of Camblesforth, in the Parish of Drax, in the West Riding of the County of York.
Sprowston Inclosure Act 1800	39 & 40 Geo. 3. c. 47 Pr.	20 June 1800
An Act for dividing, allotting, and inclosing the Commons and Waste Grounds within the Parish of Sprowston in the County of Norfolk.
Noman's Moor Inclosure Act 1800	39 & 40 Geo. 3. c. 48 Pr.	20 June 1800
An Act for dividing and inclosing Noman's Moor, otherwise Norman's Moor, within the North Riding of the County of York.
Thurstonland Inclosure Act 1800	39 & 40 Geo. 3. c. 49 Pr.	20 June 1800
An Act for dividing, allotting, and inclosing the Commons and Waste Grounds within the Manor and Township of Thurstonland, in the Parish of Kirkburton, in West Riding of the County of York.
Winterborne Inclosure Act 1800	39 & 40 Geo. 3. c. 50 Pr.	20 June 1800
An Act for dividing, allotting, and inclosing, the Open and Common Fields, Common Downs, Commons, and Waste Lands, in the Parish of Winterborne Stickland, in the County of Dorset, and for extinguishing the Tithes in the same Parish.
Hanworth, &c. Inclosure Act 1800	39 & 40 Geo. 3. c. 51 Pr.	20 June 1800
An Act for dividing, allotting, and inclosing, the Open and Common Fields, Meadows, and Pastures, and other Commonable Lands and Grounds and also the Lands and Grounds, within the several Parishes of Hanworth, Feltham, and Sunbury, in the County of Middlesex.
Kirkby Inclosure Act 1800	39 & 40 Geo. 3. c. 52 Pr.	20 June 1800
An Act for dividing, allotting, inclosing, and improving, the Open Arable Fields, Stinted Pastures, Common Pastures, Commons, and Waste Grounds, within the Township of Kearby, otherwise Kirkby, otherwise Kirby-cum-Netherby, in the Parish of Kirkby-Overblow, in the West Riding of the County of York.
Hale and Halewood Inclosure Act 1800	39 & 40 Geo. 3. c. 53 Pr.	20 June 1800
An Act for dividing, allotting, and inclosing the several Commons and Waste Lands in the Manors and Townships of Hale and Halewood, in the Parish of Childwall, in the County Palatine of Lancaster.
Braceborough Inclosure Act 1800	39 & 40 Geo. 3. c. 54 Pr.	20 June 1800
An Act for dividing, allotting, and inclosing the Open Fields, Pastures, Wastes, and other uninclosed Lands and Grounds, in the Parish of Braceborough, in the County of Lincoln, and for making Compensation for the Tithes within the same Parish.
Iver Inclosure Act 1800	39 & 40 Geo. 3. c. 55 Pr.	20 June 1800
An Act for dividing, allotting, and inclosing the Open Common Fields, Lammas Lands, Commons, Heaths, Moors, and Waste Lands, within the Parish of Iver, in the County of Buckingham.
Kerry's Name Act 1800	39 & 40 Geo. 3. c. 56 Pr.	20 June 1800
An Act to enable Justinian Kerry Esquire, and his Issue, to take the Surname and Arms of Ekins only, pursuant to the Will of Justinian Ekins Esquire, deceased.
Pulteney's Estate Act 1800	39 & 40 Geo. 3. c. 57 Pr.	30 June 1800
An Act to enable the Trustees therein named, to repair the new Bridge over the River Avon, from the City of Bath, to the Manor of Bathwick, and to raise a sufficient Sum for that Purpose by a Charge on the Trust Estates of the late General Pulteney, or to apply in that Manner certain Sums which may be payable to the said Trust Estates from the Company of Proprietors of the Kennet and Avon Canal Navigation.
Dickson's Estate Act 1800	39 & 40 Geo. 3. c. 58 Pr.	30 June 1800
An Act for empowering the Judges of the Court of Session in Scotland to sell such Part or Parts of the entailed Estate of Blairhall and others, in the Counties of Fife and Perth, belonging to Mistress Ann Ranaldson Dickson, Wife of James Ranaldson Dickson, of Blairhall, Esquire, as shall be sufficient for Payment of the Debts and Provisions to younger Children affecting the same.
Exton, &c. Inclosure Act 1800	39 & 40 Geo. 3. c. 59 Pr.	30 June 1800
An Act for dividing, allotting, and inclosing, the Open Fields, and other Commonable Lands, in the Parishes of Exton and Cottesmore with Barrow, in the County of Rutland, and for extinguishing the Tythes in those Parishes.
Cassington Inclosure Act 1800	39 & 40 Geo. 3. c. 60 Pr.	30 June 1800
An Act for dividing, allotting, and inclosing, certain Heath Lands, and Open and Common Fields, Common Pastures, and Commonable Lands, within the Parish of Cassington, in the County of Oxford, and in the Hamlet of Worton, otherwise Workton, within the said Parish.
South Hykeham Inclosure Act 1800	39 & 40 Geo. 3. c. 61 Pr.	30 June 1800
An Act for dividing and inclosing the Open Meadows, Commonable Lands, and Waste Grounds, within the Parish of South Hykeham, in the County of Lincoln, and for making Compensation to the Rector of South Hykeham aforesaid, in Lieu of the Tithes of all the Titheable Lands within the same Parish.
Guilden Morden Inclosure Act 1800	39 & 40 Geo. 3. c. 62 Pr.	30 June 1800
An Act for dividing, allotting, and inclosing, the Open and Common Fields, Meadows, Pastures, Wastes, and other Commonable Lands and Grounds, within the Parish of Guilden Morden, in the County of Cambridge.
Eynsham Inclosure Act 1800	39 & 40 Geo. 3. c. 63 Pr.	30 June 1800
An Act for dividing, allotting, and inclosing, the several Open Common Fields, Common Meadows, Common Pastures, and other Commonable Lands, and a Tract of Heath, Land within the Parish of Ensham, in the County of Oxford.
Holywell Inclosure Act 1800	39 & 40 Geo. 3. c. 64 Pr.	30 June 1800
An Act for dividing and inclosing certain Open and Common Fields, Meadows, Lands, Commons, and Commonable Places, within the Parish of Holywell with Needingworth, in the County of Huntingdon.
Horsford Inclosure Act 1800	39 & 40 Geo. 3. c. 65 Pr.	30 June 1800
An Act for dividing, allotting, and inclosing, the Half Year or Shack Lands, Warrens, Commons, Heaths, Commonable Lands, and Waste Grounds, within the Parishes of Horsford, Horsham Saint Faith's, and Hamlet of Newton Saint Faith's, in the County of Norfolk.
Elsworth Inclosure Act 1800	39 & 40 Geo. 3. c. 66 Pr.	30 June 1800
An Act for dividing and inclosing certain Open and Common Fields, Meadows, Lands, Commons, and Commonable Places, within the Parish of Elsworth, in the County of Cambridge.
Ingburchworth Inclosure Act 1800	39 & 40 Geo. 3. c. 67 Pr.	30 June 1800
An Act for dividing, allotting, and inclosing, the Commons, Moors, and Waste Grounds, within the Township of Inburchworth, in the Parish of Penistone, in the West Riding of the County of York.
Seifton Inclosure Act 1800	39 & 40 Geo. 3. c. 68 Pr.	30 June 1800
An Act for confirming and establishing the Division and Inclosure of a certain Common, or Parcel of Waste Land, called Seifton Forest, otherwise The Long Forest, within the Townships of Seifton, Bache, and Norton, in the Parish of Culmington, in the County of Salop, and certain Exchanges of Lands and Estates within the said Parish.
Wysall Inclosure Act 1800	39 & 40 Geo. 3. c. 69 Pr.	30 June 1800
An Act for dividing, allotting, and inclosing, the Open Fields, Meadows, Pastures, Commonable and Waste Lands, within the Parish of Wysall, in the County of Nottingham.
St. Mary's Stafford Inclosure Act 1800	39 & 40 Geo. 3. c. 70 Pr.	30 June 1800
An Act for dividing, allotting, and inclosing, certain Common Fields and Waste Lands, within or the Parish of Saint Mary, in Stafford, in the County Stafford.
Ordsall Inclosure Act 1800	39 & 40 Geo. 3. c. 71 Pr.	30 June 1800
An Act for dividing, allotting, and inclosing, the Open Fields, Meadow, Commons, and Waste Grounds, within the Parish of Ordsall, in the County of Nottingham.
Marcet's Naturalization Act 1800	39 & 40 Geo. 3. c. 72 Pr.	30 June 1800
An Act for naturalizing Alexander John Gaspard Marcet.
Dryden's Charity Act 1800 (repealed)	39 & 40 Geo. 3. c. 73 Pr.	7 July 1800
An Act for the Sale of the George Inn, in the Town of Northampton, vested in Trustees for Charitable Purposes under the Will of John Driden Esquire, deceased, and for investing the Money arising from the Sale thereof in the Purchase of three Pounds per Centum Consolidated Bank Annuities until a proper Purchase can be found, and in the mean Time for applying the Dividends and Produce thereof for the same Charitable Purposes, (Repealed by Northampton Act 1988 (c. xxix))
Barbor's Estate Act 1800	39 & 40 Geo. 3. c. 74 Pr.	7 July 1800
An Act to give to Trustees Powers of Sale, Exchange, and Partition, over such of the Shares of Estates comprized in the Marriage Settlement of William Barbor Esquire, as are situate in the County of Somerset, and to lay out the Money arising by such Sale in the Purchase of Estates, to be situate in the County of Devon, and to give a Power of changing and appointing new Trustees of the Estates so to be sold.
Rocester and Denston Inclosure Act 1800	39 & 40 Geo. 3. c. 75 Pr.	7 July 1800
An Act for dividing, allotting, and inclosing, the Commons and Waste Grounds, within the Parish of Rocester, and in the Township of Denston, within the Parishes of Rocester aforesaid, and Alveton, in the County of Stafford
Huntspill and Stert Common Inclosure Act 1800	39 & 40 Geo. 3. c. 76 Pr.	7 July 1800
An Act for exchanging, allotting, improving, and inclosing, certain Open and Commonable Arable Lands, within the Parish of Huntspill, in the County of Somerset, and for dividing, allotting, inclosing, and improving, a certain Open and Commonable Pasture, called Stert Common, situate in the Parish of Huntspill aforesaid, and in the Parishes of Cannington, Stockland Bristol, and Stogursey, in the said County of Somerset.
Connington Inclosure Act 1800	39 & 40 Geo. 3. c. 77 Pr.	7 July 1800
An Act for dividing, allotting, and inclosing, the Open and Common Fields, Common Pastures, Common Meadows, and other Commonable Lands and Waste Grounds, within the Parish of Connington, in the County of Cambridge.
Whitchurch Inclosure Act 1800	39 & 40 Geo. 3. c. 78 Pr.	7 July 1800
An Act for dividing, allotting, and inclosing, the Open and Common Fields, Common or Commonable Meadows, Pastures, Lands, and Grounds, and Waste Lands, in the Parish of Whitchurch, in the County of Oxford.
Edmonton Inclosure Act 1800	39 & 40 Geo. 3. c. 79 Pr.	7 July 1800
An Act for dividing and inclosing the Common, Common Fields, Common Marshes, and Waste Land, within the Parish of Edmonton, in the County of Middlesex, and for other Purposes therein mentioned.
Chirton Inclosure Act 1800	39 & 40 Geo. 3. c. 80 Pr.	7 July 1800
An Act for dividing, allotting, and inclosing, the Open and Common Fields and Downs, Common Meadows, Common Pastures, and Commonable and Waste Lands, within the Manor or Tithing of Chirton, otherwise Cherrington, in the County of Wilts.
Hunmanby and Fordon Inclosure Act 1800	39 & 40 Geo. 3. c. 81 Pr.	7 July 1800
An Act for dividing, allotting, and inclosing, the several Open Fields, Meadows, Pastures, Commons, Commonable Lands, and Waste Grounds, within the several Manors or Townships of Hunmanby and Fordon, in the Parish of Hunmanby, in the East Riding of the County of York, and for making Compensation in Lieu of Tythe arising in, over, or upon the same, and in, over, and upon, certain ancient inclosed Lands in the same Townships.
Wistinghausen's Naturalization Act 1800	39 & 40 Geo. 3. c. 82 Pr.	7 July 1800
An Act for naturalizing Frederick William Wistinghausen.
Nicolay's Naturalization Act 1800	39 & 40 Geo. 3. c. 83 Pr.	7 July 1800
An Act for naturalizing Charles Gotthold Nicolay.
Sparsholt and Westcote Inclosure Act 1800	39 & 40 Geo. 3. c. 84 Pr.	28 July 1800
An Act for dividing, allotting, laying in Severalty, and inclosing the Open and Common Arable Lands, Common Meadow, Common Pasture, Waste and Down Ground, within the Parish or Township of Sparsholt, in the County of Berks, and within the Hamlet of Westcote, in the same Parish and County.
Dedham Inclosure Act 1800	39 & 40 Geo. 3. c. 85 Pr.	28 July 1800
An Act for dividing, allotting, and inclosing, the Heaths and Commons, and for exonerating from Common Right, the Half Year Lands and Lammas Lands, within the Manors of Dedham Hall and Overhall, and Netherhall, in the Parish of Dedham, in the County of Essex.
Micheli's Naturalization Act 1800	39 & 40 Geo. 3. c. 86 Pr.	28 July 1800
An Act for naturalizing Francis Julius Micheli.
Tulliken's Naturalization Act 1800	39 & 40 Geo. 3. c. 87 Pr.	28 July 1800
An Act for naturalizing John Tulleken.
De Boubée de Brouquens's Naturalization Act 1800	39 & 40 Geo. 3. c. 88 Pr.	28 July 1800
An Act for naturalizing John Joachim Vital de Boubee de Brouquens, an Infant.
Sultzbergen's Naturalization Act 1800	39 & 40 Geo. 3. c. 89 Pr.	29 July 1800
An Act for naturalizing Johan Gotlieb Lebrecht Sultzbergen.
Vallette's Naturalization Act 1800	39 & 40 Geo. 3. c. 90 Pr.	29 July 1800
An Act for naturalizing Jean Elizabeth Grammont Vallette, Widow.

=== Sources ===
- "Anno 39° and 40° Georgii III". The Statutes at Large: From Magna Carta, to the End of the Last Parliament. Eyre and Strahan. 1800. pp. 286–533 – via Google Books.
- Journals of the House of Commons. Vol. 55. London: His Majesty's Stationery Office. 1803. pp. 3–793 – via Google Books.
- Chronological Table of and Index to the Statutes. Vol. 1: To the End of the Session 59 Vict. Sess. 2 (1895) (13th ed.). London: Her Majesty's Stationery Office. 1896. p. 166-168 – via Google Books.
- "Acts of the Parliament of Great Britain from 1800". legislation.gov.uk. The National Archives.

== See also ==
- List of acts of the Parliament of Great Britain
