= Church of Ireland Act 1824 =

Act of the Parliament of the United Kingdom

- Act of Parliament
- Parliament of the United Kingdom
- Long title: An Act to consolidate and amend the Laws for enforcing the Residence of Spiritual Persons on their Benefices; to restrain Spiritual Persons from carrying on Trade or Merchandize; and for the Support and Maintenance of Stipendiary Curates, in Ireland.
- Citation: 5 Geo. 4. c. 91
- Territorial extent: Ireland (Note: Section 83.)

Dates
- Royal assent: 21 June 1824
- Commencement: 21 June 1824 (Note: The Acts of Parliament (Commencement) Act 1793.)
Other legislation
Amends	See § Repealed enactments
Repeals/revokes	See § Repealed enactments
Relates to	Church Temporalities (Ireland) Act 1833

Status: Current legislation

Text of statute as originally enacted

The Church of Ireland Act 1824 (5 Geo. 4. c. 91) is an act of the Parliament of the United Kingdom that consolidated enactments related to Ireland.

== Provisions ==
=== Repealed enactments ===
Section 1 of the act repealed 6 enactments, listed in that section.

Citation	Short title	Description	Extent of repeal
35 Hen. 6. c. 1 (I)	N/A	One Act in the Thirty sixth Year of the Reign of His Majesty King Henry the Sixth, intituled An Act that beneficed Persons shall keep Residence.	The whole act.
10 & 11 Chas. 1. (I)	Impropriations and Tythes Restitution Act 1634	One other Act in the Tenth and Eleventh Years of the Reign of His Majesty King Charles the First, intituled An Act to enable Restitutions of Impropriations and Tithes and other Rights Ecclesiastical to the Clergy with a Restraint of aliening the same and Directions for Presentation to the Churches	As relates to Gifts, Grants Alienations, Forfeitures, Charges and Incumbrances imposed, laid or suffered by any Minister or other Beneficer therein mentioned, or by any Parson Vicar or other Beneficer having Cure of Souls, and to Residence of Spiritual Persons on their Benefices.
6 Geo. 1. c. 13 (I)	Maintenance of Curates Act 1719	One other Act in the Sixth Year of the Reign of His late Majesty King George the First, intituled An Act for the better Maintenance of Curates within the Church of Ireland.	As relates to the Maintenance of Curates within the Church of Ireland, and making Provisions for appointing Stipends for such Curates.
1 Geo. 2. c. 22 (I)	Maintenance of Curates Amendment Act 1727	One other Act in the First Year of the Reign of His Majesty King George the Second for explaining and amending the said Act of the Sixth Year of King George the First, for the better Maintenance of Curates within the Church of Ireland.	As relates to the Maintenance of Curates within the Church of Ireland, and making Provisions for appointing Stipends for such Curates.
40 Geo. 3. c. 27 (I)	Curates Maintenance Act 1800	One other Act in the Fortieth Year of the Reign of His late Majesty King George the Third, intituled An Act for the further Support and Maintenance of Curates within the Church of Ireland.	As relates to the Maintenance of Curates within the Church of Ireland, and making Provisions for appointing Stipends for such Curates.
48 Geo. 3. c. 66	Benefices (Ireland) Act 1808	An Act passed in the Parliament of the United Kingdom of Great Britain and Ireland in the Forty eighth Year of the Reign of His said late Majesty, intituled An Act for enforcing the Residence of Spiritual Persons on their Benefices in Ireland.	The whole act.
