= Church Temporalities Act 1833 =

Act of the Parliament of the United Kingdom

- Act of Parliament
- Parliament of the United Kingdom
- Long title: An Act to alter and amend the Laws relating to the Temporalities of the Church in Ireland.
- Citation: 3 & 4 Will. 4. c. 37
- Territorial extent: United Kingdom

Dates
- Royal assent: 14 August 1833
- Commencement: 14 August 1833 (Note: The Acts of Parliament (Commencement) Act 1793.)
Other legislation
Amends	See § Repealed enactments
Repeals/revokes	See § Repealed enactments
Relates to	Church of Ireland Act 1824

Status: Current legislation

Text of statute as originally enacted

The Church Temporalities Act 1833 (3 & 4 Will. 4. c. 37), sometimes called the Church Temporalities (Ireland) Act 1833, (Note: The short title in Ireland is Church Temporalities Act 1833, assigned by the Statute Law Revision Act 2007. The description "Church Temporalities (Ireland) Act 1833" was used in Hansard. The long title is "An Act to alter and amend the Laws relating to the Temporalities of the Church in Ireland.") is an act of the Parliament of the United Kingdom that undertook a major reorganisation of the Church of Ireland, then the established but demographic minority church in Ireland.

== Provisions ==
The act provided for the elimination of Vestry Assessment (church rates or "parish cess", which allowed vestries to tax the entire population) to alleviate the Tithe War, although disturbances persisted until the Tithe Commutation Act 1838 (1 & 2 Vict. c. 109). The Act also allowed for merger of dioceses effective from the next vacancies, replaced first fruits with an annual tax, and provided for the ensuing revenue to augment low clergy stipends and benefit the Church.

=== Repealed enactments ===
Section 1 of the act repealed 13 enactments, listed in that section.

Citation	Short title	Description	Extent of repeal
28 Hen. 8. c. 8 (I)	First Fruits Act 1537	An Act made in the Parliament of Ireland in the Twenty-eighth Year of the Reign of King Henry the Eighth, intituled An Act for First Fruit.	The whole act.
28 Hen. 8. c. 14 (I)	Twentieth Part of Ecclesiastical Livings Act 1537	An Act made in the Parliament of Ireland in the Twenty-eighth Year of the Reign of King Henry the Eighth, intituled An Act for the Twentieth Part.	The whole act.
28 Eliz. 1. c. 3 (I)	First Fruits and Rectories Act 1560	An Act made in the Parliament of Ireland in the of the Second Year of the Reign of Queen Elizabeth, intituled An Act for the Restitution First Fruits and Twentieth Part, and Rents reserved nomine Ten or Twenty, and of Parsonages Impropriate, to the Imperial Crown of this Realm,.	As relates to or concerns First Fruits and Twentieth Parts, or the Payment thereof
2 Geo. 1. c. 15 (I)	First Fruits Act 1715	An Act made in the Parliament of Ireland in the Second Year of the Reign of King George the First, intituled An Actfor confirming the several Grants made by Her late Majesty of the First Fruits and Twentieth Parts payable out of the Ecclesiastical Benefices in this Kingdom, and also for giving the Archbishops, Bishops, and other Ecclesiastical Persons some Years Time for the Payment ofFirst Fruits.	The whole act.
8 Geo. 1. c. 12 (I)	Clergy Residence and Protestant Schools Act 1721	An Act made in the Parliament of Ireland in the Eighth Year of the Reign of King George the First, intituled An Act for the better enabling of the Clergy having Cure of Souls to reside upon their respective Benefices, and for the Encouragement of Protestant Schools within this Kingdom of Ireland.	As relates to or concerns the Pay- ment of any Sum of Money by the Trustees of First Fruits therein mentioned.
10 Geo. 1. c. 7 (I)	First Fruits Amendment Act 1723	An Act made in the Parliament ofIreland in the Tenth Year of the Reign of King George the First, intituled An Act for amending an Act, intituled An Act for confirming the several Grants made by Her late Majesty out of the First Fruits and Twentieth Parts payable out of the Ecclesiastical Benefices in this Kingdom, ' and also for giving the Archbishops and other Ecclesiastical Persons Four Years Time for the Payment of First Fruits, and for incorporating the Trustees and Commissioners of the said First Fruits.	The whole act.
29 Geo. 2. c. 18 (I)	First-Fruits and Boulter's Bequest Act 1755	An Act made in the Parliament of Ireland in the Twenty-ninth Year of the Reign of King George the Second, intituled An Act for amending and making more effectual the several Laws relating to the First Fruits payable out of the Ecclesiastical Benefices in this Kingdom, and for the better Regulation and Management of the Charitable Bequests of Doctor Hugh Boulter, late Lord Archbishop ofArmagh, for augmenting the Maintenance of Poor Clergy in this Kingdom.	The whole act.
29 Geo. 3. c. 26 (I)	First Fruits Act 1789	An Act made in the Parliament of Ireland in the Twenty-ninth Year of the Reign of King George the Third, intituled An Act for the better enforcing the Payment of the First Fruits chargeable on the Clergy of this Kingdom	The whole act.
43 Geo. 3. c. 106	Loans for Parsonages, etc. (Ireland) Act 1803	An Act made in the Parliament of the United Kingdom in the Forty-third Year of the Reign of King George the Third, intituled An Act to enable the Commissioners of First Fruits in Ireland to lend certain Sums of Money (Interest free) to Incumbents of Benefices there, for the Purpose of enabling them to erect or purchase Glebe Houses and Offices convenient for their Residence, and to purchase Glebe Lands fit and convenient for the Erection of such Houses and Offices; and to make Provision for the Repayment of all Loans so to be made by the said Commissioners.	The whole act.
46 Geo. 3. c. 60	Small Livings (Ireland) Act 1806	An Act made in the Parliament of the United Kingdom, in the Forty-sixth Year of the Reign of His late Majesty King George the Third, intituled An Act for amending an Act passed in Ireland in the Twenty-ninth Year of King George the Second, intituled An Act for amending and making more effectual the several Laws relating to First Fruits payable out of Ecclesiastical Benefices in this Kingdom, and for the better Regulation and Management of the Charitable Bequest of Doctor Hugh Boulter, late Lord Archbishop of Armagh, for augmenting the Maintenance of Poor Clergy in this Kingdom, so far only as relates to the said Charitable Bequest.	The whole act.
48 Geo. 3. c. 65	Church Building, etc. (Ireland) Act 1808	An Act made in the Parliament of the United Kingdom in the Forty-eighth Year of the Reign of King George the Third, intituled An Act to make more effectual Provision for the building and rebuilding of Churches, Chapels, and Glebe Houses, and for the Purchase of Glebe Lands, Glebe Houses, and Impropriations in Ireland.	The whole act.
49 Geo. 3. c. 103	Building of Churches, etc. (Ireland) Act 1809	An Act made in the Parliament of the United Kingdom in the Forty-ninth Year of the Reign of King George the Third, intituled An Act to amend an ctmade in the last Session of Parliament, for making Provision for the building and rebuilding of Churches, Chapels, and Glebe Houses in Ireland.	The whole act.
4 Geo. 4. c. 86	Church of Ireland Act 1823	An Act made in the Parliament of the United Kingdom in the Fourth Year of the Reign of King George the Fourth, intituled An Act to amend the Laws for collecting Church Rates and Money advanced by the Trustees and Commissioners of the First Fruits of Ecclesiastical Benefices, and for the Improvement of Church Lands, in Ireland.	As relates to the making, applotting, raising, levying, or enforcing any Rate, Assessment, or Cess for or towards the repairing, building, or rebuilding any Churches or Chapels in Ireland, or as relates to any Loans made by the Trustees and Commissioners of the First Fruits of Ecclesiastical Benefices in Ireland, or any Instalments of Sums. payable to the said Trustees and Commissioners, or to any Proceeding concerning any of the same.

== Subsequent developments ==
At the time of the act, the Church of Ireland had 852,064 members, fewer than the bishopric of Durham alone; allegedly one third were not even residents of Ireland. By comparison the Irish population totalled 7.77 million in 1831, most of whom were Catholic. Using the act, Parliament suppressed 10 of the 22 Irish bishoprics and merged the corresponding dioceses. Many appointees in the eliminated bishoprics had no religious duties or church, and when services were performed, they had been undertaken by a curate paid only a small portion of the clergy stipend.

According to historian Stewart J. Brown, the act represented Parliament's understanding that the Church of Ireland was unlikely to expand further and thus needed to be sustained economically. The Act induced debate among the Anglican Communion about the relationship between church and state, inciting the Oxford Movement.
