= List of acts of the Parliament of the United Kingdom from 1824 =

This is a complete list of acts of the Parliament of the United Kingdom for the year 1824.

Note that the first parliament of the United Kingdom was held in 1801; parliaments between 1707 and 1800 were either parliaments of Great Britain or of Ireland). For acts passed up until 1707, see the list of acts of the Parliament of England and the list of acts of the Parliament of Scotland. For acts passed from 1707 to 1800, see the list of acts of the Parliament of Great Britain. See also the list of acts of the Parliament of Ireland.

For acts of the devolved parliaments and assemblies in the United Kingdom, see the list of acts of the Scottish Parliament, the list of acts of the Northern Ireland Assembly, and the list of acts and measures of Senedd Cymru; see also the list of acts of the Parliament of Northern Ireland.

The number shown after each act's title is its chapter number. Acts passed before 1963 are cited using this number, preceded by the year(s) of the reign during which the relevant parliamentary session was held; thus the Union with Ireland Act 1800 is cited as "39 & 40 Geo. 3 c. 67", meaning the 67th act passed during the session that started in the 39th year of the reign of George III and which finished in the 40th year of that reign. Note that the modern convention is to use Arabic numerals in citations (thus "41 Geo. 3" rather than "41 Geo. III"). Acts of the last session of the Parliament of Great Britain and the first session of the Parliament of the United Kingdom are both cited as "41 Geo. 3". Acts passed from 1963 onwards are simply cited by calendar year and chapter number.

All modern acts have a short title, e.g. the Local Government Act 2003. Some earlier acts also have a short title given to them by later acts, such as by the Short Titles Act 1896.

== 5 Geo. 4 ==
The fifth session of the 7th Parliament of the United Kingdom, which met from 3 February 1824 until 25 June 1824.

This session was also traditionally cited as 5 G. 4.

=== Public general acts ===
Short title	Citation	Royal assent
Long title
Duties on Foreign Vessels Act 1824 (repealed)	5 Geo. 4. c. 1	5 March 1824
An act to indemnify all Persons concerned in advising, issuing or acting under a certain Order in Council, for regulating the Tonnage Duties on certain Foreign Vessels; and to amend an Act of the last Session of Parliament, (Note: Importation, etc., in Foreign Vessels Act 1823 (4 Geo. 4. c. 77)) for authorizing His Majesty, under certain Circumstances, to regulate the Duties and Drawbacks on Goods imported or exported in any Foreign Vessels. (Repealed by Navigation Act 1849 (12 & 13 Vict. c. 29))
Exchequer Bills Act 1824 (repealed)	5 Geo. 4. c. 2	5 March 1824
An act for raising the Sum of Fifteen Millions by Exchequer Bills, for the Service of the Year One thousand eight hundred and twenty four. (Repealed by Statute Law Revision Act 1873 (36 & 37 Vict. c. 91))
Supply Act 1824 (repealed)	5 Geo. 4. c. 3	5 March 1824
An Act for granting and applying certain Sums of Money for the Service of the Year One thousand eight hundred and twenty four. (Repealed by Statute Law Revision Act 1873 (36 & 37 Vict. c. 91))
Law Proceedings (Ireland) Act 1824 (repealed)	5 Geo. 4. c. 4	5 March 1824
An act to amend an Act made in the First and Second Years of the Reign of His present Majesty, (Note: Common Law Procedure (Ireland) Act 1821 (1 & 2 Geo. 4. c. 53)) for regulating the Proceedings in the Civil Side of the Court of King's Bench, and also in the Court of Common Pleas, and in the Pleas or Common Law Side of the Court of Exchequer, in Ireland. (Repealed by Statute Law Revision Act 1861 (24 & 25 Vict. c. 101))
Post Office Buildings Act 1824 (repealed)	5 Geo. 4. c. 5	5 March 1824
An Act for enabling a Conveyance to be made of Fart of a House in Lombard Street, vested in the Right Honourable Henry Frederick Lord Carteret, formerly His Majesty's Postmaster General. (Repealed by Statute Law Revision Act 1950 (14 Geo. 6. c. 6))
Indemnity Act 1824 (repealed)	5 Geo. 4. c. 6	16 March 1824
An Act to indemnify such Persons in the United Kingdom as have omitted to qualify themselves for Offices and Employments, and for extending the Time limited for those Purposes respectively, until the Twenty fifth Day of March One thousand eight hundred and twenty five; to permit such Persons in Great Britain as have omitted to make and file Affidavits of the Execution of Indentures of Clerks to Attornies and Solicitors to make and file the same on or before the First Day of Hilary Term One thousand eight hundred and twenty five; and to allow Persons to make and file such Affidavits, although the Persons whom they served shall have neglected to take out their Annual Certificates. (Repealed by Promissory Oaths Act 1871 (34 & 35 Vict. c. 48))
Revenue Inquiry Act 1824 (repealed)	5 Geo. 4. c. 7	16 March 1824
An Act to continue, until the First Day of July One thousand eight hundred and twenty seven, Two Acts of His present Majesty, (Note: Revenue (Ireland) Act 1821 (1 & 2 Geo. 4. c. 90)) (Note: Inquiry into Collection, etc., of Revenue Act 1822 (3 Geo. 4. c. 37)) for the Appointment of Commissioners for inquiring into the Collection and Management of the Public Revenue. (Repealed by Statute Law Revision Act 1873 (36 & 37 Vict. c. 91))
Church Lands Act 1824 (repealed)	5 Geo. 4. c. 8	16 March 1824
An Act to amend an Act of the last Session of Parliament, (Note: Church of Ireland Act 1823 (4 Geo. 4. c. 86)) for amending the Laws for the Improvement of Church Lands in Ireland. (Repealed by Statute Law Revision Act 1861 (24 & 25 Vict. c. 101))
National Debt Act 1824 (repealed)	5 Geo. 4. c. 9	16 March 1824
An Act to carry into Effect a Convention relating to Austrian Loans. (Repealed by Statute Law Revision Act 1870 (33 & 34 Vict. c. 69))
Postage Act 1824 (repealed)	5 Geo. 4. c. 10	16 March 1824
An Act for granting to His Majesty Rates of Postage on the Conveyance of Letters and Packets to and from Buenos Ayres, or any other Port or Ports on the Continent of South America. (Repealed by Post Office (Repeal of Laws) Act 1837 (7 Will. 4 & 1 Vict. c. 32))
National Debt (No. 2) Act 1824 (repealed)	5 Geo. 4. c. 11	23 March 1824
An Act for transferring several Annuities of Four Pounds per Centum per Annum into Annuities of Three Pounds Ten Shillings per Centum per Annum. (Repealed by Statute Law Revision Act 1870 (33 & 34 Vict. c. 69))
Gaol Sessions Act 1824 (repealed)	5 Geo. 4. c. 12	23 March 1824
An Act to facilitate, in those Counties which are divided into Ridings or Divisions, the Execution of an Act of the last Session of Parliament, (Note: Gaols Act 1823 (4 Geo. 4. c. 64)) for consolidating and amending the Laws relating to the building, repairing and regulating of certain Gaols and Houses of Correction in England and Wales. (Repealed by Statute Law Revision Act 1874 (37 & 38 Vict. c. 35), Statute Law Revision (No. 2) Act 1888 (51 & 52 Vict. c. 57) and Statute Law Revision Act 1950 (14 Geo. 6. c. 6))
Mutiny Act 1824 (repealed)	5 Geo. 4. c. 13	23 March 1824
An Act for punishing Mutiny and Desertion; and for the better Payment of the Army and their Quarters. (Repealed by Statute Law Revision Act 1873 (36 & 37 Vict. c. 91))
Marine Mutiny Act 1824 (repealed)	5 Geo. 4. c. 14	23 March 1824
An Act for the regulating of His Majesty's Royal Marine Forces while on Shore. (Repealed by Statute Law Revision Act 1873 (36 & 37 Vict. c. 91))
Duties on Sugar, etc. Act 1824 (repealed)	5 Geo. 4. c. 15	23 March 1824
An Act for continuing to His Majesty for One Year certain Duties on Sugar, Tobacco and Snuff, Foreign Spirits and Sweets, in Great Britain; and on Pensions, Offices and Personal Estates, in England; and for receiving the Contributions of Persons receiving Pensions and holding Offices; for the Service of the Year One thousand eight hundred and twenty four. (Repealed by Statute Law Revision Act 1873 (36 & 37 Vict. c. 91))
Court of Exchequer (Ireland) Act 1824 (repealed)	5 Geo. 4. c. 16	23 March 1824
An Act to amend an Act passed in the last Session of Parliament, (Note: Court of Exchequer (Ireland) Act 1823 (4 Geo. 4. c. 70))) for the better Administration of Justice in the Equity Side of the Court of Exchequer in Ireland. (Repealed by Statute Law Revision Act 1861 (24 & 25 Vict. c. 101))
Slave Trade (No. 1) Act 1824 (repealed)	5 Geo. 4. c. 17	31 March 1824
An Act for the more effectual Suppression of the African Slave Trade. (Repealed by Statute Law Revision Act 1861 (24 & 25 Vict. c. 101))
Summary Convictions, etc. Act 1824 (repealed)	5 Geo. 4. c. 18	31 March 1824
An Act for the more effectual Recovery of Penalties before Justices and Magistrates on Conviction of Offenders; and for facilitating the Execution of Warrants by Constables (Repealed by Summary Jurisdiction Act 1848 (11 & 12 Vict. c. 43) and Summary Convictions (Ireland) Act 1849 (12 & 13 Vict. c. 70))
Male Convicts Act 1824 (repealed)	5 Geo. 4. c. 19	12 April 1824
An Act to provide for the future Confinement of Male Convicts, removed from the General Penitentiary, and now on board Vessels in the River Thames. (Repealed by Statute Law Revision Act 1873 (36 & 37 Vict. c. 91))
Conveyance by Post of Bank Notes, etc. Act 1824 (repealed)	5 Geo. 4. c. 20	12 April 1824
An Act to regulate the Conveyance of Packets containing reissuable Country Bank Notes by the Post, and to charge Rates of Postage thereon; to prevent Letters and Packets being sent otherwise than by the Post; to punish Persons embezzling printed Proceedings in Parliament or Newspapers; and to allow the President of the Commissioners of Revenue Enquiry to send and receive Letters and Packets free from the Duty of Postage. (Repealed by Post Office (Repeal of Laws) Act 1837 (7 Will. 4 & 1 Vict. c. 32))
Silk Manufacturers Act 1824 (repealed)	5 Geo. 4. c. 21	12 April 1824
An Act to reduce the Duties on Importation of Raw and Thrown Silk, and to repeal the Prohibition on the Importation of Silk Manufactures, and to grant certain Duties thereon. (Repealed by Customs Law Repeal Act 1825 (6 Geo. 4. c. 105))
Repeal of Certain Duties Act 1824 (repealed)	5 Geo. 4. c. 22	12 April 1824
An Act to repeal the Duties on all Articles the Manufacture of Great Britain and Ireland respectively, on their Importation into either Country from the other. (Repealed by Statute Law Revision Act 1873 (36 & 37 Vict. c. 91))
Board of Works (Ireland) Act 1824 (repealed)	5 Geo. 4. c. 23	12 April 1824
An Act to amend an Act of the Fifty seventh Year of His late Majesty's Reign, (Note: Public Offices (Ireland) Act 1817 (57 Geo. 3. c. 62)) for abolishing certain Offices, and for regulating certain other Offices, in Ireland; so far as relates to the Commissioners of the Board of Works there. (Repealed by Statute Law Revision Act 1873 (36 & 37 Vict. c. 91))
National Debt (No. 3) Act 1824 (repealed)	5 Geo. 4. c. 24	12 April 1824
An Act for transferring several Annuities of Four Pounds per Centum per Annunum, transferable at the Bank of Ireland, into Reduced Annuities of Three Pounds Ten Shillings per Centum per Annum. (Repealed by Statute Law Revision Act 1870 (33 & 34 Vict. c. 69))
Burial (Ireland) Act 1824	5 Geo. 4. c. 25	15 April 1824
An Act to repeal so much of an Act passed in the Ninth Year of the Reign of King William the Third, (Note: Banishment Act 1697 (9 Will. 3. c. 1 (I))) as relates to Burials in suppressed Monasteries, Abbeys or Convents, in Ireland; and to make further Provision with respect to the Burial, in Ireland, of Persons dissenting from the Established Church.
Barrack Property Act 1824 (repealed)	5 Geo. 4. c. 26	15 April 1824
An Act to remove Doubts as to certain Property formerly vested in the Barrack Department. (Repealed by Statute Law Revision Act 1861 (24 & 25 Vict. c. 101))
Proctors (Ireland) Act 1824 (repealed)	5 Geo. 4. c. 27	17 May 1824
An Act to explain and amend an Act of the Parliament of Ireland, passed in the Thirty eighth Year of the Reign of His Majesty King George the Third, (Note: Proctors' Bills of Costs Act 1798 (38 Geo. 3. c. 39 (I))) for the better ascertaining the Amount, and securing the Payment of the Bills of Costs of Proctors, employed in carrying on and defending Suits, and transacting Business in the High Court of Admiralty, in His Majesty's Court of Prerogative, in the Court of Delegates, and in all Ecclesiastical Courts within the Kingdom of Ireland. (Repealed by Statute Law Revision Act 1873 (36 & 37 Vict. c. 91))
Constables (Ireland) Act 1824 (repealed)	5 Geo. 4. c. 28	17 May 1824
An Act to amend an Act of the Third Year of His present Majesty's Reign, (Note: Appointment of Constables, etc. (Ireland) Act 1822 (3 Geo. 4. c. 103)) for the Appointment of Constables in Ireland. (Repealed by Constabulary (Ireland) Act 1836 (6 & 7 Will. 4. c. 13))
County Treasurers (Ireland) Act 1824 (repealed)	5 Geo. 4. c. 29	17 May 1824
An Act to amend an Act of the last Session of Parliament, (Note: County Treasurers (Ireland) Act 1823 (4 Geo. 4. c. 33)) for making more effectual Regulations for the Election, and for securing the Performance of the Duties of County Treasurers in Ireland. (Repealed by Statute Law Revision Act 1873 (36 & 37 Vict. c. 91))
Stealing of Records, etc. Act 1824 (repealed)	5 Geo. 4. c. 30	17 May 1824
An Act to prevent the Stealing of Records, Deeds and Papers, in Ireland. (Repealed by Criminal Statutes (Ireland) Repeal Act 1828 (9 Geo. 4. c. 53))
Quartering of Soldiers Act 1824 (repealed)	5 Geo. 4. c. 31	17 May 1824
An Act for fixing, until the Twenty fifth Day of March One thousand eight hundred and twenty five, the Rates of Subsistence to be paid to Innkeepers and others on quartering Soldiers. (Repealed by Statute Law Revision Act 1873 (36 & 37 Vict. c. 91))
Marriage Act 1824 (repealed)	5 Geo. 4. c. 32	17 May 1824
An Act to amend an Act passed in the last Session of Parliament, intituled "An Act for amending the Laws respecting the Solemnization of Marriages in England." (Note: Marriage Act 1823 (4 Geo. 4. c. 76)) (Repealed by Marriage Act 1949 (12, 13 & 14 Geo. 6. c. 76))
Militia Pay Act 1824 (repealed)	5 Geo. 4. c. 33	17 May 1824
An Act to defray the Charge oi the Pay, Clothing and contingent and other Expences of the Disembodied Militia in Great Britain and Ireland; and to grant Allowances in certain Cases to Subaltern Officers, Adjutants, Quartermasters, Surgeons, Assistant Surgeons, Surgeons Mates and Serjeant Majors of Militia, until the Twenty fifth Day of March One thousand eight hundred and twenty five. (Repealed by Statute Law Revision Act 1873 (36 & 37 Vict. c. 91))
Duties on Colonial Rum Act 1824 (repealed)	5 Geo. 4. c. 34	17 May 1824
An Act to reduce the Duties on Rum, the Produce of the British Colonies or Plantations in America, imported into the United Kingdom. (Repealed by Customs Law Repeal Act 1825 (6 Geo. 4. c. 105))
Refined Sugar Bounties Act 1824 (repealed)	5 Geo. 4. c. 35	17 May 1824
An Act to continue, until the Fifth Day of July One thousand eight hundred and twenty five, the Acts for granting Bounties on the Exportation of refined Sugar from the United Kingdom, and for reducing the Size of the Packages in which refined Sugar may be exported. (Repealed by Customs Law Repeal Act 1825 (6 Geo. 4. c. 105))
Public Works Loans Act 1824 (repealed)	5 Geo. 4. c. 36	17 May 1824
An Act to amend and render more effectual the several Acts for the issuing of Exchequer Bills for Public Works. (Repealed by Public Works Loans Act 1875 (38 & 39 Vict. c. 89))
Aliens Act 1824 (repealed)	5 Geo. 4. c. 37	17 May 1824
An Act to continue for Two Years, and to amend an Act of the Fifty sixth Year of His late Majesty, (Note: Aliens Act 1816 (56 Geo. 3. c. 86)) for establishing Regulations respecting Aliens arriving in or resident in this Kingdom, in certain Cases. (Repealed by Statute Law Revision Act 1873 (36 & 37 Vict. c. 91))
Highland Roads (Scotland) Act 1824 (repealed)	5 Geo. 4. c. 38	17 May 1824
An Act to amend Two Acts (Note: Highland Roads (Scotland) Act 1819 (59 Geo. 3. c. 135)) (Note: Military Roads, etc. (Scotland) Act 1823 (4 Geo. 4. c. 56)) for maintaining and keeping in Repair the Military and Parliamentary Roads in the Highlands of Scotland. (Repealed by Statute Law Revision Act 1873 (36 & 37 Vict. c. 91), Statute Law Revision Act 1878 (41 & 42 Vict. c. 79) and Local Government (Scotland) Act 1889 (52 & 53 Vict. c. 50))
British Museum Act 1824 (repealed)	5 Geo. 4. c. 39	17 May 1824
An Act for amending former Acts relative to the British Museum. (Repealed by British Museum Act 1963 (c. 24))
Duties on Glass, etc. Act 1824 (repealed)	5 Geo. 4. c. 40	17 May 1824
An Act to continue, until the Tenth Day of October One thousand eight hundred and twenty seven, an Act (Note: Excise (No. 4) Act 1819 (59 Geo. 3. c. 104)) relating to Duties of Excise on Crown, Flint and Phial Glass, and to alter certain Laws of Excise relating to Flint Glass; and also an Act (Note: Duty on Sweets, etc. Act 1817 (57 Geo. 3. c. 111)) for suspending Part of the Duties on Sweets or Made Wines. (Repealed by Statute Law Revision Act 1873 (36 & 37 Vict. c. 91))
Stamps Act 1824 (repealed)	5 Geo. 4. c. 41	28 May 1824
An Act to repeal certain Duties on Law Proceedings in the Courts in Great Britain and Ireland respectively; and for better protecting the Duties payable upon Stamped Vellum, Parchment or Paper. (Repealed by Inland Revenue Repeal Act 1870 (33 & 34 Vict. c. 99))
Supply (No. 2) Act 1824 (repealed)	5 Geo. 4. c. 42	28 May 1824
An Act for applying the Surplus of the Grants of One thousand eight hundred and twenty three, and the Surplus of the Consolidated Fund, to the Service of the Year One thousand eight hundred and twenty four. (Repealed by Statute Law Revision Act 1873 (36 & 37 Vict. c. 91))
Coal Duties, etc. Act 1824 (repealed)	5 Geo. 4. c. 43	3 June 1824
An Act to alter the Duties on the Importation of certain Articles, and also the Duties on Coals brought to London; to repeal the Bounties on Linens exported; and to amend the Acts relating to the Customs. (Repealed by Customs Law Repeal Act 1825 (6 Geo. 4. c. 105))
Exemption from House Tax Act 1824 (repealed)	5 Geo. 4. c. 44	3 June 1824
An Act for allowing Persons to compound for their Assessed Taxes for the Remainder of the Periods of Composition limited by former Acts, and for granting Relief in certain Cases. (Repealed by Statute Law Revision (No. 2) Act 1888 (51 & 52 Vict. c. 57))
National Debt (No. 4) Act 1824 (repealed)	5 Geo. 4. c. 45	3 June 1824
An Act to authorize the issuing of Exchequer Bills for the payment of the Proprietors of Four Pounds per Centum Annuities in England and Ireland, who have not signified their Assents under the Acts passed in this Session, (Note: National Debt (No. 2) Act 1824 (5 Geo. 4. c. 11)) (Note: National Debt (No. 3) Act 1824 (5 Geo. 4. c. 24)) for transferring such Annuities into Reduced Annuities of Three Pounds Ten Shillings per Centum. (Repealed by Statute Law Revision Act 1870 (33 & 34 Vict. c. 69))
Duties on Coals Act 1824 (repealed)	5 Geo. 4. c. 46	3 June 1824
An Act to continue, until the Fifth Day of July One thousand eight hundred and twenty six, the Low Duties on Coals and Culm carried Coastwise to any Port within the Principality of Wales. (Repealed by Customs Law Repeal Act 1825 (6 Geo. 4. c. 105))
Wool Duties, etc. Act 1824 (repealed)	5 Geo. 4. c. 47	3 June 1824
An Act to alter the Laws relating to the Duties on the Importation, and the Prohibitions on the Exportation of Wool, and of Hare and Coney Skins. (Repealed by Customs Law Repeal Act 1825 (6 Geo. 4. c. 105))
Crown Lands Act 1824 (repealed)	5 Geo. 4. c. 48	3 June 1824
An Act to enable the Commissioners of His Majesty's Treasury to sell out certain Bank Annuities now standing in their Names, and to imply the Produce thereof in part Payment of a Loan of Three hundred thousand Pounds, due to the Royal Exchange Assurance Company; and to facilitate the Sales of Fee Farm Rents, and of small Portions of the Land Revenue of the Crown; and for other Purposes. (Repealed by Statute Law Revision Act 1873 (36 & 37 Vict. c. 91))
Victualling Establishment, Plymouth Act 1824	5 Geo. 4. c. 49	3 June 1824
An Act for enabling the Commissioners for Victualling His Majesty's Navy to purchase certain Premises, for competing a Victualling Establishment at Cremill Point near Plymouth in the County of Devon, and for supplying the said Establishment with Water.
Price of Bread Act 1824 (repealed)	5 Geo. 4. c. 50	3 June 1824
An Act for amending an Act passed in the Fifty third Year of the Reign of His late Majesty King George the Third, (Note: Price, etc., of Bread Act 1813 (53 Geo. 3. c. 116)) intituled "An Act to alter and amend Two Acts of the Thirty first Year of the Reign of King George the Second (Note: Making of Bread Act 1757 (31 Geo. 2. c. 29)) and the Thirteenth Year of His present Majesty, (Note: Bread Act 1772 (13 Geo. 3. c. 62)) so far as relates to the Price and Assize of Bread to be sold out of the City of London and the Liberties thereof and beyond the Weekly Bills of Mortality, and Ten Miles of the Royal Exchange." (Repealed by Statute Law Revision Act 1861 (24 & 25 Vict. c. 101))
Newfoundland Fisheries Act 1824 (repealed)	5 Geo. 4. c. 51	3 June 1824
An Act to repeal several Laws relating to the Fisheries carried on upon the Banks and Shores of Newfoundland, and to make Provision for the better Conduct of the said Fisheries for Five Years, and from thence to the End of the then next Session of Parliament. (Repealed by Statute Law Revision Act 1873 (36 & 37 Vict. c. 91))
Kingston-upon-Hull Dock Act 1824	5 Geo. 4. c. 52	3 June 1824
An Act to amend so much of an Act of the Forty second Year of His late Majesty, (Note: Kingston-upon-Hull Dock Act 1802 (42 Geo. 3. c. xci)) for making additional Basons or Docks at Kingston upon Hull, as relates to certain Lands belonging to His Majesty.
National Debt (No. 5) Act 1824 (repealed)	5 Geo. 4. c. 53	3 June 1824
An Act to permit the mutual Transfer of Capital in certain Public Stocks or Funds transferable at the Banks of England and Ireland respectively. (Repealed by Statute Law Revision Act 1870 (33 & 34 Vict. c. 69))
Licenses to Brew and Sell Beer, etc. Act 1824 (repealed)	5 Geo. 4. c. 54	4 June 1824
An Act to repeal the Duties on Licences to brew and to retail Beer, Spirituous Liquors and Foreign Wine, and to grant other Duties in lieu thereof; and amend the Laws of Excise relating to such Duties, and to Brewers and Retailers of Beer. (Repealed by Statute Law Revision Act 1873 (36 & 37 Vict. c. 91))
Duties on Hides, etc. Act 1824 (repealed)	5 Geo. 4. c. 55	9 June 1824
An Act to assimilate the Duties and Drawbacks on Hides, Skins, Leather, Parchment, Paper and Paper Hangings, manufactured in Ireland, to the Duties and Drawbacks payable on the like Articles in Great Britain; and to equalize the Measures and Weights whereby the Duties of Excise and Customs shall be payable throughout the United Kingdom. (Repealed by Statute Law Revision Act 1873 (36 & 37 Vict. c. 91))
Distilleries (Scotland) Act 1824 (repealed)	5 Geo. 4. c. 56	9 June 1824
An Act to continue, until the Tenth Day of November One thousand eight hundred and twenty six, certain Parts of an Act of the Third Year of His present Majesty, (Note: Illicit Distillation (Scotland) Act 1822 (3 Geo. 4. c. 52)) among other Things for the preventing private Distillation in Scotland. (Repealed by Statute Law Revision Act 1873 (36 & 37 Vict. c. 91))
Horse Hides Act 1824 or the London Skin Trade Repealing Act 1824 (repealed)	5 Geo. 4. c. 57	9 June 1824
An Act to repeal Four Acts of His late Majesty, (Note: Use of Horse Hides, etc. Act 1800 (39 & 40 Geo. 3. c. 66)) (Note: Damaging of Hides Act 1801 (41 Geo. 3. (U.K.) c. 53)) (Note: London Skin Trade Act 1803 (43 Geo. 3. c. cvi)) (Note: London Hides and Skins Trade Act 1808 (48 Geo. 3. c. lxxi)) relating to the Use of Horse Hides in making Boots and Shoes, and for better preventing the damaging of Raw Hides and Skins in the flaying thereof. (Repealed by Statute Law Revision Act 1873 (36 & 37 Vict. c. 91))
Charity Commission Act 1824 (repealed)	5 Geo. 4. c. 58	9 June 1824
An Act to continue for Four Years, and from thence until the End of the then next Session of Parliament, the Powers of the Commissioners for enquiring concerning Charities in England and Wales. (Repealed by Statute Law Revision Act 1873 (36 & 37 Vict. c. 91))
Mar Peerage Restoration Act 1824 (repealed)	5 Geo. 4. c. 59	9 June 1824
An act for exhibiting a Bill for the Restoration of John Francis Erskine of Mar. (Repealed by Statute Law Revision Act 1873 (36 & 37 Vict. c. 91))
British Museum (No. 2) Act 1824 (repealed)	5 Geo. 4. c. 60	17 June 1824
An Act to carry into Effect the Will of Richard Payne Knight Esquire, so far as the same relates to a Bequest by the said Richard Payne Knight of a Collection of Coins, Medals and other valuable Articles, to the British Museum; and to vest the said Collection in the Trustees of the said British Museum, for the Use of the Public. (Repealed by British Museum Act 1963 (c. 24))
Insolvent Debtors (England) Act 1824 (repealed)	5 Geo. 4. c. 61	17 June 1824
An Act to amend certain Acts for the Relief of Insolvent Debtors in England. (Repealed by Insolvent Debtors (England) Act 1826 (7 Geo. 4. c. 57))
Savings Banks Act 1824 (repealed)	5 Geo. 4. c. 62	17 June 1824
An Act to amend the several Acts for the Encouragement of Banks for Savings, in England and Ireland. (Repealed by Savings Bank Act 1828 (9 Geo. 4. c. 92))
Composition for Tithes (Ireland) Act 1824 (repealed)	5 Geo. 4. c. 63	17 June 1824
An Act to amend an Act of the last Session of Parliament, (Note: Composition for Tithes (Ireland) Act 1823 (4 Geo. 4. c. 99)) for providing for the establishing of Compositions for Tithes in Ireland. (Repealed by Statute Law Revision Act 1873 (36 & 37 Vict. c. 91))
Fisheries Act 1824 (repealed)	5 Geo. 4. c. 64	17 June 1824
An Act to amend the several Acts for the Encouragement and Improvement of the British and Irish Fisheries. (Repealed for Ireland by Fisheries (Ireland) Act 1842 (5 & 6 Vict. c. 106) and for England and Wales and Scotland by Fisheries Act 1955 (3 & 4 Eliz. 2. c. 7))
Repeal of Salt Duties Act 1824 (repealed)	5 Geo. 4. c. 65	17 June 1824
An Act to repeal the Duties and Laws in respect of Salt and Rock Salt. (Repealed by Statute Law Revision Act 1873 (36 & 37 Vict. c. 91))
Silk Manufactures Act 1824 (repealed)	5 Geo. 4. c. 66	17 June 1824
An Act to repeal certain Acts of His late Majesty, relating to the Wages of Persons employed in the Manufacture of Silk, and of Silk mixed with other Materials. (Repealed by Statute Law Revision Act 1873 (36 & 37 Vict. c. 91))
Newfoundland Act 1824	5 Geo. 4. c. 67	17 June 1824
An Act for the better Administration of Justice in Newfoundland, and for other Purposes.
Marriages Confirmation (Newfoundland) Act 1824	5 Geo. 4. c. 68	17 June 1824
An Act to repeal an Act passed in the Fifty seventh Year of the Reign of His late Majesty King George the Third, intituled "An Act to regulate the Celebration of Marriages in Newfoundland;" (Note: Marriages, Newfoundland Act 1817 (57 Geo. 3. c. 51)) and to make further Provision for the Celebration of Marriages in the said Colony and its Dependencies.
Turnpike Roads Act 1824 (repealed)	5 Geo. 4. c. 69	17 June 1824
An Act to enable Justices of the Peace for Ridings, Divisions or Sokes, to act as Trustees for repairing and maintaining Turnpike Roads. (Repealed by Statute Law (Repeals) Act 1981 (c. 19))
Customs Act 1824 (repealed)	5 Geo. 4. c. 70	17 June 1824
An Act to permit Flour to be substituted for Foreign Wheat secured in Warehouses. (Repealed by Statute Law Revision Act 1861 (24 & 25 Vict. c. 101))
Maintenance of Lunatics Act 1824 (repealed)	5 Geo. 4. c. 71	17 June 1824
An Act to amend several Acts passed for the better Care and Maintenance of Lunatics, being Paupers or Criminals, in England. (Repealed by County Lunatic Asylums (England) Act 1828 (9 Geo. 4. c. 40))
Teinds Act 1824 (repealed)	5 Geo. 4. c. 72	17 June 1824
An Act for amending and rendering more effectual an Act (Note: Teinds Act 1810 (50 Geo. 3. c. 84)) for augmenting Parochial Stipends, in certain Cases, in Scotland. (Repealed by Church of Scotland (Property and Endowments) Act 1925 (15 & 16 Geo. 5. c. 33))
Relief of Bankers (Ireland) Act 1824 (repealed)	5 Geo. 4. c. 73	17 June 1824
An Act to relieve Bankers in Ireland from divers Restraints imposed by the Provisions of the Twenty ninth of George the Second, (Note: Public Credit Act 1755 (29 Geo. 2. c. 16 (I))) and to render all and each of the Members of certain Copartnerships of Bankers which may be established liable to the Engagements of such Copartnerships, and to enable such Copartnenhips to sue and be sued in the Name of their Public Officer. (Repealed by Bankers (Ireland) Act 1825 (6 Geo. 4. c. 42))
Weights and Measures Act 1824	5 Geo. 4. c. 74	17 June 1824
An Act for ascertaining and establishing Uniformity of Weights and Measures.
Excise and Customs Act 1824 (repealed)	5 Geo. 4. c. 75	17 June 1824
An Act to decrease the Duty on Cocoa Nuts imported; to exempt certain Goods from Payment of Auction Duties; to provide that the Parish of Saint Pancras shall be under the Inspection of the Head Office of Excise; and to amend certain Laws of Excise relating to Maltsters in Ireland; to the Drawback on Beer exported from Great Britain; and to the Duty on Draining Tiles. (Repealed by Statute Law Revision Act 1861 (24 & 25 Vict. c. 101))
Duties on East India Goods, etc. Act 1824 (repealed)	5 Geo. 4. c. 76	17 June 1824
An Act to continue several Acts for establishing Regulations for the Security of the Revenue on Goods imported from Places within the Limits of the Charter granted to the East India Company; and to grant, until the Twenty fifth Day of March One thousand eight hundred and twenty five, Duties on Sugar imported from Places within the Limits of the said Charter, in lieu of former Duties. (Repealed by Customs Law Repeal Act 1825 (6 Geo. 4. c. 105))
Public Works Loans (No. 2) Act 1824 (repealed)	5 Geo. 4. c. 77	17 June 1824
An Act to amend the Acts for the Issue of Exchequer Bills for Public Works. (Repealed by Public Works Loans Act 1875 (38 & 39 Vict. c. 89))
Duchy of Cornwall Act 1824 (repealed)	5 Geo. 4. c. 78	17 June 1824
An Act to amend an Act of the Third Year of His present Majesty, (Note: Leases of Lands of Duchy of Cornwall Act 1822 (3 Geo. 4. c. 78)) for enabling His Majesty to lease Lands belonging to the Duchy of Cornwall, and to authorize the Sale and Purchase of the Prisage and Butlerage of Wines in the Ports of the County of Cornwall, and in Plymouth. (Repealed by Finance Act 1963 (c. 25))
Oath, Revenue Officers Act 1824 (repealed)	5 Geo. 4. c. 79	17 June 1824
An Act to enable certain Persons to receive and hold Offices in the Management, Collection and Receipt of the Revenue, without taking or subscribing certain Oaths and Declarations. (Repealed by Promissory Oaths Act 1871 (34 & 35 Vict. c. 48))
Connor Tithes Act 1824	5 Geo. 4. c. 80	17 June 1824
An Act for disappropriating, disuniting and divesting from and out of the Chancellors, Archdeacons and Precentors of the Diocese of Connor in the County of Antrim, in Ireland, (after the Decease or Removal of the present Incumbents) certain Rectories and the Rectorial Tithes thereof, Parts of the Corps of the said respective Dignities; and for annexing and uniting the said respective Rectories when so disappropriated, and the Rectorial Tithes thereof, to the respective Vicarages of the said several Rectories, whereby the Incumbent of each Parish and Rectory shall have the actual Cure of Souls, and for other Purposes.
Bray and Kilternan Parishes Act 1824	5 Geo. 4. c. 81	17 June 1824
An Act for separating the Parish or Vicarage of Bray from the Parish of Kilternan, and for uniting the said Parish of Kilternan with the Parish of Kilgobban, situate in the Barony of Rathdaum and County of Dublin, in Ireland.
Clerk of the Parliaments Act 1824 or the Clerk of Parliaments Act 1824	5 Geo. 4. c. 82	21 June 1824
An Act for better regulating the Office of Clerk of the Parliaments.
Vagrancy Act 1824	5 Geo. 4. c. 83	21 June 1824
An Act for the Punishment of idle and disorderly Persons, and Rogues and Vagabonds, in that Part of Great Britain called England.
Transportation Act 1824 (repealed)	5 Geo. 4. c. 84	21 June 1824
An act for the Transportation of Offenders from Great Britain. (Repealed for England and Wales by Criminal Justice Act 1948 (11 & 12 Geo. 6. c. 58) and for Scotland by Criminal Justice (Scotland) Act 1949 (12, 13 & 14 Geo. 6. c. 94))
Gaols, etc. (England) Act 1824 (repealed)	5 Geo. 4. c. 85	21 June 1824
An Act for amending an Act of the last Session of Parliament, relating to the building, repairing and enlarging of certain Gaols and Houses of Correction; and for procuring Information as to the State of all other Gaols and Houses of Correction in England and Wales. (Repealed by Prison Act 1865 (28 & 29 Vict. c. 126))
Australian Agricultural Company Act 1824 (repealed)	5 Geo. 4. c. 86	21 June 1824
An Act for granting certain Powers and Authorities to a Company to be incorporated by Charter, to be called "The Australian Agricultural Company," for the Cultivation and Improvement of Waste Lands in the Colony of New South Wales, and for other Purposes relating thereto. (Repealed by Australian Agricultural Company Act 1912 (2 & 3 Geo. 5. c. xlviii))
Entail Provisions Act 1824 (repealed)	5 Geo. 4. c. 87	21 June 1824
An Act to authorize the proprietors of entailed estates in Scotland to grant provisions to the wives or husbands and children of such proprietors. (Repealed by Abolition of Feudal Tenure etc. (Scotland) Act 2000 (asp 5))
East India Company Act 1824 (repealed)	5 Geo. 4. c. 88	21 June 1824
An Act to authorize the East India Company to trade direct from China to the British Colonies and Plantations in America. (Repealed by Customs Law Repeal Act 1825 (6 Geo. 4. c. 105))
Relief of Certain Incumbents Act 1824 (repealed)	5 Geo. 4. c. 89	21 June 1824
An Act for the Relief, in certain Cases, of the Incumbents of Ecclesiastical Livings or Benefices mortgaged for building, rebuilding, repairing or purchasing Houses and other necessary Buildings and Tenements for such Benefices. (Repealed by Statute Law Revision Act 1873 (36 & 37 Vict. c. 91))
Church of Scotland Act 1824 or the Church Building (Scotland) Act 1824 (repealed)	5 Geo. 4. c. 90	21 June 1824
An Act to amend an Act (Note: Additional Places of Worship in the Highlands Act 1823 (4 Geo. 4. c. 79)) for building additional Places of Worship in the Highlands and Islands of Scotland. (Repealed by Statute Law (Repeals) Act 1973 (c. 39))
Church of Ireland Act 1824	5 Geo. 4. c. 91	21 June 1824
An Act to consolidate and amend the Laws for enforcing the Residence of Spiritual Persons on their Benefices; to restrain Spiritual Persons from carrying on Trade or Merchandize; and for the Support and Maintenance of Stipendiary Curates, in Ireland.
Duties in Docks, etc. (Ireland) Act 1824 (repealed)	5 Geo. 4. c. 92	21 June 1824
An Act to authorize the Payment of certain Duties on Ships and Merchandize, in respect of the Docks and Warehouses in the Port of Dublin, and other Ports in Ireland; and for other Purposes relating to such Docks and Warehouses. (Repealed by Statute Law Revision Act 1874 (37 & 38 Vict. c. 35))
Salaries of County Officers (Ireland) Act 1824 (repealed)	5 Geo. 4. c. 93	21 June 1824
An Act to amend the Acts of the last Session of Parliament (Note: Salaries of County Officers (Ireland) Act 1823 (4 Geo. 4. c. 43)) relating to Presentments by Grand Juries for Payment of the Salaries of public Officers of the several Counties in Ireland. (Repealed by Statute Law Revision Act 1873 (36 & 37 Vict. c. 91))
Prosecution by Customs or Excise Act 1824 (repealed)	5 Geo. 4. c. 94	21 June 1824
An Act to allow the Averment of the Order for Prosecution by Commissioners of Customs or Excise to be sufficient Proof of the Order having been made. (Repealed by Statute Law Revision Act 1873 (36 & 37 Vict. c. 91))
Combination of Workmen Act 1824 (repealed)	5 Geo. 4. c. 95	21 June 1824
An Act to repeal the Laws relative to the Combination of Workmen; and for other Purposes therein mentioned. (Repealed by Combinations of Workmen Act 1825 (6 Geo. 4. c. 129))
Masters and Workmen Arbitration Act 1824 (repealed)	5 Geo. 4. c. 96	21 June 1824
An Act to consolidate and amend the Laws relative to the Arbitration of Disputes between Masters and Workmen. (Repealed by Conciliation Act 1896 (59 & 60 Vict. c. 30))
Artificers Going Abroad Act 1824 (repealed)	5 Geo. 4. c. 97	21 June 1824
An Act to repeal the Laws relative to Artificers going into Foreign Parts. (Repealed by Statute Law Revision Act 1873 (36 & 37 Vict. c. 91))
Bankruptcy (England) Act 1824 (repealed)	5 Geo. 4. c. 98	21 June 1824
An Act to consolidate and amend the Bankrupt Laws. (Repealed by Bankruptcy Act 1825 (6 Geo. 4. c. 16))
Whittlewood Forest Act 1824 (repealed)	5 Geo. 4. c. 99	21 June 1824
An Act for dividing, allotting and inclosing that portion of the forest of Whittlewood called Hasleborough Walk in the parish of Whitfield and liberties or precincts of Silston otherwise Silverston otherwise Silveston Burnham in the county of Northampton, and of the open fields of Silston otherwise Silverston otherwise Silveston Burnham aforesaid. (Repealed by Wild Creatures and Forest Laws Act 1971 (c. 47))
Regent's Park, Regent Street, etc. Act 1824	5 Geo. 4. c. 100	21 June 1824
An Act for more effectually paving, lighting, watching, cleansing and regulating the Regent's Park, together with the New Street from the Regent's Park to Pall Mall, and the New Streets and Improvements in the Neighbourhood of Parliament Street and Privy Gardens; and for maintaining a convenient Sewage for the same.
St. David's College Act 1824	5 Geo. 4. c. 101	21 June 1824
An Act to enable His Majesty to grant certain Advowsons, Rectories and Vicarages, in the several Counties of Carmarthen, Cardigan and Pembroke, in the Principality of Wales, to a College to be incorporated by Charter, to be called Saint David's College.
Dublin Justices Act 1824 (repealed)	5 Geo. 4. c. 102	21 June 1824
An Act to amend an Act of the Forty-eighth Year of the Reign of His late Majesty, for the more effectual Administration of the Office of a Justice of the Peace, and for the more effectual Prevention of Felonies within the District of Dublin Metropolis. (Repealed by Statute Law (Repeals) Act 2013 (c. 2))
Church Building Act 1824 (repealed)	5 Geo. 4. c. 103	24 June 1824
An Act to make further provision, and to amend and render more effectual Three Acts passed in the Fifty-eighth (Note: Church Building Act 1818 (58 Geo. 3. c. 45)) and Fifty-ninth (Note: Church Building Act 1819 (59 Geo. 3. c. 134)) Years of His late Majesty, and in the Third Year of His present Majesty, (Note: Church Building Act 1822 (3 Geo. 4. c. 72)) for building and promoting the building of additional Churches in populous Parishes. (Repealed by Statute Law (Repeals) Act 1974 (c. 22))
Superannuation Allowances Act 1824 (repealed)	5 Geo. 4. c. 104	24 June 1824
An Act to amend an Act of the Third Year of His present Majesty, (Note: Public Salaries, etc. Act 1822 (3 Geo. 4. c. 113)) respecting Superannuation Allowances. (Repealed by Superannuation Act 1834 (4 & 5 Will. 4. c. 24))
Insurrections, etc. (Ireland) Act 1824 (repealed)	5 Geo. 4. c. 105	24 June 1824
An Act further to continue and to amend an Act, made in the Third Year of His present Majesty's Reign, (Note: Suppression of Insurrections (Ireland) (No. 2) Act 1822 (3 Geo. 4. c. 80)) for suppressing Insurrections and preventing Disturbances of the public Peace in Ireland. (Repealed by Statute Law Revision Act 1873 (36 & 37 Vict. c. 91))
Court of Great Sessions (Wales) Act 1824 (repealed)	5 Geo. 4. c. 106	24 June 1824
An Act to enlarge and extend the Power of the Judges of the several Courts of Great Sessions in Wales, and to amend the Laws relating to the same. (Repealed by Statute Law Revision Act 1861 (24 & 25 Vict. c. 101))
Chelsea Hospital Act 1824 (repealed)	5 Geo. 4. c. 107	24 June 1824
An Act to prevent the illegal pawning of Clothes and Stores belonging to Chelsea Hospital; to give further Powers to the Treasurer and Deputy Treasurer of Chelsea and Greenwich Hospitals; to punish Persons fraudulently receiving Prize Money or Pensions; and to enable the Commissioners of Chelsea Hospital to hold Lands purchased under the Will of Colonel Drowly. (Repealed by Chelsea and Kilmainham Hospitals Act 1826 (7 Geo. 4. c. 16) and Army Prize Money Act 1832 (2 & 3 Will. 4. c. 53))
Transfer of Singapore to East India Company, etc. Act 1824 (repealed)	5 Geo. 4. c. 108	24 June 1824
An act for transferring to the East India Company certain Possessions newly acquired in the East Indies, and for authorizing the Removal of Convicts from Sumatra. (Repealed by Statute Law Revision Act 1873 (36 & 37 Vict. c. 91))
Oaths, Earl Marshal, etc. Act 1824 (repealed)	5 Geo. 4. c. 109	24 June 1824
An Act to enable the Earl Marshal and his Deputy to execute the Duties of their Office or Offices, without previously taking or subscribing certain Oaths or Declarations. (Repealed by Promissory Oaths Act 1871 (34 & 35 Vict. c. 48))
Unlawful Weights (Ireland) Act 1824 (repealed)	5 Geo. 4. c. 110	24 June 1824
An Act for the Indemnity of Magistrates in Proceedings against Persons using unlawful Weights in Ireland. (Repealed by Statute Law Revision Act 1873 (36 & 37 Vict. c. 91))
Crown Debts Act 1824 (repealed)	5 Geo. 4. c. 111	24 June 1824
An Act to amend an Act of the Forty first Year of the Reign of His late Majesty King George the Third, (Note: Crown Debts Act 1801 (41 Geo. 3. (U.K.) c. 90)) for the more speedy and effectual Recovery of Debts due to His Majesty, His Heirs and Successors, in Right of the Crown of the United Kingdom of Great Britain and Ireland; and for the better Administration of Justice within the same. (Repealed for Northern Ireland by Judicature (Northern Ireland) Act 1978 (c. 23) and for England and Wales and Scotland by Civil Jurisdiction and Judgments Act 1982 (c. 27))
Boundaries, etc., of Counties (Ireland) Act 1824 (repealed)	5 Geo. 4. c. 112	24 June 1824
An Act to amend so much of an Act of the Forty ninth Year of His late Majesty (Note: Highways (Ireland) Act 1809 (49 Geo. 3. c. 84)) as relates to the forming Tables of Manors, Parishes, Town Lands and other Subdenominations of Land, in Ireland, for the Purpose of providing for the future Survey and Valuation of that Part of the United Kingdom; and for settling the Boundaries of Counties, Cities and Towns, in certain Cases. (Repealed by Manors, etc. (Ireland) Act 1825 (6 Geo. 4. c. 99))
Slave Trade Act 1824	5 Geo. 4. c. 113	24 June 1824
An Act to amend and consolidate the Laws relating to the Abolition of the Slave Trade.
Marine Assurance Act 1824 (repealed)	5 Geo. 4. c. 114	24 June 1824
An Act to repeal so much of an Act of the Sixth Year of King George the First, (Note: Royal Exchange and London Assurance Corporation Act 1719 (6 Geo. 1. c. 18)) as restrains any other Corporations than those in the Act named, and any Societies or Partnerships, from effecting Marine Assurances, and lending Money on Bottomry. (Repealed by Statute Law Revision Act 1873 (36 & 37 Vict. c. 91))
Appropriation Act 1824 (repealed)	5 Geo. 4. c. 115	25 June 1824
An act for raising the Sum of Fifteen Millions by Exchequer Bills, for the Service of the Year One thousand eight hundred and twenty four; and for further appropriating the Supplies granted in this Session of Parliament. (Repealed by Statute Law Revision Act 1873 (36 & 37 Vict. c. 91))

=== Local acts ===
Short title	Citation	Royal assent
Long title
Tunstead and Happing Hundreds (Norfolk) Poor Relief Act 1824 (repealed)	5 Geo. 4. c. i	16 March 1824
An Act for altering and enlarging the Powers of an Act of His late Majesty King George the Third, (Note: Tunstead and Happing, Norfolk (Poor Relief) Act 1785 (25 Geo. 3. c. 27)) for the better Relief and Employment of the Poor within the Hundreds of Tunstead and Happing in the County of Norfolk. (Repealed by Poor Law Board's Provisional Orders Confirmation Act 1869 (32 & 33 Vict. c. cxxiii))
Kidwelly District of Roads Act 1824 (repealed)	5 Geo. 4. c. ii	16 March 1824
An Act for repairing, improving, widening and keeping in Repair the several Roads within the District called The Kidwelly District of Roads, in the County of Carmarthen. (Repealed by Roads within the Kidwelly District Act 1831 (1 & 2 Will. 4. c. lxv))
Road from Marsden to Gisburne (Lancashire, Yorkshire, West Riding) Act 1824 (repealed)	5 Geo. 4. c. iii	16 March 1824
An Act for more effectually repairing the Road leading from the Lord Nelson Public House, upon the Road between Burnley and Colne, in the Township of Marsden in the Parish of Whalley, in the County Palatine of Lancaster, to Gisburne in the West Riding of the County of York, and from thence to the Road leading from Skipton to Settle, at or near Long Preston, in the said West Riding of the County of York. (Repealed by Marsden, Gisburne and Long Preston Turnpike Road Act 1852 (15 & 16 Vict. c. xc))
Penrith and Cockermouth Road Act 1824 (repealed)	5 Geo. 4. c. iv	16 March 1824
An Act for more effectually amending, improving and keeping in Repair the Road leading from Penrith to Cockermouth, and several other Roads therein mentioned, all in the County of Cumberland. (Repealed by Penrith and Cockermouth Roads Act 1856 (19 & 20 Vict. c. lxiv))
Asylum for Female Orphans Act 1824 (repealed)	5 Geo. 4. c. v	23 March 1824
An Act to amend and render more effectual an Act of His late Majesty (Note: Female Orphan Asylum Act 1800 (39 & 40 Geo. 3. c. lx)) relative to the Asylum for Female Orphans. (Repealed by Statute Law (Repeals) Act 2013 (c. 2))
Thirsk and Yarm Road Act 1824 (repealed)	5 Geo. 4. c. vi	23 March 1824
An Act for more effectually repairing, improving and maintaining the Road leading from Thirsk to Yarm in the County of York. (Repealed by Thirsk and Yarm Turnpike Road Act 1854 (17 & 18 Vict. c. clii))
Carlisle and Cockermouth Roads Act 1824	5 Geo. 4. c. vii	23 March 1824
An Act for more effectually amending, improving and keeping in Repair the Roads from the City of Carlisle to the Market Town of Cockermouth in the County of Cumberland.
Wetherby and Knaresborough Road Act 1824	5 Geo. 4. c. viii	23 March 1824
An Act for amending improving and keeping in Repair the Roads leading from Wetherby to Knaresborough in the West Riding of the County of York.
Burford Lane and Stow-on-the-Wold Roads Act 1824 (repealed)	5 Geo. 4. c. ix	23 March 1824
An Act for amending and maintaining the Roads from the Hand and Post at the Top of Burford Lane in the County of Gloucester, to Stow-on-the-Wold, and from thence to Paddle Brook; and from the Cross Hands on Salford Hill in the County of Oxford, to the Hand and Post in the Parish of Withington in the County of Gloucester. (Repealed by Statute Law (Repeals) Act 2013 (c. 2))
Roads from Hurdlow House to Manchester Act 1824 (repealed)	5 Geo. 4. c. x	23 March 1824
An Act for more effectually repairing and improving the Roads from Hurdlow House in the County of Derby to Manchester in the County Palatine of Lancaster, and other Roads in the said Counties, and in the County Palatine of Chester. (Repealed by Roads from Hurdlow House to Manchester Act 1829 (10 Geo. 4. c. cxiv))
Roads from Newent Act 1824 (repealed)	5 Geo. 4. c. xi	23 March 1824
An Act for amending and maintaining the Roads leading from the Town of Newent in the County of Gloucester, and other Roads in the Counties of Gloucester and Hereford. (Repealed by Statute Law (Repeals) Act 2013 (c. 2))
Road from the end of the Exeter Turnpike Road, and Totnes Bridge Act 1824 (repealed)	5 Geo. 4. c. xii	23 March 1824
An Act for more effectually repairing and improving the Road leading from the End of the Exeter Turnpike Road to Biddaford, and also several other Roads leading from Bridgetown Pomeroy and Totnes; and for making and repairing several other Roads communicating therewith, all in the County of Devon; and for taking down and rebuilding Totnes Bridge in the same County. (Repealed by Totnes and Bridgetown Roads and Bridges Act 1835 (5 & 6 Will. 4. c. xxvi))
Hull Poor Relief Act 1824 (repealed)	5 Geo. 4. c. xiii	31 March 1824
An Act for the better Maintenance, Employment and Regulation of the Poor of the Town of Kingston upon Hull, and for repairing or rebuilding the Workhouse there. (Repealed by Statute Law (Repeals) Act 2013 (c. 2))
Keswick and Plumbgarth's Cross and Windermere Roads Act 1824	5 Geo. 4. c. xiv	31 March 1824
An Act for more effectually repairing and improving so much of the Road from Keswick in the County of Cumberland, by Dunmail Raise and Ambleside, to Kirkby in Kendal in the County of Westmorland, as is situate in the said County of Westmorland; and also the Road from Plumbgarth's Cross, near Kirkby in Kendal aforesaid, to the Lake called Windermere, in the County of Westmorland.
Appleby and Kendal and other roads in Westmorland Act 1824 (repealed)	5 Geo. 4. c. xv	31 March 1824
An Act for more effectually improving and keeping in Repair the Road from Appleby in the County of Westmoreland, to Kirkby in Kendal; and from Orton to the Turnpike Road near Shop; and from Highgate near Tebay, through Kirkby Stephen, to Market Brough in the said County. (Repealed by Appleby and Kendal Turnpike Road Act 1851 (14 & 15 Vict. c. xiii))
Pulborough, Shipley and Horsham Road Act 1824	5 Geo. 4. c. xvi	31 March 1824
An Act for making and maintaining a Turnpike Road from Marehill in the Parish of Pulborough, through Shipley, to the Direction Post on the Turnpike Road leading from Horsham to Stevning, at Southwater in the Parish of Horsham, with several Branches therefrom, all in the County of Sussex.
Arundel and Fittleworth Common Road Act 1824 (repealed)	5 Geo. 4. c. xvii	31 March 1824
An Act for more effectually repairing and amending the Road leading from the High Street in the Town of Arundel to the Turnpike Road leading from Petworth to Stopham, on Fittleworth Common, in the County of Sussex. (Repealed by Bury (Sussex) Turnpike Road Act 1852 (15 & 16 Vict. c. xxxix))
Stow Poor Relief Act 1824 (repealed)	5 Geo. 4. c. xviii	12 April 1824
An Act for altering and enlarging the Powers of Two Acts of His late Majesty (Note: Stow, Suffolk (Poor Relief) Act 1778 (18 Geo. 3. c. 35)) (Note: Stow, Suffolk (Poor Relief) Act 1781 (21 Geo. 3. c. 13)) for the better Relief and Employment of the Poor within the Hundred of Stow in the County of Suffolk. (Repealed by Statute Law (Repeals) Act 2013 (c. 2))
Lancaster (Judges' Lodgings) Act 1824 (repealed)	5 Geo. 4. c. xix	12 April 1824
An Act for providing a convenient House, with suitable Accommodations, for His Majesty's Judges at the Assizes for the County Palatine of Lancaster, and for maintaining and supporting the same. (Repealed by County of Lancashire Act 1984 (c. xxi))
Worthing Chapel of Ease Act 1824	5 Geo. 4. c. xx	12 April 1824
An Act to revive and amend an Act of the Forty ninth Year of His late Majesty, (Note: Worthing Chapel of Ease Act 1809 (49 Geo. 3. c. cxv)) for building a Chapel of Ease in the Town of Worthing in the County of Sussex.
St. John's Church in Roundhay Act 1824	5 Geo. 4. c. xxi	12 April 1824
An Act for building a Church or Chapel of Ease in the Township of Roundhay, and Parish of Barwick in Elmet, in the West Riding of the County of York.
Plymouth Improvement Act 1824 (repealed)	5 Geo. 4. c. xxii	12 April 1824
An Act for better paving, lighting, cleansing, watching and improving the Town and Borough of Plymouth in the County of Devon; and for regulating the Police thereof; and for removing and preventing Nuisances and Annoyances therein. (Repealed by Plymouth City Council Act 1987 (c. iv))
Keighley Improvement Act 1824 (repealed)	5 Geo. 4. c. xxiii	12 April 1824
An Act for paving, lighting, cleansing, watching, regulating and otherwise improving the Town of Keighley, within the Parish of Keighley in the West Riding of the County of York. (Repealed by West Yorkshire Act 1980 (c. xiv))
Sandon Roads (Cheshire and Staffordshire) Act 1824	5 Geo. 4. c. xxiv	12 April 1824
An Act for amending, repairing and maintaining the Road from Sandon in the County of Stafford, to Bullock Smithy in the County of Chester; and from Hilderstone to Draycott in the Moors, and from Wetley Rocks to Tean in the said County of Stafford.
Span Smithy and Talke Road Act 1824	5 Geo. 4. c. xxv	12 April 1824
An Act for improving and keeping in Repair the Road from Span Smith, in the County of Chester, to Talk in the County of Stafford.
Lairy Embankment Act 1824	5 Geo. 4. c. xxvi	12 April 1824
An Act for further extending the Powers of the Company of Proprietors for embanking Part of the Lairy near Plymouth.
Wedmore Roads (Somerset) Maintenance and Repair Act 1824	5 Geo. 4. c. xxvii	12 April 1824
An Act for exonerating the Inhabitants of the several Hamlets, Tithings and Places within the Parish of Wedmore in the County of Somerset, from the exclusive Maintenance and Repair of the Public Highways within the Limits of the said Hamlets, Tithings and Places respectively, and for charging the same in future on the Inhabitants at large of the said Parish.
Broadway and Mickleton Road Act 1824 (repealed)	5 Geo. 4. c. xxviii	12 April 1824
An Act for repairing the Road leading from the Worcester Turnpike Road, in the Village of Broadway in the County of Worcester, to the Stratford-upon-Avon Turnpike Road, in the Village of Mickleton in the County of Gloucester. (Repealed by Annual Turnpike Acts Continuance Act 1875 (38 & 39 Vict. c. cxciv))
Redbrook and St. Arvans Turnpike Road and River Wye Bridge Act 1824 (repealed)	5 Geo. 4. c. xxix	12 April 1824
An Act for making a Turnpike Road from Redbrook to Saint Arvans in the County of Monmouth, and for building a Bridge on the Line of the said Road over the River Wye, and for making other Turnpike Roads to communicate therewith, in the Counties of Monmouth and Gloucester. (Repealed by Abbey Tintern and Bigswear Turnpike Roads Act 1852 (15 & 16 Vict. c. lxxi))
Roads to and from Cerne Abbas Act 1824	5 Geo. 4. c. xxx	12 April 1824
An Act for repairing, improving and maintaining several Roads leading to and from Cerne Abbas in the County of Dorset.
Roads from Kingsbridge to Dartmouth Act 1824 (repealed)	5 Geo. 4. c. xxxi	12 April 1824
An Act for making and maintaining certain Roads from Kingsbridge to Dartmouth, Modbury, Salcombe and other Places in the South Part of the County of Devon. (Repealed by Roads from Kingsbridge to Dartmouth Act 1828 (9 Geo. 4. c. xii))
Roads from Whitchurch (Salop.) and from Hinstock Act 1824	5 Geo. 4. c. xxxii	12 April 1824
An Act for more effectually amending the Roads from Whitchurch in the County of Salop, to that Part of the Road leading from Nantwich in the County of Chester, to Newcastle-under-Lyne in the County of Stafford, which passes through the Township of Madeley in the said County of Stafford; and also from Hinstock in the said County of Salop, to Nantwich aforesaid.
Road from Worcester through Droitwich to Bromsgrove Act 1824 (repealed)	5 Geo. 4. c. xxxiii	12 April 1824
An Act for widening, improving and maintaining the Turnpike Road leading from the City of Worcester, through Droitwich to Spadesbourne Bridge, within the Parish of Bromsgrove in the County of Worcester, and other Roads therein mentioned. (Repealed by Droitwich Roads Act 1859 (22 & 23 Vict. c. lxvi))
Durham, Cumberland, Northumberland and North Yorkshire Roads and Tyne Bridges Act 1824 (repealed)	5 Geo. 4. c. xxxiv	12 April 1824
An Act for repairing the Road from Burtryford in the County of Durham, through Alston in the County of Cumberland, to Burnstones in the County of Northumberland, and from Summerrod's Bar near Hexham to Alston aforesaid, and several other Roads in the said Counties, and in the North Riding of the County of York, and for erecting Bridges over the River Tyne. (Repealed by Alston Road Act 1853 (16 & 17 Vict. c. cxii))
Road from Glossop to Marple Bridge Act 1824 (repealed)	5 Geo. 4. c. xxxv	12 April 1824
An Act for amending and improving the Road from Glossop to Marple Bridge in the County of Derby, and the several Branches of Roads leading to and from the same. (Repealed by Glossop and Marple Bridge Turnpike Roads Act 1860 (23 & 24 Vict. c. xxi))
Stafford and Clotton Road Act 1824 (repealed)	5 Geo. 4. c. xxxvi	12 April 1824
An Act for improving and keeping in Repair the Road from the End of the County of Stafford to the City of Chester, lying betwixt the End of the said County of Stafford and One hundred Yards of the East End of a certain Smithy called Duddon Smithy in Clotton in the said County of Chester. (Repealed by Nantwich and Woore Road Act 1853 (16 & 17 Vict. c. cxlvii))
Ayr Gaol and Court House Act 1824	5 Geo. 4. c. xxxvii	15 April 1824
An Act to alter and amend An Act (Note: Ayr Gaol and Courthouse Act 1816 (56 Geo. 3. c. xix)) for erecting a New Gaol and Court House in the Burgh of Ayr in the Shire of Ayr.
Kelso Two Pennies Scots Act 1824 (repealed)	5 Geo. 4. c. xxxviii	15 April 1824
An Act for continuing and enlarging the Term and Powers of several Acts passed in the Thirty second Year of the Reign of King George the Second, (Note: Kelso Beer Duties Act 1758 (32 Geo. 2. c. 56)) and the Twentieth (Note: Kelso Beer Duties Act 1780 (20 Geo. 3. c. 11)) and Forty second (Note: Kelso Two Pennies Scots Act 1802 (42 Geo. 3. c. xxxiii)) Years of His late Majesty King George the Third, charging a Duty of Two Pennies Scots, or One sixth Part of a Penny Sterling, upon every Scots Pint of Ale, Porter and Beer brewed for Sale, brought into, tapped or sold within the Town and Parish of Kelso in the County of Roxburgh, for the Purposes therein mentioned. (Repealed by Statute Law (Repeals) Act 2013 (c. 2))
Trinity House of Leith Act 1824 (repealed)	5 Geo. 4. c. xxxix	15 April 1824
An Act to alter and amend An Act (Note: Trinity House of Leith Act 1820 (1 Geo. 4. c. xxxvii)) for the Regulation of the Corporation of the Masters and Assistants of the Trinity House of Leith. (Repealed by Corporation of the Trinity House of Leith Order Confirmation Act 1965 (c. xliii))
Maidenhead Chapel Act 1824	5 Geo. 4. c. xl	15 April 1824
An Act for taking down, rebuilding and enlarging Maidenhead Chapel in the County of Berks.
South Lynn Poor Relief Act 1824 (repealed)	5 Geo. 4. c. xli	15 April 1824
An Act for the better levying and collecting the Rates for the Relief and Maintenance of the Poor of the Parish of South Lynn, otherwise All Saints, in the Borough of King's Lynn in the County of Norfolk, by assessing the Owners of certain Messuages, and other Property in the said Parish, instead of the Occupiers thereof; and also for erecting a Workhouse in the same Parish. (Repealed by Statute Law (Repeals) Act 2013 (c. 2))
Dublin Oil Gas Light Company Act 1824 (repealed)	5 Geo. 4. c. xlii	15 April 1824
An Act for lighting the City of Dublin and Environs thereof with Oil Gas. (Repealed by United General Gaslight Company's Act 1866 (29 & 30 Vict. c. cxcix))
Road from Dunchurch to Stonebridge Act 1824	5 Geo. 4. c. xliii	15 April 1824
An Act foe repairing the Road from Dunchurch to Stonebridge in the County of Warwick.
Road from Colne to Clithero Act 1824 (repealed)	5 Geo. 4. c. xliv	15 April 1824
An Act for making and maintaining a Turnpike Road from Colne in the County of Lancaster, to communicate with the Road leading from Clitheroe in the same County, to Skipton in the County of York. (Repealed by Annual Turnpike Acts Continuance Act 1875 (38 & 39 Vict. c. cxciv))
Rugeley and Alrewas Turnpike Road Act 1824 (repealed)	5 Geo. 4. c. xlv	15 April 1824
An Act for making and maintaining a Turnpike Road from Rugeley, through Armitage to Alrewas, with a Branch therefrom in the County of Stafford. (Repealed by Road from Coleshill through Lichfield, and Rugeley and Alrewas Road Act 1834 (4 & 5 Will. 4. c. xxviii))
Road from Trent Bridge to Cotes Bridge Act 1824 (repealed)	5 Geo. 4. c. xlvi	15 April 1824
An Act for more effectually repairing the Road from the Trent Bridge in the County of the Town of Nottingham, to Cote's Bridge in the County of Leicester. (Repealed by Nottingham and Loughborough Road Act 1855 (18 & 19 Vict. c. lxxi))
Hertford Union Canal Act 1824	5 Geo. 4. c. xlvii	17 May 1824
An Act for making and maintaining a Navigable Canal from the River Lee Navigation in the Parish of Saint Mary Stratford Bow in the County of Middlesex, to join the Regents Canal at or near a Place called Old Ford Lock in the Parish of Saint Matthew Bethnal Green in the said County of Middlesex.
Stockton and Darlington Railway Act 1824 (repealed)	5 Geo. 4. c. xlviii	17 May 1824
An Act to authorize the Company of Proprietors of the Stockton and Darlington Railway to relinquish one of their Branch Railways, and to enable them to make another Branch Railway in lieu thereof; and to enable the said Company to raise a further Sum of Money, and to enlarge the Powers and Provisions of the several Acts (Note: Stockton and Darlington Railway Act 1821 (1 & 2 Geo. 4. c. xliv)) (Note: Stockton and Darlington Railway Act 1823 (4 Geo. 4. c. xxxiii)) relating to the said Railway. (Repealed by Stockton and Darlington Railway (Consolidation of Acts, Increase of Capital and Purchase of Middlesbrough Dock) Act 1849 (12 & 13 Vict. c. liv))
Monkland and Kirkintilloch Railway Act 1824	5 Geo. 4. c. xlix	17 May 1824
An Act for making a Railway from Palace-Craig in the Parish of Old Monkland in the County of Lanark, to the Forth and Clyde Canal near Kirkintilloch in the County of Dumbarton.
Blackburn Parish Church, Burial Ground and Rates Act 1824	5 Geo. 4. c. l	17 May 1824
An Act for enlarging the Powers and Provisions of an Act of His late Majesty, intituled "An Act for taking down and rebuilding the Parish Church of Blackburn in the County Palatine of Lancaster, and for providing additional Burial Ground, and for equalizing the Church Rates in the said Parish, and other Purposes." (Note: Blackburn Parish Church, Burial Ground and Rates Act 1819 (59 Geo. 3. c. lxv))
Bilston Market and Town Hall Act 1824	5 Geo. 4. c. li	17 May 1824
An Act for establishing and regulating a Market and for erecting a Town Hall and Market Place in the Township of Bilston in the County of Stafford.
Birmingham Assay Masters Act 1824	5 Geo. 4. c. lii	17 May 1824
An Act for repealing so much of an Act of the Thirteenth Year of the Reign of His late Majesty King George the Third, intituled "An Act for appointing Wardens and Assay Masters for assaying Wrought Plate in the Towns of Sheffield and Birmingham," (Note: Plate Assay (Sheffield and Birmingham) Act 1772 (13 Geo. 3. c. 52)) as relates to the Town of Birmingham, and within Twenty Miles thereof; and for granting further and more effectual Powers for assaying and marking Gold and Silver Plate wrought or made within the said Town of Birmingham and within Thirty Miles thereof, and for other Purposes relating thereto.
Ashford Improvement Act 1824 (repealed)	5 Geo. 4. c. liii	17 May 1824
An Act for lighting, watching and otherwise improving the Town of Ashford in the County of Kent. (Repealed by County of Kent Act 1981 (c. xviii))
Scartho and Louth Road Act 1824	5 Geo. 4. c. liv	17 May 1824
An Act for repairing and improving the Road from Back Lane in the Parish of Scartho to Hollowgate Head in the Parish of Louth in the County of Lincoln.
Blackburn and Preston Road and Ribble Bridge Act 1824 (repealed)	5 Geo. 4. c. lv	17 May 1824
An Act for making and maintaining a Road from Blackburn to Preston, and Two Branches therefrom, and erecting a Bridge on the Line of the said Road over the River Ribble, all in the County Palatine of Lancaster. (Repealed by Blackburn and Preston Turnpike Road Act 1852 (15 & 16 Vict. c. cxix))
Road from Greenwich to Woolwich Act 1824	5 Geo. 4. c. lvi	17 May 1824
An Act for repairing the Lower Road from Greenwich to Woolwich in the County of Kent.
Spittle Head Bridge and Littleborough Ferry Road (Nottinghamshire) Act 1824 (repealed)	5 Geo. 4. c. lvii	17 May 1824
An Act for making and maintaining a Turnpike Road leading from the Eastern Side of a certain Bridge called Spittle Hill Bridge, over Moorgate Beck in the Parish of Clarborough in the County of Nottingham, to Littleborough Ferry in the same County. (Repealed by Retford and Littleborough Turnpike Road Act 1852 (15 & 16 Vict. c. xl))
Roads from Stafford and from Bridgeford Act 1824 (repealed)	5 Geo. 4. c. lviii	17 May 1824
An Act for amending and maintaining the Roads from Stafford to Sandon in the County of Stafford, and from Stafford through Bridgford and Eccleshall to Ireland's Cross near Woore in the County of Salop, and from Bridgford aforesaid to the Stone which divides the Liberty of Ranton and Ellenhall in the Road between Bridgford and Newport. (Repealed by Stafford, Sandon and Eccleshall Turnpike Roads Act 1831 (1 Will. 4. c. xxx))
Stone, Stafford and Penkridge Turnpike Road Act 1824 (repealed)	5 Geo. 4. c. lix	17 May 1824
An Act for amending and maintaining the Road from the Town of Stone to Gaol Gate in the Borough of Stafford, and from Green Gate in the said Borough, through the Towns of Dunston and Penkridge to Streetway Road, in the Road leading to Wolverhampton in the County of Stafford. (Repealed by Stone and Stafford, and Stafford and Streetway Roads Act 1831 (1 Will. 4. c. xxxi))
Cambridge and Ely Roads Act 1824 (repealed)	5 Geo. 4. c. lx	17 May 1824
An Act for amending and improving the Road from Cambridge to Ely, and other Roads therein mentioned, in the County of Cambridge; and for making a Road from or near the Town of Littleport in the Isle of Ely, to the Ferry or Floating Bridge over the Hundred Feet River, in the Parish of Welney in the County of Norfolk. (Repealed by Cambridge and Ely Roads Act 1852 (15 & 16 Vict. c. cxxxiv))
City Road Act 1824 (repealed)	5 Geo. 4. c. lxi	17 May 1824
An Act for more effectually amending, improving and keeping in Repair the Road from the North East Side of the Goswell Street Road next Islington, to the North West Corner of Finsbury Square, by the Artillery Ground, in the County of Middlesex, commonly called and known by the Name of The City Road. (Repealed by Metropolis Roads Act 1826 (7 Geo. 4. c. cxlii))
Faversham, Hythe and Canterbury Roads Act 1824 (repealed)	5 Geo. 4. c. lxii	17 May 1824
An Act for more effectually repairing the Road from the Post Road near Faversham, by Bacon's Water, through Ashford, to Hythe, and from Bacon's Water to Castle Street, in the City of Canterbury, all in the County of Kent. (Repealed by Faversham, Hythe and Canterbury Road Act 1831 (1 Will. 4. c. vi))
Barnsley Church, Churchyard and Burial Grounds Act 1824 (repealed)	5 Geo. 4. c. lxiii	28 May 1824
An Act for raising a further Sum of Money for carrying into Execution an Act passed in the Fifty ninth Year of the Reign of His late Majesty King George the Third, intituled "An Act for repairing and improving, or rebuilding, the Church at Barnsley in the West Riding of the County of York, and for improving and enlarging the Churchyard and Burial Grounds thereof;" (Note: Barnsley Church and Burial Grounds Act 1819 (59 Geo. 3. c. cxiv)) and for amending the said Act. (Repealed by Beckett Hospital and Dispensary, Barnsley Act 1944 (7 & 8 Geo. 6. c. ii))
Oldham Church, Burial Ground and Church Rates Act 1824	5 Geo. 4. c. lxiv	28 May 1824
An Act for taking down and rebuilding the Body of the Church or ancient Parochial Chapel of Ease of Oldham, within the Parish of Prestwich-cum-Oldham, in the County Palatine of Lancaster, for providing additional Burial Ground, and for equalizing the Church Rates, and other Purposes.
Kensington Canal Act 1824	5 Geo. 4. c. lxv	28 May 1824
An Act for widening, deepening, enlarging and making navigable a certain Creek called Counter's Creek, from or from near Counter's Bridge, on the Road from London to Hammersmith, to the River Thames in the County of Middlesex, and for maintaining the same.
Lancaster Improvement Act 1824 (repealed)	5 Geo. 4. c. lxvi	28 May 1824
An Act for lighting, watching, paving, cleansing and improving the Streets, Highways and Places within the Borough and Town of Lancaster in the County Palatine of Lancaster. (Repealed by County of Lancashire Act 1984 (c. xxi))
Evesham Improvement Act 1824	5 Geo. 4. c. lxvii	28 May 1824
An Act for paving, cleansing, lighting, watching, regulating, and improving the Borough of Evesham in the County of Worcester; for repairing, improving and maintaining the Bridge over the River Avon within the said Borough, and for selling certain Waste Lands within the said Borough, and for appropriating the Monies arising from such Sales towards the Purposes therein mentioned.
Walsall Improvement Act 1824 (repealed)	5 Geo. 4. c. lxviii	28 May 1824
An Act for paving, lighting, watching, cleansing, widening, regulating and otherwise improving the Town of Walsall and the Neighbourhood thereof, within the Parish of Walsall in the County of Stafford. (Repealed by Walsall Improvement and Market Act 1848 (11 & 12 Vict. c. clxi))
London Street, Glasgow Act 1824	5 Geo. 4. c. lxix	28 May 1824
An Act to amend an Act of His present Majesty, (Note: Glasgow Improvement Act 1820 (1 Geo. 4. c. lxxxviii)) for opening a Street from the Cross of Glasgow to Monteith Row.
Battle Bridge Fields Improvement Act 1824 (repealed)	5 Geo. 4. c. lxx	28 May 1824
An Act for forming, paving, cleansing, lighting, watching and regulating Streets, and other Public Passages and Places, on certain Plots of Ground called Battle Bridge Fields, near Gray's Inn Lane, in the Parish of Saint Pancras, in the County of Middlesex. (Repealed by London Government (Borough of St. Pancras) Order in Council 1901 (SR&O 1901/274))
Australian Company of Edinburgh Act 1824	5 Geo. 4. c. lxxi	28 May 1824
An Act to enable the Australian Company of Edinburgh to sue and be sued in the Name of the Manager for the Time being of the said Company.
Newcastle-upon-Tyne Coal Trade Act 1824	5 Geo. 4. c. lxxii	28 May 1824
An Act to regulate the loading of Ships with Coals in the Port of Newcastle upon Tyne.
Liverpool Port Pilotage Act 1824 (repealed)	5 Geo. 4. c. lxxiii	28 May 1824
An Act for the better Regulation and Encouragement of Pilots for the conducting of Ships and Vessels into and out of the Port of Liverpool. (Repealed by Mersey Dock Acts Consolidation Act 1858 (21 & 22 Vict. c. xcii))
St. John Southwark Vestry Voting Act 1824 (repealed)	5 Geo. 4. c. lxxiv	28 May 1824
An Act to amend and enlarge the Powers of several Acts, (Note: Horsleydown Parish Act 1732 (6 Geo. 2. c. 11)) (Note: Southwark (Poor Relief) Act 1786 (26 Geo. 3. c. 114)) so far as the same relate to the Right of voting at Vestries of the Parish of Saint John Southwark in the County of Surrey; and to establish a Select Vestry within the said Parish. (Repealed by London Government (Borough of Bermondsey) Order in Council 1901 (SR&O 1901/264))
Margate, Ramsgate and Broadstairs Gas Act 1824	5 Geo. 4. c. lxxv	28 May 1824
An Act for lighting with Gas the Towns or Villages of Margate, Ramsgate and Broadstairs, and Places adjacent, in the County of Kent.
Edinburgh Oil Gas Light Company Act 1824	5 Geo. 4. c. lxxvi	28 May 1824
An Act for the better lighting the City and Suburbs of Edinburgh by Oil Gas.
Hereford Gas Act 1824 (repealed)	5 Geo. 4. c. lxxvii	28 May 1824
An Act for lighting with Gas the City of Hereford, and the Suburbs and Liberties thereof. (Repealed by Hereford Improvement Act 1854 (17 & 18 Vict. c. xxxi))
Phœnix Gas Act 1824 or the Southwark Gas Act 1824	5 Geo. 4. c. lxxviii	28 May 1824
An Act to establish an additional Company for more effectually lighting with Gas certain Places within the Borough of Southwark, and certain other Parishes and Places in the Counties of Surrey and Kent.
Clifton Gas Act 1824	5 Geo. 4. c. lxxix	28 May 1824
An Act for lighting and watching the Parish of Clifton in the County of Gloucester.
Kent Fire Insurance Company Act 1824	5 Geo. 4. c. lxxx	28 May 1824
An Act to enable the Kent Fire Insurance Company to sue and prosecute in the Name of their Secretary, or any Member of such Company.
Great Torrington Roads Act 1824 (repealed)	5 Geo. 4. c. lxxxi	28 May 1824
An Act for more effectually improving and keeping in Repair the several Roads in and near Great Torrington; and to make a new Line of Road on the Western Side of the River Torridge, in the County of Devon. (Repealed by Great Torrington Roads Act 1828 (9 Geo. 4. c. xxxv))
Leeds and Collingham Turnpike Act 1824	5 Geo. 4. c. lxxxii	28 May 1824
An Act for making and maintaining a Turnpike Road from Roundhay Bridge to Collingham in the County of York.
Whiteparish, Romsey and Southampton Turnpike Roads Act 1824	5 Geo. 4. c. lxxxiii	28 May 1824
An Act for amending the Roads leading from Brickworth Pond, in the Parish of Whiteparish in the County of Wilts, through Romsey in the County of Southampton, to the County of the Town of Southampton.
Carmarthen and Newcastle Emlyn Road Act 1824 (repealed)	5 Geo. 4. c. lxxxiv	28 May 1824
An Act for repairing, widening and keeping in Repair the Road from the Town of Carmarthen, through Velindre Shinkin, to the Town of Newcastle Emlyn, and several other Roads in the County of Carmarthen. (Repealed by Road from Carmarthen to Newcastle Emlyn Act 1835 (5 & 6 Will. 4. c. iii))
Grampound, St. Austell and Lostwithiel Road Act 1824 (repealed)	5 Geo. 4. c. lxxxv	28 May 1824
An Act for more effectually repairing and improving the Road leading from the Eastern End of the Borough of Grampound in the County of Cornwall, through the Towns of Saint Austell and Lostwithiel, and thence to the East End of the Western Taphouse Lane in the said County. (Repealed by Grampound and Western Taphouse Lane Road (Cornwall) Act 1836 (6 & 7 Will. 4. c. lxii))
Road from Sacred Gate to Patrington Creek (Yorkshire) Act 1824 (repealed)	5 Geo. 4. c. lxxxvi	28 May 1824
An Act for amending and improving the Road from Sacred Gate in the Township of Thorngumbald, to Pattrington Haven, and from the Guide Post in Winestead to the Township of South Frodingham, in the East Riding of the County of York. (Repealed by Hedon and Patrington Road Act 1864 (27 & 28 Vict. c. lii))
Wilmslow Bridge and Church Lawton Road Act 1824 (repealed)	5 Geo. 4. c. lxxxvii	28 May 1824
An Act for more effectually repairing and improving the Road from Wilmslow Bridge in the County of Chester, through Nether Alderney and Congleton, to or near the Red Bull, in Church Lawton, in the said County. (Repealed by Wilmslow and Lawton Road Act 1857 (20 & 21 Vict. c. xxxi))
Road from St. Dunstan's Cross, Canterbury to Whitstable Act 1824	5 Geo. 4. c. lxxxviii	28 May 1824
An Act for more effectually repairing the Roads leading from Saint Dunstan's Cross to North Lane near to the City of Canterbury, and to the Sea Side at Whitstable, in the County of Kent, and for widening and improving the Road from North Lane aforesaid, over West Gate Bridge, to the West Gate of the said City, and for making a Foot Bridge on each Side of the said Bridge and Gate into the said City.
Salterhebble, Stainland and Sowerby Bridge Roads Act 1824 (repealed)	5 Geo. 4. c. lxxxix	28 May 1824
An Act for making and maintaining a new Road from Salterhebble in the Parish of Halifax, to the Huddersfield and New Hey Turnpike Road in the Parish of Huddersfield, and several Branches therefrom, in the West Riding of the County of York, with certain Bridges on the Line of the said Road and Branches. (Repealed by Salterhebble Road and Sowerby Bridge Road (West Yorkshire) Act 1838 (1 & 2 Vict. c. xlii))
Holme Lane End and Heckmondwike Road (Yorkshire, West Riding) Act 1824	5 Geo. 4. c. xc	28 May 1824
An Act for making and maintaining a Turnpike Road from the Turnpike Road leading from Bradford to Wakefield in the West Riding of the County of York, near Holme Lane End, in the Parish of Birstal in the said Riding, to the Turnpike Road leading from Birstal to Huddersfield in the said Riding, at the Township of Heckmondwike, in the Parish of Birstal aforesaid, with a Branch Road therefrom.
Brighthelmstone and Newhaven Road Act 1824	5 Geo. 4. c. xci	28 May 1824
An Act for making and maintaining a Road from Brighthelmstone (Note: Brighthelmstone is now known as Brighton.) to Newhaven, in the County of Sussex.
Burrow Bridge (Somerset) Act 1824 or the Burrow Bridge Act 1824	5 Geo. 4. c. xcii	3 June 1824
An Act for taking down Burrow Bridge, over the River Parrett, in the County of Somerset, and erecting another in lieu thereof.
Dingwall Improvement Act 1824	5 Geo. 4. c. xciii	3 June 1824
An Act for maintaining the Harbour of the Burgh of Dingwall, and regulating the Police of the said Burgh.
Littlehampton Ferry Act 1824	5 Geo. 4. c. xciv	3 June 1824
An Act for establishing a Ferry over the River Arun, at Littlehampton, in the County of Sussex, and making Roads to communicate therewith.
Hulme Improvement Act 1824	5 Geo. 4. c. xcv	3 June 1824
An Act for lighting, cleansing, watching and improving the Township of Hulme in the County of Lancaster, and for regulating the Police thereof.
River Welland Outfall Act 1824	5 Geo. 4. c. xcvi	3 June 1824
An Act for explaining, amending and rendering more effectual an Act of His late Majesty, (Note: Lincoln Drainage, etc. Act 1794 (34 Geo. 3. c. 102)) for improving the Outfall of the River Wetland in the County of Lincoln.
Roads to and from Bridport Act 1824 (repealed)	5 Geo. 4. c. xcvii	3 June 1824
An Act for repairing, widening, improving and maintaining in repair the First District of Turnpike Roads leading to and from the Town of Bridport in the County of Dorset. (Repealed by Bridport Roads (First District) Act 1855 (18 & 19 Vict. c. cxi))
Langport, Somerton and Castle Cary Roads Act 1824 (repealed)	5 Geo. 4. c. xcviii	3 June 1824
An Act for more effectually repairing and improving certain Roads leading to, through and from the Towns of Langport, Somerton and Castle Cary, in the County of Somerset, and for making and improving other Roads in the said County. (Repealed by Langport, Somerton and Castle Cary Turnpike Roads Act 1857 (20 & 21 Vict. c. lvi))
Stokenchurch and New Woodstock Road Act 1824 (repealed)	5 Geo. 4. c. xcix	3 June 1824
An Act for repairing certain Roads between Stokenchurch and the Borough of New Woodstock in the County of Oxford, and several other Roads communicating therewith. (Repealed by Stokenchurch and New Woodstock Road and Branches Act 1845 (8 & 9 Vict. c. xxx))
Roads through Cheltenham Act 1824 (repealed)	5 Geo. 4. c. c	3 June 1824
An Act for more effectually repairing the Road from Piffs Elms in the Parish of Boddington, through Cheltenham, to Shipton Lane, near Frog Mill Inn, and certain other Roads therein mentioned, in the County of Gloucester. (Repealed by Cheltenham Roads Act 1831 (1 & 2 Will. 4. c. xvi))
Ashby-de-la-Zouch and Tutbury Road Act 1824	5 Geo. 4. c. ci	3 June 1824
An Act for more effectually repairing the Road from Ashby de la Zouch in the County of Leicester, through Burton upon Trent in the County of Stafford, to Tutbury in the said County of Stafford.
Road from Durham to Tyne Bridge Act 1824	5 Geo. 4. c. cii	3 June 1824
An Act for repairing the Road from the City of Durham to Tyne Bridge, and for making and maintaining a collateral Branch and certain other Branches to communicate respectively with certain Parts of the said Road, in the Parishes of Chester le Street and Gateshead, all in the County of Durham.
Halifax to Sheffield Road (First District) Act 1824 or the Halifax and Huddersfield Turnpike Act 1824 (repealed)	5 Geo. 4. c. ciii	3 June 1824
An Act for enlarging the Term and Powers of several Acts (Note: Halifax to Sheffield Road Act 1777 (17 Geo. 3. c. 106)) (Note: Halifax to Sheffield Road Act 1793 (33 Geo. 3. c. 142)) (Note: Halifax and Huddersfield Road Act 1818 (58 Geo. 3. c. xxxiii)) passed for repairing the Road from Halifax to Sheffield in the West Riding of the County of York, so far as relates to the First District of the Roads mentioned in the said Acts. (Repealed by Halifax and Huddersfield Turnpike Road Act 1856 (19 & 20 Vict. c. lxxxiv))
Roads in Radnor, Hereford and Merioneth Act 1824 (repealed)	5 Geo. 4. c. civ	3 June 1824
An Act for making, repairing and improving several Roads in the Counties of Radnor, Hereford and Merioneth. (Repealed by Turnpike Trusts in South Wales Act 1844 (7 & 8 Vict. c. 91))
Bolton and Nightingale Road and other Roads in Lancashire Act 1824 (repealed)	5 Geo. 4. c. cv	3 June 1824
An Act for improving and more effectually repairing the Roads from the Town of Bolton in the Moors to Nightingales in the Township of Heath Charnock, and for making a Branch Road from Little Bolton to or near the Crown in Harwich; and for enabling the Trustees therein named, together with the Trustees North and South of Yarrow, and the Trustees of the Road from Westhoughton to Duxbury Stocks, to make a new Line of Road from Hole House Brain in the said Township to the Town of Chorley, and a Branch Road from Rawlinson Bridge to Halliwell Field in the same Township, and another Branch Road in the Township of Duxbury, all in the County Palatine of Lancaster. (Repealed by Bolton and Nightingale Road Act 1855 (18 & 19 Vict. c. clxi))
Road from Godley Lane Head (Yorkshire, West Riding) Act 1824 (repealed)	5 Geo. 4. c. cvi	3 June 1824
An Act for making and maintaining a Turnpike Road from Godley Lane Head, near Halifax, to Northowram Green in the West Riding of the County of York. (Repealed by Godley Lane Head and Northowram Road (Yorkshire, West Riding) Act 1827 (7 & 8 Geo. 4. c. vi))
Glasgow and Parkhead Road Act 1824	5 Geo. 4. c. cvii	3 June 1824
An Act for making and maintaining a Road from the City of Glasgow to the Village of Parkhead.
Brompton Square Improvement Act 1824 (repealed)	5 Geo. 4. c. cviii	4 June 1824
An Act to provide for the paving, gravelling, lighting and watching certain Footways and Carriageways in and near Brompton Square in the Parish of Saint Mary Abbotts Kensington in the County of Middlesex; and to provide for the Maintenance of a Garden and Shrubbery in the said Square. (Repealed by Kensington Improvement Act 1851 (14 & 15 Vict. c. cxvi))
Maidstone Markets Act 1824 (repealed)	5 Geo. 4. c. cix	4 June 1824
An Act for erecting New Market Places within the Town of Maidstone in the County of Kent, and for the better, regulating and maintaining the said Markets. (Repealed by County of Kent Act 1981 (c. xviii))
Leeds Gas Act 1824	5 Geo. 4. c. cx	4 June 1824
An Act for lighting with Gas the Town and Neighbourhood of Leeds, within the Parish of Leeds, in the West Riding of the County of York.
Road from Glasgow to Yoker Bridge Act 1824 (repealed)	5 Geo. 4. c. cxi	4 June 1824
An Act for more effectually making and repairing the Road from the City of Glasgow to Yoker Bridge, and certain Roads communicating therewith. (Repealed by Road from Glasgow to Yoker Bridge Act 1845 (8 & 9 Vict. c. cxcv))
Hammersmith Bridge Act 1824 (repealed)	5 Geo. 4. c. cxii	9 June 1824
An Act for building a Bridge over the River Thames, from the Hamlet of Hammersmith in the County of Middlesex, to the Parish of Barnes in the County of Surrey, and for making convenient Roads and Avenues to communicate with such Bridge. (Repealed by Hammersmith Bridge Act 1828 (9 Geo. 4. c. lii))
Lary Bridge Act 1824 (repealed)	5 Geo. 4. c. cxiii	9 June 1824
An Act for altering and amending an Act of the last Session of Parliament, (Note: Lary Bridge Act 1823 (4 Geo. 4. c. x)) for erecting a Bridge over the Water of Lary in the County of Devon. (Repealed by Plymouth City Council Act 1987 (c. iv))
Teignmouth and Shaldon Bridge Act 1824	5 Geo. 4. c. cxiv	9 June 1824
An Act for building a Bridge over the River Teign, at Teignmouth, in the County of Devon; and for making Approaches to the same.
Bideford Roads Act 1824 (repealed)	5 Geo. 4. c. cxv	9 June 1824
An Act for improving and keeping in Repair several Roads in and near the Town of Bideford, and for making a new Line of Road on the Western Side of the River Torridge; and also a new Line of Road to unite such Road with the Road leading from Bideford to Buckland Brewer, in the County of Devon. (Repealed by Bideford Roads Act 1828 (9 Geo. 4. c. cxv))
Road from Porthdinllaen and other roads (Carnarvonshire) Act 1824 (repealed)	5 Geo. 4. c. cxvi	9 June 1824
An Act for amending and improving the Road from Porthdinllaen to or near Cerrig y Rhwydwr, and from Tan y Graig in the Parish of Bodvean to Pwllheli, and from thence to Llanystymdwy, and from Cerrig y Rhwydwr aforesaid to or near Capel Cerrig, and for making a Road from Pwllheli aforesaid, to Penrhyndu in the Parish of Llanengan, all in the County of Caernarvon. (Repealed by Porthdinllaen and Nanthwynant Turnpike Roads Act 1852 (15 & 16 Vict. c. i))
East India Company and the Rajah of Tanjore Act 1824 (repealed)	5 Geo. 4. c. cxvii	17 June 1824
An Act for enabling the Commissioners acting in Execution of an Agreement made between the East India Company and the private Creditors of His late Highness Ameer Sing, formerly Rajah of Tanjore, deceased, the better to carry the same into Effect. (Repealed by Statute Law (Repeals) Act 2008 (c. 12))
Dublin Rates Act 1824	5 Geo. 4. c. cxviii	17 June 1824
An Act to provide for valuing the Houses situate in and near the City of Dublin, and for the more equal Payment of the Local Taxes there.
Thames and Medway Canal Act 1824	5 Geo. 4. c. cxix	17 June 1824
An Act for enabling the Thames and Medway Canal Company to raise a further Sum of Money to discharge their Debts, and to complete the said Canal and the Works thereunto belonging; and for altering, enlarging and rendering more effectual the Powers for making the said Canal and Works.
Bristol and Taunton Canal Navigation Act 1824	5 Geo. 4. c. cxx	17 June 1824
An Act to abridge, vary, extend and improve the Bristol and Taunton Canal Navigation; and to alter the Powers of an Act of the Fifty first Year of His late Majesty, (Note: Bristol and Taunton Canal Navigation Act 1811 (51 Geo. 3. c. lx)) for making the said Canal.
Redruth and Chasewater Railway Act 1824	5 Geo. 4. c. cxxi	17 June 1824
An Act for making and maintaining a Railway or Tramroad from the Town of Redruth in the County of Cornwall, to Point Quay in the Parish of Feock, in the same County, with several Branches therefrom; and also for restoring, improving and maintaining the Navigation of Restrongett Creek, in the same County.
Courtown (Wexford) Harbour Act 1824	5 Geo. 4. c. cxxii	17 June 1824
An Act for completing the Port or Harbour of Courtown, at Brenogue Head, in the County of Wexford.
Thames Navigation Act 1824 (repealed)	5 Geo. 4. c. cxxiii	17 June 1824
An Act to enable the Mayor and Commonalty and Citizens of the City of London to raise a Sum of Money at a reduced Rate of Interest, to pay off the Monies now charged on the Tolls and Duties payable by virtue of Four Acts of the Reign of His late Majesty King George the Third, (Note: Thames Navigation Act 1774 (14 Geo. 3. c. 91)) (Note: Thames Navigation Act 1776 (17 Geo. 3. c. 18)) (Note: Thames (West of London Bridge) Navigation Act 1810 (50 Geo. 3. c. cciv)) (Note: Thames (West of London Bridge) Navigation Act 1814 (54 Geo. 3. c. ccxxiii)) for improving the Navigation of the River Thames Westward of London Bridge, within the Liberties of the City of London. (Repealed by Thames Conservancy Act 1894 (57 & 58 Vict. c. clxxxvii))
Leeds Improvement Act 1824 (repealed)	5 Geo. 4. c. cxxiv	17 June 1824
An Act for lighting, cleansing and improving the Town and Neighbourhood of Leeds in the County of York. (Repealed by Leeds Improvement Act 1842 (5 & 6 Vict. c. civ))
St. Mary Islington Improvement Act 1824 (repealed)	5 Geo. 4. c. cxxv	17 June 1824
An Act to repeal several Acts (Note: London (Streets) Act 1772 (12 Geo. 3. c. 17)) (Note: Islington (Poor Relief, etc.) Act 1776 (17 Geo. 3. c. 5)) (Note: Highgate and Battle Bridge &c. Roads Act 1795 (35 Geo. 3. c. 147)) (Note: St. Mary Islington Poor Relief Act 1802 (42 Geo. 3. c. xxviii)) (Note: Islington Lighting and Watching Act 1806 (46 Geo. 3. c. i)) (Note: St. Mary Islington Chapel of Ease and Burial Ground Act 1811 (51 Geo. 3. c. cxxxiv)) (Note: St. Mary Islington Poor Relief and Workhouse Act 1813 (53 Geo. 3. c. xxi)) for the Relief and Employment of the Poor of the Parish of Saint Mary, Islington in the County of Middlesex; for lighting and watching and preventing Nuisances and Annoyances therein; for amending the Road from Highgate through Maiden Lane, and several other Roads in the said Parish; and for providing a Chapel of Ease and an additional Burial Ground for the same; and to make more effectual Provisions in lieu thereof. (Repealed by London Government (Borough of Islington) Order in Council 1901 (SR&O 1901/270))
Paddington Improvement Act 1824	5 Geo. 4. c. cxxvi	17 June 1824
An Act for better governing and regulating the Parish of Paddington in the County of Middlesex; for paving, lighting and watching such Parts of the said Parish as may be necessary; and for other Purposes relating to those Objects; and for altering and amending several Acts passed in the Twenty eighth, (Note: Paddington Parish Church Act 1788 (28 Geo. 3. c. 74)) Thirty third (Note: Paddington Parish Church Act 1793 (33 Geo. 3. c. 43)) and Fiftieth (Note: Paddington Church Yard Act 1810 (50 Geo. 3. c. xliv)) Years of the Reign of His late Majesty King George the Third, for rebuilding the Church and enlarging the Churchyard of the said Parish.
St. Nicholas Harwich Church Act 1824	5 Geo. 4. c. cxxvii	17 June 1824
An Act to amend an Act of the First and Second Year of His present Majesty, (Note: St. Nicholas in Harwich Parish Church Act 1821 (1 & 2 Geo. 4. c. cxiv)) for rebuilding the Church of Saint Nicholas Harwich in the County of Essex.
Bathgate Improvement Act 1824	5 Geo. 4. c. cxxviii	17 June 1824
An Act for erecting the Town of Bathgate in the County of Linlithgow into a free and independent Burgh of Barony; paving, lighting and improving the same, and establishing a Police therein.
Dundee Improvement and Bridewell Act 1824 (repealed)	5 Geo. 4. c. cxxix	17 June 1824
An Act for the better paving, lighting, watching and cleansing the Burgh of Dundee, and for building and maintaining a Bridewell there. (Repealed by Dundee Improvement Act 1837 (7 Will. 4 & 1 Vict. c. lix))
Bolton-le-Moors Water Act 1824 (repealed)	5 Geo. 4. c. cxxx	17 June 1824
An Act for supplying with Water the Towns of Great Bolton and Little Bolton, and the Township of Sharples in the Parish of Bolton le Moors, in the County Palatine of Lancaster. (Repealed by Bolton Waterworks Act 1843 (6 & 7 Vict. c. lxxiv))
Canterbury Water Act 1824 (repealed)	5 Geo. 4. c. cxxxi	17 June 1824
An Act for better supplying the City of Canterbury, and the several Streets and Roads adjoining thereto with Water. (Repealed by Canterbury Gas and Water Act 1866 (29 & 30 Vict. c. xcix))
Cheltenham Water Act 1824	5 Geo. 4. c. cxxxii	17 June 1824
An Act for better supplying the Town and Neighbourhood of Cheltenham in the County of Gloucester with Water.
Manchester Gas Act 1824	5 Geo. 4. c. cxxxiii	17 June 1824
An Act for better lighting with Gas the Town of Manchester, in the County Palatine of Lancaster.
Canterbury Market Act 1824 (repealed)	5 Geo. 4. c. cxxxiv	17 June 1824
An Act for erecting a Market House for the Sale of Corn, Hops and other Agricultural Produce in the City of Canterbury and County of the same City; for improving and enlarging the Market Places for the Sale of Provisions in the said City and County; and for regulating and maintaining the said Markets. (Repealed by County of Kent Act 1981 (c. xviii))
Newton Inclosure Act 1824	5 Geo. 4. c. cxxxv	17 June 1824
An Act for confirming certain Leases, and a Conveyance in Fee, of certain Plots of Land allotted by an Act, made in the Forty second Year of the Reign of King George the Third, (Note: Newton Inclosure Act 1802 (42 Geo. 3. c. 107 Pr.)) for dividing, allotting and inclosing the Common or Waste, situate in the Manor of Newton in the County Palatine of Lancaster, to the Overseers of the Poor of the Township of Newton; and for enabling the said Overseers to sell and convey in Fee other Plots of Land, all formerly Part of the said Waste, for building upon, in consideration of yearly Chief or Ground Rents to be reserved for the same.
Hibernian Mining Company Act 1824	5 Geo. 4. c. cxxxvi	17 June 1824
An Act to encourage the working of Mines in Ireland by means of English Capital, and to regulate a Joint Stock Company for that Purpose.
Alliance British and Foreign Life and Fire Assurance Company Act 1824 (repealed)	5 Geo. 4. c. cxxxvii	17 June 1824
An Act for enabling the Alliance British and Foreign Life and Fire Assurance Company to sue and be sued in the Name of the Chairman for the Time being, or of any other Member of the Company. (Repealed by Alliance Assurance Company's Act 1886 (49 & 50 Vict. c. lxxiv))
Road from Camden Town to Holloway Act 1824 (repealed)	5 Geo. 4. c. cxxxviii	17 June 1824
An Act for making and maintaining a Road from the Hampstead Road in Camden Town, to the North Road at Holloway in the Parish of Saint Mary Islington in the County of Middlesex. (Repealed by London Government (Borough of St. Pancras) Order in Council 1901 (SR&O 1901/274))
Harwell and Streatley Road (Berkshire) Act 1824 (repealed)	5 Geo. 4. c. cxxxix	17 June 1824
An Act for more effectually amending and keeping in Repair the Road leading from the London Turnpike Road, near the South or Upper End of Harwell Town, in the Parish of Harwell, in the County of Berks, to the Turnpike Road, near the Village of Streatley, in the said County. (Repealed by Road from Harwell to Streatley (Berkshire) Act 1845 (8 & 9 Vict. c. cli))
Evesham and Cheltenham Turnpike Roads Act 1824 (repealed)	5 Geo. 4. c. cxl	17 June 1824
An Act for maintaining and improving the Road leading from the London Turnpike Road, near the Borough of Evesham in the County of Worcester, to the Village of Bishop's Cleeve, near Cheltenham in the County of Gloucester. (Repealed by Statute Law (Repeals) Act 2013 (c. 2))
Road from Buckingham to Towcester Act 1824 (repealed)	5 Geo. 4. c. cxli	17 June 1824
An Act for repairing and amending the Road from the Town and Borough of Buckingham to the Oxford and Northampton Turnpike Road at Lord's Field Gate, near the Town of Towcester. (Repealed by Buckingham and Towcester Road Act 1854 (17 & 18 Vict. c. l))
Stretford's Bridge and Cross Moor Roads (Herefordshire and Salop.) Act 1824	5 Geo. 4. c. cxlii	17 June 1824
An Act for amending and widening the Roads leading from Stretford's Bridge, in the County of Hereford, to the Cross Moor, or Long Meadow End, in the County of Salop; and other Roads therein mentioned, in the said County of Hereford.
Farnworth and Ainsworth Turnpike Road Act 1824	5 Geo. 4. c. cxliii	17 June 1824
An Act for making and maintaining a Turnpike Road from the Road leading from Manchester to Bolton, to communicate with the Road from Bury to Bolton, in the County Palatine of Lancaster.
Roads Communicating with the West and East India Docks Act 1824 (repealed)	5 Geo. 4. c. cxliv	17 June 1824
An Act for enlarging the Term and Powers of several Acts of His late Majesty King George the Third, (Note: Roads from West India Docks Act 1802 (42 Geo. 3. c. ci)) (Note: West India Docks, Cannon Street and East India Docks Roads Act 1804 (44 Geo. 3. c. xxxvii)) (Note: Roads to the West and East India Docks Act 1806 (46 Geo. 3. c. cxxv)) (Note: Tilbury Fort Road Act 1808 (48 Geo. 3. c. xcii)) (Note: Roads to the West India Docks Act 1809 (49 Geo. 3. c. clxxii)) (Note: Roads communicating with the West India and East India Docks Act 1811 (51 Geo. 3. c. xlii)) (Note: Roads communicating with the West and East India Docks Act 1815 (55 Geo. 3. c. lxxxix)) and of His present Majesty, (Note: Tilbury Fort Road Act 1821 (1 & 2 Geo. 4. c. xxxiii)) for making and maintaining the Roads communicating with the West and East India Docks; and for repairing the Cannon Street Road; and for making and maintaining a new Road to Barking, and a Road from the Romford and Whitechapel Road to Tilbury Fort in the Counties of Middlesex and Essex; and also for making a new Branch of Road from King David Lane, Shadwell, to the Essex Road at Mile End in the County of Middlesex. (Repealed by Commercial and East India and Barking Roads Act 1828 (9 Geo. 4. c. cxii))
Vale of Blackmoor Turnpike Roads Act 1824	5 Geo. 4. c. cxlv	17 June 1824
An Act for repairing the Roads leading out of the Turnpike Road between Poole and Wimborne Minster into the Turnpike Road between Blandford Forum and Dorchester, and for repairing and improving the Roads from Durweston Bridge to Caundle Bishop, from Bagber Common to Holton Street, and from North Cheriton to Lattiford, all in the Counties of Dorset and Somerset.
Shepley and Cawthorne Turnpike Road (Yorkshire, West Riding) Act 1824 (repealed)	5 Geo. 4. c. cxlvi	17 June 1824
An Act for making and maintaining a Turnpike Road from Shepley Lane Head, in the Township of Shepley, to the Termination of a Branch of the Barnsley Turnpike Road, in the Township of Cawthorne, in the West Riding of the County of York. (Repealed by Shepley Lane Head and Darton Road (Yorkshire, West Riding) Act 1825 (6 Geo. 4. c. cliv))
City of London Coal Trade Act 1824 (repealed)	5 Geo. 4. c. cxlvii	21 June 1824
An Act to enable the Mayor and Commonalty and Citizens of the City of London to raise a Sum of Money at a reduced Rale of Interest, to pay off the Monies now charged bn the Duties payable by virtue of an Act made in the Forty third Year of the Reign of His late Majesty King George the Third, (Note: London Coal Trade Act 1803 (43 Geo. 3. c. cxxxiv)) for establishing a Free Market in the City of London for the Sale of Coals. (Repealed by Statute Law (Repeals) Act 2008 (c. 12))
Medway Lower Navigation Act 1824	5 Geo. 4. c. cxlviii	21 June 1824
An Act for the more effectually improving the Navigation of the River Medway from Maidstone to Halling in the County of Kent, and to alter and enlarge the Powers of an Act of the Forty second Year of His late Majesty, (Note: Medway Lower Navigation Act 1802 (42 Geo. 3. c. xciv)) for improving the Navigation of the said River.
Lanark and Glasgow Bridewell Act 1824	5 Geo. 4. c. cxlix	21 June 1824
An Act for amending an Act passed in the Third Year of the Reign of His present Majesty, (Note: Lanark and Glasgow Bridewell Act 1822 (3 Geo. 4. c. liv)) for erecting a Bridewell for the County of Lanark and City of Glasgow.
Haw Passage Severn Bridge Act 1824 (repealed)	5 Geo. 4. c. cl	21 June 1824
An Act to amend an Act of the Fourth Year of His present Majesty, (Note: Haw Passage (Gloucestershire) Severn Bridge and Roads Act 1823 (4 Geo. 4. c. i)) for building a Bridge over the River Severn, at or near the Haw Passage, in the County of Gloucester, and for making convenient Roads thereto; and to divert Part of the Line of Road by the said Act authorized to be made. (Repealed by Haw Bridge Act 1852 (15 & 16 Vict. c. lix))
Fleet Market Act 1824	5 Geo. 4. c. cli	21 June 1824
An Act for the Removal of Fleet Market in the City of London.
Londonderry Improvement Act 1824	5 Geo. 4. c. clii	21 June 1824
An Act to amend an Act of the Thirtieth Year of His late Majesty, (Note: Londonderry Bridge Act 1790 (30 Geo. 3. c. 31 (I))) for lighting and improving the City of Londonderry.
British Annuity Company Act 1824	5 Geo. 4. c. cliii	21 June 1824
An Act to enable the British Annuity Company for the purchasing of Annuities, under certain Regulations to sue and be sued in the Name of the Chairman or Secretary for the Time being.
Patriotic Assurance Company of Ireland Act 1824	5 Geo. 4. c. cliv	21 June 1824
An Act to enable the Patriotic Assurance Company of Ireland to sue and be sued in the Name of the Secretary, or of One of the Members of the said Company.
Southwark Bridge Approaches Act 1824	5 Geo. 4. c. clv	24 June 1824
An Act to amend the Acts relating to the Southwark Bridge.
Thames Tunnel Act 1824	5 Geo. 4. c. clvi	24 June 1824
An Act for making and maintaining a Tunnel under the River Thames, from some Place in the Parish of Saint John of Wapping in the County of Middlesex, to the opposite Shore of the said River in the Parish of Saint Mary Rotherhithe in the County of Surrey, with sufficient Approaches thereto.
Royal Irish Mining Company Act 1824	5 Geo. 4. c. clvii	24 June 1824
An Act to encourage the working of Mines in Ireland, and to regulate a Joint Stock Company for that Purpose, to be called "The Royal Irish Mining Company."
Mining Company of Ireland Act 1824	5 Geo. 4. c. clviii	24 June 1824
An Act to enable the Mining Company of Ireland to sue and be sued in the Name of their Secretary, or of One of the Members of the said Company.
Hibernian Joint Stock Company Act 1824	5 Geo. 4. c. clix	25 June 1824
An Act to enable the Hibernian Joint Stock Company, for the Purpose of purchasing and selling Annuities, and all public and other Securities Real and Personal in Ireland, and to advance Money, and make Loans thereof, on the Security of such Real and Personal Security, at legal Interest, and on the Security of Merchandize and manufactured Goods, to sue and be sued in the Name of the Governor or Secretary for the Time being.
St. Patrick Assurance Company Act 1824	5 Geo. 4. c. clx	25 June 1824
An Act to enable the Saint Patrick Assurance Company of Ireland to sue and be sued in the Name of their Secretary, or of One of the Members of the said Company.

=== Private acts ===
Short title	Citation	Royal assent
Long title
Snelston Inclosure Act 1824	5 Geo. 4. c. 1 Pr.	31 March 1824
An Act for inclosing Lands in the Parish of Snelston in the County of Derby.
Henry Thornhill's Estate Act 1824	5 Geo. 4. c. 2 Pr.	12 April 1824
An Act for enabling the Trustees under the Will of Henry Bache Thornhill Esquire, deceased, to sell the Manor of Pleasley in the County of Derby, with divers Estates within the Parish and Manor of Pleasley, and for applying the Monies to arise from the Sale thereof in the Purchase of other Estates in the County of Derby, to be settled to the subsisting Uses of the said Will.
Wenden Lofts Inclosure Act 1824	5 Geo. 4. c. 3 Pr.	12 April 1824
An Act for inclosing Lands in the Parishes of Wenden Lofts and Elmdon in the County of Essex, and for extinguishing the Tithes in the said Parishes.
Macclesfield Grammar School's Estate Act 1824	5 Geo. 4. c. 4 Pr.	17 May 1824
An Act to amend an Act made in the Fourteenth Year of the Reign of His late Majesty, (Note: Macclesfield Grammar School Act 1774 (14 Geo. 3. c. 51)) for confirming certain Sales and Purchases made by the Governors of the Possessions, Revenues and Goods of the Free Grammar School of King Edward the Sixth in Macclesfield in the County of Chester, and to enable them to grant Building Leases of certain of their Estates, and to improve and extend the Benefits of the Foundation of the said School, and for other Purposes therein mentioned.
Stone's Estate Act 1824	5 Geo. 4. c. 5 Pr.	17 May 1824
An Act for vesting the Freehold and Copyhold or Customary Estates of Inheritance, devised by the Will of Robert Stone Esquire, deceased, in Trustees for selling or leasing the same or any Part thereof, with the Approbation of the High Court of Chancery.
Long Crendon Inclosure Act 1824	5 Geo. 4. c. 6 Pr.	17 May 1824
An Act for inclosing Lands in the Parish of Long Crendon in the County of Buckingham.
Pamber and Inhurst Inclosure Act 1824	5 Geo. 4. c. 7 Pr.	17 May 1824
An Act for dividing, allotting and inclosing the Commons, Waste Lands and Commonable Woods, of and within the several Tithings of Pamber and Inhurst, in the respective Parishes of Pamber and Baughurst in the County of Southampton.
Leeds Tithes Act 1824	5 Geo. 4. c. 8 Pr.	28 May 1824
An Act for abolishing certain Vicarial Tithes and Easter Offerings, within the Parish of Leeds in the County of York; and for making Compensation in lieu thereof.
Ulceby Inclosure Act 1824	5 Geo. 4. c. 9 Pr.	28 May 1824
An Act for inclosing, draining and exonerating from Tithes, Lands in the Parish of Ulceby, in the Wapentake of Yarborough in the County of Lincoln.
Alton Inclosure Act 1824	5 Geo. 4. c. 10 Pr.	28 May 1824
An Act for inclosing Lands in the Manor and Parish of Alveton, otherwise Alton, and the Parish of Bradley in the Moors in the County of Stafford.
Brighthelmston Chapel Act 1824	5 Geo. 4. c. 11 Pr.	3 June 1824
An Act for building a Chapel in the Eastern Parts of the Town of Brighthelmston (Note: Brighthelmston is now known as Brighton.) in the County of Sussex.
Bincombe Inclosure Act 1824	5 Geo. 4. c. 12 Pr.	3 June 1824
An Act for dividing, allotting and inclosing certain Lands within the Parish of Bincombe in the County of Dorset.
Swanland Inclosure Act 1824	5 Geo. 4. c. 13 Pr.	3 June 1824
An Act for inclosing Lands in the Township of Ferriby, Swanland, Kirk Ella, West Ella and Willerby, in the Parishes of Ferriby and Kirk Ella in the County of the Town of Kingston upon Hull.
Sutton Coldfield Inclosure Act 1824	5 Geo. 4. c. 14 Pr.	3 June 1824
An Act for inclosing Lands within the Royal Town, Manor and Lordship of Sutton Coldfield, and the Parish of Sutton Coldfield, in the County of Warwick.
Aisgarth Inclosure Act 1824	5 Geo. 4. c. 15 Pr.	9 June 1824
An Act for inclosing Lands in the Township and Manor of High Abbotside, and in the Township of Looser Abbotside and Manor of Dalegrange, otherwise Lower Abbotside, in the Parish of Aisgarth, in the County of York.
Edmonstone's Estate Act 1824	5 Geo. 4. c. 16 Pr.	17 June 1824
An Act for empowering the Judges of the Court of Session in Scotland to sell such Parts of the Estates situated in the County of Stirling, which were entailed by Sir Archibald Edmonstone of Duntreath Baronet, deceased, as shall be sufficient for Payment of the Debts and Burdens affecting the same.
Earl of Galloway's Estate Act 1824	5 Geo. 4. c. 17 Pr.	17 June 1824
An Act for empowering the Judges of the Court of Session in Scotland to sell Parts of the entailed Estates of George Earl of Galloway, situated in the Shire of Wigton and Stewartry of Kircudbright, for Payment and Satisfaction of certain Debts incurred by the said Earl prior to the Eleventh Day of July One thousand eight hundred and twenty three.
Smith's Estate Act 1824	5 Geo. 4. c. 18 Pr.	17 June 1824
An Act for vesting certain Parts of the entailed Estates of Sir Thomas Smyth Baronet, situate in the County of Essex, in Trustees for Sale, and for investing the Proceeds thereof in the Purchase of Lands lying intermixed with other Estates in the said County, standing settled to the like Uses; and also for effectuating the Exchange of Part of such last mentioned Estates for certain Glebe Lands belonging to the United Rectories of Thoydon Mount and Stapelford Tawney in the said County; and for other Purposes.
Campbell's Estate Act 1824	5 Geo. 4. c. 19 Pr.	17 June 1824
An Act for vesting the Estates of Colin Campbell, late of Kilmartine in the County of Argyle, in Trustees, to be sold, and the Proceeds thereof to be applied in Payment of his Debts remaining due; and for laying out the Residue in the Purchase of other Lands, to be entailed in favour of the same Persons, and on the Conditions of the Deed of Entail executed by the said Colin Campbell.
Eccles Vicarage Estate Act 1824	5 Geo. 4. c. 20 Pr.	17 June 1824
An Act to enable the Vicar for the Time being of the Parish and Parish Church of Eccles in the County Palatine of Lancaster, to grant building Leases of the Glebe Lands belonging to the said Vicarage.
Macrae's Estate Act 1824	5 Geo. 4. c. 21 Pr.	17 June 1824
An Act to empower the Judges of the Court of Session in Scotland to sell such Parts of the entailed Estate of Holmains in the Sheriffdom of Dumfries, presently belonging to James Charles Macrae Esquire of Holmains, as may be necessary for discharging the Debts and Burdens affecting the said Estate.
Maxwell's Estate Act 1824	5 Geo. 4. c. 22 Pr.	17 June 1824
An Act for settling the Lands of Chilcarroch and others in the Sheriffdom of Wigton, to and in favour of Sir William Maxwell Baronet, and the Heirs entitled to take by a certain Deed of Entail by Sir William Maxwell Baronet, deceased, under the Conditions and Limitations in the said Deed, and for vesting in lieu thereof certain Parts of the entailed Estate of Drummodie in the said Sheriffdom, in certain Trustees nominated by the said Sir William Maxwell deceased, for the Purposes of the Trust; and for other Purposes therein mentioned.
Marquess of Anglesey's Estate Act 1824	5 Geo. 4. c. 23 Pr.	17 June 1824
An Act for uniting the Rectory of Clifton Maybank otherwise Clifton in the County of Dorset with the Vicarage of Bradford Abbas otherwise Bradford in the same County; and for an Exchange of Part of the Glebe Lands of the said Vicarage for Lands of the Most Honourable Henry William Marquees of Anglesey and the Right Honourable Henry Paget, commonly called Earl of Uxbridge, his eldest Son, in the same Parish; and for apportioning the Rectorial and Vicarial Tithes of the said Parish of Milborne Port; and for an Exchange between the Warden and Scholars, Clerks of Saint Mary College of Winchester near Winchester, and the said Marquess and Earl, of the Manor and Impropriate Rectory and Advowson of the Vicarage of Milborne Port in the County of Somerset, and divers Lands and Hereditaments in the Parish of Milborne Port, for the Manor of Sherborne Wyke, and divers Farms and Lands and Impropriate Tithes in the Parishes of Sherborne, Bradford Abbas, and Thornford, in the County of Dorset, and for the Advowsons of the said Rectory of Clifton Maybank and Vicarage of Bradford Abbas.
Lady Grosvenor's Estate Act 1824	5 Geo. 4. c. 24 Pr.	17 June 1824
An Act to enable the Right Honourable Eleanor Countess Grosvenor and the Person or Persons for the Time being entitled to the Estates devised by the Wills of the Right Honourable Thomas late Earl of Wilton, and the Right Honourable Eleanor late Countess of Wilton, both deceased, to make Conveyances in Fee or Demises for long Terms of Years, of certain Parts of the said Estates, for building on or improving the same, under reserved Yearly Rents.
Armitstead's Estate Act 1824	5 Geo. 4. c. 25 Pr.	17 June 1824
An Act for effecting an Exchange of the undivided Moiety of certain Estates in the Parish of Audley in the County of Stafford, settled by the Will of Catharine Tollet Widow, and now in the Possession of Lawrence Armitstead Esquire, for a certain other Estate in the County of Chester, belonging to the said Lawrence Armitstead, in Fee Simple, to be settled to the subsisting Uses of the said Will.
Morgan's Estate Act 1824	5 Geo. 4. c. 26 Pr.	17 June 1824
An Act to enable Sir Charles Morgan Baronet, with the Licence of Sir Charles Joshua Smith Baronet, or other the Person or Persons claiming under a Settlement made on his Marriage with Dame Belinda his Wife, late Belinda Colebrook, Spinster, to grant building Leases of certain Copyhold Lands held of the Manor of Stebbunheath otherwise Stepney, in the County of Middlesex, pursuant to Contracts entered into by the said Sir Charles Morgan; and to enable the said Sir Charles Joshua Smith, and other Persons claiming under the said Settlement, to licence the granting of Leases of other Copyhold Lands within the said Manor, for a longer Term of Years than authorized by the Custom of the said Manor.
Proctor's Estate Act 1824	5 Geo. 4. c. 27 Pr.	17 June 1824
An Act to give Powers of Sale over the Estates devised by the Will of Ambrose Proctor of Ware in the County of Hertford, Gentleman, deceased, for the Purpose of obtaining a more connected and convenient Estate, to be settled to the existing Uses of his Will; and of changing and appointing new Trustees for the Purposes of this Act.
Lancaster Tithes Act 1824	5 Geo. 4. c. 28 Pr.	17 June 1824
An Act to commute for a Corn Rent certain Tithes and Dues payable to the Vicar of the Parish of Lancaster in the County of Lancaster.
Llanfihangel Generglyn Inclosure Act 1824	5 Geo. 4. c. 29 Pr.	17 June 1824
An Act to amend an Act of His late Majesty King George the Third, (Note: Llanfihangel, &c. Inclosure Act 1813 (53 Geo. 3. c. 71 Pr.)) for inclosing Lands in the several Parishes of Llanvihangel Generglyn and Llanganfelin in the County of Cardigan.
Walmgate Bar Inclosure Act 1824	5 Geo. 4. c. 30 Pr.	17 June 1824
An Act for extinguishing the Rights of Stray and Average over certain Lands called Half Year Lands, situate without Walmgate Bar, in the Suburbs or Precincts of the City of York.
Castleisland Inclosure Act 1824	5 Geo. 4. c. 31 Pr.	17 June 1824
An Act for dividing, allotting and inclosing certain Lands and Waste Grounds, called the Town and Undivided Lands of Castle Island in the County of Kerry.
Potterne Inclosure Act 1824	5 Geo. 4. c. 32 Pr.	17 June 1824
An Act for dividing, allotting and laying in Severalty Lands in the Districts or Tithings of Potterne and Marston, within the Parish of Potterne, in the County of Wilts; and for vesting Part of the said Lands situate in Potterne in Trustees, for the Benefit of the Poor of that Part of the said Parish.
Viscount Bulkeley's Estate Act 1824	5 Geo. 4. c. 33 Pr.	21 June 1824
An Act to enable the Devisees under the Will of Thomas James Warren Lord Viscount Bulkeley, deceased, to grant building and repairing Leases of Parts of the devised Estates, and to establish and render valid and effectual a Term of Five hundred Years, limited or intended to have been limited by the said Will for the Purposes thereby intended.
Ormonde's Estate Act 1824	5 Geo. 4. c. 34 Pr.	21 June 1824
An Act for enabling certain Estates in England of the Most Honourable Walter late Marquis of Ormonde, deceased, to be sold, and the Proceeds arising therefrom, after Payment of certain Charges and Incumbrances, to be applied in Reduction of the Charges and Incumbrances affecting the Family and other Estates in Ireland, late of the said Marquis of Ormonde; and for enabling the said last mentioned Estates to be settled, subject to the unliquidated Charges and Incumbrances thereon, to the subsisting Uses and Powers of the Estates in England sold under the Authority of this Act, and with additional Provisions to be inserted in such Settlement.
Sir John Frederick's, &c. Estate Act 1824	5 Geo. 4. c. 35 Pr.	21 June 1824
An Act to carry into complete Effect certain Articles of Agreement made and entered into between John Lord Bishop of London, since deceased, Sir John Frederick Baronet, Arthur Stanhope Esquire, Sir Frederick Treise Morshead Baronet, Sir John Morshead Baronet, since deceased, and Dame Elizabeth his Wife, and Selina Thistlethayte, since deceased, and the Company of Proprietors of the Grand Junction Canal.
Cooke's Estate Act 1824	5 Geo. 4. c. 36 Pr.	21 June 1824
An Act for vesting the Manor of Keymer in the County of Sussex, and certain other Freehold and Copyhold Estates devised by the Will of James Cooke Esquire, deceased, in Trustees, to be sold; and for authorizing the Enfranchisement of Copyhold Estates holden of the said Manor; for the Payment of Debts and Incumbrances; and for laying out Part of the Purchase Monies in the Purchase of other Estates, to be settled in lieu of the settled Moiety of the said Manor and other Hereditaments, and to the same Uses as that Moiety is settled.
See of Canterbury Estates Act 1824	5 Geo. 4. c. 37 Pr.	21 June 1824
An Act for extending to other Estates belonging to the See of Canterbury the Powers of an Act passed in the Forty seventh Year of the Reign of His Majesty King George the Third, (Note: See of Canterbury's Estate Act 1807 (47 Geo. 3 Sess. 2. c. cxxviii)) and of an Act passed in the First Year of the Reign of His present Majesty, (Note: See of Canterbury's Estates Act 1820 (1 Geo. 4. c. 48 Pr.)) for enabling the Archbishop of Canterbury to grant Building Leases and Repairing Leases.
Etwall Hospital and Repton Free School Act 1824	5 Geo. 4. c. 38 Pr.	21 June 1824
An Act to empower the Governors and Corporation of Etwall Hospital and Repton Free School in the County of Derby, to extend and increase the Objects of that Charity, and to make Sales, and for other Purposes therein mentioned.
Nathaniel Wright's Estate Act 1824	5 Geo. 4. c. 39 Pr.	21 June 1824
An Act for vesting certain Estates in the Counties of Leicester and Chester, devised by the Will of Nathaniel Wright Esquire, deceased, in Trustees, to be sold; and for authorizing the Purchase of other Estates to be settled to the same Uses.
Kent Life Assurance and Annuity Institution or Company Act 1824	5 Geo. 4. c. 40 Pr.	21 June 1824
An Act for dissolving a certain Partnership called "The Kent Life Assurance and Annuity Institution or Company;" and for satisfying the Engagements entered into on Behalf of the same Institution, and dividing the Surplus of the Capital belonging to the same Institution amongst the Holders of Shares of the same Capital.
Chindley Inclosure Act 1824 (Note: This act was not printed by the King's Printer.)	5 Geo. 4. c. 41 Pr.	16 March 1824
An Act for dividing, allotting and inclosing certain uninclosed Lands in the Hamlet or Village of Chindley in the Parish of Glossop in the County of Derby.
Camerton Inclosure Act 1824	5 Geo. 4. c. 42 Pr.	31 March 1824
An Act for inclosing Lands within the Manor of Camerton in the County of Cumberland.
Tarrant Hinton Inclosure Act 1824	5 Geo. 4. c. 43 Pr.	15 April 1824
An Act for inclosing Lands in the Parish of Tarrant Hinton in the County of Dorset.
West Drayton Inclosure Act 1824	5 Geo. 4. c. 44 Pr.	28 May 1824
An Act for inclosing and exonerating from Tithes, Lands within the Parish of West Drayton in the County of Middlesex,
Sturminster Newton Castle Inclosure Act 1824	5 Geo. 4. c. 45 Pr.	3 June 1824
An Act for inclosing the Commons and Waste Lands in the Parish of Sturminster Newton Castle in the County of Dorset.
Viscount Stafford's Reversal of Attainder Act 1824	5 Geo. 4. c. 46 Pr.	17 June 1824
An Act for reversing the Attainder of William late Viscount Stafford.
Earl of Mar's Dignity Act 1824	5 Geo. 4. c. 47 Pr.	17 June 1824
An Act for the Restoration of John Francis Erskine of Mar, to the Dignity and Title of Earl of Mar.
Viscount Strathallan's Dignity Act 1824	5 Geo. 4. c. 48 Pr.	17 June 1824
An Act for the Restoration of James Drummond Esquire, to the Dignity and Title of Viscount of Strathallan.
Viscount Kenmure's Dignity Act 1824	5 Geo. 4. c. 49 Pr.	17 June 1824
An Act for the Restoration of John Gordon Esquire, of Kenmure, to the Dignity and Title of Viscount Kenmure.
Lord Nairn's Dignity Act 1824	5 Geo. 4. c. 50 Pr.	17 June 1824
An Act for the Restoration of William Naime Esquire, to the Dignity and Title of Lord Nairn.
Howle Inclosure Act 1824	5 Geo. 4. c. 51 Pr.	17 June 1824
An Act for confirming the Inclosure of certain Lands in the Manor of Howle in the County of Salop, so far as relates to certain Allotments made to John Jellicorse Esquire, deceased, and other Lands purchased by him and William Jellicorse Esquire, bis Son.
Siller's Naturalization Act 1824	5 Geo. 4. c. 52 Pr.	17 June 1824
An Act for naturalizing John Peter Christian Siller.
Wilson's Divorce Act 1824	5 Geo. 4. c. 53 Pr.	21 June 1824
An Act to dissolve the Marriage of Robert Scott Wilson, a Captain in the East India Company's Military Service, with Clarissa Phillipina his now Wife, and to enable him to many again; and for other Purposes therein mentioned.

=== Sources ===
- The Statutes of the United Kingdom of Great Britain and Ireland. Vol. 64: 5 George IV. London: Joseph Butterworth. 1824 – via Internet Archive.
- The Statutes of the United Kingdom of Great Britain and Ireland. Vol. 64: 5 George IV. London: Joseph Butterworth. 1824 – via Google Books.
- Journal of the House of Commons. Vol. 79. London: His Majesty's Stationery Office. pp. 3–539 – via Google Books.

== See also ==
- List of acts of the Parliament of the United Kingdom
