= Combinations of Workmen Act 1825 =

Act of the Parliament of the United Kingdom

- Act of Parliament
- Parliament of the United Kingdom
- Long title: An act to repeal the Laws relating to the Combination of Workmen, and to make other Provisions in lieu thereof.
- Citation: 6 Geo. 4. c. 129
- Territorial extent: United Kingdom

Dates
- Royal assent: 6 July 1825
- Commencement: 6 July 1825 (Note: The Acts of Parliament (Commencement) Act 1793.)
- Repealed: 29 June 1871
Other legislation
Amends	See § Repealed enactments
Repeals/revokes	See § Repealed enactments
Repealed by	Criminal Law Amendment Act 1871
Relates to	Combination Act 1799; Trade Union Act 1871

Status: Repealed

Text of statute as originally enacted

The Combinations of Workmen Act 1825 (6 Geo. 4. c. 129) was an act of the Parliament of the United Kingdom. The act prohibited combinations of workers for purposes other than negotiating wages and working hours, while continuing to criminalise many forms of industrial action such as picketing, intimidation, and coercion. It did not completely ban trade unions or all collective bargaining.

== Background ==
The act followed on from the Combination Act 1799 (39 Geo. 3. c. 81) and the Combination of Workmen Act 1824 (5 Geo. 4. c. 95). The 1824 act repealed the acts of 1799 and 1800, but this led to a wave of strikes. Accordingly, the Combinations of Workmen Act 1825 was passed to reimpose criminal sanctions for picketing and other methods of persuading workers not to work.

== Provisions ==
This law made illegal any combinations not for the purposes of pressing for wage increases or for a change in working hours. Nonetheless, it represented a step forward for the labour movement, inasmuch as it recognised the right of trade unions to engage in collective bargaining, then illegal across much of the Continent.

=== Repealed enactments ===
Section 1 of the act repealed the Combination of Workmen Act 1824 (5 Geo. 4. c. 95).

Section 2 of the act repealed 35 enactments, listed in that section, as well as all acts relative to combinations of workmen or of masters as to wages, time of working, quantity of work, etc.

Citation	Short title	Description	Extent of repeal
33 Edw. St. 1	Statutum de Conspiratoribus	A certain Act passed in the Thirty third Year of King Edward the First, intituled Who be Conspirators and who be Champertors.	As relates to Combinations or Conspiracies of Workmen or other Persons to obtain an Advance or to fix the Rate of Wages, or to lessen or alter the Hours or Duration of the Time of work- ing, or to decrease the Quantity of Work, or to regulate or controul the Mode of carrying on any Manufacture, Trade or Business, or the Management thereof, and as relates to Combinations or Conspiracies of Masters, Manufacturers or other Persons, to lower or fix the Rate of Wages, or to increase or alter the Hours or Duration of the Time of working, or to increase the Quantity of Work, or to regulate or controul the Mode of carrying on any Manufacture, Trade or Business, or the Management thereof, or to oblige Workmen to enter into Work.
3 Hen. 6. c. 1	Labourers Act 1425	A certain other Act passed in the Third Year of King Henry the Sixth intituled Masons shall not confederate themselves in Chapiters and Assemblies.	The whole act.
33 Hen. 8. c. 9 (I)	Servants' Wages Act 1542	A certain other Act passed in the Parliament of Ireland, in the Thirty third Year of King Henry the Eighth, intituled An Act for Servants' Wages.	The whole act.
2 & 3 Edw. 6. c. 15	Victuallers, etc. Act 1548	A certain other Act passed in the Second and Third Years of King Edward the Sixth, intituled The Bill of Conspiracies of Victuallers and Craftsmen.	The whole act.
5 Parl. Jac. 1. (S.)	Craftsmen's Work Act 1426	A certain other Act passed in the Parliament of Scotland, in the Fifth Parliament of King James the First of Scotland, intituled of the Fees of Craftsmen and the Price of their Worke.	The whole act.
5 Parl. Jac. 1. (S.)	Wages Act 1426	A certain other Act passed in the Parliament of Scotland, in the Fifth Parliament of King James the First of Scotland, intituled Of the Fees of Workmen.	The whole act.
5 Parl. Jac. 1. (S.)	N/A	A certain other Act passed in the Parliament of Scotland, in the Fifth Parliament of King James the First of Scotland, intituled Of Writches and Masones.	The whole act.
7 Parl. Jac. 1. (S.)	N/A	A certain other Act passed in the Parliament of Scotland, in the Seventh Parliament of King James the First of Scotland, intituled The Price of Silk Workmanshippe.	The whole act.
5 Parl. Mar. (S.)	Craftsmen Act 1551	A certain other Act, passed in the Parliament of Scotland, in the Fifth Parliament of Queen Mary of Scotland, intituled The Price of Craftesmenne's Wark, of Meate and Drinke in Tavernes.	The whole act.
7 Parl. Jac. 6. (S.)	Regulation of Prices Act 1581	A certain other Act passed in the Parliament of Scotland, in the Seventh Parliament of King James the Sixth of Scotland, intituled Anent the setting of Ordour and Price in all Stuiffe.	The whole act.
13 & 14 Cha. 2. c. 15	Silk Throwing Act 1662	A certain other Act passed in the Thirteenth and Fourteenth Years of King Charles the Second, intituled An Act for regulating the Trade of Silk Throwing.	As provides and enacts, that the Corporation of Silk Throwers should not, by virtue of that Act, nor any Thing therein contained, make any Orders, Ordinances or Bye Laws, to set any Rates or Prices whatsoever upon the throwing of Silk, to bind or enforce their Members to work at. I.e., section 10.
7 Geo. 1. St. 1. c. 13	Journeymen Tailors, London Act 1720	A certain other Act passed in the Seventh Year of King George the First, intituled An Act for regulating the Journeymen Tailors within the Weekly Bills of Mortality.	Excepting so much thereof as relates to the Recovery of Wages, or to Journeymen Tailors or Servants departing from their Service, or refusing to enter into Work or Employment, as therein mentioned. I.e., sections 4 and 6.
12 Geo. 1. c. 34	Woollen Manufactures Act 1725	An Act passed in the Twelfth Year of King George the First, intituled An Act to prevent unlawful Combinations of Workmen employed in the Woollen Manufactures, and for better Payment of their Wages.	As provides that Contracts, Covenants or Agreements, Bye Laws, Ordinances, Rules and Orders, made or entered into by or between Persons brought up in, or professing, using or exercising the Art and Mystery of a Woolcomber or Weaver, or Journeyman Woolcomber or Journeyman Weaver, as therein mentioned, shall be illegal, null and void, and as punishes Woolcombers, Weavers, Journeyman Woolcombers and Weavers, and other Persons concerned in the Woollen Manufactures, for keeping up, continuing, acting in, making, entering into, signing, sealing or being knowingly concerned in, presuming or attempting to put in Execution such Agreements, Bye Laws, Ordinances, Rules or Orders, as therein mentioned, and as provides that the Provisions of the said Act of the Twelfth of George the First, just recited, shall extend to the Persons therein mentioned. I.e., sections 1 and 8.
3 Geo. 2. c. 14 (I)	N/A	A certain other Act passed in the Parliament of Ireland, in the Third Year of King George the Second, intituled An Act to prevent unlawful Combinations of Workmen, Artificers and Labourers, employed in the several Trades and Manufactures of this Kingdom, and for the better Payment of their Wages; as also to prevent Abuses in making of Bricks, and to ascertain their Dimensions.	As declares illegal, null and void the Contracts, Covenants, Agreements, Bye Laws, Ordinances, Rules and Orders therein mentioned, and makes it an Offence to keep up, continue, act in, make, enter into, sign, seal or to be knowingly concerned therein, and to presume or attempt to put the same into Execution, as therein mentioned.
17 Geo. 2. c. 8 (I) (Note: Incorrectly cited as "17 G. 2. c. 28. (I.) in part.")	Truck Act 1743	A certain other Act passed in the Parliament of Ireland, in the Seventeenth Year of King George the Second, intituled An Act for continuing several Statutes now near expiring, and for amending other Statutes, and for other Purposes therein mentioned.	As declares the Assemblies therein mentioned to be unlawful Assemblies, the Houses where they meet common Nuisances, and punishes the Master and Mistress thereof, as likewise those who enter into the Contracts, Covenants or Articles therein mentioned, or collect or pay Money for the Support of Persons as therein mentioned.
22 Geo. 2. c. 27	Frauds by Workmen Act 1748	A certain other Act passed in the Twenty second Year of King George the Second, intituled An Act for the more effectual preventing of Frauds and Abuses committed by Persons employed in the Manufacture of Hats, and in the Woollen, Linen, Fustian, Cotton, Iron, Leather, Fur, Hemp, Flax, Mohair and Silk Manufactures, and for preventing unlawful Combinations of Journeymen Dyers and Journeymen Hotpressers, and of all Persons employed in the said several Manufactures, and for the better Payment of their Wages.	As extends those Provisions of the said Act of the Twelfth of George the First herein mentioned to the Persons therein mentioned. I.e., section 12.
29 Geo. 2. c. 33	Woollen Manufacture Act 1756	A certain other Act passed in the Twenty ninth Year of King George the Second, intituled An Act to render more effectual an Act passed in the Twelfth Year of the Reign of His late Majesty King George, to prevent unlawful Combinations of Workmen employed in the Woollen Manufactures, and for better Payment of their Wages; and also an Act passed in the Thirteenth Year of the Reign of His said late Majesty, for the better Regulation of the Woollen Manufacture, and for preventing Disputes among the Persons concerned therein, and for limiting a Time for Prosecution for the Forfeiture appointed by the aforesaid Act, in case of the Payment of the Workmen's Wages in any other Manner than in Money.	As relates to the making of Rates for the Payment of Wages, continuing and altering and notifying them as therein mentioned. I.e., section 1.
3 Geo. 3. c. 17 (I)	N/A	A certain other Act passed in the Parliament of Ireland, in the Third Year of King George the Third, intituled An Act for continuing and amending certain temporary Statutes heretofore made, for the better Regulation of the City of Cork, and for enlarging the Salary of the Treasurer, and for the better regulating the Sale of Coals in the said City, and for erecting and continuing Lamps in the same, and for the better preserving the Streets and Highways therein, and for confirming and establishing a Court of Conscience in the said City, and for regulating the Assize of Bread therein, and for securing the Quays by Parapet Walls.	As relates to the Assemblies and Combinations of Artificers, Journeymen, Apprentices, Labourers and Manufacturers therein mentioned.
3 Geo. 3. c. 34 (I)	Linen Manufacturers Act 1763	A certain other Act passed in the Parliament of Ireland, in the Third Year of King George the Third, intituled An Act for the better Regulation of the Linen and Hempen Manufactures.	As relates to meeting in order to consult upon or enter into Rules, Agreements or Combinations to ascertain or fix the Price of Labour or Workmanship, and as relates to administering Oaths or Declarations tending to fix the Price of Wages or Workmanship, and as relates to issuing and delivering Tickets, Certificates and Tokens of Parties being licensed to work, and as relates to Rules, Orders and Regulations relating to the Price or Wages of Labour or Workmanship, and as relates to Oaths to enter into Combinations or Agreements to ascertain or fix the Price of Wages or Workmanship, and to Oaths and Combinations not to work for a particular Employer, as therein mentioned.
8 Geo. 3. c. 17	Journeymen Tailors (London) Act 1768	A certain other Act, passed in the Eighth Year of King George the Third, intituled An Act to amend an Act made in the Seventh Year of King George the First, intituled ' An Act for regulating the Journeymen Tailors within the Weekly Bills of Mortality.	The whole act.
11 & 12 Geo. 3. c. 18 (I)	City of Cork Act 1771	A certain other Act, passed in the Parliament of Ireland in the Eleventh and Twelfth Years of King George the Third, intituled An Act for the Regulation of the City of Cork, and for other Purposes therein mentioned relative to the said City.	As relates to the Meetings and Assemblies therein mentioned, the administering and taking Oaths and Declarations, to the Tickets, Certificates, Advertisements and Writings, and to the Rules, Orders, Agreements and Regulations, and to the Combinations and Agreements to ascertain or fix the Price of Wages, Labour or Workmanship, or not to work, and as relates to the Refusal or Neglect, by Persons not in actual Service, to work on Application made, and as relates to the Detection and Discovery of Assemblies and Combinations for any of the above recited Purposes, and as relates to ascertaining Wages as therein mentioned.
11 & 12 Geo. 3. c. 33 (I)	N/A	A certain other Act, passed in the Parliament of Ireland in the Eleventh and Twelfth Years of King George the Third, intituled An Act for regulating the Journeymen Tailors and Journeymen Shipwrights of the City of Dublin and the Liberties thereof, and of the County of Dublin.	As punishes those who permit the Clubs and Societies therein mentioned to be kept or held in their Houses or Apartments, and as makes the Contracts, Covenants and Agreements therein mentioned, and Oaths to enforce them, illegal, and as punishes Persons for keeping up, continuing, acting in, making, entering into, signing, sealing or being knowingly interested or concerned in such Contracts, Covenants or Agreements, and as punishes Persons not retained or employed for refusing to enter into Work or Employment on Request made, as therein mentioned, and as regulates the Hours of Work and the Rate of Wages as therein mentioned.
13 Geo. 3. c. 68	Silk Manufactures Act 1772	A certain other Act, passed in the Thirteenth Year of King George the Third, intituled An Act to empower the Magistrates therein mentioned to settle and regulate the Wages of Persons employed in the Silk Manufacture within their respective Jurisdictions.	As relates to settling, regulating, ordering and declaring the Wages and Prices of Work, and the Notification thereof, and makes it an Offence to deviate from such Settlement, Regulation, Order and Declaration, or to ask, receive or take more or less Wages or larger or less Prices than shall be so settled, or to enter into Combinations, or for that Purpose to decoy or solicit, or to assemble, as therein mentioned, and as relates to the Detection of such Offences, and as makes it an Offence to retain or employ Journeymen Weavers, or to give, allow or pay, or cause to be given, allowed or paid, more or less Wages than shall be settled, as therein mentioned. (Note: This act was already repealed by the Silk Manufactures Act 1824 (5 Geo. 4. c. 66).) I.e., sections 1 to 3.
17 Geo. 3. c. 55	Manufacture of Hats Act 1776	A certain other Act, passed in the Seventeenth Year of King George the Third, intituled An Act for the better regulating the Hat Manufactory.	As relates to the keeping up, acting in, making, entering into, signing, sealing or being knowingly concerned in the Contracts, Covenants or Agreements, Bye Laws, Ordinances, Rules or Orders of the Clubs, Societies or Combinations therein mentioned, or the presuming or attempting to put the Agreements, Bye Laws, Ordinances, Rules or Orders in Execution, or to the attending Meetings, Clubs, Societies or Combinations, or to the Summoning, giving Notice to or calling upon, collecting, demanding or receiving, persuading, enticing or inveigling, or endeavouring to persuade, entice or inveigle, paying Money, making or entering into Subscriptions or Contributions, as therein mentioned. I.e., sections 3 and 4.
19 & 20 Geo. 3. c. 19 (I)	Obstruction of Trade Act 1779	A certain other Act, passed in the Parliament of Ireland in the Nineteenth and Twentieth Years of King George the Third, intituled An Act to prevent Combinations, and for the further Encouragement of Trade.	As declares that Combinations in Trade are public Nuisances, and that the Acts therein enumerated shall be considered as Evidences of unlawful Combinations, and sufficient for the Conviction of any Person who shall be guilty of the same, and as avoids Rules, Bye Laws and Regulations contrary to its Provisions and Oaths for obeying or executing the same, and as provides for the Case of an Act of Combination for which no specific Punishment is pointed out, as therein mentioned.
19 & 20 Geo. 3. c. 24 (I)	Silk Manufacture Act 1779	A certain other Act, passed in the Parliament of Ireland in the Nineteenth and Twentieth Years of King George the Third, intituled An Act for the better Regulation of the Silk Manufacture.	As relates to the Wages and Prices for Work, to Combinations to raise Wages, and the decoying or soliciting Journeymen Weavers, as therein mentioned.
19 & 20 Geo. 3. c. 36 (I)	N/A	A certain other Act, passed in the Parliament of Ireland in the Nineteenth and Twentieth Years of King George the Third, intituled An Act for regulating the curing and preparing Provisions, and for preventing Combinations among the several Tradesmen and other Persons employed in making up such Provisions, and for regulating the Butter Trade in the City of Dublin, and for other Purposes therein mentioned.	As relates to summoning Persons to appear at Meetings and Assemblies, and as relates to administering Oaths or Declarations, to the issuing and delivering of Messages, Tickets, Certificates and Tokens, Advertisements or Writings, to making or joining in making Rules, Orders, Agreements and Regulations as therein mentioned, and as relates to taking Oaths, or entering into Combinations or Agreements to ascertain or fix the Price of Wages or of Labour or Workmanship, or to make any Rule, Order, Agreement or Regulation, and to taking Oaths and entering into Combinations and Agreements not to work for a particular Person, as therein mentioned, and as relates to the fixing of Wages.
25 Geo. 3. c. 48 (I)	N/A	A certain other Act, passed in the Parliament of Ireland in the Twenty fifth Year of King George the Third intituled An Act for granting the Sums of Twenty thousand Pounds, Five thousand Pounds, and Four thousand Pounds, to certain Trustees, and for promoting the several Manufactures therein named.	As relates to ascertaining the Rates of Labour and Prices of Workmanship, as therein mentioned, and as requires an Affidavit to be filed previous to the Commencement of a Suit, as therein mentioned.
32 Geo. 3. c. 44	Silk Manufacture Act 1792	A certain other Act, passed in the Thirty second Year of King George the Third, intituled An Act for extending the Provisions of an Act made in the Thirteenth Year of the Reign of His present Majesty, intituled ' An Act to empower 6' the Magistrates therein mentioned to settle and regulate the Wages of Persons employed in the Silk Manufacture within their respective Jurisdictions,' to Manufactories of Silk mixed with other Materials, and for the more effectual Punishment of Buyers and Receivers of Silk purloined and embezzled by Persons employed in the Manufacture thereof.	As extend the Provisions of the said Act of the Thirteenth of George the Third, hereby repealed, to the Persons therein mentioned. (Note: This act was already repealed by the Silk Manufactures Act 1824 (5 Geo. 4. c. 66).) I.e., section 1.
36 Geo. 3. c. 111	Combination of Workmen Act 1796	A certain other Act, passed in the Thirty sixth Year of King George the Third, intituled An Act to prevent unlawful Combinations of Workmen employed in the Paper Manufactory.	The whole act.
39 Geo. 3. c. 56	Colliers (Scotland) Act 1799	A certain other Act passed in the Thirty ninth Year of King George the Third, intituled An Act to explain and amend the Laws relative to Colliers in that Part of Great Britain called Scotland.	As relates to the fixing and appointing of Hire and Wages. I.e., section 2.
39 & 40 Geo. 3. c. 106	Unlawful Combinations of Workmen Act 1800	An Act passed in the Thirty ninth and Fortieth Years of King George the Third, intituled An except Act to repeal an Act passed in the last Session of Parliament, intituled 'An Act to prevent unlawful Combinations of Workmen,' and to substitute other Provisions in lieu thereof.	Excepting so much thereof as relates to the Adjustment of Disputes between Masters and Workmen, as therein mentioned. (Note: This act was wholly repealed by section 1 of the Masters and Workmen Arbitration Act 1824 (5 Geo. 3. c. 96).) I.e., except sections 18 to 22.
43 Geo. 3. c. 86	Unlawful Combinations (Ireland) Act 1803	A certain other Act passed in the Forty third Year of King George the Third, intituled An Act to prevent unlawful Combinations of Workmen, Artificers, Journeymen and Labourers, in Ireland, and for other Purposes relating thereto	As makes illegal and void Contracts, Covenants and Agreements for obtaining an Advance of Wages, or for lessening or altering the Hours or Time of work ing, or for decreasing the Quantity of Work, or for controlling or affecting the Conduct or Management of any Manufacture, Trade or Business, and as prohibits the making or entering into or being concerned in the same, and as punishes Persons for so doing, and as relates to the Combinations therein mentioned, and as relates to endeavouring by Gift, Persuasion or Solicitation to prevent Persons hiring themselves, and as relates to attending the Meetings therein mentioned, or endeavouring to induce the Attendance of others, and collecting, demanding, asking or receiving Money for the Purposes therein mentioned, and as relates to persuading, enticing, soliciting or endeavouring to induce others to enter into or be concerned in the Combinations therein mentioned, and to paying Money, making or entering into Subscriptions or Contributions, and to Oaths and Declarations, and to Tickets, Certificates and Tokens, and to Contributions supporting and maintaining others, as therein mentioned, and as punishes Persons for permitting Assemblies in their Houses or Apartments, as therein mentioned. I.e., sections 1 to 4 and 10.
47 Geo. 3 Sess. 1. c. 43	Servants' Wages (Ireland) Act 1807	A certain other Act passed in the Forty seventh Year of King George the Third, intituled An Act to declare that the Provisions of an Act, made in the Parliament of Ireland in the Thirty third Year of King Henry the Eighth, relating to Servants Wages, shall extend to all Counties of Cities and Counties of Towns in Ireland.	The whole act.
57 Geo. 3. c. 122	Payment of Colliers' Wages Act 1817	A certain other Act passed in the Fifty seventh Year of King George the Third, intituled An Act to extend the Provisions of an Act of the Twelfth Year of His late Majesty King George the First, and an Act of the Twenty second Year of His late Majesty King George the Second, against Payment of Labourers in Goods or by Truck, and to secure their Payment in the lawful Money of this Realm, to Labourers employed in the Collieries, or in the working and getting of Coal, in the United Kingdom of Great Britain and Ireland, and for extending the Provisions of the said Acts to Scotland and Ireland.	As did extend to Scotland and Ireland any of the Provisions of the Acts intended to be repealed by the said recited Act of the last Session of Parliament.. I.e., section 4.

== Repeal ==
The act was recommended for amendment by the majority report of the Eleventh and Final Report of the Royal Commissioners appointed to Inquire into the Organisation and Rules of Trade Unions and Other Associations in 1869. It was wholly displaced by the Trade Union Act 1871 (34 & 35 Vict. c. 31).

The whole act was repealed by section 7 of, and the schedule to, the Criminal Law Amendment Act 1871 (34 & 35 Vict. c. 32), which came into force on 29 June 1871.

== See also ==
- UK labour law
- Le Chapelier Law 1791 in France sought to do the same
- The Making of the English Working Class by E. P. Thompson
