= Masters and Workmen Arbitration Act 1824 =

Act of the Parliament of the United Kingdom

Masters and Workmen Arbitration Act 1824 (Note: The citation of this act by this short title was authorised by section 1 of, and the first schedule to, the Short Titles Act 1896. Due to the repeal of those provisions it is now authorised by section 19(2) of the Interpretation Act 1978.)
- Act of Parliament
- Parliament of the United Kingdom
- Long title: An Act to consolidate and amend the Laws relative to the Arbitration of Disputes between Masters and Workmen.
- Citation: 5 Geo. 4. c. 96
- Introduced by: Joseph Hume MP (Commons)
- Territorial extent: United Kingdom

Dates
- Royal assent: 21 June 1824
- Commencement: 21 June 1824 (Note: The Acts of Parliament (Commencement) Act 1793.)
- Repealed: 7 August 1896
Other legislation
Amends	See § Repealed enactments
Repeals/revokes	See § Repealed enactments
Amended by	Master and Workmen (Arbitration) Act 1837; Public Authorities Protection Act 1893
Repealed by	Conciliation Act 1896
Relates to	Combination of Workmen Act 1824; Bankruptcy (England) Act 1824; Combinations of Workmen Act 1825

Status: Repealed

Text of statute as originally enacted

The Masters and Workmen Arbitration Act 1824 (5 Geo. 4. c. 96) was an act of the Parliament of the United Kingdom that consolidated and amended enactments relating to united Kingdom labour law.

== Passage ==
Leave to bring in the Masters and Workmen Bill to the House of Commons was granted on 24 May 1824 to Joseph Hume, William Sturges Bourne and Peter Moore. The bill had its first reading in the House of Commons on 28 May 1824, presented by Joseph Hume. The bill had its second reading in the House of Commons on 31 May 1824 and was committed to a committee of the whole house, which met on and reported on 31 May 1824, with amendments. The amended bill was considered and re-committed to a committee of the whole house which met and reported on 4 June 1824, with amendments. The amended bill had its third reading in the House of Commons on 5 June 1824 and passed, without amendments.

The bill, referred to as the Arbitration Laws Bill, had its first reading in the House of Lords on 9 June 1824. The bill had its second reading in the House of Lords on 15 June 1824 and was committed to a committee of the whole house, which met and reported on 17 June 1824, with amendments. The amended bill had its third reading in the House of Lords on 18 June 1824, without amendments.

The amended bill was considered and agreed to by the House of Commons on 19 June 1824.

The bill was granted royal assent on 21 June 1824.

== Provisions ==
=== Repealed enactments ===
Section 1 of the act repealed 7 enactments, listed in that section.

Citation	Short title	Description	Extent of repeal
3 Geo. 2. c. 14 (I)	N/A	A certain Act passed in the Parliament of Great Britain in the Eighth Year of King George the Second, intituled An Act to prevent unlawful Combinations of Workmen, Artificers and Labourers employed in the several Trades and Manufactures of this Kingdom, and for the better Payment of their Wages; as also to prevent Abuses in the making of Bricks, and to ascertain their Dimensions.	As relates to the erection of District or several jurisdictions, or relates to Brickmakers.
39 & 40 Geo. 3. c. 90	Disputes Between Masters and Workmen Act 1800	A certain act passed in the Thirty ninth and fortieth Years of King George the Third, intituled An Act for settling Disputes that may arise between Masters and Workmen engaged in the Manufacture of Goods in that Part of Great Britain called England.	The whole act.
39 & 40 Geo. 3. c. 106	Unlawful Combinations of Workmen Act 1800	A certain other Act passed in the Thirty ninth and Fortieth Years of King George the Third, intituled An Act to repeal an Act passed in the last Session of Parliament, intituled 'An Act to prevent unlawful Combinations of Workmen,' and to substitute other Provisions in lieu thereof.	The whole act.
41 Geo. 3. (U.K.). c. 38	Combinations of Workmen Act 1801	A certain other Act passed in the Forty first Year of King George the Third, intituled An Act to amend so much of an Act passed in the Thirty ninth and Fortieth Years of the Reign of His present Majesty, intituled 'An Act to repeal an Act passed in the last Session of Parliament, intituled 'An Act to prevent unlawful Combinations of Workmen,' and to substitute other Provisions in lieu thereof,' as relates to the Forms of various therein referred to.	The whole act.
43 Geo. 3. c. 151	Cotton Manufacture (Scotland) Act 1803	A certain other Act passed in the Forty third Year of King George the Third, intituled An Act for settling Disputes that may arise between Masters and Weavers engaged in the Cotton Manufactures in Scotland, and between Masters and Persons employed by them in such Manufactures in ornamenting Cotton Goods by the Needle.	The whole act.
44 Geo. 3. c. 87	Masters and Workmen Act 1804	A certain other Act passed in the Forty fourth Year of King George the Third, intituled An Act to amend an Act passed in the Thirty ninth and Fortieth Years of His present Majesty, intituled 'An Act for settling Disputes that may arise between Masters and Workmen engaged in the Cotton Manufactures in that Part of Great Britain called England'.	The whole act.
53 Geo. 3. c. 75	Cotton Trade (Ireland) Act 1813	A certain other Act passed in the Fortieth Year of King George the Third, intituled An Act for the better Regulation of the Cotton Trade in Ireland.	The whole act.

== Subsequent developments ==
Sections 33 and 34 of the act were repealed by section 2 of, and the schedule to, the Public Authorities Protection Act 1893 (56 & 57 Vict. c. 61), which came into force on 1 January 1894.

The whole act was repealed by section 7 of the Conciliation Act 1896 (59 & 60 Vict. c. 30), which came into force on 7 August 1896.
