= Combination Act 1799 =

Act of the Parliament of Great Britain

- Act of Parliament
- Parliament of Great Britain
- Long title: An Act to prevent Unlawful Combinations of Workmen.
- Citation: 39 Geo. 3. c. 81
- Territorial extent: Great Britain

Dates
- Royal assent: 12 July 1799
- Commencement: 12 July 1799 (Note: Section 1.)
- Repealed: 29 July 1800
Other legislation
| Repealed by | Unlawful Combinations of Workmen Act 1800 |
| Relates to | Combinations of Workmen Act 1825 |

Status: Repealed

Text of statute as originally enacted

The Combination Act 1799 (39 Geo. 3. c. 81) was an act of the Parliament of Great Britain. Titled "An Act to prevent Unlawful Combinations of Workmen", it prohibited trade unions and collective bargaining by British workers. The act received royal assent on 12 July 1799.

An additional act, the Combination Act 1800 (39 & 40 Geo. 3. c. 106), was passed the following year.

== Background ==
The 1799 and 1800 acts were passed under the government of William Pitt the Younger as a response to Jacobin activity and the fear of then-Home Secretary the Duke of Portland that workers would strike during a conflict to force the government to accede to their demands. Collectively these acts were known as the Combination Acts. Under these laws any combination of two or more masters, or two or more workmen, to lower or raise wages, or to increase or diminish the number of hours of work, or quantity of work to be done, was punishable at common law as a misdemeanour.

== Significance ==
The legislation drove labour organisations underground. Sympathy for the plight of the workers brought repeal of the acts in 1824. Lobbying by the radical tailor Francis Place played a role in this. However, in response to the series of strikes that followed, the Combinations of Workmen Act 1825 (6 Geo. 4. c. 129) was passed, which allowed trade unions but severely restricted their activity.

== Subsequent developments ==
Unlawful Combinations of Workmen Act 1800
- Act of Parliament
- Parliament of Great Britain
- Long title: An Act to repeal an Act, passed in the last Session of Parliament, intituled, "An Act to prevent Unlawful Combinations of Workmen"; and to substitute other provisions in lieu thereof.
- Citation: 39 & 40 Geo. 3. c. 106
- Territorial extent: Great Britain

Dates
- Royal assent: 29 July 1800
- Commencement: 29 July 1800 (Note: Section 1)
- Repealed: 21 June 1824
Other legislation
| Repeals/revokes | Combination Act 1799 |
| Amended by | Combination of Workmen Act 1824 |
| Repealed by | Masters and Workmen Arbitration Act 1824 |
| Relates to | Combinations of Workmen Act 1825 |

Status: Repealed

Text of statute as originally enacted

The whole act was repealed by section 1 of the Unlawful Combinations of Workmen Act 1800, which came into force on 29 July 1800.

== See also ==
- UK labour law
- Le Chapelier Law 1791, a similar law in France
- The Making of the English Working Class by E. P. Thompson
