= Artificers Going Abroad Act 1824 =

Act of the Parliament of the United Kingdom

- Act of Parliament
- Parliament of the United Kingdom
- Long title: An Act to repeal the Laws relative to Artificers going into Foreign Parts.
- Citation: 5 Geo. 4. c. 97
- Territorial extent: United Kingdom (Note: Section 1.)

Dates
- Royal assent: 21 June 1824
- Commencement: 21 June 1824
- Repealed: 5 August 1873
Other legislation
Amends	See § Repealed enactments
Repeals/revokes	See § Repealed enactments
Repealed by	Statute Law Revision Act 1873

Status: Repealed

Text of statute as originally enacted

The Artificers Going Abroad Act 1824 (5 Geo. 4. c. 97) was an act of the Parliament of the United Kingdom that repealed the enactments prohibiting skilled artificers and workmen from emigrating from the United Kingdom of Great Britain and Ireland.

== Provisions ==
=== Repealed enactments ===
Section 1 of the act repealed 6 enactments, listed in that section.

Citation	Short title	Description	Extent of repeal
5 Geo. 1. c. 27	Artificers Act 1718	An Act to prevent the Inconveniencies arising from seducing Artificers in the Manufactures of Great Britain into Foreign Parts.	The whole act.
23 Geo. 2. c. 13	Artificers, etc. Act 1749	An Act for the effectual punishing of Persons convicted of seducing Artificers in the Manufactures of Great Britain or Ireland out of the Dominions of the Crown of Great Britain; and to prevent the Exportation of Utensils made use of in the Woollen and Silk Manufactures from Great Britain or Ireland into Foreign Parts; and for the more easy and speedy Determination of Appeals allowed in certain Cases by an Act made in the last Session of Parliament, relating to Persons employed in the several Manufactures therein mentioned.	As relates to contracting with, enticing, persuading, or endeavouring to persuade, solicit, or seduce Manufacturers, Workmen, and Artificers, as therein mentioned.
22 Geo. 3. c. 60	Seducing Certain Artificers to go Beyond Sea, etc. Act 1782	An Act to prevent the seducing of Artificers or Workmen employed in printing Callicoes, Cottons, Muslins, and Linens, or in making or preparing Blocks, Plates, or other Implements used in that Manufactory, to go to Parts beyond the Seas; and to prohibit the Exportation to Foreign Parts any such Blocks, Plates, or other Implements.	As relates to contracting with, enticing, persuading, or endeavouring to seduce or encourage Artificers and Workmen as therein mentioned.
25 Geo. 3. c. 17 (I)	Seducing Artificers and Exporting Tools Prevention Act 1785	An Act to prevent the Practice of seducing Artificers and Manufacturers of this Kingdom, and of exporting the several Tools and Utensils made use of in preparing and working up the Manufactures thereof, into Parts beyond the Seas.	As relates to contracting with, enticing, persuading, or endeavouring to persuade, soliciting, or seducing Manufacturers, Workmen, or Artificers, as therein mentioned.
25 Geo. 3. c. 67	Exportation Act (No. 2) 1785	An Act to prohibit the Exportation to Foreign Parts of Tools and Utensils made use of in the Iron and Steel Manufactures of this Kingdom; and to prevent the seducing of Artificers or Workmen employed in those Manufactures to go into Parts beyond the Seas.	As relates to contracting with, enticing, persuading, or endeavouring to seduce or encourage Artificers or Workmen as therein mentioned.
39 Geo. 3. c. 56	Colliers (Scotland) Act 1799	An Act to explain and amend the Laws relative to Colliers in that Part of Great Britain called Scotland.	As punishes the seducing or attempting to seduce Colliers or others, as therein mentioned.

Section 1 of the act further repealed every other law, statute or enactment relative to the same subjects, or any of them, whether in force throughout or in any part of the United Kingdom of Great Britain and Ireland, save and except in as far as the same may have repealed any prior act or enactment.

== Subsequent developments ==
The whole act was repealed by section 1 of, and the schedule to, the Statute Law Revision Act 1873 (36 & 37 Vict. c. 91), which came into force on 5 August 1873.
