= Colliers and Salters (Scotland) Act 1775 =

Act of the Parliament of Great Britain to reduce slavery in Britain

- Act of Parliament
- Parliament of Great Britain
- Long title: An Act for altering, explaining, and amending, several Acts of the Parliament of Scotland, respecting Colliers, Coal-bearers, and Salters.
- Citation: 15 Geo. 3. c. 28
- Territorial extent: Great Britain

Dates
- Royal assent: 22 May 1775
- Commencement: 1 July 1775 (Note: Section 1.)
- Repealed: 21 August 1871
Other legislation
Amended by	Colliers (Scotland) Act 1799
Repealed by	Statute Law Revision Act 1871

Status: Repealed

Text of statute as originally enacted

The Colliers and Salters (Scotland) Act 1775 (15 Geo. 3. c. 28) was an act of the Parliament of Great Britain which changed the working conditions of miners in Scotland.

== Background ==
Colliers and Salters Act 1606
- Act of Parliament
- Parliament of Scotland
- Long title: Act Anent Coilyearis and Saltaris.
- Citation: c. 10 [12mo ed: c. 11]
- Territorial extent: Scotland

Dates
- Royal assent: 11 July 1606
Other legislation
Amended by	Statute Law Revision Act 1888
Repealed by	Statute Law Revision (Scotland) Act 1906

Status: Repealed

The Colliers and Salters Act 1606 (c. 10) had placed Scottish "coalyers, coal-bearers and salters" in a condition of permanent bondage to their employer. Any such worker who absented from that employer and sought to work elsewhere was to be punished as a thief. The act also included provision whereby vagabonds could be placed unwillingly into the same compulsory labour.

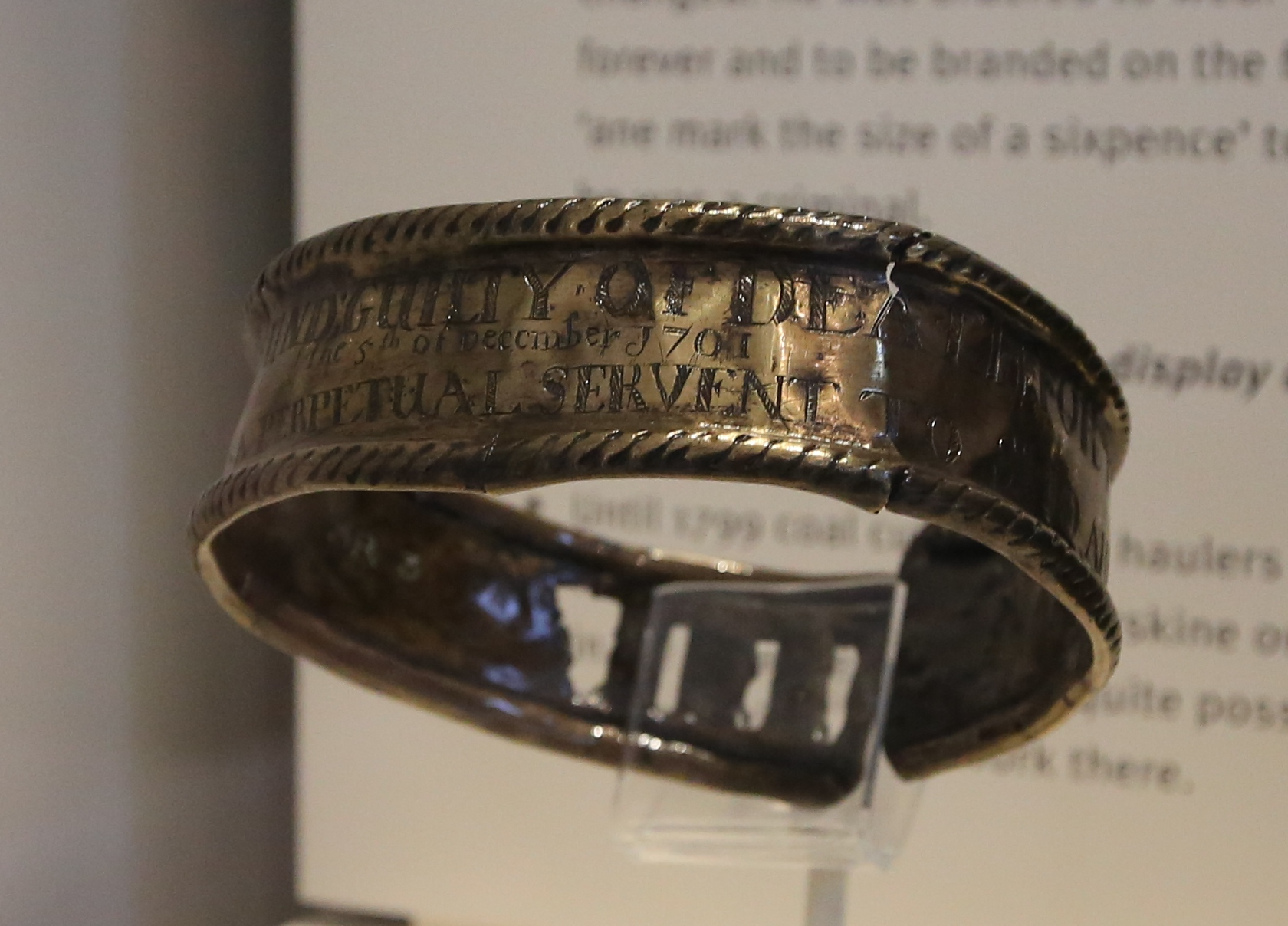
Scottish serf collar from 1701

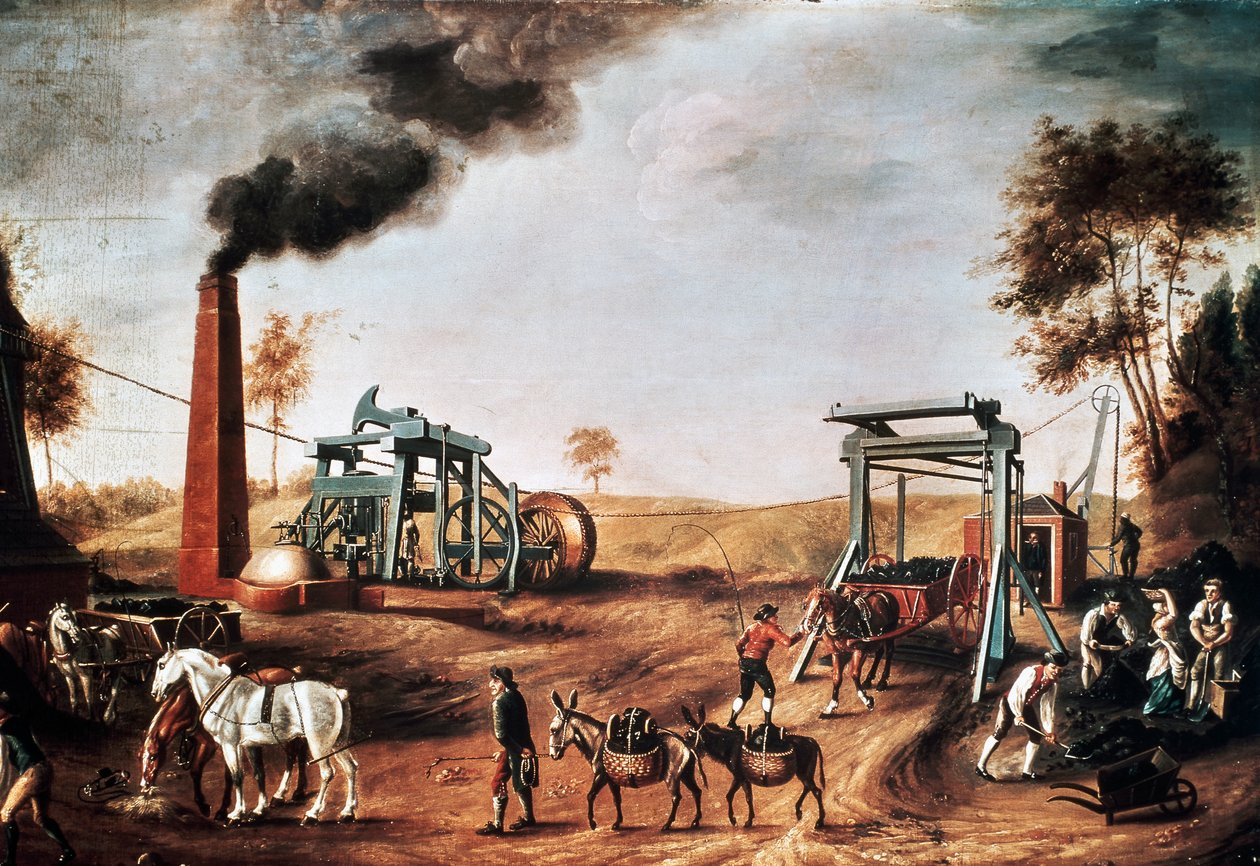
Pit head of a british coal mine, ca 1800

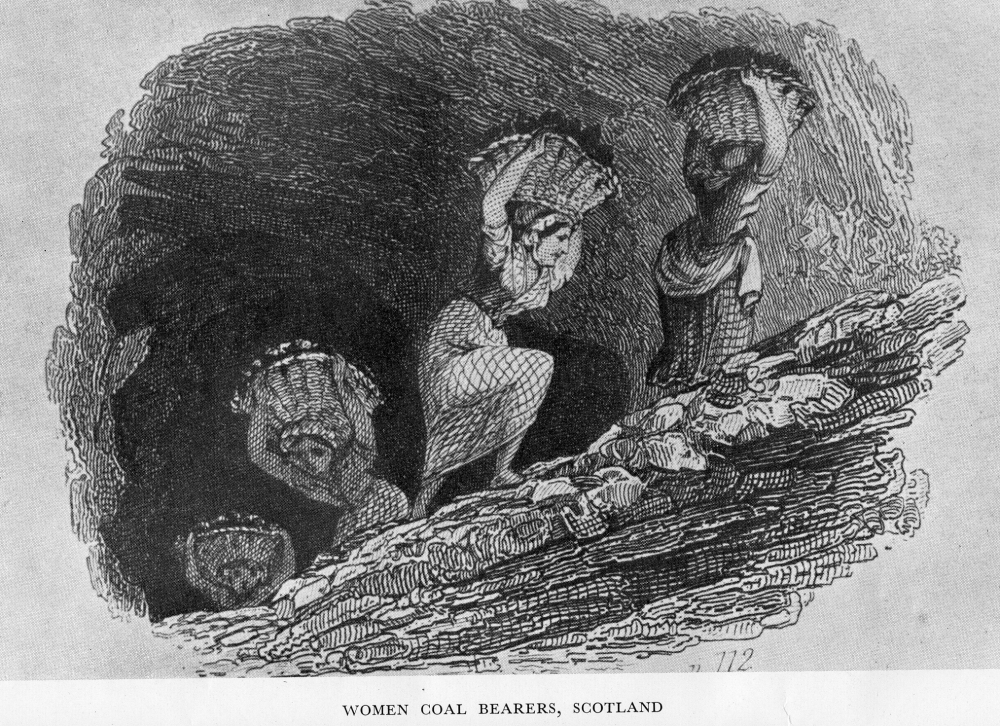
Women coal bearers

OUR SOVERAIGNE LORD, and Estates of this present Parliament, statutes and ordeins, that na person within this realme hereafter shall hyre or conduce any Salters, Coalyears or a coal-bearers, without a sufficient testimoniall of their Maister whom they last served, subscryved with his hand, or at least sufficient attestation of ane reasonable cause of their removing, made in presence of ane Baillie, of ane Magistrat of the part where they came fra. And in case any recesue, fee, hyre, supplie or intertaine any of the saids Coalyears, Salters or a Coal-bearers, without ane sufficient testimonie, as said is. The maisters whom fra they came, challenging their servants within yeare and day, that the partie from fra they are challenged, shall delyver them back againe within twentie foure houres, under the paine of ane hundreth pounds, to be paid to that persons whom fra they passed, and that for ilk person; and ilk tyme that they or any of them shall happen to be challenged, and not delyvered, and said is. And the said Coalyears, Coal-bearers and Salters to be esteemed, reput and halded as theives, and punished in their bodies, Viz. Sa many of them as shall receaue forewages and fees. And the saids Estates of this present Parliament, giues power and commission to all maisters and awners of Coal-heughs and pannes, to apprehend all vagabounds and sturdie beggers to be put to labour. — Anent Coilyearis and Saltaris

Erskine May notes that these workers were thereafter treated "a distinct class, not entitled to the same liberties as their fellow-subjects".

The 1775 act noted that the Scottish coal workers existed in "a state of slavery or bondage" and sought to address this. The main focus of the legislation was to remove the condition of servitude on new entrants to these industries, thus opening them to greater expansion. Although the act noted "the reproach of allowing such a State of Servitude to exist in a Free Country", it sought not to do "any injury to the present Masters", so created only gradual conditions whereby those already in servitude in the mines could seek to be liberated from it after a period of seven or ten years depending on age. The act also included a provision for extending that term by two years if a miner acted in combination with others.

== Consequences ==
Colliers (Scotland) Act 1799
- Act of Parliament
- Parliament of Great Britain
- Long title: An act to explain and amend the laws relative to colliers in that part of Great Britain called Scotland.
- Citation: 39 Geo. 3. c. 56
- Territorial extent: Great Britain

Dates
- Royal assent: 13 June 1799
- Commencement: 13 June 1799
- Repealed: 30 July 1948
Other legislation
Amended by	Combination of Workmen Act 1824; Artificers Going Abroad Act 1824; Combination of Workmen Act 1825
Repealed by	Statute Law Revision Act 1871; Statute Law Revision Act 1948

Status: Repealed

Text of statute as originally enacted

As Erskine May noted, "these poor ignorant slaves, generally in debt to their masters, were rarely in a condition to press their claims to freedom" so the later conditions were largely ineffective. It took a further act, the Colliers (Scotland) Act 1799 (39 Geo. 3. c. 56), to liberate the remaining mine workers from the conditions created by the 1606 act, while also extending provisions against organised labour.

== Subsequent developments ==
The whole act was repealed by section 1 of, and the schedule to, the Statute Law Revision Act 1871 (34 & 35 Vict. c. 116), which came into force on 21 August 1871.
