= List of acts of the Parliament of Scotland from 1426 =

This is a list of acts of the Parliament of Scotland for the year 1426.

It lists acts of Parliament of the old Parliament of Scotland, that was merged with the old Parliament of England to form the Parliament of Great Britain, by the Union with England Act 1707 (c. 7).

For other years, see list of acts of the Parliament of Scotland. For the period after 1707, see list of acts of the Parliament of Great Britain.

== 1426 ==
The 5th parliament of James I, held in Perth on 30 September 1426.

| Short title, or popular name | Citation | Royal assent |
Long title
| Customs Act 1426 (repealed) | 1426 c. 1 (Note: This is the citation in the Record Edition.); 1426 c. 76 (Note: This is the citation in the Duodecimal Edition.) | 30 September 1426 |
Anent the custum of salmondis and uthir fische. About the custom of salmon and other fish. (Repealed by Statute Law Revision (Scotland) Act 1906 (6 Edw. 7. c. 38))
| Deacons of Crafts Act 1426 (repealed) | 1426 c. 2; 1426 c. 77 | 30 September 1426 |
Of the dekynis of craftis. Of the deacons of crafts. (Repealed by Deacons of Crafts Act 1427 (c. 4))
| Craftsmen's Work Act 1426 (repealed) | 1426 c. 3; 1426 c. 78 | 30 September 1426 |
Of the price of the werk maid by craftismen. Of the price of the work made by craftsmen. (Repealed by Statute Law Revision (Scotland) Act 1906 (6 Edw. 7. c. 38))
| Wages Act 1426 (repealed) | 1426 c. 4; 1426 c. 79 | 30 September 1426 |
Of the fee of werkmen. Of the fee of workmen. (Repealed by Statute Law Revision (Scotland) Act 1906 (6 Edw. 7. c. 38))
| Workmen Act 1426 (repealed) | 1426 c. 5; 1426 c. 80 | 30 September 1426 |
Of the punicion of werkmen that fulfillis nocht thar werk at the tyme thai hecht. Of the punishment of workmen that do not fulfil their work at the time they promise. (Repealed by Statute Law Revision (Scotland) Act 1906 (6 Edw. 7. c. 38))
| Agriculture Act 1426 (repealed) | 1426 c. 6; 1426 c. 81 | 30 September 1426 |
Anent the sawing of quhete peis and benis. About the ploughing of wheat, peas and beans. (Repealed by Statute Law Revision (Scotland) Act 1906 (6 Edw. 7. c. 38))
| Castles Act 1426 (repealed) | 1426 c. 7; 1426 c. 82 | 30 September 1426 |
Anent the biggyn and reparelling of castellis and maner placis beyonde the mownth. About the building and repairing of castles and manor places beyond the Mounth. (Repealed by Statute Law Revision (Scotland) Act 1906 (6 Edw. 7. c. 38))

=== Sources ===
- Alexander, William (1841). "Acta Parliamentorum Regis Jacobi Primi". An Abridgement of the Acts of the Parliaments of Scotland. Edinburgh: Adam and Charles Black. p. 439 – via Google Books.
- Alexander, William (1841). "Acta Parliamentorum Regis Jacobi Primi". An Abridgement of the Acts of the Parliaments of Scotland. Edinburgh: Adam and Charles Black. p. 439 – via Google Books.
- Chronological Table of the Statutes. London: Her Majesty's Stationery Office. 1972. p. 1315 – via Google Books.
- "Index of Statutes: James I (1406-1437)". Records of the Parliaments of Scotland to 1707. University of St Andrews.

== See also ==
- List of legislation in the United Kingdom
- Records of the Parliaments of Scotland
