= List of acts of the Parliament of Scotland from 1427 =

This is a list of acts of the Parliament of Scotland for the year 1427.

It lists acts of Parliament of the old Parliament of Scotland, that was merged with the old Parliament of England to form the Parliament of Great Britain, by the Union with England Act 1707 (c. 7).

For other years, see list of acts of the Parliament of Scotland. For the period after 1707, see list of acts of the Parliament of Great Britain.

== 1427 ==
=== July ===
The 6th parliament of James I, held in Perth.

Short title, or popular name	Citation	Royal assent
Long title
Oaths Act 1427 (repealed)	July 1427 c. 1 (Note: This is the citation in the Record Edition.); 1426 c. 83 (Note: This is the citation in the Duodecimal Edition.)	1 July 1427
De juramento auditorum ad causas et querelas terminandas. On the oath of the auditors to terminate cases and complaints. (Repealed by Statute Law Revision (Scotland) Act 1906 (6 Edw. 7. c. 38))
Travellers Abroad Act 1427 (repealed)	July 1427 c. 2; 1426 c. 84	1 July 1427
De financia facienda per clericos aut laicos ad partes ultramarinas se transferentes. Of finances to be made by clerics or laymen transferring themselves to overseas parts. (Repealed by Statute Law Revision (Scotland) Act 1906 (6 Edw. 7. c. 38))
Travellers Act 1427 (repealed)	July 1427 c. 3; 1426 c. 85	1 July 1427
De hostellaris seu hospiciis publicis. Of hostelries or public inns. (Repealed by Statute Law Revision (Scotland) Act 1906 (6 Edw. 7. c. 38))
Deacons of Crafts Act 1427 (repealed)	July 1427 c. 4; 1426 c. 86	1 July 1427
Revocacio ordinacionum super artificum decapis. Revocation of regulations on the deacons of crafts. (Repealed by Statute Law Revision (Scotland) Act 1906 (6 Edw. 7. c. 38))
Spiritual Court Procedure Act 1427 (repealed)	July 1427 c. 5; 1426 c. 87	1 July 1427
Pro expedicione litium in curia spirituali. For the campaign of litigation in the spiritual court. (Repealed by Statute Law Revision (Scotland) Act 1906 (6 Edw. 7. c. 38))
Arbitration Act 1427 (repealed)	July 1427 c. 6; 1426 c. 87	1 July 1427
De arbitriis. Of decisions. (Repealed by Statute Law Revision (Scotland) Act 1906 (6 Edw. 7. c. 38))
Exceptions Act 1427 (repealed)	July 1427 c. 7 — (Note: This act is not listed in the Duodecimal Edition.)	1 July 1427
De excepcionibus falsis et frivolis. On false and frivolous exceptions. (Repealed by Statute Law Revision (Scotland) Act 1906 (6 Edw. 7. c. 38))
Jurisdiction over Scotsmen Dying Abroad Act 1427 (repealed)	July 1427 c. 8; 1426 c. 88	1 July 1427
De causis mercatorum extra regnum decedencium tractandis. Treating the reasons for the departure of merchants outside the kingdom. (Repealed by the Statute Law Revision (Scotland) Act 1964 (c. 80))

=== March ===
The 7th parliament of James I, held in Perth.

Short title, or popular name	Citation	Royal assent
Long title
Customs Act 1427 (repealed)	March 1427 c. 1 (Note: This is the citation in the Record Edition.); 1427 c. 100 (Note: This is the citation in the Duodecimal Edition.)	1 March 1428
Of thaim that has oute of the realme merchandice nocht payande the custum. (Repealed by Statute Law Revision (Scotland) Act 1906 (6 Edw. 7. c. 38))
Members of Parliament Act 1427 or the Members of Parliament Act 1428 (repealed)	March 1427 c. 2; 1427 c. 101	1 March 1428
Of the commissaris of the schiris and the commoun spekar of the parliament. (Repealed by Statute Law Revision (Scotland) Act 1906 (6 Edw. 7. c. 38))
Craftsmen Act 1427 (repealed)	March 1427 c. 3; 1427 c. 102	1 March 1428
Anentis the men of craftis in burowis. Regarding the men of crafts in burghs. (Repealed by Statute Law Revision (Scotland) Act 1906 (6 Edw. 7. c. 38))
Beggars Act 1427 (repealed)	March 1427 c. 4; 1427 c. 103	1 March 1428
Adicioun to the statut of beggaris. (Note: Beggars Act 1424 (c. 25)); Addition to the statute of beggars. (Repealed by Statute Law Revision (Scotland) Act 1906 (6 Edw. 7. c. 38))
Wolves Act 1427 (repealed)	March 1427 c. 5; 1427 c. 104	1 March 1428
That baronis ger seik the quhelpis of the wolfis and sla thame. The barons cause seek the whelps of wolves and slay them. (Repealed by Statute Law Revision (Scotland) Act 1906 (6 Edw. 7. c. 38))
Salmon Act 1427 (repealed)	March 1427 c. 6 — (Note: This act is not listed in the Duodecimal Edition.)	1 March 1428
Of cruffis in waterris. Of cruives in waters. (Repealed by Statute Law Revision (Scotland) Act 1906 (6 Edw. 7. c. 38))
Shipping Act 1427 or the Shipping Act 1428 (repealed)	March 1427 c. 7 —	1 March 1428
The leife to merchandis to fure thar gudis in schippis of vther cuntries. The permission to merchants to ferry their goods in ships of other countries. (Repealed by Statute Law Revision (Scotland) Act 1906 (6 Edw. 7. c. 38))
Lepers Act 1427 (repealed)	March 1427 c. 8; 1427 c. 105	1 March 1428
Anent lipper folk. About leper folk. (Repealed by Statute Law Revision (Scotland) Act 1906 (6 Edw. 7. c. 38))
Barratry Act 1427 or the Barratry Act 1428 (repealed)	March 1427 c. 9; 1427 c. 106	1 March 1428
Anent the passage of clerkis out of the realme. About the passage of clerics out of the realm. (Repealed by Statute Law Revision (Scotland) Act 1906 (6 Edw. 7. c. 38))
Attendance at Courts Act 1427 (repealed)	March 1427 c. 10 —	1 March 1428
That na man cum to courtis with gaddering. That no man come to court with a gathering. (Repealed by Statute Law Revision (Scotland) Act 1906 (6 Edw. 7. c. 38))
Interpretation of Acts Act 1427 or the Interpretation of Acts Act 1428 (repealed)	March 1427 c. 11; 1427 c. 107	1 March 1428
Anent interpreting the kingis statutis. About interpretting the king's statutes. (Repealed by Statute Law Revision (Scotland) Act 1906 (6 Edw. 7. c. 38))
Wild Birds Act 1427 (repealed)	March 1427 c. 12; 1427 c. 108	1 March 1428
Anent wylde foulis. About wild fowl. (Repealed by Statute Law Revision (Scotland) Act 1906 (6 Edw. 7. c. 38))

=== Sources ===
- Alexander, William (1841). "Acta Parliamentorum Regis Jacobi Primi". An Abridgement of the Acts of the Parliaments of Scotland. Edinburgh: Adam and Charles Black. p. 439 – via Google Books.
- Alexander, William (1841). "Acta Parliamentorum Regis Jacobi Primi". An Abridgement of the Acts of the Parliaments of Scotland. Edinburgh: Adam and Charles Black. p. 439 – via Google Books.
- Chronological Table of the Statutes. London: Her Majesty's Stationery Office. 1972. pp. 1315–1316 – via Google Books.
- "Index of Statutes: James I (1406-1337)". Records of the Parliaments of Scotland to 1707. University of St Andrews.

== See also ==
- List of legislation in the United Kingdom
- Records of the Parliaments of Scotland
