= List of acts of the Parliament of Scotland from 1551 =

This is a list of acts of the Parliament of Scotland for the year 1551.

It lists acts of Parliament of the old Parliament of Scotland, that was merged with the old Parliament of England to form the Parliament of Great Britain, by the Union with England Act 1707 (c. 7).

For other years, see list of acts of the Parliament of Scotland. For the period after 1707, see list of acts of the Parliament of Great Britain.

== 1551 ==
=== May ===
The 4th parliament of Mary, held in Edinburgh from 29 May 1551.

Short title, or popular name	Citation	Royal assent
Long title
Excommunication Act 1551 (repealed)	May 1551 c. 1 (Note: This is the citation in the Record Edition.); 1551 c. 7 (Note: This is the citation in the Duodecimal Edition.)	29 May 1551
Anent thame that wilfullie incurris the panis of cursing and lyis thairin be the space of ane yeir or ressaifis the halie Sacrament under the said cursing. Against those who willfully incur the penalty of cursing and lying therein, for the space of one year, or receive the holy Sacrament under the said cursing. (Repealed by Statute Law Revision (Scotland) Act 1906 (6 Edw. 7. c. 38))
Traitors Act 1551 (repealed)	May 1551 c. 2; 1551 c. 8	29 May 1551
Anent tratouris banist or fugitive without licence respect remissioun or supersedere that cummis and resortis agane within this Realme. Regarding traitors banished or fugitive without licence, respect remission or supersedere that come and resort again within this Realm. (Repealed by Statute Law Revision (Scotland) Act 1906 (6 Edw. 7. c. 38))
Game Act 1551 (repealed)	May 1551 c. 3; 1551 c. 9	29 May 1551
Anentis thame that schutis with gunnis at deir and wylde foulis. About those that shoot with guns at deer and wildfowl. (Repealed by Statute Law Revision (Scotland) Act 1906 (6 Edw. 7. c. 38))

=== February ===
The 5th parliament of Mary, held in Edinburgh from 1 February 1552.

Short title, or popular name	Citation	Royal assent
Long title
Wine Act 1551 (repealed)	February 1551 c. 1 (Note: This is the citation in the Record Edition.); 1551 c. 11 (Note: This is the citation in the Duodecimal Edition.)	1 February 1552
For suppressing of derth of vivers and wynis. For suppressing the dearth of victuals and wines. (Repealed by Statute Law Revision (Scotland) Act 1906 (6 Edw. 7. c. 38))
Prices of Fowls Act 1551 (repealed)	February 1551 c. 2; 1551 c. 12	1 February 1552
Anent the execution of the act (Note: An act of the King's Secret Council.) maid vpone the prices of all wylde foulis and tame foulis. Regarding the execution of the act made upon the prices of wild fowl and tame fowl. (Repealed by Statute Law Revision (Scotland) Act 1906 (6 Edw. 7. c. 38))
Defence of the Realm Act 1551 (repealed)	February 1551 c. 3; 1551 c. 13	1 February 1552
The articlis and punctis concludit upone assurit Scottismen with Ingland. The articles and points concluded upon assured Scots with Englishmen. (Repealed by Statute Law Revision (Scotland) Act 1906 (6 Edw. 7. c. 38))
Defence of the Realm (No. 2) Act 1551 (repealed)	February 1551 c. 4; 1551 c. 14	1 February 1552
The secund article upone assurit persounis. The second article upon assured persons. (Repealed by Statute Law Revision (Scotland) Act 1906 (6 Edw. 7. c. 38))
Defence of the Realm (No. 3) Act 1551 (repealed)	February 1551 c. 5; 1551 c. 15	1 February 1552
The thrid article upone assurit persounis. The third article upon assured persons. (Repealed by Statute Law Revision (Scotland) Act 1906 (6 Edw. 7. c. 38))
Not public and general	February 1551 c. 6 — (Note: This act is not listed in the Duodecimal Edition.)	1 February 1552
Declaratioun in favouris of Archibald erle of Anguse (Note: Archibald Douglas, 6th Earl of Angus.) and utheris. Declaration in favour of Archibald, Earl of Angus, and others.
Blasphemy Act 1551 (repealed)	February 1551 c. 7; 1551 c. 16	1 February 1552
Anent aithis sweiring execratiounis and blasphematioun of the name of God. Regarding oath swearing, execrations and blasphemy of the name of God. (Repealed by Statute Law Revision (Scotland) Act 1906 (6 Edw. 7. c. 38))
Disturbance in Church Act 1551 (repealed)	February 1551 c. 8; 1551 c. 17	1 February 1552
Aganis persounis quhilkis makis perturbatioun in the kirk the tyme of devine service. Against persons who makes perturbation in the church at the time of divine service. (Repealed by Statute Law Revision (Scotland) Act 1906 (6 Edw. 7. c. 38))
Excommunication (No. 2) Act 1551 (repealed)	February 1551 c. 9; 1551 c. 18	1 February 1552
Anent persounis knawand thame selfis under the proces of cursing that enteris in the kirk in the tyme of devine service. Regarding persons knowing themselves to be under the process of cursing that enter the church in the time of divine service. (Repealed by Statute Law Revision (Scotland) Act 1906 (6 Edw. 7. c. 38))
Excommunication (No. 3) Act 1551 (repealed)	February 1551 c. 10 —	1 February 1552
Anent persounis under proces of cursing that compellis kirkmen to say messe in thair presence. Regarding persons under process of cursing that compel priests to say mass in their presence. (Repealed by Statute Law Revision (Scotland) Act 1906 (6 Edw. 7. c. 38))
Bigamy Act 1551 (repealed)	February 1551 c. 11; 1551 c. 19	1 February 1552
Anent thame that maryis twa sindrie wyfis or husbandis levand togiddir undevorsit. Concerning those who marry two sundry wives or husbands, living together, undivorced. (Repealed by Statute Law Revision (Scotland) Act 1964 (c. 80))
Adultery Act 1551 (repealed)	February 1551 c. 12; 1551 c. 20	1 February 1552
Anent oppin and incorrigibill adulteraris. Regarding open and incorrigible adulterers. (Repealed by Statute Law Revision (Scotland) Act 1906 (6 Edw. 7. c. 38))
Maltmakers Act 1551 (repealed)	February 1551 c. 13 —	1 February 1552
Anent the derth rasit in this realme be malt makaris. Regarding the dearth raised in this realm by maltmakers. (Repealed by Statute Law Revision (Scotland) Act 1906 (6 Edw. 7. c. 38))
Ferries Act 1551 (repealed)	February 1551 c. 14; 1551 c. 21	1 February 1552
Anent ferryaris. Regarding ferrymen. (Repealed by Statute Law Revision (Scotland) Act 1906 (6 Edw. 7. c. 38))
Meat Act 1551 (repealed)	February 1551 c. 15 —	1 February 1552
Anent the slauchter of lambis lapronis and young poutis. Concerning the slaughter of lambs, rabbits and young pouts. (Repealed by Statute Law Revision (Scotland) Act 1906 (6 Edw. 7. c. 38))
Beggars Act 1551 (repealed)	February 1551 c. 16 —	1 February 1552
Ratificatioun of the actis for stanching of beggaris (Note: Beggars Act 1424 (c. 25)) with additioun. Ratification of the act for stanching of beggars, with addition. (Repealed by Statute Law Revision (Scotland) Act 1906 (6 Edw. 7. c. 38))
Notaries Act 1551 (repealed)	February 1551 c. 17; 1551 c. 22	1 February 1552
Ratificatioun of the actis aganis fals notaris with additioun. Ratification of the act against false notaries, with addition. (Repealed by Statute Law Revision (Scotland) Act 1906 (6 Edw. 7. c. 38))
Craftsmen Act 1551 (repealed)	February 1551 c. 18; 1551 c. 23	1 February 1552
Anent the exhorbitant prices rasit be craftismen. Regarding the exorbitant prices charged by craftsmen. (Repealed by Statute Law Revision (Scotland) Act 1906 (6 Edw. 7. c. 38))
Notaries (No. 2) Act 1551 (repealed)	February 1551 c. 19; 1551 c. 24	1 February 1552
For executioun of the act concerning notaris (Note: Notaries (No. 2) Act 1540 (December c. 13)) with additioun. For execution of the act concerning notaries, with addition. (Repealed by Statute Law Revision (Scotland) Act 1906 (6 Edw. 7. c. 38))
Hares Act 1551 (repealed)	February 1551 c. 20 —	1 February 1552
Anent the slaying of hairis in forbodin tyme. Concerning the slaying of hares in forbidden time. (Repealed by Statute Law Revision (Scotland) Act 1906 (6 Edw. 7. c. 38))
Deer Act 1551 (repealed)	February 1551 c. 21 —	1 February 1552
Anent thame that slais dais or rais. Concerning the slaying of doe deers and roe deers. (Repealed by Statute Law Revision (Scotland) Act 1906 (6 Edw. 7. c. 38))
Sumptuary Act 1551 (repealed)	February 1551 c. 22; 1551 c. 25	1 February 1552
Anentis the eschewing of derth and the ordouring of everie mannis hous in his coursis and discheis of meit. Regarding the eschewing of dearth, and the ordering of every man's house in his courses and dishes of meat. (Repealed by Statute Law Revision (Scotland) Act 1906 (6 Edw. 7. c. 38))
Packing and Peeling Act 1551 (repealed)	February 1551 c. 23 —	1 February 1552
Anentis paking and peling. Regarding packing and peeling. (Repealed by Statute Law Revision (Scotland) Act 1906 (6 Edw. 7. c. 38))
Forestallers Act 1551 (repealed)	February 1551 c. 24 —	1 February 1552
Aganis regrataris and foirstallaris of mercatis. Regarding resellers and forestallers of markets. (Repealed by Statute Law Revision (Scotland) Act 1906 (6 Edw. 7. c. 38))
Sea Fish Act 1551 (repealed)	February 1551 c. 25 —	1 February 1552
Anentis the having of quhite fische furth of the realme. Concerning the exporting of white fish out of the realm. (Repealed by Statute Law Revision (Scotland) Act 1906 (6 Edw. 7. c. 38))
Printers Act 1551 (repealed)	February 1551 c. 26; 1551 c. 27	1 February 1552
That prentaris prent na bukis without ane licence. That printers print no books without a licence. (Repealed by Statute Law Revision (Scotland) Act 1906 (6 Edw. 7. c. 38))
French Ambassador Act 1551 (repealed)	February 1551 c. 27 —	1 February 1552
Of letters to the maist Christin king (Note: 'Most Christian King' was the style of the King of France.) in favouris of Monsieure Dosel (Note: Henri Cleutin, seigneur d'Oisel et de Villeparisis.) his ambaxatour. Of letters to the most Christian king in favour of Monsieur D'Oisel, his ambassador. (Repealed by Statute Law Revision (Scotland) Act 1906 (6 Edw. 7. c. 38))
Lord Governors' Actings Act 1551 (repealed)	February 1551 c. 28 —	1 February 1552
Ratificatioun of the contract maid betuix my Lord Governour and Schir James Hammiltoun of Craufurde Johne knycht. Ratification of the contract made between my Lord Governor and Sir James Hamilton of Crawfordjohn, knight. (Repealed by Statute Law Revision (Scotland) Act 1906 (6 Edw. 7. c. 38))
Royal Contract Act 1551 (repealed)	February 1551 c. 29 —	1 February 1552
Ratificatioun of the act maid betuix the Quenis grace mother to pur Soverane lady and my lord Governouris grace. Ratification of the act made between the Queen's grace, mother to our Sovereign lady, and my Lord Governor's grace. (Repealed by Statute Law Revision (Scotland) Act 1906 (6 Edw. 7. c. 38))
Rents of Burnt Tenements Act 1551 (repealed)	February 1551 c. 30; 1551 c. 10	1 February 1552
Act of Registratioun in the bukis of Counsall of certane articlis entitulate. Act of Registration in the books of Council of certain articles stated. (Repealed by Statute Law Revision (Scotland) Act 1906 (6 Edw. 7. c. 38))

=== Sources ===
- Alexander, William (1841). "Acta Parliamentorum Mariæ Reginæ". An Abridgement of the Acts of the Parliaments of Scotland. Edinburgh: Adam and Charles Black. p. A18 – via Google Books.
- Alexander, William (1841). "Acta Parliamentorum Mariæ Reginæ". An Abridgement of the Acts of the Parliaments of Scotland. Edinburgh: Adam and Charles Black. p. A18 – via Google Books.
- Chronological Table of the Statutes. London: Her Majesty's Stationery Office. 1972. pp. 1331–1332 – via Google Books.
- "Index of Statutes: Mary I (1542-1567)". Records of the Parliaments of Scotland to 1707. University of St Andrews.

== See also ==
- List of legislation in the United Kingdom
- Records of the Parliaments of Scotland
