= Silk Manufactures Act 1824 =

Act of the Parliament of the United Kingdom

- Act of Parliament
- Parliament of the United Kingdom
- Long title: An Act to repeal certain Acts of His late Majesty, relating to the Wages of Persons employed in the Manufacture of Silk, and of Silk mixed with other Materials.
- Citation: 5 Geo. 4. c. 66
- Territorial extent: United Kingdom

Dates
- Royal assent: 17 June 1824
- Commencement: 17 June 1824 (Note: The Acts of Parliament (Commencement) Act 1793.)
- Repealed: 5 August 1873
Other legislation
| Repeals/revokes | See § Repealed enactments |
| Repealed by | Statute Law Revision Act 1873 |

Status: Repealed

Text of statute as originally enacted

The Silk Manufactures Act 1824 (5 Geo. 4. c. 66) was an act of the Parliament of the United Kingdom that repealed seven earlier enactments which had empowered magistrates to fix the wages of persons employed in the silk-weaving trade in and around London and in Dublin.

== Background ==
From 1773, a series of acts empowered the Lord Mayor, Recorder and Aldermen of the City of London, and magistrates in Middlesex, Westminster and the Tower Liberty, to settle and declare the wages of journeymen silk weavers working within their jurisdictions, beginning with the Silk Manufactures Act 1772 (13 Geo. 3. c. 68); a corresponding act of the Parliament of Ireland, the Silk Manufacture Act 1779 (19 & 20 Geo. 3. c. 24 (I)), gave the Dublin Society the same power over silk weavers' wages in Dublin. These wage-fixing statutes became known collectively as the Spitalfields Acts, after the London district that was the centre of the trade.

By the early 1820s, London silk manufacturers argued that the fixed wages and piece-rates prevented them from introducing new machinery or from competing with unregulated centres such as Manchester and Norwich, and that production was as a result being driven away from Spitalfields. A petition for repeal, presented to the House of Commons on 9 May 1823 by Thomas Wilson on behalf of silk manufacturers in London and Westminster, was supported by William Huskisson, then President of the Board of Trade, and by the economist David Ricardo; Huskisson undertook to bring in a bill to repeal the acts. The resulting bill received royal assent on 17 June 1824, in the same parliamentary session as the reduction of duties on imported raw and thrown silk and the repeal of the prohibition on importing manufactured silk goods.

== Provisions ==
=== Repealed enactments ===
Section 1 of the act repealed 7 enactments, recited in the act's preamble.

| Citation | Short title | Description | Extent of repeal |
|---|---|---|---|
| 13 Geo. 3. c. 68 | Silk Manufactures Act 1772 | The Act of the Session of the Thirteenth Year of King George the Third, Chapter Sixty-eight, intituled An Act to empower the Magistrates therein mentioned to settle and regulate the Wages of Persons employed in the Silk Manufacture within their respective Jurisdictions. | The whole act. |
| 32 Geo. 3. c. 44 | Silk Manufacture Act 1792 | The Act of the Session of the Thirty-second Year of King George the Third, Chapter Forty-four, intituled An Act for extending the Provisions of an Act made in the Thirteenth Year of the Reign of His present Majesty, intituled An Act to empower the Magistrates therein mentioned to settle and regulate the Wages of Persons employed in the Silk Manufacture within their respective Jurisdiction, to Manufactories of Silk mixed with other Materials, and for the more effectual Punishment of Buyers and Receivers of Silk purloined and embezzled by Persons employed in the Manufacture thereof. | The whole act. |
| 51 Geo. 3. c. 7 | Silk Manufacture Act 1811 | The Act of the Session of the Fifty-first Year of King George the Third, Chapter Seven, intituled An Act to amend Two Acts, of the Thirteenth and Thirty-second Years of His present Majesty, relating to the Wages of Persons employed in the Silk Manufacture. | The whole act. |
| 19 & 20 Geo. 3. c. 24 (I) | Silk Manufacture Act 1779 | The Act of the Parliament of Ireland of the Session of the Nineteenth and Twentieth Years of King George the Third, Chapter Twenty-four, intituled An Act for the better Regulation of the Silk Manufacture. | The whole act. |
| 36 Geo. 3. c. 37 (I) | Silk Manufacture Act 1796 | The Act of the Parliament of Ireland of the Session of the Thirty-sixth Year of King George the Third, Chapter Thirty-seven, intituled An Act to explain and amend an Act passed in the Nineteenth and Twentieth Years of His Majesty's Reign, intituled An Act for the better Regulation of the Silk Manufacture. | The whole act. |
| 40 Geo. 3. c. 17 (I) | Silk Manufacture Act 1800 | The Act of the Parliament of Ireland of the Session of the Fortieth Year of King George the Third, Chapter Seventeen, intituled An Act to continue an Act passed in the Thirty-sixth Year of His present Majesty's Reign, intituled An Act to explain and amend an Act passed in the Nineteenth and Twentieth Years of His Majesty's Reign, intituled An Act for the better Regulation of the Silk Manufacture. | The whole act. |
| 50 Geo. 3. c. 27 | Silk Manufacture (Ireland) Act 1810 | The Act of the Session of the Fiftieth Year of King George the Third, Chapter Twenty-seven, intituled An Act to continue, until the Twenty-fifth Day of March One thousand eight hundred and thirty-one, certain Acts made in the Parliament of Ireland, for the better Regulation of the Silk Manufacture. | The whole act. |

== Subsequent developments ==
The whole act was repealed by section 1 of, and the schedule to, the Statute Law Revision Act 1873 (36 & 37 Vict. c. 91), which came into force on 5 August 1873.
