= List of acts of the Parliament of Scotland from 1581 =

This is a list of acts of the Parliament of Scotland for the year 1581.

It lists acts of Parliament of the old Parliament of Scotland, that was merged with the old Parliament of England to form the Parliament of Great Britain, by the Union with England Act 1707 (c. 7).

For other years, see list of acts of the Parliament of Scotland. For the period after 1707, see list of acts of the Parliament of Great Britain.

== 1581 ==
The 7th parliament of James VI, held in Edinburgh from 24 October 1581 until 29 November 1581.

Short title, or popular name	Citation	Royal assent
Long title
Church Act 1581 (repealed)	1581 c. 1 (Note: This is the citation in the Record Edition.); 1581 c. 99 (Note: This is the citation in the Duodecimal Edition.)	29 November 1581
The ratificatioun of the libertie of the trew kirk of god and religioun with confirmatioun of the lawis and actis maid to that effect of before. (Repealed by Statute Law Revision (Scotland) Act 1906 (6 Edw. 7. c. 38))
Stipends Act 1581 (repealed)	1581 c. 2; 1581 c. 100	29 November 1581
Anent prouisioun of ministeris and certane stipendis for thame at all paroche kirkis. (Repealed by Statute Law (Repeals) Act 1974 (c. 22))
Benefices Act 1581 (repealed)	1581 c. 3; 1581 c. 101	29 November 1581
Aganis dilapidationis of rentis of benefices providit to ministeris in title for thair liftymes. (Repealed by Statute Law Revision (Scotland) Act 1906 (6 Edw. 7. c. 38))
Presentation of Ministers Act 1581 (repealed)	1581 c. 4; 1581 c. 102	29 November 1581
That ministeris salbe presentit be the kingis majestie and the lawit patronis to all benefices of cuir under prelacyis. (Repealed by Statute Law Revision (Scotland) Act 1906 (6 Edw. 7. c. 38))
Blasphemy Act 1581 (repealed)	1581 c. 5; 1581 c. 103	29 November 1581
For punishment of the blasphemy of goddis name and utheris horribill aithis. (Repealed by Statute Law Revision (Scotland) Act 1906 (6 Edw. 7. c. 38))
Pilgrimages Act 1581 (repealed)	1581 c. 6; 1581 c. 104	29 November 1581
Aganis passing in pilgramage to chapel lis wallis and croces and the superstitious observing of diverse uther papisticall rytes. (Repealed by Statute Law Revision (Scotland) Act 1906 (6 Edw. 7. c. 38))
Adultery Act 1581 (repealed)	1581 c. 7; 1581 c. 105	29 November 1581
The explanatioun of the act tuiching the notoure and manifest committaris of adulterie. (Repealed by Statute Law Revision (Scotland) Act 1906 (6 Edw. 7. c. 38))
Papists Act 1581 (repealed)	1581 c. 8; 1581 c. 106	29 November 1581
Aganis fugitivis and utheris papistis practising aganis the trew religioun. (Repealed by Statute Law Revision (Scotland) Act 1906 (6 Edw. 7. c. 38))
Committee on Articles Act 1581 (repealed)	1581 c. 9 — (Note: This act is not listed in the Duodecimal Edition.)	29 November 1581
Commissioun to certane of everie estait with the kingis majesteis officiaris to treate and conclude on certane articles and supplicatiounis eftir the end of present parliament. (Repealed by Statute Law Revision (Scotland) Act 1906 (6 Edw. 7. c. 38))
Coin Act 1581 (repealed)	1581 c. 10; 1581 c. 106	29 November 1581
Anent the cuinye. (Repealed by Statute Law Revision (Scotland) Act 1906 (6 Edw. 7. c. 38))
Bullion Act 1581 (repealed)	1581 c. 11; 1581 c. 107	29 November 1581
Ratificatioun of the actis anent the Inbringing of bulyeoun. (Repealed by Statute Law Revision (Scotland) Act 1906 (6 Edw. 7. c. 38))
Customs Act 1581 (repealed)	1581 c. 12; 1581 c. 108	29 November 1581
Anent the dew payment of the kingis majesteis custumes. (Repealed by Statute Law Revision (Scotland) Act 1906 (6 Edw. 7. c. 38))
King's Protection Act 1581 (repealed)	1581 c. 13; 1581 c. 109	29 November 1581
For the suirtie of thame that assegit houssis be the kingis commissioun in his hines minoritie. (Repealed by Statute Law Revision (Scotland) Act 1906 (6 Edw. 7. c. 38))
Killing and Maiming Cattle Act 1581 (repealed)	1581 c. 14; 1581 c. 110	29 November 1581
Aganis the schamefull oppressioun of slaying and hoching of oxin and horses. (Repealed by Statute Law Revision (Scotland) Act 1906 (6 Edw. 7. c. 38))
Salmon Act 1581 (repealed)	1581 c. 15; 1581 c. 111	29 November 1581
For executioun of the actis maid anent casting doune and halding doun of cruvis and yairis and punischment of the transgressouris thairof slauchter of reid fische and of the fry of all fische. (Repealed by Statute Law Revision (Scotland) Act 1906 (6 Edw. 7. c. 38))
Thieves Act 1581 (repealed)	1581 c. 16; 1581 c. 112	29 November 1581
Additioun to the actis maid aganis notorius theiffis and soirnaris of clannis. (Repealed by Statute Law Revision (Scotland) Act 1906 (6 Edw. 7. c. 38))
Hospitals Act 1581 (repealed)	1581 c. 17 —	29 November 1581
Commissioun for reformatioun of the hospitallis masondewis almoushoussis and beid houssis and reducing thame to thair first institutioun. (Repealed by Statute Law Revision (Scotland) Act 1906 (6 Edw. 7. c. 38))
Sumptuary Act 1581 (repealed)	1581 c. 18; 1581 c. 113	29 November 1581
Aganis the excesse of coistlie cleithing and transporting of woll quhairby the pure may be the better haldin to werk. (Repealed by Statute Law Revision (Scotland) Act 1906 (6 Edw. 7. c. 38))
Sumptuary (No. 2) Act 1581 (repealed)	1581 c. 19; 1581 c. 114	29 November 1581
Aganis superfluus banquetting and the inordinat use of confectouris and droggis. (Repealed by Statute Law Revision (Scotland) Act 1906 (6 Edw. 7. c. 38))
Jurisdiction of Rome Act 1581 (repealed)	1581 c. 20; 1581 c. 115	29 November 1581
Ratificatioun of the act of parliament concerning the decisioun of appellationis maid be the court of rome. (Repealed by Statute Law Revision (Scotland) Act 1906 (6 Edw. 7. c. 38))
Residence of Land Owners Act 1581 (repealed)	1581 c. 21; 1581 c. 116	29 November 1581
Aganis the abuse of sum landit gentilmen and utheris forbeiring to keip hous at thair awin duelling places. (Repealed by Statute Law Revision (Scotland) Act 1906 (6 Edw. 7. c. 38))
Lawburrows Act 1581 still in force	1581 c. 22; 1581 c. 117	29 November 1581
Additioun to the act of Lawborrowis. Addition to the act of Lawburrows.
Breach of Arrestment Act 1581 still in force	1581 c. 23; 1581 c. 118	29 November 1581
Anent deforcementis breking of arreistmentis and alienationis maid in defraud of creditouris.
Inhibitions Act 1581 (repealed)	1581 c. 24; 1581 c. 119	29 November 1581
Anent registratioun of Inhibitionis and Interdictionis. (Repealed by Statute Law Revision (Scotland) Act 1906 (6 Edw. 7. c. 38))
Prescription Act 1581 (repealed)	1581 c. 25 —	29 November 1581
Ratificatioun of the act anent prescriptioun in causis of spuilyeis and ejectionis. (Repealed by Statute Law Revision (Scotland) Act 1906 (6 Edw. 7. c. 38))
Convention of Burghs Act 1581 (repealed)	1581 c. 26; 1581 c. 119	29 November 1581
Anent the conuentioun of burrowis. Regarding the convention of burghs. (Repealed by Debtors (Scotland) Act 1987 (c. 18))
Shipping Act 1581 (repealed)	1581 c. 27; 1581 c. 120	29 November 1581
Anent the cuming of schippis to the burrowis of the west cuntrie. (Repealed by Statute Law Revision (Scotland) Act 1906 (6 Edw. 7. c. 38))
Regulation of Prices Act 1581 (repealed)	1581 c. 28; 1581 c. 121	29 November 1581
Anent the setting of ordoure and price on all stuf. (Repealed by Statute Law Revision (Scotland) Act 1906 (6 Edw. 7. c. 38))
Horses Act 1581 (repealed)	1581 c. 29; 1581 c. 122	29 November 1581
Anent the halding of horsis at hard meit be cowparis. (Repealed by Statute Law Revision (Scotland) Act 1906 (6 Edw. 7. c. 38))
Firearms Act 1581 (repealed)	1581 c. 30; 1581 c. 123	29 November 1581
For executioun of the actis maid aganis schuting with gunnis at wylde beistis and fowlis. (Repealed by Statute Law Revision (Scotland) Act 1906 (6 Edw. 7. c. 38))
Export of Cattle Act 1581 (repealed)	1581 c. 31; 1581 c. 124	29 November 1581
Aganis the transporting of nolt and scheip furth of the realme. (Repealed by Statute Law Revision (Scotland) Act 1906 (6 Edw. 7. c. 38))
Captains of Castles Act 1581 (repealed)	1581 c. 32; 1581 c. 125	29 November 1581
Aganis the unlawfull taking of profite be capitanis and keiparis of oure soverane lordis castellis. (Repealed by Statute Law Revision (Scotland) Act 1906 (6 Edw. 7. c. 38))
Wine Act 1581 (repealed)	1581 c. 33; 1581 c. 126	29 November 1581
For punishment of the fraudfull mixioun of the wynis be the tavernaris and sellaris thairof and utheris thair abuses. (Repealed by Statute Law Revision (Scotland) Act 1906 (6 Edw. 7. c. 38))
Heirs of Forfeited Persons Act 1581 (repealed)	1581 c. 34 —	29 November 1581
Additioun to the act of disheresing of the posteritie of the personis foirfaltit for the murthuris of the king oure soverane lordis father and his twa regentis. (Repealed by Statute Law Revision (Scotland) Act 1906 (6 Edw. 7. c. 38))
Not public and general	1581 c. 35 —	29 November 1581
Approbatioun of the erle of Arranis proceidingis for tryell of the murther of the king oure soverane lordis dearest father.
Crown Lands Act 1581 Not public and general	1581 c. 36 —	29 November 1581
Annexatioun of landis to the croun.
Proclamation of Acts Act 1581 (repealed)	1581 c. 37; 1581 c. 128	29 November 1581
Anent the proclamatioun of the actis of parliament. (Repealed by Statute Law Revision (Scotland) Act 1906 (6 Edw. 7. c. 38))
King's Council Act 1581 (repealed)	1581 c. 38 —	29 November 1581
Anent the establishing of the kingis majesteis counsale. (Repealed by Statute Law Revision (Scotland) Act 1906 (6 Edw. 7. c. 38))
Suitors to King Act 1581 (repealed)	1581 c. 39 —	29 November 1581
Ordoure how the kingis majestie salbe releifeit of importune and untymous suitters. (Repealed by Statute Law Revision (Scotland) Act 1906 (6 Edw. 7. c. 38))
Factories Act 1581 (repealed)	1581 c. 40 —	29 November 1581
Anent the dischargeing off factoreis. (Repealed by Statute Law Revision (Scotland) Act 1906 (6 Edw. 7. c. 38))
Not public and general	1581 c. 41 —	29 November 1581
Act in favour of Robert Erskein apparent of lytill sauche and James Colvile of eister wymis.
Ward Holdings Act 1581 (repealed)	1581 c. 42 —	29 November 1581
Anent the taxatioun of wardlandis. (Repealed by Statute Law Revision (Scotland) Act 1906 (6 Edw. 7. c. 38))
Not public and general	1581 c. 43 —	29 November 1581
Declaratioun in favour off Alexander Hwme of Manderstoun.
Not public and general	1581 c. 44 —	29 November 1581
Act anent the debetable caussis betuix the Gordonis and Forbessis.
Not public and general	1581 c. 45 —	29 November 1581
Act of compromit betuix the Gordonis and Forbessis.
Not public and general	1581 c. 46 —	29 November 1581
Anent the changeing of the surename of Williame Maxwell apperand of Lammingtoun in the surename of Baillie.
Not public and general	1581 c. 47 —	29 November 1581
Act of Remitting betwix the burrowis of Dundie and Perth of the decisioun of the contraversie for prioritie betwix thame to the remanent burrowis.
Not public and general	1581 c. 48 —	29 November 1581
Act in favoure of Johnne Carnagye of that Ilk.
Not public and general	1581 c. 49 —	29 November 1581
Act in favour of maistir Johnne Dowglas.
Not public and general	1581 c. 50 —	29 November 1581
The erectioun of the landis of doun in ane lordschip.
Not public and general	1581 c. 51 —	29 November 1581
Act in favoure of the burgh of aberdene.
Not public and general	1581 c. 52 —	29 November 1581
Act for changeing of the assumptioun of the thrid of the abbay of Scone.
Not public and general	1581 c. 53 —	29 November 1581
Act for changeing of a pairt of the assumptioun of the thrid of the abbacie of Aberbrothok.
Not public and general	1581 c. 54 —	29 November 1581
Protestatioun maid be syndrie nobilmen and utheris of the estatis.
Not public and general	1581 c. 55 —	29 November 1581
Protestatioun maid be James stewart Erle of Arrane.
Not public and general	1581 c. 56 —	29 November 1581
Protestatioun maid be maister James Foulis for francis Erle Boithwell.
Not public and general	1581 c. 57 —	29 November 1581
Ratificatioun and confirmatioun of the faire of dalkeith.
Not public and general	1581 c. 58 —	29 November 1581
Ratificatioun of the burgh in baronie of the toun of Myretoun.
Not public and general	1581 c. 59 —	29 November 1581
Ratificatioun of the burgh in baronie of the towne of Portsoy with certane uther privilegeis.
Not public and general	1581 c. 60 —	29 November 1581
Ratificatioun of the seinyie fair of sanct androis.
Not public and general	1581 c. 61 —	29 November 1581
Ratificatioun of the fair of streveling.
Not public and general	1581 c. 62 —	29 November 1581
Ratificatioun of the fair of uchtirardour.
Not public and general	1581 c. 63 —	29 November 1581
Ratificatioun of the fair at the brig end of luntrethin.
Not public and general	1581 c. 65 —	29 November 1581
Ratificatioun of the prevelege of silk making to Robert Diksone.
Lords of Session Act 1581 (repealed)	1581 c. 65 —	29 November 1581
Ratificatioun grantit to the Lordis of sessoun of thair commissioun for ordour taking with the commissaris. (Repealed by Statute Law Revision (Scotland) Act 1906 (6 Edw. 7. c. 38))
Not public and general	1581 c. 66 —	29 November 1581
Ratificatioun grantit to maister william baillie Lord provand.
Not public and general	1581 c. 67 —	29 November 1581
Ratificatioun grantit to capitane thomas crawfurd of Jordanhill.
Revocation Act 1581 (repealed)	1581 c. 68 —	29 November 1581
The revocationis of the propertie casualitie with exceptionis furth of the same and first revocatioun of the propertie. (Repealed by Statute Law Revision (Scotland) Act 1906 (6 Edw. 7. c. 38))
Revocation (No. 2) Act 1581 (repealed)	1581 c. 69 —	29 November 1581
The revocatioun of the casualiteis. (Repealed by Statute Law Revision (Scotland) Act 1906 (6 Edw. 7. c. 38))
Revocation (No. 3) Act 1581 (repealed)	1581 c. 70 —	29 November 1581
The revocatioun of the collectorie. (Repealed by Statute Law Revision (Scotland) Act 1906 (6 Edw. 7. c. 38))
Not public and general	1581 c. 71 —	29 November 1581
Ratificatioun of the dispositioun of the Reversionis of the erldome of Lennox.
Not public and general	1581 c. 72 —	29 November 1581
Ratificatioun grantit to James erll of Arrane off his Infeftment.
Not public and general	1581 c. 73 —	29 November 1581
Ratificatioun grantit to frances erll Bothuell.
Not public and general	1581 c. 74 —	29 November 1581
Ratificatioun grantit to Johnne erll of Mortoun.
Not public and general	1581 c. 75 —	29 November 1581
Ane act in favour of maister James Haliburtoun provest of dundie.
Not public and general	1581 c. 76 —	29 November 1581
Ratificatioun grantit to William erll of Gowrie.
Not public and general	1581 c. 77 —	29 November 1581
Ratificatioun grantit to dame Margarett Leslie Countes of Angus of the conjunctfie landis during hir lyftyme.
Not public and general	1581 c. 78 —	29 November 1581
Ratificatioun of ane act of secrete counsell maid to the Lady morhame.
Not public and general	1581 c. 79 —	29 November 1581
Ratificatioun to the lord Lyndsay.
Not public and general	1581 c. 80 —	29 November 1581
Ratificatioun grantit to William Ker of Cesfurd.
Not public and general	1581 c. 81 —	29 November 1581
Ratificatioun grantit to Sir James home of Coldinknowis knycht.
Not public and general	1581 c. 82 —	29 November 1581
Ratificatioun grantit to Alexander home of manderstoun.
Not public and general	1581 c. 83 —	29 November 1581
Ratificatioun grantit to Alexander home of manderstoun and Alexander Commendatar of Coldinghame of the landis of symprene and toftis.
Not public and general	1581 c. 84 —	29 November 1581
Ratificatioun grantit to Andro Ker of fawdounsyde.
Not public and general	1581 c. 85 —	29 November 1581
Ratificatioun grantit to harie Stewart of ane ferd pairt of the landis of Gogar.
Not public and general	1581 c. 86 —	29 November 1581
Ratificatioun grantit to harie stewart of the baronie of Braidwod and utheris.
Not public and general	1581 c. 87 —	29 November 1581
Ratificatioun grantit to william stewart writar of the landis of thurlstoun.
Not public and general	1581 c. 88 —	29 November 1581
Ratificatioun grantit to Andro monro of dawachcarty.
Not public and general	1581 c. 89 —	29 November 1581
Ratificatioun grantit to Jonet King.
Not public and general	1581 c. 90 —	29 November 1581
Ratificatioun to William Mosman.
Not public and general	1581 c. 91 —	29 November 1581
Ratificatioun to Patrik Creichtoun of Lugtoun.
Not public and general	1581 c. 92 —	29 November 1581
The confirmatioun of the infeftment of fewferme of the Ill abbay and mansioun of sanctcolmis Insh.
Not public and general	1581 c. 93 —	29 November 1581
Ratificatioun grantit to maister mark kar of the abbay of newbottill.
Not public and general	1581 c. 94 —	29 November 1581
Ratificatioun grantit to harie stewart sonne to James stewart of downe of the abbay of sanctcolmis Inshe.
Not public and general	1581 c. 95 —	29 November 1581
Ratificatioun grantit to the Priour of Pluscardin of the Priorie thairof.
Not public and general	1581 c. 96 —	29 November 1581
Ratificatioun grantit to Alexander Priour of Coldinghame of the Priorie thairof.
Not public and general	1581 c. 97 —	29 November 1581
Ratificatioun grantit to Sanctleonardis college in Sanctandros.
Not public and general	1581 c. 98 —	29 November 1581
Benefite of pacificatioun grantit to umquhill William Kircaldie of grange knicht.
Not public and general	1581 c. 99 —	29 November 1581
Benefite of pacificatioun grantit to the airis of umquhile mr James kircaldy.
Not public and general	1581 c. 100 —	29 November 1581
Benefite of pacificatioun grantit to the lard of farnihirst.
Not public and general	1581 c. 101 —	29 November 1581
Ratificatioun of the benefite of pacificatioun grantit to Alexander lord Home.
Not public and general	1581 c. 102 —	29 November 1581
Ratificatioun of the benefite of pacificatioun grantit to the lord fleming.
Not public and general	1581 c. 103 —	29 November 1581
The benefite of pacificatioun grantit to Johne flemyng of Boghall.
Not public and general	1581 c. 104 —	29 November 1581
The benefite of pacificatioun grantit to Johne mosman burges of Edinburgh.
Not public and general	1581 c. 105 —	29 November 1581
The benefite of pacificatioun grantit to James cokkie sone lawfull to umquhile James cokkie goldsmith burges of Edinburgh.
Not public and general	1581 c. 106 —	29 November 1581
The benefite of pacificatioun grantit to William Newtoun of that Ilk.
Not public and general	1581 c. 107 —	29 November 1581
The benefite of pacificatioun grantit to Issobell and Alisoun dalyellis.
Not public and general	1581 c. 108 —	29 November 1581
The benefite of pacificatioun grantit to Johne ffoirman Rothisay herauld.
Not public and general	1581 c. 109 —	29 November 1581
The benefite of pacificatioun grantit to Cuthbert Ramsay.
Not public and general	1581 c. 110 —	29 November 1581
The benefite of pacificatioun grantit to Williame melvill burges of Edinburgh.
Not public and general	1581 c. 111 —	29 November 1581
The benefite of pacificatioun grantit to maister Johne crawmond.
Not public and general	1581 c. 112 —	29 November 1581
The benefite of pacificatioun grantit to Patrik Thomesoun.
Not public and general	1581 c. 113 —	29 November 1581
The benefite of the pacificatioun grantit to Adame Mcculloch sumtyme merchemond herauld.

=== Sources ===
- Alexander, William (1841). "Acta Parliamentorum Regis Jacobi Sexti". An Abridgement of the Acts of the Parliaments of Scotland. Edinburgh: Adam and Charles Black. pp. A24 – A26 – via Google Books.
- Alexander, William (1841). "Acta Parliamentorum Regis Jacobi Sexti". An Abridgement of the Acts of the Parliaments of Scotland. Edinburgh: Adam and Charles Black. pp. A24 – A26 – via Google Books.
- Chronological Table of the Statutes. London: Her Majesty's Stationery Office. 1972. pp. 1337–1338 – via Google Books.
- "Acts of the Old Scottish Parliament: 1581". legislation.gov.uk. The National Archives.
- "Index of Statutes: James VI (1567-1625)". Records of the Parliaments of Scotland to 1707. University of St Andrews.

== See also ==
- List of legislation in the United Kingdom
- Records of the Parliaments of Scotland
